= Phil Méheux =

English cinematographer

- Born: Philip Méheux; 17 September 1941 (age 85); Sidcup, Kent, England
- Education: Chislehurst and Sidcup Grammar School
- Occupation: Cinematographer
- Years active: 1966–2021
- Website: philmeheux.com

Philip Méheux (born 17 September 1941) is an English cinematographer known for his collaborations with directors John Mackenzie and Martin Campbell.

He is a member of the British Academy of Film and Television Arts, and served as president of the British Society of Cinematographers between 2002 and 2006.

== Filmography ==
=== Film ===
Year	Title	Director	Notes
1976	Exposé	James Kenelm Clarke	Uncredited
1977	Black Joy	Anthony Simmons	
1978	Let's Get Laid	James Kenelm Clarke	
1979	The Music Machine	Ian Sharp	
1979	Scum	Alan Clarke	
1980	The Long Good Friday	John Mackenzie	
1981	The Final Conflict	Graham Baker	With Robert Paynter
1982	Who Dares Wins	Ian Sharp	
1982	Experience Preferred... But Not Essential	Peter Duffell	
1983	The Honorary Consul	John Mackenzie	
1985	Morons from Outer Space	Mike Hodges	
1987	The Fourth Protocol	John Mackenzie	
1988	Criminal Law	Martin Campbell	
1989	Renegades	Jack Sholder	
1991	Highlander II: The Quickening	Russell Mulcahy	
1991	Defenseless	Martin Campbell	
1992	Ruby	John Mackenzie	
1993	The Trial	David Jones	
1993	Ghost in the Machine	Rachel Talalay	
1994	No Escape	Martin Campbell	
1995	GoldenEye	Martin Campbell	
1997	The Saint	Phillip Noyce	
1998	The Mask of Zorro	Martin Campbell	
1999	Entrapment	Jon Amiel	
1999	Bicentennial Man	Chris Columbus	
2003	Beyond Borders	Martin Campbell	
2004	Around the World in 80 Days	Frank Coraci	
2005	The Legend of Zorro	Martin Campbell	
2006	Casino Royale	Martin Campbell	
2008	Beverly Hills Chihuahua	Raja Gosnell	
2010	Edge of Darkness	Martin Campbell	
2011	The Smurfs	Raja Gosnell	
2012	Here Comes the Boom	Frank Coraci	
2013	The Smurfs 2	Raja Gosnell	
2015	The SpongeBob Movie: Sponge Out of Water	Paul Tibbitt	Live-action unit
2021	Three Pints and a Rabbi	Richard Perry	

=== Television ===
Year	Title	Director	Notes
1968-1972	Omnibus	Tony Palmer	Episodes "All My Loving" and "Born Black Born British"
1977	Play for Today	John Mackenzie; Mike Newell; John Goldschmidt	Episodes "Just Another Saturday", "Brassneck", "Double Dare", "The Elephants' Graveyard" and "Spend, Spend, Spend"
1978	Out	Jim Goddard	All 6 episodes
1978	The Professionals	Anthony Simmons; Peter Medak; David Wickes; Martin Campbell	5 episodes; Also directed 2 episodes

TV movies

Year	Title	Director
1975	The Whip Hand	Les Blair
1977	The Emperor of Atlantis	John Goldschmidt
1982	The Disappearance of Harry	Joseph Despins
1983	Those Glory Glory Days	Philip Saville
1985	Max Headroom: 20 Minutes into the Future	Rocky Morton; Annabel Jankel
1986	Act of Vengeance	John Mackenzie
1986	Apology	Robert Bierman

Miniseries

Year	Title	Director
1977	The Age of Uncertainty	Mick Jackson
1984	Lace	William Hale

== Awards and nominations ==
Year	Award	Category	Title	Result
1978	BAFTA Awards	Best Film Cameraman	Play for Today (For episode "Spend, Spend, Spend")	Nominated
2006	BAFTA Awards	Best Cinematography	Casino Royale	Nominated
2006	British Society of Cinematographers	Best Cinematography	Casino Royale	Won
2022	British Society of Cinematographers	Lifetime Achievement Award		Won
2015	American Society of Cinematographers	International Award		Won
