= Anthony Steel (actor) =

British actor (1920–2001)

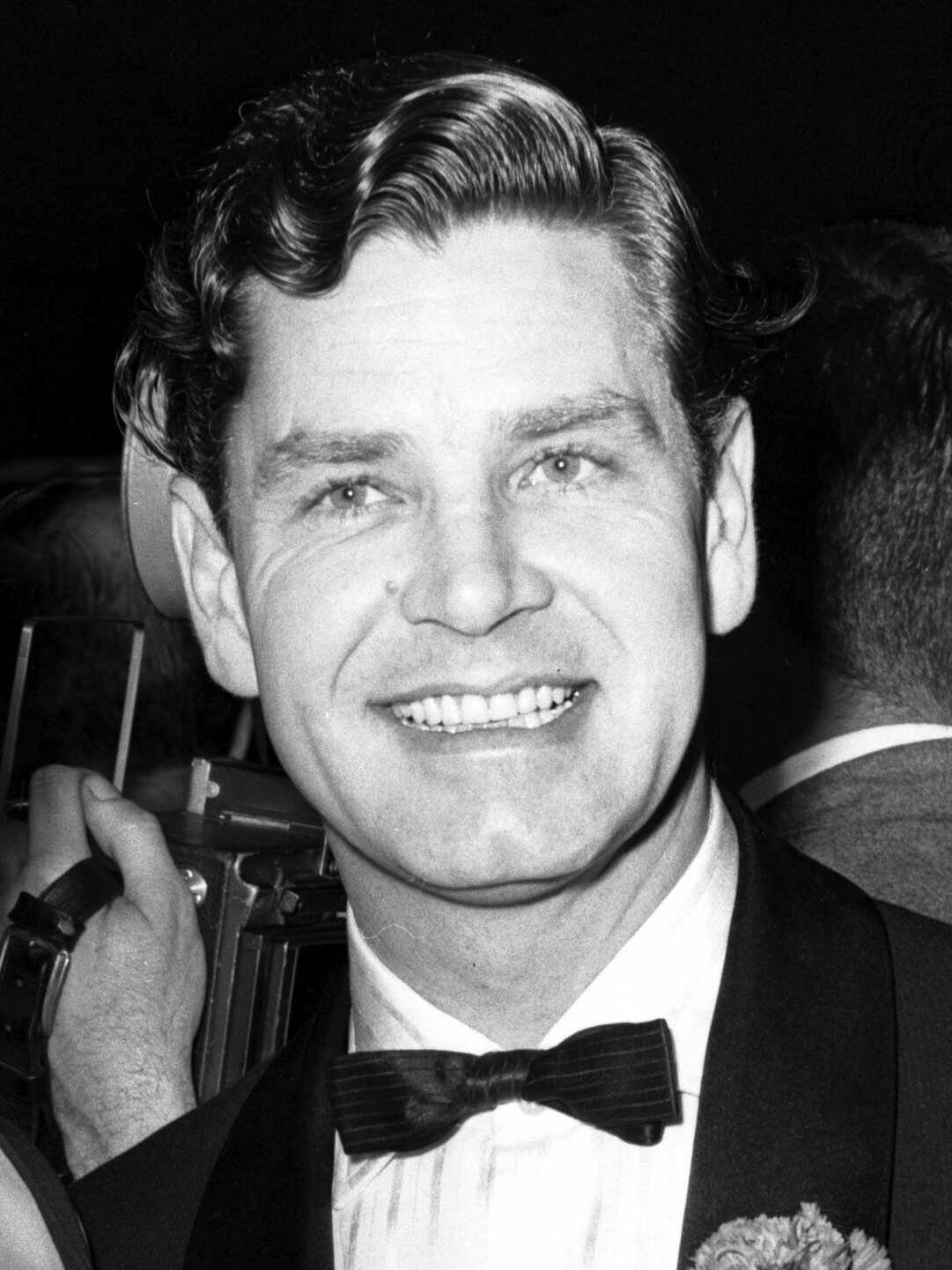
- Steel at the 30th Academy Awards in 1958
- Born: Anthony Maitland Steel; 21 May 1920; Chelsea, London, England
- Died: 21 March 2001 (aged 80); Northwood, Middlesex, England
- Occupations: Actor; singer
- Years active: 1948–1998
- Spouses: Juanita Forbes (m. 1949; div. 1954) Anita Ekberg (m. 1956; div. 1959) Johanna Melcher (m. 1964)
- Partner: Ann Hanson
- Children: 2

Anthony Maitland Steel (21 May 1920 – 21 March 2001) was an English actor and singer who appeared in British war films of the 1950s such as The Wooden Horse (1950) and Where No Vultures Fly (1951). He was also known for his tumultuous marriage to Anita Ekberg.

He was described as "a glorious throwback to the Golden Age of Empire... the perfect imperial actor, born out of his time, blue-eyed, square-jawed, clean-cut." As another writer put it, "whenever a chunky dependable hero was required to portray grace under pressure in wartime or the concerns of a game warden in a remote corner of the empire, Steel was sure to be called upon." Another said "Never as popular as Stewart Granger or as versatile as Kenneth More, he enjoyed a brief period of fashionability embodying the kind of idealised, true-blue Englishman who probably rowed for his university, played cricket on the village green and exuded calm under pressure as he bravely fought for king and country."

== Early life and career ==
Anthony Steel was born in Chelsea, the son of an Indian army officer, Edward (1897–1965), who later became an actor and Kathleen Yate Lee (d. 1962).

Steel spent most of his early childhood in India (in Lahore) and was educated until he was 14 at Alexander House Prep School, Broadstairs, Kent. He continued his studies at home with a tutor before attending Trinity College, Cambridge.

=== War service ===
Steel had only completed a year at Cambridge when the Second World War broke out. He enlisted in the Grenadier Guards aged 19 and was evacuated from Dunkirk in May 1940. He received a commission and served in the Middle East where he was badly injured on patrol. He trained as a parachutist and made nine operational jumps. He finished the war with the rank of major.

=== Acting ===
On demobilisation Steel decided to become an actor. For a time he worked with a pick and shovel at Clapham Junction for £6 a week. According to a profile in Filmink "Nature blessed him with height, handsomeness, a full head of hair and an excellent speaking voice; he didn't have much natural talent, but those first four things are often more important when it comes to finding acting work."

He began to get some parts on stage, including appearing opposite Margaret Lockwood in Roses for Her Pillow, a stage version of the film Once Upon a Dream which was being given a special performance by Rank contract artists. He was dating a niece of J. Arthur Rank who introduced Steel to her uncle at a party. Rank subsequently signed the actor to a long-term contract with his company.

=== Early Rank years ===
Steel was trained at Rank's "charm school" and given a slow buildup with small parts in several films, starting with Saraband for Dead Lovers (1948). He also appeared in A Piece of Cake (1948), Portrait from Life (1948), Once Upon a Dream (1949), Marry Me! (1949), Quartet (1948), The Blue Lamp (1949), Trottie True (1949), Poet's Pub (1949), Don't Ever Leave Me (1949), Helter Skelter (1949), Christopher Columbus (1949), and The Chiltern Hundreds (1949). He also acted on stage in repertory at Aldershot and Worthington.

He tested unsuccessfully for a part in Walt Disney's Treasure Island (1950).

== Stardom ==
Steel's roles up until then had been essentially bit parts. His first big break was being cast as one of three British POWs who escape from a camp in The Wooden Horse (1950). This film, based on a true story, was the third most popular film at the British box office in 1950 and established Steel as a leading man. Director Jack Lee said that the actor "was fine to work with, just a physical type, a young chap who could do certain things, though he didn't have much acting to do in this." He was paid £15 a week. "[Co star] Leo Genn was getting thousands," Steel recalled. "It made me pretty mad."

Steel was cast as the romantic male lead in The Mudlark (1950), a Hollywood film starring Irene Dunne being shot in London. He had a small part in the comedy Laughter in Paradise (1951) then supported another Hollywood name, Bette Davis in the thriller, Another Man's Poison (1951). He did a play Turn to Page Two (1950).

Steel's next big break was being cast as a game park warden inspired by Mervyn Cowie in Where No Vultures Fly (1951), shot mostly on location in Kenya. This was the most popular British movie of the year and the Royal Command Performance Film for 1951, confirming Steel's status as a genuine box office draw. In 1952 British exhibitors voted him the fourth most popular British star and he was seen as the successor to Stewart Granger. One profile argued that:

Audiences appreciated his lack of "brood" and neurosis; he seemed fresh-faced and decent: the ideal uncomplicated boyfriend/junior lieutenant/game warden. In addition, at a time when many British leading men seemed "indoorsy" (i.e. wimps), Steel was a physically active type. He didn't come across too sleazy on screen, either... he could seem romantically interested in women but not lecherous about it.

He co-starred with Jack Warner in a thriller directed by Lewis Gilbert, Emergency Call (1952). Rank tried Steel in a comedy, Something Money Can't Buy (1952), with Patricia Roc but the public response was not enthusiastic. They put him back in uniform in The Planter's Wife (1952), set during the Malayan Emergency. It was the sixth most popular film of 1952 in Britain, although Steel's part was a relatively minor one in support of Jack Hawkins and Claudette Colbert.

He again supported two stars in a military story when he appeared in Malta Story (1953), with Hawkins and Alec Guinness. It was the fourth most popular film of the year in Britain in 1953. Hollywood called, in the form of Warner Bros. who cast him in support of Errol Flynn in the British-shot swashbuckler The Master of Ballantrae (1953); it was a minor success.

Also moderately popular was Albert R.N. (1952), reuniting Steel with Jack Warner and Lewis Gilbert in another World War II POW film. He starred in a sequel to Where No Vultures Fly, West of Zanzibar (1954). It was not as successful as the first movie although Steel had an unexpected hit record when he recorded a version of the title track.

The Sea Shall Not Have Them (1954) was another war film from Gilbert, co-starring Dirk Bogarde and Michael Redgrave. Out of the Clouds (1955) was an ensemble movie set at London airport, not as well received as Steel's war movies.

In 1954 Steel and Dirk Bogarde were the highest paid actors with the Rank Organisation with a reported salary of £15,000 a film. Still, he was not happy with his roles. "In America, they build their male stars by starring them opposite exciting women," he said. "What do they give me? Elephants, crocodiles and giraffes." However, in Passage Home he was cast opposite Diane Cilento. "At last I can prove that I have blood in my veins and can make love to a woman," said Steel. "You know how the public identify themselves with the stars. Well, they think that an actor who gets the girl all the time – especially if she is very glamorous – must really have something." Michael Craig appeared in Passage Home and recalled Steel "treated everyone with casual arrogance" on the set. Cilento wrote in her memoirs:

Anthony was not an actor in any sense of the word. He was an ex-army hunk who used to roll his sleeves up to his armpits so that his bulging biceps would be even more prominent. He was cleft-chinned and had a loose lock of dark hair curling over his forehead. When he spoke, it was more clenched lower jaw than stiff upper lip and it made everything he said sound intimate and urgent.

Steel was given the starring part in Storm Over the Nile (1956), an almost shot-for-shot remake of The Four Feathers (1939) but a solid hit in Britain. The Black Tent (1956) was another war movie, set in Northern Africa during World War II. Checkpoint (1956) was a change of pace, a racing-car thriller partly shot in Italy for director Ralph Thomas.

== Anita Ekberg ==
In 1956 Steel married Swedish actress Anita Ekberg and together they moved to Hollywood, with mixed results. He broke his contract with the Rank Organisation – for whom he was meant to star in The Secret Place (1957) – in what has been described as "a disastrous over-estimation of his own ability." Steel received bad publicity for fighting with Ekberg and attacking paparazzi, and was arrested twice for drunk driving.

During his time in Hollywood Steel appeared in one film, the little-seen Valerie (1957). It was announced he would be in a film to be made in Spain, Tetuan, but this did not come to fruition.

Steel returned to Britain briefly but was unable to regain his earlier popularity. He had the lead in a courtroom drama, A Question of Adultery (1958), and supported Stewart Granger in a Hollywood-financed adventure tale shot partly in India, Harry Black (1958). Steel claimed he turned down parts so as to be near Ekberg.

He appeared in a film directed by Michael Powell in Spain, Honeymoon (1959), but it was one of Powell's least known works; the part had been written for Paul Scofield but Powell ended up casting Steel whom he called "the archetypal British shit."

John Davis, head of the Rank Organisation was known to be furious about Steel having left the company earlier after the support they had given him, and this was thought to have harmed his chances at reviving his career. Steel was also hurt by the fact that the sort of war films in which he had made his name were going out of fashion.

After guest starring on an episode of Adventures in Paradise in Los Angeles, which was directed by Robert Aldrich, he went to Sweden to make 48 Hours to Live (1959).

In 1960 Steel went missing for a week from a luxury hotel in Germany, leading to a two-nation search. He later turned up in Rome, claiming he had just gone there to discuss another film.

== Italy ==
In February 1961 Steel announced his marriage to Ekberg was over and that he wanted to move back from Rome to England. However he wound up basing himself in Rome for most of the 1960s.

In Italy he appeared – like many fading stars – in a sword-and-sandal film, Revenge of the Barbarians (1960) – and a swashbuckler, Tiger of the Seven Seas (1962). In the latter a critic said he "seemed very under the weather".

He was also in the comedy Vacanze alla baia d'argento (1961).

He returned to the UK to appear in an episodes of Crane and Thirty Minute Theatre, and star in some low budget films, like The Switch (1963) and A Matter of Choice (1963). In Germany he appeared in Winnetou: The Red Gentleman (1963; then The Queens (1966) in France, Hell Is Empty (1967) in Czechoslovakia (part financed by Rank), The Long Day of Inspector Blomfield (1968), and Anzio (1968).

Anita Ekberg claimed Steel borrowed £40,000 from her in 1968 but never returned it.

In 1969 he said it "was a big mistake to come" to Rome, adding "But I couldn't face it. You can't leave a country as a big star and go back. I had lost everything, even my shirt." He said he wanted to come back to Britain "before people forget me altogether... I am a British actor and I am a bloody good actor. I just hope people remember me... I still photograph well. I photograph like 40 but I happen to be 50. I have been away too long I don't guarantee they will accept me and I don't guarantee I will accept them... But I want to be judged on my ability. I am a good actor and I now have to convince the new producers."

His roles grew smaller and less prestigious, such as appearing as Sir Stephen in the Just Jaeckin film adaptation of Story of O (1975).

== Later career ==
He debuted on TV as Mr Burton in a 1974 episode of Thriller, (I'm The Girl He Wants To Kill). In 1976 he appeared in Crossroads playing a conman over four weeks. He also guest starred on shows such as Bergerac, Robin of Sherwood and in the hard-hitting police drama The Professionals, the episode titled "The Female Factor," in which he played Sir Charles Milvern, a shadow minister who is snared in a honey trap.

He made two soft core films with Fiona Richmond: Hardcore (1977) and Let's Get Laid (1977). One writer argued "In hindsight, Steel would have been most comfortable cast as a regular character on a long running series where he played a man of authority – a silver fox doctor, for instance, or a chief inspector on a detective show. It didn't happen."

He made stage tours in the 1980s and his last role was in Cinderella, a pantomime at Birmingham's Alexandra Theatre in 1989. He lived for a number of years in a tiny flat in Northolt, west London. His then agent, David Daly, said that:

He was a very private man. He just decided that he would withdraw. He found a place to live and simply went into hiding. In some ways, it was not unlike him; if he decided that things weren't right, he would withdraw into himself and not contact anybody.

In 1995 Sir John Mills tried to rehouse him through the Actors Benevolent Fund but Steel refused. Steel told a journalist in 1997:

This is a very difficult time for me. You can see that by where I'm living. I know a lot of people are trying to find out where I am, but to be honest that's how I want it. I want to be left alone. I don't want to see any of my old friends from my old life. I've been quite ill lately and it's too much for me to go back to it all now. Of course I have regrets, but there is nothing anyone can do to change the past. I just want to get on with it.

Daly arranged for him to move into Denville Hall, a London retirement home for actors. Not long before he died he had a guest role in the television series The Broker's Man.

== Singer ==
In 1954, Steel teamed up with the British vocal ensemble The Radio Revellers to record "West of Zanzibar". Released on the Polygon Records label, it peaked at No. 11 in the UK Singles Chart.

== Personal life ==
Steel was married three times, firstly to Juanita Forbes from 1949 until 1954, secondly to Anita Ekberg from 1956 until 1959 and finally to Johanna Melcher from 1964 until his death.

Steel also had an affair with actress Patricia Roc in 1952 while they were co-starring in Something Money Can't Buy, resulting in a son. Both Steel and Roc were married at the time, he to Juanita Forbes and she to André Thomas but the latter was unable to have children, so Thomas agreed to bring up the child as his own. Steel, then 34, was engaged to his secretary, Anne Hanson, age 20, in 1954. They had a daughter together. His engagement and subsequent marriage to Ekberg was widely publicised at the time. Ekberg later claimed he hit her:

When he wasn't drunk he was charming and cultured, intelligent, a sense of humour. Too bad he got on that road. He would start arguments with anybody after one drink too much and then he would get violent.

== Death ==
Anthony Steel died from lung cancer in Northwood, Greater London in 2001, aged 80.

== Selected filmography ==
- Saraband for Dead Lovers (1948) - (uncredited)
- A Piece of Cake (1948) - Plainclothes Policeman (uncredited)
- Portrait from Life (1949) - Bridegroom
- Once Upon a Dream (1949)
- Marry Me! (1949) - Jack Harris
- Christopher Columbus (1949) - Messenger (uncredited)
- Poet's Pub (1949) - Compton (uncredited)
- Don't Ever Leave Me (1949) - Harris
- Helter Skelter (1949) - (uncredited)
- Trottie True (1949) - The Bellaires' footman
- The Chiltern Hundreds (1949) - Adjutant
- The Blue Lamp (1950) - Police Constable (uncredited)
- The Wooden Horse (1950) - John
- The Mudlark (1950) - Lieutenant Charles McHatten
- Laughter in Paradise (1951) - Roger Godfrey
- Where No Vultures Fly (1951) - Bob Payton
- Another Man's Poison (1951) - Larry Stevens
- Emergency Call (1952) - Dr. Carter
- Something Money Can't Buy (1952) - Captain Harry Wilding
- The Planter's Wife (1952) - Hugh Dobson
- Malta Story (1953) - Wing Cmdr Bartlett
- The Master of Ballantrae (1953) - Henry Durie
- Albert R.N. (1953) - Geoff
- West of Zanzibar (1954) - Bob Payton
- The Sea Shall Not Have Them (1954) - Flying Officer Treherne
- Out of the Clouds (1955) - Gus Randall
- Passage Home (1955) - First Mate Vosper
- Storm Over the Nile (1955) - Harry Faversham
- The Black Tent (1956) - Capt. David Holland
- Checkpoint (1956) - Bill Fraser
- Valerie (1957) - Reverend Blake
- A Question of Adultery (1958) - Mark Loring
- Harry Black (1958) - Desmond Tanner
- Luna de Miel (1959) - Kit Kelly
- Revenge of the Barbarians (1960) - Olympius, Consul of Rome
- Tiger of the Seven Seas (1962) - William Scott
- Crane (1963, TV Series, episode "My Deadly Friend") - Gil
- The Switch (1963) - Bill Craddock
- A Matter of Choice (1963) - John Crighton
- Last of the Renegades (1964) - Bud Forrester
- Two Girls from the Red Star (1966) – Michael Astor
- Sex Quartet (1966) - The Professor (segment "Fata Marta")
- Hell Is Empty (1967) - Major Morton
- The Long Day of Inspector Blomfield (1968) - Arthur Baker
- Anzio (1968) - Gen. Marsh
- Rabbit in the Pit (1969) - Maurice Pouliard
- Hotel Royal (1969, TV film) - Sir Robert Gunningham
- 11 Uhr 20 (1970, TV miniseries) - Carlsson
- Massacre in Rome (1973) - Maj. Domizlaf
- Story of O (1975) - Sir Stephen
- Hardcore (1977) - Robert
- Twilight of Love (1977) - Richard Butler
- Let's Get Laid (1978) - Moncrieff Dovecraft
- The Perfect Crime (1978) - Supt. Jeff Hawks
- The World Is Full of Married Men (1979) - Conrad Lee
- The Dick Francis Thriller: The Racing Game (1979, TV Series) - Count Guiccoli
- Tales of the Unexpected (1980, TV Series, three eps) - 'Timber' / The Stranger / Galloping Foxley
- The Mirror Crack'd (1981) - Sir Derek Ridgeley ('Murder at Midnight')
- The Monster Club (1981) - Lintom Busotsky - Film Producer
- Artemis 81 (1981, TV Movie) - Tristram Guise
- Jemima Shore Investigates (1983, TV Series, one ep) - Henry Hastings
- Andy Robson (1983, TV Series) - Herbert Neville
- Bergerac (1983, TV Series, one ep) - Harker Le Fevre
- The Glory Boys (1984, TV Series) - Director General
- Robin of Sherwood (1984, TV Series) - Earl Godwin

=== Unmade films ===
- Vendetta (1952) based on novel of the same name by Marie Corelli
- The Judas Kiss (1956) - with Anita Ekberg

=== Box office ranking ===
At the height of his career, British exhibitors voted Steel among the most popular local stars in the country.

- 1952 – 4th most popular British star
- 1953 – 10th most popular British star
- 1954 – 7th most popular British star
- 1956 – 6th most popular British star

== Selected theatre credits ==
- Roses for Her Pillow [see 'Acting' section above]
- Turn to Page Two by Michael Clayton Hutton - Embassy Theatre, London 1950
- Dear Liar by Jerome Kilty - English Theatre, Vienna 1963-64
- Conduct Unbecoming by Barry England - UK tour 1982
- The Edge of Fear by Brian Clemens - UK tour 1986
- Cinderella - Birmingham, 1989
