= Let's Get Laid =

1978 British film by James Kenelm Clarke

- Directed by: James Kenelm Clarke
- Written by: Michael Robson; Sam Cree (play)
- Produced by: Brian Smedley-Aston
- Starring: Robin Askwith; Fiona Richmond; Anthony Steel; Linda Hayden
- Cinematography: Phil Méheux
- Music by: James Kenelm Clarke
- Distributed by: Target International
- Release date: May 1978
- Running time: 90 minutes
- Country: United Kingdom
- Language: English

Let's Get Laid, also known as Love Trap, is a 1978 British comedy film directed by James Kenelm Clarke and starring Robin Askwith, Fiona Richmond and Anthony Steel. It was written by Michael Robson and Sam Cree, based on the latter's 1974 play of the same title. A man returns to London after being demobbed at the end of the Second World War, only to find himself suspected of a murder in Wapping.

Steel and Richmond had previously starred together in Hardcore (1977).

== Cast ==
- Fiona Richmond as Maxine Lupercal
- Robin Askwith as Gordon Laid / Jimsy Deveroo
- Anthony Steel as Moncrieff Dovecraft
- Linda Hayden as Gloria
- Roland Curram as Rupert Dorchester
- Graham Stark as Inspector Nugent
- Patrick Holt as The Commissioner
- Tony Haygarth as Sgt. Costello
- John Clive as Piers Horrabin
- James Marcus as Rusper
- Murray Salem as heavy
- Ted Burnett as heavy
- Richard Manuel as Fenton Umfreville
- Charles Pemberton as PC Baxter
- Shaun Curry as Greenleaf
- Fanny Carby as lady in phone booth
- Peter Cartwright as film director
- David Sterne as Sgt. Millicent
- Anna Chen as oriental girl
- Lisa Taylor as Eleanor
- Jayne Lester as young tart
- Donna Scarf as A.T.S. girl
- Claire Russell as Marti
- Tony Hughes as Goddard Ronaldshay
- Zuleika Robson as Thelma
- Shelagh Dey as Helen
- Ron Eagleton as Wilbur
- Frank Ellis as mortician
- Elise Relnah as old lady
- Daryl Fahey as coutourier
- Clive Moss as Corporal
- Val Mitchell as stage chorus
- Jane Winchester as stage chorus
- Adrian Le Peltier as stage chorus
- Mike Charles as stage chorus

== Critical reception ==
The Monthly Film Bulletin wrote: "The audience always knows what to expect of Maxine Lupercal's films, explains one of the unit, alluding to the fact that (in a feeble running gag) the same script is used for all of them. It is unlikely, however, given its title and co-stars, that patrons of Let's Get Laid! will be expecting a lame comedy-thriller shakily set in the late Forties (although its material more properly belongs to the preceding decade). The film remains fatally undecided whether to go for parody or pastiche, and duly fails as either, with only the on-stage finale (seemingly cribbed from Danny Kaye's Knock on Wood) sufficiently well-timed to make any impact. Moreover, Robin Askwith looks no more at ease in his George Formby guise than does Fiona Richmond as a latter-day Gainsborough Girl. As a concession to the raincoat trade, however, she is allowed to display her more customary charms in some arbitrarily inserted dream interludes, one of which dubiously attires her, in the brief pause before the stripping starts, in a Nazi uniform."

The Radio Times Guide to Films gave the film 2/5 stars, writing: "Also known as Love Trap, this was Robin Askwith's farewell to the world of soft-core comedy. When you've been reduced to playing characters called Gordon Laid, it's easy to see how the novelty might have worn thin. The director is James Kenelm Clarke, whose involvement with the genre came after directing a BBC documentary on pornography."
