= Without Motive =

- Title card (Series 1)
- Genre: Crime drama
- Created by: Tim Vaughan; Russell Lewis
- Starring: Ross Kemp; Kenneth Cranham; Jamie Foreman; Hazel Ellerby; Ian Bartholomew; Sean Murray; Lou Gish; John Telfer; Jane Hazlegrove
- Composers: John E. Keane (Series 1); Dameion Barry (Series 2)
- Country of origin: United Kingdom
- Original language: English
- No. of series: 2
- No. of episodes: 12

Production
- Executive producers: Tim Vaughan; Michelle Buck
- Production locations: Bristol, England, UK
- Running time: 60 mins. (with advertisements)
- Production companies: Alibi Productions; United Productions; HTV (2000); Meridian Broadcasting (2001)

Original release
- Network: ITV
- Release: 2 October 2000 – 1 November 2001

Without Motive is a British crime drama series broadcast on ITV, starring Ross Kemp as the protagonist, Detective Constable Jack Mowbray, a born and bred Bristol detective whose world is turned upside down when he is assigned to a major murder enquiry involving a serial killer, who is randomly attacking young women, apparently without motive. Two series of the programme were produced. The first was produced by HTV, and the second by Meridian Broadcasting. Both series aired consecutively between 2 October 2000 and 1 November 2001. Both series were issued on DVD on 11 October 2011, exclusively in the United States by Acorn Media.

== Plot ==
Detective Constable Jack Mowbray (Ross Kemp) investigates when the brutal murder of a young woman in Bristol sets off a chain of events, which, unbeknown to him, threaten to tear his family apart and change the course of his life forever. When the Bristol murder is linked to a series of recent killings, known as the 'M4 Murders', the investigating team grows to more than a dozen detectives, and just as many petty jealousies and full-blown rivalries. Mowbray's boss, Detective Chief Superintendent Derek Henderson (Kenneth Cranham), keeps the pressure on as it becomes clear that the latest killing will not be the last. With little clue or pattern to suggest the identity of the killer, the team are forced to a race against time to find the predator before he strikes again – without apparent motive.

Mowbray's main sidekick is DC Jim Boulter (Jamie Foreman), a no-nonsense detective who is prepared to stop at nothing to get to the truth. He often comes close to crossing the line when interrogating suspects, often forcing Mowbray or his other colleagues to intervene. Other officers on the enquiry include DI Monty Fowler (Sean Murray), a long-time close friend of Derek Henderson, who is drafted in to lead up one side of the enquiry at Henderson's request. The other senior investigating detective, DI Keith Champan (John Telfer) was specially selected by Assistant Chief Commissioner Ronald Stocks (Ian Bartholomew), who has overall control of the investigation. Chapman's team also consists of WPC Margaret Walkinshaw (Jane Hazlegrove), a rookie officer barely out of her probation period, and DCs Mickey Lloyd (David Kennedy) and Phil Leighton (William Bateman). Fowler's team also consists of DC Linda Harris (Lou Gish) and DC Trevor Richard (Howard Saddler). Henderson's main adversary, Detective Chief Superintendent Huw Owen (Robert Blythe), is the initial investigating officer on the case. When Owen comes close to blowing the investigation, Stocks decides to replace him with Henderson. However, Henderson later comes close to being sidelined himself, until the team identify Robert Jackson (Karl Johnson) as the prime suspect for the murders.

Although Jackson is initially arrested by Mowbray, Henderson makes the shock decision to release him without charge. When two further attacks occur, one of which results in a further murder, Jackson is re-arrested and eventually charged. In the beginning of the second series, Jackson is convicted of the murders, but when a subsequent attack takes place, with exactly the same modus operandi, the team suspect a copycat killer - although Fowler and Mowbray suspect that Jackson may not have been their man after all. When a civil case is brought against Mowbray and Henderson for misconduct, Mowbray discovers that vital evidence against Jackson was not discovered during the course of the initial investigation.

== Cast ==
- Ross Kemp as DC Jack Mowbray
- Kenneth Cranham as DCS Derek Henderson
- Jamie Foreman as DC Jim Boulter
- Lou Gish as DC/DS Linda Harris
- Sean Murray as DI Monty Fowler
- Howard Saddler as DC Trevor Richard
- Karl Johnson as Robert Jackson
- Hazel Ellerby as Sally Mowbray
- Claire Huckle as Paula Mowbray
- Buster Reece as Stuart Mowbray
- Mika Simmons as Rosie
- Jane Hazlegrove as WPC/DC Margaret Walkinshaw (1.1 – 2.4)
- John Telfer as DI Keith Chapman (1.1 – 2.2)
- David Kennedy as DC Mickey Lloyd (1.1 – 1.6)
- William Bateman as DC Phil Leighton (1.1 – 1.6)
- Simon Bowen as DC Collins (1.1 – 1.6)
- Robert Blythe as DCS Huw Owen (1.1 – 1.6, 2.5)
- Ian Bartholomew as ACC Ronnie Stocks (1.1 – 2.4)
- William Armstrong as ACC David Ashdown (2.4 – 2.6)
- Tony Melody as Robert Jackson Snr. (2.2 – 2.6)

== Episodes ==
=== Series overview ===
Series	Episodes	Originally released	
Series	Episodes	First released	Last released
1	6	2 October 2000	5 November 2000
2	6	27 September 2001	1 November 2001

=== Series 1 (2000) ===
No. overall	No. in series	Title	Directed by	Written by	Original release date	Viewers (millions)
1	1	"A Family Man"	Tristram Powell	Russell Lewis	2 October 2000	9.10m
A young woman is found murdered near the city's red-light district. Her husband quickly becomes the chief suspect, but DC Mowbray has his doubts. Meanwhile, the detectives learn about the brutal murder of three prostitutes in nearby south Wales.
2	2	"Memories of Laura"	Tristram Powell	Russell Lewis	9 October 2000	8.43m
A joint investigation begins into all four murders, but questions arise over the competency of the Welsh senior detective. Another murder back in Bristol breaks all the patterns of the previous killings – and comes uncomfortably close to Mowbray's family.
3	3	"Out of Context"	Tristram Powell	Russell Lewis	15 October 2000	8.56m
Tensions deepen between Mowbray and his wife, as the police launch their investigation into the latest killing. The murdered woman, a student, worked part-time at a pizza restaurant, where the detectives establish a link with the first victim in Wales.
4	4	"Fit the Picture"	James Hawes	Russell Lewis	22 October 2000	7.34m
The police pursue a number of leads, but Mowbray strongly suspects Robert Jackson, a delivery driver with a previous record of violence against women. Mowbray's boss disagrees, however, and the detective must decide whether to charge Jackson.
5	5	"Decision Time"	James Hawes	Russell Lewis	29 October 2000	8.39m
Another victim turns up, and morale among the investigating officers hits rock bottom. The stresses of the job force Mowbray to consult a therapist, but not before his actions drive Sally away from him. Adding to the pressure, the killer strikes again.
6	6	"A Rattled Man"	James Hawes	Russell Lewis	5 November 2000	8.15m
Mowbray takes himself off the case, goes on leave, and tries to patch things up with Sally and the kids. While he's gone, the police make an arrest. DCS Henderson believes he has his man but needs a confession to be sure.

=== Series 2 (2001) ===
No. overall	No. in series	Title	Directed by	Written by	Original release date	Viewers (millions)
7	1	"Judgement Day"	Ferdinand Fairfax	Tim Vaughan & Russell Lewis	27 September 2001	5.62m
Robert Jackson is convicted of murdering five women. A day later, another woman is killed in a similarly brutal manner. The detectives fall under pressure when questions arise about how Jackson had managed to slip through the police's net.
8	2	"Declaring War"	Ferdinand Fairfax	Tim Vaughan & Russell Lewis	4 October 2001	5.72m
The team investigates whether the latest murder was a revenge killing, a challenge to the police, or a copycat. Meanwhile, Mowbray and Henderson face their own court trial, and the detective has to decide whom he can trust.
9	3	"At the Edge"	Ferdinand Fairfax	Rob Heyland	11 October 2001	Under 4.57m
As Mowbray and Henderson head for trial, it appears that someone has been providing the prosecution with inside information. A senior police officer advises Mowbray to place truth over loyalty in the courtroom. Outside the courtroom, the killing continues.
10	4	"Seeing Ghosts"	Delyth Thomas	Rob Heyland	18 October 2001	5.51m
The investigation into the most recent murder brings about unforeseen consequences in high places. Cracks also begin to emerge in the case against Robert Jackson when Mowbray learns that crucial evidence had been suppressed.
11	5	"Hindsight"	Delyth Thomas	Michael Russell	25 October 2001	Under 5.18m
Jackson is released from prison and seeks to cash in on his celebrity status, while the detectives have to sift through all the old evidence again. Finally, they get a breakthrough – a link between the latest killing and one of the Welsh murders.
12	6	"The Final Pursuit"	Delyth Thomas	Michael Russell	1 November 2001	Under 5.16m
Henderson realises the killer has to be someone they all know. As Mowbray closes in on a suspect, he alerts his family to the danger. In the end, it's a race to see who can get to their target first.
