= Linda Hayden (actress) =

English actress (born 1953)

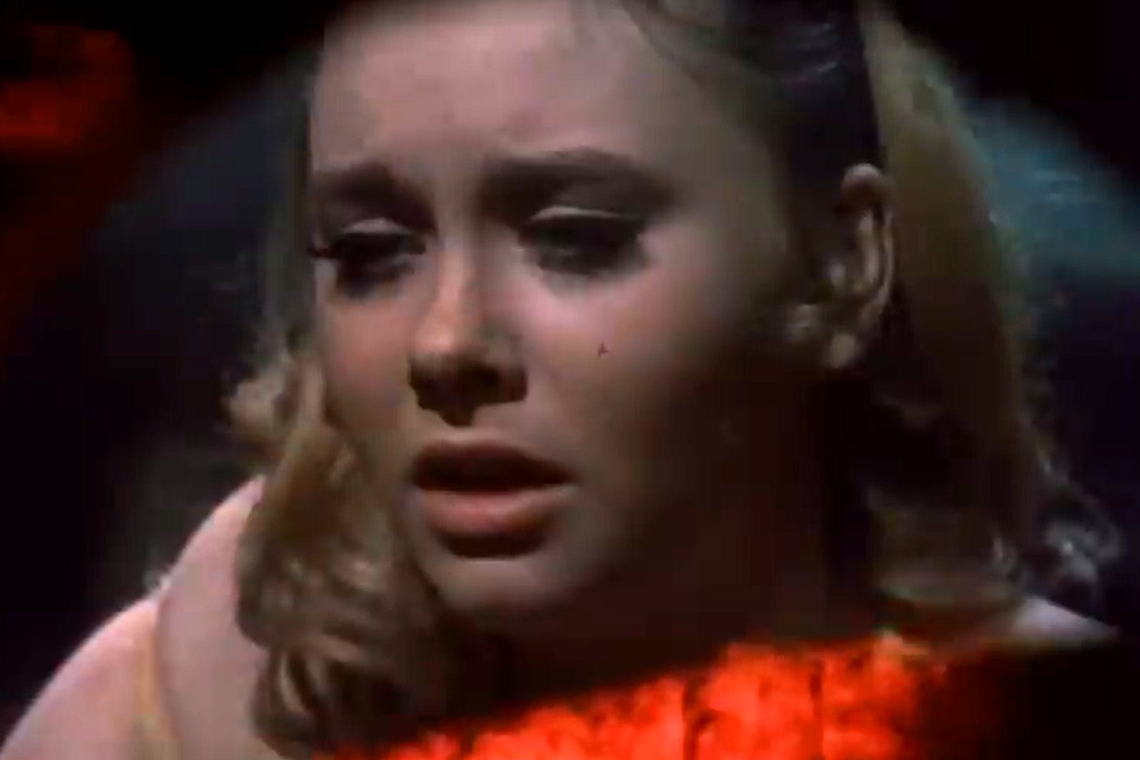
- Hayden in Taste the Blood of Dracula (1970)
- Born: Linda M. Higginson; 19 January 1953 (age 73); Stanmore, Middlesex, England
- Occupation: Actress
- Spouse: Paul Elliot (m. 1987; died 2026)

Linda Hayden (born Linda Higginson, 19 January 1953) is an English film and television actress. She is best known for her roles in 1970s British horror films and sex comedies.

== Career ==
Hayden was born in Stanmore, Middlesex. She trained at the Aida Foster stage school before making her film debut at the age of 15 in the film Baby Love (1969), playing a schoolgirl who seduces her adoptive family. She next appeared in two horror films; playing Alice Hargood in Hammer's Taste the Blood of Dracula, (1970), followed by a memorable performance as the demonically possessed Angel Blake in The Blood on Satan's Claw (1971), made by Tigon. In 1972, she played a pregnant teenage hitchhiker in Something to Hide.

Hayden appeared opposite Robin Askwith, her then-boyfriend, in the British sex comedies Confessions of a Window Cleaner (1974), Confessions from a Holiday Camp (1977) and, with Fiona Richmond, in Let's Get Laid (1978); she and Askwith were also in the cult film Queen Kong (1976), but this was never released theatrically in Britain due to a legal dispute). Hayden also shared the stage with Askwith, in Richard Harris and Leslie Darbon's farce Who Goes Bare. Hayden and Richmond had previously appeared together in the thriller Exposé (1976), which was known as Trauma in the US and House on Straw Hill in Australia; the film was banned in the UK as a "video nasty".

Following a brief role in The Boys from Brazil (1978), Hayden worked mainly in stage and television work. In 1980 she appeared in the ITV series The Professionals as 'Gerda' in the episode 'Black Out' and as 'Annie,' Terry McCann's girlfriend in the Christmas special Minder on the Orient Express, 1985. She also took a role in the thriller Underground at Toronto's Royal Alexandra Theatre and London's Prince of Wales Theatre in 1983, as well as a 1997 episode of The Bill.

Now semi-retired, she featured as Mrs Brown in Martin Kemp's 2010 remake of Exposé, with Jane March playing Linda (Hayden's role in the 1976 original).

== Writing ==
In March 2023, Hayden penned an introduction to the LGBT+ horror novel, Satan's Lamp by William Jackson. Referring to her first film role as Luci in Baby Love, she writes, 'I was transfixed to see myself on an eighty-foot-high poster in Times Square... making me look like an evil creature and sending all the wrong messages... But in an odd twist of fate, this billboard turned out to be an augur of my future with the horror genre.'

== Personal life ==
She is the sister of the actress Jane Hayden (b. 1957), who played a number of roles on films and TV in the 1970s.

Hayden was in a relationship with her fellow actor and frequent co-star Robin Askwith in the 1970s. She married Paul Elliot in 1987.

== Filmography ==
=== Film ===
Year	Title	Role	Notes
1969	Baby Love	Luci	
1970	Taste the Blood of Dracula	Alice Hargood	Hammer production
1971	The Blood on Satan's Claw	Angel Blake	Tigon production
1972	Something to Hide	Lorelei	
1973	Night Watch	Girl in Car	Embassy Pictures
1974	Vampira	Helga	
1974	Madhouse	Elizabeth Peters	Amicus Productions
1974	Barcelona Kill	Linda	La redada (original title)
1974	Confessions of a Window Cleaner	Elizabeth Radlett	Columbia Pictures
1976	Exposé	Linda Hindstatt	House on Straw Hill (alternative title)
1976	Queen Kong	The Singing Nun	
1977	Confessions from a Holiday Camp	Brigitte	Columbia Pictures
1978	Let's Get Laid	Gloria	
1978	The Boys from Brazil	Nancy	20th Century Fox
2010	Stalker	Ms. Brown	
2012	Run for Your Wife		Cameo

=== Television ===
Year	Title	Role	Notes
1968	The Charlie Drake Show		2 episodes
1971	Now Look Here	Sally	4 episodes
1972	Crown Court	Linda Davies	Episode: "Traffic Warden's Daughter - Part 1"
1973	Some Mothers Do 'Ave 'Em	Linda	Episode: "Getting a Job"
1973	Marked Personal	Gillian Gibson	2 episodes
1975	Village Hall	Helga	Episode: "The Rough and the Smooth"
1975	My Brother's Keeper	Jennie	Episode: "Pig in the Middle"
1976	Heydays Hotel	Irmgarde	TV film
1977	The Galton & Simpson Playhouse	Henry's Secretary	Episode: "Swap You One of These for Another of Those"
1978-1979	Robin's Nest	Jan/Millie Winters	2 episodes
1980	Mackenzie	Krista	Episode: "Sole Agent"
1980	The Professionals	Gerda Helm	Episode: "Black Out"
1981	Dick Turpin	Sal	Episode: "Dick Turpin's Greatest Adventure - Part 4"
1981	Shillingbury Tales	Mandy Smith	4 episodes
1982	Let There Be Love	Annabelle	Episode: "Dad's the Word"
1983	Cuffy	Mandy	2 episodes
1983	Just Good Friends	Sonia	Episode: "After All This Time"
1983	Hart to Hart	Ute	Episode: "Passing Chance"
1984	Hammer House of Mystery and Suspense	Ellen Jarvis	Episode 8 "Black Carrion"
1985	Minder	Annie	Episode: "Minder on the Orient Express"
1986	The Kenny Everett Television Show		2 episodes
1988	Mr. H is Late	Sunbather	Television short
1989	The Return of Sam McCloud	Nancy Cratchett	TV film
1991	The Upper Hand	Diana Wilkinson	Season 2, episode 9 "A Friend in Need"
1992	Shelley	Mrs. Archer	1 episode
1997	The Bill	Wendy Pierce	Episode: "Performance Anxiety"
