= Michael Feast =

English actor (born 1946)

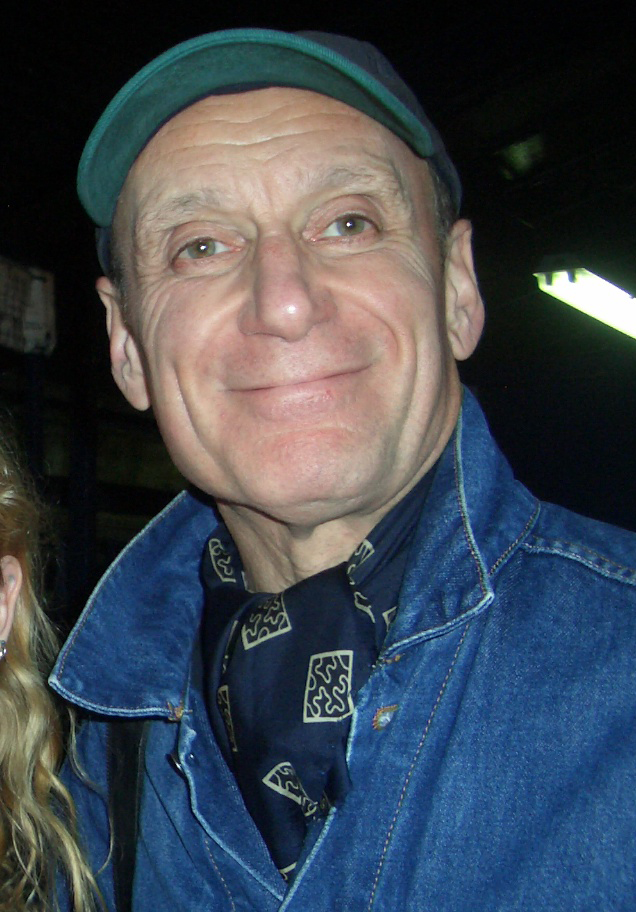
- Feast in 2011
- Born: Michael Feast; 25 November 1946 (age 78); Brighton, Sussex, England
- Occupation: Actor
- Years active: 1968–present

Michael Feast (born 25 November 1946) is an English actor of stage and screen.

== Early life ==
Feast was born in Brighton, and trained at the Central School of Speech and Drama.

== Career ==
He performed in the original 1968 London production of Hair. He worked several times with John Gielgud, whom he later played in Nicolas de Jongh's biographical play Plague Over England. Feast had a significant role in the acclaimed TV series State of Play. He also played Aeron Greyjoy in the sixth season of the HBO series Game of Thrones.

His film credits include roles in I Start Counting (1970), Private Road (1971), Brother Sun, Sister Moon (1972), Got It Made (1974), Hardcore (1977), The Music Machine (1979), McVicar (1980), The Draughtsman's Contract (1982), The Fool (1990), Velvet Goldmine (1998), Prometheus (1998), The Tribe (1998), Sleepy Hollow (1999), Long Time Dead (2002), Boudica (2003), Penelope (2006), The Deaths of Ian Stone (2007) and There Be Dragons (2011).

== Selected theatre performances ==
- Hair (Original London Cast Recording) 1968
- Nicholas Beckett in What the Butler Saw by Joe Orton. Directed by Braham Murray at the Royal Exchange, Manchester. (1977)
- Henry in The Skin of Our Teeth by Thornton Wilder. Directed by Richard Negri and James Maxwell at the Royal Exchange, Manchester. (1977)
- Telegin in Uncle Vanya by Anton Chekhov. Directed by Michael Elliott at the Royal Exchange, Manchester. (1977)
- Roland Maule in Present Laughter by Noël Coward. Directed by James Maxwell at the Royal Exchange, Manchester. (1977)
- Billy Bigelow in Carousel by Rodgers and Hammerstein. Directed by Steven Pimlott at the Royal Exchange, Manchester. (1984)
- Subtle in The Alchemist by Ben Jonson. Directed by Greg Hersov at the Royal Exchange, Manchester. (1987)

== Filmography ==
=== Film ===
Start Counting (1970)
Private Road (1971)
Brother Sun, Sister Moon (1972)
Got It Made (1974)
Hardcore (1977)
The Music Machine (1979)
McVicar (1980)
The Draughtsman's Contract (1982)
The Fool (1990)
Velvet Goldmine (1998)
Prometheus (1998)
The Tribe (1998)
Sleepy Hollow (1999)
Long Time Dead (2002)
Boudica (2003)
Penelope (2006)
The Deaths of Ian Stone (2007)
There Be Dragons (2011)

== Selected television performances ==
=== Television ===
Year	Title	Role	Notes
1976	The Expert	Kenny Keely	Series 4 Episode 7: "Suspicious Death"
1984	Travelling Man	Naylor	Episode 2: "The Collector"
1989	Miss Marple	Edward Hillingdon	Episode 10: "A Caribbean Mystery"
1991	The Diamond Brothers: South by South East	Detective Chief Inspector Snape	Episodes: all
1995	Bugs	O'Neill	Series 1 Episode 6: "Stealth"
1997	Touching Evil	Commander Enwright	Episodes: all
1998	Midsomer Murders	Ian Craigie	Episode: "Death in Disguise"
2003	State of Play	Andrew Wilson	Episodes 1-5
2004	Murphy's Law	Detective Chief Superintendent Rees	6 episodes
2007	Silent Witness	Martin Huston	Episode: "Hippocratic Oath"
2007	The Inspector Lynley Mysteries	Asst. Commissioner Evans	Episode: "Know Thine Enemy"
2016	Game of Thrones	Aeron "Damphair" Greyjoy	2 episodes
2019	Vera	Leonard Sidden	Episode: "The Seagull"
