= The Music Machine (film) =

- Directed by: Ian Sharp
- Written by: James Kenelm Clarke additional dialogue Alan Drury; Roger Headey; Terry Wilton
- Produced by: Brian Smedley-Aston executive James Kenelm Clarke
- Starring: Gerry Sundquist; Patti Boulaye
- Cinematography: Phil Méheux
- Distributed by: Target International
- Release date: 1979
- Country: United Kingdom
- Language: English
- Budget: $500,000 or £125,000

The Music Machine is a 1979 British musical drama film directed by Ian Sharp and starring Gerry Sundquist, Patti Boulaye and David Easter. It was written by James Kenelm Clarke.

It was called the first all-British disco film.

== Plot summary ==
In a north London music hall, local kids dance at the disco, where the DJ is Laurie. A contest is held by an impresario to find two dancers to star in a film. Gerry is a club regular who lives with his mum and dad (a projectionist). Gerry wants to impress another dancer and winds up dancing with Claire. He is double-crossed by manager Nick Dryden.

== Cast ==
- Gerry Sundquist as Gerry Pearson
- Patti Boulaye as Claire
- David Easter as Howard
- Mandy Perryment
- Hector Woodville
- Michael Feast as Nick Dryden
- Ferdy Mayne as Basil Silverman
- Clarke Peters as Laurie
- Richard LeParmentier as Jay Reltano
- Johnnie Wade as Mr. Pearson
- Gary Shail as Aldo
- Brenda Fricker as Mrs. Pearson
- Thomas Baptiste as Claire's father
- John Gorman as newsagent
- Christopher Pichaeli as dancer

== Production ==
Director Ian Sharp was working at the BBC as a documentary filmmaker. They gave him a three-month sabbatical to make the movie, which Sharp says ignited his interest in working in drama.

The film's star Gerry Sundquist was best known for his work in the National Theatre and was cast even though he could not dance. "It all happened so quickly," he later said. "I couldn't believe it. I was a bit worried at first - it's not exactly Richard the Third is it?... It's about a boy who is really untogether at the beginning. He's got lots of energy and zitz and he wants to be the greatest in a dance competition. But he's like me – he's got two left feet."

Sunquist did intensive training to be able to dance. The film was shot over three weeks.

== Reception ==
The Guardian said the film "limps a bit" but "does have some life about it. It isn't as atrocious as it could have been... The trouble is the dancing is actually pretty awful."

The Observer criticised the "poor music and the truly terrible dancing" but thought "several things combine to make it [the film] oddly likeable - the unglamorous view of teenage camaraderie, the unforced affection of Gerry's relationship with his parents, and some odd quirky scenes here and there."

Variety wrote: "In relocating the elements of Saturday Night Fever virtually intact to London, but with an added dollop of downbeat British realism, The Music Machine aspires to tell the scene like it is, instead of like it was packaged. Plot, characters and production values, however, stand considerably less scrutiny than those of the original, and the comparison, albeit invited, ends up invidious. With some appeal nonetheless to fans of disco at any cost – however low – the film could cut the odd caper at box-offices close to home, if promoted via its strong soundtrack to the very young-in-mind, and preferably young-in-fact. Prospects beyond these shores, besides possibly in the traditional British Commonwealth markets, look shaky. James Kenelm Clarke's script tilts directly at unseating the Saturday Night Fever myth. It plots an unemployed youth's finally successful attempts to win a dance competition against the local champ, played by David Easter, who not only looks like John Travolta, but dances and dresses like him as well. Raw, likeable talent defeats smooth, arrogant image."
