= Stalker (2010 film) =

2011 British film by Martin Kemp

- Release Poster
- Directed by: Martin Kemp
- Written by: Martin Kemp; Jonathan Sothcott; Phillip Barron; James Kenelm Clarke
- Based on: Exposé; 1976 film by James Kenelm Clarke
- Produced by: Jonathan Sothcott
- Starring: Anna Brecon; Jane March; Jennifer Matter; Danny Young; Billy Murray; Triana Terry Linda Hayden
- Cinematography: James Friend
- Edited by: Jason de Vyea
- Music by: Neil Chaney
- Production companies: Black & Blue Films
- Distributed by: Screen Media Films
- Release dates: October 2010 (Busan); 17 October 2011
- Running time: 77 minutes
- Country: United Kingdom
- Language: English
- Budget: $3,100,000

Stalker, also known as Exposé, is a 2010 psychological horror film directed by Martin Kemp and starring Jane March, Anna Brecon and Jennifer Matter. It is a remake of the 1976 film Exposé, starring Linda Hayden, who makes a cameo appearance in this film.

== Plot ==
Having published a bestseller, writer Paula Martin retreats to her family's gothic country house, Crow's Hall, to focus on writing a new book. Struggling with writer's block and nightmares of her abusive childhood, she employs an assistant named Linda. As Paula's nightmares persist, Linda provides her with comfort and support, even allowing Paula to sleep in her bed. When Paula finds Linda editing her novel one morning, she flies into a rage. Linda reacts by secretly killing Paula's cat.

Unaware of the cat's death and feeling guilt for shouting at Linda, Paula apologises to Linda and admits that she is impressed by Linda's additions to the book. Linda offers to write some more of it and allows Paula to take the day off. Linda then takes control of the book and Paula's life, screaming at her to send the staff home when the noise they make distracts her. Too timid to fight back, Paula meekly obeys Linda and becomes bedridden, with Linda locking her in her room.

When a successful writer named Robert Gainor comes to the house to interview Paula, Linda poses as Paula, and invites Gainor into the kitchen. When Gainor asks Linda if he can record their interview, she flirts with him before slashing his throat. Revealing she was abused by her brother when she was thirteen, she stabs Gainor to death and hides his body in the cellar. The housekeeper, Mrs. Brown, later finds the body and is killed as well.

One night, Paula awakes from a nightmare discovering that she has cut her wrist and the sheets are covered with blood. Soothing her and bandaging her wounds, Linda changes the bedclothes and sends Paula back to bed.

Meanwhile, Paula's psychiatrist Leo Fox and her publicist Sara Phillips discuss Paula over dinner. They are beginning to worry about her seclusion, having not seen her since she went to Crow's Hall. When they get back to Leo's home, he plays a recording of a furious Linda screaming and swearing. When a disturbed Sara asks who it is, Leo says it is the voice of someone stalking Paula since she was a girl.

Later, Paula finds Gainor and Mrs. Brown's bodies in the cellar. She runs past Linda, who is waiting with a knife, and locks herself in her room. Paula calls Leo, leaving a message that she is locked in the house with Linda who has killed two people. Leo drives over to Crow's Hall accompanied by Sara. He reveals that "Linda" is a split personality that Paula created to cope with her brother's abuse. This alternate personality has been "stalking" Paula ever since. When they arrive at Crow's Hall, Leo finds Paula sitting on the floor sobbing. Sara finds laptop with the book's manuscript, which she discovers is extremely good.

Meanwhile, Linda's personality takes over and fatally stabs Leo. Sara attempts to leave the house with the laptop but forgets her car keys and flees into the forest. A chase ends with Linda being impaled on a jagged tree branch and dies.

Sara takes the laptop and claims authorship of the manuscript. The film ends with the book being published with Sara's contented voice stating, "Everything's just perfect".

== Cast ==
- Anna Brecon as Paula Martin
- Jane March as Linda
- Jennifer Matter as Sara Phillips
- Danny Young as Josh
- Billy Murray as Robert Gainor
- Triana Terry as Camille (Sara's assistant)
- Nathan Benham as Sara's date
- Linda Hayden as Ms. Brown

== Reception ==
Jennie Kermode of Eye For Film gave it a positive review, saying "What makes this film work so well is the effectiveness with which it preserves the ambiguity of the situation for most of its running time." Todd Martin of HORRORNEWS.net also received it positively, saying that "the big twist is nothing short of awesome." He tempered that by describing the first thirty minutes of the film as "very boring and slow-moving".

The film received also negative reviews, with DiscDish writing, "The plot is ridiculous, the scenes predictable, the “horror” factor laughable. But then, what else would you expect?"
