= Alastair Reid (director) =

Scottish television director (1939–2011)

- Born: 21 July 1939; Edinburgh, Scotland
- Died: 17 August 2011 (aged 72); Stoke St Gregory, Somerset, England
- Education: Edinburgh College of Art; Bristol Old Vic Theatre School
- Occupations: Film director, writer

Alastair Reid (21 July 1939 – 17 August 2011) was a Scottish television and film director, described by The Guardian on his death as "one of Britain's finest directors of television drama".

== Early life and education ==
Born in Edinburgh, Reid studied at the Edinburgh College of Art and the Bristol Old Vic Theatre School.

== Career ==
In 1964, Reid directed episodes of Emergency-Ward 10 for ATV and worked regularly in television for over thirty years. His work included writing the screenplay of the film Shout at the Devil (1976) and directing the first episode of Inspector Morse in 1987, as well as directing the television series Gangsters (1976—78), the serial Traffik (1989), the television series Selling Hitler (1991), based on the Hitler diaries, the miniseries Tales of the City (1993), and the 1997 television adaptation of Joseph Conrad's novel Nostromo.

== Filmography ==
- Baby Love (1969)
- The Night Digger (1971)
- Something to Hide (1972)
- Shades of Greene (1975)
- Shout at the Devil (1976) (screenplay)
- Gangsters (1976–77)
- Hazell (1979)
- Artemis 81 (1981)
- Inspector Morse: The Dead of Jericho (1987)
- Traffik (1989)
- Selling Hitler (1991)
- Tales of the City (1993)
- Nostromo (1996)
- What Rats Won't Do (1998)
