= Hardcore (1977 film) =

1977 British film by James Kenelm Clarke

- Theatrical release poster
- Directed by: James Kenelm Clarke
- Written by: James Kenelm Clarke; Michael Robson
- Produced by: Brian Smedley-Aston
- Starring: Fiona Richmond; Anthony Steel; Victor Spinetti; Ronald Fraser
- Cinematography: Mike Molloy
- Music by: James Kenelm Clarke
- Release date: March 1977
- Running time: 80 minutes
- Country: United Kingdom
- Language: English

Hardcore (U.S. title: Fiona) is a 1977 British sex comedy film directed by James Kenelm Clarke and starring Fiona Richmond, Anthony Steel, Victor Spinetti, Ronald Fraser and Graham Crowden. It depicts a fictionalised account of the life of Richmond as a 1970s sex symbol. It was the first of two movies Anthony Steel made with Richmond.

== Plot ==
At a beautiful villa in the South of France, Fiona tells him the story of her life, with dramatised episodes to illustrate the stages of her sexual awakening.

== Cast ==
- Fiona Richmond as Fiona
- Anthony Steel as Robert Charlton
- Victor Spinetti as Duncan
- Ronald Fraser as Marty Kenelm-Smedley
- John Clive as Willi
- Roland Curram as Edward
- Graham Crowden as Lord Yardarm
- Graham Stark as Inspector Flaubert
- Percy Herbert as Hubert
- Jeremy Child as Tenniel
- John Hamill as Daniel
- Harry H. Corbett as Art
- Donald Sumpter as Mark
- Arthur Howard as vicar
- Joan Benham as Norma Blackhurst
- Linda Regan as secretary
- Michael Feast as photographer
- Neil Cunningham as schoolmaster (Mr Foster)

== Critical reception ==
The Monthly Film Bulletin wrote: "This is yet another unamusing British sex comedy which misuses all the talents involved. Clarke's Exposé, which employed many of the same team, suggested that he might be able to bring some pace and panache to the sexploitation genre. This ill-conceived and unimaginative piece is particularly distressing therefore – a showcase for the talents of Ms. Richmond which seems to render her incapable of projecting any sort of interesting persona. Presumably the similarities between the real and the fictive Fiona were meant to amplify the titillation – a device which might have worked had the film been at all sure of its tone."

The Radio Times Guide to Films gave the film 1/5 stars, writing: "Fiona Richmond, once Britain's number one sex symbol, plays a woman called Fiona in this bizarre sex comedy. Wrapped around the flimsiest of plots (a woman arrives at a friend's villa to find someone taking away the furniture) is a catalogue of sexual adventures, which must have included every fumbling cliché writer/director James Kenelm Clarke had ever come across."

Screen International wrote: "The film is tongue-in-cheek larky, with Fiona's sexual activities presented as more athletic than sensual although pin-up fanciers will find much to feast their eyes on. Fiona Richmond performs admirably with her body but does not respond with the same spontaneity to the challenge of looking as if she believes in what she is saying. Her impassivity adds spice occasionally, but more often suggests that her body enjoys what her mind does not."

Uncut wrote: "Queen of Seventies soft porn Fiona Richmond stars in a ludicrous yarn where the only narrative impetus seems to be to get Fiona out of her clothes as soon as possible. Actually sub-Carry On, which is saying something, and a waste of Victor Spinetti, Graham Stark and Ronald Frazer all of whom should know much better."
