= Roland Curram =

English actor and author (1932–2025)

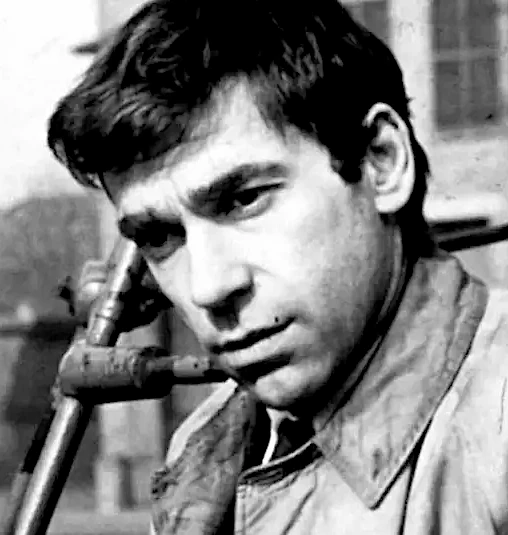
- Curram c. 1970
- Born: 6 June 1932; London, England
- Died: 1 June 2025 (aged 92)
- Occupations: Actor, author
- Years active: 1952–2024
- Spouse: Sheila Gish (m. 1964; div. 1985)
- Partner(s): Clive Castle (2019–2025)
- Children: 2, including Lou Gish

Roland Kingsford Bernard Curram (6 June 1932 – 1 June 2025) was an English actor and author, best known for playing Julie Christie's gay photographer friend in Darling (1965).

== Life and career ==
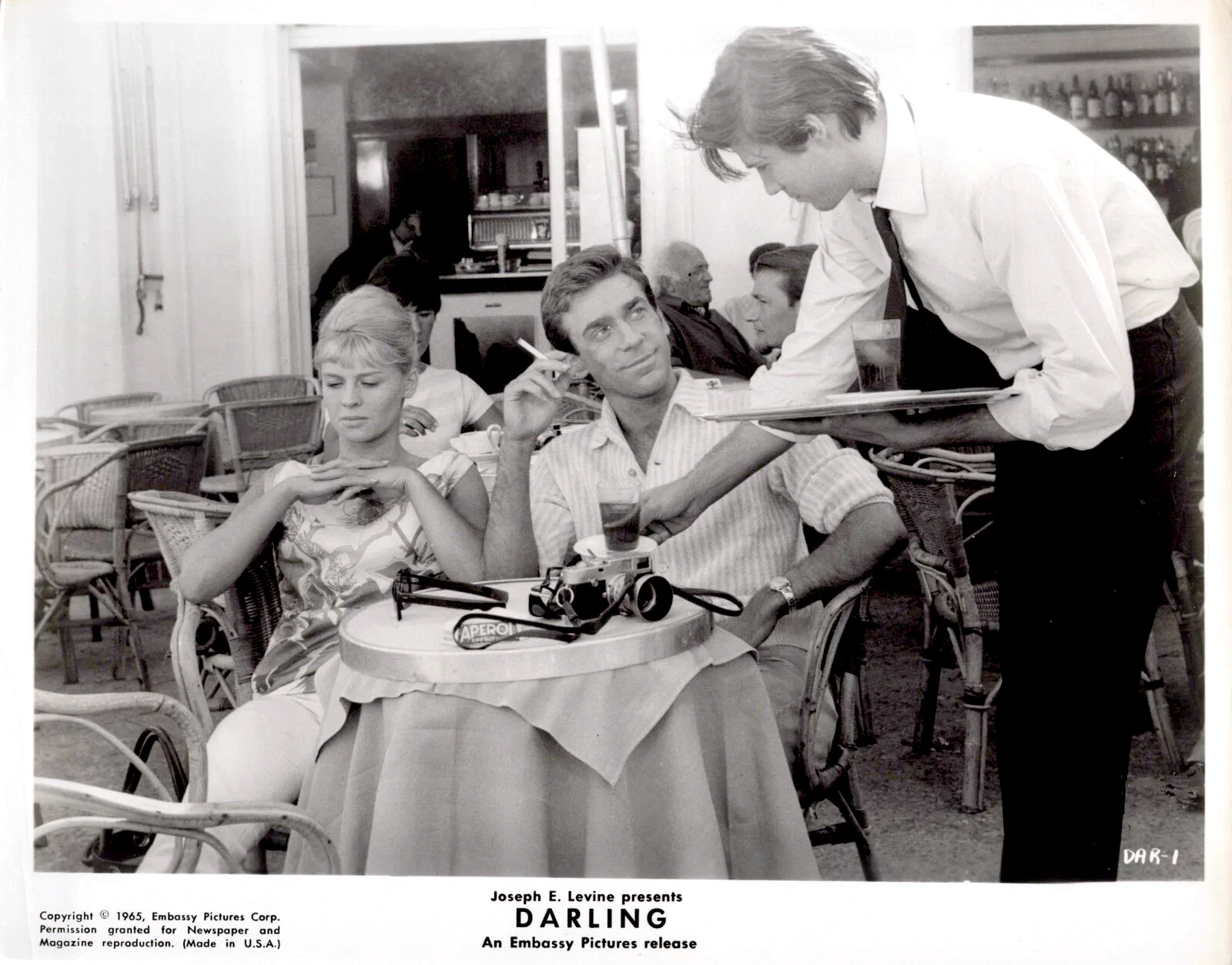
Julie Christie, Curram, and Dante Posani in Darling (1965).

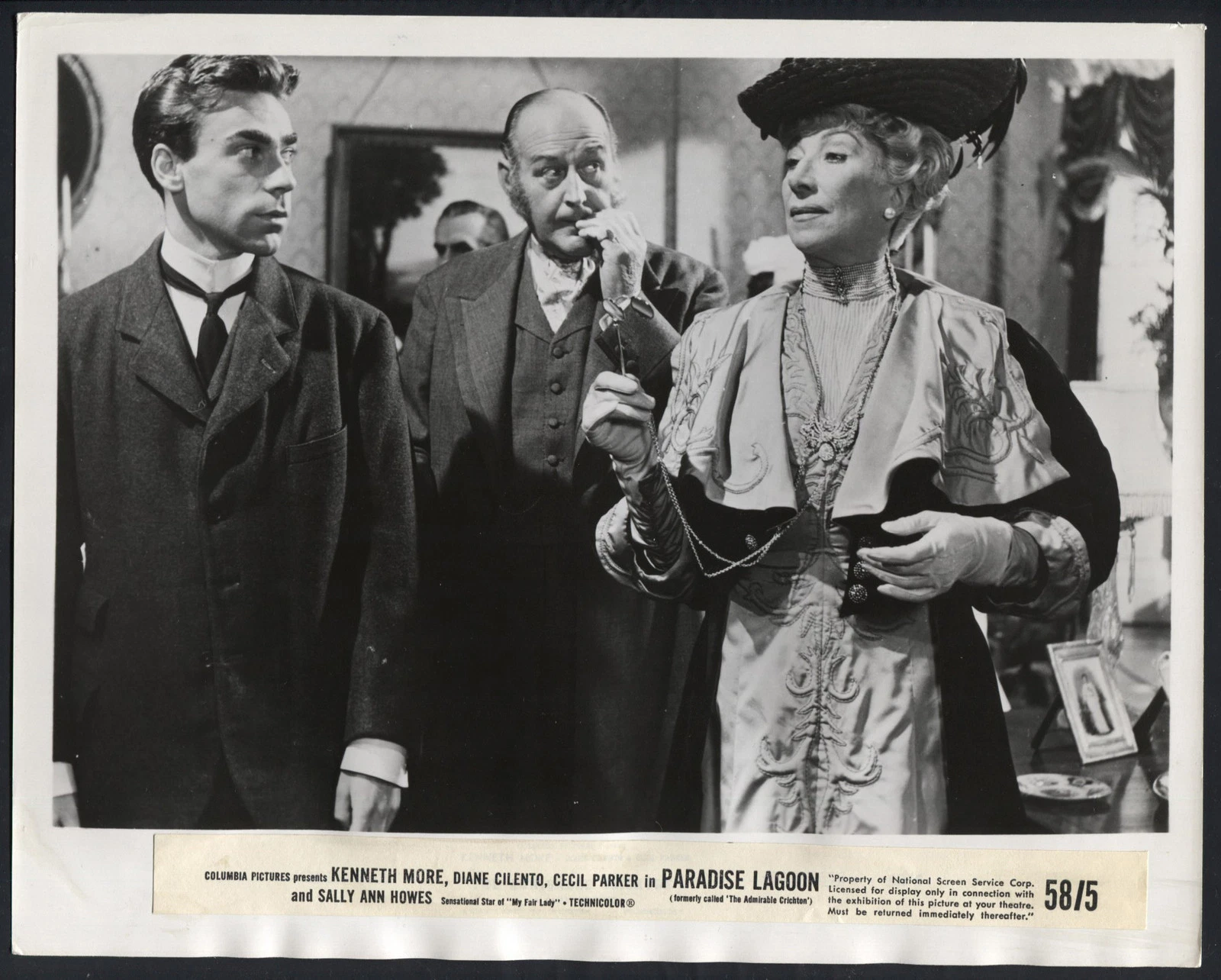
Curram, Cecil Parker, and Martita Hunt in The Admirable Crichton (1957).

Curram was educated at Brighton College and had a long film, television and theatre career. His appearances include Julie Christie's gay photographer friend and travelling companion in three-time Oscar-winning film Darling, and gay ex-pat Freddie Martin in the BBC soap opera Eldorado, which was made and set on the Costa del Sol. In 1979, he played Brian Pilbeam in the first series of Terry and June. The Pilbeams were Terry and June's annoying neighbours until the Sprys moved in.

He also starred as Harold Perkins in the acclaimed BBC TV series Big Jim and the Figaro Club which was broadcast in July and August 1981.

Curram was married from 1964 until 1985 to the actress Sheila Gish, with whom he had two daughters, the actors Lou Gish (1967–2006) and Kay Curram (born 1974). He came out as gay in the early 1990s, and left acting to carve out a second career as a novelist. Curram died from kidney failure and prostate cancer on 1 June 2025, at the age of 92. He was survived by his partner, Clive.

== Performances and works ==
=== Selected filmography ===
- Up to His Neck (1954)
- The Admirable Crichton (1957)
- Dunkirk (1958)
- The Green Helmet (1961)
- Incident at Midnight (1963) (Edgar Wallace Mysteries)
- The Silent Playground (1963)
- Darling (1965)
- I'll Never Forget What's'isname (1967)
- Decline and Fall... of a Birdwatcher (1968)
- Every Home Should Have One (1970)
- Ooh... You Are Awful (1972)
- Hardcore (1977)
- Let's Get Laid (1978)
- Terry and June 4eps (1979)
- Madame Sousatzka (1988)
- Eldorado 1992
- Parting Shots (1999)

=== Bibliography ===
- Man on the Beach (2004)
- The Rose Secateurs (2007)
- Mother Loved Funerals (2009)
- The Problem with Happiness (2012)

== See also ==
- List of British actors
