= Where No Vultures Fly =

- Original British Film poster
- Directed by: Harry Watt
- Written by: W. P. Lipscomb; Leslie Norman; Ralph Smart
- Based on: story by Harry Watt
- Produced by: Michael Balcon
- Starring: Anthony Steel; Dinah Sheridan
- Cinematography: Geoffrey Unsworth
- Edited by: Jack Harris; Gordon Stone
- Music by: Alan Rawsthorne
- Production companies: Ealing Studios; African Film Productions
- Distributed by: General Film Distributors
- Release dates: 5 November 1951 (Royal Command Film Performance); 6 November 1951 (United Kingdom); 18 August 1952 (United States)
- Running time: 107 minutes
- Countries: United Kingdom; South Africa
- Language: English
- Box office: £152,000

Where No Vultures Fly is a 1951 British adventure film directed by Harry Watt and starring Anthony Steel and Dinah Sheridan. It was released under the title Ivory Hunter in the United States. The film was inspired by the work of the conservationist Mervyn Cowie. The film's opening credits state that "the characters in this film are imaginary, but the story is based on the recent struggle of Mervyn Cowie to form the National Parks of Kenya." The title Where No Vultures Fly denotes areas where there are no dead animals. A sequel, West of Zanzibar, was released in 1954.

== Plot ==
The film is set in East Africa near the boundary between Kenya and Tanzania. The story follows the early days of game warden Bob Payton (Anthony Steel) in his establishment of a 1000 square mile wildlife reserve. He is horrified by the destruction of wild animals by ivory hunters. He establishes a wildlife sanctuary. He is attacked by wild animals and must contend with a villainous ivory poacher (Harold Warrender).

When he confronts the ivory poacher in a remote area one night the poacher's native accomplices spear him in the leg and run off. As a leopard is about to attack the injured Payton one of his own native helpers comes to his rescue. The poacher meets a fatal end when his jeep is chased over a cliff by a rhinoceros.

== Featured cast ==
Actor	Role
Anthony Steel	Bob Payton
Dinah Sheridan	Mary Payton
Harold Warrender	Mannering
Meredith Edwards	Gwyl
William Simons	Tim Payton
Orlando Martins	M'Kwongi

== Production ==
=== Development ===
Where No Vultures Fly was one of a series of "expeditionary films" Harry Watt made, like The Overlanders, where he would find the story from visiting a location. "These expeditionary films are really journalistic jobs", he wrote later. "You get sent out to a country by the studio, stay as long as you can without being fired and a story generally crops up."

Watt got the idea of the film after a chance remark from a game warden in Tanganyika. He was shooting zebras and when Watt wondered if it was necessary, the warden remarked that Watt "talk like Mervyn Cowie". This prompted the director to track down Cowie in Nairobi, who inspired the story.

W. P. Lipscomb wrote the script based on Harry Watt's original idea. Ralph Smart worked on it. According to Leslie Norman "the script was turned down generally, so I went in and added a bit which made them accept it."

The film was a co-production between Ealing and South Africa's African Films, with half the financing coming from South Africa. (Africa Films was a South African theatre chain.)

=== Shooting ===
Dinah Sheridan flew to Kenya at the end of November 1950 for a four-month shoot. Watt took a full unit to Africa and based it at Amboseli, south of Nairobi. They built a complete village of huts for the crew to live in.

Anthony Steel contracted malaria during filming on location in Kenya.

== Reception ==
The film was selected for the 1951 Royal Command Performance, over other contenders such as A Place in the Sun and Outcast of the Islands, becoming the last one during the reign of George VI.

=== Critical response ===
Variety praised the photography but felt the film had been given "false value by the Command selection".

According to Filmink "this played more to his strengths" than Watt's previous movie Eureka Stockade with "location filming, based on a true story, simple concept."

=== Box office ===
It was the second most popular film at the British box office in 1952. It also made $800,000 in the US, which was considered strong at the time for a British film. It made Anthony Steel a star of British cinema.

In 1957, the film and its sequel were listed among the seventeen most popular films the Rank organisation ever released in the US.
