= Tiger of the Seven Seas =

- Directed by: Luigi Capuano
- Cinematography: Alvaro Mancori
- Music by: Carlo Rustichelli
- Release date: 1962
- Country: Italy
- Language: Italian

La tigre dei sette mari, internationally released as Tiger of the Seven Seas, is a 1962 Italian adventure film directed by Luigi Capuano.

It was a sequel to Queen of the Pirates.

== Plot ==
Consuelo is the daughter of a famous pirate nicknamed the Tiger. When he feels tired and decides to leave the command of the ship, he chooses to give it to the winner of a challenge among his men, but unexpectedly, Consuelo wins. The same night Tiger is killed.

William is charged with the killing and is due to be executed, but before the sentence could be carried out, the Spaniards of Grand Duke Inigo arrive.

Consuelo and William escape. At first they don't trust each other but Consuelo discovers that William was falsely blamed; they take revenge on the traitor and recover Tiger's treasure.

== Cast ==
- Gianna Maria Canale as Consuelo
- Anthony Steel as William Scott
- Maria Grazia Spina as Anna de Cordoba
- Ernesto Calindri as Inigo de Cordoba
- Andrea Aureli as Robert
- Carlo Ninchi as Tiger
- John Kitzmiller as Serpente
- Carlo Pisacane as Pirate
- Nazzareno Zamperla as Rick

== Production ==
Anthony Steel had recently settled permanently in Italy.

== Reception ==
Monthly Film Bulletin called it "a dull, mechanical affair."

Filmink said Steel "is the male lead for pirate queen Gianna Maria Canale, who beats him in a sword duel and has to rescue him later. Which is surprisingly and enjoyably feminist but presumably helped further dint Steel’s already-fragile ego. Incidentally, the film indicates that the actor’s physical appearance was starting to disintegrate – he was still handsome with all his hair and no gut, but his face was appearing increasingly gaunt and tired."
