= Georgina Moon =

English actress born circa 1950

- Born: c. 1950
- Occupation: Actress
- Years active: 1963–present
- Father: George Moon

Georgina Moon (born c. 1950) is a British actress of stage, film and television.

Her television roles include Lieutenant Sylvia Howell in UFO, Erotica in Up Pompeii!, Rose Bivaque in Clochemerle, Miss Finch in You're Only Young Twice and Christine Cropper in How's Your Father? (1974–1975).

She has featured in several films, including Carry On Camping, Bless This House and Carry On Behind.

She is the daughter of actor George Moon.

== Selected filmography ==
- The Mind Benders as Persephone (1963)
- The Assassination Bureau (1969)
- Carry On Camping (1969) as Joy
- Up Pompeii! as Erotica (TV series, 1969)
- Fragment of Fear (1970)
- UFO as Lieutenant Sylvia Howell (TV series, 1970)
- Bless This House (1972)
- Carry On Behind (1975)
- You're Only Young Twice as Miss Finch (TV sitcom, 1977–81)
