= Something Money Can't Buy =

1952 film by Pat Jackson

- British Quad poster by Dougie Post
- Directed by: Pat Jackson
- Written by: Pat Jackson; J.L. Hodson
- Produced by: Joseph Janni
- Starring: Anthony Steel; Patricia Roc; Moira Lister
- Cinematography: C. M. Pennington-Richards
- Edited by: Sidney Hayers
- Music by: Nino Rota
- Production companies: British Film-Makers; Vic Films
- Distributed by: General Film Distributors
- Release date: 9 July 1952
- Running time: 83 minutes
- Country: United Kingdom
- Language: English
- Box office: £121,000

Something Money Can't Buy is a 1952 British comedy drama film directed by Pat Jackson and starring Patricia Roc, Anthony Steel and Moira Lister. It was written by Jackson and J.L. Hodson, and distributed by Rank's General Film Distributors. In America it was released by Universal Pictures in 1953.

== Plot ==
Harry and Anne Wilding return to civilian life after service in the army. They have trouble readjusting, and Harry eventually resigns from his council job and goes into business, selling food from a mobile canteen. Anne becomes jealous of the daughter of Harry's backer. Anne gives up her job to concentrate on her marriage.

== Cast ==
- Patricia Roc as Anne Wilding
- Anthony Steel as Captain Harry Wilding
- Moira Lister as Diana Haverstock
- A. E. Matthews as Lord Haverstock
- David Hutcheson as Buster
- Michael Trubshawe as Willy
- Diane Hart as Joan
- Charles Victor as Borough Treasurer
- Henry Edwards as Gerald Forbes
- Mary Hinton as Mrs. Forbes
- Joss Ambler as Mr. Burton, the auctioneer
- Michael Brennan as fairground boss
- Helen Goss as Mrs. Lindstrom
- D. A. Clarke-Smith as critic
- Mara Lane as film star
- John Barry as film star
- Joe Linnane as cameraman
- Dennis Arundell as director
- Oscar Quitak as 2nd assistant director
- Irene Prador as German maid
- Olwen Brookes as lady at party
- Margaret Vyner as actress at party
- Basil Dignam as head waiter
- Johnnie Schofield as Irish policeman
- Fred Griffiths as customer at fairground
- Ernie Rice as boxing booth assistant
- Avice Landone as maternity Sister
- Dandy Nichols as reassuring mother

== Production ==
The film was made through British Film-Makers, a short lived production scheme that operated in Britain in the early 1950s as a co operative venture between the Rank Organisation and the National Film Finance Corporation (NFFC), whereby Rank would provide 70% of finance and the rest came from the NFFC.

Patrick Macnee wrote in his memoirs that he auditioned for the male lead, and Pat Jackson wanted him rather than Anthony Steel, but Macnee had a few alcoholic drinks to calm his nerves and did a poor audition.

The film was shot at Pinewood Studios near London. The film's sets were designed by the art director Alex Vetchinsky. The film was a rare comedy role for Steel, who made it immediately prior to shooting The Planter's Wife (1952). It involved Roc returning to London after two years in Paris, where she lived with her French husband. She and Steel had an affair during the making of the movie which resulted in Roc having Steel's baby.

It was the only comedy Steel made while a star.

Pat Jackson later said "It ought to have been a good film, it had a certain charm, the story had a certain charm. I think I just did it badly, I directed badly, I don't know what it was, it just didn't work. It was my fault and that was it; it was as simple as that...It needed great lightness of touch, which I didn't get... It was all in the script, the script was charming. I think James and I wrote a nice script and he was a great help and a wonderful man, James. But no. I botched it."

== Reception ==
=== Box office ===
According to internal Rank documentation, the film's box office performance was "average" with billings of £121,000.

=== Critical ===
Variety wrote, "the plot is slender enough, but the script resorts to an unnecessary degree of padding to keep the story moving. It’s mainly played, however, in a light key, with a few chuckles and odd moments of pathos. Film has been smoothly directed, and Patricia Roc and Anthony Steel play husband and wife roles in frothy style."

The Monthly Film Bulletin described it as "a double disappointment from the director of White Corridors; the poverty-stricken material apart, its staging is uncharacteristically flabby, with none of the polish and professionalism of its predecessor."

Filmink thought the film "starts out interestingly... but spins off into weird, dull subplots about work.

In British Sound Films: The Studio Years 1928–1959 David Quinlan rated the film as "mediocre", writing: "Occasionally funny comedy hasn't sufficient comic situations or invention in script."

== Radio adaptation ==
The film was adapted for Australian radio in 1954.

== Bibliography ==
- Harper, Sue & Porter, Vincent. British Cinema of the 1950s: The Decline of Deference. Oxford University Press, 2007.
