= Baby Love (1969 film) =

1969 British film by Alastair Reid

- Theatrical release poster
- Directed by: Alastair Reid
- Screenplay by: Alastair Reid; Guido Coen; Michael Klinger
- Based on: Baby Love by Tina Chad Christian
- Produced by: Guido Coen
- Starring: Ann Lynn; Keith Barron; Linda Hayden
- Cinematography: Desmond Dickinson
- Edited by: John Glen
- Music by: Max Harris
- Production company: Avton Film
- Distributed by: AVCO Embassy Pictures
- Release dates: 19 March 1969 (New York City); 20 April 1969 (United Kingdom)
- Running time: 96 minutes
- Country: United Kingdom
- Language: English
- Budget: £87,084
- Box office: over $1,300,000

Baby Love is a 1969 British drama film directed by Alastair Reid and starring Diana Dors, Linda Hayden, Keith Barron and Ann Lynn. It was written by Reid, Guido Coen and Michael Klinger, based on the 1968 novel Baby Love by Tina Chad Christian.

The film tells the story of a 15-year-old schoolgirl who seduces her adoptive family after her mother commits suicide.

== Plot ==
Luci Thompson is a 15-year-old schoolgirl whose mother Liz, suffering from cancer, commits suicide. She goes to live with Robert Quayle, a childhood friend of Liz's, who is married to Amy and has a son, Nick. Luci’s arrival causes sexual and psychological tensions to surface, bringing the family close to destruction.

== Cast ==
- Anne Lynn as Amy Quayle
- Keith Barron as Robert Quayle
- Linda Hayden as Luci Thompson
- Diana Dors as Liz Thompson
- Troy Dante as lover
- Sheila Steafel as Tessa Pearson
- Dick Emery as Harry Pearson
- Lewis Wilson as priest
- Derek Lamden as Nick Quayle
- Patience Collier as Mrs Carmichael
- Terence Brady as man in shop
- Marianne Stone as manageress
- Christine Proyor as shop girl
- Yvonne Hormer as shop girl
- Vernon Dobtcheff as man in cinema
- Linbert Spencer as West Indian
- Sally Stephens as Margo Pearson
- Timothy Carlton as Admiral
- Christopher Witty as boat crew
- Julian Barnes as boat crew
- Michael Lewis as boat crew
- Katch 22 as themselves
- Bruce Robinson as man in nightclub (uncredited)

== Production ==
The film was based on the debut novel by Tina Chad Christian. Film rights were bought by producer Michael Klinger, who had just left Compton, a production company he had run with Tony Tenser. Baby Love would be his first movie as an independent producer.

The first director attached was Henri Safran. Linda Hayden was cast after an extensive talent search. She was only fifteen years old and had to do her screen test topless. Safran was fired by Klinger and replaced by Alastair Reid. Hayden said "Michael got rid of him because I don’t think he didn’t like what he saw, or something, but ...er... it was just that little bits of it were a bit tacky."

Most of the finance came from Star Cinemas in the UK. Klinger sold the film to Joseph Levine of Anglo-Embassy for over $1 million. Hayden later said the film was "one of those projects that could so easily have gone wrong. It could have been a bit sleazy. Alastair made the film more grounded, so it wasn’t just done for sensationalism."

Hayden recalled Diana Dors "hadn’t had a resurgence then; she was still yesterday’s news. And then suddenly, as the film came out, she had a resurgence. She was terrific. They did use her name quite a lot to hang the film on and it certainly paid off. She was quite a coup, and a smashing lady. I loved her. Her character casts a long shadow over the film. It needed somebody like that to do it." The film helped revive her career.

== Reception ==
=== Box Office ===
The film was the 11th most watched movie of the year in the UK in 1969. The film took over half a million dollars in both the North America and the UK, and over $300,000 in other territories.

=== Critical reception ===
The Monthly Film Bulletin wrote: "Alastair Reid's film makes no attempt to modify the crude contrasts and lurid events that formed the basis of Tina Chad Christian's first novel: the poverty of the northern slum and the ultra-chic of the doctor's environment remain equally overstated, shown essentially as they appear to the self-dramatising nymphet heroine. But partly because we are spared the precocious auto-analysis of Luci's commentary and her behaviour thus goes largely unexplained by any facile clinical labels, the film somehow transcends its inherent sensationalism and the gloss of its surfaces."

Howard Thompson of The New York Times gave the film a positive review, praising the technical brilliance and writing: "Ugly as it is in flavor and content, the picture is a genuine pint-sized spellbinder in construction, mood and mounting tension."

Variety wrote: "An attempt to put a sophisticated shine on this limp pic does not disguise the fact that it is basically an essay in sex, with the producers relying on some titillation and the introducing, in the current mood, of a teenage nymphet. Most of the 'sell' will obviously circle around Linda Hayden, who gets 'introducing' billing. At 15, she makes her debut in this kinky pic. It may do okay in non-discriminating situations. More sophisticated viewers may experience boredom and distaste."

Reviewing the 2015 DVD release, Vic Pratt wrote for Sight and Sound: "Titillation takes second place to frustration in Baby Love, and nobody in this bleak, fascinating film seems to find much pleasure – sordid or otherwise – in anything. ... Director Alastair Reid conjures up a frozen world of middle-class ennui for Luci to fracture, delineated by dreary card games and drunken marital disputes in drafty, football-pitch-sized beds, where awkward feelings are quashed by yet another cognac from the crystal decanter."
