= Lou Gish =

British actress (1967–2006)

- Born: Louise Mikel Henrietta Marie Curram; 27 May 1967; London, England
- Died: 20 February 2006 (aged 38); London, England
- Occupation: Actress
- Years active: 1996–2005
- Partner: Nicholas Rowe (2000–2006, her death)
- Parents: Roland Curram (father); Sheila Gish (mother)

Lou Gish (27 May 1967 – 20 February 2006), born Louise Mikel Henrietta Marie Curram, was an English stage, film, and television actress.

== Early life and education ==
Louise Mikel Henrietta Marie Curram was born in London on 27 May 1967, the elder daughter of actors Sheila Gish and Roland Curram.

She was educated at Macaulay Church of England Primary School in Clapham, Alleyns School in Dulwich, and Furzedown School in Wandsworth. After finishing her schooling, she attended the Camberwell College of Arts.

== Career ==
Gish worked in various jobs until her mid-twenties, when she finally realised that what she really wanted to do was act.

Over the course of her career, she played a variety of roles on the stage as well as on screen, in television series and films. She appeared with her sister, Kay Curram, in King Lear at the Chichester Festival Theatre in 2005.

== Personal life and death ==
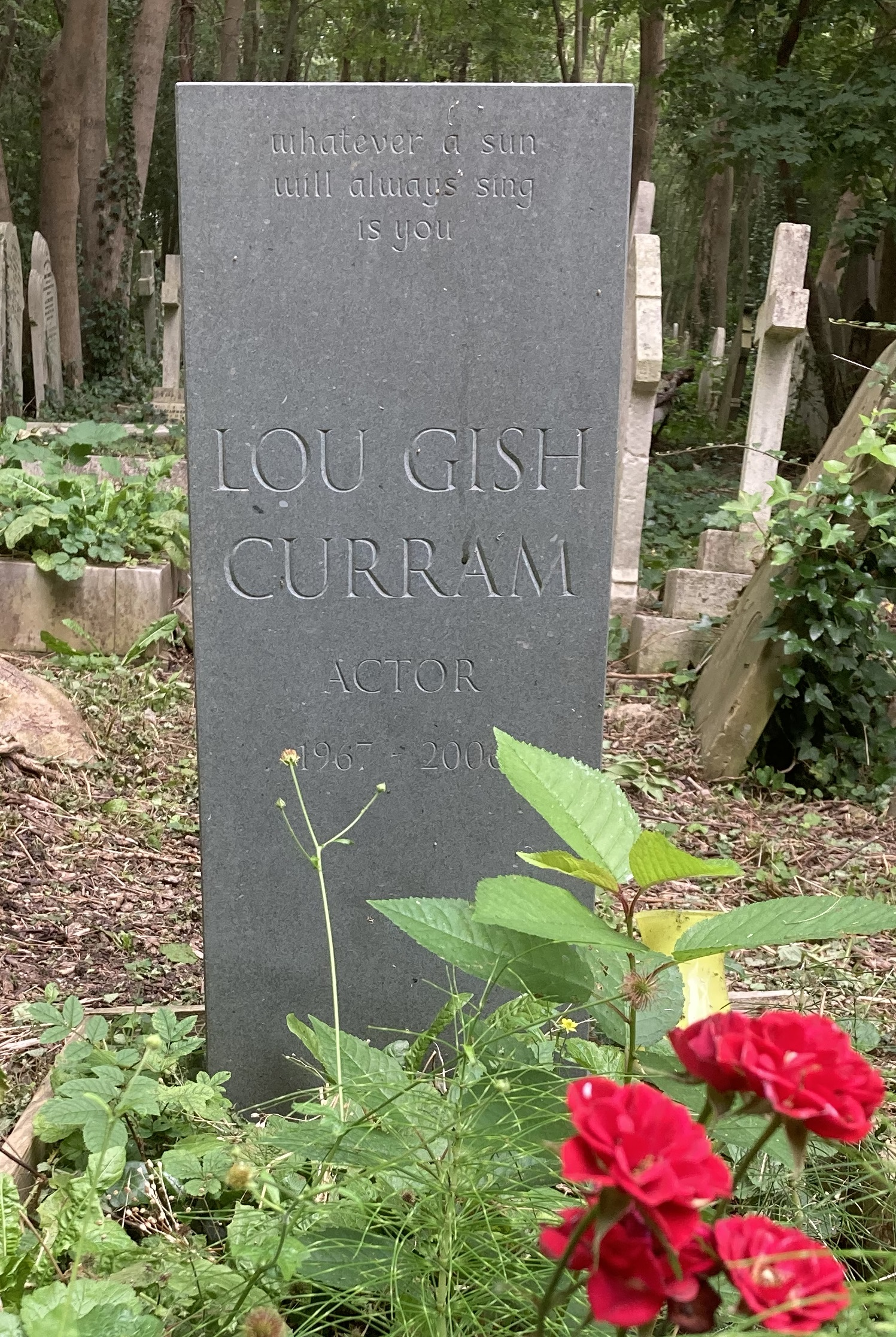
Grave of Lou Gish in Highgate Cemetery

Gish was in a relationship with actor Nicholas Rowe from 2000 until her death from cancer on 20 February 2006, at the age of 38.

Her death came less than a year after her mother, who also died of cancer. Both she and her mother are buried on the eastern side of Highgate Cemetery.

== Film and television career ==
- Amazed – "Kara Smith" (1983)
- Game On – "Bruce Willis & Robert De Niro Holding a Fish" (1996)
- Holding the Baby (1997)
- Bent (1997)
- Microsoap (1998)
- Hope and Glory (1999)
- Casualty – "Blood Brothers" (2000)
- Without Motive (2000)
- Where the Heart Is – "Runaways" (2001)
- Coupling (2001–2002)
- The Vice – "One More Time" (2002)
- Wire in the Blood – "Shadows Rising" (2002)
- Doctors – "High Anxiety" (2004)
- Casualty – "Love's Labours ... Lost" (2004)
- EastEnders (2004–2005)
- New Tricks (2005)

== Theatrical career ==
- Tejas Verdes (Gate Theatre 2005)
- King Lear (Chichester Festival Theatre 2005, as Goneril)
