= What Rats Won't Do =

1998 film by Alastair Reid

- Directed by: Alastair Reid
- Written by: William Osborne
- Starring: James Frain; Natascha McElhone
- Music by: John Murphy
- Release date: 1 July 1998
- Running time: 1h 28min
- Country: United Kingdom
- Language: English

What Rats Won't Do is a 1998 British comedy film directed by Alastair Reid and starring James Frain and Natascha McElhone.

== Plot ==
Kate Beckenham is hired by American heiress Mirella Burton to defend Burton's claim to the £15million estate of her deceased husband against his son Gerald. Gerald has hired lawyer Jack Sullivan, who has never lost a case in court. Burton has hired Alex Leam, who has never won one. Though Beckenham is engaged, she finds herself attracted to Sullivan.

== Cast ==
- James Frain – Jack Sullivan
- Natascha McElhone – Kate Beckenham
- Amy Phillips – Ellen
- Valentine Pelka – Graham
- Samantha Bond – Jane
- Freddie Jones – Judge Foster
- Chris Jury – Defendant
- Peter Capaldi – Tony
- W. Stephen Gilbert – Foster's Clerk
- Harry Enfield – Verger
