= Something to Hide (film) =

- Directed by: Alastair Reid
- Written by: Alastair Reid
- Produced by: Michael Klinger
- Starring: Peter Finch; Shelley Winters; Colin Blakely; Linda Hayden
- Cinematography: Wolfgang Suschitzky
- Edited by: Reginald Beck
- Music by: Roy Budd
- Production company: Avton Films
- Distributed by: Avco Embassy (UK)
- Release date: 1972
- Running time: 99 minutes
- Country: United Kingdom
- Language: English

Something to Hide (in the U.S. also reissued as Shattered) is a 1972 British thriller film directed by Alastair Reid and starring Peter Finch, Shelley Winters, Colin Blakely, Linda Hayden and John Stride. It was written by Reid based on the 1963 novel of the same title by Nicholas Monsarrat. A man harassed by his shrewish wife, after picking up a pregnant teenage hitchhiker, is driven to murder and madness. The film was not released commercially in the USA until 1976.

== Plot ==
Harry Field is a middle-aged office worker living on the Isle of Wight. Noticing his frequent trips to London without his wife, his friends assume that she has left him. Returning from one of his trips he picks up teenage hitch-hiker Lorelei, who is heavily pregnant. Field lets her stay with him, and he has to unexpectedly deliver her baby, which dies. Lorelei flees and when Field disposes of the baby's body in his garden incinerator, the smell is noticed with suspicion by local ice-cream-man Dibbick. Field confesses to Dibbick that he murdered his wife and buried her on the beach. He then kills a policeman, runs to the beach, and shoots himself on his wife's grave.

== Cast ==
- Peter Finch as Harry Field
- Shelley Winters as Gabriella
- Colin Blakely as Blagdon
- John Stride as Sergeant Tom Winnington
- Linda Hayden as Lorelei
- Harold Goldblatt as Dibbick
- Rosemarie Dunham as Elsie
- Helen Fraser as Miss Bunyan
- Jack Shepherd as Joe Pepper
- Graham Crowden as lay preacher

== Reception ==
The Monthly Film Bulletin wrote: "Something to Hide is certainly an apt title for this half-cock curiosity which – whatever Nicholas Monsarrat may originally have intended – clearly has pretensions to being a psychological thriller along Hitchcock lines. Thanks mainly to the reticent professionalism of Peter Finch's playing, there are moments between the frenetic prologue and preposterous denouement when tension succeeds in tugging at one's dozing nerve-ends. But Alastair Reid is so determined to air every cliché in the British B-feature manual (including such ripe gems as the rear-view, mistaken identity charade) that numbness swiftly re-establishes itself. ... Finch apart, the acting is, to put it kindly, variable. Shelley Winters crams all she can into her one brief scene of alcoholic hysteria; Linda Hayden finds the script an even bigger millstone than Lorelei's unwanted baby; and it is just bad luck on poor John Stride that he is required to play the most improbable policeman since P.C. 49."

Variety wrote: "This Peter Finch-Shelley Winters starrer might do okay in quick spin-offs before audiences realize that Miss Winters appears only in the first 10 minutes of pic and is then never seen again. Her acting tour-de-force in those minutes makes everything that comes after it seem anticlimactic and dull so that audiences may feel cheated by the big-name come-on. Peter Finch puts in another fine performance, but yarn is so tenuous that it undermines the pacing, sound direction and otherwise good credits which might have worked for the film."

Boxoffice wrote: "Star value is the best asset of this modest British thriller, which almost lives up to its title as far as the players are concerned. Peter Finch, Linda Hayden and, in the opening sequence, Shelley Winters perform admirably under Alastair Reid's direction. ... Finch is his usual accomplished self, although it's difficult to accept him as the deluded neurotic he's supposed to be, while Ms. Hayden is not at all sympathetic as a teenaged mother-to-be, a nice plot gimmick."
