= Johnnie Wade =

British actor (born 1932)

- Born: John Webb; 30 March 1932 (age 94); Bethnal Green, London, England
- Occupations: Film actor Television actor
- Years active: 1964–2000

Johnnie Wade (born John Webb; 30 March 1932) is a retired British film and television actor. He played the put upon handyman 'Roger' in the ITV Yorkshire TV comedy series You're Only Young Twice between 1977 and 1981.

Born in Bethnal Green, he was a market trader and became a singer in cabaret and with a band after winning talent contests. His first television break was in 1960s soap opera Compact as Stan Millet. He then performed in musicals including South Pacific and Guys and Dolls. His other television appearances include The Two Ronnies, Porridge (playing 'Scrounger'), Coronation Street and Z-Cars.

== Selected filmography ==
- The Body Stealers (1969)
- Carry On Again Doctor (1969)
- For the Love of Ada (1972)
- The Stick-Up (1977)
- You're Only Young Twice (1977-1981)
- The Music Machine (1979)
- Shillingbury Tales (1980)
- George and Mildred (1980)
- Funny Money (1983)

== Discography ==
As Johnny Wade:

A: Funny Thing. B: Shadow Love. His Master's Voice, UK, POP 757, 7", June 1960

A: Andiamo. B: You Fool Of A Heart. Piccadilly Records, UK, 7N 35076, 7", September 1962.

A: Paradise. B: Looking For Me. Piccadilly, UK, 7N 35115, 7", April 1963
