= A Matter of Choice =

1963 British film by Vernon Sewell

- Opening titles
- Directed by: Vernon Sewell
- Written by: Paul Ryder
- Story by: Derren Nesbitt; Vernon Sewell
- Produced by: George Maynard
- Starring: Malcolm Gerard; Michael Davis; Anthony Steel; Jeanne Moody; Ballard Berkeley
- Cinematography: Arthur Lavis
- Edited by: Lee Doig
- Music by: Robert Sharples (composed & conducted by)
- Production company: Holmwood Productions
- Distributed by: British Lion Films (UK)
- Release date: 3 July 1963 (UK)
- Running time: 79 minutes
- Country: United Kingdom
- Language: English
- Budget: £23,671

A Matter of Choice is a 1963 British black and white drama film directed by Vernon Sewell and starring Malcolm Gerard, Michael Davis, Anthony Steel, Jeanne Moody and Ballard Berkeley. The screenplay was by Paul Ryder based on an original story by Sewell and Derren Nesbitt.

It was one of a number of low budget British films Steel made in the 1960s while based in Rome.

== Plot ==
Mike and Tony are two youths out looking for girls and entertainment. After a chaotic evening, they accidentally knock a policeman into the path of a car. As they flee the scene the male passenger, John Crighton, runs after them. Mike throws a brick at Crighton and he collapses unconscious. Panicking, they move him to the unlocked garage of a nearby house, owned by businessman Charles Grant, and anonymously call an ambulance. Crighton, a diabetic, subsequently dies in hospital. When the police arrive Grant discovers that his wife Lisa has been having an affair with Crighton.

== Cast ==
- Malcolm Gerard as Mike
- Michael Davis as Tony
- Anthony Steel as John Crighton
- Jeanne Moody as Lisa Grant
- Ballard Berkeley as Charles Grant
- Penny Morrell as Jackie
- Lisa Peake as Jane
- James Bree as Alfred
- George Moon as Spike
- Richard Bebb as waiter
- Garard Green as shopkeeper
- Frank Pettitt as police sergeant
- Frank Shelley as police doctor

== Production ==
Sewell called the film "a disaster":

I had been working with this man and, I had said, "I won't work with you again." And he writes to me, he says, "Look here, I've got a contract, I can make your story, 'Matter of Choice.'" I said, "No, absolutely out, absolutely out!" He said, "Well, would you sell me the script?" I said, "That, I will do," and I sold him the script. Then his wife rings me up and says, "Vernon, I'm in a desperate position. George can't get the film floated without you, and if he doesn't do it, this is our last chance, he's going to kill himself." I should have said, "Well let him do it" but I didn't. I said, "Well now, OK, if I do this, is it going to be, (this, this, this and this?)?" She said, "Yes, it's all wonderful." Of course when I got to it, the sets were terrible, the whole thing was a disaster, disaster. I don't think it appeared at all, I don't think it was ever shown. The idea of the story was good, but, you see, it had to be – he said he had a find, a wonderful new star, and I gave her the sack the first day, couldn't work. Tony Steel was in it and was pissed all the time. Oh it was a disaster... a bloody awful movie, because the thing was buggered up.

== Critical reception ==
The Monthly Film Bulletin wrote: "This very moral tale, dependent for its dénouement on the thundering coincidence that assembles all five characters in the same mews flat, is slow as a thriller and despite its incursions into social realism, notably in the portrayal of Mike and Tony, unexciting on any other level."

== Home media ==
The film was released on DVD, paired with Jungle Street (1960), by Odeon Entertainment in 2008.
