= You're Only Young Twice =

British television sitcom (1977–1981)

- Genre: Sitcom
- Created by: Pam Valentine; Michael Ashton
- Written by: Pam Valentine; Michael Ashton
- Directed by: Graeme Muir
- Starring: Peggy Mount; Pat Coombs; Lally Bowers; Diana King; Charmian May; Georgina Moon; Johnny Wade; Peggy Ledger
- Composer: Dennis Wilson
- Country of origin: United Kingdom
- Original language: English
- No. of series: 4
- No. of episodes: 31

Production
- Producer: Graeme Muir
- Production company: Yorkshire Television

Original release
- Network: ITV
- Release: 6 September 1977 – 11 August 1981

You're Only Young Twice is a British television sitcom made and broadcast on the ITV network by Yorkshire Television from 6 September 1977 to 11 August 1981.

== Plot ==
Set in Paradise Lodge retirement home, You're Only Young Twice was created and written by the writing partnership of Michael Ashton and Pam Valentine. It starred Peggy Mount as Flora Petty, with Pat Coombs as her sidekick Cissie Lupin. Paradise Lodge was described by Network DVD as "a superior residence for retired gentlefolk".

The majority of the thirty-one episodes centre on resident Flora's attempts to thwart the long-suffering staff, led by Miss Milton (Charmian May). They are occasionally assisted by former theatrical artiste Dolly Love (played by veteran stage actress Lally Bowers) and the haughty Mildred Fanshaw (sitcom regular Diana King).

It was produced by Yorkshire Television for the ITV network.

== Cast ==
- Peggy Mount as Flora Petty
- Pat Coombs as Cissie Lupin
- Lally Bowers as Dolly Love
- Diana King as Mildred Fanshawe
- Charmian May as Miss Marjorie Milton
- Georgina Moon as Miss Finch
- Johnny Wade as Roger
- George Innes as Sergeant Hobble
- Peggy Ledger as Katy O'Rourke (series 1-2)

== Episodes ==
31 episodes were broadcast, across four series and two Christmas specials.

| Series | Episodes | Originally released | |
| Series | Episodes | First released | Last released |
|---|---|---|---|
| 1 | 7 | 6 September 1977 | 18 October 1977 |
| 2 | 8 | 5 June 1978 | 24 July 1978 |
| 3 | 7 | 31 May 1979 | 12 July 1979 |
| Christmas specials | 2 | 24 December 1979 | 23 December 1980 |
| 4 | 7 | 23 June 1981 | 11 August 1981 |

=== Series 1 (1977) ===
| No. | Title | Directed by | Original release date |
|---|---|---|---|
| 1 | "Stranger in Paradise" | Graeme Muir | 6 September 1977 |
Formidable Flora Petty dominates the Paradise Lodge retirement home, arguing with fellow residents Dolly, Katie and Mildred, as well as dominating her friend Cissie. When a superior room becomes vacant, the ladies draw lots for it, only for it to be taken by a new - male - resident (guest star Robert Raglan). However, when he leaves, Flora has a plan to persuade owner Miss Milton to let her move in. She is innocently thwarted by kind-hearted Cissie.
| 2 | "Raising the Roof" | Graeme Muir | 13 September 1977 |
When the vicar needs £500 to mend the church roof, Flora suggests a charity performance of The Sound of Music, but it is a disaster, leading to ex-actress Dolly putting on a show, which Flora sabotages in order to do her fake mind-reading act with Cissie. However, when the vicar decides he only needs a two minute contribution, it is Cissie and her rendition of "The Merry Peasant" which is called upon to fill the bill.
| 3 | "One of Life's Winners" | Graeme Muir | 20 September 1977 |
When Cissie wins a car in a competition, encouraging the other ladies to rifle the store cupboard to collect coupons to emulate her, Flora is determined to get into the act, posing with Cissie for the local paper's photographer, and, on learning that Cissie cannot drive, offering to take it off her hands - though she is in for a shock when the car is delivered.
| 4 | "The Ball Game" | Graeme Muir | 27 September 1977 |
When Cissie accidentally buys a crystal ball Dolly foretells misfortune, especially for Flora, but after Cissie has let in a man claiming to be the window-cleaner but is actually a burglar, Flora is the only resident not to have been robbed. She sets out to find the culprit but ends up attacking a policeman (guest star George Innes), whom she mistakes for the thief, thus bringing credence to Dolly's prophecy.
| 5 | "The Birthday Girl" | Graeme Muir | 4 October 1977 |
On her birthday, Flora is characteristically withering about the cards and presents received from staff and other residents, but perks up when Cissie tells her she has a surprise for her. It is a visit to the circus, but Flora wrongly assumes it is a colour television and tries to hypnotize Cissie into giving it to her. The hypnotism works - but not on Cissie.
| 6 | "The Royal Visit" | Graeme Muir | 11 October 1977 |
Paradise Lodge is expecting a visit from The Queen, and the ladies resort to bribing Miss Milton and holding an election to decide who will present a bouquet to the royal visitor. In the event, Cissie wins, to Flora's annoyance, and Flora resorts to a fake sob story to persuade her friend to relinquish the privilege. Miss Milton, however, is wise to Flora's tactics.
| 7 | "Too Many Cooks" | Graeme Muir | 18 October 1977 |
Flora decides to throw an anniversary dinner in memory of her late husband, and entrusts the cooking to Cissie, which is not a good idea, as a mix-up of labels leads to Epsom salts being substituted for common salt, giving the diners the runs. The labels are replaced but somehow history manages to repeat itself - literally.

=== Series 2 (1978) ===
| No. | Title | Directed by | Original release date |
|---|---|---|---|
| 1 | "The Box Number" | Graeme Muir | 5 June 1978 |
Cissie places an innocent advert in the local paper, requesting somebody with whom she can swap crochet patterns, but the ambiguous wording attracts a mountain of unsavoury replies, leading Flora to believe her friend is in danger from a stalker. She sets a trap for him, and although his (guest star Arthur White) intentions are honourable, it gives Flora the idea of placing an ad of her own. Note: A line from a scene in this episode has been censored in future reruns.
| 2 | "The Windfall" | Graeme Muir | 12 June 1978 |
A tipsy Cissie returns from her late uncle Bert's funeral with a shoe-box containing £10,000 that he has left her. Greedy Flora is of course only too happy to help her spend the money, to her own advantage. Unfortunately, nobody has told her that the notes were counterfeit.
| 3 | "The Commercial" | Graeme Muir | 19 June 1978 |
On the strength of one of her old films being shown on television, Dolly is offered a part in a bread commercial, but when the director (guest star Robert Dorning) arrives at the home, he feels she is too glamorous to play a homely grandmother. Flora is naturally happy to step forward to take over, but it is Cissie who lands the role.
| 4 | "The White Elephant" | Graeme Muir | 26 June 1978 |
Having been banned from most of the shops in town, Flora returns from Peabody's Department store - and a traumatic visit to the cinema - with a new model elephant for her collection. However, she suddenly realises that she has forgotten to pay for it, and enlists the help of Cissie, Dolly and Mildred to disguise themselves in an effort to return it.
| 5 | "The Foundling" | Graeme Muir | 3 July 1978 |
Flora is disturbed late at night by a baby's crying, and when she discovers the child left on the doorstep (by its grandfather, guest star Joe Gladwin), it falls on the ladies of Paradise Lodge to care for him, or her.
| 6 | "The Deputy" | Graeme Muir | 10 July 1978 |
Miss Milton is incapacitated after an accident with a ladder, so Paradise Lodge is placed in the hands of a disciplinarian former sergeant major (guest star David Lodge), whose rigid rules cause Flora to lead a roof top protest.
| 7 | "The Spring Fayre" | Graeme Muir | 17 July 1978 |
The church's Spring Fayre is approaching, but Flora has fallen out with the vicar's wife, who consequently bans her from attending. However, Flora blackmails Miss Milton, the fair's organiser, into letting her run the tea stall - usually the prerogative of the vicar's wife. When the prize draw is announced, it would somehow seem that Flora has indeed won a prize, thanks to a little crafty manipulation, but the ticket has gone missing, and Flora must rely on Cissie to recover it.
| 8 | "The Operation" | Graeme Muir | 24 July 1978 |
Flora feels unwell, but, being banned from the surgery, sends Cissie to describe the symptoms, and learns that she has a grumbling appendix. Admitted to hospital for an operation, she annoys everybody on her ward, but when Cissie takes a call from the hospital, it would supposedly seem that Flora is no more. *Note: This episode marks the final appearance of Katie (Peggy Ledger).

=== Series 3 (1979) ===
| No. | Title | Directed by | Original release date |
|---|---|---|---|
| 1 | "And Cissie Makes Three" | Graeme Muir | 31 May 1979 |
On St George's Day, patriotic Flora is not happy when Miss Milton's German uncle-in-law Klaus (guest star Patrick Newell) comes to stay. However, she changes her tune when he tells her that he finds her very attractive, and eventually proposes marriage to her. Unfortunately, there is an obstacle in their path - Cissie. Klaus thoroughly dislikes her, and Flora is forced to choose between her friend and a new life in Germany.
| 2 | "The Desperate Hours" | Graeme Muir | 7 June 1979 |
Having robbed the post office when Cissie was in it, Fingers and his brother Junior (guest stars Victor Maddern and Christopher Mitchell) hide out at the retirement home, taking the residents captive. Flora is able to drug and disarm the gun-toting Fingers, but Cissie makes a deal with Junior, allowing the pair to escape - though the ladies are left with the loot.
| 3 | "Who's Calling?" | Graeme Muir | 14 June 1979 |
Cissie picks up the office phone and finds herself talking to an obscene caller, which in her innocence, she enjoys. An outraged Flora demands action to trap the offender, and persuades a reluctant Roger to make a similar call, so that Miss Milton will take action. In the event, somebody else beats him to it, spelling misfortune for the vicar.
| 4 | "Use of Bath" | Graeme Muir | 21 June 1979 |
After yet another disagreement with Miss Milton over another resident, Flora moves out, taking the loyal Cissie with her. However, their new abode is a squalid affair, with a greedy, miserly landlord (guest star Norman Mitchell). Dolly and Mildred are appalled when they come to visit. It is hoped that they can persuade Miss Milton to allow Flora and Cissie back again.
| 5 | "Jobs for the Girls" | Graeme Muir | 28 June 1979 |
The ladies decide to earn some extra money through outwork, and go to the job centre, where Cissie ticks a box indicating that they will be addressing envelopes. Therefore, they are surprised to find five thousand models of Native Americans, which they are expected to paint. The work done, they return to the job centre for their pay, but an unwelcome surprise awaits them. Note: A scene from this episode has been censored for future reruns.
| 6 | "Cissie's Last Chance" | Graeme Muir | 5 July 1979 |
When Flora goes to church, she is appalled to hear the vicar announce that Cissie is to marry Horrace Maddox (guest star Frank Williams), the local librarian. On being questioned, Cissie learns that she accidentally said yes to his proposal. To get her friend off the hook, Flora visits a marriage bureau to get Horrace another wife, but when she succeeds, Cissie is suddenly envious.
| 7 | "The Outing" | Graeme Muir | 12 July 1979 |
The ladies go on a day trip to Scarborough, where Flora had a wonderful honeymoon - in the room next to her husband. When the coach driver goes off for the afternoon, leaving the lunch hamper locked in the vehicle, Flora and Cissie break in and get themselves arrested. Only at the police station does Cissie remember that she has the keys.

=== Christmas specials (1979–1980) ===
| No. | Title | Directed by | Original release date |
|---|---|---|---|
| 1 | "Christmas at Paradise Lodge" | Graeme Muir | 24 December 1979 |
It's Christmas 1979, and Flora has trouble organising the others with the carol-singing. Cissie has a mishap with super-glue whilst mending the nativity crib. Next day, the Christmas tree lights blow, and the carol concert is a disaster, but at least Cissie gets the presents she wants - an Action Man she names Beryl, and three camping stoves - which come in handy when the oven blows a fuse.
| 2 | "Twas the Night Before Christmas" | Graeme Muir | 23 December 1980 |
It's Christmas 1980, and Cissie gets her wish to dress up as Santa Claus and dish out the presents, and goes to bed in costume. However, a burglar (guest star Glynn Edwards) breaks into the home, also dressed as Santa, and Cissie mistakes him for the real thing. Somehow, their sacks get mixed up, and the ladies end up with some very valuable gifts. Note: Glynn Edwards previously guest starred as the police sergeant in "The Outing".

=== Series 4 (1981) ===
| No. | Title | Directed by | Original release date |
|---|---|---|---|
| 1 | "Breakfast at Peabody's" | Graeme Muir | 23 June 1981 |
Flora is desperate to get the fur coat offered in Peabody's sale, so she and Cissie hide in the store overnight, keeping one step ahead of the cleaners and the ancient security guards (guest stars Deddie Davies, Valerie Minifie and Harold Goodwin). Eventually, they fall asleep in the bedding department, but for Flora, the next day there is a rude awakening, in more than one respect. Note: Harold Goodwin would later appear as Wilfred in Ashton and Valentine's later sitcom That's My Boy.
| 2 | "Flora's Big Mistake" | Graeme Muir | 30 June 1981 |
Accompanying Cissie to the doctor's surgery, Flora overhears the doctor (guest star Davyd Harris) discuss a terminally ill patient, and assumes it is Cissie. Thus she runs herself ragged ensuring her friend's last days are as comfortable as possible, roping in the others at the home. When she learns the truth, Flora is not happy - especially as Cissie knew the truth all along and was enjoying the attention.
| 3 | "The Missing Ring" | Graeme Muir | 7 July 1981 |
When Mildred puts her sewing machine into an auction, Flora realises her engagement ring is inside it, but is outbid by an obnoxious Irishman (guest star Patrick Durkin). When they meet him in the pub, they take advantage of his attraction to Cissie to get him drunk and reveal its whereabouts - leading to a local junk shop, owned by the shopkeeper (guest star Pamela Cundell), where the ring is recovered. However, Flora has an accident with a vase.
| 4 | "Desirable Residence" | Graeme Muir | 14 July 1981 |
Miss Milton is planning to sell Paradise Lodge so that she can emigrate to Australia and wed her pen-pal, sheep farmer Barry Snatch. An appalled Flora finds out, and martials the other ladies into putting off prospective buyers (guest stars Anthony Howard, Brenda Cowling and Shirley Dixon): however, ultimately, they have Barry himself (guest star Tim Stern) to thank for preventing the sale.
| 5 | "The Gypsy's Curse" | Graeme Muir | 21 July 1981 |
When gypsy Maddalena (guest star Gretchen Franklin) comes to Paradise Lodge to tell fortunes, Flora is scornful and dismissive, resulting in Maddalena putting a curse on her. Soon all the gypsy's prophesies start to come true, with Flora's friends suggesting she make an apology. Since humility is not in Flora's nature, a compromise has to be reached.
| 6 | "Thanks for the Memory" | Graeme Muir | 4 August 1981 |
After arguing with everybody and storming out, Flora returns some six hours later with a bandaged head: claiming to have had an accident and lost her memory, she is uncharacteristically sweet-natured. Whilst Mildred believes she is faking it, and Cissie takes advantage of the situation to get her own back, Miss Milton's idea to jog Flora's memory finally does the trick.
| 7 | "The Home Perm" | Graeme Muir | 11 August 1981 |
Flora wants to impress Mr Petty's niece and nephew (guest stars Pamela Manson and Peter Hughes), who are visiting the next day, with a glamorous perm, but all the hair salons are conveniently booked up. When Flora learns that Cissie has a home perm kit, it seems to be the solution. Unfortunately, the result is a disaster, but Flora and her friends know how to improvise.

== DVD release ==
Network released each series individually; a complete four-disc set was released on 5 February 2018.

| DVD | Release date |
|---|---|
| The Complete Series 1 | 30 August 2010 |
| The Complete Series 2 | 24 January 2011 |
| The Complete Series 3 | 7 March 2011 |
| The Complete Series 4 | 18 April 2011 |
| The Complete Series 1 to 4 | 5 February 2018 |
