= The Silent Playground =

1963 British film by Stanley Goulder

- Directed by: Stanley Goulder
- Written by: Stanley Goulder
- Produced by: George Mills
- Starring: Roland Curram; Bernard Archard; Jean Anderson; Ellen McIntosh
- Cinematography: Martin Curtis
- Edited by: Peter Musgrave
- Music by: Tristram Cary
- Production company: Focus Film Productions
- Distributed by: British Lion (UK)
- Release date: 31 December 1963 (UK)
- Running time: 75 minutes
- Country: United Kingdom
- Language: English

The Silent Playground is a 1963 British thriller film written and directed by Stanley Goulder and starring Bernard Archard, Jean Anderson and Roland Curram.

== Plot ==
In Greenwich, London, just before Christmas, Mavis Nugent, a young widow, drops her children outside the cinema for Saturday morning pictures so that she can go to work at a local haberdashers. A man approaches the cinema queue and gives out handfuls of what the children take to be sweets. At the end of the film showing the cinema staff find several of the children unconscious with barbiturate poisoning. A police investigation begins, led by Inspector Duffy. After one of the children blacks out in the street, a friend of his shows the police two types of capsules. At the hospital Dr Green and the nurses fight to save the children.

After his mother realises that her adult son does not have all of the mental health medication that had been dispensed to him that morning, the hunt shifts to a nervous and vulnerable hospital outpatient, Simon Lacey, who has been unwittingly handing out the pills. The police are able to apprehend him, but not before he has thrown away the rest of the drugs in a playground where children are playing. Meanwhile police search for Mrs Nugent and her three children.

== Cast ==
- Bernard Archard as Inspector Duffy
- Jean Anderson as Mrs. Lacey
- Roland Curram as Simon Lacey
- Ellen McIntosh as Mavis Nugent
- John Ronane as Alan
- Desmond Llewelyn as Dr. Green
- Rowena Gregory as Jane Wilson
- Basil Beale as Sergeant Clark
- Cheryl Molineaux as Ruby
- Michael Byrne as Roger
- Malya Nappi as Mrs. Rosati
- Margaret Flint as Mrs. Fairgrove (as Maggie Flint)
- Mollie Maureen as Mrs. McCarthy
- Gretchen Franklin as Mrs. Elgin
- Barbara Miller as Mrs. Heatherley
- Christine Ozanne as Mrs. Briggs
- Anna Turner as Mrs. Ward
- Bernadette McFadden as Doreen
- Mary McFadden as Angela
- David Walters as David
- Rickford Harris as Johnny
- Aileen Harte as Mrs. Nesbitt
- Donald Tandy as hospital porter
- Anthony Marshall as infirmary child
- Margaret Durnell as Matron
- Victor Charrington as Sgt. in sub-station
- J. Mark Roberts as P.C. in sub-station
- Peter Wells as Ted
- Joe Wadham as Duffy's driver
- Edward Dentith as cinema manager

== Production ==
The film was shot on location in 24 days for $75,000 by debut feature director Goulder, who had previously made documentaries. Some views of Charlton Athletic's football stadium, The Valley (stadium), are seen.

== Reception ==
It was a commercial disappointment.

The Monthly Film Bulletin wrote: "Presumably intended as another warning to children not "to take sweets from a stranger", the film rams the message home by making several of the victims die, but does it in the manner of a conventional soap opera. The main weakness is in the character of Lacey (very badly played by the actor as a drooling stage idiot) who is later turned into an entirely melodramatic figure by means of shock cuts and glowering close-ups. The rest of the playing is fairly standard repertory, but the location shooting in streets, woods and docks is quite lively."

Variety wrote: "Brought in in 24 days at a modest $75,000, with entire location shooting and a little known cast, this is one of British Lion's frequent recent attempts to prove that the dualler can be top level product in entertainment and technical content. This exciting little drama amply proves the distributors' point. It is a quality production which scores heavily against some of its loftier rivals. Writer-director Stanley Boulder has had documentary experience but this is his first essay in feature work. His screenplay is taut, economic and natural in dialog and his direction is unfussy and alert. Technically he has smart aid, with crisp cutting, an evocative unobtrusive score by Tristram Carey and fine lensing by Martin Curtis which not only captures the atmosphere of the London suburb in which the pic was shot but produces some really attractive, bleak photography in river and snow sequences."

TV Guide wrote that "The story never panders to its more sensational elements but is, instead, an intelligent and sensitive thriller".
