= 48 Hours to Live =

1959 film starring Anthony Steel

- Directed by: Peter Bourne
- Written by: Peter Bourne
- Produced by: Edward Rubin executive Sven Nicou
- Starring: Anthony Steel
- Production company: Freja Film
- Release dates: 1959 (Sweden); December 1961 (U.S.)
- Running time: 77 mins
- Countries: Sweden; United Kingdom
- Language: English

48 Hours to Live is a 1959 film starring Anthony Steel.

It was known as Man in the Middle and was shot in Sweden. The movie was little seen outside Sweden.

== Premise ==
A New York reporter, Mike Gibson, is sent to a Swedish island, Gotland, to interview a nuclear scientist. He discovers that foreign agents have kidnapped the scientist and his daughter.

== Cast ==
- Anthony Steel as Mike Gibson
- Birger Malmsten as Paul Forsman
- Lewis Charles as Tony Marino
- Håkan Westergren as Christenson
- Ina Anders as Annika
- Peter Bourne as Charlie Carlson
- Ingemar Johansson

== Production ==
Filming started June 1959.

== Reception ==
The Monthly Film Bulletin said "a fair amount of work in Swedish outdoor settings and a repetitive but catchy theme tune provide this ingenious comedy thriller with two tiny virtues. Otherwise the heavy handled rough stuff is funnier than the light relief; both the characterisation and the acting leave much to be desired; and – a novel departure for a film made in Sweden – the pursuit of a spy ring leads through a nudist camp inhabited, it seems, but not a single nudist."
