= Funny Money (1983 film) =

1983 British film by James Kenelm Clarke

- Directed by: James Kenelm Clarke
- Written by: James Kenelm Clarke
- Produced by: Selwyn Roberts; Greg Smith
- Starring: Gregg Henry; Elizabeth Daily; Derren Nesbitt
- Cinematography: Carolyn Brandt; Ray Dennis Steckler; John Wyatt
- Edited by: Bill Lenny
- Production company: Norfolk International Pictures
- Distributed by: Cannon Film Distributors
- Release date: August 1983
- Running time: 97 minutes
- Country: United Kingdom
- Language: English

Funny Money is a 1983 British crime film directed by James Kenelm Clarke and starring Gregg Henry, Elizabeth Daily and Derren Nesbitt. The Film was distributed by Cannon Films. The film's sets were designed by the art director Harry Pottle.

== Plot ==
A pair of credit card thieves flee Las Vegas for London where they shelter in the Londonderry Hotel.

== Cast ==
- Gregg Henry as Ben Turtle
- Elizabeth Daily as Cass
- Gareth Hunt as Keith Banks
- Derren Nesbitt as Jake Sanderson
- Annie Ross as Diana Sharman
- Joe Praml as Limping Man
- Rose Alba as Mrs. de Salle
- Stephen Yardley as Ridley
- Nigel Lambert as Vernon Birtwhistle
- Bill Mitchell as Gordeno
- Lyndam Gregory as Ashed
- Al Matthews as 1st Hood
- Carol Cleveland as Delphine
- Mildred Shay as Mrs. Keller
- Charles Keating as Ferguson
- Robert Henderson as Mr. Keller
- Alan Campbell as Barty Nichols
- Rai Bartonious as Gatzzi
- Fred S. Ronnow as Hoods' Chauffeur
- Johnnie Wade as Venables
- Ronald Chenery as Waiter
