= James Kenelm Clarke =

English film director and composer (1941–2020)

James Kenelm Clarke (5 February 1941 – 29 July 2020) was an English film director and composer of film, television and library music.

== Early life and education ==
James Kenelm Clarke was born in Great Rissington, Gloucestershire, the son of musician and author Cyril Clarke and the artist Eularia Clarke on 5 February 1941. With Harley Usill, Cyril Clarke established Argo Records in 1951. James Clarke was educated at Leighton Park School in Reading and from 1959 travelled to Paris, where he studied music with René Leibowitz.

== Film and television ==
At the age of 18 he wrote the music for Michael Darlow's film All These People and then many scores for Anglia Television's plays (under George More O'Ferrall) and then at the suggestion of Sir John Woolf joined Anglia Television full-time in 1961 as a researcher on Anglia's local programme About Anglia. In 1967, he joined BBC Television in London as a producer on the award-winning programme Man Alive, edited by Desmond Wilcox. Clarke produced film segments for reporters Esther Rantzen, John Pitman, Joan Bakewell and James Astor. He also contributed films - and the title theme music - to Braden's Week and worked with the That's Life! team.

He directed and co-produced the feature film Got It Made (1974) starring Lalla Ward, before setting up Norfolk International Pictures Limited in London. Norfolk International made the following feature films for the international market: Exposé (1976), Hardcore (1977), Let's Get Laid (1978), The Thirty Nine Steps (1978), The Music Machine (1979, described as the first all-British disco film), Paul Raymond's Erotica (1981) and Funny Money (1983). His last known film was Going Undercover (1988), aka, Yellow Pages (completed 1985), which went straight to video in the United Kingdom.

== Music ==
Clarke first began to compose library music for De Wolfe in the 1950s, while also providing scores for Anglia Television plays, through Associated Rediffusion. In 1967 he met head of KPM Music Robin Phillips and began composing music for the KPM 1000 Series. Six original pieces came out of the first sessions at the Ariola Studies in June 1967: Think Big (closing), Summer Thoughts, Autumn Thoughts, Winter Thoughts, Far Away Thinking and Spring Bossa. Further compositions were included on KPM 1028, Miniature Moods (1968), KPM 1036, Gentle Sounds (1968), KPM 1039, Light Intimations, Volume 3 (1968), and KPM 1060, Open Air (1970).

In 1969, an original album, entitled Girl on the Beach, was issued for broader commercial release on the Aristocrat label, distributed by Pye Records. Produced by Robin Phillips and recorded by Adrian Kerridge, the style has been compared to the richly scored orchestral miniatures of Henry Mancini. The pianist was Steve Gray, who played on most of Clarke's sessions from then on.

Clarke was CEO of Norfolk Music Publishing Ltd.

== Death ==
Clarke died in Westwick, Norfolk on 29 July 2020 at the age of 79.

== Selected filmography ==
- Got It Made (1974) – director, writer
- Exposé (1976) – director, writer
- Hardcore (1977) – director, co-writer
- Let's Get Laid (1978) – director
- The Thirty Nine Steps (1978) – executive producer
- The Music Machine (1979) – writer
- Paul Raymond's Erotica (1981) – producer
- Funny Money (1983) – director, writer
- Going Undercover (1988, straight to video in the UK as Yellow Pages) – director
- Stalker (2010) – executive producer

== Selected discography ==
- A Light Jazz Feeling, KPM 1021 (1967)
- Miniature Moods, KPM 1028 (1968)
- Gentle Sounds, KPM 1036 (1968)
- Light Intimations, Volume 3, KPM 1039 (1968)
- A Man of Our Times, Fontana SFJL 966 (1968)
- Girl on the Beach, AR 1020 (1969)
- Open Air, KPM 1060 (1970)
- Music Pictorial, KPM 1096 (1971)
- Open Air, Volume 2, KPM 1099 (1972)
- The Trendsetters, KPM 1131 (1973)
- Suspended Woodwind, KPM 1143 (1974)
- Orchestral Contrasts, KPM 1179 (1976)
- Mystery Movie, TIM 1015 (1976)
- Tender Emotions, KPM 1180 (1976)
