= John Telfer =

John Stanley Telfer (2 March 1873 – 10 October 1938) was a British auctioneer and philatelist who was added to the Roll of Distinguished Philatelists retrospectively in 1951.

Telfer was a partner, with Frank Hadlow, in the philatelic auctioneers Plumridge & Co.
