= Mervyn Cowie =

Pioneer conservationist in Kenya

- Born: 13 April 1909
- Died: 19 July 1996 (aged 87); Ipswich Hospital, England
- Education: University of Oxford
- Known for: conservationist

Mervyn Hugh Cowie, CBE, ED, FCA (13 April 1909 – 19 July 1996) was a conservationist who pioneered wildlife protection and the development of tourism throughout East Africa.

== Early life ==
Cowie was a descendant of Scottish farmers who migrated to South Africa. Cowie's father resigned as Chief Magistrate of Johannesburg, South Africa to settle in Kenya. Cowie was born in Nairobi on 13 April 1909. He grew up in a thatched mud hut 30 miles from Nairobi. He had one brother. He was first educated in Nairobi, then moved to England to study at Brighton College and the University of Oxford. He qualified as a chartered accountant and returned to Kenya in 1932.

== Career ==
On his return to Kenya in 1932, Cowie was alarmed how the number of game animals had depleted during his nine-year absence. The complete lack of government policies on conservation was the principal cause of this depletion. Cowie was concerned about human pressure on wilderness areas. He thought that there should be special areas where wild animals could exist without interference from people. He realised that only tourism could generate the revenues needed to establish the infrastructure, including parks, needed to protect animals. He envisioned a series of national parks and an efficiently run system for the preservation of game. However, the governments of the British colonial territories opposed the establishment of national parks.

Between 1932 and 1939 Cowie was a district councillor in Nairobi. He also campaigned tirelessly for the protection of wildlife. He was frustrated by the government's lack of action on this issue, so he used the ploy of anonymously advocating the destruction of all East Africa's wildlife to improve agriculture. Playing devil's advocate to push public opinion against hunting, he wrote a letter to the East African Standard signed "Old Settler" which proposed the slaughter of all of Kenya's wild animals. There was public outcry against this suggestion, and the government was forced to act, and formed a committee to examine the matter. A national parks board was eventually established with Cowie as its chairman. Nairobi National Park, Kenya's first national park, was opened in 1946, with Cowie as its executive director. He opened a series of parks throughout East Africa, and assisted and advised on the formation of parks in Tanganyika and Uganda. Serengeti National Park in Tanganyika was gazetted in 1951. Queen Elizabeth National Park and Murchison Falls National Park were established in Uganda in 1952. He was a hands-on administrator, and learned how to fly an aircraft so that he could patrol the parks he was responsible for. His aircraft was once chased by a rhinoceros when he attempted to land at a park outpost.

Cowie sat on the Kenya Legislative Council for ten years. He was Director of Manpower during the 1953 Mau Mau Uprising. He organised and managed extensive anti-poaching operations, and was the founder of Royal National Parks of Kenya and director of Royal National Parks of Kenya from 1946 to 1966. He was vice-president of the East African Tourist Travel Association from 1950 to 1965 and served as the East African representative for the Alliance Internationale de Tourisme. In the 1950s he also presented a series of BBC television natural history programmes. He became a Commander of the Order of the British Empire (CBE) in 1960. He resigned from the Royal National Parks of Kenya in 1966. By 1970 he was a Senior Consultant to the World Wildlife Fund. In 1972 he joined the African Medical and Research Foundation in Nairobi as financial director.

Cowie also served in Kenya's armed forces. He joined the King's African Rifles reserve in the 1930s, and at the outbreak of the Second World War in 1939 he was commissioned into the Kenya Regiment, and served in Abyssinia, Madagascar, and the Middle East, rising to the rank of lieutenant-colonel. In 1954 he was awarded the Efficiency Decoration for long part-time military service.

Cowie wrote the books Fly Vulture (1961), I Walk with Lions (1964), and African Lion (1965). The 1951 British-made film Where No Vultures Fly (renamed Ivory Hunter in the United States) was a fictionalised account of Cowie's work.

Cowie married Molly Beaty in 1934. They had two sons and one daughter. Beaty died in 1956. He married Valori Hare Duke in 1957. They had one son and one daughter. He retired to England in 1989, and settled near Saxmundham, Suffolk. He died from a heart attack aged 87 on 19 July 1996, at Ipswich Hospital.
