= Fiona Richmond =

English former glamour model and actress (born 1945)

- Born: Julia Rosamund Harrison; 2 March 1945 (age 81); Hilborough, Norfolk, England
- Other names: Amber St. George; Amber Harrison
- Occupations: Glamour model; actress
- Spouse: James Montgomery (1983–1998)
- Partner: Paul Raymond (1970–1977)

Fiona Richmond (born 2 March 1945) is an English former glamour model and actress who appeared in numerous risqué plays, comedy revues, magazines and films during the 1970s. She became Britain’s best-known sex symbol and she has been described as one of the "two hottest British sex film stars of the seventies", the other being Mary Millington.

== Early life ==
Richmond is the daughter of a vicar. She was born Julia Harrison in a rectory in Hilborough, Norfolk. At school she qualified for university but chose to audition for drama schools with the aim of becoming an actress. She initially worked as an air stewardess, then as a nanny for the actress Diane Cilento, and subsequently as a Playboy Club croupier.

== Acting career ==
Richmond met the British strip-club owner and publisher Paul Raymond in 1970 when she auditioned for a part in the nude farce Pyjama Tops at the Whitehall Theatre in London. She was awarded the part and went on to star at the Raymond Revuebar strip club, appear in nude photo shoots and work as an adult entertainment journalist, writing articles about sex for the UK’s top shelf magazines. In 1970 she was the subject of a TV documentary The Actress Said. Her column in Raymond's Men Only magazine, in which she described her supposed sexual adventures with men and women around the world, brought her some fame. In 1974 she appeared as a regular sex adviser on the London Broadcasting Company, a British talk radio and phone-in station. In the same year she made the TV documentary What the Actress said to the Bishop which won a gold award at the Atlanta International Film Festival. In 1976 the News of the World printed a picture of Richmond in the Crystal Palace F.C. players' bath with Crystal Palace's manager Malcolm Allison, as a result of which Allison was charged with bringing the game into disrepute by The Football Association.

She made her film debut (billed under the name Amber Harrison) in Not Tonight, Darling (1971), and made an uncredited appearance as a stripper in Barry McKenzie Holds His Own (1974) which led to larger roles in X-rated movies such as the psychological thriller Exposé (1976). Others included Hardcore (1977) – also titled Frankly Fiona – a sex comedy in which she played herself, partially based on an autobiography she had written, and Let's Get Laid (1977), a mistaken-identity comedy that had no connection to the stage show of the same name. She also appeared in Raymond's Electric Blue video series, hosting the first of them in 1979. Her later roles included the Queen of France in the Mel Brooks comedy History of the World, Part I (1981), Mrs French in a 1983 episode of the TV comedy series The Comic Strip Presents... called Five Go Mad on Mescalin, and Fiona the KGB agent in the all-star black comedy Eat The Rich (1987). She also recorded the spoken word album Frankly Fiona in 1973, in collaboration with Anthony Newley, adding erotic talk to Newley's songs.

Richmond appeared in many of Paul Raymond's stage shows. From 1970 until 1974 she starred as a nude swimmer in Pyjama Tops, the West End's first nude production, which ran at the Whitehall Theatre for five years from 1969. The play, set around a transparent-sided swimming pool into which nude actresses periodically plunged, was an English version of the French farce Moumou. Richmond also starred in the play's 1972 tour. In 1974 she appeared on stage at the Windmill Theatre with John Inman in Let's Get Laid, a sex sketch comedy written by Victor Spinetti. The play was the first to be performed in the newly re-opened theatre, and to promote it she rode a horse through Piccadilly Circus in the style of Lady Godiva. In 1977 she starred opposite Divine in the women's prison comedy Women Behind Bars at the Whitehall Theatre. In 1979 she went on tour as the star of Yes, We Have No Pyjamas, another of Raymond's nude productions. She starred in the 1980-81 Paul Raymond production of Wot! No Pyjamas! at the Whitehall Theatre and its subsequent tour. Semi-naked photos of Richmond appeared on posters outside the Whitehall Theatre, and the Greater London Council took legal action against them. In 1982 she starred in the nude stage farce Space in My Pyjamas which toured the provinces for over 15 weeks. In a TV interview promoting the tour she expressed her intention to give up nude shows in favour of more serious acting.

Richmond has published many fictional and autobiographical books based on her sexual experiences, including Fiona (1976), Story of I (1978), On the Road by Fiona (1979), Galactic Girl (1980), Remember Paris (1980), The Good, the Bad and the Beautiful (1980), From Here to Virginity (1981), In Depth (1982) and Tell Tale Tits (1987). She also appeared as a celebrity in TV quiz shows. Her last showbusiness appearances were in the 1990s, including guest spots on James Randi: Psychic Investigator (1991), The Truth About Women (1992), and as an uncredited extra in The Man Who Made Husbands Jealous (1997).

== Personal life ==
By the time Paul Raymond met Fiona Richmond he was already separated from his wife Jean. Richmond became his girlfriend and the pair were a celebrity couple from 1970 until 1977, living together in London in a flat in Portman Square. Raymond admitted adultery with Richmond, and his wife divorced him in 1974 after 23 years of marriage, receiving a £250,000 settlement. He gave Richmond a yellow Jaguar E-Type sports car with the personalised number plate FU2, and she became recognised driving it around the West End. Despite his wealth she continued to work, as she valued her independence. Following Raymond's death on 2 March 2008, Richmond gave an interview to the Daily Mirror about him:

We had fabulous times touring the world looking for acts for the Raymond Revue bar[sic] ... [Paul Raymond] had a boat on the south of France called Veste Demitte. The closest translation from the Latin is "Get ‘Em Off...." He was one of the last great showmen. Everyone today is just so much more boring.

Having become exhausted by the show business lifestyle she left Raymond, though they remained friends. In 1978 she expressed her intention to marry James Montgomery, the presenter of Southern Television's regional news programme Day by Day. Richmond had met Montgomery when she appeared on a TV show he was producing to promote a book she had written. The pair were married in 1983 and had one daughter, Tara, born when Richmond was 39. In that year Richmond retired from show business, going on to run a fashion company and work as a journalist. The couple were divorced in 1998 but she retained her married name of Julia Montgomery.

Richmond subsequently became a hotelier with her partner, former pig farmer Peter Pilbrow. By 2001 they owned and ran two establishments: "Petit Bacaye Cottage Hotel" on the Caribbean island of Grenada, and "The Onion Store", an English bed and breakfast house in Hampshire, the latter appearing in a number of BBC TV holiday programmes. She went on to spend time in both countries and raise funds for the charity Gift Grenada.

Richmond gave an interview after the release of the 2013 Paul Raymond biopic The Look of Love directed by Michael Winterbottom in which she was played by Tamsin Egerton. She talked positively about the magazine modelling work she did in the 1970s, saying:

"I didn’t have any problems taking my top off. There is nothing wrong with the naked female form and my photo shoots for Men Only were always pretty. Nowadays they are more suitable for trainee gynaecologists."

However, she was critical of the film saying that it portrayed a sleazy side of her life that never happened, and that most of the script changes she had suggested to make the film more accurate had not been taken up.

== Filmography ==
Year	Title	Role	Notes
1971	Not Tonight, Darling	Suzanne	
1974	Barry McKenzie Holds His Own	French Stripper	
1976	Exposé	Suzanne	
1977	Hardcore	Fiona	
1977	Let's Get Laid	Maxine Lupercal	
1981	History of the World, Part I	Queen	(The French Revolution)
1987	Eat The Rich	Fiona	
1992	The Truth About Women		
1997	The Man Who Made Husbands Jealous	extra	TV series, 3 episodes Uncredited

== Bibliography ==
Year	Title	Publisher	ISBN	Pages	Notes
1977	Fiona	Star Books (imprint of W.H. Allen)	978-0-352-39877-2	208	First edition by Fiona Press Inc. / Club Paperback 1976
1978	Story of I	Star Books	978-0-352-30520-6	208	
1979	On the Road	Star Books	978-0-426-18809-4	204	
1980	Galactic Girl	Star Books	978-0-352-30748-4	140	
1980	The Good, the Bad and the Beautiful	Star Books	978-0-352-30556-5	157	
1981	From Here to Virginity	Star Books	978-0-352-30964-8	145	
1982	In Depth	Arrow Books	978-0-099-29880-9	190	
1987	Tell Tale Tits: Her Revealing Autobiography	Cassell Illustrated	978-0-713-71896-6	192	

== See also ==
- Nudity in film
- Nudity in live performance
