= Exposé (film) =

1976 British thriller film by James Kenelm Clarke

- Directed by: James Kenelm Clarke
- Written by: James Kenelm Clarke
- Produced by: Brian Smedley-Aston
- Starring: Udo Kier; Linda Hayden; Fiona Richmond
- Cinematography: Dennis C. Lewiston
- Edited by: Jim Connock
- Music by: Steve Gray
- Distributed by: Target (UK)
- Release date: March 1976 (UK)
- Running time: 82 minutes (cut version); 84 minutes (uncut version)
- Country: United Kingdom
- Language: English

Exposé (also known as House on Straw Hill and Trauma) is a 1976 British psychological horror thriller film that was referred to as a video nasty during the 1980s. It was directed by James Kenelm Clarke, partly financed by Paul Raymond and stars Udo Kier, Linda Hayden and 1970s sex symbol Fiona Richmond.

== Plot ==
Paul Martin is a novelist who rents out a secluded cottage in the British countryside to complete his new book, a pretentious sex romp. Plagued by recurring paranoid nightmares, he has split with his girlfriend, Suzanne, and is having problems writing his book. Paul employs a secretary, Linda Hindstatt, to type the manuscript for him. Paul meets Linda at the railway station, where Linda is intimidated by a couple of youths, prompting Paul to give them a battering. After settling into the house, Linda takes a walk in a field where the men rape her, but soon gets revenge when she shoots them both with a shotgun.

Meanwhile, Paul keeps having nightmares, and all his advances on Linda are rejected. Linda insinuates herself into the household, displacing the housekeeper, Mrs. Aston. When a suspicious Mrs. Aston returns to the house at night, she is murdered: her throat slashed with a knife. As Paul and Linda work on completing the novel, he asks Suzanne to come back, only for Linda to seduce her. As Linda and Suzanne have sex, Paul then crashes his car into a river, the brakes having been tampered with (assumed) by Linda. Suzanne is murdered in the shower by Linda, and everything erupts into a pandemonium of violence.

== Cast ==
- Udo Kier as Paul Martin
- Linda Hayden as Linda Hindstatt
- Fiona Richmond as Suzanne
- Patsy Smart as Mrs. Aston
- Karl Howman as Big Youth
- Vic Armstrong as Small Youth

== Production ==
In a documentary on the DVD of The Blood on Satan's Claw (1971) Hayden says that this is the only movie she regrets making and was not the film she had made originally.

Kier revealed his own antipathy for the film in a 2014 interview with Empire, bemoaning the fact that his voice was dubbed and that he was never paid. He also dismissed Richmond as a credible actress, saying "The other girl, Linda Hayden, she was a real actress. Fiona Richmond was just a famous person trying to be naked in a movie."

=== Filming ===
The house being used for the film was, at the time, being rented by the director, James Kenelm Clarke. The house is situated on Spring Elms Lane, Little Baddow, Essex and is a private residence. The rape scene and the final scene were filmed in the wheatfield adjoining the back garden. Other locations used around Little Baddow were Mowden Hall Lane and its junction with North Hill, the bridge on Church Road as it crosses the River Chelmer, and the ford in Hurrells Lane. The station scenes were filmed at Hatfield Peverel Railway Station.

=== Music ===
Pianist, composer and arranger Steve Gray had already worked with director (and musician) James Clarke, who asked him to score the film. It was recorded at KPM's basement studios at 21 Denmark Street, using the unusual combination of four violas, percussion, piano and synthesizer.

== Release ==
=== Censorship ===
The film was originally released straight to theaters in March 1976 and it received a heavy amount of cuts due to its graphic violent and sexual content. On its original cinematic release over three minutes were cut to allow it an X certificate. An uncut video version was banned in the UK following the passing of the Video Recordings Act 1984. Both the 1997 UK video and subsequent DVD re-releases contain significant edits.

=== Edits ===
- Udo Kier was dubbed.
- The current 18-rated UK DVD version has around 51 secs of cuts, with edits to the rape scene, some of Suzanne's death, and the shot of her dead in the shower.
- In 2013, Severin Films released a Blu-ray and DVD double-disc set of Exposé under the title, House on Straw Hill. In the preamble on the disc, Severin state that this version was created using the original negative and two prints of the film to give it its uncut form. The quoted running time is 84 minutes.

== Reception ==
The Monthly Film Bulletin wrote: "Due in part to the fact that the film was shot entirely on location, and to the high standard of lighting, camerawork and editing, Exposé holds the viewer's interest long after the patent inadequacies of the performances and dialogue have dissipated any concern for the characters or their behaviour. Kier is totally unbelievable as an English writer (because of the prose he dictates and the accent in which he dictates it) and, trendily dressed by Tommy Nutter, sulks about rather like a poor man's Helmut Berger. Linda Hayden pouts evilly even while remaining innocently wide-eyed, and Fiona Richmond removes her clothes with consummate professionalism. Clarke's shortcomings as a director of actors and as a scriptwriter are sharply contradicted, however, by his control of the images. The exposition is advanced by three neatly constructed montages which provide simple but intriguing clues to the narrative ... The film thus adds up to a reasonably intriguing thriller – with some titillating sexual content – rather than sexploitation with violence, and seems unlikely to find its audience in most soft-core halls. Its visual qualities may superficially be those of a good commercial, but it remains a promising piece of work, and one hopes that Clarke may be allowed to tackle something mere complex in the future."

== Remake ==
The film was re-made in 2010 as Stalker, directed by Martin Kemp, starring Anna Brecon as writer Paula Martin and Jane March as Linda, and with original star Linda Hayden as "Mrs Brown".
