= The Play on One =

British television drama anthology series

- Also known as: Play on One
- Genre: Drama
- Country of origin: United Kingdom
- Original language: English
- No. of series: 4
- No. of episodes: 30 (list of episodes)

Production
- Production company: BBC

Original release
- Network: BBC1
- Release: 19 January 1988 – 29 August 1991

The Play on One (Play on One in the final series) is a British television drama anthology series, produced by the BBC Nations and Regions in its studios outside London, and transmitted on BBC1 from 19 January 1988 to 29 August 1991.

== Plays ==
Date	Title	Writer	Director	Producer
19 January 1988	Down Where the Buffalo Go	Peter McDougall	Ian Knox	Andy Park
Cast: Harvey Keitel, Andrew Byatt, Stella Gonet, David Lansbury, Katherine Stark, Jenny McCrindle, Hugh Martin, Lesley Jackson, Alex McAvoy, Bill Barclay, Craig Ferguson, Pat Doyle, Ron Donachie and Maggie Bell
26 January 1988	The Dark Room	Julian Gloag	Guy Slater	Norman McCandlish
Cast: Susan Wooldridge, Philip Jackson, Julie Graham, Jacqueline Gilbride, Edith Ruddick, Irene Sunters, Belinda Adye, Terry Cavers, Jean Bruce, Maria McAuley, William Blair, Keith Neill, Ian Briggs, Andrew Celli, Stewart Aitken, Paul Samson, Grace Glover, Katy Hale, Eliza Langland, Bridget McCann, Sheila Greer-Smith and Gordon Kane
2 February 1988	Normal Service	John Byrne	Garth Tucker	Andy Park
Cast: Kenneth Cranham, Richard Wilson, Martin Cochrane, Frederick Warder, Alex McCrindle, Tony Roper, Katy Murphy and Stuart Davids
9 February 1988	The Dunroamin' Rising	Colin MacDonald	Moira Armstrong	Tom Kinninmont
Cast: Russell Hunter, Elizabeth Sellars, Thorley Walters, Hugh Lloyd, Madeleine Christie, Jennifer Piercey, Siobhan Redmond, David Rintoul, Andy Gray, Simon Donald, Irene Sunters and Ida Schuster
16 February 1988	A Wholly Healthy Glasgow	Iain Heggie	Richard Wilson	Bill Bryden
Cast: Tom Watson, Gerard Kelly, Paul Higgins, Adam Crowther and Tony Betts
23 February 1988	Unreported Incident	David Martin	Christopher Baker	Norman McCandlish
Cast: T. P. McKenna, Maurice Roëves, David Calder, Tim Brierley, Marsha Hunt, Nickolas Grace, Kika Mirylees, Emlyn Price, Maggie Ollerenshaw, Grace Glover, Malcolm Kaye, Nigel Lambert, Carl Rigg, Andrew Secombe, Alan Downer, Eric Allan, Bill Caddick and Tara Ward
1 March 1988	Airbase	Malcolm McKay	David Attwood	Roger Gregory
Cast: Anton Lesser, Clive Mantle, Catherine Russell, David Lansbury, Ricco Ross, Stevan Rimkus and Norman Beaton
8 March 1988	The Party	Trevor Griffiths	Sebastian Graham-Jones	Norman McCandlish
Cast: Andrew Keir, Jack Shepherd, Kenneth Cranham, Oliver Cotton, Gawn Grainger, Robert Walker, Bob Mason, Mary Conlon, Kate McKenzie, Vincenzo Ricotta and Siv Borg
21 February 1989	Heartland	Steve Gough	Kevin Billington	Christine Benson
Cast: Anthony Hopkins, Lynn Farleigh, Glyn Houston, Mark Lewis Jones, Martin Glyn Murray, Hugh Fraser, Paul Humpoletz, Jane Horrocks, Gemma Heritage, Mike Hayward, Hubert Rees, David Quilter, Geoffrey Evans, Bill Bellamy and Gareth Morris
28 February 1989	These Foolish Things	Elizabeth Spender	Charles Gormley	Andy Park
Cast: James Fox, Lindsay Duncan, Ciaran Madden, Michael Keating, Anthony Dutton, Tom Knight, Alex Kingston, Nina Cowan, Eva Lohman, Chloe Salaman, Charlotte Attenborough, Michael Howe, Andrew Seear, Katherine Fahy, Frannie Parkes, Michael Fitzgerald, Andrew Barr and Edmund Dehn
7 March 1989	Govan Ghost Story	Bryan Elsley	David Hayman	Aileen Forsyth
Cast: Tom Watson, Fletcher Mathers, Julia Wallace, Denise McDonald, Jim Twaddale, Jackie Farrell, Finlay Welsh, Alex Howden, Mamie Stirling, Stewart Ennis, Chanel Stringfellow, Matthew Costello, Paul Samson, Pat Ross and Subash Singh Pall
14 March 1989	The Shawl	David Mamet	Bill Bryden	Susanna Capon
Cast: Nigel Hawthorne, Brenda Blethyn and Karl Johnson
21 March 1989	A View of Harry Clark	Daniel Boyle	Alastair Reid	Tom Kinninmont
Cast: Griff Rhys Jones, Elaine Paige, Laura Claire Duerden, Benjie Lawrence, Charlotte Coleman, Adrian Murphy, Ian Hart, Jake D'Arcy, Mary Ann Reid, Louis Emerick, James Culshaw, Al T Kossy, Mitzi Meuller, Sandra Gough, Iain McColl, Ian Sexon, Grace Kirby and Jill Balcon
28 March 1989	The Gift	Colin MacDonald	Sandy Johnson	Andy Park
Cast: Duncan MacDonald, David Campbell, Del Henney, Clive Russell, Andrew Barr, Tommy Docherty, Jim Baxter, Pauline Thompson, Aline Mowat, Derek Anders, Bill Riddoch, Maggie McRitchie, Richard Cartledge, John Murtagh, Matthew Costello, Christopher Connor and Alan Tall
4 April 1989	Clowns	Gawn Grainger	David Maloney	Tom Kinninmont
Cast: Harry Andrews, Angela Down, Stephen Moore, Quona Minster, Robbie Engels, Alex Davion, Elizabeth Chambers, Ann Curthoys, Geoffrey Whitehead, Anne Kristen, Michael Keating, Jenny Twigge, Jenny McCrindle, Sam Miller, Christopher Elwell-Sutton, Richard Bell, Daniel Rodgers, Julia Marshall, Penny Sharp, Wendy Bishop and Simon Rodgers
11 April 1989	Biting the Hands	Rona Munro	Carol Wilks	Norman McCandlish
Cast: Judith Sweeney, Louise Beattie, Anne Kristen, Ewan Stewart, Stephanie Fayerman, Andrew Robertson, Tony Roper, Billy McElhanney, Audrey Jenkinson, Hilary MacLean, Douglas Anderson, Kerry Arthur, Marcus Railton, Kenny McFadyen and David Tennant
18 April 1989	A Master of the Marionettes	Guy Hibbert	Pedr James	Michael Wearing
Cast: Kenneth Cranham, Kenneth Colley, Carol Drinkwater, John Duttine, David Bradley, Noel Collins, Lennox Greaves, Sean Chapman, Elaine Donnelly, Peter Hughes, Lloyd McGuire, John Cunningham, Richenda Carey, Peter Yapp, Simon James, Matthew Hutchings, Lydia Hutchings and Alison Gorton
25 April 1989	Unexplained Laughter	Alun Owen from the novel by Alice Thomas Ellis	Gareth Davies	Tom Kinninmont
Cast: Diana Rigg, Elaine Paige, Joanna David, Jon Finch, Robert Gwilym, Cindy Holden, Robert East, Emlyn Price, Howell Evans, Patricia Kane, Moir Leslie, Anna Linstrum and Miriam Margolyes
26 July 1990	Changing Step	Antony Sher	Richard Wilson	Andy Park
Cast: James Convey, Susan Wooldridge, Eleanor Bron, Antony Sher, Sandra Voe, Jason Boyle, Terry Cavers, Helena Gillies, Sheila Donald, Fenella Kerr, Laurence McCann, Ewan Marshall, Ralph Riach, Margaretta Scott, Geof Armstrong, Jim Brogan, Jean Bruce, Brown Derby, Colin Duthie, John Wilson Goddard, Peter Hull, Brian Quinn, Garry Stewart and Dex Warren
2 August 1990	The Wreck on the Highway	Colin MacDonald	Sandy Johnson	Norman McCandlish
Cast: Tam White, Lynn Anderson, Ryan Quinn, C P Grogan, Duncan Duff, William Steel, Rachel Robertson and Angus MacInnes
9 August 1990	Killing Time	Kevin Elyot	David Attwood	Hilary Salmon
Cast: Pip Donaghy, Aidan Gillen, Harold Innocent, Hilda Fenemore, Ivor Roberts, Patrick Cremin, Ian Bailey, Bill McCabe, Chas Bryer, Geoffrey Greenhill, Lewis George and Stephen Morris
16 August 1990	Obituaries	David Conville	David Blair	Aileen Forsyth
Cast: Ian Carmichael, Ronald Fraser and Polly Hemingway
23 August 1990	Separation	Tom Kempinski	Barry Davis	Paddy Higson
Cast: David Suchet and Rosanna Arquette
30 August 1990	Yellowbacks	Malcolm McKay	Roy Battersby	Peter Broughan
Cast: Janet McTeer, Roy Marsden, Bill Paterson, Tim Roth, Imelda Staunton, Kenny Ireland, Ciarán Hinds, Luke Hanson, Linda Henry and Jonathan Phillips
25 July 1991	Misterioso	Alan Plater	John Glenister	Norman McCandlish
Cast: Suzan Sylvester, Jack Shepherd, Hugh Ross, Eilidh Alexander, David Michaels, Paul Stacey, Sharon Duce, Keith Marsh, Margery Mason, Angela Douglas, Gawn Grainger, Angela Morant, Gabrielle Reidy, David Jackson, Valerie Buchanan and Rachel Ogilvy
1 August 1991	Gas and Candles	Jimmy McGovern	Alvin Rakoff	Norman McCandlish
Cast: Edna Doré, Bert Parnaby, Leslie Sands, Simon Oates, Richard Brain, Rod Culbertson, Mark Lewis Jones and Kenneth Bryans
8 August 1991	Escape from Kampala	Wycliffe Kato adapted by Margaret and Eric Leclere	Roy Battersby	Aileen Forsyth
Cast: John Matshikiza, Rudolph Walker, Oke Wambu, John Adewoll, Leo Wringer, Eddie Nestor, Thomas Baptiste, Hepburn Graham, Valentine Nonyela, Tunde Babs, Christian Dixon, Stephen K Amos, Jabu Mbalo, Raymond Johnson, Ilario Bisi-Pedro, Dorothy Brown, Joy Elias-Rilwan, Ian Roberts, Reginald Tsiboe, Chris Gilbert and Troy Fairclough
15 August 1991	And the Cow Jumped over the Moon	Donna Franceschild	Penny Cherns	Aileen Forsyth
Cast: Phyllis Logan, Elaine Collins, Anne Downie, Ida Schuster, Andy Gray, Billy McElhaney and Joseph Charles
22 August 1991	Out of the Blue	Graham Alborough	Nick Hamm	Barry Hanson
Cast: Colin Firth, Catherine Zeta Jones, John Lynch, Cathy Tyson, Dexter Fletcher, Wendy Morgan, Jonathan Kydd, Dominique Atkins, Bill Cashmore, Tina Deen and Daniel Strauss
29 August 1991	Effie's Burning	Valerie Windsor	Nigel Evans	Tom Kinninmont
Cast: Paula Tilbrook, Phyllis Logan and Gordon Jackson
