= The Chill Factor =

The Chill Factor may refer to:

- A Cold Night's Death, a 1973 television horror film, also known as The Chill Factor
- The Chill Factor (1993 film), a 1993 supernatural horror film, also known as Demon Possessed
- "The Chill Factor" (Between the Lines), a 1992 television episode
