= Unman, Wittering and Zigo (film) =

1971 British film by John Mackenzie

- Original theatrical poster
- Directed by: John Mackenzie
- Written by: Simon Raven
- Based on: play by Giles Cooper
- Produced by: Gareth Wigan
- Starring: David Hemmings; Douglas Wilmer; Carolyn Seymour; Hamilton Dyce
- Cinematography: Geoffrey Unsworth
- Edited by: Fergus McDonell
- Music by: Michael J. Lewis
- Production companies: Hemmings; Mediaarts
- Distributed by: Paramount Pictures
- Release dates: 23 September 1971 (UK); 13 June 1971 (NYC)
- Running time: 102 minutes
- Country: United Kingdom
- Language: English

Unman, Wittering and Zigo is a 1971 British thriller film directed by John Mackenzie and starring David Hemmings, Douglas Wilmer and Carolyn Seymour. It was adapted by Simon Raven from Giles Cooper's 1958 BBC Radio 3 radio drama Unman, Wittering and Zigo.

The movie's title was parodied in Little Britain (Series 1 Episode 6, 2003), and by a Rowan Atkinson sketch in the 1979 Secret Policeman's Ball concert for Amnesty International.

== Plot ==
New teacher John Ebony arrives at a school and begins to suspect his predecessor was murdered by the pupils, though his suspicions are written off as paranoia. He sets out to prevent the same fate from befalling him.

== Cast ==
- David Hemmings as John Ebony
- Douglas Wilmer as Headmaster
- Carolyn Seymour as Silvia Ebony
- Hamilton Dyce as Mr. Winstanley
- Anthony Haygarth as Cary Farthingale
- Barbara Lott as Mrs. Winstanley
- Donald Gee as Stretton
- David Jackson as Clackworth
- Hubert Rees as Blisterine
- David Auker as Aggeridge
- Tom Morris as Ankerton
- Richard Gill as Borby
- Michael Kitchen as Bungabine
- Nicholas Hoye as Cloistermouth
- Tom Owen as Cuthbun
- Toby Simpson as Hogg
- James Wardroper as Lipstrob
- Clive Gray as Muffett
- Rodney Paulden as Munn Major
- Keith Janess as Orris
- Christopher Moran as Root
- Michael Cashman as Terhew
- Paul Aston as Trimble
- Michael Howe as Unman
- Colin Barrie as Wittering

The closing credits also list Zigo (who never appears in the film) as "absent".

== Production ==
=== Development ===
The radio play was adapted for BBC TV in 1965. Film rights were bought by Mediarts, a new company established in London and Hollywood in 1969 by Gareth Wigan, Richard Gregson and Alan Livingston. Unman was to be the first of four pictures from the company, the others being the directorial debut of Frederic Raphael, a screenplay (On My Way to Where) by Dory Previn and a script by Odie Hawkins. Unman was the company's only film. It was distributed by Paramount. "This is a more powerful film, a more direct film than any I've done recently," said Hemmings at the time. "It has a slight gothic flavour, a kind of raw edge to it." David Hemmings made the film without telling Hemdale, the company who had exclusive call on his services. This led to a lawsuit.

=== Filming ===
Filming began in August 1970. The film was set in Cornwall. Some outdoor scenes were filmed at St David's College Llandudno, Wales, and nearby St. Tudno's churchyard, Great Orme, but others and interior scenes were mostly filmed in the buildings of Reading Blue Coat School, Sonning, Berkshire, using some of its pupils as extras during the summer holidays. Hemmings' wife Gayle Hunnicutt gave birth to their child during filming. The film was screened at the 1971 San Sebastian Film Festival.

== Critical reception ==
David Mcgillivray wrote in The Monthly Film Bulletin: "Giles Cooper's TV play was in turn adapted from his 1957 radio production, and no doubt the nightmare fantasy of Lower Five B was most convincing when suggested only in sound. The trouble with the film version is that Ebony's improbable boys, devoid of individuality and bristling with Lord of the Flies-style menace, now clash disconcertingly with their surroundings, a very real establishment in Llandudno. To go with the genuine locations, there is a genuine-looking, crumpled-collared staff and an array of ink-stained pupils who are not patently fresh from the stage school. Ebony himself is easily recognisable as a teacher struggling hopelessly to discipline a class of delinquents, and David Hemmings' performance succeeds in communicating the feeling of desperation that inexperience fosters. But while John Mackenzie's capable direction suggests a greater involvement with his material than in his earlier One Brief Summer (1971) (although an inclination towards fussy camerawork – in the contrived linking shots – is still present), the nightmare violence is never entirely persuasive. One is more inclined at the close to echo Ebony's dismayed "Why did they do it?" than to ponder on the sinister significance of absence."

The BFI's Screenonline called it "a finely wrought psychological suspense drama". Mackenzie later said he was "proud" of the film. Variety said "The viewer may be both intrigued and puzzled, for while film is a compelling piece of dramatics about innocent-looking terrorists, it asks a great deal of credence." Leslie Halliwell said: "Macabre school story which overreaches itself and peters out." The Los Angeles Times called it "a beautifully polished piece of business." Leonard Maltin's Movie Guide rates the film three stars, calling it a "nifty little sleeper... creepy, chilling mystery, loaded with twists..."
