= John Mackenzie (film director) =

Scottish film director (1928–2011)

- Born: John Leonard Duncan MacKenzie; 22 May 1928; Edinburgh, Scotland, UK
- Died: 8 June 2011 (aged 83); London, England, UK
- Education: University of Edinburgh
- Occupation: Film director
- Years active: 1966–2009

John Leonard Duncan Mackenzie (22 May 1928 – 8 June 2011) was a Scottish film and television director. He worked in British film from the late 1960s, first as an assistant director and later as an independent director himself.

== Early life ==
Mackenzie was born in Edinburgh, where he attended Holy Cross Academy. He studied history at the University of Edinburgh. He studied drama and joined Edinburgh's Gateway Theatre Company. He worked as a teacher and moved to London in 1960.

== Career ==
=== Early career ===
Mackenzie began his career with Ken Loach, acting as the latter's assistant director on such works as Up the Junction (1965) and Cathy Come Home (1966). This training allowed Mackenzie to begin a move into directing himself, as well as teaching him the skills of working on location with non-professional, local actors to a tight budget and schedule.

=== Directing, film and television ===
Mackenzie initially worked on television plays following his apprenticeship with Loach. During this period he directed episodes of The Jazz Age and ITV Saturday Night Theatre. His first film was the television drama There Is Also Tomorrow (1969), followed by two feature films One Brief Summer (1970) and Unman, Wittering and Zigo, an adaptation of Giles Cooper's radio play (1971). He collaborated with writer Peter McDougall on three episodes of Play for Today: Just Another Saturday (1975), The Elephants' Graveyard (1976) starring Billy Connolly and Just a Boys' Game (1979). Mackenzie still largely worked for television, aside from the independent production Made (1972), until in 1979 he directed the highly acclaimed A Sense of Freedom, also with a screenplay by McDougall, a BAFTA-nominated film about the Scottish gangster Jimmy Boyle. Freedom was surpassed, however, by Mackenzie's next film, the gangster piece The Long Good Friday, generally accepted as his masterpiece.

The Long Good Friday, starring Bob Hoskins and Helen Mirren, opened up opportunities to work in the United States. The Honorary Consul was adapted from Graham Greene's novel by Christopher Hampton. Also released as Beyond the Limit, the film re-united Mackenzie with Hoskins, as well as giving him the chance to direct Michael Caine and Richard Gere. Mackenzie's other films of this period include The Innocent (1985) and The Fourth Protocol (1987).

The greatest success that Mackenzie enjoyed in his American period was Ruby (1992), a biopic of Jack Ruby, the Texan nightclub owner who assassinated Lee Harvey Oswald. Ruby starred Academy Award-nominated Danny Aiello and Twin Peaks actor Sherilyn Fenn.

Another film of this period was The Last of the Finest, a UK-US thriller starring Brian Dennehy. Mackenzie returned to the UK in 1993. He later directed films such as Deadly Voyage (1996) and When the Sky Falls (2000).

== Death ==
Mackenzie died following a stroke on 8 June 2011, some three weeks after his 83rd birthday. He is survived by his three daughters: Colyn, Katherine and Rebecca. His wife Wendy Marshall, whom he married in 1956, predeceased him.

== Filmography ==
As Assistant Director

Year	Title	Notes
1965-1966	The Wednesday Play	Episodes: Up the Junction and Cathy Come Home

As Director: Film

Year	Title
1971	One Brief Summer
1971	Unman, Wittering and Zigo
1972	Made
1977	Apaches
1980	The Long Good Friday
1983	The Honorary Consul
1985	The Innocent
1987	The Fourth Protocol
1990	The Last of the Finest
1992	Ruby
2000	When the Sky Falls
2003	Quicksand

As Director: Television

Year	Title	Notes
1967-1969	The Wednesday Play	4 episodes
1971-1979	Play for Today	9 episodes, including The Cheviot, the Stag and the Black, Black Oil, Double Dare and Just a Boys' Game
1981	A Sense of Freedom	TV film
1986	Act of Vengeance	TV film
1993	Voyage	TV film
1995	The Infiltrator	TV film
1996	Deadly Voyage	TV film
1998	Looking After Jo Jo	Miniseries
