= David Starkey (disambiguation) =

David Starkey (born 1945) is an English historian and television presenter.

David Starkey may also refer to:

- David Starkey (maritime historian) (born 1954), British maritime historian
- David Starkey (poet) (born 1962), American poet and academic
