= A Sense of Freedom =

- DVD cover
- Genre: True crime Drama; Thriller
- Written by: Peter McDougall
- Story by: Jimmy Boyle
- Directed by: John Mackenzie
- Starring: David Hayman; Jake D'Arcy; Sean Scanlan; Hector Nicol; Fulton Mackay
- Music by: Frankie Miller; Rory Gallagher
- Country of origin: United Kingdom
- Original language: English

Production
- Producer: Jeremy Isaacs
- Cinematography: Chris Menges
- Editor: Alan MacMillan
- Running time: 85 minutes
- Production company: Scottish Television
- Budget: £500,000

Original release
- Network: ITV
- Release: 17 February 1981

A Sense of Freedom is a 1981 Scottish crime film directed by John Mackenzie for Scottish Television. The film stars David Hayman and featured Jake D'Arcy, Sean Scanlan, Hector Nicol, Alex Norton and Fulton Mackay. It is based on the 1977 autobiography of Glasgow gangster Jimmy Boyle, who was reputed to be Scotland's most violent man.

A harrowing tale of a habitual and brutal criminal. Boyle repeatedly resisted attempts by the Prison Service to dampen his temper. He was brutally assaulted many times by Prison Officers. He also assaulted many staff including a brutal attack causing an officer to lose his eye.

The film received a BAFTA nomination for Best Single Play.

== Cast ==
- Jimmy Boyle - David Hayman
- Rab - Jake D'Arcy
- Jada - Sean Scanlan
- Malkie - Alex Norton
- Piper - John Murtagh
- Chief officer - Roy Hanlon
- Inspector Davidson - Fulton Mackay
- Bobbie Dougan - Martin Black
- Uncle Jodie - Hector Nicol
- Barman - Frank Welshman
- Boyle's mother - Katy Gardiner
- Archie - Billy Jeffrey
- Judge - David Steuart
- Prison officer - Ken Drury
- Prison governor - Gerry Slevin
- Prison governor - Ron Paterson
- Prison governor - Hugh Martin
- Special unit officer - Jackie Farrell

== Production ==
Jeremy Isaacs read the book A Sense of Freedom and thought that it was ideal for filming. He optioned the book and attracted interest from Scottish Television (STV); Isaacs wrote that Bill Brown's support was crucial. Isaac then attached writer Peter MacDougall and director John Mackenzie who had worked together for the BBC on three episodes of Play for Today: Just Another Saturday (1975), The Elephants' Graveyard (1976) and Just a Boys' Game (1979). The film was financed by STV.

Hayman said that he spent five weeks training in the gym and two weeks in pubs in the east end of Glasgow observing people, in preparation for his role. Due to non-co-operation by the Scottish Prison Service in allowing a film crew access to their property, Hayman's scenes in prison were filmed in Dublin's Kilmainham Jail. Strathclyde Council also prohibited the film from being shot within its borders. Local courts refused to allow the film to use it as a location, forcing the producers to build a set. However most of the film was eventually shot in Scotland.

In August 1980 Scottish Television refused to allow the film to be entered into the Edinburgh Film Festival, which was showing a retrospective of John MacKenzie's work. Producer Kenith Todd said this was essentially a ban.

== Music ==
The music is by Frankie Miller and Rory Gallagher.

== Release ==
The film was broadcast on ITV on 17 February 1981. The following evening they screened a debate about the case called A Long Term Solution? chaired by Desmond Wilcox.

The Scottish Daily Record called it "The most powerful piece of television ever to come out of Scotland." "Rarely has time passed so slowly or tediously," wrote Nancy Banks-Smith in The Guardian about the film who noted that McKenzie had triumphed in his objective to convey the feeling of time passing slowly. The Daily Telegraph review rated the film as outstanding and praised Hayman's powerful performance.

In May 1984 it was announced that HandMade Films - which had helped finance MacKenzie's 1980 film The Long Good Friday - had agreed to distribute the film in cinemas outside the UK.

The film received a release in some US cinemas in 1985.

== Notes ==
- Isaacs, Jeremy (2006). Look me in the eye : a life in television. Little, Brown.
