= Jon Morrison =

Scottish actor

- Born: Glasgow
- Occupation: Actor

Jon Morrison is a Scottish actor born december, 16, 1952, who has appeared in many plays, films and television series since the early 1970s, including The Bill, Bergerac, Taggart and Vera.

His best-known parts have been in the Peter McDougall plays Just Another Saturday (1975), about sectarianism in Glasgow, and The Elephants' Graveyard (1976), both with Billy Connolly and both part of BBC's Play for Today series. He also featured in Gary Oldman's Nil by Mouth (1997)and Ken Loach's Sweet Sixteen.

Morrison portrayed DC Kenny Lockhart in the ITV detective series Vera, from the start of the programme in 2011 up to and including the final series in 2025.
