= Ida Schuster =

Scottish actress (1918–2020)

- Born: 28 September 1918; Glasgow, Scotland
- Died: 9 April 2020 (aged 101); Glasgow, Scotland
- Occupation: Actress
- Years active: 1937–2007
- Spouse: Dr. Allan Berkeley
- Children: 2

Ida Schuster (28 September 1918 – 9 April 2020) was a Scottish theatre, radio and television actress, theatre director, and a leading figure in Glasgow's 20th-century Jewish theatre community.

== Early life and education ==
Schuster was born in Glasgow, one of nine children born to Jewish immigrants who moved from Vilnius to Glasgow at the end of the 19th century. She attended Abbotsford Primary School in the Gorbals.

== Career ==
Ida's older sister, Ray, married Avrom Greenbaum, who founded the Glasgow Jewish Institute Players, and her brother, Leon Schuster, was production manager for GJIP, and, later, when it merged with other groups, Glasgow Unity Theatre.

Ida began acting at the age of 15, and was a prominent member of both theatre troupes. Glasgow Unity Theatre, was, she said: “...a particular response to a particular time. These were heady days and after the war we really felt utopia had arrived.” She turned professional in the 1950s.

In 1973, she described her feelings about the artist within the community:

Well...the bridge games, the social activities for charities which form so much of the pattern, must be partly rejected if one is to survive with any creative energy. And as one grows older, responsibilities increase and energy decreases. This happens to all of us and youth takes over. Make no mistake, our young folk will be holding the reins with great expertise, well equipped for the battles which lie ahead.

In 2020, Schuster was known as "the world's oldest podcaster", because she hosted Old School, an audio series about her life, introduced by actor Alan Cumming.

== Personal life ==
Ida was married to Dr. Allan Berkeley until his death in 1990, after 45 years of marriage. At the time of his death, she was appearing in The Steamie and had to leave the cast. The couple had two children, Howard and Peter. Schuster died on 9 April 2020, at the age of 101, from COVID-19.

== Theatrical productions ==
- The Dybbuk (4-25 February 1951), her first major role, as part of The Festival of Jewish Arts at Glasgow's McLellan Galleries, which responded to, and coincided with, the Festival of Britain
- Blood Wedding (18-29 November 1952), a GJIP production, with Schuster playing the role of The Mother
- Morning Star (1959)m GJIP's revival of the Sylvia Regan play
- Various productions as part of the Citizens' Theatre (1962-63 season):
  - A Midsummer Night's Dream
  - A Streetcar Named Desire
  - The Good Woman of Setzuan (première of new translation by John Willett)
  - Uncle Vanya
  - Arms and the Man
  - Saturmacnalia by Cliff Hanley
  - Serjeant Musgrave's Dance
  - The Importance of Being Earnest
  - Henry IV by Luigi Pirandello
  - The Partridge Dance by Ronald Mavor
  - The Birthday Party
  - The School for Scandal
  - The Waltz of the Toreadors
  - V Minus One by John Hubbard
  - A Resounding Tinkle
  - The Love of Four Colonels
- Strictly for the Birds (1966)
- Dr. Angelus (1974), Angelus in the Pitlochry Festival Theatre production
- Blithe Spirit (1974), Madame Arcati in the Pitlochry Festival Theatre production
- Here for a father (1974), Medea in the Pitlochry Festival Theatre production
- Personal Effects (1974), Miss Anders in the Pitlochry Festival Theatre production
- The Slab Boys (premiered at the Traverse Theatre, 6 April 1978) Sadie, the tea lady
- Country Life (1979), noted for a strong performance of a "painted widow desperate for affection"
- Mary Stuart (1985), Hannah, at the Glasgow Citizen's Theatre
- Lucy's Play (1986), noted for portraying a "delightfully wearisome mother"
- The Steamie (1987-1990), Mrs. Culfeathers, acting alongside Elaine C. Smith, Dorothy Paul and Katy Murphy
- The House of Bernarda Alba (1989), Maria Josefa, at the Lyceum Theatre, Edinburgh
- Daughters in Distress (1989), noted for a "tender, funny and uncommonly moving study"
- Musical Chairs (1993), noted as "worth an award in itself"

== As director ==
Amongst her work as a theatre director was the inaugural production (opening 12 May 1981) of Eine Kleine Nachmutze [Eine Kleine Nachtmusik] at the Tron Theatre.

== Selected filmography ==
- Death Watch (La mort en direct) (1980, actress, Old Woman)
- Passing Glory (1987), Gillies MacKinnon's NFTS graduation film, also starring Fiona Chalmers and Alan Cumming
- A Short History of the Glasgow Jewish Institute Players (1996 documentary, writer and producer)
- A Shot at Glory (2000, actress, Wee Brenda)

== Television appearances ==
- One's Company (1974), co-starred with Robert Urquhart and Leena Skoog, broadcast on BBC Scotland
- Garnock Way (1976-1979), Carla the café owner
- The Dunroamin' Rising (1988) a play by Colin MacDonald
- And the Cow Jumped Over the Moon (1991) a play by Donna Franceschild broadcast on BBC1
- Doctor Finlay (1993)
- Taggart (1990-2005, various characters)
- River City (2002), Lily Fraser
