= The Wrath of God =

1972 film by Ralph Nelson

- Original film poster
- Directed by: Ralph Nelson
- Written by: Jack Higgins; Ralph Nelson
- Based on: The Wrath of God; 1971 novel by James Graham
- Produced by: Ralph Nelson
- Starring: Robert Mitchum; Frank Langella; John Colicos; Victor Buono; Rita Hayworth; Paula Pritchett; Ken Hutchison
- Cinematography: Alex Phillips, Jr.
- Edited by: J. Terry Williams
- Music by: Lalo Schifrin
- Distributed by: Metro-Goldwyn-Mayer
- Release date: July 14, 1972 (New York City)
- Running time: 111 minutes
- Country: United States
- Language: English

The Wrath of God is a 1972 American Western film directed by Ralph Nelson and starring: Robert Mitchum, Frank Langella, Rita Hayworth and Victor Buono. Filmed in Mexico, it is based on the 1971 novel by Jack Higgins writing as James Graham.

== Plot ==
In 1922, in an unnamed country south of Mexico torn by revolution, Emmet Keogh, an Irish patriot and political assassin, is coerced into transporting a truckload of Scotch whiskey for English gunrunner, Jennings. Along the way, he helps American Catholic priest, Father Oliver Van Horne, who has a flat tire and later, his car stuck above rocks. However, when Keogh reaches his destination, the man he was to deliver the cargo to is dead, killed by Colonel Santilla's men. The men are also about to have their way with a mute Aymara Indian woman named Chela. When Keogh tries to stop them, they decide to hang him. Van Horne shows up just in time, and proceeds to kill Santilla's men with a machine gun except for one who escapes to inform Santilla. Van Horne, Keogh, and Chela flee, but are later caught.

After subjecting Keogh, Van Horne, and Jennings (who was actually smuggling arms, not whiskey) to a mock execution by a firing squad, Santilla offers to spare them if they will assassinate Tomas de la Plata, who lives with his mother in a well-protected region in Mojada, which is under his control. He offers them equal shares of $53,000, found in Van Horne's suitcase. Santilla has already wrangled an invitation for Keogh and Jennings, posing as mining company employees, as de la Plata is anxious to reopen a silver mine. On the way, Keogh meets Aymara Chief Nacho and is reunited with Chela, who gives him a necklace. Unbeknownst to Keogh, the Aymaras are a matriarchal society, and women choose their husbands; they are now married.

Once there, Van Horne sets about cleaning the church, assisted by orphaned choirboy, Pablito, while Keogh and Jennings dine at de la Plata's hacienda. De la Plata, however, hates priests, and several have been killed in town. The next morning, Keogh and Jennings pretend to inspect the mine, while Van Horne comes along to bless it. There is a cave-in, and the three men rescue Senora de la Plata and several miners except one dying man.

Van Horne defiantly declares that he will hold a mass for the deceased at 4 p.m. in the afternoon to lure de la Plata into an ambush, but when Senora de la Plata shows up for the mass, he aborts his plan. De la Plata spares Van Horne once at his religious mother's insistence, who shields him from her son's hatred, but forbids him to perform any priestly functions. It is revealed that during Mojada's liberation in his absence, de la Plata's father was brutally murdered and his sister (who later committed suicide, out of shame) and mother were violated by Santilla's men, while the corrupt local priest stood by and did nothing.

Van Horne tries again, announcing that he will hold a procession at 9 a.m. the next morning. He also tells the townspeople he will perform: marriages, masses, communion, sacraments, baptisms and hear confessions that night, hoping that they will be grateful enough to join the trio into taking up arms against de la Plata.

The next morning, some of de la Plata's men are killed, but their leader is only wounded and escapes. Later, Nacho, all wounded, comes to inform the three men that de la Plata has taken hostages, including Chela and Pablito, and threatens to shoot them, one by one every half hour, until Van Horne comes to him. Jurado, de la Plata's second in command, brings Pablito into Mojada and shoots him down in cold blood before Van Horne's eyes. Van Horne, who was about to flee, changes his mind and gives himself up. He manages to kill someone he thinks is de la Plata, but it is only a double. However, Keogh, Nacho, and several Aymara men sneak in to save Chela, the only hostage kept in to be used as bait; the former blasts the main entrance with grenades, weakening the doors enough for Jennings to drive Van Horne's car through them. The townspeople follow. In the ensuing fight, Jennings is mortally wounded by both de la Plata and Jurado whereas Jurado is mortally wounded by Nacho. Jennings blows himself and Jurado up with a grenade. De la Plata is about to kill Keogh until he is shot by his own mother. He stumbles out and collapses near the stone cross Van Horne has been tied to. Van Horne manages to topple the cross onto de la Plata before the latter tries to shoot someone in a final attempt, killing him. Everyone tends to Van Horne and Keogh's wounds as church bells are being sounded across the distance.

== Cast ==
- Robert Mitchum as Father Oliver Van Horne
- Frank Langella as Tomas de la Plata
- Rita Hayworth as Senora de la Plata
- John Colicos as Col. Santilla
- Victor Buono as Jennings
- Ken Hutchison as Emmet Keogh
- Paula Pritchett as Chela
- Gregory Sierra as Jurado
- Frank Ramirez as Carlos Moreno
- Enrique Lucero as Nacho
- Jorge Russek as Cordona
- José Luis Parades as Pablito
- Aurora Clavel as Senora Moreno
- Pancho Cordova as Tacho

== Notes ==
The film is a lighthearted adaptation of the western noir novel The Wrath of God written by Harry Patterson and published under the pseudonym of James Graham in 1971, and later as Jack Higgins.

Alluding to the fact that the film is untroubled by the need for any apparent consistency, film critic Roger Ebert describes it as "a simple, dashing tale told for sheer fun."

Lalo Schifrin's Latin-tinged soundtrack score was described as "jazzy at times, more serious at others – but almost always served up with groovy touches that make this one especially appealing to our ears."

The film marks the final screen appearance by Hayworth, whose health worsened as Alzheimer's disease took hold.

The film was released the same year as Werner Herzog's acclaimed film Aguirre, the Wrath of God.

== Production ==
Actor Ken Hutchison had a near catastrophic accident near the end of filming in which he cut himself on some broken glass, opening a gash from wrist to elbow. He was discovered by Mitchum's wife Dorothy, who applied a life saving tourniquet to stop the bleeding. Since Hutchison was in nearly every scene, the insurance company covering the production shut it down for a month for him to heal. When he returned, he was unable to do anything strenuous, and had to keep the arm covered. With the long layoff, the cast and crew just wanted to get the film done, resulting in confusion, continuity gaps and dislocation.
