= The Last of the Finest =

1990 film by John Mackenzie

- Theatrical release poster
- Directed by: John Mackenzie
- Screenplay by: Jere Cunningham; Thomas Lee Wright; George Armitage
- Story by: Jere Cunningham
- Produced by: John Davis
- Starring: Brian Dennehy; Joe Pantoliano; Jeff Fahey; Bill Paxton; Deborra-Lee Furness; Guy Boyd; Henry Darrow
- Cinematography: Juan Ruiz Anchía
- Edited by: Graham Walker
- Music by: Michael Hoenig; Jack Nitzsche; Mick Taylor
- Production company: Davis Entertainment
- Distributed by: Orion Pictures
- Release date: March 9, 1990
- Running time: 106 minutes
- Country: United States
- Language: English
- Budget: $13 million
- Box office: $1,531,489 (domestic)

The Last of the Finest, also released as Blue Heat, is a 1990 American crime action film directed by John Mackenzie and starring Brian Dennehy, Joe Pantoliano, Jeff Fahey, and Bill Paxton.

== Plot ==
The film opens at Canyon Park where LAPD narcotics Detective Lieu. Frank Daly (Brian Dennehy) is coaching fellow unit members Wayne Gross (Joe Pantoliano), Ricky Rodriguez (Jeff Fahey), and Howard Jones (Bill Paxton) during a flag football game. After the game, Daly tells Captain Joe Torres (Henry Darrow) that his team is working on a major bust. He asks Torres to help keep the DEA out of the operation.

Later that night, Daly and his team surveil a massive drug deal at a meat processing plant. However, when Daly radios Torres for backup, the captain breaks his word by insisting that he wait for the DEA. Daly ignores the order and orders the bust to go forward. During the raid, trafficker Anthony Reece (Michael C. Gwynne) and his main henchman torch the money earned during the deal, setting the whole plant on fire.

Reece and his henchman drive up to a diplomatic retreat in the mountains to inform their boss, R.J. Norringer (Guy Boyd), about the fate of the money. Cpt. Torres suspends Daly and his team pending an investigation. The team use their free time during their suspension to make good on their promise to install a septic tank at Canyon Park. Through one of their informants, Fast Eddie (Xander Berkeley), Daly arranges for a prostitute to meet with Reece and surveil him further. As Reece waits for the prostitute, Rodriguez witnesses him receive an envelope from someone who he later learns is a DEA agent.

Eddie calls Daly to tell him that Reece was a psycho, and he viciously beat the prostitute. Daly and the team heads to the motel where Eddie is sheltering the woman, but before they can get there, gunmen sent by Reese kill them both. Jones chases the shooters but is ambushed and gunned down.

Daly is charged with violating the terms of his suspension, resulting in Jones' death. Daly resigns in disgust; Gross resigns in solidarity. Rodriguez initially does not want to resign, because being a cop is his whole identity, but he eventually agrees to resign and pursue the case as civilians outside of the LAPD's oversight. They raise $29,000 for their operation by shaking down several dealers.

The team trails Reece to an event for the Central American Relief Fund, where they witness Norringer give a speech advocating support for Central American rebel forces. On the roof of the building, a videotape is made of Reece meeting with Norringer. They visit Daly's retired former partner Tommy Grogan (John Finnegan), who reads Reece and Norringer's lips to determine that there is a major deal going down the next night.

As the team investigates Norringer's harbor operation, Captain Torres (who is secretly in Norringer's pocket) visits Grogan to determine what he told Daly's team. At Norringer's warehouse, the team realizes that the drug sales are used to finance weapons purchases on behalf of Central American rebels. Norringer's men give chase, and the team escapes in one of the loaded trucks. After they crash it into an overpass, they find that it is loaded with over $22 million.

They hide the cash in the cesspool at the park. As they clean up afterward, they find Grogan's body in a locker. Realizing that their families are in danger, they gather all of their loved ones in a secluded spot and debate their next step. They agree to pursue the case, rather than run off with the money. Daly confronts Torres about Grogan, and he confesses to his involvement in the scheme, explaining that he just does not care anymore about right and wrong.

Daly sets up an exchange at the park, with Gross and Rodriguez hiding in sniper positions. They have also planted small charges around the field. When Torres and Norringer arrive, a gunfight ensues. The police arrive, because Torres had called them in a final act of contrition, and they help Daly and his team defend themselves. Norringer, Torres, and Reece are all killed in the firefight. The film closes with the rededication of Canyon Park in Jones' honor. Daly is back in uniform, and the camera lingers on a TV where Norringer's handler, a corrupt presidential aide, denies involvement in the scheme while expressing support for the rebels.

== Cast ==
- Brian Dennehy as Detective Lieutenant Frank Daly
- Joe Pantoliano as Detective Wayne Gross
- Jeff Fahey as Detective Ricky Rodriguez
- Bill Paxton as Detective Howard Jones
- Michael C. Gwynne as Anthony Reece
- Henry Darrow as Captain Joe Torres
- Burke Byrnes as Commander Orsini
- Xander Berkeley as Eddie "Fast Eddie"
- Guy Boyd as R.J. Norringer
- John Finnegan as Tommy Grogan
- J. Kenneth Campbell as Lauren Calvert
- Deborra-Lee Furness as Linda Daly
- Patrick Stack as Press Officer

== Production ==
Production began on November 7, 1988 under the working title Street Legal. Director John Mackenzie performed an uncredited re-write on the original script, filming wrapped up in early 1989, The film's original title, Street Legal, had to be changed because there was already a popular Canadian television show of the same name, so the film's title was changed to Point of Impact, but that title was jettisoned quickly and replaced with The Last of the Finest.

== Release ==
The film was originally set to be released on October 20, 1989, but was delayed for a few months. The film was released on March 9, 1990. The film was released under the title Blue Heat In several international markets.

== Critical Reaction ==
Owen Gleiberman gave the film an "F", writing, "Scene for humdrum scene, The Last of the Finest may be the dullest thriller ever made...[it] doesn't deserve to take up space on a video-store shelf, let alone a theater screen." Variety called it "a rarely attempted brand of pastiche film". Writing in The New York Times, Janet Maslin took time to credit the cinematography of Juan Ruiz-Anchia for its "crisp, clear look". She found the fact that the stolen money was stored in a septic tank unsubtle.
