= F/X =

1986 film by Robert Mandel

- Theatrical release poster
- Directed by: Robert Mandel
- Written by: Gregory Fleeman; Robert T. Megginson
- Produced by: Dodi Fayed; Jack Wiener
- Starring: Bryan Brown; Brian Dennehy; Diane Venora; Cliff De Young
- Cinematography: Miroslav Ondrícek
- Edited by: Terry Rawlings
- Music by: Bill Conti
- Distributed by: Orion Pictures
- Release date: February 7, 1986
- Running time: 108 minutes
- Country: United States
- Language: English
- Budget: $10 million
- Box office: $20.6 million

F/X (also known as or subtitled Murder by Illusion) is a 1986 American action thriller film directed by Robert Mandel, written by Gregory Fleeman and Robert T. Megginson, and starring Bryan Brown, Brian Dennehy, Diane Venora, Cliff De Young, and Angela Bassett in her film debut. The film follows a special effects expert who is hired by the U.S. Department of Justice to stage the murder of a mobster about to enter the Witness Protection Program, but complications arise when he is targeted for murder himself; meanwhile, an NYPD detective becomes suspicious of the circumstances of the case.

The film was released to positive reviews from critics and was a box office success, earning $20.6 million on a $10 million budget. A sequel, F/X2: The Deadly Art of Illusion, was released in 1991. A spinoff television series, F/X: The Series, was produced from 1996 to 1998.

== Plot ==
Movie special-effects expert Rollie Tyler is hired by the Department of Justice (DoJ) to stage the murder of Mafia informant Nicholas DeFranco. DeFranco is set to testify against his former Mafia bosses and go into witness protection, but the DoJ is afraid he will be killed before the trial. Rollie rigs a gun with blanks and gives DeFranco a rig with radio transmitters and fake blood packs to simulate bullet hits. The DoJ supervisor on the case, Edward Mason, asks Rollie to be the "assassin" wearing a disguise.

During the preparation, Lipton, the DoJ agent in charge, handles Rollie's gun. DeFranco wears Rollie's rig to an Italian restaurant, and the public "assassination" goes flawlessly. Rollie is picked up by Lipton, who tries to shoot him. In the struggle for Lipton's gun, the driver is killed and the car crashes, allowing Rollie to escape. He contacts Mason, who instructs him to wait for other agents to take him to a safe location; however, another man thought to be Rollie is killed by the agents, proving that Mason is trying to kill him too. Rollie retreats to his girlfriend Ellen's apartment, but she is killed the next morning by a sniper, whom Rollie kills in a fight.

NYPD homicide detective Leo McCarthy investigates the deaths of Ellen and the sniper and realizes it is connected to DeFranco, whom he has been pursuing for years. He discovers that the assassination was faked and Mason planned it. When he is suspended by his captain for his reckless methods, McCarthy steals the captain's badge and gun.

Using an elaborate phone setup, Rollie lures Lipton out in the open and kidnaps him, taking him on a rough ride in the trunk to get Mason's address out of him. After stealing his van from an impound, Rollie goes to Mason's mansion where he defeats Mason's guards; McCarthy follows and alerts the New York State Police.

Mason and DeFranco realize Rollie has found them. DeFranco shoots out several windows in Mason's study, and Rollie falls through one, appearing to be dead. Mason and DeFranco try to leave the house when a helicopter arrives, but DeFranco is shocked by a rigged metal screen door, disrupting his pacemaker. Before he dies of heart failure, Mason takes from him a key to a Swiss safe deposit box containing the funds DeFranco stole from the Mafia.

Mason prepares to escape but is surprised by Rollie, who holds him at gunpoint. Mason tries to bribe Rollie by giving him the key, proposing that they split the money, but Rollie refuses and puts his gun down. Mason picks up the gun and demands the key back, but Rollie reveals that the gun is empty and has Krazy Glue on its grip before shoving Mason out of the mansion toward the police, who misinterpret his actions as a threat and fatally shoot him.

Rollie fakes his death and is taken to the morgue, where McCarthy confronts him. Rollie impersonates DeFranco at the bank in Geneva and retrieves the $15 million in Mafia funds, which he shares with McCarthy.

== Cast ==
- Bryan Brown as Roland "Rollie" Tyler
- Brian Dennehy as Leo McCarthy
- Diane Venora as Ellen
- Cliff De Young as Martin Lipton
- Mason Adams as Colonel Edward Mason
- Jerry Orbach as Nicholas DeFranco
- Joe Grifasi as Mickey
- Trey Wilson as Lieutenant Murdoch
- Tom Noonan as Varrick
- Josie de Guzman as Marisa Velez
- M'el Dowd as Miss Joyce Lehman
- Roscoe Orman as Captain Wallenger
- Patrick Stack as Sgt. Littauer
- Martha Gehman as Andy
- Angela Bassett as TV Reporter

== Production ==
The unsolicited screenplay was written by two novice writers, actor Gregory Fleeman and documentarian Robert T. Megginson. Producer Jack Wiener read their script, which was submitted as a low-budget television movie, and felt that it should be made into a theatrical release. Wiener and his co-producer Dodi Fayed hired Robert Mandel, an Off-Broadway director. They did not want to hire an action director, but instead wanted a director who would bring a realistic touch to the film and make the audience care about the main character having been impressed with Mandel's direction of actors in Independence Day. Mandel accepted the job because he wanted to dispel the perception that he was a "soft, arty director". Initially he was not impressed with the film's screenplay, which he felt was not well-crafted but felt that it provided for "a lot of action and a lot of things I did not have under my belt". In preparation for the film's action sequences, Mandel studied chase scenes from Bullitt and The French Connection. To pull off the film's special effects, the producers hired John Stears, who had worked on the first eight James Bond films and shared a special effects Academy Award for Star Wars Episode IV: A New Hope.

Principal photography began in the spring of 1985 in New York City, with additional filming taking place in nearby Orange, New Jersey and Rye, New York. Production was completed on July 6, 1985, in Geneva, Switzerland.

A preview screening in the San Fernando Valley produced some of the best statistics Orion Pictures had seen in some time. A week before its release, a film industry screening was very successful, as was its premiere at the United States Film Festival (later known as the Sundance Film Festival).

== Release ==
While F/X performed well at the box office, grossing over $20 million in North America (well over its $10 million budget), executives at Orion Pictures, which financed and distributed the film, felt that it could have performed even better with a different title. One executive claimed that no one understood what the title meant, but they accepted it because it was what the producers wanted. Wiener admitted that they thought that the two letters together would be "provocative" like MASH and admitted that they had made a mistake.

== Reception ==
F/X holds an 89% rating on Rotten Tomatoes based on reviews from 27 critics. The site's consensus states; "Smart, twisty, and perfectly cast, the effects-assisted neo-noir F/X reminds viewers that a well-told story is the most special effect of all."

Vincent Canby praised the look of the film in his review for The New York Times, writing, "the movie, which looks as if it had been made on an A-picture budget, has a lot of the zest one associates with special-effects-filled B-pictures". Roger Ebert gave the film three and a half stars out of four:

This movie takes a lot of delight in being more psychologically complex than it has to be. It contains fights and shootouts and big chase scenes, but they're all firmly centered on who the characters are and what they mean to one another.

In his review for The Globe and Mail, Jay Scott wrote, "F/X is simply out to give a good time, which it does superbly". Paul Attanasio in his review for The Washington Post praised Brian Dennehy's performance:

Dennehy brings magic to the role—he's large, and he enlarges it. With his sly eyes and little can opener of a nose, his shoulders a yard wide, his hair massing in gray curls behind his ears, he dances through the movie like a mastodon in toe shoes.

In his review for The Sunday Times, George Perry praised the film's premise as a "nice idea, but the effects themselves are merely ingenious when they might have been spectacular". Sheila Benson wrote in her review for the Los Angeles Times:

Where F/X floats above the crowd are in its performances; in the perfection of Miroslav Ondricek's photography, Mel Bourne's production design, John Stears' effects and Terry Rawlings' crisp, succinct editing; in the virtually unpredictable twists and turns of its plot, and in the sheer joy of watching a hero use his skill and his wits to solve a problem.

John Nubbin reviewed F/X for Different Worlds magazine and stated that "The American public is tired of films with no story, merely lots of pretty pictures. All entertainment needs a strong story to have any sort of mass appeal - not just F/X."
