= The Innocent (1985 film) =

- Directed by: John Mackenzie
- Written by: Ray Jenkins
- Based on: novel The Aura and the Kingfisher by Tom Hart
- Produced by: Jacky Stoller
- Starring: Andrew Hawley; Liam Neeson; Miranda Richardson; Kika Markham; Tom Bell; Kate Foster
- Cinematography: Roger Deakins
- Edited by: Tony Woollard
- Music by: Francis Monkman
- Distributed by: Curzon Film Distributors
- Release date: 1985
- Running time: 101 minutes
- Country: United Kingdom
- Language: English
- Budget: £1 million

The Innocent is a 1985 John Mackenzie drama film, starring Andrew Hawley, Liam Neeson and Miranda Richardson, and is set in the Yorkshire Dales just after World War I. The film is about the struggles of a young Yorkshire boy trying to come to grips with squabbling parents, a doctor who wants to institutionalize him because of his epilepsy, and a mother who refuses to accept that he is different in any way. The film was produced by Tempest Films Ltd.

== Cast ==
- Andrew Hawley as Timothy 'Tim' Dobson
- Kika Markham as Mrs. Dobson
- Kate Foster as Win
- Liam Neeson as John Carns
- Patrick Daley as Eddie King
- Paul Askew as Stanley
- Lorraine Peters as Win's grandmother
- Tom Bell as Frank Dobson
- Richard Hope as Mouth organ player
- Jack Carr as Mill owner
- Clive Wood as Turner
- Miranda Richardson as Mary Turner
- Richard Laxton as Reg Reid
- Denis Lill as Doctor
- Alison Lloyd as Woolshop owner
- Bill Rodgers as Drinksbearer
