= Patrick Stack =

American actor and stand-up comedian

- Occupations: Actor, stand-up comedian
- Years active: 1970s–present

Patrick Stack is an American actor and stand-up comedian. He is best known for playing Lieutenant Clinton Morgen in the 1982 film First Blood.

Stack performed stand-up comedy with his partner Nathan Lane, performing under the comedy team Stack and Lane. He guest-starred in television programs including Cheers, Hardcastle and McCormick, Dynasty, Trapper John, M.D., The Greatest American Hero and The Golden Girls, and also in films such as The Last of the Finest, Jack Reed: A Search for Justice, The Memory Thief, F/X and Crimewave.
