= Murphy's Mob =

- Murphy's Mob opening titles
- Created by: Brian Finch
- Starring: Ken Hutchison; Lynda Bellingham
- Country of origin: United Kingdom
- Original language: English
- No. of episodes: 54

Production
- Running time: 25 min (per episode)

Original release
- Network: ITV
- Release: 1 March 1982 – 19 December 1985

Murphy's Mob is a British children's television series, created and written by Brian Finch which was produced and directed by David Foster for Central Independent Television, and screened in the UK on ITV for four series between 1 March 1982 and 19 December 1985. The theme tune was sung by Gary Holton, of Auf Wiedersehen, Pet fame.

== Plot ==
The series featured Ken Hutchison as Mac Murphy, who takes charge as manager of a struggling fictional Fourth Division football club, Dunmore United, and a group of young supporters of the club whose day-to-day troubles included attempts to set up a junior supporter's club and clubhouse within the stadium.

== Cast ==
- Ken Hutchison as Mac Murphy
- Lynda Bellingham as Elaine Murphy
- Terence Budd as Rasputin Jones
- Milton Johns as Derek Cassidy
- Amanda Mealing as Sheila
- Tracy Lynn Stephens as Jean
- Keith Jayne as Boxer
- Lewis Stevens as Wurzel
- Chris Gascoyne as Judd
- Wayne Norman as Gerry 'Geronimo'

== Production ==
The drama scenes also included action taken from real Watford games from the era. The fictional Dunmore team therefore played in yellow, red and black to allow the footage to be cut into the drama. Billy Wright, the former England captain is credited in the first series as "Soccer Advisor".

== Broadcast ==
The show was broadcast twice weekly on ITV

Series 1

- 16 episodes generally broadcast on Monday and Wednesday between 1 March and 26 April 1982

Series 2

- 12 episodes generally broadcast on Wednesday and Thursday between 9 March and 14 April 1983

Series 3

- 14 episodes generally broadcast on Monday and Thursday between 29 October and 13 December 1984

Series 4

- 12 episodes generally broadcast on Monday and Thursday between 11 November and 20 December 1985
