= David Starkey (poet) =

American poet

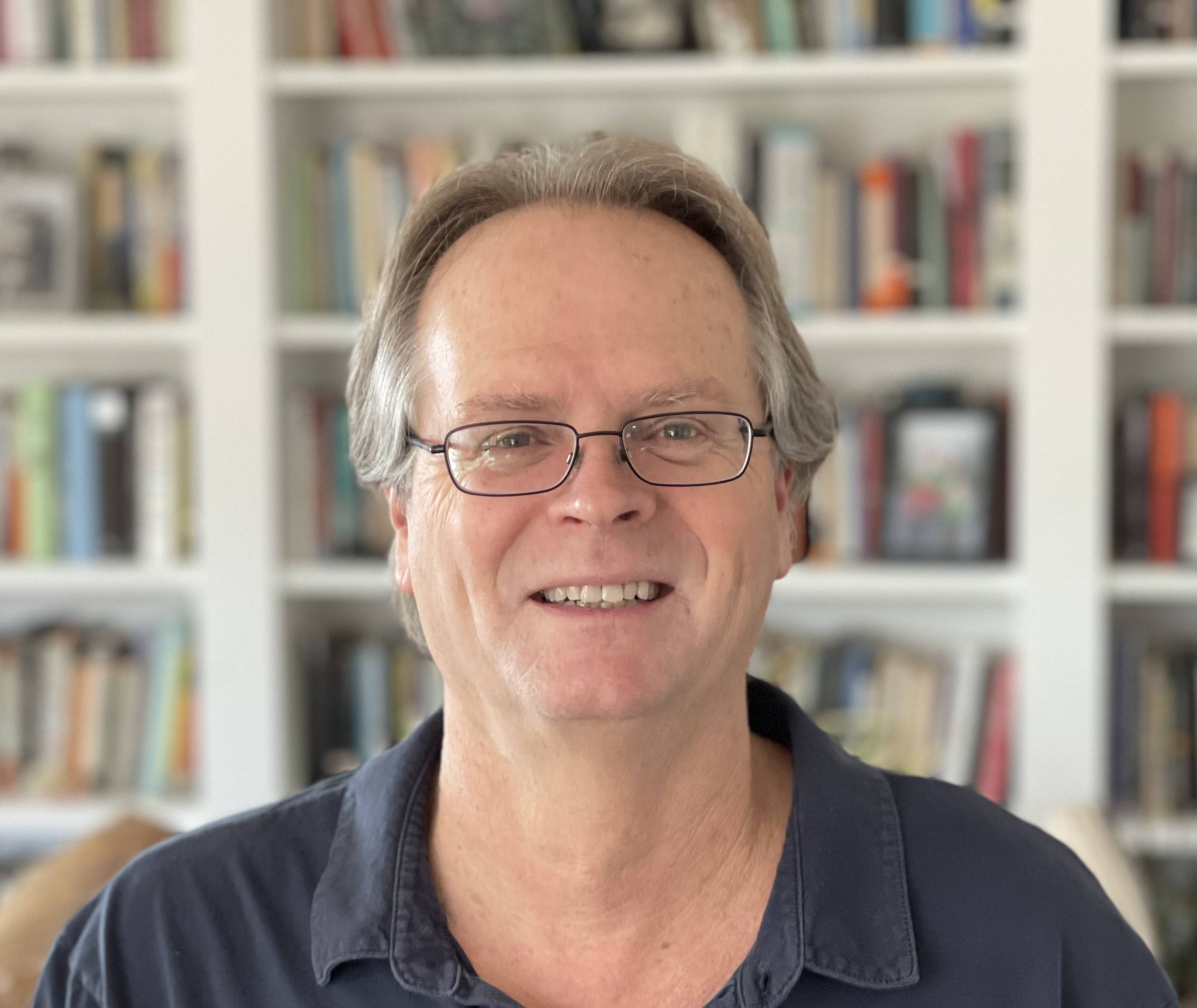
David Starkey

David Starkey (born June 28, 1962) is an American poet and academic, and former poet laureate of Santa Barbara, California.

== Early life ==
David Starkey was born in Sacramento, California, in 1962 to Frank and Margaret Starkey. He lives in Santa Barbara, California with his wife, Sandy. He was educated at the University of California, Davis (BA, 1984); the University of California, Los Angeles (MA, 1986); and Louisiana State University (MFA, 1990).

== Career ==
Starkey is a professor of English at Santa Barbara City College, where he directs the creative writing program. Prior to teaching at SBCC, he was an assistant professor at Francis Marion University and associate professor at North Central College. He was a Fulbright-Hays Scholar in India in 1994 and a Senior Fulbright Scholar at the University of Oulu, Finland in 1999.

Starkey has published more than 500 poems in literary magazines and has authored eleven books of poetry, authored or co-authored five textbooks, and edited or co-edited six anthologies. He is also a book reviewer for the Santa Barbara Independent. He served as Santa Barbara's third poet laureate, from 2009-2011, has been featured on Garrison Keillor’s The Writer’s Almanac, and is the publisher and co-editor of Gunpowder Press, a Santa Barbara-based small press that specializes in the publication of poetry.

Writing in The Georgia Review, Paul Zimmer praised Starkey’s “wonderful language” and “amazing lines,” concluding, “Starkey is an entertaining and resourceful poet.” Of Like a Soprano, Starkey's poetry collection based on The Sopranos TV series, cast member Michael Imperioli, who played Christopher Moltisanti, called the “episode by episode distillation of the series…potent, loving and inspired.” Critic Arthur Kayzakian noted in Poetry International that the book “never misses a dark heartbeat” allowing the reader “to delve deeper into the psyche of Tony Soprano.”

Reviewing Living Blue in the Red States, an anthology of essays exploring the divide between the red states and blue states, Andy Fogle wrote in PopMatters that the book “reveals the sensitivity, openness, and respect which the best (blue or red) minds can offer. I think that there are at least a couple of essays that strident Republicans would appreciate and, perhaps more importantly, those same essays might teach some Democrats a thing or two about temperance and true tolerance.” Booklist noted that Living Blue in the Red States contributors display “passion for their regions and elegance in expressing their anger, frustration, and longing to close—or at least understand—the political divide.”

Perhaps best known for his popular textbook Creative Writing: Four Genres in Brief, Starkey's pedagogy is based on collaborations with the late Wendy Bishop, which focused on employing composition studies to aid in the teaching of creative writing. In an article in College Composition and Communication entitled “The Place of Composition in Creative Writing Studies,” Doug Hesse identifies Starkey as a writer-teacher working “at the fringe of both fields—perhaps tolerantly or even compellingly so.”

== Bibliography ==
=== Poetry ===
- Open Mike Night at the Cabaret Voltaire (1996)
- Ways of Being Dead (2006)
- Adventures of the Minor Poet (2007)
- Starkey's Book of States (2008)
- A Few Things You Should Know About the Weasel (2010)
- It Must Be Like the World (2011)
- Circus Maximus (2013)
- Like a Soprano (2014)
- Dance, You Monster, to My Soft Song (2021)
- What Just Happened: 210 Haiku Against the Trump Presidency (2021)
- Cutting It Loose (2022)

=== Textbooks ===
- Poetry Writing: Theme and Variations (1999)
- Keywords in Creative Writing (2006), with Wendy Bishop
- Creative Writing: An Introduction to Poetry and Fiction (2013)
- Academic Writing Now: A Brief Guide for Busy Students (2015)
- Creative Writing: Four Genres in Brief (2008; 2013; 2017; 2021)
- Hello, Writer (2021)

=== Anthologies ===
- Teaching Writing Creatively (1998)
- Smokestacks and Skyscrapers (1999), with Richard Guzman
- In Praise of Pedagogy (2000), with Wendy Bishop
- Genre by Example: Writing What We Teach (2001)
- In a Fine Frenzy: Poets Respond to Shakespeare (2005), with Paul Willis
- Living Blue in the Red States (2007)
- What Breathes Us: Santa Barbara Poets Laureate 2005-2015
- To Give Life a Shape: Poems Inspired by the Santa Barbara Museum of Art (2017), with Chryss Yost
- Out of the Ground: Poems Inspired by Santa Barbara Botanic Garden (2024), with Chryss Yost
