= Just Another Saturday =

- Play for Today episode
- Poster featuring Jon Morrison
- Episode no.: Series 5 Episode 15
- Directed by: John Mackenzie
- Written by: Peter McDougall
- Original air date: 13 March 1975

Episode chronology
← Previous "Goodbye"	Next → "Child of Hope"

"Just Another Saturday" is the 15th episode of fifth season of the British BBC anthology TV series Play for Today. The episode was a television play that was originally broadcast on 13 March 1975. "Just Another Saturday" was written by Peter McDougall, directed by John Mackenzie, produced by Graeme MacDonald, and starred Jon Morrison and Billy Connolly.

"Just Another Saturday" is about the Orange walk culture. The episode won the Prix Italia for Best Drama.

== Synopsis ==
John looks forward with nervous excitement to the annual Orange order march in Glasgow, in which he will lead his local Orange Lodge band as mace-swinger. However, as the day progresses he begins to become disillusioned with the day and his colleagues, as he witnesses their growing drunkenness and unwarranted violence against Catholic homes on the march's route. Events of the day lead him to question his involvement with the band, which also threatens his own safety.

== Cast ==
- Jon Morrison as John
- Eileen McCallum as Lizzie
- Bill Henderson as Dan
- Ken Hutchison as Rab
- Billy Connolly as Paddy
- Jim Gibb as Jim
- Phil McCall as Joe
- Jake D'Arcy as Jackie
- James Walsh as Tommy
- Martin Black as Man in Fight

== Critical reception ==
The BFI's Screenonline website comments: "Beyond the political issues, it is McDougall's mastery not only of the gallows humour of Glasgow's working class but of the hidden motives of parental kindness that make the drama, in Jeremy Isaacs's words, 'a masterpiece' and won the play the Prix Italia."
