= Peter McDougall =

Scottish television playwright (born 1947)

Peter McDougall (born 1947, Greenock, Scotland) is a Scottish television playwright whose major success was in the 1970s.

McDougall claims to have had very little schooling and to rarely read books. He began his working life at the age of fourteen in the shipyards of Greater Glasgow and Greenock with future comedian and actor Billy Connolly. Depressed by the harsh conditions and unfulfilled by the menial work, he left Scotland and moved to London, where he worked as a house-painter.

It was while painting Colin Welland's house that McDougall impressed the actor and writer when relating tales of being the drum major in the Orange walk as a teenager. He was advised to try writing a television play about this and the result was Just Another Saturday, which McDougall wrote in secret and hid even from his first wife, a teacher nearly a decade his senior. Once completed, the script was sent to the BBC Play for Today team, who were enormously impressed but rejected the play because of the sensitive subject matter. McDougall was however asked to try again, and wrote a more intimate piece Just Your Luck (1972) based on his sister's wedding, again exploring the sectarian divide in its story of a Protestant girl who finds herself pregnant by a Catholic boy.

The play caused a furore in Scotland, many people appalled by its portrayal of the people's earthiness and prejudice. However, there was much positive praise too, one viewer even going so far as to say it was "the most exciting debut since Look Back in Anger."

At that point, the director John Mackenzie began enquiring after the script of Just Another Saturday and managed to get the play into production, only to then find the piece banned after the head of the Glasgow police said that the script would cause "bloodshed on the streets in the making and in the showing". After a year Mackenzie managed to persuade the Head of BBC Television Alasdair Milne to press ahead with the play, although some scenes were eventually filmed in Edinburgh to minimise controversy.

The finished film, the script of which was barely changed from the first draft, won massive acclaim on its first transmission in 1975, gained several repeats, and won its author the Prix Italia. McDougall followed this success up with a short kitchen comedy for BBC2, A Wily Couple (1976), part of the Centre Play series and another Play for Today, The Elephants' Graveyard (1976). During this time McDougall got the opportunity to work with talented and influential producers such as Graeme Macdonald, who later became overall Head Of Drama at the BBC in the 1980s.

Several other television projects ensued, including an aborted sitcom, until McDougall and Mackenzie collaborated again on their final Play for Today, Just a Boys' Game (1979). Starring blues singer Frankie Miller this was the story of Greenock razor gangs and specifically of one man's life of alcohol and violence over a twenty-four-hour period. His most violent piece, Just A Boy's Game the film was also notable for supporting performances from a then unknown Gregor Fisher, Ken Hutchison, comedian Hector Nicol and Jean Taylor Smith. Martin Scorsese has since stated that the bar room brawl scene and its bleak moody atmosphere made the film the Scottish equivalent of Mean Streets. McDougall also wrote the BBC supernatural drama Tarry-Dan Tarry-Dan Scarey Old Spooky Man set in Cornwall about a troubled teenager experiencing dreams of an ancient family curse. Only broadcast once in May 1978 and directed by John Reardon. Mackenzie and McDougall's last collaboration was on the STV film A Sense of Freedom (also 1979), based on the autobiography of Glaswegian gangster Jimmy Boyle, detailing his crimes and subsequent reform.

McDougall's subsequent plays Shoot For The Sun (1986), a bleak BBC drama starring Jimmy Nail and Brian Cox about Edinburgh's heroin problem, and Down Where the Buffalo Go (1988) starring Harvey Keitel, and Down Among The Big Boys (1993) did not meet with as significant critical acclaim. However he has remained good friends since with Keitel, who played the lead in Down Where the Buffalo Go. Keitel was caught wearing a “Get Me Peter” T-shirt during the filming of Down Where the Buffalo Go in a declaration of disillusionment with the director Ian Knox, and his bond with McDougall.

In 1994, McDougall was caught remarking upon the appointment of BBC's new Head of Drama, future Last King Of Scotland producer Andrea Calderwood, that the BBC should never had given the job to a "wee lassie". The two later made up and Calderwood was later invited round McDougall's for dinner, with Billy Connolly and Brian Cox present.

McDougall was assaulted in Glasgow's West End in 1995, with an assailant brandishing a knife whilst walking home with his son. He was stabbed above the eye and taken to the Western Infirmary, where his wounds required more than 20 stitches.

In 2004, McDougall wrote three short dramas for the stage, starring - amongst others - Robbie Coltrane and Sean Scanlan, which were presented at the Òran Mór in Glasgow as part of the lunchtime theatre event A Play, A Pie and A Pint. He was at this point working on remakes of the Ealing films The Maggie and Whisky Galore but spoke out furiously when his proposed casting of Robbie Coltrane and Robert Carlyle was passed on in favour of English actors. A company, Whiskey Galore Films, was established which included producer Stephen Evans to develop Whisky Galore.

In October 2007, a DVD boxed set featuring most of McDougall's work, "The Peter McDougall Collection" was released by John Williams Productions. This collection featured three Play for Today titles: Just Another Saturday, The Elephant's Graveyard, Just A Boy's Game, and a Screen One drama: Down Among the Big Boys.

McDougall was finally awarded with a BAFTA in 2008 when he received a lifetime achievement award - for "Outstanding contribution to Scottish broadcasting". A retrospective multiple screening of John Mackenzie and McDougall's collaborations was also shown at the Edinburgh International Festival in 2009.

McDougall was also one of a number of prominent Scots who attended the 2010 funeral of Trade Union Leader Jimmy Reid.

As of 2011, McDougall has written a screenplay adaptation of the James Hogg novel The Private Memoirs and Confessions of a Justified Sinner, which has garnered interest from long-time friends Billy Connolly and Robbie Coltrane as well as Kelly Macdonald. The script is currently being viewed by Robert Pattinson and would lead to a remarkable comeback if taken into development.

Scottish filmmaker Eleanor Yule has also made a documentary for the BBC "Late Show" on the work of McDougall.

McDougall currently lives in the West End of Glasgow with his partner, acclaimed director and writer Morag Fullarton, and often can be seen frequenting the Òran Mór theatre pub in the West of Glasgow.
