= The Other Man (Play of the Week) =

- Play of the Week episode
- Episode no.: Series 10; Episode 1
- Directed by: Gordon Flemyng
- Written by: Giles Cooper
- Original air date: 7 September 1964

The Other Man is a British television drama written by Giles Cooper, directed by Gordon Flemyng, and starring Michael Caine, Siân Phillips and John Thaw. It was made by Granada for the ITV network, and broadcast on 7 September 1964.

== Production ==
Prior to transmission, the nature of the storyline was not publicised, the only hint being the cover of that week's TV Times, which showed the image of a British passport, but with the addition of a Swastika and the German phrase "Deutsches Reich." Running in two parts from 20:00 to 20:50 and 21:05 to 22:35, with a news broadcast in between, The Other Man was at the time the longest single drama broadcast by ITV. It had a cast of over 200, including extras and 60 speaking parts.

== Synopsis ==
During the opening of a British army regimental museum, one person present mentally speculates on what might have happened had past events taken a different course. This alternative history follows the life of George Grant (Michael Caine), a young army officer, as Britain capitulates to Germany in 1940 to avoid bombing. There follows a Nazi-directed reorganisation of Britain's domestic and foreign policy, a brutal reconquest of India, and a gradual complicity in racial atrocities and the building of a Channel tunnel using slave labour.

Remaining a professional soldier, Grant gradually but inevitably compromises himself under the new regime, via three tests of his humanity, after accepting a posting connected to building a road from India to the Russian frontier. First he is confronted with an old friend in a Jewish working party; then he must try and execute a fellow officer for Communist treason; before finally having to denounce his former superior officer. Grant's seeking of emotional solace with a prostitute is interrupted by a Cossack attack, during which he tries to get himself killed.

He regains consciousness a year later and discovers that his shattered body has been rebuilt using the same advanced transplant surgery that is used to keep alive the leading Nazis – including Adolf Hitler – and "heroes of the Reich" like Grant himself. Rebuilt with a new leg, a new arm, new internal organs, and a new eye, he is told that the parts came from live "donors". The narrative closes with both the "real" Grant and his Nazi-serving alter ego delivering essentially the same speech about "why we are here today" at the ceremony first seen at the beginning of the play.

== Cast ==
- Michael Caine as George Grant
- Siân Phillips as Kate Grant
- John Thaw as Henry Potter
- Peter Dyneley as Major Ritter
- Nigel Green as Company Sergeant Major Blackman
- William Kendall as Major Norriss
- Godfrey Quigley as Paddy Ryan
- Vladek Sheybal as Klaus
- Maurice Quick as Major Weston
- Dennis Chinnery as Major Lewin

== Production notes ==
Writer Giles Cooper had himself served as a British army officer with the West Yorkshire Regiment in Burma during the Second World War. He subsequently adapted The Other Man as a novel.

The complete programme is not thought to exist, although some sequences have survived.

== See also ==
- Axis victory in World War II
