= Down Where the Buffalo Go =

- Directed by: Ian Knox
- Written by: Peter McDougall
- Produced by: Andy Park
- Starring: Harvey Keitel; Andrew Byatt; Stella Gonet; Katherine Stark
- Release date: 19 January 1988
- Running time: 90 minutes
- Country: United Kingdom
- Language: English

Down Where the Buffalo Go is a 1988 film made for television by BBC Scotland for The Play on One. It stars Harvey Keitel. It was written by Peter McDougall and directed by Ian Knox.

== Synopsis ==
Carl is a US Navy Shore patrol officer (played by Keitel) who is based at the Holy Loch naval base in Scotland. Armed only with a nightstick, his primary function is to ensure that sailors on shore leave do not become too rowdy, and to provide help to sailors in need of assistance. Carl is married to a local girl and their relationship is at breaking point – she wants to leave Scotland and settle in America while he wants to remain in Scotland. With his brother-in-law Willie, who is already estranged from his wife and under threat of redundancy from his shipyard job, the two men forge a friendship to help each other through.

Set around the Holy Loch US Navy base, the film was made in the towns of Dunoon and Greenock.
