= Special Delivery (1976 film) =

1976 film by Paul Wendkos

- Directed by: Paul Wendkos
- Written by: John Melson; James Edward Grant
- Produced by: Richard Berg
- Starring: Bo Svenson; Cybill Shepherd
- Cinematography: Harry Stradling Jr.
- Edited by: Houseley Stevenson Jr.
- Music by: Lalo Schifrin
- Production company: BCP
- Distributed by: American International Pictures (US); AVCO Embassy Pictures (International)
- Release date: July 1976
- Running time: 99 minutes
- Country: United States
- Language: English

Special Delivery is a 1976 American neo-noir comedy crime film directed by Paul Wendkos and starring Bo Svenson and Cybill Shepherd.

== Plot ==
A gang of thieves plan a daring bank robbery, making their escape across the rooftops of Los Angeles. The police are quickly called in, however, and only one of the robbers, Murdock, makes a clean getaway. Unfortunately, in order to do so, he is forced to dump the stolen cash into a mailbox, which he then finds is locked until midnight, forcing him to wait until the mailman makes his late night pickup. As he waits, he discovers that his hiding place has been observed by several other people, all of whom want a share of the loot.

== Cast ==
- Bo Svenson as Jack Murdock
- Cybill Shepherd as Mary Jane Pierce
- Jeff Goldblum as biker Snake
- Tom Atkins as Zabelski
- Sorrell Booke as Hubert Zane
- Gerrit Graham as Swivot
- Michael C. Gwynne as Graff
- Otto as himself

== Reception ==
Vincent Canby of The New York Times was not amused: "Michael C. Gwynne has some good moments as a junkie, but neither Paul Wendkos, who directed the film, nor Don Gazzaniga, who wrote it, is very adept at melodrama and action. The film ends in a car chase of the sort that makes you realize that the screeching of tires has become the most overused and boring sound in movies today."
