= Hunter's Blood =

1986 film by Robert C. Hughes

- Theatrical poster
- Directed by: Robert C. Hughes
- Written by: Emmett Alston
- Based on: Hunter's Blood by Jere Cunningham
- Produced by: Myrl A. Schreibman
- Starring: Sam Bottoms; Clu Gulager; Mayf Nutter; Ken Swofford; Joey Travolta; Kim Delaney
- Cinematography: Thomas F. Denove
- Edited by: Barry Zetlin
- Music by: John D'Andrea
- Production company: Cineventure
- Distributed by: Concorde Pictures
- Release dates: September 26, 1986 (United Kingdom); May 29, 1987 (United States)
- Running time: 101 minutes
- Country: United States
- Language: English

Hunter's Blood is a 1986 American action thriller film directed by Robert C. Hughes in his feature directorial debut. Written by Emmett Alston, it is based on the 1977 novel of the same name by Jere Cunningham. It stars Sam Bottoms, Clu Gulager, Mayf Nutter, Ken Swofford, Joey Travolta, and Kim Delaney. It follows a group of city dwellers who go deer hunting in Arkansas and meet crazed poachers seeing them as prey. The film also marks the acting debut of Billy Bob Thornton, who portrays a local hillbilly.

The film was given a limited theatrical release in the United States on May 29, 1987, by Concorde Pictures. It received mixed-to-positive reviews from critics. For his performance, Gulager was nominated for the Saturn Award for Best Supporting Actor.

== Plot ==
Five men from the city decide to take a little trip to the woods and have some fun and hunting. Things get complicated later on when they encounter a pack of maniacal deer hunters who turn them in to prey.

== Cast ==
- Sam Bottoms as David Rand
- Kim Delaney as Melanie
- Clu Gulager as Mason Rand
- Ken Swofford as Al Coleman
- Joey Travolta as Marty Adler
- Mayf Nutter as Ralph Coleman
- Lee de Broux as Red Beard
- Bruce Glover as One Eye
- Billy Drago as Snake
- Mickey Jones as Wash Pot
- Charles Cyphers as Woody
- Bryan Rasmussen as Purty Boy
- Joe Verroca as Ants
- David DeShay as Tull
- Mike Muscat as Bubba
- Connie Danese as Tracy
- Gene Glazer as Harris
- Ray Young as Brinkley
- Ron LaPere as Tobe
- Billy Bob Thornton as Billy Bob
- Beverly E. Schwartz as Ol Maw

== Production ==
Hunter's Blood was produced by Cineventure Inc., a division of the Florida-based Independent Entertainment Corp. (IEC). Principal photography began on March 7, 1986. The film was shot in the woods around Newhall, Santa Clarita, California.

== Release ==
Hunter's Blood was released in the United Kingdom on September 26, 1986, by Palace Pictures. The film had its American premiere at the 167th Street Theater in North Miami, Florida on January 23, 1987. Shortly after, Concorde Pictures acquired distribution rights to the film. It was released in New York City and Los Angeles on May 29, 1987.

== Reception ==
=== Critical response ===
Michael Wilmington of the Los Angeles Times called the film "a low-budget Deliverance-derived rural thriller, basted with Southern Comfort." Wilmington stated, "The photography may be a bit muddy, but Robert C. Hughes' direction is coherent and well paced. The script is tight and the dialogue isn't idiotic — except where it's supposed to be. Some of the actors are fine. The movie holds your interest without rewarding it, though it's sometimes an interesting critique of machismo, laced with dark humor."

Scott Drebit of Daily Dead described the film as "a backwoods hicksploitation actioner that more than gets by with a cast handpicked by the B movie gods and a script wittier than it has to be." Drebit also wrote, "Hunter's Blood very much deserves to sit on a shelf next to Rituals and Just Before Dawn as a stellar backwoods horror; the ending alone has a delicious punchline (pun intended) that every horror fan will love."

=== Accolades ===
Year	Award	Category	Nominee	Result
1987	14th Saturn Awards	Best Supporting Actor	Clu Gulager	Nominated
