= Clive Wood =

English actor (born 1954)

Clive Wood (born 8 May 1954) is a British actor, known for his television roles in Press Gang (1989–93), The Bill (1990), London's Burning (1996–99), and as King Henry I in The Pillars of the Earth (2010). His stage roles include playing Stephano in The Tempest at Shakespeare's Globe (2011) and Antony in Antony and Cleopatra at the Haymarket (2014). His film appearances include The Innocent (1985), Buster (1988) and Suffragette (2015).

== Career ==
=== Games ===
Wood voices "The Pirate Lord" from the popular video game Sea of Thieves from Rare. He voiced James Crawford in the game Homefront: The Revolution.

=== Film and television ===
Born in Croydon, Surrey, Wood's first starring TV role was as Vic Brown, opposite Joanne Whalley and Susan Penhaligon, in the 1982 ITV drama series based on the novel A Kind of Loving. He has played Matt Kerr in Press Gang, DCI Gordon Wray in The Bill and Jack Morgan in London's Burning. He also played Captain Smollett in the 1990 TV film Treasure Island (having previously played Dick in the 1977 BBC version). He has also appeared in a cameo as an Auton masquerading as a Roman commander in the Doctor Who episode "The Pandorica Opens".

Wood played the role of Blair in Mr. Palfrey of Westminster (1984–85), and Stephen Richford in an episode of the television series A Touch of Frost, "Dancing in the Dark" (2004). In 2011, he played Jack Gillespie in Series 2 of Land Girls. He was also in the television series Midsomer Murders, playing the role of Dr. Clive Warnford in the episode "Blue Herrings" (2000), Geoffrey Larkin in the episode "Secrets and Spies" (2009), and again in 2014, playing Johnny Linklater in the episode "Wild Harvest".

=== Theatre ===
In 2006, Wood reprised his roles from the 2001 RSC productions of Henry VI Parts I, II and III, which included that of the Duke of York, whose death led to the Wars of the Roses. The ensemble went on to perform Shakespeare's two histories cycles, culminating in early 2008 with The Glorious Moment – a chance to see all eight plays in succession.

He played Squadron Leader Swanson in the 2011 revival of Terence Rattigan's Second World War drama Flare Path at the Theatre Royal, Haymarket directed by Trevor Nunn. He next joined the cast of Nunn's production of The Tempest as Stephano, playing at the Haymarket from August to October 2011.

In 2014, Clive played Antony in Antony and Cleopatra at Shakespeare's Globe. The play, directed by Jonathan Munby, with Eve Best as Cleopatra, Jolyon Coy as Octavius Caesar and Phil Daniels as Enobarbus, ran from 17 May until 24 August 2014.

== Filmography ==
Year	Title	Role	Notes
Film
1985	The Innocent	Turner	
1987	Pretorius	Inspector Andries Pretorius	
1987	Dog Tags	Cecil	
1988	Buster	Sergeant Chalmers	
1992	The Hummingbird Tree	Tom Ross	
2005	Red Mercury	John	
2011	Salmon Fishing in the Yemen	Tom Price-Williams	
2015	Suffragette	Supt. James Burrill	
2016	Theó Complete Walk: Antony and Cleopatra	Antony	Short film
2017	All the Money in the World	Bullimore	
Television
1976	Gangsters	Drug Addict on Video	Episode: "Incident Four"
1977	Treasure Island	Dirk	2 episodes
1979	The Knowledge	Ginger	TV film
1982	A Kind of Loving	Vic Brown	10 episodes
1984–85	Mr. Palfrey of Westminster	Blair	10 episodes
1985	Honeymoon	Tim	TV film
1987	Love After Lunch	Rod	TV film
1988	A Very Peculiar Practice	Freddy Frith	Episode: "Bad Vibrations"
1988	The Ruth Rendell Mysteries	Tony Jasper	Episode: "No Crying He Makes"
1989–93	Press Gang	Matt Kerr	14 episodes
1989	Capstick's Law	Roger Maitland	1 episode
1989	Storyboard	Blair	Episode: "A Question of Commitment"
1990	Treasure Island	Captain Smollett	TV film
1990	The Bill	D.C.I. Wray	28 episodes
1990	Stay Lucky	Simon Thorn	Episode: "Burning Your Boats"
1991	Soldier Soldier	Keith Hart	Episode: "Flying Colours"
1991	The Crucifer of Blood	Jonathan Small	TV film
1993	Screen Two	Bernard	Episode "Dead Romantic"
1993	The Good Guys	Robert Goddard	Episode: "All For Love"
1993	Glóbusz	Ron Anderson	5 episodes
1996–99	London's Burning	Jack Morgan	49 episodes
2000	Midsomer Murders	Dr. Clive Warnford	Episode: "Blue Herrings"
2000	Holby City	Niall Duggan	Episode: "Too Much Too Young"
2001–02	At Home with the Braithwaites	Tony	2 episodes
2003	Death in Holy Orders	Archdeacon Matthew Crampton	2 episodes
2003	The Lion in Winter	William Marshall	TV film
2004	Dunkirk	Lt Gen Henry Pownall	Docudrama
2004	A Touch of Frost	Stephen Richford	Episode: "Dancing in the Dark"
2004	Waking the Dead	Neil Clayton	Episode: “In the Sight of the Lord” (2 parts)
2006	Eleventh Hour	Peter Gifford	Episode: "Resurrection"
2007	Bonkers	Colin Waldow	2 episodes
2009	Minder	Felix Cornell	Episode: "Thank You Lucky Stars"
2009	Midsomer Murders	Geoffrey Larkin	Episode: "Secrets and Spies"
2009	Casualty	Tweedie	2 episodes
2010	Doctor Who	Roman Commander	Episode: "The Pandorica Opens"
2010	The Pillars of the Earth	King Henry I	8 episodes
2011	Land Girls	Jack Gillespie	5 episodes
2011	Waking the Dead	Carney	Episode: "Conviction" (2 parts)
2011	Without You	David Shaw	2 episodes
2013	The Bible	Nathan	Episode: "Kingdom"
2013	Endeavour	Vic Kasper	Episode: "Home"
2013	Holby City	DCI Malcolm Green	3 episodes
2014	Utopia	Dr. Isherwood	1 episode
2014	Midsomer Murders	Johnny Linklater	Episode: "Wild Harvest"
2015	New Tricks	Kevin Dodds	1 episode
2016	Casualty	Tom Cheney	Episode: "The Fear"
2017	In the Dark	Robert Weeks	3 episodes
2018–20	Casualty	Bill Crothers	6 episodes
2018	Father Brown	Inspector George Ironside	Episode: "The Devil You Know"
2020	Silent Witness	Paul Simmons	Episode: "Hope" (2 parts)
