= Just a Boys' Game =

- Play for Today episode
- Episode no.: Series 10; Episode 1
- Directed by: John Mackenzie
- Written by: Peter McDougall
- Cinematography by: Elmer Cossey
- Editing by: Graham Walker
- Original air date: 8 November 1979
- Running time: 71 minutes

Starring
- Frankie Miller as Jake McQuillen; Hector Nicol as Granda

"Just a Boys' Game" is an episode of Play for Today written by Peter McDougall and directed by John Mackenzie. "Just a Boys' Game" aired on 8 November 1979.

It features Frankie Miller, Gregor Fisher, Ken Hutchison, Hector Nicol, Jean Taylor Smith, Katherine Stark, Barry Malone, Michael Malone and band The Cuban Heels.

The plot revolves around the life of Jake McQuillan, who lives in the shadow of his dying grandfather, who used to be Greenock's hardest man.

The play was filmed in and around Greenock and Port Glasgow.

Frankie Miller's song "Rules of the Game" is featured over the closing credits.

== Cast ==
- Jake McQuillen - Frankie Miller
- Dancer Dunnichy - Ken Hutchison
- Grannie - Jean Taylor-Smith
- Granda - Hector Nicol
- Tanza - Gregor Fisher
- Jane - Katherine Stark
- Bella - Jan Wilson
- Mental Dan - Jim Byars
- At the pub - Gaylie Runciman, James Morrison, Bill Riddock, Sandy West, Irene Sunters, Martin Cochrane, Elaine Collins, Freddie Boardley
- Young Team Boys - Billy Greenleas, Michael Malone, Hamish Taylor, Eddie Kane, David Fulton, Billy Faulds, Douglas Sannachan, Andrew Burns, Jimmy Fisher
- Group in Pub - The Cuban Heels
- Outside the Pub - James Kennedy, Myra Forsyth, David Voss, Peter Davidson
- Couple in Close - Katy Gardiner, Jimmy Martin
- Woman in Grocer's - Mairhi Russel
- At the Shipyard - Jackie Farrell, Campbell Morrison, John Butterly, Ken Henderson, James Boyce
- At Bella's Close - Barry Malone, Billy Jeffrey, John Murtagh, Johnny Adam
- Man at Snooker Hall - Ray Jeffries
- At the Garage - Eileen McCallum, David Anderson
- Jake's Family - Shenagh Douglas, Ivy Val, Ron Paterson

== Critical reception ==
Screenonline wrote "stunningly photographed by Elmer Cossey and featured McDougall's most crackling dialogue and richest characterisations, all brilliantly evoked by a cast headed by blues singer Frankie Miller in a performance that melts the camera in its intensity."
