= Jere Cunningham =

American novelist and screenwriter (1943–2018)

- Born: Jere Pearson Cunningham Jr. December 22, 1943; Memphis, Tennessee, USA
- Died: January 23, 2018 (aged 74); Shoals, North Carolina
- Other name: Jeremiah Pearson
- Occupations: Author, Screenwriter

Jere Cunningham (born Jere Pearson Cunningham Jr.; 20 December 1943 – 23 January 2018) was an American novelist and screenwriter.

== Works ==
=== Novels ===
- Hunter's Blood (1977)
- The Legacy (1977)
- The Visitor (1978)
- The Abyss (1981)
- Love Object (1984)
- Die Täuferin (Brethren) (2013) as Jeremiah Pearson
- Die Ketzer (Villens) (2013) as Jeremiah Pearson.
- Der Bauernkrieger (Ausbund) (2013) as Jeremiah Pearson.

=== Short stories ===
- The Face (1981) - Modern Masters of Horror (1981).
- The Red-Eyed Thing (1982) - Rod Serling's The Twilight Zone Magazine, September 1982.
- Fire (1984) - Omni, April 1984.
- The Pool of Manhead Song (1984) - Isaac Asimov's Science Fiction Magazine, June 1984.
- Decoys (1984) - Shadows 7 (1984).

=== Produced Screenplays ===
- Hunter's Blood (1986) - Based on Cunningham's novel.
- The Last of the Finest (1990) - Co-Wrote Screenplay with Thomas Lee Wright and George Armitage.
- Judgment Night (1993) - Co-Wrote Story with Lewis Colick.
- Boss of Bosses (2001) - Based on the book by Joseph F. O'Brien and Andris Kurins.
- The Big Heist (2001) - Co-Wrote Screenplay with Gary Hoffman. Based on the book by Ernest Volkman and John Cummings.
- Second String (2002) - Co-Wrote Story with Tom Flynn.

=== Unproduced Screenplays ===
Year	Title	Description	Ref.
1986–87	Isobar	A script written for Joel Silver, Lawrence Gordon, and John Davis, which tells the story of "a mutant professional fighter in a future world, on a quest to discover the truth of his origins." Arnold Schwarzenegger was interested in playing the role, but his asking price proved too rich for the studio, so Schwarzenegger instead signed on to star in Total Recall. A few years later Silver contacted Cunningham about wanting to use the title for another project that he was developing.	
1989	Flamingo	A script about the relationship between Bugsy Siegel and his mistress, Virginia Hill that would’ve been produced by Joel Silver and 20th Century Fox.	
1989	Centurion	An original script, described as a "Predator"-like action tale where elite army robots hunt down a special forces squad, that Cunningham would’ve directed for New Line Cinema.	
1993	Shiva	A script Cunningham had written and was going to produce in partnership with Interscope Communications and Touchstone Pictures, Jonathan Hensleigh was going to rewrite the script alongside Chuck Russell, who was slated to direct.	
1993	Crockett and Bowie	A script co-written with Crash Leland about Davy Crockett’s life and relationship with Jim Bowie, the script was to be produced by Warner Bros. Pictures and Interscope Communications.	
1998	Rockwood	A military-political drama based on the real-life story of Lawrence Rockwood. It was to have been produced by Brian Grazer for Imagine Entertainment and Universal Pictures, and would’ve been directed by Lee Tamahori.	
