= Mr. Palfrey of Westminster =

1984-5 British tv drama

- Genre: Spy drama
- Written by: George Markstein; Philip Broadley; Michael Chapman; Anthony Skene; Barry Appleton
- Directed by: Gerald Blake; Christopher Hodson; Peter Cregeen; John Davies
- Starring: Alec McCowen; Clive Wood; Caroline Blakiston; Briony McRoberts
- Country of origin: United Kingdom
- Original language: English
- No. of series: 2
- No. of episodes: 10

Production
- Executive producer: Lloyd Shirley
- Producer: Michael Chapman
- Running time: 50 minutes
- Production company: Thames Television

Original release
- Network: ITV
- Release: 18 April 1984 – 11 June 1985

Mr. Palfrey of Westminster is a British television drama produced by Thames Television for ITV.

It started with "The Traitor", a television play aired as part of Thames Television's Storyboard anthology series in 1983, featuring Alec McCowen as Palfrey.

This was followed by two weekly series in 1984 and 1985, in the 9-10pm timeslot, again with Alec McCowen as Palfrey, and introducing Clive Wood as his assistant Blair.

This was followed by another Storyboard television play, "A Question of Commitment", in 1989, featuring Clive Wood as Blair.

== Plot summary ==
Mr Palfrey is a mild, middle-aged man—the epitome of a middle-ranking British civil servant. He works in counter-intelligence—identifying and neutralizing foreign spies, traitors, and double agents operating within the UK.

== Cast ==
=== Regular cast and characters ===
- Alec McCowen as Mr Palfrey, the lead character, a Whitehall-based spycatcher
- Briony McRoberts as Caroline, Palfrey's secretary
- Clive Wood as Blair, Palfrey's more action-orientated assistant
- Caroline Blakiston as Co-Ordinator, head of espionage activities for the British Government, and Palfrey's direct supervisor

=== Guest cast ===
Notable guest actors included Tim Pigott-Smith, Michael Sheard, Julian Glover, Frederick Treves, Denis Lill, Ronald Hines, Deborah Grant, Martin Jarvis, James Faulkner, Jan Chappell, David Calder, Leslie Phillips, John Shrapnel, Maurice Denham, Gary Waldhorn, Donald Burton, Charles Kay and Carolyn Pickles.

== Episode list ==
=== Series overview ===
Series	Episodes	Originally released	
Series	Episodes	First released	Last released
Special		23 August 1983	
1	4	18 April 1984	8 May 1984
2	6	7 May 1985	11 June 1985
Special		23 May 1989	

=== Storyboard pilot (1983) ===
No.	Title	Directed by	Written by	Original release date
1	""The Traitor""	Christopher Hodson	George Markstein	23 August 1983
A seemingly standard interview turns into something very confusing.

=== Series 1 (1984) ===
No.	Title	Directed by	Written by	Original release date
1	""Once Your Card Is Marked""	Christopher Hodson	George Markstein	18 April 1984
Palfrey's new boss wants him to nail a misfit diplomat who everyone suspects is spying for the Soviets. But Palfrey believes someone is making the man a scapegoat, and he decides to find out why.
2	""The Honeypot and the Bees""	Peter Cregeen	Michael Chapman	25 April 1984
A senior official at the Ministry of Defence is carrying on a clandestine affair with a young woman from Czechoslovakia. When the couple disappear, the Coordinator fears a serious breach in national security.
3	""The Defector""	Ken Grieve	Philip Broadley	1 May 1984
The Co-Ordinator decides to call a press conference announcing the defection of a celebrated Russian author, but Palfrey urges caution. He suspects a trap, especially after the KGB starts to pressure for the author's return.
4	""A Present from Leipzig""	Peter Cregeen	Anthony Skene	8 May 1984
A stolen Russian icon leads Palfrey to the door of a wealthy industrialist who makes periodic trips to the Eastern Bloc. Why did the man not report the theft? And why is a young East German visiting his home?

=== Series 2 (1985) ===
No.	Title	Directed by	Written by	Original release date
1	""Freedom from Longing""	Christopher Hodson	Philip Broadley	7 May 1985
Palfrey's assistant, Blair, gets recruited by another department to investigate a suspected Soviet agent - a Czech-born woman with whom Blair once had an affair. But Palfrey believes the department may have hidden motives for requesting Blair's aid.
2	""Return to Sender""	William Blayne	Philip Broadley	14 May 1985
A former British agent who defected to the Soviet Union makes an unannounced return, threatening to embarrass both countries. Under instructions to silence him, Palfrey decides to up the stakes.
3	""Music of a Dead Prophet""	Gerald Blake	Michael Chapman	21 May 1985
A tell-all book alleges that the British government assassinated an Iranian general in the 1950s and helped topple a regime. Ordered to prevent its publication, Palfrey suspects a government cover-up.
4	""Official Secret""	Christopher Hodson	George Markstein	28 May 1985
A disgruntled former government official believes that double agents still work in the intelligence service--and threatens to tip off the press unless something is done. The Co-Ordinator assigns Palfrey to head him off.
5	""Spygame""	Gerald Blake	Barry Appleton	4 June 1985
On advice from the CIA, Palfrey surveils an American aerospace engineer suspected of passing the Soviets classified information about an Anglo-American defense project. It looks like the case may unearth the mole, but can Palfrey trust the CIA?
6	""The Baited Trap""	John Davies	Philip Broadley	11 June 1985
A contact at the Soviet embassy informs the Co-Ordinator that one of her agents is "playing a double game." Since she doesn't hold this agent in high regard, the Co-Ordinator tells Palfrey to look into it - but he suspects a set-up.

=== Storyboard postscript (1989) ===
No.	Title	Directed by	Written by	Original release date
1	""A Question of Commitment""	Gareth Davies	Philip Broadley	23 May 1989
The trouble with being a spy, is sometimes you come to wonder who's doing the spying and who is the spied upon.

== DVD release ==
The complete series, including the pilot episode ("The Traitor") and the 'postscript' play transmitted in 1989 and featuring Clive Wood as Blair, was released on a 3-DVD set by Network Distributing Ltd. on 16 August 2010.
