= Judgment Night (film) =

1993 film by Stephen Hopkins

- Theatrical release poster
- Directed by: Stephen Hopkins
- Screenplay by: Lewis Colick
- Story by: Lewis Colick; Jere Cunningham
- Produced by: Gene Levy
- Starring: Emilio Estevez; Cuba Gooding Jr.; Denis Leary; Stephen Dorff; Jeremy Piven
- Cinematography: Peter Levy
- Edited by: Tim Wellburn
- Music by: Alan Silvestri
- Production company: Largo Entertainment
- Distributed by: Universal Pictures
- Release date: October 15, 1993
- Running time: 110 minutes
- Country: United States
- Language: English
- Budget: $21 million
- Box office: $12,136,999

Judgment Night is a 1993 American action film directed by Stephen Hopkins. Emilio Estevez, Cuba Gooding Jr., Jeremy Piven and Stephen Dorff star as a group of friends on the run from a gang of drug dealers (led by Denis Leary) after they witness a murder.

== Plot ==
Frank Wyatt, his younger brother John and their friends, Mike Peterson and Ray Cochran travel in Ray's luxurious RV to watch a professional boxing match in Chicago for the night. Ray exits the expressway and cuts through a run down residential neighborhood then accidentally hits a man named Teddy. Inspecting him, they find that he has been shot and has a paper bag filled with money. After taking him as a passenger to get him to a hospital, the RV is sideswiped by a car, leaving it lodged in a narrow alleyway. Three dangerous men — Sykes, Rhodes and Travis — drag Teddy into the street where he is executed by Fallon, a local crime lord, whose money he stole. The gang then pursue the four men, who witnessed the murder.

Taking refuge in an apartment building, the four friends convince a resident to call the police but Fallon and his men arrive at the complex, starting a door-to-door search for their quarry. The resident demands the four friends leave. Her roommate tells the men there is an escape route to another building via the roof. They use a ladder to cross over an alley onto the other rooftop but are pursued by Fallon and his gang. Ray stays behind and tries to bribe their pursuers into letting them go. Fallon, disgusted by Ray's tactics and privileged upbringing, throws him from the roof, killing him.

The trio are chased into the sewers. Mike shoots and kills Sykes, allowing them to escape. Discovering Sykes' body, a comment made by Travis annoys Fallon who drowns Travis in a fit of rage. The three friends break into a swap meet, hoping to summon the police by setting off the building's alarm and are arrested by two security guards. Fallon and Rhodes arrive and kill the guards as the trio hide in the store. Rhodes and Mike engage in a shootout that kills Rhodes but leaves Mike wounded. John retrieves Mike, but Fallon shoots John in the leg. The three friends make their way to a bathroom where Frank tends to their wounds. Frank leaves to try to get help but spots Fallon, who is about to discover John and Mike.

Frank shouts out, causing Fallon to search for him. A fight ensues where Frank ultimately overpowers Fallon and throws him off a ledge to his death. Police and paramedics arrive, taking Mike and John to a hospital where they are expected to survive their wounds. Frank then exits the building to his waiting wife.

== Cast ==
- Emilio Estevez as Frank Wyatt, a family man going with his brother and his two friends to a boxing match
- Cuba Gooding Jr. as Mike Peterson, Frank's best friend who is going to a boxing match
- Denis Leary as Fallon, the drug lord who pursues the four friends after they see him kill a thieving henchman
- Stephen Dorff as John Wyatt, Frank's younger brother, who is invited by Frank to the boxing match after Frank's third friend drops out
- Jeremy Piven as Ray Cochran, a friend who rents an RV to take his friends to a boxing match
- Peter Greene as Sykes, Fallon's second-in-command
- Everlast (credited as Erik Schrody) as Rhodes, one of Fallon's minions
- Michael Wiseman as Travis, one of Fallon's minions
- Michael DeLorenzo as Teddy, Fallon's lieutenant who is executed for stealing from him, right in front of Frank, Mike, John, and Ray, thus beginning the chase
- Christine Harnos as Linda Wyatt, Frank's wife and John's sister-in-law, she reluctantly agrees to let Frank go to the boxing match

== Production ==
=== Development ===
The project had been in the works for several years when screenwriter Kevin Jarre had written the first spec script for the movie (under its original title, "Escape") sometime around 1989 or earlier, which was based on a story idea by Richard DiLello and producer Lawrence Gordon, who produced films like Predator (1987) and Die Hard (1988), bought it in January 1990, as one of a few film projects for his production company, Largo Entertainment.

At the 25th anniversary screening of the film during Cinepocalypse film festival in Chicago, director Stephen Hopkins said that Jarre's script, which was a lot darker and more violent, was one of several scripts commissioned by the producers, with many different writers, including John Carpenter, William Wisher, Randall Wallace, and Christopher Crowe all writing a draft, some of the different script versions involved bikers in the desert outside L.A. and rooftop motorcycle chases, in the same interview at Cinepocalypse, Hopkins further stated: "I was given a lot of scripts, and it was quite a long process, we wanted to work hard to get it right".

The final script would be written by Lewis Colick, based on a story Colick had co-written with novelist Jere Cunningham. The script would undergo more work when screenwriter Larry Ferguson was hired to do rewrites on the script.

=== Casting ===
According to Hopkins, he wanted John Travolta in the lead role and Kevin Spacey in the main villain role; other actors, including Ray Liotta, Tom Cruise, Samuel L. Jackson, and Christian Slater, were either offered or had turned down roles in the film.

Comedian Adam Carolla was a stand-in for one of the "bad guy" actors, Michael Wiseman. He was friends with the assistant director. It was his first foray into film.

=== Filming ===
Filming took place in Chicago, Illinois, primarily at night in the Cabrini-Green neighborhood with additional filming taking place in Long Beach before relocating to Los Angeles.

According to Hopkins, the studio was so taken aback by the bleak tone of the dailies that they thought the crew were using a matte painting.

Hopkins further mentioned that when they were filming the scene where Ray (Jeremy Piven) is confronted by Fallon (Denis Leary), a shooting had occurred near the set, and as a result the Army came in and temporarily shut production down.

== Reception ==
=== Box office ===
The movie debuted at No. 5. The film grossed a total of $12,136,938 at the US box office.

=== Critical response ===
On Rotten Tomatoes, the film has an approval rating of 38% based on 21 reviews and an average rating of 4.2/10. On Metacritic it has a score of 46% based on reviews from 11 reviews, indicating "mixed or average" reviews. Audiences polled by CinemaScore gave the film an average grade of "B" on an A+ to F scale.

Leonard Klady of Variety wrote, "The most chilling aspect of the urban thriller Judgment Night is how infinitely superior its craft is to its art. This is an exceedingly well directed, cleverly filmed and edited, tension-filled affair. It is also a wholly preposterous, muddled, paranoid's view of the inner-city nightmare where the slightest misstep is sure to have a fateful result." Richard Harrington of The Washington Post felt the movie was "regrettably familiar fare" and said, "The filmmakers have made a big deal of a soundtrack that features 11 collaborations between rappers and rockers (...), but their casting consciousness is less adventurous."

== Soundtrack and score ==
A soundtrack for the film, titled Judgment Night: Music from the Motion Picture (featuring rock and rap collaborations), was released the same year. The score for the film, composed and conducted by Alan Silvestri, is fully orchestral. Silvestri previously collaborated with Hopkins on Predator 2.

In 2005, Intrada released a complete version of Silvestri's orchestral score, containing two rejected tracks that he composed with electronic synthesized elements.

=== Score album track listing ===
All tracks composed and conducted by Alan Silvestri

Opening montage song "Fallin'" Song by De La Soul and Teenage Fanclub

1. "Freeway Confrontation" – 2:07 – plays when the group engages in a fight on the highway
2. "New Passenger" – 4:33
3. "Execution" – 5:22 – plays when the group witnesses a murder and escapes the RV
4. "Train Yard" – 2:13 – plays while the group is hiding in a train cab
5. "Some 'Splainin' to Do" – 5:17
6. "Bat Woman" – 2:14 – plays when Frank sees a woman throwing trash
7. "Ladder Crossing" – 9:45 – plays when the group crosses the bridge ladder
8. "Ray's Deal" – 3:24 – plays when Ray makes a deal with the goons
9. "Ray Eats It" – 2:05 – plays when Ray fell off of the building.
10. "Hello Ladies" – 1:30 – plays when the goons find them in the sewers
11. "Make a Stand" – 3:32 – plays when Mike and the group decide to make a stand against the goons
12. "Mike Shoots Sykes" – 5:20
13. "All I Got Is You" – 4:40
14. "Stalk & Talk" – 4:41
15. "Final Fight" – 3:34
16. "It's Over" – 1:04
17. "Frank Takes the Wheel" – 4:02 (Unused) – written for the scene when the group is chasing the police vehicle
18. "I Tried" – 2:36 (Unused) – written for the scene when John is sobbing and makes a confession to his brother Frank
19. "Judgment Night Theme" – 3:09
