= Michael C. Gwynne =

American actor

- Born: October 1, 1942 (age 83); Detroit, Michigan, U.S.
- Occupation: Actor
- Years active: 1970–2009

Michael C. Gwynne (born October 1, 1942) is an American film, television and radio actor. His film roles include Payday (1973), A Cold Night's Death (1973), Harry in Your Pocket (1973), The Terminal Man (1974), Special Delivery (1976), Butch and Sundance: The Early Days (1979), Raise the Titanic (1980), Threshold (1981), Cherry 2000 (1987), Sunset (1988), Blue Heat (1990), The Last of the Finest (1990) and Private Parts (1997).

Gwynne's distinctive voice is familiar through recordings and radio. He is one of the prime narrators on the 1971 Elektra Records album, "A Child's Garden Of Grass (A Pre-Legalization Comedy)." He has narrated numerous audiobooks autobiographies on Elie Wiesel, Prince and other celebrities.

In the late 1970s and into the 80s, Gwynne joined Phil Austin of the Firesign Theatre and comic Frazer Smith as the multi-voiced three-man cast of an improvisational surrealist comedy radio show, "Hollywood Niteshift," first on KROQ and later on KLOS, both in Los Angeles.

Gwynne is the son of band leader Frankie Kaye.

== Filmography ==
=== Film ===
Year	Title	Role	Notes
1973	Payday	Clarence McGinty	
1973	Harry in Your Pocket	Fence	
1974	The Terminal Man	Dr. Robert Morris	
1976	Special Delivery	Graff	
1979	Butch and Sundance: The Early Days	Mike Cassidy	
1980	Raise the Titanic	Bohannon	
1981	Threshold	Jay Wingate	
1982	Harry Tracy: The Last of the Wild Bunch	David Merrill	
1986	Tai-Pan	Cooper	
1988	Cherry 2000	Slim	
1988	Sunset	Mooch	
1990	The Last of the Finest	Anthony Reece	
1995	Dillinger and Capone	Perkins	
1997	Private Parts	Duke of Rock	
2000	Nostradamus	Astrologer La Font	
2009	Knowing	Coast Patrol Official	

=== Television ===
Year	Title	Role	Notes
1970	The Bold Ones: The Protectors	Billy	Episode: "Memo from the Class of '76"
1970	The Bold Ones: The Senator	Whitney	Episode: "Power Play"
1970, 1971	The Psychiatrist	Blaine / Pusher	2 episodes
1971	The Name of the Game	Dr. Parker	Episode: "LA 2017"
1971	Thief	Junkie	Television film
1971	Longstreet	Harper	Episode: "The Shape of Nightmares"
1972	Cade's County	Jack	Episode: "Dead Past"
1972	The Sixth Sense	The Silversmith	Episode: "Eye of the Haunted"
1972	The Bold Ones: The New Doctors	Charlie Luwaine	Episode: "Time Bomb in the Chest"
1972	Emergency!	Jerry Dondon	Episode: "Dinner Date"
1973	A Cold Night's Death	Val Adams	Television film
1974	Slither	Stranger	Television film
1974	The Healers	Dr. Anton Balinowski	Television film
1974–1975	Harry O	Randall Groves / Andrew Marsh	2 episodes
1975	Kojak	Blaise	Episode: "The Trade-Off"
1975	Matt Helm	Charlie Danbury	Episode: "Matt Helm"
1977	The Sunday Drama	Jack Hampton	Episode: "Spawn"
1977	Baretta	Nicky Moss	Episode: "It's Hard But It's Fair"
1977	Rafferty	Dr. Prud'homme / McMurdo	3 episodes
1979	Some Kind of Miracle	Dr. Mark Spencer	Television film
1979	Dallas	Dr. Rogers	Episode: "John Ewing III: Part 2"
1979	The Chevy Chase National Humor Test	Various (uncredited)	Television special
1979	The Streets of L.A.	Walter Kiner	Television film
1980	Guyana Tragedy: The Story of Jim Jones	Larry King	Television film
1980	Tenspeed and Brown Shoe	Dean Culpits	Episode: "The Treasure of Sierra Madre Street"
1980	CHiPs	Cleve	Episode: "The Poachers"
1982	Victims	Attorney Walters	Television film
1982	Thou Shalt Not Kill	Roebuck	Television film
1982	Hill Street Blues	Farley	Episode: "Invasion of the Third World Body Snatchers"
1982	Deadly Encounter	John Servasco	Television film
1982	Cagney & Lacey	Phillip Malik	Episode: "I'll Be Home for Christmas"
1982–1983	Falcon Crest	Steve Barton	4 episodes
1983	White Water Rebels	Leland	Television film
1983	Remington Steele	Considine	Episode: "To Stop a Steele"
1983	Blood Feud	Hoffa's Attorney	Television film
1984	Calendar Girl Murders	Krell	Television film
1984	Knight Rider	Paul Brock	Episode: "Let It Be Me"
1984	He's Not Your Son	Dr. Langtry	Television film
1985	My Wicked, Wicked Ways: The Legend of Errol Flynn	Raoul Walsh	Television film
1985	Seduced	'Fitz' Fitzgibbons	Television film
1985	MacGyver	Dr. Burke	Episode: "Pilot"
1985	Beverly Hills Cowgirl Blues	Jimmy Blue	Television film
1985	Simon & Simon	Burton 'Burt' Ferris	Episode: "Walk a Mile in My Hat"
1986	Alfred Hitchcock Presents	Bus Driver	Episode: "Alfred Hitchcock Presents"
1986	Amazing Stories	Jail Attendant	Episode: "Mirror, Mirror"
1986	Sidekicks	Shaw	Episode: "Thrill of the Chase"
1986	Houston: The Legend of Texas	Moseley Baker	Television film
1987	Police Story: the Freeway Killings	Gavin	Television film
1988	Unholy Matrimony	Lt. Al Kerns	Television film
1988–1994	Matlock	Various characters	5 episodes
1989, 1991	Father Dowling Mysteries	Packer / Lt. McGuire	2 episodes
1990	Goodnight Sweet Wife: A Murder in Boston	Conners	Television film
1990	Jake and the Fatman	Frank Compton	Episode: "My Boy Bill"
1991	Tropical Heat	Minton	Episode: "Family Affair"
1991	Blood Ties	Marvin	Television film
1992	Dangerous Curves	Stanley La Roque	Episode: "Back... and to the Left"
1993	Days of Our Lives	Dr. LeBlanc	3 episodes
1994	Jack Reed: A Search for Justice	Pete Myers	Television film
1996	The Client	Mulvey	Episode: "The Morning After"
2002	Courage the Cowardly Dog	Voice	13 episodes
2005	Meet the Santas	Rev. Moran	Television film
