= A Cold Night's Death =

1973 American film directed by Jerrold Freedman

- Genre: Horror; Sci-Fi; Thriller
- Written by: Christopher Knopf
- Directed by: Jerrold Freedman
- Starring: Robert Culp; Eli Wallach; Michael C. Gwynne
- Music by: Gil Melle
- Country of origin: United States
- Original language: English

Production
- Executive producers: Leonard Goldberg; Aaron Spelling
- Producer: Paul Junger Witt
- Production location: 20th Century Fox Studios
- Cinematography: Leonard J. South
- Editor: David Berlatsky
- Running time: 74 minutes
- Production companies: ABC Circle Films; Spelling-Goldberg Productions; 20th Century Fox Television

Original release
- Network: ABC
- Release: January 30, 1973

A Cold Night's Death (also known as The Chill Factor) is a 1973 American made for television horror-thriller film. The film was shown on January 30, 1973, on the ABC network.

The film was directed by Jerrold Freedman and starred Robert Culp, Eli Wallach, and Michael C. Gwynne. Culp and Wallach are two research scientists at the Tower Mountain Research Station (filmed at the University of California's high altitude Barcroft Research Station) who are trying to unravel the mysterious death of a colleague.

== Plot ==
After the mysterious deaths of their colleagues, scientists Robert Jones (Robert Culp) and Frank Enari (Eli Wallach) are sent to an isolated research station deep in the Arctic Circle to continue their observation of monkey behavioral patterns. As the two men quarrel over who has to clean the station and other responsibilities, they slowly realize that the deaths of their co-workers may have something to do with a mysterious and dangerous presence, one that the monkeys increasingly fear.

== Cast ==
- Robert Culp as Robert Jones
- Eli Wallach as Frank Enari
- Michael C. Gwynne as Val Adams
- Vic Perrin as Ryan Horner (voiceover; uncredited)

== Reception ==
Graeme Clark from The Spinning Image rated the film seven out of ten stars, praising the film's atmosphere, performances, and score. Dave Sindelar from Fantastic Movie Musings and Ramblings also praised the film's atmosphere and performances, calling it "one very effective TV-movie thriller". The Terror Trap awarded the film three out of four stars, calling it "a triumph of mood creation". The movie was nominated for the 1974 Edgar Allan Poe Awards for Best Television Feature or Miniseries.

== See also ==
- List of American films of 1973
