= The Chill Factor (1993 film) =

- Directed by: Christopher Webster
- Written by: Julian Weaver
- Produced by: Christopher Webster
- Starring: Dawn Laurrie; Aaron Kjenaas; Connie Snyder
- Cinematography: Joseph Friedman
- Edited by: Amy Summer
- Music by: John Tatgenhorst
- Production company: Filmworld International
- Release date: July 28, 1993
- Running time: 85 minutes
- Country: United States
- Language: English
- Budget: $400,000

The Chill Factor, also released as Demon Possessed, is a 1993 American supernatural horror film directed by Christopher Webster and starring Dawn Laurrie, Aaron Kjenaas, and Connie Snyder. Its plot follows a group of snowmobilers who find themselves stranded at an abandoned Catholic camp run by the Dominican Order, which was co-opted by Satanists and used for occult rituals. As they spend the night, the group are subjected to various supernatural occurrences.

== Plot ==
Tom and his fiancée Jeannie, along with younger sister Karen and her boyfriend, Chris—as well as their friends Ron and Lissa—are on a winter snomobiling vacation in rural Wisconsin to celebrate Chris's birthday. At a local tavern, Lissa is harassed by a drunken racist man who calls her derogatory African American slurs. A kindly waitress, Bessie, apologizes for the patron's behavior, and recommends the group venture to remote trails along Black Friar Lake as part of their snowmobiling excursion.

Along the lake, Tom crashes into a tree and severely injures himself. Chris, a medical student, finds Tom is in shock, and that he needs shelter from the cold. The group find the rustic, abandoned Camp Saint Dominic, a religious summer camp, situated in the woods near the lake, and decide to stay the night. As Tom's condition worsens, Ron departs on snowmobile at nightfall to seek help. Shortly after Ron departs, Tom regains consciousness, but remains weak.

Karen finds a number of mementos from the camp's past, including photographs as well as a makeshift ouija board. Karen, Chris, Lissa, and Jeannie begin to play with the board, though Jeannie is initially reluctant. The pointer on the board begins to spin rapidly, during which Tom goes into convulsions and becomes possessed by a demonic entity. Meanwhile, Ron crashes his snowmobile into a fence and is killed. While Karen and Chris have sex, Lissa explores the lodge, and finds newspaper clippings about a Satanic cult having taken over Camp Saint Dominic. Lissa becomes frightened, and is cornered in a pantry closet by a supernatural entity, where an industrial fan decapitates her.

Chris goes to look for Lissa, but senses he is being watched. He flees outside, where he is impaled through the eye by a falling icicle. Tom insults Karen, suggesting Chris went to find Lissa to cheat on her. Jeannie notices Tom is acting uncharacteristic from his normal self. At Tom's request, Jeannie removes a bandages from his hand and head, and finds his wounds that were there shortly before have miraculously healed. Tom seduces Jeannie, and the two have passionate sex. Meanwhile, Karen is hanged in a volleyball net while exploring the camp gymnasium.

In the morning, Jeannie finds her friend's corpses, and realizes Tom is missing. She consults the ouija board for answers, and it tells her Tom is her enemy, and to leave. As she flees, Jeannie witnesses a cloaked Tom ceremonially knelt beneath photographs of the camp's past visitors. She flees on a snowmobile, but is pursued by Tom, who boards Ron's crashed snowmobile. A protracted chase ensues before Tom crashes into a snowplow, which runs over his body, crushing him and causing his snowmobile to explode. Tom, caught in the inferno, is burned alive. Jeannie flees the scene as a sheriff arrives.

In voiceover narration from thirty years in the future, Jeannie, recalling the events, explains that she revisited Black Friar Lake and found the camp was merely a set of ruins—it had burned down decades prior. She expresses regret over agreeing to partake in the ouija board, but that the curiosity to do so was in her nature.

== Cast ==
- Dawn Laurrie as Jeannie
  - Barbara Claman as older Jeannie (voice)
- Aaron Kjenaas as Tom
- Connie Snyder as Karen
- David Fields as Chris
- Eve Montgomery as Lissa
- Jim Cagle as Ron
- Bekki Vallin as Bessie

== Production ==
The Chill Factor was filmed at Windsor Lake Studios in Eagle River, Wisconsin, a studio established by several British filmmakers and financiers, among them director Christopher Webster. The studio had established a deal with the New York-based Filmworld International to film three low-budget horror films there, each produced for $500,000. Because the previous film, Trapped Alive, had gone over budget, the funding for The Chill Factor was reduced to $400,000.

Location filming also took place at an unoccupied Girl Scouts camp. Principal photography began in January 1989.

=== Home media ===
The film was released on VHS on July 28, 1993 under the title Demon Possessed by Action International Video.

Arrow Films released The Chill Factor on Blu-ray on July 16, 2019.
