= Hector Nicol =

Scottish comedian, singer and actor (1920–1985)

- Nicol performing live in Scotland
- Born: 9 November 1920; Paisley, Renfrewshire, Scotland
- Died: 2 July 1985 (aged 64); Edinburgh, Scotland
- Occupations: Comedian, singer, actor
- Years active: 1935–1985

Hector Nicol (9 November 1920 – 2 July 1985) was a Scottish comedian, singer and actor.

== Acting career ==
Nicol starred in few shows during his career. His most notable role was that of a dying gangster in the BBC Television play Just a Boys' Game (1979) and also in A Sense of Freedom (1981). He also starred in Take the High Road, a Scottish soap opera.

== Singing career ==
Nicol wrote and sang "The Hearts Song" for Hearts, and "Glory, Glory to the Hibees" for Hibs. He also wrote and sang "The Terrors of Tannadice" for Dundee United, "Dark Blue Of Dundee" for Dundee and "The Morton Song" for Greenock Morton. However, he actually supported St Mirren F.C.. His 1984 album, Bravo Juliet!, reached number 92 for one week in the UK Albums Chart.

== Influence ==
Nicol's influence was important on Scotland's more recent crop of comedians including Billy Connolly, Des Clarke and Elaine C. Smith. Other famous people who have stated they are fans of Hector include Sean Connery, John Barrowman and Tommy Sheridan.

== Personal life ==
Nicol married Delina (Lena) P. Sweetman in 1948 and they had three sons together, two of whom died tragically. One choked to death while eating, while another was murdered in a senseless attack. Stephen Nicol, age 19, was stabbed to death by a 15-year-old boy at a bus stop in Edinburgh on 8 June 1973. At trial, it was revealed that the perpetrator, George Riddell, was not motivated by any greed or anger, but had simply decided to stab someone. David Brand, Lord Brand sentenced Riddell to indefinite detention for the murder of Stephen Nicol, who had suffered from a chronic illness. Nicol nearly left the entertainment business after his son's murder.

Nicol, who suffered from angina, died at his home in Edinburgh, at the age of 64. He was survived by his wife of thirty-seven years, Lena (1922–2013) and his one surviving son.

== Filmography ==
=== Film ===
Year	Film	Role	Notes
1979	Just a Boys' Game	Granda	BBC Play for Today
1981	A Sense of Freedom	Uncle Jodie	ITV

=== Television ===
Year	Film	Role	Notes
1982–1985	Take the High Road	Fraser Ramsay	BBC Television

=== Comedy Specials and albums ===
Year	Title	Notes	Formats
1978	Scotch and Full of it	Recorded Live at Tartan Arms, Bannockburn in 1978.	Vinyl/Cassette/CD
1978	Laffin Room Only	Recorded Live at the Greenfield Club, Hamilton in 1978.	Vinyl/Cassette/CD
1979	Cop of the North	Recorded Live at the Clover Leaf, Aberdeen in 1979.	Vinyl/Cassette
1979	Lady and the Tramp	Recorded Live at the Venture Lounge, Linwood in 1979.	Vinyl/Cassette
1979	Queen of the Road	Recorded Live at the Baird & Scottish Social Club, Coatbridge in 1979.	Vinyl/Cassette
1980	Hobo Sexual?	Recorded Live at the Baron Suite, Edinburgh in 1980.	Vinyl/Cassette
1981	Bawdy Lines	Recorded Live at Chequers, Falkirk in 1981.	Vinyl/Cassette/VHS
1982	I'm a Country Member	Recorded Live at Hasties Farm, Blantyre in 1982.	Vinyl/Cassette/CD
1983	Greatest B**bs	Recorded Live at Dean Park Hotel in 1983.	Vinyl/Cassette/VHS
1984	Bravo Juliet!	Recorded Live at Rankin Park, Greenock in 1984.	Vinyl/Cassette
1984	The Tartan Tinker	Recorded Live at Marco's, Edinburgh in 1984.	Vinyl/Cassette/VHS
