= Unman, Wittering and Zigo =

1958 audio drama by Giles Cooper

Unman, Wittering and Zigo is a 1958 radio play by the Anglo-Irish playwright Giles Cooper.

== Plot ==
The play is set in a traditional boys' boarding school. A teacher has died, apparently by accident: he fell off a cliff above the sea. John Ebony, a young man, is engaged to take his place; it is his first job and he hopes it will be permanent.

The class is strangely regimented and gradually the dialogue by class members becomes more ominous and threatening. They tell Ebony they killed the former teacher and show him the dead man's bloodstained wallet. They say they all have alibis. When Ebony reports this to the Headmaster, he brushes it off. When he seeks guidance from Cary Farthingale, the eccentric art master, he laughs. Ebony struggles to understand the truth, and who their leader might be.

Intimidated by his class, and scorned by his new wife Nadia, Ebony feels like a failure. When he refuses to teach, the boys organise their own education, and behave perfectly when the Headmaster comes in. The boys gamble on the horses, and Ebony consents to carry their bets to a bookmaker in the town; he declines a commission.

Wittering, the weakling of the class, kills himself, leaving a suicide note admitting that he planned the murder, but Ebony still does not know who actually committed the crime. The boys confess everything to the police or their parents.

Ebony asks Farthingale "who bound them together ... who told them what to do." Farthingale leads Ebony to acknowledge that it was authority, the teachers, including Ebony himself, who moulded them. Authority, Farthingale says, "is a necessary evil, and every bit as evil as it is necessary."

== Adaptations ==
The play was adapted for television as an episode of BBC 2's Theatre 625 series, broadcast in June 1965. It was the BBC's Prix Italia entry that year. It featured a number of young actors including Hywel Bennett and Dennis Waterman.

In 1967, the stage premiere was produced at Manchester Grammar School, directed by Brian Derbyshire and Brian Phythian, with Patrick Miller as John Ebony, and Christopher Webber as Bungabine.

A feature film version, directed by John Mackenzie, was released in 1971 with a screenplay by Simon Raven which stayed true to the basic plot, but added sexual scenes and changed Ebony's wife's name from Nadia to Sylvia. The 1971 film featured actors including David Hemmings and Michael Kitchen.
