= Colin MacDonald (writer) =

Scottish writer for television and radio

Colin MacDonald was born in 1956 in Inverness, Scotland. He is a prolific writer for television and radio. Television credits include The Dunroamin' Rising (BBC1), The Gift (BBC1), The Wreck on the Highway (BBC1), Sharpe's Honour (ITV) and episodes in the series Blue Murder (ITV), Heartbeat (ITV), Casualty (BBC1), and Para Handy (BBC1). Radio credits include Killing the Butterfly (BBC Radio 4), Hill of Rains (BBC Radio 4), The Colour of Summer (BBC Radio 4), King of Hearts (BBC Radio Scotland), The Stanley Baxter Playhouse: The Hat (BBC Radio 4) and Calum's Road (BBC Radio 4). In 2021, BBC Radio 4 aired a full-cast adaptation of C. J. Sansom's mystery novel Lamentation, dramatised by MacDonald, with Justin Salinger starring as Shardlake.
