= Irene Sunters =

Scottish actress (1928–2005)

- Born: Camillo Irene Sunters; 29 February 1928; The Gorbals, Scotland
- Died: 2 September 2005 (aged 77); Glasgow, Scotland
- Occupation: actress

Camillo Irene Sunters (29 February 1928 – 2 September 2005) was a Scottish actress. She trained at the Royal Scottish Academy of Music and Drama and her theatre work includes appearances at the Citizens Theatre, the Lyceum Theatre, Edinburgh, the Royal Court, Hampstead, Shepherd's Bush, Soho Poly, Birmingham Rep, and the Duke's Playhouse.

She was best known for playing Maggie Ferguson the bus driver in Take the High Road from the first episode in 1980 and appeared as a regular character until 1982 with guest appearances until 1990. She also played the role of May Morrison, mother of Rowan Morrison in the cult horror film The Wicker Man in 1973, and Mary's mother in Rab C. Nesbitt. She also appeared in Taggart (Scottish Television), Dunroamin' Risin' (BBC) and End of the Line (BBC).

Sunters died in September 2005 after some years of poor health and inactivity.

== Theatre ==
Year	Title	Role	Company	Theatre	Director	Notes
1989 & 1990	The Guid Sisters	Angeline Sauve	The Tron Theatre Company	Tron Theatre, Glasgow	Michael Boyd	play by Michel Tremblay, translated into Scots by Bill Findlay and Martin Bowman

== Filmography ==
1956: The Anatomist (TV movie) starring Irene Sunters (as Jessie Ann) was released on 6 February 1956.

1961: Three Ring Circus (TV movie) starring Irene Sunters was released on 2 February 1961.

1973: The Wicker Man (movie) She played the mother (May) of Rowan Morrison in this cult horror film

1981: A Sense of Freedom (TV movie).

1985: Restless Natives (Movie).

1988: The Steamie (TV movie) with Irene Sunters as Grumpy Woman was released on 30 December 1988.

Television
Year	Title	Role	Notes
1975	The Five Red Herrings	Mrs. Smith-Lemesurier	A four-part BBC adaptation of the Lord Peter Wimsey story by Robert Tronson
1985	Edge of Darkness	Mrs. Girvan	TV drama series by Troy Kennedy Martin
