= Giles Cooper (playwright) =

British playwright (1918–1966)

Giles Cooper OBE
- Born: Giles Stannus Cooper; 9 August 1918; Carrickmines
- Died: 2 December 1966 (aged 48); Surbiton, Surrey
- Occupations: Playwright, radio dramatist
- Writing career
- Notable work: Unman, Wittering and Zigo

Giles Stannus Cooper, OBE (9 August 1918 – 2 December 1966) was an Anglo-Irish playwright and prolific radio dramatist, writing over sixty scripts for BBC Radio and television. He was awarded the OBE in 1960 for "Services to Broadcasting". A dozen years after his death at only 48 the Giles Cooper Awards for Radio Drama were instituted in his honour, jointly by the BBC and the publishers Eyre Methuen.

== Early life ==
Giles Stannus Cooper was born into a landed Anglo-Irish family at Carrickmines near Dublin on 9 August 1918, the son of Guy Edward Cooper, a Royal Navy Commander, and nephew of politician and writer Bryan Ricco Cooper.

Cooper was educated at the prep school Arnold House School, St John's Wood, London, at Lancing College on the South Downs, and later studied languages in Grenoble in the French Alps and at a language school at San Sebastian in Northern Spain. It was here, with the Spanish Civil War raging around him, that he was shot through the arm one evening by a sniper's bullet, while on a mission to purchase cigarettes before dinner. The Royal Navy subsequently came to his rescue, gave him medical attention and dropped him off across the French border at St Jean de Luz.

His father had planned the life of a diplomat for him, in which a Cambridge degree in Law and a Call to the Bar were prerequisites. Cooper, however, confounded these plans by enrolling as an actor at the Webber Douglas Academy of Dramatic Art in London. A contemporary, joining on the same morning was the actor Michael Denison who recalls their first meeting in his autobiography Overture & Beginners. Cooper's studies were interrupted by the Second World War. Initially conscripted into the ranks, he was selected for training at the Royal Military College, Sandhurst, gained a commission and was subsequently despatched to the Far East in 1942. He served as an infantry officer in the West Yorkshire Regiment, spending three grueling years in the jungles of Burma fighting the Japanese, on occasion hand-to-hand.

After the war he worked as an actor, first at the Arts Theatre under Alec Clunes, where he met his future wife, the actress Gwyneth Lewis. Seasons in repertory theatre at Newquay (with Kenneth Williams) at the Connaught Theatre, Worthing (with Harold Pinter) and at the Regent's Park Open Air Theatre continued until 1952 when he turned to script editing and then full-time writing.

== Writing ==
Cooper was a pioneer in writing for the broadcast media, becoming prolific in both radio and television drama. His early successes included radio dramatisations of Dickens' Oliver Twist, William Golding's Lord of the Flies and John Wyndham's science fiction novel The Day of the Triffids. Wyndham wrote to Cooper congratulating him after the first broadcast. On television he was one of the main scriptwriters for the BBC's Maigret series of detective adaptations starring Rupert Davies in 52 episodes, for his work on which Cooper won the Guild of Television Producers' Script Award in 1961. He also adapted four Sherlock Holmes stories, Ernest Hemingway's For Whom the Bell Tolls (1965), Les Misérables, Flaubert's Madame Bovary and Evelyn Waugh's trilogy of novels Sword of Honour (1967) for Theatre 625. He was more successful in the theatre with his original works as opposed to adaptations. His first full-length play Never Get Out was staged at the Edinburgh Festival in 1950 and transferred to the Gate Theatre in London.

The first of his radio plays to make his reputation was Mathry Beacon (1956) about a small detachment of men and women still guarding a Top Secret "missile deflector" somewhere in Wales, some years after the war has ended; the first and only American production, starring Martyn Green, was syndicated to public stations in 1981 by the National Radio Theater of Chicago. Also of note are Unman, Wittering and Zigo (1958) in which a young teacher finds his predecessor has been murdered by the boys in his class and The Long House (1965). Out of the Crocodile ran at the Phoenix Theatre in 1963-64 starring Kenneth More, Celia Johnson and Cyril Raymond. The Spies are Singing was presented at the Nottingham Playhouse in 1966, starring the theatre's Artistic Director John Neville.

Many of his plays were later adapted for both stage and television. Unman, Wittering and Zigo, Seek Her Out, in which a woman (played by Toby Robins) witnesses an assassination on the London Underground and becomes the next would-be victim of the perpetrators; and The Long House were parts of an unrelated trilogy of plays by Cooper broadcast on BBC2's Theatre 625 during the summer of 1965. He also wrote The Other Man a television drama starring Michael Caine, Siân Phillips and John Thaw and first broadcast on ITV in 1964. Everything in the Garden was first performed by the Royal Shakespeare Company in 1962 at the Arts Theatre, London; in 1967, an American adaptation by Edward Albee, was first performed in 1967 at the Plymouth Theatre, New York City, and dedicated to Cooper's memory.

His last play was Happy Family was first presented at the Hampstead Theatre in 1966 starring Wendy Craig; it then transferred to the West End with Michael Denison, Dulcie Gray and Robert Flemyng. A revival in 1984 directed by Maria Aitken opened in Windsor and transferred to the Duke of York's Theatre in the West End, starring Ian Ogilvy, Angela Thorne, James Laurenson and Stephanie Beacham.

== Death ==
Cooper died at the age of 48 after falling from a train as it passed through Surbiton, Surrey, returning from a Guild of Dramatists' Christmas dinner at the Garrick on 2 December 1966. A post-mortem showed he had consumed the equivalent of half a bottle of whisky and the coroner at Kingston in January 1967 returned a verdict of misadventure. There have been several attempts to attribute his death to suicide, in particularly by The Stage newspaper. When interviewed by Humphrey Carpenter in 1995, BBC radio producer Douglas Cleverdon's widow, Nest, told him that she believed it was suicide. Cooper's family have always strongly disputed this, not only because it bears no relationship to the playwright's apparent frame of mind during the period leading up to his death, but also because it unfairly colours appraisal of his work from an academic standpoint.

== Personal life and legacy ==
In 1978 the Giles Cooper Awards for radio drama were established by the BBC in conjunction with the publishers Eyre Methuen, and continued to be awarded until the early 1990s.

Giles Cooper had two sons and four grandchildren, including actor Giles Cooper.
