= Ken Hutchison =

Scottish actor (1948–2021)

- Born: 24 November 1948; Leslie, Fife, Scotland
- Died: 9 August 2021 (aged 72)
- Occupation: Actor

Aitken Hutchison (24 November 1948 – 9 August 2021) was a Scottish actor.

== Life and career ==
Hutchison played roles in many episodes of Play for Today from 1970 to 1980, such as in "Just a Boys' Game". Hutchison played Norman Scutt in the Sam Peckinpah film Straw Dogs (1971) where he was the most shady in the group of nefarious local thugs antagonizing Dustin Hoffman's character and especially his ingenue wife played by Susan George. Fellow actress Sally Thomsett described Hutchison as "A fun-loving rogue."

Hutchison co-starred with Robert Mitchum in one of his few protagonist roles in The Wrath of God (1972) where The New York Times observed the performance of "the fine Ken Hutchison". He suffered a near catastrophic accident near the end of filming in which he cut himself on some broken glass, opening a gash from wrist to elbow. He was discovered by Mitchum's wife Dorothy, who applied a life saving tourniquet to stop the bleeding. Since Hutchison was in nearly every scene, the insurance company covering the production shut it down for a month for him to heal. When he returned, he was unable to do anything strenuous, and had to keep the arm covered. With the long layoff, the cast and crew just wanted to get the film done, resulting in confusion, continuity gaps and dislocation.

In 1975, he appeared as Vincent Vaughn in an episode of the police drama The Sweeney entitled "Stay Lucky, Eh?" This was followed in 1978 when he appeared in the second of the big screen spin offs Sweeney 2 as Hill, the leader of an uncompromising gang of armed robbers.

In 1980, he appeared as Brickett in the episode "National Pelmet", the series 2 opener of the TV drama Minder. He played a supporting role in the 1981 historical miniseries Masada, starring Peter O'Toole. He had a minor role as a police sergeant in the Oscar winning motion picture Gandhi (1982). He appeared as the lead villain's henchman in the 1985 medieval fantasy film Ladyhawke directed by Richard Donner.

Hutchison was the titular Mac Murphy in the ITV children's drama Murphy's Mob in which he played the manager of fictional Third Division football club Dunmore United. The series ran from 1982 to 1985.

From 1990 to 1999, he appeared in multiple roles in the British police television series The Bill. In 1991, he starred as the protagonist's father in the movie Blonde Fist. In 1993, he had a starring role as a private tutor of a gifted young man in the film As an Eilean.

Hutchison died on 9 August 2021, aged 72.

== Selected filmography ==
- Groupie Girl (1970) as Colin
- Julius Caesar (1970) as Plebeian (uncredited)
- Straw Dogs (1971) as Norman Scutt
- The Wrath of God (1972) as Emmet Keogh
- Deadly Strangers (1975) as Jim Nicholls
- Space: 1999 – "The Seance Spectre" (1976 TV episode) as Sanderson
- Sweeney 2 (1978) as Hill
- Wuthering Heights (1978) (BBC TV serial) as Heathcliff
- All Quiet on the Western Front (1979) as Hammacher
- Hazell Hazell And The Baker Street Sleuth (1979) (TV episode) as Michael McGeegan
- Masada (1981) as Fronto
- A Captain's Tale (1982) as Jimmy Dickerson
- Gandhi (1982) as Police Sergeant
- Ladyhawke (1985) as Captain Marquet
- Hideaway (1986) (TV series) as Colin Wright
- Blonde Fist (1991) as John O'Dowd
- As an Eilean (1993) as MacAlasdair
