= Wendy Bishop =

American author, educator, and scholar

- Born: January 13, 1953
- Died: November 21, 2003 (aged 50)
- Occupation: Professor of English
- Awards: Joseph Henry Jackson Award for poetry, San Francisco Foundation, 1980.

Academic background
- Education: BA, University of California Davis MA, University of California Davis MA, University of California Davis PhD, Indiana University of Pennsylvania
- Thesis: A microethnography w ith case studies of teacher development through a graduate training course in writing (1988)
- Doctoral advisor: Donald A. McAndrew

Academic work
- Institutions: Florida State University

Wendy Bishop (1953–2003) was an academic, scholar, and poet, known for her contributions to the fields of rhetoric and composition and creative writing studies. Former Kellogg W. Hunt Professor of English at Florida State University, Bishop authored and edited a number of books on composition and creative writing, including Acts of Revision; The Subject Is Writing, The Subject Is Reading, as well as Keywords in Creative Writing and Thirteen Ways of Looking for a Poem: A Guide to Writing Poetry. Her work significantly influenced both creative writing and composition communities on a national level.

== Biography ==
=== Education ===
Bishop attended the University of California, Davis earning a BA in Studio Art and BA in English (both with honors) in 1975. She returned to UC Davis for two Master's degrees, one in English with a focus on Creative Writing, which she earned in 1976, and the other an M.A. in the Teaching of English, earned in 1979. She returned to school later to earn a Ph.D. in English Rhetoric from Indiana University of Pennsylvania in 1988.

=== Teaching and professional experience ===
From 1984-1985, Bishop served as chair of Communications, Humanities, and Fine Arts Division at Navajo Community College in Tsaile, Arizona. Following this, she was a visiting assistant professor of English at University of Alaska Fairbanks from 1985-1989. Toward the end of her career, Bishop was associate professor of English and director of first-year composition at Florida State University, where she worked until her death in November 2003. In 2000, she was named a Kellogg W. Hunt Professor of English.

== Professional contributions ==
Wendy Bishop was a prominent figure in the then emergent field of creative writing studies, known for her significant contributions to creative writing pedagogy and scholarship. She authored or co-authored a number of influential works, including, with Hans Ostrum, Colors of a Different Horse: Rethinking Creative Writing Theory and Pedagogy in 1994 and Released into Language: Options for Teaching Creative Writing in 1998. These texts provided foundational insights into creative writing theory and teaching practices when there was little scholarship in this area. In 2001, she chaired the annual Conference on College Composition and Communication.

== Selected works ==
=== Books ===
- Keywords in Creative Writing (co-written with David Starkey, 2006)
- Finding Our Way: A Writing Teacher's Sourcebook (2004)
- Acts of Revision: A Guide for Writers (2004)
- Research Writing Revisited: A Sourcebook for Teachers (co-edited with Pavel Zemliansky, 2004)
- On Writing: A Process Reader (2003)
- The Subject Is Story (co-edited with Hans Ostrum, 2003)
- Reading Into Writing (editor, 2002)
- The Subject Is Research: Processes and Practices (2001)
- Metro: Journeys in Writing Creatively (co-written with Hans Ostrum and Katherine Haake, 2000)
- Ethnographic Writing Research: Writing It Down, Writing It Up, and Reading It (1999)
- Thirteen Ways of Looking for a Poem: A Guide to Writing Poetry (1999)
- When We Say We're Home: A Quartet of Place and Memory (co-written with W Scott Olsen, 1999)
- Released Into Language (1998)
- Elements of Alternate Style: Essays on Writing and Revision (1997)
- Genre and Writing: Issues, Arguments, Alternatives (co-written with Hans Ostrum, 1997)
- Teaching Lives: Essays Stories (1997)
- Colors of a Different Horse: Rethinking Creative Writing Theory and Pedagogy (co-written with Hans Ostrum, 1994)
- Working Words (1991)
- Something Old, Something New: College Writing Teachers and Classroom Change (1991)
