= List of British films of 1978 =

British films released in 1978

A list of films produced in the United Kingdom in 1978 (see 1978 in film):

== 1978 ==
Title	Director	Cast	Genre	Notes
1978
Absolution	Anthony Page	Richard Burton, Dominic Guard, Dai Bradley	Thriller	
Adventures of a Plumber's Mate	Stanley Long	Christopher Neil, Arthur Mullard, Stephen Lewis	Sex comedy	
The Big Sleep	Michael Winner	Robert Mitchum, Sarah Miles, John Mills	Crime drama	Co-production with US
Blood Feud	Lina Wertmüller	Sophia Loren, Marcello Mastroianni, Giancarlo Giannini	Thriller	Co-production with Italy
The Boys from Brazil	Franklin J. Schaffner	Gregory Peck, Laurence Olivier, James Mason	Thriller	Co-production with US
Capricorn One	Peter Hyams	Elliott Gould, James Brolin, Brenda Vaccaro	Thriller	Co-production with US
Carry On Emmannuelle	Gerald Thomas	Kenneth Williams, Suzanne Danielle, Joan Sims	Comedy	
The Cat and the Canary	Radley Metzger	Honor Blackman, Michael Callan, Edward Fox	Horror	Co-production with US
The Class of Miss MacMichael	Silvio Narizzano	Glenda Jackson, Oliver Reed, Rosalind Cash	Drama	
The Comeback	Pete Walker	Pamela Stephenson, David Doyle, Bill Owen	Horror	
Death on the Nile	John Guillermin	Peter Ustinov, Jane Birkin, Bette Davis, Mia Farrow	Mystery	Based on the Agatha Christie novel
The First Great Train Robbery	Michael Crichton	Sean Connery, Donald Sutherland, Lesley-Anne Down	Crime comedy	
Force 10 from Navarone	Guy Hamilton	Robert Shaw, Harrison Ford, Richard Kiel	War	Co-production with US
Give Us Tomorrow	Donovan Winter	Sylvia Syms, Derren Nesbitt, Derek Anders	Crime	
Home Before Midnight	Pete Walker	James Aubrey, Juliet Harmer, Richard Todd	Drama	
The Hound of the Baskervilles	Paul Morrissey	Peter Cook, Dudley Moore, Kenneth Williams	Comedy	
Killer's Moon	Alan Birkinshaw	Jane Hayden, David Jackson, Tom Marshall	Horror	
The Legacy	Richard Marquand	Katharine Ross, Sam Elliott, Roger Daltrey	Horror	Co-production with US
Leopard in the Snow	Gerry O'Hara	Keir Dullea, Susan Penhaligon, Billie Whitelaw	Drama	
Let's Get Laid	James Kenelm Clarke	Robin Askwith, Fiona Richmond, Linda Hayden	Sex comedy	
Long Shot	Maurice Hatton	Charles Gormley, Neville Smith, Susannah York	Drama	
The Medusa Touch	Jack Gold	Richard Burton, Lee Remick, Lino Ventura	Thriller	Co-production with France
Midnight Express	Alan Parker	Brad Davis, Randy Quaid, John Hurt	Drama	Co-production with US
The Odd Job	Peter Medak	David Jason, Graham Chapman, Diana Quick	Comedy	
The Playbirds	Willy Roe	Mary Millington, Alan Lake, Glynn Edwards	Crime	
Power Play	Martyn Burke	Peter O'Toole, David Hemmings, Donald Pleasence	Thriller	Co-production with Canada
Revenge of the Pink Panther	Blake Edwards	Peter Sellers, Robert Webber, Herbert Lom	Comedy	Co-production with US
Rosie Dixon – Night Nurse	Justin Cartwright	John Le Mesurier, Arthur Askey, Liz Fraser	Sex comedy	
The Sailor's Return	Jack Gold	Tom Bell, Denyse Alexander, Nigel Hawthorne	Drama	
The Shout	Jerzy Skolimowski	Alan Bates, Susannah York, John Hurt	Horror	
Stevie	Robert Enders	Glenda Jackson, Mona Washbourne, Trevor Howard	Biopic	
The Stud	Quentin Masters	Joan Collins, Oliver Tobias, Sue Lloyd	Drama	
Superman	Richard Donner	Christopher Reeve, Margot Kidder, Gene Hackman	Adventure	Co-production with US
Sweeney 2	Tom Clegg	John Thaw, Dennis Waterman, Denholm Elliott	Crime	Second cinematic spin-off of the TV series
Terror	Norman J. Warren	John Nolan, James Aubrey, Glynis Barber	Horror	
The Thirty Nine Steps	Don Sharp	Robert Powell, David Warner, Karen Dotrice	Thriller	Previously filmed in 1935 and 1959
Tomorrow Never Comes	Peter Collinson	Oliver Reed, Susan George, Raymond Burr	Crime	Co-production with Canada; entered into the 11th Moscow International Film Festival
Warlords of Atlantis	Kevin Connor	Doug McClure, Peter Gilmore, Shane Rimmer	Adventure/horror/sci-fi	
The Water Babies	Lionel Jeffries	James Mason, Bernard Cribbins, Billie Whitelaw	Family	Co-production with Poland; Animated film
Watership Down	Martin Rosen	John Hurt, Richard Briers, Zero Mostel	Adventure	Animated, Zero Mostel's last film
What's Up Superdoc!	Derek Ford	Christopher Mitchell, Julia Goodman, Harry H. Corbett	Comedy	
The Wild Geese	Andrew V. McLaglen	Richard Burton, Roger Moore, Richard Harris	Action	

== Documentaries and short films ==
Title	Director	Cast	Genre	Notes
Nighthawks		Ken Robertson	LGBT drama	
Sammy's Super T-Shirt	Jeremy Summers	Reggie Winch, Lawrie Mark	Family	

== Top Films at the British Box Office in 1978 ==
1. Star Wars
2. Grease
3. Close Encounters of the Third Kind
4. Saturday Night Fever
5. Revenge of the Pink Panther
6. The Rescuers
7. ABBA: The Movie
8. The Gauntlet
9. Herbie Goes to Monte Carlo
10. The Stud
11. The Deep
12. Annie Hall
13. Convoy
14. The Wild Geese
15. Warlords of Atlantis
16. Candleshoe
17. The Goodbye Girl
18. Spider-Man Strikes Back
19. Heaven Can Wait
20. Julia
21. International Velvet

== See also ==
- 1978 in British music
- 1978 in British radio
- 1978 in British television
- 1978 in the United Kingdom
