= 1978 in British music =

This is a summary of 1978 in music in the United Kingdom.

== Events ==
- 14 January – The Sex Pistols play their final show (until a reunion in 1996) at Winterland, San Francisco.
- 24 January – Wings' "Mull of Kintyre" is number one for a ninth and final week, becoming the biggest-selling single in UK history at that point.
- 25 January – Electric Light Orchestra kick off their Out of the Blue world tour in Honolulu, Hawaii.
- 11 March – Kate Bush becomes the first British female solo artist to reach number one in the UK charts with a self-written song, "Wuthering Heights".
- 30 April – The Clash, Tom Robinson Band, Steel Pulse, X-Ray Spex, the Ruts, Misty in Roots and Generation X all play live in Victoria Park, Hackney, at the Anti-Nazi League/Rock Against Racism festival, following a march from Trafalgar Square.
- 25 May – The Who play their last show with Keith Moon before his death.
- 15 July – The Picnic at Blackbushe Aerodrome, Camberley, Surrey, a concert featuring Bob Dylan, Eric Clapton and Joan Armatrading, attracts some 200,000 people.
- 30 July – Thin Lizzy officially announce that Gary Moore has replaced Brian Robertson on guitar.
- 18 August – The Who release their eighth studio album Who Are You. It is the Who's last album with Keith Moon as the drummer; Moon dies twenty days after the release of the album.
- September – Second anti-racism event staged in Brockwell Park, South London, featuring Elvis Costello, Stiff Little Fingers and Aswad, with 150,000 people in attendance.
- 12 October – Orchestral Manoeuvres in the Dark play their first ever concert, at Eric's Club in Liverpool. They are recognised as Britain's first performing, synthesizer-based duo.
- 27 November – Def Leppard's permanent drummer Rick Allen joins the band at the age of 15.
- unknown dates
  - The Bee Gees' Saturday Night Fever becomes the biggest-selling album of all time (until overtaken in 1983).
  - The first BBC Young Musician of the Year competition for classical players is won by trombonist Michael Hext.
- Operatic contralto Helen Watts is appointed a CBE.
  - Multitone Records is founded by Pranil Gohil, specialising in bhangra music.

== Charts ==
=== Number one singles ===
Date	Song	Artist
1 January	"Mull of Kintyre" / "Girls' School"	Wings
8 January	"Mull of Kintyre" / "Girls' School"	Wings
15 January	"Mull of Kintyre" / "Girls' School"	Wings
22 January	"Mull of Kintyre" / "Girls' School"	Wings
29 January	"Uptown Top Ranking"	Althea & Donna
5 February	"Figaro"	Brotherhood of Man
12 February	"Take a Chance on Me"	ABBA
19 February	"Take a Chance on Me"	ABBA
26 February	"Take a Chance on Me"	ABBA
5 March	"Wuthering Heights"	Kate Bush
12 March	"Wuthering Heights"	Kate Bush
19 March	"Wuthering Heights"	Kate Bush
26 March	"Wuthering Heights"	Kate Bush
2 April	"Matchstalk Men and Matchstalk Cats and Dogs"	Brian and Michael
9 April	"Matchstalk Men and Matchstalk Cats and Dogs"	Brian and Michael
16 April	"Matchstalk Men and Matchstalk Cats and Dogs"	Brian and Michael
23 April	"Night Fever"	Bee Gees
30 April	"Night Fever"	Bee Gees
7 May	"Rivers of Babylon"	Boney M
14 May	"Rivers of Babylon"	Boney M
21 May	"Rivers of Babylon"	Boney M
28 May	"Rivers of Babylon"	Boney M
4 June	"Rivers of Babylon"	Boney M
11 June	"You're the One That I Want"	John Travolta and Olivia Newton-John
18 June	"You're the One That I Want"	John Travolta and Olivia Newton-John
25 June	"You're the One That I Want"	John Travolta and Olivia Newton-John
2 July	"You're the One That I Want"	John Travolta and Olivia Newton-John
9 July	"You're the One That I Want"	John Travolta and Olivia Newton-John
16 July	"You're the One That I Want"	John Travolta and Olivia Newton-John
23 July	"You're the One That I Want"	John Travolta and Olivia Newton-John
30 July	"You're the One That I Want"	John Travolta and Olivia Newton-John
6 August	"You're the One That I Want"	John Travolta and Olivia Newton-John
13 August	"Three Times a Lady"	The Commodores
20 August	"Three Times a Lady"	The Commodores
27 August	"Three Times a Lady"	The Commodores
3 September	"Three Times a Lady"	The Commodores
10 September	"Three Times a Lady"	The Commodores
17 September	"Dreadlock Holiday"	10cc
24 September	"Summer Nights"	John Travolta and Olivia Newton-John
1 October	"Summer Nights"	John Travolta and Olivia Newton-John
8 October	"Summer Nights"	John Travolta and Olivia Newton-John
15 October	"Summer Nights"	John Travolta and Olivia Newton-John
22 October	"Summer Nights"	John Travolta and Olivia Newton-John
29 October	"Summer Nights"	John Travolta and Olivia Newton-John
5 November	"Summer Nights"	John Travolta and Olivia Newton-John
12 November	"Rat Trap"	The Boomtown Rats
19 November	"Rat Trap"	The Boomtown Rats
26 November	"Da Ya Think I'm Sexy?"	Rod Stewart
3 December	"Mary's Boy Child – Oh My Lord"	Boney M
10 December	"Mary's Boy Child – Oh My Lord"	Boney M
17 December	"Mary's Boy Child – Oh My Lord"	Boney M
24 December	"Mary's Boy Child – Oh My Lord"	Boney M
31 December	"Y.M.C.A."	The Village People

=== Number one albums ===
Date	Album	Artist	Weeks
7 January	Disco Fever	Various Artists	2
14 January	Disco Fever	Various Artists	2
21 January	The Sound of Bread	Bread	1
28 January	Rumours	Fleetwood Mac	1
4 February	The Album	ABBA	7
11 February	The Album	ABBA	7
18 February	The Album	ABBA	7
25 February	The Album	ABBA	7
4 March	The Album	ABBA	7
11 March	The Album	ABBA	7
18 March	The Album	ABBA	7
25 March	20 Golden Greats	Buddy Holly and The Crickets	3
1 April	20 Golden Greats	Buddy Holly and The Crickets	3
8 April	20 Golden Greats	Buddy Holly and The Crickets	3
15 April	20 Golden Greats	Nat 'King' Cole	3
22 April	20 Golden Greats	Nat 'King' Cole	3
29 April	20 Golden Greats	Nat 'King' Cole	3
6 May	Saturday Night Fever	Original Soundtrack	18
13 May	Saturday Night Fever	Original Soundtrack	18
20 May	Saturday Night Fever	Original Soundtrack	18
27 May	Saturday Night Fever	Original Soundtrack	18
3 June	Saturday Night Fever	Original Soundtrack	18
10 June	Saturday Night Fever	Original Soundtrack	18
17 June	Saturday Night Fever	Original Soundtrack	18
24 June	Saturday Night Fever	Original Soundtrack	18
1 July	Saturday Night Fever	Original Soundtrack	18
8 July	Saturday Night Fever	Original Soundtrack	18
15 July	Saturday Night Fever	Original Soundtrack	18
22 July	Saturday Night Fever	Original Soundtrack	18
29 July	Saturday Night Fever	Original Soundtrack	18
5 August	Saturday Night Fever	Original Soundtrack	18
12 August	Saturday Night Fever	Original Soundtrack	18
19 August	Saturday Night Fever	Original Soundtrack	18
26 August	Saturday Night Fever	Original Soundtrack	18
2 September	Saturday Night Fever	Original Soundtrack	18
9 September	Nightflight to Venus	Boney M	4
16 September	Nightflight to Venus	Boney M	4
23 September	Nightflight to Venus	Boney M	4
30 September	Nightflight to Venus	Boney M	4
7 October	Grease	Original Soundtrack	13
14 October	Grease	Original Soundtrack	13
21 October	Grease	Original Soundtrack	13
28 October	Grease	Original Soundtrack	13
4 November	Grease	Original Soundtrack	13
11 November	Grease	Original Soundtrack	13
18 November	Grease	Original Soundtrack	13
25 November	Grease	Original Soundtrack	13
2 December	Grease	Original Soundtrack	13
9 December	Grease	Original Soundtrack	13
16 December	Grease	Original Soundtrack	13
23 December	Grease	Original Soundtrack	13
30 December	Grease	Original Soundtrack	13

== Year-end charts ==
The tables below include sales between 31 December 1977 and 30 December 1978: the year-end charts reproduced in the issue of Music Week dated 23 December 1978 and played on Radio 1 on 31 December 1978 only include sales figures up until 16 December 1978.

=== Best-selling singles ===
No.	Title	Artist	Peak position
1	"Rivers of Babylon"/"Brown Girl in the Ring"	Boney M	1
2	"You're the One That I Want"	John Travolta and Olivia Newton-John	1
3	"Summer Nights"	John Travolta and Olivia Newton-John	1
4	"Three Times a Lady"	The Commodores	1
5	"The Smurf Song"	Father Abraham and the Smurfs	2
6	"Mary's Boy Child – Oh My Lord"	Boney M	1
7	"Night Fever"	Bee Gees	1
8	"Rat Trap"	The Boomtown Rats	1
9	"Take a Chance on Me"	ABBA	1
10	"Matchstalk Men and Matchstalk Cats and Dogs"	Brian and Michael	1
11	"Dreadlock Holiday"	10cc	1
12	"Wuthering Heights"	Kate Bush	1
13	"Sandy"	John Travolta	2
14	"Rasputin"	Boney M	2
15	"Substitute"	Clout	2
16	"Denis"	Blondie	2
17	"Baker Street"	Gerry Rafferty	3
18	"Da Ya Think I'm Sexy?"	Rod Stewart	1
19	"Figaro"	Brotherhood of Man	1
20	"Come Back My Love"	Darts	2
21	"Love Don't Live Here Anymore"	Rose Royce	2
22	"Mull of Kintyre"/"Girls' School"	Wings	1
23	"It's Raining"	Darts	2
24	"Wishing on a Star"	Rose Royce	3
25	"Lucky Stars"	Dean Friedman	3
26	"Dancing in the City"	Marshall Hain	3
27	"Boogie Oogie Oogie"	A Taste of Honey	3
28	"Oh What a Circus"	David Essex	3
29	"Grease"	Frankie Valli	3
30	"Jilted John"	Jilted John	4
31	"Y.M.C.A."	Village People	2 (Note: Reached number 1 in 1979)
32	"Annie's Song"	James Galway	3
33	"Stayin' Alive"	Bee Gees	4
34	"Too Much, Too Little, Too Late"	Johnny Mathis and Deniece Williams	3
35	"The Boy from New York City"	Darts	2
36	"Hopelessly Devoted to You"	Olivia Newton-John	2
37	"Blame It on the Boogie"	The Jacksons	8
38	"Darlin'"	Frankie Miller	6
39	"Never Let Her Slip Away"	Andrew Gold	5
40	"Sweet Talkin' Woman"	Electric Light Orchestra	6
41	"If I Had Words"	Scott Fitzgerald and Yvonne Keeley with the St Thomas More School Choir	3
42	"I Can't Stand the Rain"	Eruption featuring Precious Wilson	5
43	"Mr. Blue Sky"	Electric Light Orchestra	6
44	"Uptown Top Ranking"	Althea and Donna	1
45	"MacArthur Park"	Donna Summer	5
46	"I Wonder Why"	Showaddywaddy	2
47	"You Make Me Feel (Mighty Real)"	Sylvester	8
48	"If You Can't Give Me Love"	Suzi Quatro	4
49	"A Taste of Aggro"	The Barron Knights	3
50	"Forever Autumn"	Justin Hayward	5

=== Best-selling albums ===
No.	Title	Artist	Peak position
1	Saturday Night Fever	Original Soundtrack	1
2	Grease	Original Soundtrack	1
3	The Album	ABBA	1
4	Nightflight to Venus	Boney M	1
5	20 Golden Greats	Nat 'King' Cole	1
6	Rumours	Fleetwood Mac	1
7	Out of the Blue	Electric Light Orchestra	5 (Note: Reached number 4 in 1977)
8	Jeff Wayne's Musical Version of The War of the Worlds	Jeff Wayne	5
9	Images	Don Williams	2
10	20 Golden Greats	Buddy Holly & the Crickets	1
11	The Kick Inside	Kate Bush	3
12	And Then There Were Three	Genesis	3
13	Classic Rock	London Symphony Orchestra	3
14	New Boots and Panties!!	Ian Dury	8 (Note: Reached number 5 in 1979)
15	Live and Dangerous	Thin Lizzy	2
16	Reflections	Andy Williams	2
17	The Sound of Bread	Bread	1
18	The Singles: 1974–1978	The Carpenters	2
19	Street-Legal	Bob Dylan	2
20	A Tonic for the Troops	The Boomtown Rats	8
21	20 Golden Greats	The Hollies	2
22	The Stud	Original Soundtrack	2
23	City to City	Gerry Rafferty	6
24	The Big Wheels of Motown	Various Artists	2
25	You Light Up My Life	Johnny Mathis	3
26	Greatest Hits (1976-1978)	Showaddywaddy	4 (Note: Reached number 1 in 1979)
27	20 Golden Greats	Neil Diamond	2
28	Bat Out of Hell	Meat Loaf	11 (Note: Reached number 9 in 1981)
29	London Town	Wings	4
30	Emotions	Various Artists	2
31	Midnight Hustle	Various Artists	5
32	Some Girls	The Rolling Stones	2
33	Variations	Andrew Lloyd Webber	2
34	Pastiche	The Manhattan Transfer	10
35	Greatest Hits	ABBA	12 (Note: Reached number 1 in 1976)
36	Kaya	Bob Marley and the Wailers	4
37	Blondes Have More Fun	Rod Stewart	3
38	Parallel Lines	Blondie	7 (Note: Reached number 1 in 1979)
39	Foot Loose & Fancy Free	Rod Stewart	4 (Note: Reached number 3 in 1977)
40	Plastic Letters	Blondie	10
41	Arrival	ABBA	12 (Note: Reached number 1 in 1976)
42	Black and White	The Stranglers	2
43	20 Giant Hits	The Nolan Sisters	3
44	The Greatest Hits of Donna Summer	Donna Summer	4
45	Natural High	The Commodores	8
46	This Year's Model	Elvis Costello and the Attractions	4
47	Anytime...Anywhere	Rita Coolidge	6
48	Octave	The Moody Blues	6
49	A Single Man	Elton John	8
50	Bloody Tourists	10cc	3

== Classical music: new works ==
- Malcolm Arnold – Symphony No. 8
- Peter Maxwell Davies – Symphony no. 1
- Daniel Jones – String Quartet No 4
- Malcolm Williamson
  - Azure
  - Fiesta

== Film and Incidental music ==
- Tony Banks – The Shout, starring Alan Bates, Susannah York and John Hurt.
- Roy Budd – The Wild Geese.
- Ron Goodwin – Force 10 from Navarone directed by Guy Hamilton, starring Robert Shaw and Edward Fox.
- Ed Welch – The Thirty Nine Steps, starring Robert Powell.

== Births ==
- 1 January – Tarik O'Regan, composer
- 13 January – Shelley Nash, singer (Girls@Play)
- 15 January – Sandi Lee Hughes, singer (allSTARS*)
- 19 January – Wayne Williams, singer (Another Level)
- 13 February – Hamish Glencross, Scottish guitarist
- 14 February – Ryan Griffiths (The Vines)
- 22 February – Jenny Frost, singer (Atomic Kitten)
- 6 April – Myleene Klass, singer (Hear'Say), radio and TV presenter
- 7 April – Duncan James, singer (Blue)
- 9 April – Rachel Stevens, singer (S Club 7)
- 16 April – Terry Daly, Irish singer (Mytown)
- 23 April – Tom Lowe, singer and keyboardist (North and South)
- 25 April – Luke Bedford, composer
- 28 April – Lauren Laverne, singer, radio DJ and TV presenter
- 4 May – Matthew Rose, bass
- 22 May – Jordan, model and would-be singer
- 29 May
  - Adam Rickitt, singer and actor
  - Daniel Pearce, singer (One True Voice)
- 6 June – Sophie Solomon, violinist
- 16 June – Elisa Cariera, American-born singer (Solid HarmoniE)
- 4 July – Stephen McNally, English singer-songwriter (BBMak)
- 1 August – Jonathan Wilkes, singer and entertainer
- 21 August – John Paul "J-Rock" Horsley, American-born singer (Big Brovaz)
- 3 September – Johnny Shentall, singer (Boom!)
- 15 September – David Sneddon, singer-songwriter
- 27 September – Jamie Benson, singer (Hepburn)
- 7 October – Alesha Dixon, singer (Mis-Teeq)
- 9 October
  - Nicky Byrne, Irish singer (Westlife)
  - Beverley Fullen, drummer (Hepburn)
- 26 October – Rachael Carr, singer (Boom!)
- 27 October – Sabrina Washington, singer (Mis-Teeq)
- 29 October – Sam Chapman, singer and keyboardist (North and South)
- 1 November – Bobak Kianovsh, singer (Another Level)
- 7 November – Mark Read, singer (A1)
- 23 November – Randy Brown, Jamaican-born singer (Big Brovaz)
- 27 November – Mike Skinner, rapper, musician and record producer
- 12 December – Paul Walker, Irish singer (Mytown)
- 18 December – Lindsay Armaou, Greek-born Irish-based singer (B*Witched)
- date unknown – Oliver Weeks, composer, arranger and guitarist

== Deaths ==
- 11 January – William John Edwards, Cerdd Dant singer (b. 1898)
- 15 January – Jack Jackson, trumpeter, bandleader and radio disc jockey (b. 1906)
- 24 February – Mrs Mills, pianist (b. 1918; heart attack)
- 9 March – L. Radley Flynn, singer and actor (b. 1902)
- 12 March – Tolchard Evans, songwriter, composer, pianist and bandleader (b. 1901)
- 3 April – Ray Noble, composer and bandleader (b. 1903)
- 21 April – Sandy Denny, singer (Fairport Convention) (b. 1947) (cerebral haemorrhage)
- 14 August – Victor Silvester, dance band leader (b. 1900)
- 7 September
  - Keith Moon, drummer of The Who (b. 1946) (Clomethiazole overdose)
  - Charles Williams, composer (b. 1893)
- 15 September – Robert Bruce Montgomery, writer and composer (b. 1921)
- 13 December – Jack Doyle, Irish-born boxer and singer (b. 1913; cirrhosis of liver)

== See also ==
- 1978 in British radio
- 1978 in British television
- 1978 in the United Kingdom
- List of British films of 1978
