= The War of Darkie Pilbeam =

1968 British TV drama series

The War of Darkie Pilbeam was a three-part period drama set in the North of England during World War II, which originally aired on British television in 1968. It was written by Coronation Street creator Tony Warren and produced by Richard Everitt for Granada Television. The programme was broadcast on Friday nights.

The title character, Darkie Pilbeam, (Trevor Bannister), a none too successful petty crook, managed to rise to the top of his profession by running a profitable black-market operation. Inevitably, Pilbeam's world crashed and burned, but it was fun while it lasted.

The series was shown in three 60 minute episodes on ITV (with commercial breaks), which were titled:

- "Phase I – September 1939" (originally broadcast 12 July 1968)
- "Phase II – June 1942" (originally broadcast 19 July 1968)
- "Phase III – August 1945" (originally broadcast 26 July 1968)

== Cast ==
- Trevor Bannister as Darkie Pilbeam
- Sheila Raynor as Vera Dobson
- Christine Hargreaves as Marie Pilbeam
- Rhoda Lewis as Laura Pilbeam
- Terry Gilligan as Colin Pilbeam
- George Waring as Tommy Dobson
- Gabrielle Daye as Nell Perrott
- Caroline Dowdeswell as Jeanette Perrott
- Maggie Don as Louise Perrott
- John Collin as Ted Pilbeam
- Alan Browning as Ned Boston
- Julie Goodyear as Waitress
- Roy Barraclough as Bent Harry
- Lynne Carol as Mrs Cloth
- John Barrett as Toddy Bartholomew
- David Jackson as Civilian Policeman
- Stephen Yardley as Wolfgang
