= The Dustbinmen =

British TV sitcom (1969–1970)

- Genre: Comedy
- Created by: Jack Rosenthal
- Written by: Jack Rosenthal; John Antrobus; Kenneth Cope; Adele Rose; Tom Brennand; Roy Bottomley; Dave Freeman; David Hodson; Jim Andrew
- Directed by: Les Chatfield.
- Starring: Graham Haberfield; Bryan Pringle; Trevor Bannister; Tim Wylton; John Barrett
- Country of origin: United Kingdom
- Original language: English
- No. of series: 3
- No. of episodes: 20

Production
- Producers: Jack Rosenthal Series 1. Richard Everett Series 2 and 3.
- Running time: 30 minutes
- Production company: Granada Television

Original release
- Network: ITV
- Release: 23 September 1969 – 31 August 1970

The Dustbinmen is a British television sitcom made by Granada Television for ITV, which starred Bryan Pringle, Trevor Bannister, Graham Haberfield and Tim Wylton. The show was a spin-off from a one-off 90-minute television film There's a Hole in Your Dustbin, Delilah (1968) written by Jack Rosenthal and directed by Michael Apted. This led to the sitcom which ran for three series between 1969 and 1970.

Rosenthal wrote all of the episodes of the first series and, according to the insert in the Network DVD release, all the episodes of the second series too. However, the title credits for Episode 6 of Season 2 name the writers as Tom Brennand and Roy Bottomley.

== Main characters ==
Cheese and Egg, Heavy Breathing, Winston Platt and Eric are the crew of dustcart 'Thunderbird 3' of the Corporation Cleansing Department—the name a reference to the spacecraft in Thunderbirds. Also known as 'Number 3 Gang', throughout the day they collect dustbins and treat each other, or anyone else, with rudeness and disdain. Cheese and Egg, whose real name is C. E. Petty, is a fervent communist and the natural-born leader of the gang; with his knowledge, the gang can escape sticky situations if they are lucky. Heavy Breathing, "the one with the good looks", is obliged to spend much of his time pleasuring housewives – something he finds quite annoying when he would prefer to be resting. Winston Platt, a die-hard fan of Manchester City, views player Colin Bell as a god. Welsh Eric, the more sensitive Coronation Street-fan, spends most of the time talking about television and saving to buy a colour TV for his mother.

== Other characters ==
The Cleansing Department's inspector is always known as Bloody Delilah regardless of who he is. He keeps the nickname because, according to Cheese and Egg in episode 2.1, "They're all bloody Delilahs". Another character, who appeared in all 20 episodes, was Smellie Ibbotson. He starts as the scavenger on the tips but is later promoted to be Bloody Delilah's lapdog, reporting on who was skiving and what they are up to. Not everyone likes Smellie, not just because he was smelly, but also because he is difficult to understand (as he has no teeth).

== Episodes ==
=== Series 1 (1969) ===
- Beside the Seaside (23 September 1969) Written by Jack Rosenthal.
- Banned from the Football? (30 September 1969) Written by Jack Rosenthal.
- The 500,000th Bin (7 October 1969) Written by Jack Rosenthal.
- Fog (14 October 1969) Written by Jack Rosenthal.
- The Annual Election (21 October 1969) Written by Jack Rosenthal.
- One Woman Resists Heavy Breathing (28 October 1969) Written by Jack Rosenthal.

=== Series 2 (1970) ===
- Cheese and Egg in Charge (24 Mar 1970) Written by Jack Rosenthal.
- Winston's Debt (31 March 1970) Written by Jack Rosenthal.
- Thunderbird 3 in a NHS Ward (7 April 1970) Written by Jack Rosenthal.
- Miss Potter and the English Lessons (14 April 1970) Written by Jack Rosenthal.
- Eric in Love (21 April 1970) Written by Jack Rosenthal.
- Cheese and Egg Becomes Holy (28 April 1970) Written by Tom Brennand and Roy Bottomley.
- Delilah's Stag Party (5 May 1970) Written by Jack Rosenthal.

=== Series 3 (1970) ===
- Up For Auction (20 Jul 70) Written by Dave Freeman.
- Eric Llewellyn For Mayor (27 Jul 70) Written by Adele Rose.
- Sir Henry's Funeral (3 Aug 70) Written by David Hodson.
- Deputy Inspector Ibbotson (10 Aug 70) Written by Dave Freeman.
- A Military Exercise (17 Aug 70) Written by Jim Andrew.
- Stolen Wages (24 Aug 70) Written by Kenneth Cope.
- Contraband (31 Aug 70) Written by John Antrobus.

== Cast ==
| Character | There's a Hole in Your Dustbin, Delilah | Series 1 | Series 2 | Series 3 |
|---|---|---|---|---|
| C.E. "Cheese & Egg" Petty | Jack MacGowran | Bryan Pringle | Bryan Pringle | Bryan Pringle |
| Heavy Breathing | Harold Innocent | Trevor Bannister | Trevor Bannister | Trevor Bannister |
| Winston Platt | Graham Haberfield | Graham Haberfield | Graham Haberfield | Graham Haberfield |
| Eric Llewellyn | Henry Livings | Tim Wylton | Tim Wylton | Tim Wylton |
| Bloody Delilah | Frank Windsor (Trevalyan Sinclair) | John Woodvine (Mr Sinclair) | Brian Wilde (Bernard Pooke) | Brian Wilde (Bernard Pooke) |
| Smellie Ibbotson | John Barrett | John Barrett | John Barrett | John Barrett |

== Links with other programmes ==
The Dustbinmen has links with other programmes, many of which were also made by Granada Television.

Coronation Street was mentioned a few times by Eric; Graham Haberfield, aka Winston went on to play Jerry Booth in the show. Julie Goodyear appeared in two episodes as a housewife; she later played Bet Lynch. Barbara Knox (at that time Mullaney) who later played Rita Littlewood/Fairclough/Sullivan/Tanner played a housewife who read tea leaves. Jill Summers (Phyllis Pearce) played a cleaner in one episode. Peter Dudley (Bert Tilsley) appeared as a man in a hospital corridor in one episode and Bryan Mosley (Alf Roberts) once appeared as a doctor. Furthermore, the opening and closing titles contain a recurring motif of a flower in a discarded beercan; "Newton and Ridley" (the Rovers Return brewers) is printed on this beercan.

Jack Rosenthal left the show to concentrate on developing another Granada sitcom, The Lovers, which co-starred Paula Wilcox. She appeared in two episodes of The Dustbinmen as Naomi, Winston's girlfriend.

There are links with Last of the Summer Wine too. Brian Wilde, who played the final Bloody Delilah, played Walter Foggy Dewhurst in the programme. John Comer who played Sid in the programme, once played a policeman in The Dustbinmen and Trevor Bannister has a recurring role as the golf club captain Toby Mulberry Smith. Also, Trevor Bannister would later appear (1972–1979) in Are You Being Served?.

In 1988 Brian Wilde starred with Trevor Bannister in the BBC1 show Wyatt's Watchdogs, a short-lived sitcom about bickering neighbours trying to run a Neighbourhood Watch scheme.

== Preservation and home media ==
- The original play was shot on black and white film, apparently 16mm.
- Except for the animated titles, series 1 was shot entirely on black and white 405-line videotape.
- All subsequent episodes, including a short Christmas sketch, were made on colour videotape with exterior scenes shot on 16mm.
- Only the first episode of series 2 has survived in its colour version; the rest of the 6 episodes of series 2 are preserved on black and white 16mm telerecordings with optical sound. These were obviously made for overseas sales, since the opening Granada Television logo is replaced with the logo screen and copyright for Granada Television International.
- Except for two episodes believed wiped, Series 3 and the Christmas sketch survive on colour videotape stock of widely varying quality.

In 2005 the sole surviving material was released on Region 2 DVD by Network DVD.

== Trivia ==
The show used "pseudo-profanity". Like the later show Porridge, its characters would be expected to swear frequently, but at the time most swear words were forbidden in scripts, especially sitcoms. The characters frequently used the word "piggin'" and the phrase "bog off", as an all purpose substitute for swearing, just as characters in Porridge used the word "naff". There was almost more controversy over this than over actual swearing, with accusations of cowardice on the one hand, and complaints about the "made up" swear words on the other.

== See also ==
- Common As Muck – BBC comedy drama serial about the lives of a crew of binmen (1994 and 1997)
