= Trevor Bannister =

British actor (1934–2011)

- Bannister in Are You Being Served?
- Born: Trevor Gordon Bannister; 14 August 1934; Durrington, Wiltshire, England
- Died: 14 April 2011 (aged 76); Thames Ditton, Surrey, England
- Occupation: Actor
- Years active: 1956–2011
- Television: The War of Darkie Pilbeam; The Dustbinmen; Are You Being Served? Last of the Summer Wine
- Spouses: Kathleen Cravos (m. 1959, divorced) Pamela Carson (m. 1982)
- Children: 3

Trevor Gordon Bannister (14 August 1934 – 14 April 2011) was a British actor. He was best known for having played the womanising and wisecracking junior salesman Mr Lucas in the sitcom Are You Being Served? from 1972 to 1979, and for his role as Toby Mulberry Smith in the long-running sitcom Last of the Summer Wine, from 2001 until it ended its run in 2010.

== Career ==
In 1960, Bannister appeared on stage at the Cambridge Theatre in London in Billy Liar, which starred Albert Finney. He starred as Darkie Pilbeam, a wartime spiv, in the 1968 television series The War of Darkie Pilbeam; from 1969 to 1970, he appeared as "Heavy Breathing" in Jack Rosenthal's sitcom, The Dustbinmen. Shortly afterwards, he was asked to play Mr. Lucas in a Comedy Playhouse pilot called Are You Being Served? and took the part in the series. It was originally intended as a vehicle for him as the average man caught up in the store full of odd characters and baroque customs and, for the first five series, he received top billing every other episode, alternating with Mollie Sugden. However, as it developed into more of an ensemble piece, he found his role (and his billing) being reduced as other characters developed. The BBC cancelled the show in 1979; when it was revived in 1981, Bannister was performing in a stage play that clashed with filming dates for the new series. The BBC refused to move the filming dates to a time when Bannister was available, which led to him being replaced in the show by Mike Berry.

In 1972, he appeared as the weak-bladdered producer of a local theatre company in Steptoe and Son, Episode 2 series 7 – "A Star is Born". He played Peter Pitt in the 1988 BBC sitcom Wyatt's Watchdogs. Other TV appearances include Keeping Up Appearances as the kitchen salesman, and he also appeared in Call Earnshaw, Gideon's Way, The Saint, The Tomorrow People, Only on Sunday and The Avengers. Bannister played three different characters in the ITV soap Coronation Street. From 2001, he played a recurring character (The Golf Captain) in Last of the Summer Wine. He became a series regular in 2009, coinciding with the 30th series. Finally receiving a name ("Toby Mulbery-Smith"), he moved next door to Barry and Glenda (Mike Grady and Sarah Thomas), and befriended Morton (Christopher Beeny).

Although Bannister appeared in a few films including Reach for the Sky (1956), Au Pair Girls (1972) and the film version of Are You Being Served? (1977), he worked mostly in the theatre, with credits including Billy Liar and the farce Move Over, Mrs Markham. Bannister also performed in Shakespeare and was a regular in pantomime for more than 35 years, nearly always playing the dame. In 2007, he guest starred in the Doctor Who audio adventure Nocturne.

His final appearance was in the TV series New Tricks episode "Old Fossils" broadcast 4 July 2011.

== Personal life and death ==
Bannister was the youngest of three siblings. His first marriage was to actress Kathleen Cravos in 1959. They had three sons together (Simon, Timothy and Jeremy) and later divorced. He married Pamela Carson in 1982.

Bannister died on 14 April 2011, aged 76, after a heart attack at his allotment in Thames Ditton, Surrey. Are You Being Served? and Last of the Summer Wine co-star Frank Thornton said that the last event Bannister attended was Thornton's 90th birthday on 15 January 2011, three months before Bannister died. Two of his sons followed him into show business: Simon as a theatre stage manager and Jeremy as a producer of commercials and pop videos.

== Acting credits ==
=== Film ===
Year	Title	Role	Notes
1956	Reach for the Sky	Young Officer	uncredited
1965	One Way Pendulum	Groomkirby's Co-Worker	uncredited
1972	Au Pair Girls	Photographer	
1977	Are You Being Served?	Mr. Lucas	
1992	Hostage	Mason	
1999	Captain Jack	Holiday-maker	

=== Television ===
Year	Title	Role	Notes
1960	The Secret Kingdom	Journalist	Episode: #1.3
1960	Theatre Night	Arthur Crabtree	Episode: "Billy Liar"
1962	Z-Cars	Second Boy	Episode: "The Five Whistles"
1963	Moonstrike	Flight Lt. Ronald Lee	4 episodes
1963	Compact	Floor Manager	2 episodes
1964	Love Story	Mechanic	Episode: "The Human Element"
1964	Sergeant Cork	Clem Butley	Episode: "The Case of Big Ben Lewis"
1964	Story Parade	Phil Tombs	Episode: "The Man Who Won the Pools"
1964	Catch Hand	William Collins	Episode: "It's Never the Same"
1964	It's a Woman's World	Milkman	Episode: "Laura"
1964	ITV Play of the Week	Cledwyn Williams	Episode: "Undercurrent"
1965	The Villains	Red	Episode: "A Joker for Your Button Hole"
1965	Thursday Theatre	Jack Lucas	Episode: "Celebration"
1965	Meet the Wife	Police Constable	Episode: "The Ring"
1965	Lil	Dr. Richardson	Episode: "The Surgery"
1965	Our Man at St. Mark's	Frederick Barrett	Episode: "One"
1965	Z-Cars	Billy Dunn	Episode: "One Good Turn"
1965	The Wednesday Thriller	Archie	Episode: "The Imposter"
1965	Object Z	Peter Barry	All 6 episodes
1966	Dr. Finlay's Casebook	Harry Vincent	Episode: "Miss Letitia"
1966	No Hiding Place	Eddie Bates	Episode: "The Lifer"
1966	ITV Play of the Week	John Thomas Raynor	Episode: "Tickets Please"
1966	Object Z Returns	Peter Barry	All 6 episodes
1966	The Man in Room 17	Martin Fowler	Episode: "The Black Witch"
1966	Gideon's Way	P.C. John Moss	Episode: "The Reluctant Witness"
1966	Mrs Thursday	Harold Wright	2 episodes
1966	Softly, Softly	Mr. Barton	Episode: "Best Out of Three"
1966	The Informer	Porter	Episode: "Don't Call Us, We'll Call You"
1966	Intrigue	Syrett	Episode: "It Pays to Pick Brains"
1966	Thirty-Minute Theatre	Basil	Episode: "O-Goshi"
1967	Turn Out the Lights	Ricky Dean	Episode: "A Big Hand for a Little Lady"
1967	The Avengers	Gordon	Episode: "Something Nasty in the Nursery"
1967	No Hiding Place	Johnny Cooper	Episode: "Gentle Persuasion"
1967	ITV Play of the Week	Brian Miller	Episode: "Travelling Light"
1967	Dixon of Dock Green	Eddie Farrell	Episode: "The Climber"
1968	Softly, Softly	Elgin	Episode: "In Bulk"
1968	The Troubleshooters	Bob Plater	Episode: "A Girl to Warm Your Feet On"
1968	ITV Playhouse	Joseph Pyne	Episode: "Rogues' Gallery: The Tale of Lancelot Wishart"
1968	Champion House	Lenny Carter	Episode: "Guilty"
1968	Public Eye	Briers	Episode: "Cross That Palm When We Come to It"
1968	Orlando	Toulouse Quelquechose	4 episodes
1968	Television Theatre from...	Gareth	Episode: "Zombie"
1968	The War of Darkie Pilbeam	Darkie Pilbeam	All 3 episodes
1968	Her Majesty's Pleasure	Flash Moseley	Episode: "Thanks for the Memory"
1969	The Saint	Johnny Fox	Episode: "Portrait of Brenda"
1969	Softly, Softly	Dennington	Episode: "Critical Path"
1969	Z-Cars	Ned Corby	2 episodes
1969	Thirty-Minute Theatre	Jacko	Episode: "The Victims: A Degree of Stress"
1969–1970	The Dustbinmen	Heavy Breathing	All 21 episodes
1969	Plays of Today	Japhet	Episode: "A Voyage Round My Father"
1970	Two D's and a Dog	Captain Byng	Episode: "Military Pickles"
1971	Doomwatch	Dr. Anthony Lewis	Episode: "Public Enemy"
1971	It's Awfully Bad for Your Eyes, Darling	Eldred	Episode: "The Man Who Came to Dinner"
1971	Cider with Rosie	Father	TV film
1972	Steptoe and Son	Rupert Ffaines-Muir	Episode: "A Star Is Born"
1972	Country Matters	Arthur Dagnall	Episode: "The Sullens Sisters"
1972	Coronation Street	Ritchie	2 episodes
1972–1979	Are You Being Served?	Mr. Lucas	48 episodes
1974	Armchair Theatre	Mike	Episode: "If You Could See What I Can See"
1975	The Tomorrow People	Colonel Masters	4 Episodes: "Secret Weapon"
1994	Keeping Up Appearances	Salesman	Episode: "Angel Gabriel Blue"
1996	Silent Witness	Gary's Solicitor	Season 1 Episode 1 Part 2
2001–2010	Last of the Summer Wine	Toby Mulberry-Smith	24 episodes
2006	Coronation Street	Solicitor	5 episodes
2009	Casualty	Mr. Walter	Episode: "Midday Sun"
2011	New Tricks	Bob Ruxton	Episode: "Old Fossils"

=== Theatre ===
Year	Title	Venue	Notes
1957	The Touch of Fear	Newquay Theatre, Newquay	
1960	Billy Liar	Cambridge Theatre, London	
1966	Early One Morning	Arts Theatre, London	
1973	Move Over, Mrs Markham	Vaudeville Theatre, London	
1975	The Mating Game	Theatre Royal, Windsor	
1981-82	Dick Whittington and his Cat	Beck Theatre, Hayes	
1982	Clouds	Theatre Royal, Windsor	
1983	Hobson's Choice	Theatre Royal, Bath	
1983	The Birthday Suite	Redgrave Theatre, Farnham	
1983	The Mating Game	Theatre Royal, Windsor	
1983-84	Aladdin	Festival Theatre, Chichester	
1984	The Birthday Suite	Beck Theatre, Hayes	
1984-85	Aladdin	Congress Theatre, Eastbourne	
1985	Suddenly at home	New Theatre, Cardiff	
1987	Your place or mine?	Yvonne Arnaud Theatre, Guildford	
1988-89	Aladdin	Theatre Royal, Margate	
1989-90	Cinderella	Theatre Royal, Margate	
1990-91	Cinderella	Theatre Royal, St Helens	
1991-92	Jack and the Beanstalk	Wyvern Theatre, Swindon	
1994	The Good Times Will Come	Old Red Lion Theatre, London	
1994	Funny Money	Thorndike Theatre, Leatherhead	
1995	Seaside Postcard	Pier Theatre, Bournemouth	
1996	Funny Money	Playhouse Theatre, London	
1997-98	Jack and the Beanstalk	Harlequin Theatre, Redhill	
1998-99	Jack and the Beanstalk	Yvonne Arnaud Theatre, Guildford	
1999-00	Aladdin	Yvonne Arnaud Theatre, Guildford	
2000	Caught in the Net	Theatre Royal, Windsor	
