= Julie Goodyear =

English actress (born 1942)

Julie Goodyear MBE
- Born: Julie Kemp; 29 March 1942 (age 84); Heywood, Lancashire, England
- Occupation: Actress
- Years active: 1965–2019
- Known for: Role of Bet Lynch in Coronation Street
- Spouses: Ray Sutcliffe (m. 1959; div. 1963) Tony Rudman (m. 1973; ann. 1974) Richard Skrob (m. 1985; div. 1987) Scott Brand (m. 2007)
- Children: 1

Julie Goodyear (née Kemp; born 29 March 1942) is an English retired actress. She is known for portraying Bet Lynch in the long-running ITV soap opera Coronation Street. She first appeared as Bet for nine episodes in 1966, before becoming a series regular from 1970 to 1995. She returned for eight episodes in 2002 and another seven in 2003. For her role on Coronation Street, she received the Special Recognition Award at the 1995 National Television Awards. She was made an MBE in the 1996 New Year Honours.

== Early life ==
Goodyear was born on 29 March 1942 in Heywood, Lancashire, to Alice (née Duckworth) and George Kemp, who divorced when Goodyear was six years old. Her mother remarried to William Goodyear in 1949, whom she knew as her father and whose surname she adopted. Goodyear was brought up by her maternal grandmother, Elizabeth Duckworth, who died by drowning when Goodyear was thirteen years old.

== Career ==
=== Early work ===
Goodyear began modelling in the 1960s, predominantly as hand and foot model, which led to her acting debut in 1965, portraying the uncredited role of Charity in the first series of the ITV sitcom Pardon the Expression. The following year, she appeared in the second series on a further three occasions as separate minor characters. Between 1965 and 1966, she appeared as Duckie in two episodes of the crime drama The Man in Room 17 and also featured in one of ITV's Play of the Week in 1966.

=== Coronation Street ===
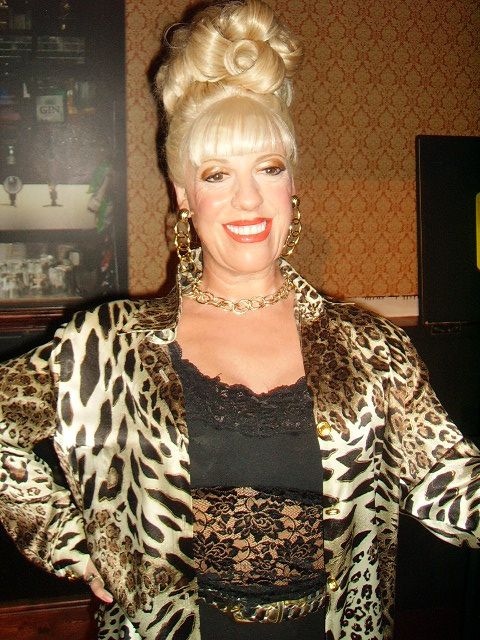
A waxwork of Goodyear as her Coronation Street character Bet Lynch

Goodyear is known for playing barmaid Bet Lynch on the ITV1 soap opera Coronation Street. After appearing as an extra the previous year, she started playing the role for a brief time in 1966, but left when senior cast member Pat Phoenix (who played Elsie Tanner) advised her to get some more training. It was at that time she joined Oldham's Repertory Theatre and went on to appear in episodes of various television series including Mr. Rose and The Fellows in 1967, City '68, Spindoe, The War of Darkie Pilbeam and appeared as Sandra in Granada Television's sitcom Nearest and Dearest in 1968, as well as Her Majesty's Pleasure, The Contenders and Kes in 1969. She appeared in two episodes of The Dustbinmen between 1969 and 1970, and portrayed Mrs. Powner in an episode of A Family At War.

Goodyear returned to Coronation Street in 1970 and remained in the series for 25 years. She quit Coronation Street in 1995, shortly after winning the Lifetime Achievement Award for her role as Bet Lynch in the first ever National Television Awards. She returned to the role of Bet in 1999 for the home video spin-off The Rover Returns.

In 2002, it was announced that Goodyear would be returning to the show after seven years away. Goodyear's return was intended to be permanent and she had signed a year's contract, however she was forced to quit after seventeen days due to the intense filming schedule, which had left her suffering from exhaustion. She returned to the show again in 2003, though this time, her appearances were part of a storyline set in Blackpool that involved Liz McDonald (Beverley Callard) and her husband Jim (Charles Lawson), who had recently escaped from prison. These transpired to be Goodyear's final scenes in the show.

=== Career after Coronation Street ===
In 1996, she signed a deal for advertisements for Shredded Wheat. Her other work included filming a pilot of The Julie Goodyear Show for Granada, presenting Live Time on the Granada Breeze network every week day throughout January 1999, and being a DJ on Manchester Talk Radio. In 2001, she appeared in the BBC television comedy sketch series Revolver and on several episodes of the ITV1 game show Lily Savage's Blankety Blank. In 2004, she won the first series of the Living TV reality series, I'm Famous and Frightened!.

In 2005, Goodyear was one of the celebrities taking part in the ITV reality series, Celebrity Fit Club, alongside former Coronation Street co-star Ken Morley. She was originally made team captain but quit the role after six weeks, and the role was taken over by Aldo Zilli. She lost 1 stone 10 pounds, and her team won the show.

She appeared in the reality shows Road Raja, Age Swap, Celebrity Penthouse and Celebrity Stars in Their Eyes as Marlene Dietrich. She had a small role in the British film Tug of War (2006) and in October 2006 played a brief role in Channel 4 soap opera Hollyoaks as Mrs. Temple, owner of a B&B. In 2007, she was interviewed by Piers Morgan for the BBC series You Can't Fire Me, I'm Famous where she discussed her highly publicised short-lived return to Coronation Street in 2002. In April 2008, Goodyear and her fourth husband appeared on an episode of All Star Mr & Mrs, and in December 2008, Goodyear portrayed Sarah Harding's mother in the Christmas variety show The Girls Aloud Party. In October 2009, it was confirmed that she would be starring in Calendar Girls on the West End stage, and appeared in the show for three weeks before dropping out due to a virus. In December 2010, she participated in a Coronation Street special of Come Dine with Me.

In 2012, Goodyear became a housemate on the tenth series of Celebrity Big Brother on Channel 5. She was the seventh housemate to be evicted on Day 22 in a double eviction alongside fellow housemate Lorenzo Borghese.

Goodyear appeared on Piers Morgan's Life Stories in 2013. In 2017, Goodyear appeared in the BBC Two documentary Queer as Art. She made an appearance on The Big Quiz in 2018 and was interviewed for the television documentary Coronation Street at Christmas in 2019, the latter of which was her final television appearance.

== Personal life ==
Goodyear has been married four times. Her first marriage was to Ray Sutcliffe at the age of 17 when she was two months pregnant with her son, Gary, who was born in April 1960. Her second husband, Tony Rudman, left her for his best man on their wedding day after Goodyear discovered he was gay; their marriage was subsequently annulled. Her third marriage in 1985 was after a long-distance relationship with American Richard Skrob. She married her fourth husband, Scott Brand, 26 years her junior, in 2007 after eleven years together. She has three grandchildren. Goodyear is a life-long resident of Heywood, Greater Manchester and lived with her fourth husband at Primrose Hill Farm, a property she purchased and renovated in 1995. They sold the property in 2025.

Her autobiography, titled Just Julie, was released in November 2006. In the book, she discussed her upbringing, bisexuality, experience with cancer, and Coronation Street. Goodyear is a patron of Willow Wood Hospice, where her Coronation Street co-star Roy Barraclough died in 2017. She donated several pieces of jewellery and memorabilia worn by her character Bet Lynch in order to raise funds for the hospice.

=== Health problems ===
In 1979, she temporarily left Coronation Street for the second of three times after being diagnosed with cervical cancer, something she kept secret from the public until she had recovered. Following her ordeal with cancer, she founded a charity which resulted in formation of the Julie Goodyear Cancer Screening Centre.

In June 2023, Goodyear's husband Scott Brand announced that she had been diagnosed with dementia, confirming in a statement that she had been "suffering [from] forgetfulness for some time" [...] adding that they had been seeking medical advice and assistance, however there was "no hope of a reversal in the situation" and that her condition will get progressively worse. Following her diagnosis, Goodyear attended a memory walk alongside her husband in Heaton Park, Manchester for the Alzheimer's Society in October 2023. In March 2024, Goodyear's husband said she was "slowly fading away" and that it had been "extremely painful" to watch her deterioration.

== Honours ==
She was appointed Member of the Order of the British Empire in the 1996 New Year Honours, "for services to television drama".

== Filmography ==
=== As actress ===
Year	Title	Role	Notes
1965–1966	Pardon the Expression	Various	4 episodes
1965–1966	The Man in Room 17	Duckie	2 episodes
1966	ITV Play of the Week	The Actress	Series 11: Episode 25
1966, 1970–1995, 2002–2003	Coronation Street	Bet Lynch/Gilroy	Regular role; 1,979 episodes
1967	Mr. Rose	Miss Dean	Episode: "The Bright Bomber"
1967	The Fellows	Waitress	Episode: "Inside Out: Part Two"
1968	City '68	The Woman	Episode: "Love Thy Neighbour"
1968	Spindoe	Girl in Café	Episode: "Now You're Running..."
1968	The War of Darkie Pilbeam	Waitress	Episode: "Phase I: September 1939"
1968	Nearest and Dearest	Sandra	Episode: "It Comes to Us All"
1969	Her Majesty's Pleasure	Nurse	Episode: "This Can't Be Love"
1969	The Contenders	Estelle Laverne	Episode: "Round One"
1969	Kes	Betting Shop Woman	Film; minor role
1969–1970	The Dustbinmen	Various	2 episodes
1970	Nearest and Dearest	Celia	Episode: "When You've Got to Go"
1970	A Family at War	Mrs. Powner	Episode: "The Night They Hit No. 8"
1984	Joy to the World: A Celebration of Christmas	Various	Television special
1988	How to Be Cool	The Celebrity	2 episodes
1990	ITV Telethon	Bet Gilroy	Television special
1999	Coronation Street: After Hours	Bet Gilroy	All 6 episodes
2001, 2004	Revolver	Various	6 episodes
2006	Hollyoaks	Mrs. Temple	1 episode
2006	Tug of War	Sister Mary	Supporting role
2008	The Girls Aloud Party	Sarah’s Mother	Television special

=== As herself ===
Year	Title	Role	Notes
1972–2001	This Is Your Life	Guest / Contributor	13 episodes
1977	The Russell Harty Show	Guest	1 episode
1978	Those Wonderful TV Times	Guest	1 episode
1987	Des O’Connor Tonight	Guest	1 episode
1988	Wogan	Guest	1 episode
1988	ITV Telethon	Participant	Television special
1989	The Royal Variety Performance	Participant	Television special
1994	The Julie Goodyear Talk Show	Host	Television special
1995	Noel’s House Party	Guest	
1995, 2006	This Morning	Guest	2 episodes
1998	Holiday Heaven	Guest	1 episode
1998	The National Lottery	Guest	1 episode
1999	Livetime	Host	7 episodes
1999	Funny Women	Contributor	Television documentary
2000	So Graham Norton	Guest	1 episode
2000	40 Years on Coronation Street	Contributor	Television special
2001	Blankety Blank	Participant	4 episodes
2001	Life After the Street	Contributor	Television documentary
2002	Exclusive	Participant	Television documentary
2002	Live Lunch	Guest	1 episode
2002	Top Ten	Presenter	2 episodes
2002	The Truth About Julie Goodyear	Main contributor	Television documentary
2003	Stars in Their Eyes	Contestant as Marlene Dietrich	1 episode
2003	The Salon	Guest	1 episode
2003–2004	Coronation Street: Secrets	Contributor	4 episodes
2004	I'm Famous and Frightened!	Participant	3 episodes
2004	The TV Chef	Participant	Television special
2004	How Soaps Changed the World	Contributor	Television documentary
2004	The Best of ‘So Graham Norton’	Guest	Television special
2005	Celebrity Fit Club	Participant	3 episodes
2005	Coronation Street: The Duckworth Family Album	Contributor	Television special
2005–2008	The New Paul O'Grady Show	Guest	4 episodes
2006	You Can't Fire Me, I'm Famous	Guest	1 episode
2008	All Star Mr & Mrs	Guest	1 episode
2008–2011	Loose Women	Guest	4 episodes
2009	The One Show	Guest	1 episode
2010	Come Dine with Me	Participant	1 episode
2011	The Betty Driver Story	Contributor	Television special
2012	Celebrity Big Brother	Housemate	27 episodes
2012	The Corrie Years	Contributor	2 episodes
2012–2013	Big Brother's Bit on the Side	Guest	24 episodes
2013	Piers Morgan's Life Stories	Guest	1 episode
2014	Daybreak	Guest	1 episode
2017	Queer as Art	Television documentary	1 episode
2018	The Big Quiz	Guest	Game show
2019	Coronation Street at Christmas	Contributor	Television special

=== Stage ===
Year	Title	Role	Notes	Ref(s)
1997–1998	Aladdin	Widow Twankey	Royal Court Theatre, Liverpool	
2000–2001	Snow White and the Seven Dwarfs	Wicked Queen	Grand Opera House, Manchester	
2009	Calendar Girls	Cora	Noël Coward Theatre	
2012	Street of Dreams	Bet Lynch	UK tour	
