= JoAnne Good =

British radio presenter (born 1955)

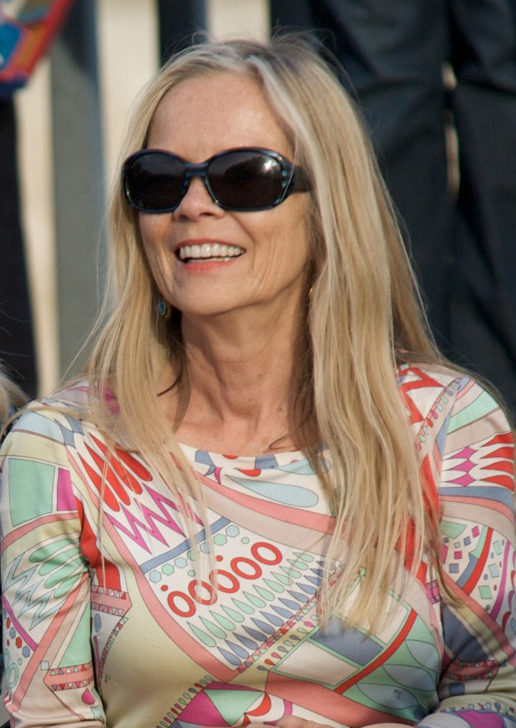
- Good in 2011
- Born: JoAnne Dorothy Good; 15 January 1955 (age 71); Lewisham, London, England
- Occupations: Radio presenter; television presenter; broadcast journalist; actress
- Presenting career
- Show: The Late Show
- Station: BBC Radio London
- Network: BBC Radio
- Time slot: Fri – Sat; 10pm–1am GMT/BST
- Country: United Kingdom

JoAnne Dorothy Good (born 15 January 1955) is a British radio presenter, television presenter, broadcast journalist and actress.

== Career ==
=== Actress ===
As an actress, Good is best known for her role as Carole Sands in the ITV soap Crossroads from 1981 to 1984. She played a schoolgirl in the 1978 British horror film Killer's Moon, and filmed an interview for the 2008 DVD release. She also appeared in the all-star black comedy film Eat the Rich in 1987 and in the Only Fools and Horses episode "Go West Young Man" in 1981. She provided the voices of Lillie Lightship, Sally Seaplane and Pearl in Tugs, a show created by Robert D. Cardona, David Mitton and the original model makers of Thomas the Tank Engine & Friends. On stage she has played the title role in Educating Rita, co-starring with Norman Bowler, and for several years in the 1990s worked as part of Derek Nimmo's touring company, performing all over the world. She played several parts in The Bill and was an extra in the Sex and the City film.

=== Radio and TV presenter ===
Good started as a radio presenter on BBC Southern Counties Radio in Brighton and occasionally did reports for the television programme BBC South Today. Good joined BBC London 94.9 in October 2003 and has remained there since. She originally presented the overnight slot, followed by the Breakfast Show which she presented from 2005 until 2010 when she was asked to present her own late show titled The Late Show with Joanne Good. She presented the show for just under three years.

In 2007 Good auditioned unsuccessfully for a role on Loose Women and in 2010 she was considered as a replacement for Christine Bleakley on The One Show, the BBC's live evening televised magazine show on BBC One.

In addition to her radio work, Good has also been featured in the Sky One show A Different Breed along with her friend Anna Webb. The show showed Good and Webb at dog events and featured extracts from her Late Night show and its Barking at the Moon segment which was broadcast every Thursday night from 10:00 pm to midnight.

In November 2012 Good began presenting the afternoon slot, 3:00 pm till 5:00 pm (later extended to 1:30 pm to 5:00 pm), on BBC London 94.9 and presents the late show every New Year's Eve on the same station, and she returned to the late show slot on 13 September 2021.

Good presented regular reports for the BBC London current affairs television programme Inside Out, shown on BBC1 weekly whilst occasionally making reports for the South East edition show from 1:30 pm to 5:00 pm from January 2016. She also works a regular columnist and magazine and newspaper writer.

Good sat in for Alex Lester on BBC Radio 2 during August 2014 and has appeared on The Alan Titchmarsh Show as a pet expert.

In November 2018, with her English bulldog by her side, she began presenting a podcast for the BBC, Dogs and the City, interviewing celebrities and their dogs. Fifty-two episodes were recorded, finishing in July 2020.

She has also co-written a book with her friend Anna Webb called Barking Blondes, released in 2013. The book is a memoir of her broadcasting years and her love of her dog.

On 10 September 2024, she became part of ITV's This Morning fashion presenting team.

== Personal life ==
Good's family emigrated to Australia when she was four, and returned when she was twelve.

She married actor Richard Piper in 1978, and they were together for four years. After her divorce from Piper, Good was subsequently in a relationship with her Crossroads co-star David Moran. Her partner and fellow BBC London 94.9 presenter Big George died in May 2011.

Good was a passenger on one of the trains involved in the Bedfordshire train crash on 19 June 2026. She received four broken bones.

Her friends include Julie Burchill and Julian Clary.

== Filmography ==
=== Film ===
Year	Title	Role	Notes
1977	Killer's Moon	Mary	Credited as Jo-Anne Good
1987	Eat the Rich	Jaqueline	

=== Television ===
Year	Title	Role	Notes
1979	Potter	Office girl	Credited as Jo-Anne Good
1979	Dave Allen at Large		Credited as Jo-Anne Good
1981	Seconds Out	Nancy	Episode: "Round 1"
1981	Only Fools and Horses	Michelle	Episode: "Go West Young Man"
1981–1984	Crossroads	Carole Sands	Recurring role
1983	All for Love	Sarah	Episode: "Fireworks for Elspeth"
1984	Up the Elephant and Round the Castle	Shop assistant	Episode: "A Bird in the Hand Is Worth Two in Shepherd's Bush"
1985	Dempsey and Makepeace	Girlfriend	Episode: "The Squeeze"
1987	Ffizz	Miss Clarke	Episode: "Play It by the Book"
1987	Last of the Summer Wine	Vi	Episode: "Big Day at Dream Acres"
1994	A Dark Adapted Eye	Shoppers	Episode: #1.2
1995	An Independent Man	Secretary	Episode: "Horse Power Politics"
1995	Shine on Harvey Moon	Mrs. Cooper	Episode: #5.8
1996	Sometime, Never	Jane	Episode: "Respect"
1997	The Detectives	Sister Watts	Episode: "Cardiac Arrest"
1999	Forgotten	Rose the landlady	2 episodes
1999	Maisie Raine	Katrina	Episode: "Can't See for Looking"
1997–2000	Casualty	Mrs. Ross; Paula Johnson	2 episodes
2000	Daylight Robbery	Prison Escort	Episode: #2.2
2000	Silent Witness	TV reporter	Episode: "The World Cruise: Part 1"
2004	Heartbeat	Jennifer	Episode: "Wrecked"
2004	Auf Wiedersehen, Pet	Elena	2 episodes
2005	Doctors	Liz Slade	Episode: "0 – 60"
1989–2008	The Bill	Mrs. Lowry; Mrs. Hazel; Mrs. Abbott; Cherry Towner; Judy Hearn; Cynthia Graham; Beverley Reynolds; Elaine Marshal	11 episodes
2009	Waving at Trains	Susan	Voice

=== Animation ===
Year	Title	Role	Notes
1989	Tugs	Lillie Lightship; Pearl; Sally Seaplane	
