= 1978 in British radio =

This is a list of events in British radio during 1978.

== Events ==
=== January to February ===
- No events.

=== March ===
- 8 March – The first episode of The Hitchhiker's Guide to the Galaxy – the radio series later to be turned into a book, a television programme, a game, and a film – is broadcast on BBC Radio 4.
- 26 March – Tom Browne presents BBC Radio 1's Top 20 show for the final time.

=== April ===
- 1 April – BBC Radio 2's broadcasting hours are extended when budget restrictions are eased, and the pre 1975 broadcasting hours of 5 am – 2 am are re-introduced.
- 2 April – Simon Bates replaces Tom Browne on BBC Radio 1's Top 20 show.
- 3 April – Permanent radio broadcasts of proceedings in the House of Commons begin; George Thomas is the Speaker.
- 11 April – Denis Healey, the Chancellor of the Exchequer, presents the first budget to the House of Commons to be heard on the radio.
- 29 April – Noel Edmonds presents his final Radio 1 Breakfast Show.

=== May ===
- 2 May – Dave Lee Travis succeeds Noel Edmonds as presenter of The Radio 1 Breakfast Show.

=== June ===
- No events.

=== July ===
- 3 July
  - After just over a year of being broadcast in two parts, Today once again becomes a continuous two-hour programme. It now airs on BBC Radio 4 from 6.30am until just after 8.30am.
  - The radio play Pearl by John Arden is first performed.

=== August ===
- 22 August – The opening episode of the sixth series of BBC Radio 4's comedy panel show I'm Sorry I Haven't a Clue introduces the pseudo-game "Mornington Crescent".

=== September to October ===
- No events.

=== Undated in Autumn ===
- Ahead of the launch of BBC Radio Wales, four experimental local radio stations broadcasting for a single week take place. They are Radio Wrexham, Radio Deeside, Radio Merthyr and Radio Rhondda.

=== November ===
- 12 November – Radio 1's Sunday teatime chart show is extended from a Top 20 countdown to a Top 40 countdown. Simon Bates is the presenter having taken over as host from Tom Browne earlier in the year.
- 17 November – The Friday Rock Show, presented by Tommy Vance, makes its debut on BBC Radio 1. Tommy remains the programme's presenter until he moves to Virgin 1215 in April 1993.
- 23 November
  - All BBC national radio stations change their medium or long wave transmission wavelength as part of a plan for BBC AM broadcasting in order to improve national AM reception, and to conform with the Geneva Frequency Plan of 1975. Radio 1's transmission wavelength is moved from 247m (1214 kHz) to 275 & 285m (1053 & 1089 kHz) medium wave. Radio 2's wavelength is moved from 1500m (200 kHz) long wave to 433 & 330m (693 & 909 kHz) medium wave. Radio 3 is moved from 464m (647 kHz) to 247m (1215 kHz) medium wave. Radio 4 is moved from various medium wavelengths to 1500m (200 kHz) long wave.
  - The shipping forecast transfers from BBC Radio 2 to BBC Radio 4 so that the forecast can continue to be broadcast on long wave.
  - The Radio 4 UK Theme is used for the first time to coincide with the network becoming a fully national service for the first time and to underline this the station officially becomes known as Radio 4 UK.
  - BBC Radio Scotland and BBC Radio Wales launch as full time stations on the former Radio 4 Scottish and Welsh medium wave opt-out wavelengths of 370m (810 kHz) and 340m (882 kHz) respectively, albeit initially with very limited broadcast hours due to very limited coverage of Radio 4 on FM in both countries. The establishment of separate networks has been made possible by the transfer of Radio 4 to a fully UK-wide network on moving from medium wave to long wave.

=== December ===
- 22 December – Industrial action at the BBC by the ABS union, which started the previous day, is extended to radio when the radio unions join their television counterparts and go on strike too, forcing the BBC to merge its four national radio networks from 4.00pm into one national radio station called the BBC All Network Radio Service. The strike is settled shortly before 10.00pm tonight with unions and BBC management reaching a pay agreement at the British government's industrial disputes arbitration service ACAS.

=== Undated in other seasons ===
- BBC World Service begins to use the Orfordness transmitting station on the east coast of England for night-time broadcasts on 1296 kHz in Eastern European languages.

== Station debuts ==
- 13 November – BBC Radio Wales
- 23 November – BBC Radio Scotland

== Programme debuts ==
- 26 December – The 27-Year Itch on BBC Radio 4 (1978–80)

== Continuing radio programmes ==
=== 1940s ===
- Sunday Half Hour (1940–2018)
- Desert Island Discs (1942–Present)
- Down Your Way (1946–1992)
- Letter from America (1946–2004)
- Woman's Hour (1946–Present)
- A Book at Bedtime (1949–Present)

=== 1950s ===
- The Archers (1950–Present)
- The Today Programme (1957–Present)
- Sing Something Simple (1959–2001)
- Your Hundred Best Tunes (1959–2007)

=== 1960s ===
- Farming Today (1960–Present)
- In Touch (1961–Present)
- Petticoat Line (1965–1979)
- The World at One (1965–Present)
- The Official Chart (1967–Present)
- Just a Minute (1967–Present)
- The Living World (1968–Present)
- The Organist Entertains (1969–2018)

=== 1970s ===
- PM (1970–Present)
- Start the Week (1970–Present)
- Week Ending (1970–1998)
- You and Yours (1970–Present)
- I'm Sorry I Haven't a Clue (1972–Present)
- Good Morning Scotland (1973–2025)
- Hello Cheeky (1973–1979)
- Kaleidoscope (1973–1998)
- Newsbeat (1973–Present)
- The News Huddlines (1975–2001)
- The Burkiss Way (1976–1980)
- File on 4 (1977–Present)
- Money Box (1977–Present)
- The News Quiz (1977–Present)

== Ending this year ==
- 30 June – Up to the Hour (1977–1978)

== Births ==
- 21 January – Rachael Bland, journalist, newsreader and presenter (BBC Radio 5 Live) (d. 2018)
- 6 April – Myleene Klass, singer and broadcast presenter
- 28 April – Lauren Laverne, radio and television presenter
- 18 July – Annie Mac(Manus), Irish-born DJ
- 20 July – Neil 'Roberto' Williams, radio and television presenter, event host, voice-over artist and DJ
- 22 July – Martyn Lee, radio host and producer
- 11 August – Isy Suttie, comedian
- 19 August – Rich Clarke, radio presenter, podcast creator, host and DJ
- 6 December – Rigsy, Northern Ireland broadcast presenter and DJ

== Deaths ==
- 15 January – Jack Jackson, 71, trumpeter, bandleader and disc jockey
- 19 January – Donald McCullough, 76, broadcaster (The Brains Trust)
- 26 January – Leo Genn, 72, actor
- 24 February – Mrs Mills, 59, pianist (heart attack)
- 12 March – Tolchard Evans, 76, songwriter, composer, pianist and bandleader
- 25 March – Jack Hulbert, 85, actor (Discord in Three Flats)
- 25 March – Thomas Woodrooffe, 79, naval officer and radio commentator
- 27 March – Wilfred Pickles, 73, radio presenter
- 2 April – Ray Noble, 74, bandleader, composer, arranger, radio comedian, and actor
- 31 July – Carleton Hobbs, 80, actor
- 14 August – Victor Silvester, 78, bandleader
- 18 August – Doris Waters, 78, comedy performer
- 15 December – Edgar Lustgarten, 71, broadcaster specialising in true crime

== See also ==
- 1978 in British music
- 1978 in British television
- 1978 in the United Kingdom
- List of British films of 1978
