= Chubby Oates =

British comedian (1942–2006)

- Born: Arthur John Oates; 23 December 1942; Bermondsey, London, England
- Died: 10 November 2006 (aged 63); Deal, Kent, England
- Occupation: Actor

Arthur ("Chubby") Oates (23 December 1942 – 10 November 2006) was a Cockney clubland comic and character actor.

== Life ==
Born in Bermondsey, South London Oates started out as a reporter for the South London Observer, he shared an office with future editor of The Sun, Kelvin MacKenzie.
In the evenings Oates began to perform as a comic and by the early sixties he'd turned professional. He was also a noted pantomime performer usually appearing as the dame. In this capacity he played "Mum" to some of the biggest and best names in showbusiness. He also claimed the record for the heaviest Ugly Sisters when his co-star in a production of "Cinderella" at Yeovil's Octagon Theatre was Steve King. Their combined weight was in excess of 30 stone!
In 1973-74 he co-starred with Fiona Richmond in Pyjama Tops, a long-running Paul Raymond comedy at the Whitehall Theatre. As a character actor Oates appeared in shows such as Doctor Who and Dixon of Dock Green, and also played the coach driver in the cult horror film Killer's Moon (1978). He played a common soldier, providing a monologue in the BBC drama The Devil's Crown also in 1978.

He died in Deal in Kent on 10 November 2006 aged 63 from diabetic complications and a heart attack after giving a performance at a showbusiness luncheon. Appropriately, one of the last pictures taken of Chubby showed veteran comedy legends Roy Hudd and June Whitfield laughing at a joke Chubby had just cracked.

== Filmography ==
Year	Title	Role	Notes
1973-1975	Dixon of Dock Green	Terry/Man with Dog	2 episodes
1974	Doctor Who	Policeman	Episode: Planet of the Spiders
1976	Rogue's Rock	Cyril	4 episodes
1978	The Devil's Crown	Common Soldier	Miniseries
1978	The Famous Five	Alfredo	Episode: Five Have a Wonderful Time
1978	Killer's Moon	Bus Driver	
1980	Cribb	Chairman	Episode: Abracadaver
