= Nighthawks (1978 film) =

1978 UK film by Ron Peck

- DVD cover
- Directed by: Ron Peck
- Written by: Ron Peck; Paul Hallam
- Screenplay by: Ron Peck
- Produced by: Ron Peck; Paul Hallam
- Starring: Ken Robertson; Tony Westrope; Rachel Nicholas James
- Cinematography: Joanna Davis; Patrick Duval; Sebastian Dewsbery; Ian Owles
- Edited by: Mary Pat Leece; Richard Taylor; Debra Daley
- Music by: David Graham Ellis
- Production companies: Nashburgh; Four Corners Films
- Release date: 26 August 1978; (Edinburgh Film Festival)
- Running time: 113 minutes
- Country: United Kingdom
- Language: English
- Budget: £66,000

Nighthawks is a 1978 narrative film written by Ron Peck and Paul Hallam and directed by Peck, in his feature film directorial debut. The film stars Ken Robertson, Tony Westrope and Rachel Nicholas James.

It follows the day-to-day life of a gay man in London. It is the first explicitly gay British feature set in the gay community.

== Plot ==
The film realistically portrays day-to-day gay life in London at the time. It shows a gay man, played by Ken Robertson, teaching geography during the day and going to gay pubs at night. His students ultimately challenge him with questions as to whether he is bent/queer. He responds that he is and answers their questions about his homosexuality calmly.

British film critic Alexander Walker notes that the final scene in the school where Jim is answering questions from his students, uses real London schoolkids:

... who either spoke the crude taunts written for them, or improvised insults of their own as they quiz teacher about his gay life; it's supposed to be Jim's coming out; but the impression left with me was — what a horrifying generation of pubescent bigots our schools are rearing; little faces of childhood already set in the ugly plaster of adult prejudice; so much for education on the facts of sex, never mind the ethics of tolerance. (Note: Peck said they planted some of the kids questions, which came from John Warburton's book Open and Positive, and the other questions were made up by the kids themselves in consultation with the production team.)

== Cast ==
- Ken Robertson as Jim
- Tony Westrope as Mike
- Rachel Nicholas James as Judy
- Maureen Dolan as Pat
- Stuart Turton as Neal
- Clive Peters as Peter
- Robert Merrick as John
- Frank Dilbert as American
- Peter Radmall as Artist
- Ernest Brightmore as Headmaster
- Jon Lindsay as the Hustler
- Norman Bateson
- Phillip Beckett
- Derek Chandler
- John Cooper
- Haydn Corlett
- Alan C. Ellaway
- Alex Hamilton
- Frank Honore
- Roland Jeffrey
- Leo Madigan
- Nicky Price
- Neil Simpson
- Alan Stafford
- Peter Thomas
- Kris Watson
- Colin Batteson
- Peter Bradley
- Billy Browne
- Ian Buckley
- Geoff Clarkson
- Emmanuel Cooper
- Martin Corbett
- Gary Duckworth
- Kevin Embrey
- Laurence Furness
- Tony Godden
- Ian Hayward
- Piers Headley
- Derek Jarman
- Nigel Kent
- Bob Knight
- Susan Lloyd
- Pat Loveless
- Raymond Pooley
- Clive Ramsey
- Steve Rotherforth
- Bill Thornycroft
- Ian Townson
- John Warburton

== Background and production ==
External image
- via The Guardian
- Ron Peck, director of the film (Photograph by Mark Ayres)

When Ron Peck was attending London Film School, he formed Four Corners Films with Mary Pat Leece, Joanna Davis, and Wilfried Thust. The Four Corners collective went on to become the production company behind the film, with all four members playing key roles in the creation of the movie.

Peck's filmmaking was heavily influenced by American film director Nicholas Ray. While studying as an undergraduate in Swansea, he attended a Ray season at the National Film Theatre, where he had the opportunity to meet and have an intimate conversation with the auteur director. After graduating from London Film School, he began to work on the Nighthawks project, and it was Ray's work that served as an inspiration for the film. The original working title for Nighthawks was Blind Run, the rejected title for Rebel Without a Cause. In addition, Peck named the Jim and Judy characters in Nighthawks after James Dean's and Natalie Wood's characters in Rebel Without a Cause.

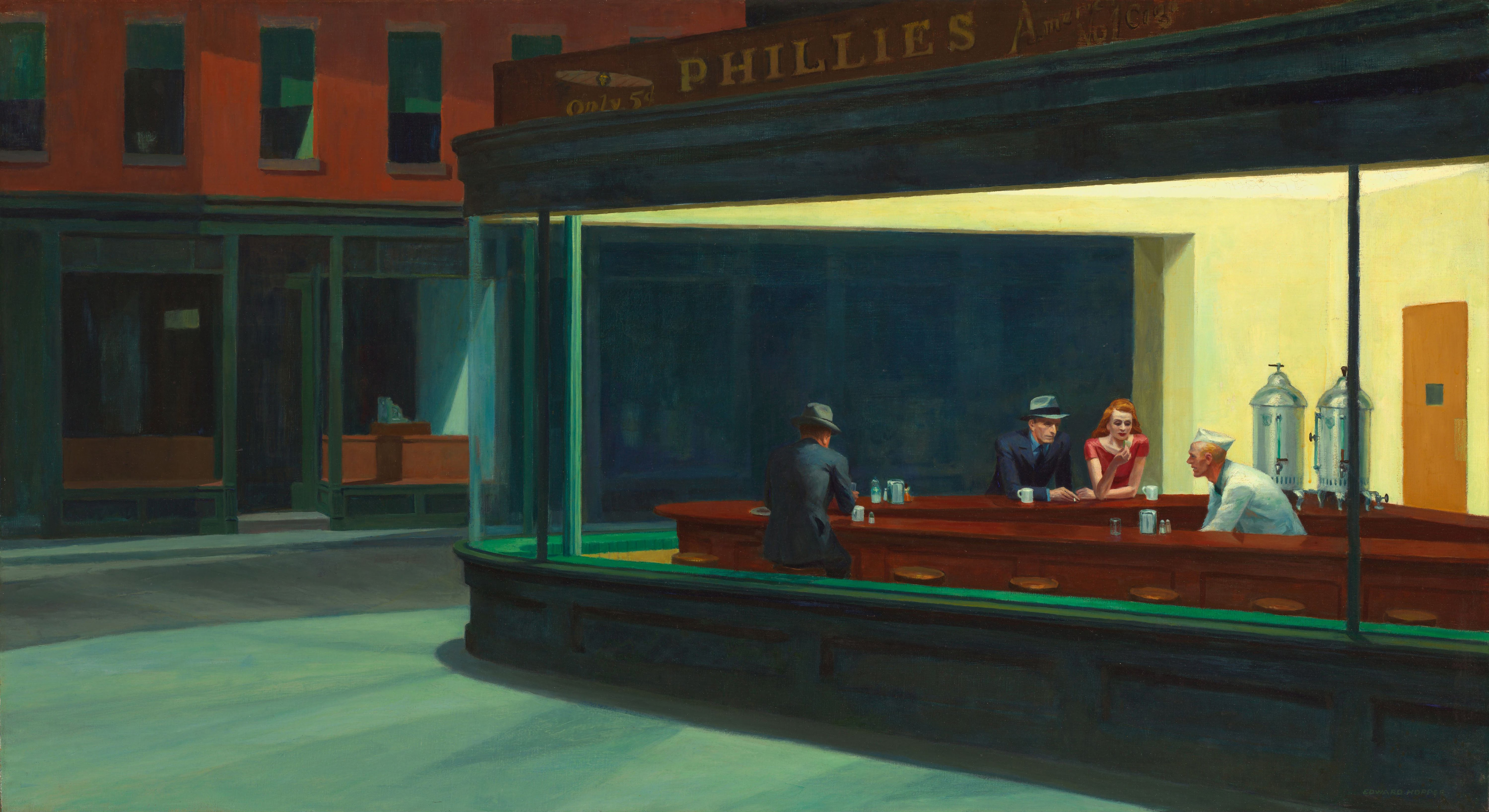
Edward Hopper's 1942 painting Nighthawks

The title Peck eventually settled on was Nighthawks, a reference to Edward Hopper's 1942 painting of the same name. Peck said the feeling you get from Hopper's painting is very similar to the world depicted by Ray, a realm of "essentially lonely people, trying to come together, maybe succeeding for a while." He went on to say that for him, the painting recalls Ray's 1950 film, In a Lonely Place, "the acceptance there of relationships that may not last." The first working draft of the script for Nighthawks opened with characters exiting a screening of In a Lonely Place at the Notting Hill Gaumont cinema.

Peck started his search for funding for the film in November 1975, when he sent a proposal to the British Film Institute (BFI) production board. The BFI denied funding for Peck's project, as they were limited to financing one low–budget film a year, which ended up being the 1977 film Riddles of the Sphinx. Peck eventually turned to getting private donors and the German public-service television broadcaster ZDF to help finance the film. Some of the notable private donors he solicited for funding included: Albert Finney, Stanley Kubrick, Doris Lessing, Dick Lester, Elton John, John Reid, David Hockney, Michael Oliver, and Joseph Lockwood. Peck also had a private meeting with Freddie Mercury, asking for funding, but he declined.

In January 1976, Peck placed an advertisement in Gay News, in a bid to attract assistance in making the film. As a result of the advert, Paul Hallam, Frank Dilbert, Clive Peters and Stuart Turton were all brought on board to help with the project, with the latter three appearing in the movie as dates of Jim. Peck also met with John Warburton, a former geography teacher at a secondary school in London, who was fired and subsequently banned from teaching in any Inner London Education Authority school, after some of his students spotted him at a gay rights demonstration, and later asked him in the classroom about his attendance at the demonstration and his sexuality. Peck briefly considered him for the lead role of Jim, but instead Peck gave him a cameo in the movie in a scene at a pub. The scene in the film where Jim outs himself to his class, and answers their questions, was directly inspired by Warburton's experiences.

Filming finally commenced in January and February 1978. Ken Robertson, who had only been considered for the lead in October 1977, was hired to play Jim; he was the only paid actor on the production. Reshoots and additional scenes were recorded in April 1978, and the film was edited the following month at Don Boyd's facilities on Berwick Street. Peck recalled that "the material threw up immediate problems."

It hadn't been shot with conventional coverage but mostly as a series of very long sequence takes; there were no cutaways to help abbreviate scenes; as every scene was improvised and every take of even the same scenes was different, there were no obvious cutting points; and when first put together, as a full narrative, the film ran to something like 4 hours. It was not an easy cutting job.

Peck said they had to cut multiple scenes that did not work, weak performances and characters were chopped, and a sequence of cruising on Hampstead Heath was removed. Peck decided the two main narrative threads should be focused on Jim and Judy, and Jim's series of sexual encounters. The first rough cut of the film ran around two-and-a-half hours in length, which was then whittled down to the final 113-minute cut.

== Release ==
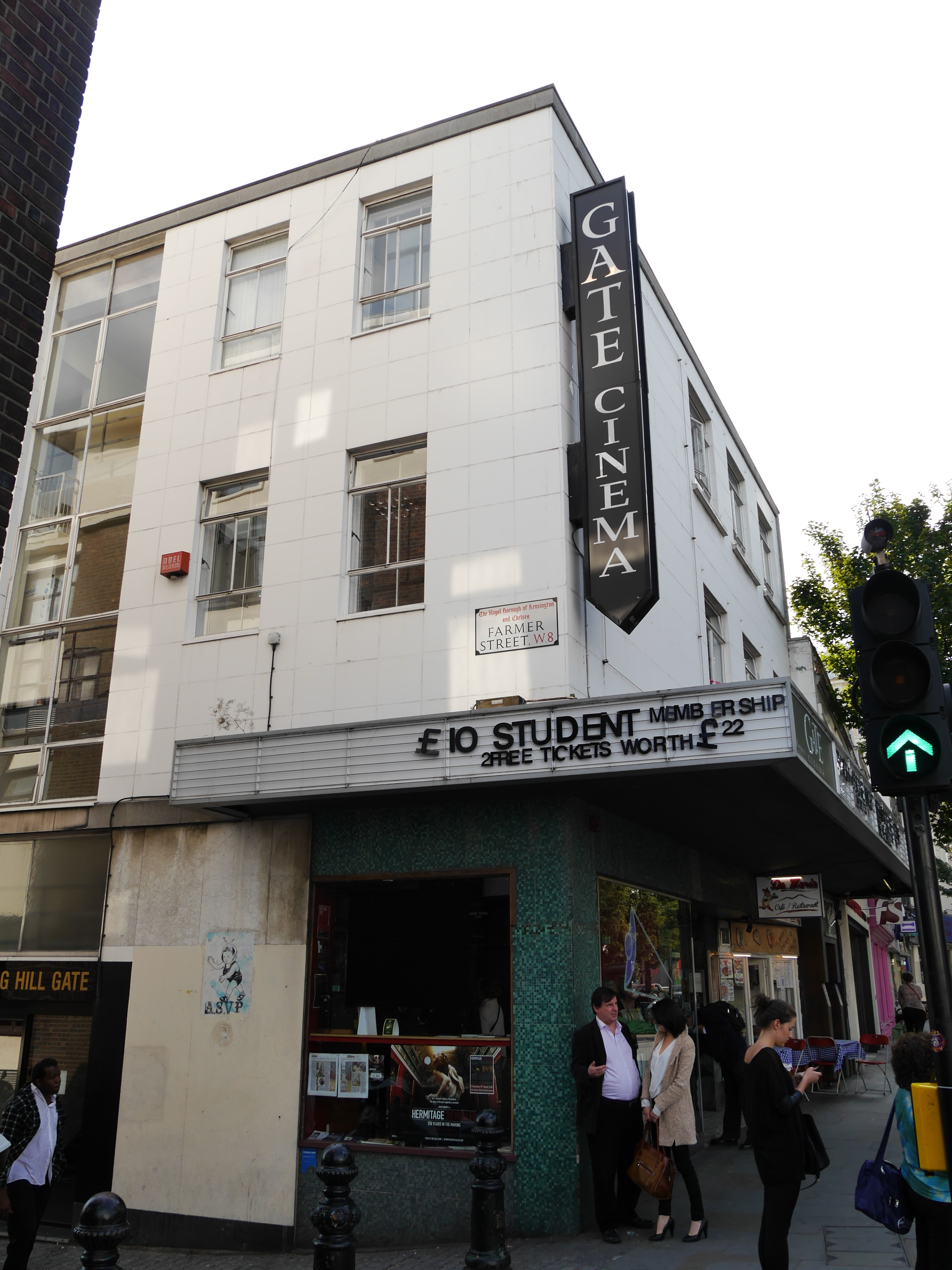
Gate Cinema seen in September 2014

The film premiered at the Edinburgh International Film Festival on August 26, 1978, and then it was aired on the German public-service television broadcaster ZDF on September 7, 1978, to an audience of 2.65 million viewers.

In November 1978, it was screened at the Chicago International Film Festival and the London Film Festival. The film was commercially released into British cinemas in March 1979; with a run of ten weeks at the Gate Cinema in Notting Hill. A demonstration was staged at the Gate Cinema during the film's run there by Icebreakers, an organization that operated a telephone support line for isolated gay men. (Note: Icebreakers roots can be traced back to the United Kingdom Gay Liberation Front's counter-psychiatry group, whose objective was to provide emotional support to those who suffered from queer discrimination, and also counter the long history of queer oppression that psychiatrists had supported and enacted; because at that time, homosexuality had not yet been removed as a psychiatric condition from the Diagnostic and Statistical Manual of Mental Disorders.)

In May 1979, it was featured in the Director's Fortnight at the Cannes Film Festival, which led to international distribution and further film festival screenings. Despite the visibility and critical praise, the film did not recover its production costs.

The film was released on DVD by Second Run in 2005, and featured a short documentary by Matt Lucas, examining the film's production, reception and legacy.

== Reception ==
Rob Baker, in the Soho Weekly News, wrote that "it neither glamorizes nor sensationalizes the world it portrays; it is a film totally devoid of trumped-up triumphs or tragedies." American film critic David Denby, called the film "a work of great candor and moral courage: it may be the first movie about gay life made without fear, defensiveness, or show-off bravado." Screen International's Marjorie Bilbow described the film as "refreshingly objective: a warts and all study that wins more understanding and sympathy than any amount of special pleading would have done."

Helen de Witt in Screenonline wrote that the final scene with the schoolkids quizzing him is a "key scene for the audience as Jim opens up to the class, which becomes his audience; the expectation is that, having had the courage to confront the prejudices of the class and his headmaster, Jim will become content and more decisive about his life." Jack King from the British Film Institute said that "through narrative fiction, Peck employs an aesthetic style evocative of documentary realism, evoking the realities of the closet for English gay men in the late 1970s.

American film critic Janet Maslin said the film "is gentle, believable, realistic, and Robertson gives a performance that's as touching and consistent as the circumstances allow." Michael Bronksi from Gay Community News wrote the film "is a solid, impressive piece of moviemaking; while most other films can be faulted for not catching the nuances of gay life, this is exactly where Nighthawks is strongest." Ellen Cooney from Sojourner commented that "in its low-key manner and its concentration on everyday reality the film emerges as one of the finest renderings of gay life in any medium."

British film critic Nigel Andrews, said it "has a dogged, mournful naturalism so winning that its conversation scenes are like Harold Pinter dialogue short of its artful stylisation; a homosexual's life is seen far from being uncommonly weird or squalid or exotic, but rather made of much the same hit–or–miss emotions and daily hopes and fears as anyone else's." Canadian film critic Thomas Waugh wrote "the great virtue of the film is the way it engages as much with Jim's professional life as with his sexual and social life; this is important because the workplace is one of the fiercest sites of oppression for homosexuals; the special moments happen in his professional milieu."

== Legacy ==
English actor Matt Lucas said people should "view Nighthawks not as a gay film but as a social document of life in late–70s London." He went on to say that growing up in the 1980s and 90s, there wasn't that much gay representation on television or film, and by the time he re–watched the movie, "the world had changed"; it was post Graham Norton, post Queer As Folk, and a new government was in power. He concluded that it is better all around than it was in the past for gay people, "and we owe that to men like Ron Peck and Paul Hallam, and to films such as Nighthawks."

Ben Coopman of Another Man noted how it was the "first major British gay film ... that was a community–driven response to the lack of gay representation in the media." He further opined that "it's an unflinching time capsule of a London that feels closed off and claustrophobic ... Jim is on a seemingly endless hunt for connection, putting himself up for rejection by men who hold pints instead of phones; but it's also an important reminder of the small acts of courage that have paved the way for our world today."

In his obituary for Ron Peck, who died in 2022, Ryan Gilbey wrote as LGBTQ+ issues became part of mainstream life, the film has achieved a reputation of exceeding expectations, and for a film that was once "criticised for its dourness", it begins to feel that much warmer, considering that we live in an era of a detached society that is overly dependent on dating apps for social interactions.

== See also ==
- Cinema of the United Kingdom
- London in film
- List of British films of 1978
- List of LGBTQ-related films of 1978
