= 1978 in British television =

This is a list of British television related events from 1978.

== Events ==
=== January ===
- 2 January – The first episode of the science fiction series Blake's 7 is broadcast on BBC1.
- 4 January – The first edition of the arts series The South Bank Show is broadcast, presented by Melvyn Bragg and replaces Aquarius.
- 8 January – All Creatures Great and Small debuts on BBC1.
- 15 January – Ski Sunday makes its debut on BBC2.
- 20 January – The first of ITV's occasional An Audience With programmes is aired. The first presenter is Jasper Carrott.
- 21 January
  - The sci-fi TV series Logan's Run is shown on ITV.
  - The ITV variety and sketch series The Les Dawson Show is first broadcast.
- 27 January – In an interview for Granada Television's World in Action, Leader of the Opposition Margaret Thatcher remarks, "people are really rather afraid that this country might be rather swamped by people with a different culture". Critics regard the comment as a veiled reference to people of colour, thus pandering to xenophobia and reactionary sentiment. However, she receives 10,000 letters thanking her for raising the subject and the Conservatives gain a lead against Labour in the opinion polls.

=== February ===
- 6 February – The BBC broadcasts the inaugural World Darts Championship run by the British Darts Organisation with evening highlights until 10 February (In which Leighton Rees beat John Lowe in the final).
- 8 February –The first episode of the comprehensive school series Grange Hill is broadcast on BBC1. The Phil Redmond-devised teenage drama will become one of the longest-running programmes on British television, lasting until 2008.
- 12 February – The Doctor's Dilemma gets its first broadcast on BBC Two.
- 13 February – Anna Ford becomes the first female newscaster on News at Ten.
- 21 February – The drama series Armchair Thriller makes its debut on ITV. The series consists of stand-alone serials, the most popular of which, Quiet as a Nun, features a "Nun with No Face" scene.
- 22 February – Pop band The Police appear in an advert for Wrigley's chewing gum.
- 24 February – The BBC airs Going Straight. The sitcom is a direct spin-off from Porridge, starring Ronnie Barker as Norman Stanley Fletcher, newly released from prison. The programme runs for one series.

=== March ===
- 5 March – Elvis Presley's Aloha from Hawaii via Satellite finally makes its British television premiere on BBC1.
- 7 March – Dennis Potter's groundbreaking drama serial Pennies From Heaven is broadcast on BBC1, starring Bob Hoskins.
- 11 March – BBC2 launches the live music show Something Else, which will go on to feature bands such as Joy Division, U2, The Jam, Depeche Mode and The Clash.

=== April ===
- 3 April – ITV begins showing the courtroom drama series Rumpole of the Bailey, having originally debuted as a one-off drama on the BBC's Play for Today in 1975.
- 6 April – The four-part drama series Law & Order begins on BBC2. Each of the four stories within the series is told from a different perspective, including that of the Detective, the Villain, the Brief and the Prisoner. The series proves to be highly controversial upon its release due to its depiction of a corrupt British law enforcement and legal system.
- 10 April – BBC1 debuts the children's music quiz show Cheggers Plays Pop, hosted by Keith Chegwin.
- 17 April – The BBC begins broadcasting the World Snooker Championship with daily highlights until the final on 29 April. Previously, they only had highlights of the final on Grandstand with largely further coverage last year.

=== May ===
- 24 May – The skateboarding duck item first airs on BBC1's Nationwide.
- 26 May – The Incredible Hulk, starring Bill Bixby as David Bruce Banner and Lou Ferrigno as The Hulk makes its British television debut on ITV.
- 28–29 May – The network television premiere of Francis Ford Coppola's 1972 crime film The Godfather, starring Marlon Brando and Al Pacino and airing as a two-part presentation over two consecutive nights on BBC1.

=== June ===
- 3 June – The long-running US children's series Sesame Street begins airing on both ATV and Border.
- 16 June – ITV broadcasts the documentary The Making of Star Wars.
- 26 June
  - John Noakes, the longest running Blue Peter presenter hosts his final edition after 12 years and 6 months.
  - The final edition of the gameshow Whodunnit airs on ITV.

=== July ===
- 1 July – BBC1 begins showing the US superhero television series Wonder Woman, starring Lynda Carter.
- 3 July – The debut of The Kenny Everett Video Show featuring the comedian and DJ Kenny Everett in a series of sketches on ITV.
- 13 July – The original series of Top Gear begins airing on BBC2 having started as a locally produced programme at BBC Pebble Mill the previous year.
- 29 July – ITV airs the first episode of the Yorkshire Television-produced game show 3-2-1, presented by Ted Rogers, featuring the character "Dusty Bin". The first episode is also notable for the appearance of DJ Janice Long as a contestant.

=== August ===
- 30 August – The first edition of Midweek Sports Special is broadcast on ITV.

=== September ===
- 4 September – The network television premiere of the 1969 James Bond film On Her Majesty's Secret Service on ITV, starring George Lazenby.
- 5 September
  - The US soap opera Dallas is broadcast for the first time in the UK on BBC1.
  - Thames Television launches a lunchtime Thames News bulletin presented by Robin Houston. A late evening bulletin to follow News at Ten is also planned for the same day, but union problems lead to its launch being postponed until 1980.
- 10 September – Return of the Saint airs with new actor Ian Ogilvy and introducing the Jaguar XJ-S to take over from the Volvo P1800 in the Saint 1962 TV series. The first episode is "The Judas Game".
- 15 September – The American sitcom Soap is for broadcast on ITV.
- 23 September – Larry Grayson succeeds Bruce Forsyth as presenter of The Generation Game.
- 30 September – The Saturday morning children's programme, Multi-Coloured Swap Shop returns for a third series with Maggie Philbin joining hosts Noel Edmonds and Keith Chegwin.

=== October ===
- 17 October – James Burke's history of science series Connections is first broadcast on BBC1.
- 18 October – Morecambe and Wise return to ITV for their long-running comedy sketch show The Morecambe & Wise Show.

=== November ===
- 6 November – ITV airs the first episode of Edward & Mrs. Simpson, a seven-part British television series that dramatises the events leading to the 1936 abdication of Edward VIII, who gave up his throne to marry the twice-divorced American Wallis Simpson.
- 10 November – Debut of Carla Lane's family sitcom Butterflies on BBC2, starring Wendy Craig.
- 13 November – The Association of Broadcasting Staffs imposes an overtime ban on its members working in BBC drama, news and current affairs after talks on pay rise have stalled. This results in blackout of early evening programmes on BBC2, before spreading to other programmes and on BBC1 by 14 December.
- 23 November – 15th anniversary of the first episode of the long-running science-fiction series Doctor Who.
- 27 November – The Times reports that News International will sell 16% of its share in London Weekend Television, reducing its shares from 39.7% to 25%.
- November – ITV starts broadcasting the ORACLE teletext service. It ends on 31 December 1992.

=== December ===
- 15 December – Scottish Television technical staff, who are members of the Association of Cinematograph, Television and Allied Technicians, impose an overtime ban over the company's use of freelance staff. This forces STV to go off the air at 4 p.m. today.
- 17 December – A strike forces Yorkshire Television off air throughout the entire Christmas period, with normal service not resumed on Yorkshire until 5.45pm on Wednesday 3 January 1979. Many of ITV's Christmas programmes are eventually shown on the channel in early 1979 after the dispute ends, but will be followed next summer by the 1979 ITV strike.
- 21–22 December – BBC1 and BBC2 are forced off the air due to industrial action at the BBC by the ABS union which starts on Thursday 21 December. The following day, the radio unions join their BBC Television counterparts, forcing the BBC to merge their four national radio networks into one national radio station, the BBC All Network Radio Service, from 4pm that afternoon. The strike is settled shortly before 10pm on 22 December with the unions and BBC management reaching an agreement at the British government's industrial disputes arbitration service ACAS. BBC1 resumes broadcast at 3pm on Saturday 23 December with BBC2 resuming at 1pm the same afternoon. Threat of disruption to the BBC's festive television schedules is averted. BBC Radio networks resume normal schedules on the morning of Saturday 23 December.
- 25 December
  - BBC1 airs the network television premiere of Rodgers and Hammerstein's 1965 family musical film The Sound of Music, starring Julie Andrews.
  - The UK television premiere of the 1971 James Bond film Diamonds Are Forever on ITV, starring Sean Connery in his final official appearance as 007. Viewers in Yorkshire see the film on 3 January 1979.
- 26 December
  - BBC1 screens the network television premiere of William Friedkin's 1971 Oscar winning crime thriller The French Connection, starring Gene Hackman and Roy Scheider.
  - ITV screens the UK television premiere of the 1973 film version of The Day of the Jackal
- 28 December – ITV airs the final episode of The Sweeney.

== Debuts ==
=== BBC1 ===
- 1 January – Rebecca of Sunnybrook Farm (1978)
- 2 January – Blake's 7 (1978–1981)
- 3 January – The Story of Perrine (1978)
- 4 January – A Traveller in Time (1978)
- 8 January – All Creatures Great and Small (1978–1990, 2020–present)
- 21 January – The Les Dawson Show (1978–1989)
- 29 January – Hawkmoor (1978)
- February – Grand Slam (1978)
- 8 February – Grange Hill (1978–2008)
- 24 February – Going Straight (1978)
- 1 March – The Hong Kong Beat (documentary) (1978)
- 7 March – Pennies from Heaven (1978)
- 9 March – Breakaway Girls (1978)
- 4 April – The Standard (1978)
- 10 April – Cheggers Plays Pop (1978–1986)
- 1 May – The Little and Large Show (1978–1991)
- 17 June – Lennie and Jerry (1978–1980)
- 5 September – Dallas (1978–1991)
- 10 September – Sexton Blake and the Demon God (1978)
- 18 September – Tycoon (1978)
- 20 September – Touch and Go (1978)
- 24 September – A Horseman Riding By (1978)
- 30 September – Scotch and Wry (1978–1992)
- 10 October – Space Sentinels (1977)
- 13 October – Rings on Their Fingers (1978–1980)
- 22 October – Huntingtower (1978)
- 25 October – The Hills of Heaven (1978)
- 15 November – The Moon Stallion (1978)
- 3 December – Pinocchio (1978)
- 31 December – The Mill on the Floss (1978–1979)

=== BBC2 ===
- 15 January – Ski Sunday (1978–2026)
- 17 January – In the Looking Glass (1978)
- 22 January – The Mayor of Casterbridge (1978)
- 11 March – Something Else (1978–1982)
- 6 April – Law & Order (1978)
- 17 April – Pickersgill People (1978)
- 30 April – The Devil's Crown (1978)
- 7 May – Grand Prix (1978–1996, 2009–2015)
- 5 June – An Englishman's Castle (1978)
- 19 September – Look and Read: Sky Hunter (1978)
- 20 September – Langrishe, Go Down (1978)
- 24 September – Wuthering Heights (1978)
- 11 October – The Lost Boys (1978)
- 26 October – Gauguin the Savage (1978)
- 30 October – And Now the Good News (1978)
- 31 October – Empire Road (1978)
- 31 October – The Voyage of Charles Darwin (1978)
- 2 November – Accident (1978)
- 10 November – Butterflies (1978–1983, 2000)
- 3 December – BBC Television Shakespeare (1978–1985)

=== ITV ===
- 3 January – Glad Day: A Celebration for William Blake (1978) (Musical drama)
- 7 January – Logan's Run (1978)
- 11 January – Cloppa Castle (1978–1979)
- 13 January – Maggie and Her (1978–1979)
- 14 January – The South Bank Show (1978–2010, 2012–present)
- 15 January – Do You Remember? (1978)
- 16 January – Hazell (1978–1979)
- 17 January – Wilde Alliance (1978)
- 21 January – Enemy at the Door (1978–1981)
- 22 January – The Prime of Miss Jean Brodie (1978)
- 20 February – Warrior Queen (1978)
- 21 February – Armchair Thriller (1978–1981)
- 23 February – Battleground (1978)
- 1 March – Send in the Girls (1978)
- 3 March – Mixed Blessings (1978–1980)
- 12 March – The Doombolt Chase (1978)
- 3 April – Rumpole of the Bailey (1978–1992)
- 23 April – Come Back, Lucy (1978)
- 29 April – Scorpion Tales (1978)
- 26 May – The Incredible Hulk (1977–1982)
- 5 June – Strangers (1978–1982)
- 13 June
  - Life Begins at Forty (1978–1980)
  - Will Shakespeare (1978)
- 3 July
  - The Famous Five (1978–1979)
  - The Kenny Everett Video Show (1978–1981)
- 8 July
  - The Law Centre (1978)
  - The Saturday Banana (1978)
- 9 July – William and Dorothy (1978)
- 13 July – Leave it to Charlie (1978–1980)
- 16 July – The Rime of the Ancient Mariner (1978)
- 18 July – Spearhead (1978–1981)
- 23 July – Parables (1978)
- 24 July – Out (1978)
- 29 July – 3-2-1 (1978–1988)
- 31 July – A Soft Touch (1978)
- 8 August – The Bass Player and the Blonde (1978)
- 5 September –Disraeli (1978)
- 7 September – Jabberjaw (1976–1978)
- 9 September
  - Saturday Night People (1978–1980)
  - The Bubblies (1978–1984)
- 10 September – Return of the Saint (1978–1979)
- 11 September – Cooper, Just Like That (1978)
- 13 September – Born and Bred (1978)
- 15 September – Soap (1977–1981)
- 18 September – The Sandbaggers (1978–1980)
- 24 September
  - Bless Me, Father (1978–1981)
  - Lillie (1978)
- 7 October – Bruce Forsyth's Big Night (1978, 1980)
- 8 October – The Clifton House Mystery (1978)
- 18 October – The Morecambe & Wise Show (1978–1983)
- 23 October – Bernie (1978–1980)
- 24 October – The Upchat Connection (1978)
- 1 November – The One and Only Phyllis Dixey (1978)
- 6 November – Edward and Mrs Simpson (1978)
- 12 November – The Losers (1978)
- 14 November – Fallen Hero (1978–1979)
- 2 December – By Alan Bennett – Six Plays (1978–1979)

== Continuing television shows ==
=== 1920s ===
- BBC Wimbledon (1927–1939, 1945–2019, 2021–present)

=== 1930s ===
- Trooping the Colour (1937–1939, 1945–2019, 2023–present)
- The Boat Race (1938–1939, 1945–2019, 2021–present)
- BBC Cricket (1939, 1945–1999, 2020–2024)

=== 1950s ===
- Come Dancing (1950–1998)
- The Good Old Days (1953–1983)
- Panorama (1953–present)
- Crackerjack (1955–1984, 2020–present)
- What the Papers Say (1956–2008)
- The Sky at Night (1957–present)
- Blue Peter (1958–present)
- Grandstand (1958–2007)

=== 1960s ===
- Coronation Street (1960–present)
- Songs of Praise (1961–present)
- Animal Magic (1962–1983)
- Doctor Who (1963–1989, 1996, 2005–present)
- World in Action (1963–1998)
- Top of the Pops (1964–2006)
- Match of the Day (1964–present)
- Crossroads (1964–1988, 2001–2003)
- Play School (1964–1988)
- Mr. and Mrs. (1965–1999)
- World of Sport (1965–1985)
- Jackanory (1965–1996, 2006)
- Sportsnight (1965–1997)
- It's a Knockout (1966–1982, 1999–2001)
- The Money Programme (1966–2010)
- ITV Playhouse (1967–1982)
- Reksio (1967–1990)
- Magpie (1968–1980)
- The Big Match (1968–2002)
- The Liver Birds (1969–1979, 1996)
- Nationwide (1969–1983)
- Screen Test (1969–1984)

=== 1970s ===
- The Goodies (1970–1982)
- The Onedin Line (1971–1980)
- The Old Grey Whistle Test (1971–1987)
- The Two Ronnies (1971–1987, 1991, 1996, 2005)
- General Hospital (1972–1979)
- Sykes (1972–1979)
- Thunderbirds (1972–1980, 1984–1987)
- Clapperboard (1972–1982)
- Crown Court (1972–1984)
- Pebble Mill at One (1972–1986, 1991–1996)
- Are You Being Served? (1972–1985)
- Rainbow (1972–1992, 1994–1997)
- Emmerdale (1972–present)
- Newsround (1972–present)
- Weekend World (1972–1988)
- Pipkins (1973–1981)
- We Are the Champions (1973–1987)
- Last of the Summer Wine (1973–2010)
- That's Life! (1973–1994)
- It Ain't Half Hot Mum (1974–1981)
- Tiswas (1974–1982)
- Wish You Were Here...? (1974–2003)
- Celebrity Squares (1975–1979, 1993–1997, 2014–2015)
- The Cuckoo Waltz (1975–1980)
- Arena (1975–present)
- Jim'll Fix It (1975–1994)
- Gambit (1975–1985, 1995)
- The Muppet Show (1976–1981)
- When the Boat Comes In (1976–1981)
- Multi-Coloured Swap Shop (1976–1982)
- Rentaghost (1976–1984)
- One Man and His Dog (1976–present)
- Robin's Nest (1977–1981)
- You're Only Young Twice (1977–1981)
- The Professionals (1977–1983)

== Ending this year ==
- 5 March – The Ghosts of Motley Hall (1976–1978)
- 20 March – Opportunity Knocks (1956–1978, 1987–1990)
- 10 April – 1990 (1977–1978)
- 15 April – Within These Walls (1974–1978)
- 9 May – Rising Damp (1974–1978)
- 24 May – A Bunch of Fives (1977–1978)
- 10 June – The Good Life (1975–1978)
- 21 July – The Black and White Minstrel Show (1958–1978)
- August – This Week (1956–1978, 1986–1992)
- 20 September – Z-Cars (1962–1978)
- 20 December – Happy Ever After (1974–1978)
- 25 December – Some Mothers Do 'Ave 'Em (1973–1978)
- 28 December – The Sweeney (1975–1978)
- 31 December – The Story of Perrine (1978)

== Births ==
- 22 February – Jenny Frost, singer, dancer, television presenter and model
- 23 March — Joanna Page, actress
- 31 March – Daniel Mays, actor
- 28 April — Lauren Laverne, radio and television presenter and singer
- 29 May — Adam Rickitt, actor
- 10 July — Sarah-Jane Mee, journalist and news and sports presenter
- 11 July — Dustin Demri-Burns, actor, comedian and writer
- 24 July — Joanna Taylor, actress and model
- 19 August — Callum Blue, actor
- 8 November — Jane Danson, actress
- 17 November – Tom Ellis, actor

== Deaths ==
- 11 January – Michael Bates, actor (born 1920)
- 21 July – Henry Longhurst, golf commentator (born 1909)
- 5 October – May Warden, actress (born 1891)
- 1 December – David Nixon, magician (born 1919)

== See also ==
- 1978 in British music
- 1978 in British radio
- 1978 in the United Kingdom
- List of British films of 1978
