= Jane Hayden =

English stage, television, and film actress (born 1957)

Jane Hayden (born 1957) is an English stage, television, and film actress.

== Early life ==
Hayden was born in Harrow, Middlesex, the younger sister of Linda Hayden, although their name at birth was Higginson. Their screen surname is an adaptation of their father's first name; he was Haydn Henley Higginson. Both sisters trained at the Aida Foster Theatre School, and Jane Hayden's first screen role came in 1970, when she played a child in a BBC television film about Lenin, Out of This Spark: The Making of a Revolutionary.

== Filmography ==
- Out of This Spark: The Making of a Revolutionary (BBC, 1970) as Child
- Warship (1973) as Samantha
- The Awakening of Emily (1976) as Rachel
- Confessions of a Pop Performer (1975) as Girl at Crossing
- Adventures of a Taxi Driver (1976) as Linda
- Robin's Nest (1977) as Air Hostess
- Killer's Moon (1978) as Julie
- Return of the Saint (1978) as Aileen
- Shillingbury Tales (1981) as Emily
