= Tom Marshall (actor) =

British actor

- Education: LAMDA
- Years active: 1968–present
- Spouse: Tamara Hinchco
- Children: 1

Tom Marshall is a British actor playing in the National Theatre, West End theatre, Royal Court Theatre, and Menier Chocolate Factory.

He was nominated for the 2016 Offie for It Is Easy To Be Dead.

His film credits include roles in There's a Girl in My Soup (1970), Revenge (1971) and the cult horror film Killer's Moon (1978). In 1972, Marshall appeared as William in an episode of Upstairs, Downstairs entitled "I Dies from Love".
