= Killer's Moon =

1978 British horror film directed by Alan Birkinshaw

- Theatrical poster
- Directed by: Alan Birkinshaw
- Screenplay by: Alan Birkinshaw
- Produced by: Alan Birkinshaw; Gordon Keymer
- Starring: Anthony Forrest; Tom Marshall; Jane Hayden; Alison Elliott; David Jackson; JoAnne Good; Lisa Vanderpump
- Cinematography: Arthur Lavis
- Edited by: David White
- Music by: John Shakespeare
- Production company: Rothernorth Films
- Distributed by: Rothernorth Films
- Release date: 8 December 1978
- Running time: 90 minutes
- Country: United Kingdom
- Language: English

Killer's Moon is a 1978 British slasher film written and directed by Alan Birkinshaw, with uncredited dialogue written by his novelist sister, Fay Weldon, and starring Anthony Forrest, Tom Marshall, Jane Hayden, JoAnne Good, Nigel Gregory, David Jackson and Lisa Vanderpump. It follows a group of schoolgirls on a choir trip who are terrorized by four escaped psychiatric patients on LSD while staying in a remote hotel in the Lake District.

== Plot ==
A large bus full of schoolgirls breaks down in the Lake District, forcing the girls to take shelter for the night in a remote hotel. Meanwhile, strange and macabre acts of violence are occurring to the locals and their pets, perpetrated by four escaped mental patients—Mr. Smith, Mr. Trubshaw, Mr. Muldoon and Mr. Jones—who have been dosed with LSD as part of their treatment. The four men, roaming the area, are convinced they are living a shared dream in which they are free to engage in their demented fantasies of rape and murder.

After the girls are taken into the hotel, a gamekeeper is brutally murdered with a hatchet. Shortly after, Jones attacks one of the hotelkeepers, who manages to slash him across the face before he strangles her to death. Meanwhile, one of the girls, Sandy, discovers the gamekeeper's body in the woods, and encounters Mike, a benevolent tourist who is camping nearby with his friends, Julie, and the American Pete. The two men attempt to calm Sandy, and subsequently find Julie in a disturbed state, having been attacked by the four escaped patients.

Meanwhile, the other eight girls rehearse their recital before going to bed. Mary ventures downstairs where she finds Smith, Trubshaw, and Muldoon having killed one of the chaperones. Another of the chaperones, Mrs. Hargreaves, finds Smith sexually assaulting Mary. The patients kill Mrs. Hargreaves when she attempts to intervene, and incapacitate chaperone Miss Lilac in the process. Jones arrives at the hotel during the melee. Anne, Elizabeth, and Agatha, discovering the invasion, barricade themselves in their room.

While Mike goes to retrieve a shotgun from his car, Pete travels on foot to the hotel, seeking help, and is confronted by Mr. Jones, who attacks him. Shortly after, the four assailants, still holding Mary captive, attempt to coax Anne, Elizabeth, and Agatha out of their room by shouting that a fire has broken out in the hotel. Pete finds two other girls in their room, and helps them escape from an upstairs window. Agatha taunts Mr. Trubshaw, distracting him while her friends escape and hide in the woods. Pete attempts to lure Mr. Jones away from the girls, but Jones chases them and they become separated. Eventually Jones strangles one girl whom he corners against a lake.

Jones stumbles upon the campsite where a terrified Sandy and Julie hide in a tent, but he is killed by a three-legged Doberman Pinscher that the men had recently mutilated. Mike arrives and orders Sandy and Julie to depart toward the village. Mike reunites with Pete at the hotel where Smith, Trubshaw, and Muldoon are raping Anne. Smith comes to the realization that the men are not in a dream, which he declares to Trubshaw and Muldoon. Pete, meanwhile, hides the girls in the basement where the attackers soon locate them.

A fire breaks out in the basement, diverting the men and allowing the girls to flee with Mike, while Smith, now again believing he is in a dream, allows himself to burn to death. The girls are escorted to a barn by Mike, while Pete returns to the hotel to save Miss Lilac and obtain Mike's shotgun. Pete is confronted by Trubshaw, who shoots him, injuring him. Trubshaw chases Pete into the woods and attempts to stab him to death, but is killed by Agatha, who has come to Pete's aid armed with a sickle.

At dawn, Miss Lilac, having regained consciousness, finds Smith's burnt corpse in the basement. Mike and Julie stumble upon the scene shortly after, finding Muldoon clinging to Smith's body. Agatha accompanies the injured Pete back to the hotel. Pete, Agatha, Miss Lilac, Mike, and Julie, stand outside the hotel in a daze as a police officers arrives.

== Cast ==
- Anthony Forrest as Pete
- Tom Marshall as Mike
- Jane Hayden as Julie
- Alison Elliott as Sandy
- Georgina Kean as Agatha
- JoAnne Good as Mary
- Nigel Gregory as Mr. Smith
- David Jackson as Mr. Trubshaw
- Paul Rattee as Mr. Muldoon
- Peter Spraggon as Mr. Jones
- Jayne Lester as Elizabeth
- Lisa Vanderpump as Anne
- Debbie Martyn as Deirdre
- Christine Winter as Carol (credited as Christina Jones)
- Lynne Morgan as Sue
- Jean Reeve as Mrs. Hargreaves
- Elizabeth Counsell as Miss Lilac
- Hilda Braid as Mrs. May
- Chubby Oates as Bus Driver
- James Kerry as Psychiatrist
- Hugh Ross as Government Minister

== Production ==
During the mid-to-late 1970s, maverick directors such as Pete Walker and Norman J. Warren were trying to spice up the much-derided genre of British horror films. These films would later be dubbed "New Wave" British horror, on account that they pushed the boundaries of taste as much as was possible within the British Board of Film Classification's strict regime and were set in modern-day 1970s Britain and centered on 20-30 aged protagonists, differing them from the predominantly period piece horrors of Hammer Films Productions that had gone before. Alan Birkinshaw had begun his career in commercials, moving on to directing and producing Confessions of a Sex Maniac in 1974. He viewed making horror films as a natural progression. "We decided that the horror film (genre) was more up market than a sex comedy," he told Creeping Flesh in 2003. Birkinshaw's film has been cited as combinings elements of Kubrick's A Clockwork Orange, the notorious American sleaze epic Carnal Madness (which was released in Britain as The Sizzlers), and a low-rent, late-period Carry On film. However, by adding (faked) animal cruelty and the flippant treatment of rape, Birkinshaw created what was described in Matthew Sweet's book Shepperton Babylon as the most tasteless movie in British cinema history.

Killer's Moon was shot off season at Armathwaite Hall in the Lake District. The eclectic cast includes David Jackson, Jane Hayden (sister of cult actress Linda Hayden), JoAnne Good, future restaurateur Lisa Vanderpump, Hilda Braid, comedian Chubby Oates and Hannah the three legged dog. Hannah the three legged dog in the film, was originally a pub dog who had lost a leg as the result of a shotgun wound sustained during an armed robbery. She was later awarded the doggy Victoria Cross award for bravery.

== Release ==
Killer's Moon opened theatrically in London on 8 December 1978. It was screened alongside The Last Hard Men as a support feature. It also played in some cinemas as a supporting feature to the 1977 William Devane film Rolling Thunder.

=== Censorship ===
Killer's Moon was met with controversy from the British Board of Film Classification (BBFC), particularly for its depiction of rape involving minors. Actress Jayne Lester, whose character is sexually assaulted in the film, was mandated by the BBFC to provide her birth certificate to prove she was over the age of 16 when the film was shot. Furthermore, the production company, Rothernorth Films, was ordered to provide proof that no animals were harmed during the making of the film, as it depicts the abuse and mutilation of a cat, as well as a three-legged dog. Once these requirements were met, the film was granted an X rating.

=== Critical response ===
==== Revival ====
In the late 1990s, Killer's Moon began to receive write-ups in magazines like Flesh and Blood and Nekrofile: Cinema of the Extreme.

Killer's Moon received a rare UK cinema screening in 2001 as part of the 'Ten Years of Terror' one-day film convention held at the Riverside Studios in Hammersmith, London. The convention was a tie-in event for the publication of the book Ten Years of Terror: British Horror Films of the 1970s, which reprinted the Flesh and Blood review ("a film that flouts good taste and decency with crude bravado, remaining perversely entertaining".)

Creeping Flesh, a book format look at horror and fantasy films published by Headpress in 2003 carried a lengthy article on the film (‘Hungry in a Dream’) followed by an interview with Alan Birkinshaw. Creeping Flesh was originally going to be titled Three Legged Dog, in honor of "Hannah, the pooch in Killer's Moon", but the title was later changed because it was felt that the reference was too obscure. A motif of a three-legged dog, however, appears at the beginning of each chapter.

=== Home media ===
In 2008, Redemption Films released Killer's Moon on DVD in both the US and UK. The film was presented in a new remastered edition created from original materials and garnered critical acclaim. The release included a plethora of extras including director and cast interviews, as well as an audio commentary by director Birkinshaw, actress JoAnne Good, and moderator James Blackford. The film was passed uncut by the BBFC for the DVD release.

It was re-released on Blu-ray through Kino Lorber under their Redemption Films sub-label in 2012.

== Sources ==
- Barber, Sian (2011). Censoring the 1970s: The BBFC and the Decade that Taste Forgot. Cambridge, England: Cambridge Scholars Publishing. ISBN 978-1-443-83397-4.
- Cook, David A. (2002). Lost Illusions: American Cinema in the Shadow of Watergate and Vietnam, 1970-1979. Berkeley, California: University of California Press. ISBN 978-0-520-23265-5.
