= 20 Golden Greats (Buddy Holly & The Crickets album) =

Greatest hits album by Buddy Holly & the Crickets
- Released: February 17, 1978
- Recorded: 1956–1958
- Genre: Rock and roll
- Length: 45:16
- Label: EMI
- Producer: Norman Petty
- Compiler: John Beecher

Buddy Holly chronology
Buddy Holly: A Rock & Roll Collection (1972)	20 Golden Greats (1978)	The Complete Buddy Holly (1979)

The Crickets chronology
A Long Way From Lubbock (1974)	20 Golden Greats (1978)	The Complete Crickets (1984)

Professional ratings
Review scores
Source	Rating
Allmusic	4.5/5 stars

20 Golden Greats (also known as Buddy Holly Lives) is a greatest hits album by Buddy Holly & the Crickets first released in the United Kingdom by EMI on February 17, 1978. The songs on the UK release were licensed to EMI by MCA Records, who released the album in North America. The album is now out of print.

The album became an instant success in the UK, being certified platinum by the British Phonographic Industry two months after the album's release and topping the UK Albums Chart for three weeks. It was also Buddy Holly's first number 1 album on the chart. The album was somewhat less successful in the United States peaking at number 55 on the Billboard 200, but ended up crossing over to the Country Albums chart, and was certified gold by the Recording Industry Association of America in 1983. In 2003, it was ranked number 92 on Rolling Stone magazine's list of The 500 Greatest Albums of All Time, maintaining the ranking in the 2012 update and dropping to number 166 in the 2020 reboot of the list.

== Track listing ==
Side 1
No.	Title	Writer(s)	Original album	Length
1.	"That'll Be the Day"	Jerry Allison, Buddy Holly, Norman Petty	The "Chirping" Crickets	2:16
2.	"Peggy Sue"	Allison, Holly, Petty	Buddy Holly	2:35
3.	"Words of Love"	Holly	Buddy Holly	2:01
4.	"Everyday"	Charles Hardin, Petty	Buddy Holly	2:12
5.	"Not Fade Away"	Petty, Hardin	The "Chirping" Crickets	2:25
6.	"Oh, Boy!"	Petty, Sonny West, Bill Tilghman	The "Chirping" Crickets	2:11
7.	"Maybe Baby"	Petty, Holly	The "Chirping" Crickets	2:06
8.	"Listen to Me"	Hardin, Petty	Buddy Holly	2:26
9.	"Heartbeat"	Bob Montgomery, Petty	The Buddy Holly Story	2:13
10.	"Think It Over"	Holly, Petty	The Buddy Holly Story	1:51

Side 2
No.	Title	Writer(s)	Original album	Length
1.	"It Doesn't Matter Anymore"	Paul Anka	The Buddy Holly Story	2:16
2.	"It's So Easy"	Holly, Petty	The Buddy Holly Story	2:14
3.	"Well... All Right"	Holly, Allison, Petty, Joe B. Mauldin	The Buddy Holly Story Volume II	2:18
4.	"Rave On"	West, Tilghman, Petty	Buddy Holly	1:53
5.	"Raining in My Heart"	Felice and Boudleaux Bryant	The Buddy Holly Story	2:52
6.	"True Love Ways"	Petty, Holly	The Buddy Holly Story Volume II	2:51
7.	"Peggy Sue Got Married"	Holly	The Buddy Holly Story Volume II	2:10
8.	"Bo Diddley"	Ellas McDaniel	Reminiscing	2:24
9.	"Brown Eyed Handsome Man"	Chuck Berry	Reminiscing	2:07
10.	"Wishing"	Holly, Montgomery	Holly In The Hills	2:08

== Charts and certifications ==
Chart (1978)	Peak position
Canadian 100 Albums	31
Canadian Country Albums	17
UK Albums Chart	1
US Billboard 200	55
US Country Albums	20

Organization	Level	Date
BPI – U.K.	Silver	April 4, 1978
BPI – U.K.	Gold	April 4, 1978
BPI – U.K.	Platinum	April 4, 1978
RIAA – U.S.	Gold	November 14, 1983

== Release history ==
Region	Date	Label	Format	Catalog
United Kingdom	February 17, 1978	MCA	LP	EMTV 8
United Kingdom	February 17, 1978	MCA	Cassette	TC-MCTV1
North America	1978	MCA	LP	MCA-3040
North America	1978	MCA	Cassette	MCAC-3040
North America	1978	MCA	8-track	MCAT-3040
United Kingdom	February, 1989	MCA	CD	DMCTV 1
