= 1906 in British music =

This is a summary of 1906 in music in the United Kingdom.

== Events ==
- 18 January - The first performance of Charles Villiers Stanford’s Symphony No 6 in Eb major takes place at the Queen’s Hall with the London Symphony Orchestra conducted by the composer.
- 25 January - The Kruse Quartet, supplemented by other players (including Lionel Tertis), give the first performance of Charles Villiers Stanford‘s Nonet at the Aeolian Hall in London.
- 1 March - Nicholas Gatty‘s one-act opera Greysteel has its premiere in Sheffield during the University Opera week.
- 29 March - The first performance of James Friskin‘s Quintet by the Cathie Quartet takes place at the Aeolian Hall in London.
- 24 April - The winning three compositions of the 1905 Cobbett Competition for chamber music are performed by The Saunders Quartet at Stationers Hall: William Hurlstone‘s Phantasie for String Quartet (first prize); Haydn Wood‘s Phantasy Quartet (second prize); Frank Bridge‘s Phantasie Quartet (third prize).
- 14 May - The first complete performance in the UK of Coppelia by Delibes is seen at the Empire Theatre, with Adeline Genée in the lead role.
- 14 June - The first performance of Variations on an African Air by Samuel Coleridge-Taylor takes place at a London Philharmonic Society concert, Queen's Hall, conducted by Frederick Cowen.
- 23 August - The Norfolk Rhapsody No 1 in E minor by Ralph Vaughan Williams is performed for the first time at the Proms in London.
- August – Mary Davies is principal soloist at the National Eisteddfod of Wales.
- Summer – Australian composer Percy Grainger begins collecting English folk songs with the aid of a phonograph.
- 3 October
  - Hans Richter conducts the first performance of The Bells, a poem for chorus and orchestra by Joseph Holbrooke, at the Birmingham Music Festival.
  - Edward Elgar's oratorio The Kingdom, Op. 51, is first performed at the Birmingham Music Festival, conducted by the composer with soloists Agnes Nicholls, Muriel Foster, John Coates and William Higley.
- 25 October - Henry Wood conducts the first performance of Joseph Holbrooke’s orchestral suite Les Hommages at Queen’s Hall.
- 14 November -The Vicar of Wakefield (Goldsmith), a light opera by Liza Lehmann, is produced in London.
- 15 November - Cyril Scott's orchestral and choral Christmas Overture is performed for the first time by the London Symphony Orchestra.
- date unknown
  - Operatic soprano Maggie Teyte makes her public début at a Mozart festival in Paris.
  - 16-year-old Phyllis Dare takes over the leading role in The Belle of Mayfair at the Vaudeville Theatre when Edna May leaves suddenly because of a disagreement with the producer.
  - Composer Lawrence Wright opens a music shop in his home city of Leicester.

== Popular music ==
- "Ye Watchers and Ye Holy Ones" (hymn), with words by Athelstan Riley, first published in The English Hymnal by Oxford University Press, edited by Percy Dearmer and Ralph Vaughan Williams.

== Classical music: new works ==
- Granville Bantock – Sappho, nine fragments with a Prelude
- Rutland Boughton – Love in Spring, symphonic poem
- Frank Bridge
  - Three Idylls for String Quartet
  - String Quartet No. 1 in E minor "Bologna"
- Katharine Emily Eggar – Piano Quartet in D minor and major
- Edward Elgar – The Kingdom (oratorio)

== Opera ==
- Dame Ethel Smyth & Henry Brewster – The Wreckers

== Musical theatre ==
- 20 June – See See, with music by Sidney Jones, book by Charles H. Brookfield, and lyrics by Adrian Ross, opens at the Prince of Wales Theatre; it runs for 152 performances.

== Births ==
- 31 January – Benjamin Frankel, composer (died 1973)
- 19 February – Grace Williams, composer (died 1977)
- 13 March – Dave Kaye, pianist (died 1996)
- 22 April – Eric Fenby, composer, conductor, pianist, organist and teacher, amanuensis of Frederick Delius (died 1997)
- 9 July – Elisabeth Lutyens, composer (died 2005)
- 24 August – Walter Braithwaite, composer (died 1991)
- 4 November – Arnold Cooke, composer (died 1983)
- 23 November – Mervyn Roberts, Welsh composer

== Deaths ==
- 9 May – Helen Lemmens-Sherrington, concert and operatic soprano (born 1834)
- 14 June – George Herbert, organist and composer of hymn tunes (born 1817)
- 30 December – Eugène Goossens, père, Belgian-born conductor (born 1845)

== See also ==
- 1906 in the United Kingdom
