= Wyatt's Watchdogs =

1988 British TV sitcom

- Opening title
- Created by: Miles Tredinnick (Writer); Alan J. W. Bell (Director, Producer)
- Starring: Brian Wilde; Trevor Bannister; Anne Ridler; April Walker; David Jackson; James Warrior; Tom Radcliffe
- Country of origin: United Kingdom
- Original language: English
- No. of series: 1
- No. of episodes: 6

Production
- Running time: 30 minutes per episode

Original release
- Network: BBC1
- Release: 17 October – 21 November 1988

Wyatt's Watchdogs is a BBC1 sitcom starring Brian Wilde and Trevor Bannister. Created and written by Miles Tredinnick, the six-episode series was transmitted in 1988. Alan J. W. Bell produced and directed the series, and the music was composed by Ronnie Hazlehurst.

Although not initially written with him in mind, the series was developed as a vehicle for Wilde after he had left the cast of Last of the Summer Wine three years prior. Although initially getting passable ratings, the BBC felt that the sitcom had not really caught on, and it was dropped after one series; Wilde returned to Last of the Summer Wine in 1990.

== Overview ==
The show is set in the fictional commuter village of Bradly Bush, although was actually filmed on location in Claygate, Surrey, England.

Retired soldier Major John Wyatt (Brian Wilde) is spurred into action after his sister Edwina's (Anne Ridler) home is burgled in broad daylight. Ignoring correct police procedures, he forms his own Neighbourhood Watch group of incompetents and patrols the streets in his Range Rover known locally as the 'Dogmobile'. The Watch members are a hopeless bunch drawn together to fight crime, and bungling and personality clashes are highly evident. Brian Wilde as Major Wyatt clashes worst of all with Peter Pitt (Trevor Bannister), a smooth-talking womaniser and burglar-alarm salesman. Other regular characters include the glamorous man-eater Virginia (April Walker), an interfering Vicar (David Jackson), and a frustrated police sergeant, Springer (James Warrior).

The show actually had the working title of Every Street Should Have One but this was changed at the last minute to Wyatt's Watchdogs, The reason being that the BBC were transmitting the programme on Monday evenings straight after ITV's Coronation Street but before another BBC show called Streets Apart.

Much of the series was devised to act as a vehicle for Wilde, who had left his role as Foggy Dewhurst in Last of the Summer Wine in 1985 over creative differences with Alan J. W. Bell. The character of Wyatt shared a number of similarities with Foggy, particularly with them both having a military background, although Wyatt was far more assertive and not afraid of conflict as Foggy was.

Although it performed moderately in its time-slot, the BBC felt – who had hoped that, starring Wilde, it would have gained much of Last of the Summer Wine’s viewing figures – that the programme had not really caught on with viewers, and it was dropped after its initial series.

However, with the production of this series, Wilde and Bell managed to settle their differences regarding Last of the Summer Wine, and two years later in 1990, when the next series of Summer Wine was due to start filming and actor Michael Aldridge left the show to look after his sick wife, Wilde agreed to return as Foggy Dewhurst, staying with the series for seven more years. Trevor Bannister would later become a regular cast member of Last of the Summer Wine as the golf captain.

== Episodes and cast ==
All episodes star Brian Wilde, Trevor Bannister, Anne Ridler, April Walker, James Warrior and David Jackson.

1. "One Big, One Not So Big"
  Tom Radcliffe, Peter O'Sullevan (voice only), Julia Binstead and Sarah Whitlock.
2. "Getting Out And Spreading The Word"
  Noel Johnson, Lisa Bloor, Deborah Lavin, Frank Tregear, Richard Kane, Mary Blatchford, Ian Redford, Margaret Ashley, Helena McCarthy, Gabrielle Blunt and Aimée Delamain.
3. "Mark It Or Bust!" (Directed by Andy Smith)
  Eva Stuart, Timothy Carlton and Andrew Reardon.
4. "There Are Fairy Cakes at the Bottom of My Garden"
  Robin Parkinson, Julie Morgan and Diana Fulker.
5. "Just Act Natural"
  Frederick Treves, Keith Smith, Russell Wootton, Richard Davies, Belinda Lee, Pamela Dale, Charles Appleby and Frank Tregear.
6. "A Clot on the Landscape"
  Clive Mantle, Claire Lacey, Martin Benson and Roger Ostime.

== DVD release ==
As of 2025, the series has not yet been released on DVD.
