= David Jackson (actor) =

English actor (1934–2005)

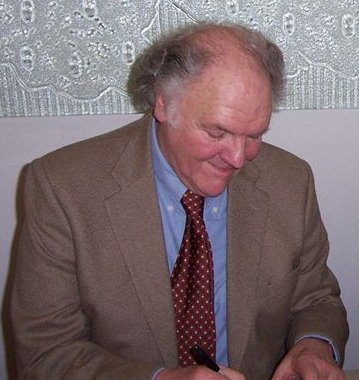
- David Jackson at the Blake's 7 series 2 DVD launch, 2005
- Born: 15 July 1934; Liverpool, Lancashire, England
- Died: 25 July 2005 (aged 71); London, England
- Education: LAMDA
- Occupation: Actor
- Years active: 1960-1994
- Spouse: Anne Jackson
- Children: 1

David Jackson (15 July 1934 – 25 July 2005) was an English actor best known for his role as Olag Gan in the first two series of Blake's 7 and as Detective Constable Braithwaite in Z-Cars from 1972 to 1978. He was born in Liverpool, Lancashire (now Merseyside).

His other TV credits include The Saint, The Avengers, The Sweeney, Lord Peter Wimsey (The Nine Tailors), Space: 1999, Only Fools and Horses, Wyatt's Watchdogs, Edge of Darkness, Coronation Street and Lovejoy.

Jackson made two appearances in Minder. His first appearance was in 1979 as Big Stan in the episode The Smaller They Are. This was followed by a further appearance in 1985, in the episode Give Us This Day Arthur Daley's Bread, in which he played an ex-con named Marion.

His film credits include roles in 10 Rillington Place (1971), Unman, Wittering and Zigo (1971), Blood from the Mummy's Tomb (1971), Night Watch (1973), The Big Sleep (1978) and the cult horror film Killer's Moon (1978).

In 2002, he provided his voice talent to the audio drama Sarah Jane Smith: Comeback, part of the Doctor Who audio spin-offs by Big Finish Productions. Jackson was a science-fiction fan throughout his career and was happy to be associated with Blake's 7 years after the series ended.

In 1988 he played the Vicar alongside Brian Wilde in six episodes of the BBC1 sitcom Wyatt's Watchdogs. His great passion was for Victorian theatre and at one stage he produced and starred in a one-man show. Other theatre appearances included roles at the Old Vic, the Royal Court, the RSC and in the West End.

David Jackson died of a heart attack on 25 July 2005, aged 71.

== Filmography ==
- Redcap (TV Series) (1966) - Private MacGregor
- 10 Rillington Place (1971) - Police: Constable
- Unman, Wittering and Zigo (1971) - Clackworth
- Blood from the Mummy's Tomb (1971) - Young Male Nurse
- Night Watch (1973) - Wilson
- Killer's Moon (1978) - Mr Trubshaw
- The Big Sleep (1978) - Detective Willis (uncredited)
- Danger on Dartmoor (1980)
- Breakout (1984) - Donny the Bull
