= House of Yes =

House of Yes may refer to:

- The House of Yes (play), a play written by Wendy MacLeod
  - The House of Yes, a 1997 film based on the play
- House of Yes: Live from House of Blues, live album by prog-rock band Yes
- House of Yes (Brooklyn), a nightclub in Brooklyn, New York, USA
