= The Sailor's Return (film) =

1978 film by Jack Gold

- Directed by: Jack Gold
- Screenplay by: James Saunders
- Based on: The Sailor's Return (1925 novel) by David Garnett
- Produced by: Otto Plaschkes
- Starring: Tom Bell; Shope Shodeinde
- Cinematography: Brian Tufano
- Edited by: Michael Taylor
- Music by: Carl Davis
- Production companies: Euston Films; Ariel Productions National Film Finance Corporation
- Release date: 30 November 1978 (London Film Festival)
- Running time: 112 minutes
- Country: United Kingdom
- Language: English

The Sailor's Return is a 1978 British drama film directed by Jack Gold and starring Tom Bell, Shope Shodeinde and Elton Charles. It was written by James Saunders based οn the 1925 novel The Sailor's Return by David Garnett.

According to the British Film Institute the film was originally intended for theatrical release but was eventually released on TV.

== Premise ==
A sailor returns to his hometown to open a pub bringing with him his new black wife. Very quickly they find themselves ostracised by the community.

== Cast ==
- Tom Bell as William Targett
- Shope Shodeinde as Princess Tulip
- Elton Charles as Billy / Olu Targett
- Denyse Alexander as Mrs. Cherret
- Julia Swift as Annie
- Pat Keen as Mrs. Bascombe
- Nigel Hawthorne as Mr. Fosse
- Jill Spurrier as Mrs. Frickes
- Ray Smith as Fred Leake
- Mick Ford as Tom Madgwick
- Peter Benson as Charlie Nye
- Ann Way as Mrs. Clall
- Paola Dionisotti as Lucy Sturmey
- George Costigan as Harry Targett
- Clive Swift as Reverend Pottock
- Victor Winding as ship's captain

== Production ==
The film was made by Euston Films, a subsidiary of Thames Television, with support from the National Film Finance Corporation.

The budget of the film was £400,000.

== Release ==
The film was selected to close the 1978 London Film Festival on 30 November 1978. It was also screened at a film festival in Cambridge but failed to secure cinema distribution before being screened on television. By 1982 it had secured a UK theatrical release.

== Reception ==
=== Box office ===
Distributor receipts as at the end of 1978 were £46,152.

=== Critical ===
Variety wrote: "The quiet pace may be only fruited for TV exposure, and Sailor's Return will not return b.o coin as did [Gold's] zany, satirical National Health, Man Friday, and even Naked Civil Servant. ... Tom Bell scores as the sailor Target, and Shope Shodeinde (a native Nigerian) as the African princess brings credibility but hardly sparkle to Tulip, a lively flower that must slowly wither in a foreign climate with the accumulation of disappointments and unawaited hostility."

Ann Ogidi wrote for the British Film Institute: "The Sailor's Return, set in the early days of the reign of Queen Victoria provides an unusual historical representation of a black person's experience of England. The contrasts are well handled, with young bride Tulip (played by newcomer Shope Shodeinde), struggling under the dual challenges of implacable hostility from the outside and the unravelling of her marriage at home. ... Shodeinde is very good in the role and brings a zest and liveliness to the film. Tom Bell is impressive as her husband William Taggart, a brave, honourable man but with an obstinate blindness to the real world troubles around him. The real star of the film is the English landscape, beautifully rendered by Director of Photography Brian Tufano, was filmed on location at Upper Slaughter in the Cotswolds. ... This particular location provides familiar 'olde England' features of rolling hills and neat stone cottages, picturesque streams and hay fields. However, the relentless charm offensive is offset by an exceptionally acidic story."
