= The National Health (play) =

1969 play written by Peter Nichols

- Original language: English
- Written by: Peter Nichols
- Genre: Black comedy

Premiere
- Date: 1969
- Place: The Old Vic

The National Health is a 1969 British play by Peter Nichols. Reminiscent of the Carry On film series, this black comedy with tragic overtones focuses on the appalling conditions in an under-funded National Health Service hospital, which are contrasted comically with a Dr. Kildare-style soap opera airing on the ward television.

== History ==
Originally titled The End Beds, the play – based on Nichols' time in hospitals where he received treatment for a collapsed lung – originally was written for television, but the playwright received no enthusiastic response from anyone to whom he submitted it. When Kenneth Tynan and Laurence Olivier approached him to write a play for the National Theatre, Nichols offered them the slightly revised work, retitled The National Health. It premiered at The Old Vic in 1969 and proved to be a critical and commercial success, named Best New Play by the Evening Standard. The BBC then asked Nichols if he would adapt the play for a television production.

In 1973, Nichols adapted his play for a film version directed by Jack Gold. It starred Jim Dale, Bob Hoskins, Lynn Redgrave, Donald Sinden, Clive Swift, Mervyn Johns, Eleanor Bron, Gillian Barge and Colin Blakely. It won the Evening Standard British Film Award for Best Comedy.

After 23 previews, the Broadway production, produced by Theodore Mann and directed by Arvin Brown, opened on 10 October 1974 at the Circle in the Square Theatre, where it ran for only 53 performances; its subject matter perplexed sophisticated theater-goers. The cast included Leonard Frey, Olivia Cole, and Rita Moreno. Tony Award nominations went to the play, Brown, and Frey; the play also received a Drama Desk Award nomination as Outstanding New Foreign Play.

== Awards and nominations ==
=== Original Broadway production ===
Year	Award	Category	Nominee	Result
1975	Drama Desk Award	Outstanding Play		Nominated
1975	Drama Desk Award	Outstanding Featured Actor in a Play	Louis Beachner	Nominated
1975	Tony Award	Best Play		Nominated
1975	Tony Award	Best Actor in a Play	Leonard Frey	Nominated
1975	Tony Award	Best Direction of a Play	Arvin Brown	Nominated
