= Goodnight Mister Tom (film) =

1998 British TV film directed by Jack Gold

- British DVD cover
- Based on: Goodnight Mister Tom by Michelle Magorian
- Written by: Brian Finch
- Directed by: Jack Gold
- Starring: John Thaw; Nick Robinson
- Music by: Carl Davis
- Country of origin: United Kingdom
- Original language: English

Production
- Producer: Chris Burt
- Editor: Jamie McCoan
- Running time: 101 minutes
- Production company: Carlton Television

Original release
- Network: ITV
- Release: 25 October 1998

Goodnight Mister Tom is a 1998 British film adaptation by Carlton Television of the novel of the same name by Michelle Magorian. The film is set during World War II and is about a young evacuee named William Beech who is placed in the care of a reclusive widower, Tom Oakley, in a rural English village, where he gradually finds love and healing after escaping an abusive home. It was Jack Gold's final film as a director.

The cast featured well-known British actors, including veteran actor John Thaw, who played a bearded character for the first time in his career. Filming took place during April and May 1998 in the village of Turville, chosen due to practical and aesthetic reasons.

Critical reviews were mixed, with critics finding the story and conclusion of the film predictable, although with praise for the cast performances, particularly Thaw.

== Plot ==
In September 1939, as Britain declares war on Nazi Germany, children are evacuated from London to the countryside of England for safety. One of them, William "Willie" Beech, is sent to the rural village of Little Weirwold in Suffolk, where he is placed in the care of Tom Oakley, an elderly widower who has lived in solitude since losing his wife and five-year-old son to scarlet fever during the First World War more than 20 years earlier.

William, a quiet and nervous boy, has grown up in poverty and suffered cruel treatment at the hands of his mother. He is initially apprehensive of Tom, and is fearful that he will suffer similar treatment at his hands.

Despite his initial reluctance, Tom grows sympathetic after discovering that William's mother had packed a leather belt for Tom to beat him with. He angrily discards the belt in the garden and begins to care for William, providing new clothes, education and a sense of stability. Over time, William gains confidence, forms a close bond with Tom, and makes friends with other villagers, including Zacharias "Zach" Wrench, a Jewish boy of a similar age who has also been evacuated from London. Shortly after William's 10th birthday, Tom receives a letter from Mrs Beech, claiming that she is ill and requesting William's return to London.

Back in London, William discovers his mother is not ill but instead has grown increasingly unstable in his absence. She reveals a baby girl - a "present from Jesus" - who has been born during William's absence. After discovering the belt is missing, Mrs Beech sends William to his room for the night. The next morning, after discovering that William interacted with girls and a Jewish boy, Mrs Beech punishes him by locking him in a cupboard under the stairs. Meanwhile, Tom grows increasingly worried after not receiving any letters from William; he senses that William is in danger after digging up the discarded belt and travels to London with his dog, Sammy.

Following a night in an air raid shelter and with help from an A.R.P. Warden named Ralph, Tom locates William’s home, discovering from a neighbour who was unaware that William had returned to London, that Mrs Beech had left her home a few days earlier to travel to the seaside. After Sammy continually scratches and whines at the door, Tom breaks in with Ralph, detecting a foul smell. Sammy leads Tom and Ralph to the locked cupboard under the stairs, where they find William severely beaten and holding the lifeless body of the baby, who he has named Trudy. William is taken to hospital, where Tom meets Dr Stelton, a psychiatrist who plans to place him in his children's home. Tom learns more about William's troubled past, including his violent alcoholic father, who had died a few years earlier, and decides to take matters into his own hands, kidnapping William from the hospital and returning him to Little Weirwold.

As William recovers, he reunites with Zach and begins to confront the trauma of what happened to him on his return to London, including gaining a better understanding of relationships and the circumstances of Trudy's birth.

William returns home one day to find Dr Stelton and three other officials waiting in the house with Tom. They inform William that his mother has committed suicide and intend to take William to Dr Stelton's children's home. Tom pleads for him to stay, arguing that William needs a loving family home rather than psychiatric treatment. After a private conversation, a Home Office official, Mr Greenway, allows Tom to adopt William.

William's happiness is cut short soon afterwards when Zach receives news that his father has been injured in a bombing raid and Zach soon departs for London. Days later, William learns that Zach has been killed in another air raid. Devastated, he withdraws emotionally, but Tom helps him process his grief by sharing his own experiences of loss. William overcomes his grief by learning to ride Zach's bicycle in his memory. He rides down a hill and proudly stops in front of Tom, who he addresses as "Dad" for the first time.

== Cast ==
- John Thaw as Tom Oakley
- Nick Robinson as William Beech
- Annabelle Apsion as Mrs Beech
- Thomas Orange as Zacharias Wrench
- William Armstrong as Dr Stelton
- Pauline Turner as Annie Hartridge
- Geoffrey Beevers as Vicar
- Mossie Smith as Mrs Fletcher
- Peter England as Michael Fletcher
- Ivan Berry as George Fletcher
- Harry Capehorn as Edward Fletcher
- Merelina Kendall as Mrs Holland
- Geoffrey Hutchings as ARP Warden Ralph
- Charles Kay as Mr Greenway
- Marlene Sidaway as Mrs Webster
- John Cater as Dr Little
- Denyse Alexander as Mrs Little
- Avril Elgar as Mrs Ford

=== Casting ===
Casting Nick Robinson as William Beech was considered a straightforward decision. He was recommended by the casting director based on his strong performances in West End theatre. He was the only actor considered for the role.

John Thaw, best known for his roles in Inspector Morse and Kavanagh QC, was announced in January 1998 as taking on the role of Tom Oakley, following a four-month break from acting. He said he was "captured by the story" when he first read the script and felt it offered a compelling character to portray. To prepare for the role, Thaw underwent a physical transformation by growing a beard for the first time in his life, over a period of two months. He looked noticeably different from his previous clean-shaven roles and surprised those who knew him well, including his wife, actress Sheila Hancock. To ensure vocal authenticity, the production brought in a dialect coach to help Thaw adopt an accent appropriate to the Suffolk region. Thaw had not worked with a child actor for many years and spent time working with Robinson prior to filming.

Annabelle Apsion, who plays William's mother, admitted feeling apprehensive about taking on the role. The character's cruel nature was a stark contrast to the more sympathetic figures Apsion was accustomed to portraying. She was initially concerned about how her performance might affect Robinson, who played her on-screen son, but noted that they developed a good rapport and she agreed to take on the role despite her reservations.

== Production ==
=== Pre-production ===
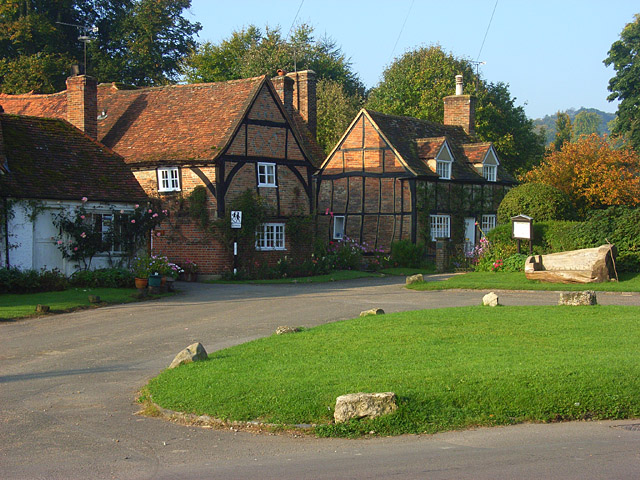
Cottages and green in Turville. Mister Tom's residence is centre

Although the story is set in Suffolk, the Buckinghamshire village of Turville was chosen as the filming location for both practical and aesthetic reasons. Its proximity to London made it economically viable, while its "untouched and rural" appearance, as noted by producer Jack Gold, closely resembled that of a pre-war English village. The church in the village matched the scale needed for scenes and was largely unchanged since before the outbreak of World War II. Turville was already familiar to television audiences, having previously featured in The Vicar of Dibley. The village of Haddenham, Buckinghamshire in the Church End area was also considered as a location.

The crew took care to ensure historical authenticity, replacing modern furnishings with 1930s-era props and furniture. The house used as Tom's residence was taken over by the crew, with the owners temporarily relocated to a hotel. The local community were highly cooperative, offering their homes for filming and even appearing as extras. Funds received by the village for hosting the production were used to help restore the church.

=== Filming ===
Filming took place during April and May 1998, though persistent rain made it challenging to create the illusion of hot summer days. Loughborough Central railway station on the preserved Great Central Railway was used to portray London, however the Severn Valley Railway station Arley portrayed Little Weirwold station. The stations have previously been used for other dramas, such as the 1993 film Shadowlands directed by Richard Attenborough(GCR) and The Chronicles Of Narnia directed by Andrew Adamson (SVR).

== Critical reception ==
Reviews on the drama were mixed. Writing for the North-West Evening Mail, James Drury found it an enjoyable period piece that "lovingly recreated" the era, although felt it leaned too heavily into sentimentality. John Boland, writing for the Irish Independent, felt the drama was unremarkable. He found the first half slow-paced and predictable, but praised John Thaw's performance as being "meticulously detailed", concluding that viewers would likely feel rewarded by the end.

In contrast, Howard Rosenberg writing for the Los Angeles Times offered a more critical perspective, arguing that the plot was overly predictable and the ending felt forced, although praised its visual appeal. Mike Davies of the Birmingham Post criticised the film as being overly sentimental and predictable, describing it as "sluggishly paced" and "visually uninspired". He found the writing and acting "underwhelming", claiming even John Thaw delivered one of his "least engaging" performances.

== Awards ==
- National Television Awards 1999: Best Drama for Goodnight Mister Tom
- BAFTA 1999: Lew Grade Award for Most Popular Television Programme of 1998 for Goodnight Mister Tom
- Television & Radio Industries Club Award 1999: Best ITV/Channel 5 Programme of 1998 for Goodnight Mister Tom
