= Sakharov (film) =

1984 television film by Jack Gold

- Written by: David W. Rintels
- Directed by: Jack Gold
- Starring: Jason Robards; Glenda Jackson; Nicol Williamson; Frank Finlay; Michael Bryant; Paul Freeman
- Music by: Carl Davis
- Countries of origin: United States; United Kingdom
- Original language: English

Production
- Producer: Robert Berger
- Cinematography: Tony Imi
- Editor: Keith Palmer
- Running time: 118 minutes
- Production companies: Titus Productions Limited; HBO Premiere Films

Original release
- Network: HBO
- Release: June 20, 1984

Sakharov is a 1984 biographical drama television film directed by Jack Gold and written by David W. Rintels. The film stars Jason Robards, Glenda Jackson, Nicol Williamson, Frank Finlay, Michael Bryant and Paul Freeman. The film premiered on HBO on June 20, 1984.

== Plot ==
The film is the story of the later life of Soviet nuclear scientist Andrei Sakharov.

In 1966, Sakharov signs the "Letter of Twenty-Five" to the 23rd Congress of the Communist Party of the Soviet Union, opposing the rehabilitation of Stalin, and this event divides his life into before and after phases. What follows is official persecution and loss of awards. He becomes a human rights activist and marries fellow campaigner Yelena Bonner. After Sakharov founds the Committee on Human Rights in the USSR, he is forced into internal exile, but is allowed by Mikhail Gorbachev to return to Moscow. He has become a notable international figure.

== Cast ==
- Jason Robards as Andrei Sakharov
- Glenda Jackson as Yelena Bonner
- Nicol Williamson as Malyarov
- Frank Finlay as Kravtsov
- Michael Bryant as Syshchikov
- Paul Freeman as Pavel Leontiev
- Anna Massey as Klavdia
- Joe Melia as Sergei Kovalev
- Lee Montague as Slavsky
- Jim Norton as Roy Medvedev
- Valentine Pelka as Efrem Sakharov
- Catherine Hall as Tanya Sakharov
- John McAndrew as Alyosha Sakharov
- Debbie Farrington as Lisa Sakharov
- David Midwinter as Matvel Sakharov, age 10
- Craig Dickerson as Matvel Sakharov, age 5
- Toni Warwick as Anya Sakharov
- Eileen Way as Ruf Grigorievna
- Denyse Alexander as Dr. Lydia
- Marion Bailey as Ludmilla Kovalov
- Anton Lesser as Valery Chalidze
