= Back Home (1989 film) =

Television film by Piers Haggard

- Genre: Drama
- Based on: Back Home by Michelle Magorian
- Written by: David Wood
- Directed by: Piers Haggard
- Starring: Hayley Mills; Hayley Carr; Brenda Bruce; Jean Anderson
- Music by: Ilona Sekacz
- Countries of origin: United Kingdom; United States
- Original language: English

Production
- Executive producers: David R. Ginsburg; Graham Benson
- Producer: J. Nigel Pickard
- Cinematography: Witold Stock
- Editor: Peter Coulson
- Running time: 105 minutes
- Production company: TVS Television

Original release
- Network: ITV (United Kingdom); Disney Channel (United States)
- Release: 23 July 1989

Back Home is a 1989 drama television film directed by Piers Haggard, based on the 1984 novel of the same name by Michelle Magorian. The film stars Hayley Mills, Hayley Carr, Brenda Bruce, and Jean Anderson. It aired on ITV in the United Kingdom on 23 July 1989 and on the Disney Channel in the United States on 7 June 1990.

== Plot ==
Virginia 'Rusty' Dickinson (Hayley Carr) left England during World War II, and comes back home in 1945. During the war she lived in a foster family and in this way absorbed American culture.

She discovers that her family's situation is very different than it was before the war. She meets her mother, Peggy Dickinson (Hayley Mills), and her new five-year-old brother, Charlie. As Rusty returns, her father, Roger Dickinson (Rupert Frazer), is still stationed as a soldier in Burma. When Japan surrenders he comes back home. His old-fashioned behavior and nature make him unhappy with his modern self-sufficient wife, his Americanised daughter and especially Charlie's dislike of his "new" father.

Rusty is sent to boarding school. As she is used to an American school, she finds the teachers and the other pupils very strict. The school's atmosphere makes her suffer and the other pupils mock her for being an American.

== Cast ==
- Hayley Mills as Mrs. Peggy Dickinson
- Hayley Carr as Virginia "Rusty" Dickinson
- Adam Stevenson as Charles "Charlie" Dickinson
- Brenda Bruce as The Honourable Lady Beatrice "Beattie" Langley
- Jean Anderson as Grandmother Dickinson
- Rupert Frazer as Mr. Roger Dickinson
- Mary Ellen Ray as Aunt Hannah
- Tracy Johns as School Child
