= Mark Waters =

American film director (born 1964)

- Born: Mark Stephen Waters; June 30, 1964 (age 62); Wyandotte, Michigan, U.S.
- Education: AFI Conservatory
- Occupations: Director; producer
- Years active: 1994–present
- Notable work: Freaky Friday; Mean Girls; Ghosts of Girlfriends Past; Mr. Popper's Penguins; Vampire Academy
- Spouse: Dina Spybey (m. 2000)
- Children: 2
- Relatives: Daniel Waters (brother)

Mark Stephen Waters (born June 30, 1964) is an American director.

== Early life ==
Waters was raised in South Bend, Indiana. He studied at the University of Pennsylvania in theatre arts before studying at the American Film Institute. When studying at Penn, he saw The House of Yes and saw things in the play that he felt he could make cinematic. He contacted the author of the play, Wendy MacLeod, and got a manuscript copy by saying he was a film producer. He worked as a stage actor and director in Philadelphia and San Francisco before his work with AFI, where he graduated in 1994. He made a number of short films.

== Career ==
Waters began his filmmaking career following his graduation from the American Film Institute in 1994. He made his feature directorial debut with the independent dark comedy The House of Yes (1997), an adaptation of Wendy MacLeod's play of the same name. Starring Parker Posey, the film premiered at the Sundance Film Festival and garnered critical recognition. Following this, he directed the romantic comedy Head Over Heels (2001) and the television film Warning: Parental Advisory (2002).

Waters achieved significant commercial success directing mainstream studio comedies. He directed the Walt Disney Pictures remake Freaky Friday (2003), starring Jamie Lee Curtis and Lindsay Lohan, which was a major box-office hit. He reunited with Lohan for the hit teen comedy Mean Girls (2004), written by Tina Fey, which became highly influential in popular culture. Continuing his work in the genre, Waters directed the romantic comedy Just Like Heaven (2005) and the family fantasy adventure The Spiderwick Chronicles (2008).

In the late 2000s and 2010s, Waters continued to helm a variety of features, including the romantic comedy Ghosts of Girlfriends Past (2009), the family comedy Mr. Popper's Penguins (2011) starring Jim Carrey, and the fantasy adaptation Vampire Academy (2014). He also directed the dark comedy sequel Bad Santa 2 (2016), the Disney+ family film Magic Camp (2020), and the teen romantic comedy He's All That (2021).

Additionally, Waters was previously attached to direct the feature film Minimum Wage, written by Scott Atkinson and Tegan West. Beyond directing, he has also worked as a producer on films such as (500) Days of Summer (2009).

== Filmography ==
=== Film ===
Year	Title	Director	Executive Producer
1997	The House of Yes (Note: Also credited as writer)	Yes	No
2001	Head over Heels	Yes	No
2003	Freaky Friday	Yes	No
2004	Mean Girls	Yes	No
2005	Sorry, Haters	No	Yes
2005	Just Like Heaven	Yes	No
2008	The Spiderwick Chronicles	Yes	No
2009	Ghosts of Girlfriends Past	Yes	Yes
2011	Mr. Popper's Penguins	Yes	Yes
2014	Vampire Academy	Yes	No
2016	Bad Santa 2	Yes	Yes
2020	Magic Camp	Yes	No
2021	He's All That	Yes	No
2024	Mother of the Bride	Yes	No
2025	La Dolce Villa	Yes	No
2026	Hershey	Yes	No
2027	Return to You	Yes	No
TBA	Harvest Moon	Yes	No

Producer

- 500 Days of Summer (2009)
- Harvest Moon (TBA)

=== Television ===
TV movies

Year	Title	Director	Executive Producer
2002	Warning: Parental Advisory	Yes	No
2009	Eva Adams	Yes	Yes
2015	Salem Rogers	Yes	No
2015	Cheerleader Death Squad	Yes	No
2018	#'Fashionvictim	Yes	Yes

TV series

Year	Title	Director	Executive producer	Notes
2012	Made in Jersey	Yes	Yes	2 episodes
2013	Witches of East End	Yes	Yes	1 episode
2019	Looking for Alaska	No	Yes	Miniseries
