= Jack Gold =

British film and television director (1930–2015)

- Born: Jacob Michael Gold; 28 June 1930; London, England
- Died: 9 August 2015 (aged 85); London, England
- Occupation: Director
- Spouse: Denyse Alexander (m. 1957)
- Children: 3, including Nick

Jacob Michael Gold (28 June 1930 – 9 August 2015) was a British film and television director. He was part of the British realist tradition which followed the Free Cinema movement.

== Career ==
Jacob Michael Gold was born on 28 June 1930, in North London, the son of Charles and Minnie (née Elbery) Gold.

He studied Economics and Law at University College London. After leaving UCL, he began his career as a film editor on the BBC's Tonight programme. Gold became a freelance documentary filmmaker, making dramas as a platform for his social and political observations.

For television, his best known work is The Naked Civil Servant (1975), based on Quentin Crisp's 1968 book of the same name and starring John Hurt, which won the Grand Prize at the San Remo Film Festival. He had previously directed the 1964 crime series Call the Gun Expert for the BBC.

Other television credits include The Visit (1959), the BBC Television Shakespeare productions of The Merchant of Venice (1980) and Macbeth (1983) - the latter starring Nicol Williamson - as well as the made-for-TV adaptation of Graham Greene's The Tenth Man (1988), starring Anthony Hopkins and Charlie Muffin (1979, USA: A Deadly Game). In 1998, he directed an award-winning-adaption of the 1981 children's book Goodnight Mister Tom by Michelle Magorian, featuring John Thaw in the lead. He also directed films such as The National Health (1973), Man Friday (1975), Aces High (1976), The Medusa Touch (1978), The Chain (1985) and Escape from Sobibor (1987).

Gold directed the final episode of ITV's television detective drama Inspector Morse. Other work includes the television drama series Kavanagh QC and The Brief.

Gold was an Honorary Associate of London Film School.

== Personal life ==
Gold married actress Denyse Alexander (née Macpherson) in 1957, with whom he shared a birthday - she was born in 1931. The couple had three children: Jamie, Kathryn and music producer Nick Gold.

== Filmography ==
- Living Jazz (1961)
- My Father Knew Lloyd George (1965)
- Famine (1967)
- The World of Coppard (1968)
- The Bofors Gun (1968)
- The Reckoning (1969)
- Stoker Leishman's Diaries (1972)
- The Gangster Show: The Resistible Rise of Arturo Ui (1972)
- Conflict (1973; also released as Catholics)
- The National Health (1973)
- Who? (1974)
- Man Friday (1975)
- The Naked Civil Servant (1975)
- Aces High (1976)
- Thank You, Comrades (1978)
- The Medusa Touch (1978)
- The Sailor's Return (1978)
- Charlie Muffin (1979)
- Little Lord Fauntleroy (1980)
- The Merchant of Venice (1980)
- Praying Mantis (1983)
- Macbeth (1983)
- Good and Bad at Games (1983)
- Red Monarch (1983)
- The Chain (1984)
- Sakharov (1984)
- Me and the Girls (1985)
- Murrow (1986)
- Escape from Sobibor (1987)
- Stones for Ibarra (1988)
- The Tenth Man (1988)
- Ball Trap on the Cote Sauvage (1989)
- The Rose and the Jackal (1990)
- The War That Never Ends (1991)
- She Stood Alone (1991)
- The Lucona Affair (1993)
- Spring Awakening (1994)
- The Return of the Native (1994)
- Heavy Weather (1995)
- Into the Blue (1997)
- Goodnight Mister Tom (1998)

== Other sources ==
- Aitken, Ian (ed.). Encyclopedia of the Documentary Film. New York: Routledge, 2005. ISBN 978-1-57958-445-0.
