= Victor Spinetti =

Welsh actor (1929–2012)

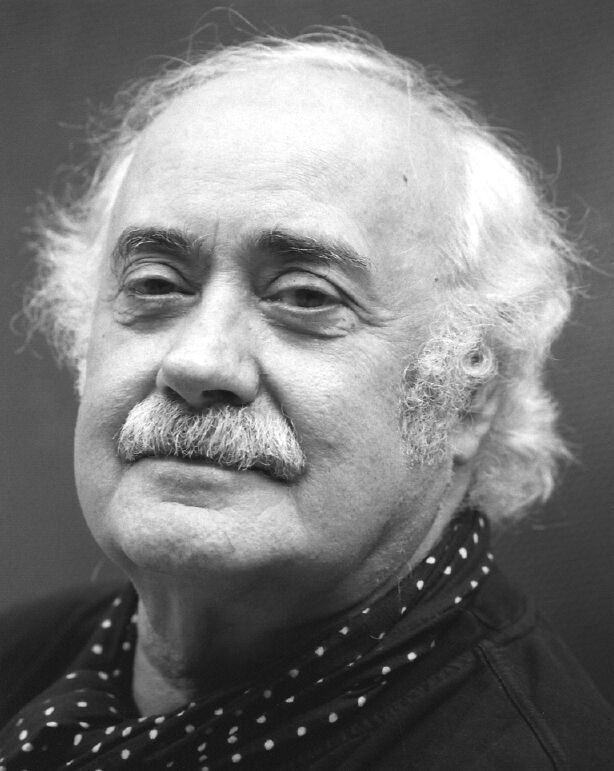
- Born: Vittorio Giorgio Andre Spinetti; 2 September 1929; Cwm, Wales
- Died: 19 June 2012 (aged 82); Monmouth, Wales
- Education: Royal Welsh College of Music & Drama
- Occupations: Actor, author, poet, raconteur
- Years active: 1961–2012
- Partner: Graham Curnow (1953–1997; Curnow's death)
- Relatives: Henry Spinetti (brother)

Vittorio Giorgio Andre "Victor" Spinetti (2 September 1929 – 19 June 2012) was a Welsh actor, author, poet and raconteur. He appeared in dozens of films and stage plays throughout his fifty-year career, including the three 1960s Beatles films A Hard Day's Night, Help! and Magical Mystery Tour.

Born in Cwm, Spinetti was educated at Monmouth School and the Royal Welsh College of Music & Drama in Cardiff, of which he became a Fellow. After various menial jobs, Spinetti pursued a stage career and was closely associated with Joan Littlewood's Theatre Workshop. Among the productions were Fings Ain't Wot They Used T'Be and Oh, What a Lovely War! (1963), which transferred to Broadway and for which he won a Tony Award. Spinetti's film career developed simultaneously; his dozens of film appearances included Zeffirelli's The Taming of the Shrew, Under Milk Wood, The Return of the Pink Panther and Under the Cherry Moon.

During his later career, Spinetti acted with the Royal Shakespeare Company in such roles as Lord Foppington in The Relapse and the Archbishop in Richard III at Stratford-upon-Avon; and, in 1990, he appeared in The Krays. At age 70+, Victor remained active under the theatre lights playing Baron Bomburst in the musical version of Chitty Chitty Bang Bang in 2003 and Baron Zeta in the operetta The Merry Widow in 2004. In 2008 he appeared in a one-man show, A Very Private Diary, which toured the UK as A Very Private Diary ... Revisited!, recounting his life story. Spinetti was diagnosed with prostate cancer in 2011 and died of the disease in June 2012.

== Early life ==
Vittorio Giorgio Andre Spinetti was born on 2 September 1929 in Cwm, Monmouthshire, of Welsh and Italian descent from a grandfather who was said to have walked from Italy to Wales to work as a coal miner, just to earn enough money to buy a plough. His parents, Giuseppe and Lily (née Watson), owned the chip shop in Cwm, over which premises the family lived and where Spinetti was born. Spinetti was the eldest of six, and his youngest brother, Henry (born 1951), is a session drummer. Spinetti was educated at Monmouth School and the Royal Welsh College of Music & Drama in Cardiff, of which he later became a Fellow. It was at the college that Spinetti met actor Graham Curnow, who became his life partner.

== Career ==
Before finding roles in acting, Spinetti worked as a waiter and factory worker. He recalled singing in London pubs in the 50s, and working as a paint sprayer to afford his rent.

Spinetti started at Dhurjati Chaudhury's Irving Theatre Club on Irving Street, off Leicester Square, London.

=== Film ===
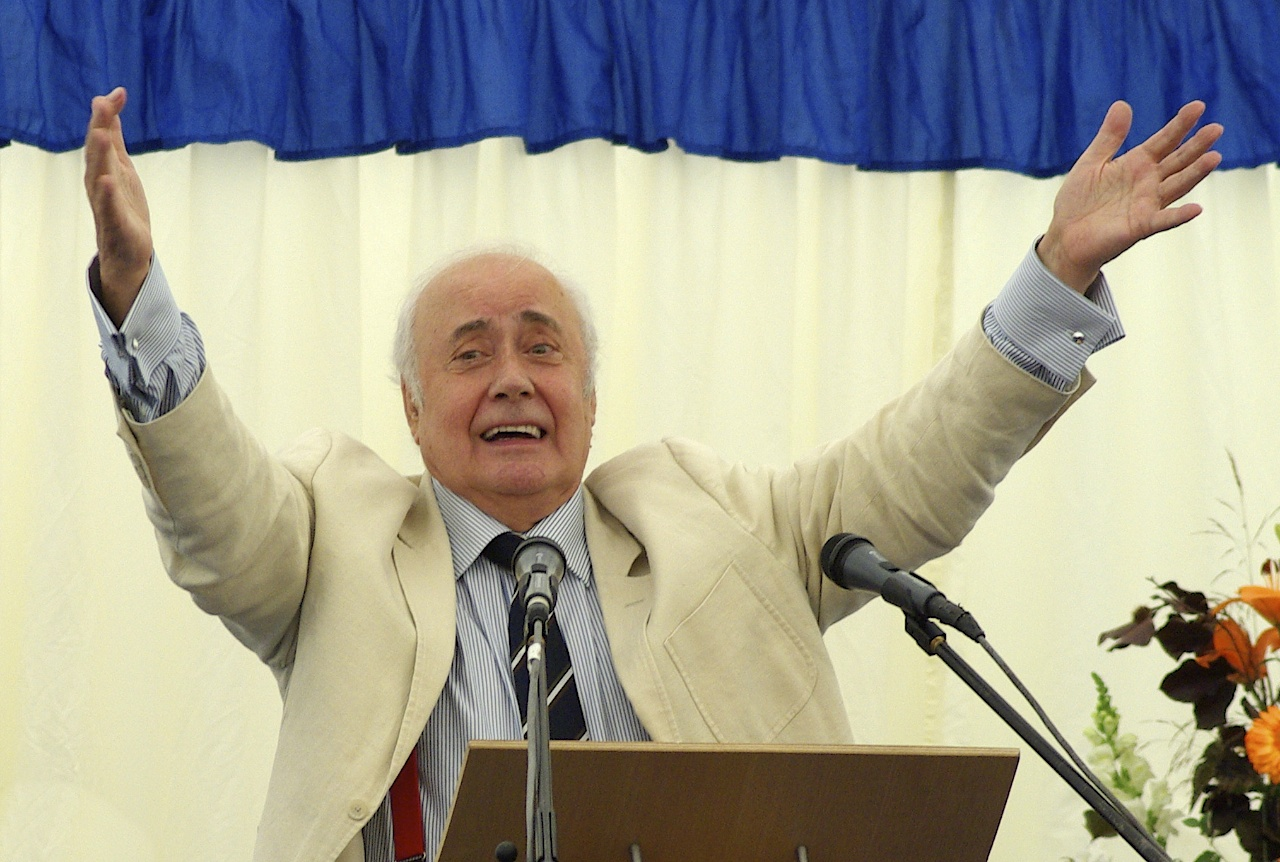
At Monmouth School on speech day, 2009

Spinetti gained international fame during the 1960s due to his association with the Beatles. He appeared in the first three Beatles films: A Hard Day's Night (1964), Help! (1965), and Magical Mystery Tour (1967). He also appeared on the Beatles' 1967 Christmas recording, released to members of their fan club. The best explanation for this long-running collaboration and friendship might have been provided by George Harrison, who told Spinetti, "You've got to be in all our films ... if you're not in them me Mum won't come and see them – because she fancies you." But Harrison also later told him, "You've got a lovely karma, Vic." Paul McCartney once described Spinetti as "the man who makes clouds disappear". Spinetti made a small appearance in the promotional video for Wings' song "London Town" from the 1978 album of the same name. Spinetti's July 2010 performance of the song "Ob-La-Di, Ob-La-Da", at the Festival Theatre, Malvern in Worcestershire, was available on "The Beatles Complete on Ukulele" podcast.

Spinetti appeared in around 30 films, including The Gentle Terror (1961), Sparrows Can't Sing (1963), The Wild Affair (1964), Becket (1964), Zeffirelli's The Taming of the Shrew (1967), The Biggest Bundle of Them All (1968), Can Heironymus Merkin Ever Forget Mercy Humppe and Find True Happiness? (1969), This, That and the Other (1969), Start the Revolution Without Me (1970), Under Milk Wood (1971), Digby, the Biggest Dog in the World (1973), The Great McGonagall (1974), The Little Prince (1974), The Return of the Pink Panther (1975), Voyage of the Damned (1976), Emily (1976), Hardcore (1977), Casanova & Co. (1977), Under the Cherry Moon (1986) and The Krays (1990).

Spinetti's last on-screen appearance was in the DVD release of the independent film Beatles Stories by American musician Seth Swirsky, issued to celebrate the 50th anniversary of the Beatles' first recording sessions at Abbey Road.

=== Theatre ===
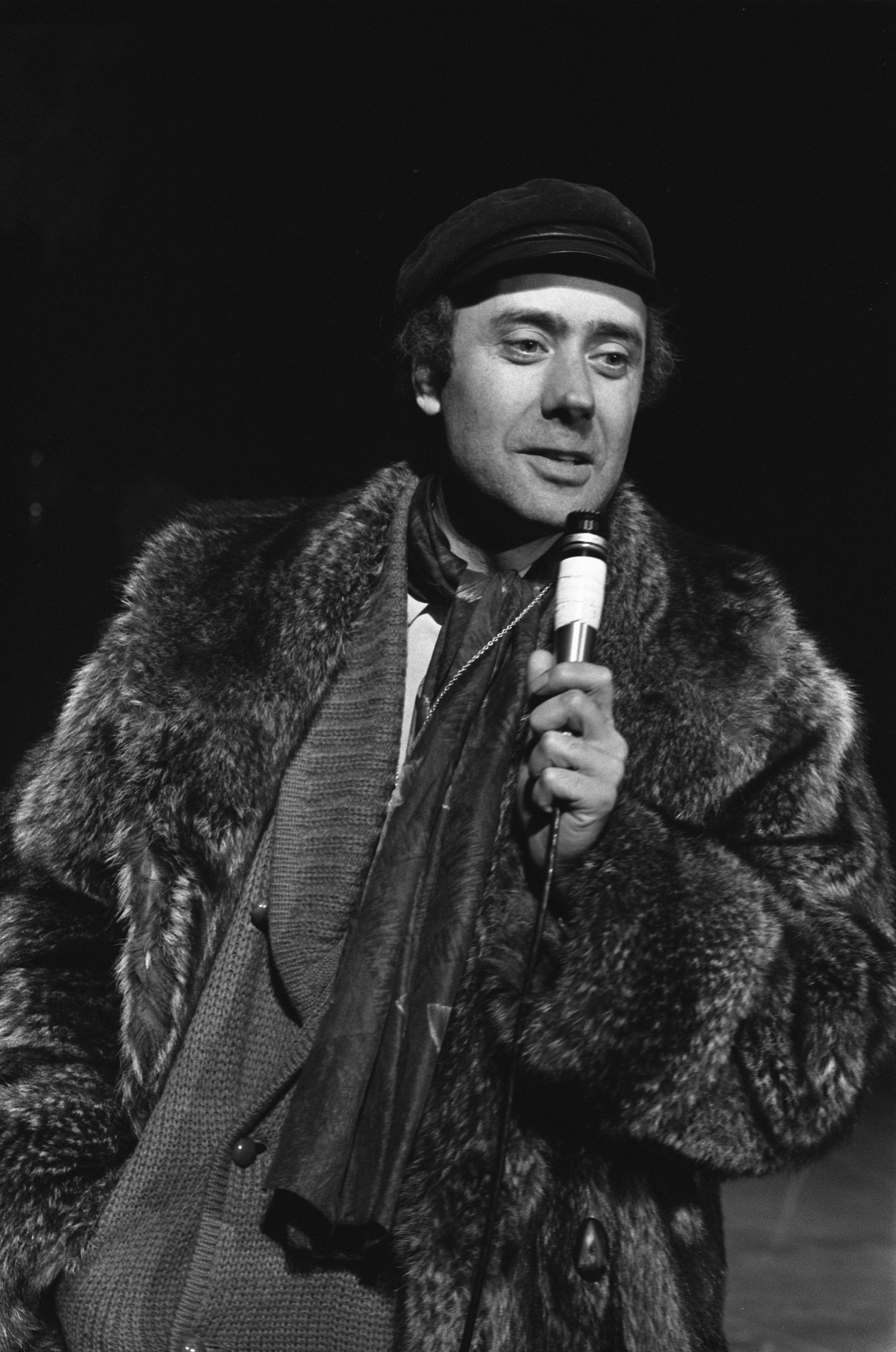
Spinetti directing the premiere of Hair in Amsterdam, 1969

Spinetti's work in Joan Littlewood's Theatre Workshop produced many memorable performances including Fings Ain't Wot They Used T'Be (1959, by Frank Norman, with music by Lionel Bart), and Oh, What a Lovely War! (1963), which transferred to New York City and for which he won a Tony Award for his main role as an obnoxious Drill Sergeant. He appeared in the West End in The Odd Couple (as Felix); in Chitty Chitty Bang Bang in the West End; and as Albert Einstein in a critically lauded performance in 2005 in a new play, Albert's Boy at the Finborough Theatre. He launched his own one-man show of witty reminiscences, A Very Private Diary, at the Edinburgh Festival Fringe.

One of Spinetti's most challenging theatre roles was as the principal male character in Jane Arden's radical feminist play Vagina Rex and the Gas Oven, which played to packed houses for six weeks at the Arts Lab on Drury Lane in 1969. In 1980, he directed The Biograph Girl, a musical about the silent film era, at the Phoenix Theatre. In 1986, he appeared as Fagin in the musical Oliver!, which was the last professional production to use Sean Kenny's original stage design. He appeared on Broadway in The Hostage and The Philanthropist, and also acted in 1995 with the Royal Shakespeare Company, in such roles as Lord Foppington in The Relapse and the Archbishop in Richard III, at Stratford-upon-Avon, although this was not a happy experience for him.

Spinetti co-authored In His Own Write, the play adapted from a book by John Lennon with the Beatle which he also directed at the National Theatre, premiering on 18 June 1968, at the Old Vic. Spinetti and Lennon appeared together in June 1968 on BBC2's Release. During the interview, Spinetti said of the play, that "it's not really John's childhood, it's all of ours really, isn't it John?" to which Lennon replied, assuming a camp voice, "It is, we're all one Victor, we're all one aren't we. I mean 'what's going on?'" Spinetti described the play as being "about the growing up of any of us; the things that helped us to be more aware".

He also directed Jesus Christ Superstar and Hair, including productions staged in Europe. His many television appearances on British TV, include Take My Wife in which he played a London-based booking agent and schemer who was forever promising his comedian client that fame was just around the corner, and the sitcom An Actor's Life For Me.

In 1999 Victor Spinetti played in a Jim Davidson Adult Pantomime of Babes in the Wood (Boobs in the Wood) as Friar Tuck, who had been taking weed. He had been told by The Sheriff of Nottingham (Jim Davidson) to kill his niece and nephew, who were escaped convicts (one of them played by Kenny Baker).

In September 2008 Spinetti reprised his one-man show, A Very Private Diary, touring the UK, as A Very Private Diary ... Revisited!, telling his life story.

=== Television ===
From 1968 to 1969, Spinetti was a cast member of the Marty Feldman sketch show It's Marty, which was written by Barry Took, with contributions by John Cleese, Michael Palin and Graham Chapman, members of Monty Python as well as John Junkin, who appeared with Spinetti in A Hard Day's Night. In 1969 and 1970, Spinetti appeared on Thames Television, alongside Sid James, as one half of Two in Clover over two series. A sitcom about two office workers who jack it all in to become farmers, he starred in all but one of the 13 episodes. His absence in episode No. 3 of the second series was covered by fellow Welsh actor Richard Davies, playing Spinetti's character's brother.

In the 1970s, Spinetti appeared in a series of television advertisements for McVities' (now United Biscuits) Jaffa Cakes, as "The Mad Jaffa Cake Eater", a turbaned, Middle-Eastern style character who rode a bicycle and surreptitiously stole and ate other people's Jaffa Cakes, prompting the catchphrase "There's Orangey!" He hosted Victor's Party for Granada. In 1979, he voiced Mr. Tumnus in the USA dubbed version of the 1979 animated adaptation of The Lion, the Witch and the Wardrobe as well as voice directing for the film. (Spinetti was also the voice of Shift the ape in the Focus on the Family Radio Theatre adaptation of The Last Battle.) Later he voiced arch villain Texas Pete in the popular S4C animated TV series SuperTed (1982–84) and narrated several Fireman Sam audiobooks. In 1988 he appeared alongside Paul Scofield and Mary Steenburgen in The Attic, a World War Two drama about Anne Frank. In 1992, he voiced the King of the Rats in the British children's animated programme Tales of the Tooth Fairies (in the episode The Stolen Present) on BBC, produced by Welsh animation company Calon, formerly Siriol Productions. In 1995, he appeared in the "Finger" episode of the comedy series Bottom, with Rik Mayall and Ade Edmondson, as Audrey the Maître d'hôtel. He also starred in the 1999 DVD film Boobs in the Wood with Jim Davidson.

From 2000 to 2002, Spinetti played Max, the 'man of a thousand faces', in the children's TV programme Harry and the Wrinklies, which also starred Nick Robinson in the title role.

=== Appearances ===
- Spinetti appears in This Is Your Life.
- 1985: The "All I Need Is a Miracle" music video by Mike and the Mechanics as the club owner.

=== Writing ===
Spinetti's poetry, notably Watchers Along the Mall (1963), and prose appeared in various publications. His memoir, Victor Spinetti Up Front...: His Strictly Confidential Autobiography, published in September 2006, is filled with anecdotes and personal insights into life with the Beatles as well as previously unpublished photos of the Fab Four. In conversation with BBC Radio 2's Michael Ball, on his show broadcast on 7 September 2008, Spinetti revealed that Princess Margaret had been instrumental in securing the necessary censor permission for the first run of Oh, What A Lovely War!.

== Personal life ==
Spinetti lived in Brighton with his partner of 44 years, Graham Curnow. They were openly non-monogamous, and Spinetti openly talked about other sexual encounters in his memoir. Curnow appeared in the 1959 British horror film Horrors of the Black Museum. Curnow became seriously ill towards the end of his life, and Spinetti sold most of his Beatles memorabilia to ensure Curnow was comfortable. Curnow died in 1997.

== Death ==
Spinetti had been diagnosed with prostate cancer in February 2011 after collapsing onstage on Valentine's Day. He suffered a spinal fracture and discovered only by chance that he had a tumour. He was at first treated in London, but after being cared for by his sister and brother-in-law he moved to the Velindre Cancer Centre in Whitchurch, Cardiff for radiotherapy. He died from the disease at Monnow Vale Integrated Health and Social Care Facility in Monmouth on the morning of 19 June 2012. His funeral was conducted by Ajahn Khemadhammo.

== Tributes ==
Spinetti was visited shortly before his death by Barbara Windsor, who had co-starred with him in the West End production of Oh, What a Lovely War! Windsor said, "We were very close. He was another of my great friends from that era. He was such a great man. He was such a good actor because he took notice of people and used their characters. He portrayed them wonderfully, whatever he did." Comedian Rob Brydon tweeted, "So sad Victor Spinetti has died. The funniest story teller I've ever met and a lovely warm man." Spinetti also received warm tributes from actor and singer Britt Ekland and fellow Welsh actor Siân Phillips, who told BBC Wales that she was shocked and saddened. Phillips added, "He was such a force of joy and vitality. When one saw him across a crowded room, one couldn't wait to get together with him and have a chat and a catch-up."

Paul McCartney paid tribute to Spinetti on his website: "Victor was a fine man, a great pal and a fantastic actor and someone I am proud to have known for many years. His irreverent wit and exuberant personality will remain in my memory forever. I will miss his loyal friendship as will all the others who were lucky enough to know and love the wonderful Mr Spinetti." At a memorial service for Spinetti, attended by McCartney, the Beatles song "In My Life" was sung by Michael Ball. Preston FM scheduled a tribute broadcast, for 22 June, of a previously unaired in-depth interview with Spinetti, recorded when he visited Blackpool in July 2010, in Paul and Lucy Breeze's Best Kept Secrets in Conversation.

== Filmography ==
=== Film ===
Year	Title	Role	Notes
1958	Behind the Mask	Minor Role	Uncredited
1961	The Gentle Terror	Joe	
1963	Sparrows Can't Sing	Arnold	
1963	Stolen Hours	Freddy Cadogan - Party Guest	Uncredited
1964	Becket	French Tailor	Uncredited
1964	A Hard Day's Night	T.V. Director	
1964	I Think They Call Him John	Co-Narrator (with Bessie Love)	
1965	Help!	Foot	
1965	The Wild Affair	Quentin	
1967	The Taming of the Shrew	Hortensio	
1967	Magical Mystery Tour	Army Sergeant	
1968	The Biggest Bundle of Them All	Captain Giglio	
1969	Can Heironymus Merkin Ever Forget Mercy Humppe and Find True Happiness?	Critic Sharpnose	
1970	Start the Revolution Without Me	Duke d'Escargot	
1970	A Promise of Bed	George	
1970	Defeat of the Mafia	Charles Agostino	
1971	Under Milk Wood	Mog Edwards	
1973	Digby, the Biggest Dog in the World	Professor Ribart	
1974	The Little Prince	The Historian	
1975	The Great McGonagall	Mr. Stewart / Second-Lieutenant Rotlo / Supposed John Brown / Gentleman / Revolutionary / Cardinal / Policeman	
1975	The Return of the Pink Panther	Hotel Concierge	
1975	Dick Deadeye, or Duty Done	Dick Deadeye	Voice
1976	Emily	Richard Walker	
1976	Voyage of the Damned	Dr. Erich Strauss	
1977	Casanova & Co.	The Prefect	
1977	Hardcore	Duncan	
1986	Under the Cherry Moon	The Jaded Three No. 1	
1990	The Krays	Mr. Lawson	
1990	Romeo.Juliet	Tybalt / Benvolio	Voice
1991	The Princess and the Goblin	Glump	Voice
1999	Julie and the Cadillacs	Cyril Wise	
1999	Dragon Tales	Narrator (Audiobooks)	

=== Television ===
Year	Title	Role	Notes
1963	The Saint	Commisionaire	Episode: "The Romantic Matron"
1963	Richard the Lionheart	Pierre	Episode: "The Heir of England"
1964	Zero One	Roberto	Episode: "A Case of Charity"
1966	Thirty-Minute Theatre	George	Story: "Not for Just an Hour"
1969	Opening Night	General Irrigua	Story: "Cat Among the Pigeons!"
1969- 1970	Two in Clover	Vic Evans	12 episodes
1973	Harriet's Back in Town	Aubrey Stokes	2 episodes
1975	Whodunnit?	Randel	Episode: "Worth Dying For"
1979	The Lion, Witch and the Wardrobe	Mr. Tumms	TV Movie
1979	Take My Wife	Maurice Watkins	6 episodes
1978	BBC Play of the Month	Hatch	Story: "The Sea"
1980	Time of My Life	Vittorio	1 episode
1983	Sweet Sixteen	Ken Green	3 episodes
1983	BBC Play of the Month	Trivelin	Story: "Infidelities"
1983- 1986	SuperTed	Texas Pete (voice)	35 episodes
1984	Danger: Maramalade at Work	Chef Robbo	Episode: "Marmalade and Chef Robbo"
1984	Mistral's Daughter	Bianchi	3 episodes
1986	Emu's All Live Pink Windmill Show	Captain Squint	4 episodes
1986	Sins	Susumu	1 episode
1988	The Attic: The Hiding of Anne Frank	Herman Van Dann	TV Movie
1988	Bad Boys	Inspector Oiseau	2 episodes
1989	The Further Adventures of SuperTed	Texas Pete (voice)	6 episodes
1989	The Paradise Club	Elliot Rossini	Episode: "Family Favours"
1990	Omnibus	Dr. Gachet	Episode: "Van Gogh"
1991	An Actor's Life For Me	Desmond Shaw	6 episodes
1991	Paul Merton: The Series	Soldier	1 episode
1991	Singles	Louis	Episode: "From Russia with Love"
1992	Secrets	Sigmund Vandenhoff	2 episodes
1992	Take Off with T-Bag	Darren Katz	Episode: "The Red Shoes"
1992	Tales of the Tooth Fairies	The King of the Rats (voice)	Episode: "The Present"
1995	The Adventures of Young Indiana Jones: Attack of the Hawkmen	Bragas/ Major D.	TV Movie
1995	Bottom	Maitre'd	Episode: "Finger"
2000	In the Beginning	Happetezoah/ Pharoah's Magician	2 episodes
2000- 2002	Harry and the Wrinklies	Max	13 episodes
2002	First Degree	Founder	9 episodes
2005	High Hopes	Daniel Gold	Episode: "Every Picture Tells A Story"
2005	New Tricks	Binky	Episodes: "Old and Cold"
