= Magorian =

Magorian may refer to:

- Michelle Magorian (born 1947), a British author of children's books
- Magorian, a centaur magical creature in Harry Potter
- Magorian, venerated as a saint, brother of Vigilius of Trent
