= Briony McRoberts =

English actress (1957–2013)

- Born: 10 February 1957; Welwyn Garden City, Hertfordshire, England
- Died: 17 July 2013 (aged 56); Fulham, London, England
- Occupation: Actress
- Years active: 1970–2005
- Spouse: David Robb (m. 1978)

Briony McRoberts (10 February 1957 – 17 July 2013) was an English actress.

== Career ==
On television, she played Tessa Kilpin in "No Stone", the 57th episode of The Professionals, and appeared in television programmes including The Bill, EastEnders, Taggart, The Crezz and Diamonds. In 1976, she played Wendy Darling in a musical adaptation of J. M. Barrie's Peter Pan starring Mia Farrow and Danny Kaye on NBC's Hallmark Hall of Fame. In film, she played Margo Fassbender in The Pink Panther Strikes Again (1976) and Ann Underwood in the horror film Edge of Sanity (1989).

She had a regular role as Lady Laird Sam Hagan in the Scottish soap Take the High Road for STV from 1992 to 1998. From 2000 until 2002 played Lavinia "Gestapo Lil" McScrew on Harry and the Wrinklies.

On stage, she made many appearances in the West End and the regions including playing Wendy Darling in J.M. Barrie's Peter Pan at the Shaftesbury Theatre in 1980, the musical 'Maggie', also at the Shaftesbury Theatre in 1978 and Charley's Aunt at the Aldwych Theatre in 1983.

== Activism ==
McRoberts had been an active supporter of Scottish Friends of the Earth's Fight the Fumes campaign.

== Personal life ==
She was married to actor David Robb.

== Death ==
McRoberts died on 17 July 2013 at Fulham Broadway tube station, West London, after being hit by a District line train. British Transport Police said a file had been sent to the coroner and at the time her death was not being treated as suspicious. McRoberts' agent said that she believed the actress had taken her own life. At an inquest held in Fulham in October 2013 coroner Elizabeth Pygot returned a verdict of suicide and said: "A pathologist and toxicology results found that she had no alcohol, drugs or medication in her system when she died. She had a longstanding battle with anorexia and severe depression and found it difficult to accept medication. Considering the evidence provided I can conclude beyond reasonable doubt that the deceased took her own life. She jumped in front of the tube train and clearly knew what she was doing. She was extremely unhappy and intended to bring her life to an end."

== Filmography ==
Year	Title	Role	Notes
1971-1972	Bachelor Father	Anna	19 episodes
1976	The Pink Panther Strikes Again	Margo Fassbender	Cinematic release
1976	Peter Pan	Wendy Darling	British-American made-for-television musical film adaptation
1981	Diamonds	Elaine Coleman	7 episodes
1982	Sink or Swim	Charlotte	4 episodes
1983	The Professionals	Tessa Kilpin	Episode 'No Stone'
1985-1986	Mr. Palfrey of Westminster	Caroline, Palfrey's secretary	10 episodes
1989	Edge of Sanity	Ann Underwood	Cinematic release
1992-2000	Take the High Road	Sam Hagan	49 episodes
2000	Doctors	Louise	Episode: "Confidential Information"
2000	Taggart	Glena Bennett	S17.E2, Skin Deep
2000-2002	Harry and the Wrinklies	Lavinia "Gestapo Lil" McScrew	
2002	Heartbeat	Mrs. Foxton	S12.E6, No Man's Land
2005	The Bill	Maureen Rayner	S21.E10 The Suttle Approach
