= Artemis 81 =

Television film

- DVD cover
- Written by: David Rudkin
- Directed by: Alastair Reid
- Starring: Hywel Bennett; Sting; Roland Curram
- Country of origin: United Kingdom
- Original language: English

Original release
- Network: BBC
- Release: 29 December 1981

Artemis 81 is a British television play which was written by David Rudkin and directed by Alastair Reid. Commissioned by BBC producer David Rose, it was broadcast by the BBC on 29 December 1981. It was one of the last TV performances from Anthony Steel.

== Plot summary ==
Occult novelist Gideon Harlax (Hywel Bennett) is drawn into an epic battle between Helith (Sting), the Angel of Light, and Asrael (Roland Curram), the Angel of Death.

== Selected cast ==
- Hywel Bennett - Gideon Harlax
- Dinah Stabb - Gwen Meredith
- Dan O'Herlihy - Albrecht Von Drachenfels
- Sting - Helith
- Roland Curram - Asrael
- Anthony Steel - Tristram Guise
- Margaret Whiting - Laura Guise
- Ian Redford - Jed Thaxter
- Mary Ellen Ray - Sonia
- Cornelius Garrett - Pastor
- Ingrid Pitt - Hitchcock Blonde
- Daniel Day-Lewis - Library Student
- Sylvia Coleridge - Library Scholar

== DVD release ==
Artemis 81 was released on DVD in 2007. It was incorrectly issued as Artemis '81. The 81 is the number of a star, not a date. The DVD also removes 94 seconds of material due to licensing issues around the use of stills from Alfred Hitchcock films during the scene in Jed Thaxter's office.

== See also ==
- Manichaeism
