= Edge of Sanity (film) =

1989 British-American film directed by Gérard Kikoïne

- Film poster
- Directed by: Gérard Kikoïne
- Written by: J.P. Félix; Ron Raley
- Based on: Strange Case of Dr Jekyll and Mr Hyde; Jack the Ripper
- Produced by: Jacques Fiorentino; Harry Alan Towers
- Starring: Anthony Perkins; Glynis Barber; David Lodge
- Cinematography: Tony Spratling
- Edited by: Malcolm Cooke
- Music by: Frédéric Talgorn
- Production company: Allied Vision
- Distributed by: Millimeter Films
- Release date: 14 April 1989
- Running time: 85 minutes
- Countries: France; United Kingdom; United States
- Language: English
- Box office: $102,219

Edge of Sanity is a 1989 slasher film directed by Gérard Kikoïne and starring Anthony Perkins. It mixes elements of Robert Louis Stevenson's 1886 novella Strange Case of Dr Jekyll and Mr Hyde with those of the Jack the Ripper case.

== Plot ==
In the opening scene, Henry Jekyll, a young boy, witnesses his father having sex with a prostitute in a barn. His father catches him and violently whips Henry for spying, scarring him for life and leading to repressed sadomasochistic longings. Many years later, in late 1880s England, the adult Dr. Henry Jekyll is experimenting with the human psyche when he accidentally ingests a mix of ether and cocaine and goes insane. He transforms into the monstrous-looking Jack "the Ripper" Hyde and murders a prostitute who resembles one that he previously met as a child. He begins a killing spree using the mixture that was originally meant to be an anesthetic in order to influence prostitutes and johns to torture and kill each other. The murders gain the attention of a detective from Scotland Yard as well as Jekyll's wife Elisabeth, who begins to suspect where her husband is going at night.

One night, after he transforms, Jekyll is followed by Elisabeth to a brothel and then from there to a sadomasochistic threesome at a local abandoned warehouse where both of Hyde's partners go crazy and attempt to kill each other and her. Elisabeth manages to get away, but Hyde follows her back to her house. He breaks in and murders her before transforming back into Dr. Jekyll, thus getting away with everything and enabling him to continue his killing spree.

== Cast ==
- Anthony Perkins as Dr. Henry Jekyll / Jack "the Ripper" Hyde
- Glynis Barber as Elisabeth Jekyll
- Sarah Maur Thorp as Susannah
- David Lodge as Underwood
- Ben Cole as Johnny
- Jill Melford as Flora
- Noel Coleman as Egglestone
- Briony McRoberts as Ann Underwood
- Harry Landis as Coroner
- Basil Hoskins as Mr. Bottingham

== Production ==
The film was mostly shot in Budapest, with a few exterior sets being filmed in London. Vincent Canby stated that he thinks the film looks "19th-century atmospheric". While the film is for the most part clearly set in the Victorian era, some of the wardrobe seems deliberately anachronistic and modern, adding to the film's surrealistic ambience.

Alain Silver compared the style of the film to those directed by Ken Russell, based on the way that the films incorporate the supernatural, psychology, and sexual imagery. He also said that the prostitutes "further unsettle the preconceptions of the audience".

The book Marked Women: Prostitutes and Prostitution in the Cinema uses the film as an example of sexual brutality against women in films.

== Reception ==
Vincent Canby wrote in The New York Times that Anthony Perkins "gives a good, funny, if somewhat lopsided performance as the madman of medicine".

TV Guide reviewed the film, giving it 1 out of 4 stars and saying, "EDGE OF SANITY obviously isn't meant to be taken seriously, despite its expensive production values and surrealistic photography—both surprisingly good. But the rest of EDGE OF SANITY (shot mostly in Budapest with some English exteriors) doesn't measure up to its technical proficiency." Leonard Maltin described the film as "Tasteless, pointless, and unpleasant".
