= Nick Robinson (English actor) =

English actor (born 1986)

- Born: Nicholas Robinson; January 1, 1986 (age 40); Peterborough, Cambridgeshire, England
- Occupation: Actor, producer
- Years active: 1993–present
- Known for: Goodnight Mister Tom
- Spouse: A.J. West (m. 2019)

Nicholas Robinson (born January 1, 1986) is an English actor who has appeared regularly on British television, most notably as William Beech in Goodnight Mister Tom (1998), starring John Thaw. He also played the lead in the television series Harry and the Wrinklies (1999–2002) based upon the book of the same name by Alan Temperley, produced by Scottish Television.

== Career ==
He began his career in theatre and, at the age of 7, appeared in the West End transfer of An Inspector Calls, produced by the National Theatre, at the Aldwych Theatre. His next appearance was in Théâtre de Complicité's production of The Caucasian Chalk Circle in the Olivier Theatre and on its national tour. He later played the title role in the Royal Shakespeare Company's production of Little Eyolf, directed by Adrian Noble.

Robinson was most famous for his role in Goodnight Mister Tom. The film won the awards of the Bafta for the Most Popular TV programme in 1998 voted for by readers of Radio Times, Best Drama performance in 1999 and the Best ITV/Channel 5 Programme of 1998.

He has made appearances in a number of other television programmes including an episode of Midsomer Murders and he was also in the film version of Tom's Midnight Garden. Other appearances include The Ruth Rendell Mysteries, Urban Gothic and Down to Earth.

Robinson also works extensively as a producer; most recently he presented the UK premiere production of Rodgers and Hammerstein's State Fair directed by Thom Southerland, at the Trafalgar Studios in London's West End. Other credits include The Full Monty at the New Players' Theatre, Calamity Jane at Upstairs at the Gatehouse, Singin' in the Rain at the Broadway Studio, Call Me Madam at Upstairs at the Gatehouse and The Unsinkable Molly Brown at the Landor Theatre. Later this year, Robinson will be producing the Pulitzer Prize-winning play The Diary of Anne Frank.

== Personal life ==
Robinson became engaged to author, journalist and Big Brother 2016 contestant A.J. West on 25 December 2018.

== Filmography ==
=== Film ===
Year	Title	Role	Notes
1999	Tom's Midnight Garden	Peter Long	
2000	Vatel	Colin	
2002	Ali and Danny	Danny	

=== Television ===
Year	Title	Role	Notes	Ref.
1998	Goodnight Mister Tom	William Beech	Television film	
1999	Midsomer Murders	Felix Bryce	Episode: "Death's Shadow"	
1999–2002	Harry and the Wrinklies	Harry	21 episodes	
2000	The Ruth Rendell Mysteries	Edward Devenish	Episode: "Harm Done"	
2000	Urban Gothic	Jake	Episode: "Old Nick"	
2003	Down to Earth	Ronan Davies	Episode: "Moving On"	
