= Harry and the Wrinklies (TV series) =

British children's drama television series

- Genre: Children's drama
- Written by: Alan Temperley
- Directed by: Andrew Morgan
- Starring: Nick Robinson
- Country of origin: United Kingdom
- Original language: English
- No. of seasons: 3
- No. of episodes: 19

Production
- Running time: 25 mins
- Production company: Scottish Television

Original release
- Network: ITV (CITV)
- Release: 11 May 2000 – 12 December 2002

Harry and the Wrinklies is a British children's drama series based on a novel of the same name by Alan Temperley. It was produced for three series by STV and aired on CITV from 11 May 2000 to 12 December 2002. The show starred Nick Robinson in the role of Harry.

== Synopsis ==
When Harry's parents die on holiday, he is adopted by his aunts. These aunts run an old folks' home where every inhabitant is a retired criminal or scam artist, and these "Wrinklies," in a new twist on the Robin Hood tale, routinely commit various crimes in order to donate large sums of money to charity. The Wrinklies' archenemies were a corrupt judge Percy "Beastly" Priestly and his monstrous fiancée Lavina McScrew aka Gestapo Lil. Harry has a dog called Tangle.

In the second series, Lil brings along her niece Katie to spy on the Wrinklies and to befriend Harry. In the third and final series, Percy invites his brother Piggy to help out with his and Lil's scheming plans while Percy is in prison.

== Cast ==
- Harry Barton - Nick Robinson
- Percy "Beastly" Priestly - Gareth Hunt
- Lavinia "Gestapo Lil" McScrew - Briony McRoberts
- Aunt Bridget - Mona Bruce
- Aunt Florie - Elsie Kelly
- Dot - Toni Palmer
- Huggy - George Sewell
- Max - Victor Spinetti
- Katie - Emma Durkin (Series 2–3)
- Piggy Priestly - Tyler Butterworth (Series 3)
- Freddie - John Quentin (Series 3)

== Episode Guide ==
=== Series 1 ===
No.	Title	Original release date
1	"Part 1"	11 May 2000
Part 1 of 4. When Harry Barton is sent to live with his elderly great aunts, he discovers that they rob banks in order to give money to the poor.
2	"Part 2"	18 May 2000
Part 2 of 4. Harry is in for shock when he discovers that Lavinia McScrew is teaching at his new school.
3	"Part 3"	25 May 2000
Part 3 of 4. When Harry is caught and sent to an institution, it's down to the wrinklies to rescue him.
4	"Part 4"	1 June 2000
Part 4 of 4. The Wrinklies' plan to raid Percy's house is foiled, but after celebrating Harry's birthday they are ready to plan another robbery.

=== Series 2 ===
(Originally Broadcast: 4 May to 15 May 2001)

- Episode 1 - 'The Mayor's Story'
- Episode 2 - 'The Bank's Story'
- Episode 3 - 'Hobnail's Story'
- Episode 4 - 'The Painting Story'
- Episode 5 - 'Ron's Story'
- Episode 6 - 'The Diamond Story'
- Episode 7 - 'The Flashbacks' - selection of clips from S1 and S2

=== Series 3 ===
(Originally Broadcast: 24 October to 12 December 2002 on ITV)

By the start of Series 3 Percy Priestly is in Prison and his brother Mr Piggy stays with Lil McScrew to try to get the better of the Wrinklies.

- Episode 1 - 'Introducing Mr. Piggy'
- Episode 2 - 'Hobnail In Love'
- Episode 3 - 'Where's My Mummy?'
- Episode 4 - 'Madame Acarte'
- Episode 5 - 'Great Movie Scam'
- Episode 6 - 'Great Hospital Robbery'
- Episode 7 - 'Great Pantomime'
- Episode 8 - 'Great TV Show'

NOTE: Since its original broadcast, Series 1 has not been repeated since. Series 2 and 3 have been repeated on and off occasions since February 2007 on the CITV channel. Series 1 has been repeated (in a single, omnibus, edition) by STV and as a Christmas 'special' on STV Glasgow in 2014 and 2015.

== Merchandise ==
Harry and The Wrinklies - VHS (1999)
Harry and The Wrinklies - Book - Written By Alan Temperley (1997)
Harry and The Treasure Of Eddie Carver - Book - Written By Alan Temperley
