= Mary Ellen Ray =

American actress

Mary Ellen Ray (3 January 1931 – 10 September 2004) was an American-born actress who had a career in the United Kingdom.

== Early life ==
She was born as Mary Ellen McPherson in Springfield, Missouri in 1931 to 17 year-old Hayzle McPherson and her husband Owen M. McPherson. Following her parents' divorce in 1937 and her mother's remarriage to Earl Ray, she assumed her stepfather's surname.

== Career ==
Ray spent two years with the ACT Theatre after which she went to the American Shakespeare Festival Theatre at Stratford, Connecticut where she appeared in such plays as The Crucible, Endgame and Under Milk Wood. She made her début at the Stratford Festival at Stratford, Ontario in 1970 as Mariana in All's Well That Ends Well and Mrs William Dudgeon in The Devil's Disciple. In September 1970 she opened in Othello at the American Shakespeare Festival Theatre and appeared with repertory companies in the United States and Britain. The couple separated in 1972 and divorced in 1974.

She made her first television appearance in Britain as Telephone Operator in Long Distance (1958) before acting in the 'Shadow of Heroes' episode of BBC Sunday-Night Theatre (1959). Next she was Waitress in 'The Out-of-Towners' episode of ITV Television Playhouse (1960). Ray progressed to the named role of Nora in 'The Closed Shop' episode of Somerset Maugham Hour (1962) and Miss Cleaver in 'The Night of the Horns' episode of Detective (1964). She was in Theatre 625 (1966), voiced Mrs Dilber in the Oscar-winning animated television special A Christmas Carol (1971) and was Mary Crane in the short Some Kind of Hero (1972). She was Sonia in the television film Artemis 81 (1981); Nursing Staff in the film The Sender (1982); Mrs Bear in the film The Lords of Discipline (1983), and American Wife in the film Invitation to the Wedding (1983).

She was Mrs. Abrams in the television series Tender Is the Night (1985); Aunt Hannah in Back Home (1989); Lynn Nesbit in Selling Hitler (1991); Landlady in Jeeves and Wooster (1992); Teacher in the episode 'I Don't Do Cuddles' of Unnatural Pursuits (1992); Rose Whitfield in The Bill (1994); Marie in the episode 'First Impressions' of Holby City (2000), and Eleanor Forsyth in Doctors (2004). In 1993 she played Mrs Pascal in The House of Yes at the Gate Theatre in London.

== Personal life ==
In 1952, as a 21-year-old secretary, Ray sailed on the RMS Queen Mary from New York to Spain with her two younger siblings and her mother, Hayzle Ray. There, she met the British poet Anthony Edkins (1927–2018) who was teaching English in Ibiza in Spain. The two returned to England until her visa expired leading to their marriage in 1955 in Madrid; the couple had two daughters, Sarah Edkins and Lucy Edkins, a stage manager and actress. In 1966 she and Edkins moved to the United States for three years to allow Ray to pursue her acting career.

Ray met the playwright David Pownall in 1973, with whom she had a son, Tom, in 1974. They collaborated together in the company ‘Paines Plough’ in Lancaster and London.

Ray died in Kensington in London in 2004 aged 73.

== Filmography ==
=== Film ===
Year	Title	Role	Notes
1972	Some Kind of Hero	Mary Crane	
1982	The Sender	Nursing Staff	
1983	The Lords of Discipline	Mrs. Bear	
1985	Invitation to the Wedding	American Wife	

=== Television ===
Year	Title	Role	Notes
1958	Long Distance	Telephone operator	Television film
1959	Sunday Night Theatre	—	Episode: "Shadow of Heroes"
1960	ITV Television Playhouse	Waitress	Episode: "The Out-of-Towners"
1962	Somerset Maugham Hour	Nora	Episode: "The Closed Shop"
1964	Thorndyke	Miss Cleaver	Episode: "The Night of the Horns"
1966	Theatre 625	—	Episode: "Focus"
1981	Artemis 81	Sonia	Television film
1985	Tender Is the Night	Mrs. Abrams	Episode: "1925"
1989	Back Home	Aunt Hannah	Television film
1991	Selling Hitler	Lynn Nesbit	Episode #1.3
1992	Jeeves and Wooster	Landlady	Episode: "Full House"
1992	Unnatural Pursuits	Teacher	Episode: "I Don't Do Cuddles"
1994	The Bill	Rose Whitfield	Episode: "Mean Streak
2000	Holby City	Marie	Episode: "First Impressions"
2004	Doctors	Eleanor Forsyth	Episode: "Cross My Heart"
