= A.J. West =

English author

- Born: Andrew John West; 23 April 1982 (age 44); Northampton, England
- Other names: Andy West; AJ West
- Education: University of Central Lancashire
- Spouse: Nicholas Robinson (m. 2019)
- Website: ajwestauthor.com

Andrew John West (born 23 April 1982) is an English author and journalist. His debut novel The Spirit Engineer won the HWA Debut Crown, while his second novel The Betrayal of Thomas True (2024) became a #2 Sunday Times bestseller and won the CWA Historical Dagger.

Prior to his novels, West worked as a reporter for BBC Newsline and was a Big Brother 17 (2016) finalist on Channel 5.

== Early life ==
West was born in Northampton and grew up in Newport Pagnell. West attended Portfields Primary School and then Ousedale School. He graduated with a Bachelor of Arts (BA) from the University of Central Lancashire.

== Career ==
Early in his journalism career, West contributed to The Independent. West joined BBC Newsline in 2014, relocating to Belfast. In 2015, West publicly condemned Tyson Fury's nomination for Sports Personality of the Year in light of Fury's homophobic comments. He was subsequently suspended from his position at BBC Northern Ireland. Micky Murray, then chairperson of Alliance LGBT, called the suspension "ridiculous". West resigned shortly after.

West was subsequently selected to be a contestant in the seventeenth series of the Channel 5 reality series Big Brother in 2016. West made it to the finals and finished in fourth place. Later that year, West was cast in a pilot for a gay panel show, but it was not picked up for series.

In 2020, Duckworth Books acquired the rights to publish West's debut novel The Spirit Engineer in 2021. Set in 1914 Belfast, the gothic novel is inspired by the true story of the titular William Jackson Crawford's liaisons with Kathleen Goligher. The Spirit Engineer won the Debut Crown at the Historical Writers Association (HWA) Awards and the Berties Book of the Year Tournament.

West signed a two-book deal with Orenda Books in 2023, through which he published his second novel The Betrayal of Thomas True in 2024. Following the titular character in early 18th-century London, West became motivated to write the novel upon learning of Margaret Clap's molly house. The Betrayal of Thomas True became a #2 Sunday Times bestseller and won the Historical Dagger at the Crime Writers' Association (CWA) Awards.

In 2025, West discovered pirated copies of his novels on LibGen had been used to train Meta's AI models without his permission or compensation. West said it felt "like I've been mugged". He joined the Society of Authors Day of Action protest outside Meta's headquarters in April.

In October 2026, West was a guest on the Off the Shelf podcast.

== Adaptation ==
Canderblinks Film optioned the rights to adapt The Spirit Engineer for film, penned by Susannah Wise.

== Personal life ==
West was briefly engaged to Ed Hutton, whom he met while living in Belfast; their relationship ended in summer 2016 when it emerged Hutton had been unfaithful. In 2021, West revealed he went through a period of poor mental health after his time on Big Brother.

In 2017, West began a relationship with actor Nicholas Robinson. The couple became engaged on Christmas Day 2018 and married on Christmas Eve 2019 in St Ives. They live in South London.

West became a patron of Humanists UK in 2025.

As of September 2026, West was going through a divorce and he has moved into a motorhome. West is currently touring the UK with his latest book.

He frequently updates his socials detailing daily life in the motorhome.

== Bibliography ==
=== Novels ===
- The Spirit Engineer (2021)
- The Betrayal of Thomas True (2024)
- The Deadly Inheritance of Everest MacDonald (2027)

=== Non-fiction ===
- How Queer Bookshops Changed the World (2026)
