= Back Home (novel) =

1984 novel by Michelle Magorian

- First edition
- Author: Michelle Magorian
- Language: English
- Genre: Children's historical novel
- Publisher: Harper & Row
- Publication date: 1984
- Publication place: United Kingdom
- Media type: Print (hardcover)
- Pages: 384 pp (first edition)
- ISBN: 978-0-06-024103-2
- OCLC: 10998796
- LC Class: PZ7.M275 Bac 1984

Back Home is a children's historical novel by Michelle Magorian, first published in 1984. The novel was adapted into a TV drama, Back Home (1990), starring Hayley Mills and Haley Carr, and again in 2001 starring Sarah Lancashire, Stephanie Cole and Jessica Fox.

== Plot summary ==
Twelve-year-old Virginia 'Rusty' Dickinson (so-called due to her auburn hair) is an evacuee returning home to England near the end of World War Two. After having lived in the US since the age of seven, Rusty barely remembers England or her parents, and hasn't met her four-year-old brother Charlie at all. Rusty's an outgoing, confident, creative girl who loves the outdoors and working with her hands.

The story opens with Rusty's arrival at the docks in Plymouth where she is greeted by her mother, Peggy. Rusty initially doesn't recognise Peggy who, in turn, is taken aback by how grown-up her daughter is. Rusty is surprised to see how run down the town is, how shabby her mother's clothes are, and shocked by the bombed out buildings they pass. Rusty and Peggy make the journey to the countryside near Totnes where Peggy and Charlie have been living during the war. There Rusty meets Beatie, the old friendly woman who owns the house, Ivy, a young woman whose first husband is missing, presumed dead, and who is now engaged to an American G.I., Ivy's five-year-old daughter Susan, and Charlie. Charlie, who was born while Rusty was in the US, is suspicious and unwelcoming towards his new sister.

Rusty spends the following days feeling out of place in her new home. Peggy is cool and distant towards her, treats her like a child, and scolds her for unexpectedly mundane things, like talking about her American family, the Omsks. Rusty feels resentful towards her mother as Peggy doesn't appear to want to get to know her daughter, and instead spends a large portion of her days out working as a mechanic with the Women's Volunteer Service. Their mutual incomprehension comes to a head when Rusty heads out alone on the river in a rowboat, only to return hours later to find her mother furious with her for leaving without permission. The owner of the boat, thirteen-year-old Beth Hatherley, is initially angry with Rusty for taking the boat, however soon softens towards Rusty. They strike up the beginnings of a friendship, but are hampered by Peggy's protectiveness. Beth introduces Rusty to her three siblings and tells her about her school, a forward-thinking and progressive place (possibly based on Dartington Hall School considering the setting) that encourages creativity and independence. Rusty overhears her mother telling Beatie that the school isn't the right kind of place to receive a serious education, and that she is set in her plans to send Rusty to boarding school. This makes Rusty feel even more isolated from her mother. The only person aside from Beth to show Rusty any real warmth or affection is Beatie.

With the declaration of Japanese surrender marking the end of the war, Peggy reluctantly takes the children back to their home in Guildford, Surrey, where they lived before the war, and where Rusty's paternal grandmother still lives. Rusty is disappointed to find that her grandmother is different from Beatie in every sense: she disapproves of Peggy's work as a mechanic, is harsh with Charlie, and has clear disdain for Rusty's American accent, clothing, and manners. As challenging as life was in Devon, Rusty finds living with her grandmother even more irksome. She endures her grandmother's snide comments until the beginning of the school term, when Rusty's sent away to school. Her new school, Benwood House, is a strict all-girls boarding school, where she will be living during the week. Peggy is permitting her to come home at weekends. To Rusty's disbelief, she finds Benwood to be even more unpleasant than Guildford. There are countless rules, many of which strike Rusty as arbitrary. Prohibited behaviour includes holding hands or hugging, getting out of bed before the morning bell, going for walks alone, putting hands in pockets, talking back, or the use of slang. These last two rules cause a great deal of trouble as Rusty is accustomed to speaking her mind and saying things like 'OK' and 'uh-huh'. Rusty struggles to make friends at Benwood. The other girls are openly hostile towards her. She's also the worst in the class at most of her subjects. The areas where she excels - art, gym, and Greek dance - are soon cancelled in favour of extra Latin and maths revision.

Rusty spends her weeks shuttling between Benwood, which she hates, and Guildford, which she hates equally. She's intensely homesick and daydreams incessantly about her American family: Aunt Hannah, Uncle Bruno, Jinkie, Alice, Kathryn, and Skeet, and her best girl friend, Janey. One night she's so desperately lonely that she climbs out onto the high scaffolding that encases the school building, intending to jump off it to her death. Once she gets out there, however, she finds she can't go through with it. Instead, an idea occurs to her. She realises that she can shinny down the scaffolding, climb the school wall, and disappear into the forest for a few hours. She relishes the freedom she feels in the woods, and resolves to keep returning night after night.

One day Rusty meets a boy, Lance, from a nearby school who was also a US evacuee. She discovers that Lance lived in the same town as her US grandparents, the Fitzes. For the first time since returning to England Rusty feels happy and connected with someone who understands what she's going through. Unfortunately, talking to boys is strictly forbidden at Benwood, and Rusty is severely punished. Despite this, she manages to pass a message to Lance to meet her at midnight behind her school. From then on Rusty includes Lance in her nighttime forest wanderings and the two become friends. One night they stumble upon a bombed-out cottage that has an intact, albeit bare, sitting room. Rusty dubs the room their 'cabin in the woods'.

Despite Lance and the little cabin, Rusty is still desperately lonely. Her unhappiness is compounded by the news that Beatie, who has always complained of 'ruddy indigestion', has died. Rusty and Peggy go to Devon for the reading of Beatie's will. Beatie leaves Rusty her collection of woodworking tools and leaves Peggy the house, with the condition that she's not to sell it for seventeen years and, if she does choose to sell it after that time, that she only sell it to a woman. These terms mean that Peggy cannot be forced by Roger to sell the house or put it into her husband's name, making her independent if she chooses to be. Rusty and Peggy spend the weekend in Devon and start to get to know each other a little better. Rusty discovers that her mother is actually fun and adventurous and that they surprisingly have quite a lot in common.

Upon their return to Guildford, things are made worse when Rusty's father, Roger, returns from Asia where he's been stationed in the army. A hard man, Roger fails to connect with Rusty, Peggy, or Charlie. He belittles Peggy, is harsh with Charlie who constantly compares him to 'Uncle Harvey' since he was led to believe his father would play with him, and is horrified by Rusty's boldness. Rusty watches her mother struggle to come to terms with Roger's return. Roger is surprised that Rusty comes home at weekends and thinks it would be better if she were a full-time boarder. He also thinks it unnecessary that she's in the university-geared A-stream at school, instead suggesting that she would be better off doing a cookery course when she graduates and then getting married. While Rusty resents her mother's insistence on academic excellence, her father's plan for marrying her off seems no more appealing.

When Peggy is away for the day, Rusty finds that Roger has taken Charlie out alone while she is asked to have tea with her grandmother. Rusty is suspicious when she sees Charlie's beloved teddy bear abandoned since he always carrys it with him. When Roger returns with Charlie, it is revealed that he forcibly held his son down while a barber shaved the boy's head. Charlie is traumatised, has soiled himself and is begging for Peggy. Roger loses his temper and tries to beat Charlie with the cane but Rusty protects him, taking the beating herself before taking Charlie upstairs to bathe him and put him to bed. Charlie insists on sleeping with Rusty and asks her if they can go 'back home' to Devon. After this the relationship between the siblings is better since Charlie sees Rusty as a friend against his hated grandmother and father. Peggy returns and is furious about the punishment but feels unable to do anything more to protect her children since Roger is head of the household.

After the Christmas break, during which things deteriorate rapidly between Rusty and Roger, Rusty returns to Benwood House with a letter from her parents informing the headmistress that Rusty is to no longer come home on weekends, and is to instead become a full-time boarder. Rusty neglects to pass on the letter. When the weekend rolls around she leaves the school as usual but, instead of being greeted by Peggy, slips away into the forest. She spends the weekend sprucing up the cabin in the woods. She finds and repairs old furniture in the rubble. She paints the walls with traditional American stencils, washes the curtains, builds shelves, and chops wood. She returns to school on Monday with nobody the wiser. She does the same thing the following weekend, and then the weekend after that. Once back at school, she's brought back to reality when the headmistress announces the impending removal of the scaffolding, effectively ending Rusty's nighttime adventures. Panicked, Rusty resolves to run away back to the Omsks'.

She slips out of school one morning and heads for Plymouth, but accidentally gets off at the wrong stop. She realises that she's near Beatie's house, so walks through the wintry countryside. The journey takes her all day. As she walks she thinks about her American family, and about how they always gently reminded her that she had a real family back in England who loved her and missed her. Rusty finally reaches Beatie's house and also reaches the decision that she won't be able to run away to the US as she's grown to love her mother and doesn't want to leave her again. Thin, starved, and freezing, Rusty falls asleep on the floor in Beatie's empty house. She's woken by Beth and Mrs Hatherley wrapping her in blankets and lighting a fire to keep her warm. Rusty returns to Benwood with Mrs Hatherly to find police officers, teachers, and Peggy frantic with worry. Police have discovered the cabin in the woods. Peggy is astounded by Rusty's decorating talent and, once she sees the height of the scaffolding, appreciates for the first time how desperate Rusty must have been to have scaled it in the dark. Rusty and Peggy are summoned to see the headmistress. Rusty is expelled from Benwood and told that no other school will have her. Peggy and Rusty return to Guildford to face Roger and Mrs Dickinson Senior's wrath.

The final chapter of the story leaps forward several months to spring. The reader learns that Peggy has left Roger and has taken Rusty and Charlie back to live in Beatie's house in Devon. Rusty has accepted that she will probably always feel a bit American, but that her life in England has its own beauty and joy. She feels the budding potential for real happiness as she gets to know her mother better. Rusty has her own room which she has been given free rein to decorate. She has also been enrolled in the progressive school attended by Beth and the Hatherly brothers. On Rusty's first day, Peggy and Charlie take her to school, where she's shown around by Beth's brother Harry. She sees the way teachers speak respectfully to the students and the way that students seem to genuinely enjoy being at school. The story ends with Rusty meeting some fellow students who show an interest in her and have the potential to become real friends.

== Characters ==
Virginia 'Rusty' Dickinson Evacuated from Britain at age 7 as a timid and shy child, 12-year-old Rusty returns as a confident and very American teenager. During her evacuation she stayed in Connecticut with the lively Omsk family, who encouraged her talents and belief in herself, drawing her out of her shell. Rusty loves bright colours, art and music- she has especially talent at woodwork and stencil crafts which she was taught by 'Aunt' Hannah Omsk. Initially unhappy on her return to England, Rusty finds friends in Beth & Beattie Langley and refuses to alter her character to fit in with the hidebound English girls. Rusty can be considered brave, outspoken, creative and passionate. Although Rusty spends most of the novel disliking being back in England after the freedom and acceptance of America, she grows to love her mother and brother and is happy when they return to Devon, no longer thinking of America as her home.

Margaret 'Peggy' Dickinson Forced to evacuate her little daughter during the war, Peggy joined the WVS and become a stronger woman through it with a talent for vehicle mechanics. Before her marriage Peggy lived with her parents and after her marriage she lived with her husband and mother in law. Through her friendship with Beattie and Harvey, Peggy learns self confidence and to trust her own judgement which was not encouraged when she lived with her husband as she was seen as inferior to Roger and his mother. Peggy is a good example of how British women's roles changed during the war, moving into jobs traditionally held by men and often becoming the sole breadwinner for their family because of being widowed or their husbands being away fighting.

Charlie Dickinson Born while his father was away fighting, Charlie is in the sole care of his mother in Devon until the family move back to London. Much like Virginia, Charlie has red hair and likes music and the outdoors although he initially doesn't like his sister as he is not used to sharing his mother. He had a father figure in his mother's American GI friend Uncle Harvey, whom he adored, and he carries his teddy bear with him everywhere. He is miserable when they leave Devon for London, hating his grandmother and father who are unkind to him and missing his friends. He gets in to trouble for picking flowers from neighbouring gardens, not understanding that the flowers in London are not wild as he is used to. He develops the habit of wetting his bed in London but stops when he returns to Devon.

Roger Dickinson A traditional upper middle class Englishman, Roger has spent the past few years away fighting and returns to discover a changed world - his wife is self-sufficient, his daughter very Americanised and his son has no bond with him at all and keeps talking about Uncle Harvey. Roger thinks of Charlie as being 'namby-pamby and tied to his mother's apron strings', although failing to see that he has to try and get to know his children. Roger is also tied to his own mother and gives her more respect in the household than Peggy. Roger is not deliberately unkind or unfeeling, but has trouble adjusting to the changes in his family and to the altered England he returns to. He represents the old England before the war and the problems which come from not adapting or being open to change.

Mrs Dickenson Senior A domineering, selfish and snobbish woman, the older Mrs Dickenson is the opposite of Beattie Langley, who has become a mother figure to Peggy. Refusing to contribute to the war effort, she has preserved her house entirely as it was before the war and is displeased with her grandchildren and daughter in law. Rusty often clashes with her, saying that "you are always bitching about someone or other in your sugary voice". Has a bad habit of taking the phone off the hook and other controlling ways, is deliberately manipulative and disruptive when Roger returns home in order to discredit Peggy.

The Honourable Beatie Langley The Devon landlady of Peggy and Charlie, Beatie is a warm and welcome presence in the story. Kind, open minded, cheerful, perceptive and generous, Beatie gave away all of her curtains and many possessions to help the war effort – material was in short supply – and happily shared her rambling and leaky-roofed house with several women who were serving in the forces. Beatie, while never openly saying so, clearly knows about Peggy's home situation and after her death she leaves Peggy her house on condition that Peggy can't sell for 17 years nor can the house be held in a man's name, thus giving Peggy a way to escape her marriage if she wants to by preventing Roger forcing Peggy to put the house into his name. Beatie shows how some people adjusted well with proper British spirit to the trials of war. She dies of her "ruddy indigestion" which is likely to be stomach cancer.

Lance A fellow sea evacuee of Rusty's, Lance attends the boys' school near Rusty's and is also ostracised for his American accent and behaviour. He provides Rusty with a friend as he sneaks out to meet her in their cabin in the woods, admires her talent with handicrafts and they help each other with their schoolwork. Lance's parents are getting divorced and to escape the house he goes for long runs in the holidays which leads to him joining the school rugby team and being accepted by other students.

== Minor characters ==
Beth a local Devon girl who becomes friends with Rusty, Beth is practical and forthright. When Rusty runs away she goes to Beth's house after deciding not to try and get to America. Beth and her mother then accompany Rusty back to London and remain with her until Peggy arrives. When Peggy, Rusty and Charlie return to Devon, Beth helps Rusty and Charlie be accepted into the local school and becomes a close friend.

Ivy The other woman resident in Beattie's house, Ivy has a little girl of Charlie's age and her husband is Missing Believed Killed. Ivy marries an American GI who was a friend of Uncle Harvey but during the novel her husband is found in a POW camp, making the second marriage void, despite Ivy being heavily pregnant with her new husband's child. This was a situation that did happen quite often during the war, when one partner was presumed dead and their spouse moved on, only to discover that they were alive years later and that their new union wasn't lawful.

Uncle Harvey Although he does not appear in person in the novel as he has returned to America, Harvey was a good friend to Peggy and a father figure to Charlie who constantly mentions how Harvey would play with him and spend time with him. Harvey has a fiancee living back home in the US. Harvey and Peggy enjoyed spending time together, although Peggy denies that there was anything inappropriate about their relationship or that they were lovers. Harvey represents the idea of a more modern man who takes on childcare duties and is more open with his wife, as well as being the type of father Charlie would have loved to have. Juxtaposed with Roger, Harvey is a sympathetic and kind man who shows Peggy that she is worth more than Roger seems to think.

Aunt Hannah and Uncle Bruno Omsk

Rusty's American host family, the Omsks embraced their role as surrogate parents but always made sure Rusty never referred to them as 'Mom' or 'Pop'. Encouraging, kind, and reasonable, the Omsks are creative and practical people who continue to send Rusty letters and presents.

== Adaptations ==
In 1990 the novel was adapted to a television film, directed by Piers Haggard and produced by Television South and the Walt Disney Company starring, Hayley Mills as Mrs. Peggy Dickinson, Hayley Carr as Virginia "Rusty" Dickinson, Adam Stevenson as Charles "Charlie" Dickinson, Brenda Bruce as The Honourable Lady Beatrice "Beatie" Langley, Jean Anderson as Grandmother Dickinson and Rupert Frazer as Mr. Roger Dickinson. In 2001, a feature film was also released, with considerable adaptations to the original plot.

In 1995, the story was adapted in 4 parts for BBC Radio 4.
