= Harry and the Wrinklies =

Children's novel written by British author Alan Temperley

- Original book cover
- Author: Alan Temperley
- Language: English
- Genre: Children's novel
- Publisher: Scholastic
- Publication date: February 1998 (paperback)
- Publication place: United Kingdom
- Media type: Print (Hardback/Paperback)
- Pages: 288 pp
- ISBN: 0-590-11349-6
- OCLC: 40906611
- Followed by: Harry and the Treasure of Eddie Carver

Harry and the Wrinklies is a children's novel written by British author Alan Temperley. The book was published in paperback in February 1998 by Scholastic. It was Temperley's second published novel, after Murdo's War in 1988. A sequel, Harry and the Treasure of Eddie Carver, was released in hardback in March 2004.

== Plot ==
When Harry's parents die in an unexplained accident, Harry has to go and live with his seemingly eccentric Great-Aunts. He's anxious about living with elderly relatives, but relieved to escape his cruel nanny, whom he nicknamed Gestapo Lil. He soon realises that the ancient aunts are not as doddering as he first thought. When he finds out their secret, he likens them to Robin Hood and his Merry Men. However beastly Priestly, their next door neighbour is sneaking round Lagg Hall, making trouble. When he turns up with his new fiancée, Gestapo Lil, it is time for the Wrinklies to take action, along with their newest recruit, Harry.

== TV Adaptation ==
The book was adapted into a TV series of the same name which ran from 1999 until 2002 on CITV. The TV series was rerun in 2009 on STV's weekend kids' TV block wknd@stv.

== Film adaptation ==
In April 2020, Disney announced that Stephen Mangan, who had previously voiced an audiobook of Harry and the Wrinklies, had been signed up to write a live action feature film adaptation of the book.
