= The National Health (film) =

1973 British satirical film by Jack Gold

- Theatrical release poster
- Directed by: Jack Gold
- Written by: Peter Nichols
- Based on: The National Health by Peter Nichols
- Produced by: Terry Glinwood; Ned Sherrin
- Starring: Lynn Redgrave; Colin Blakely; Eleanor Bron; Donald Sinden; Jim Dale
- Cinematography: John Coquillon
- Edited by: Ralph Sheldon
- Music by: Carl Davis
- Color process: Eastmancolor
- Production company: Virgin Films
- Distributed by: Columbia Pictures
- Release dates: 6 March 1973 (London); 10 August 1979 (USA)
- Running time: 98 minutes
- Country: United Kingdom
- Language: English

The National Health is a 1973 British black comedy film directed by Jack Gold and starring Lynn Redgrave, Colin Blakely and Eleanor Bron. It is based on the 1969 play The National Health by Peter Nichols, in which the staff struggle to cope in a NHS hospital.

== Plot ==
The film satirically interweaves the story of a depressing and poorly-equipped National Health Service hospital with a fantasy hospital which exists in a soap-opera world where all the equipment is new and patients are miraculously cured – although the only "patients" seen are doctors or nurses who are themselves part of the soap opera plots. In the real hospital, the patients die while the out-of-touch administrators focus on impressing foreign visitors.

== Cast ==
- Lynn Redgrave as Nurse Sweet / Nurse Betty Martin
- Colin Blakely as Edward Loach
- Eleanor Bron as Sister McFee / Sister Mary MacArthur
- Donald Sinden as Mr. Carr / Senior Surgeon Boyd
- Jim Dale as Mr. Barnet / Dr. Neil Boyd
- Sheila Scott Wilkinson as Nurse Powell / Staff Nurse Cleo Norton
- Neville Aurelius as Leyland / Monk
- Gillian Barge as Dr. Bird
- George Browne as The Chaplain
- Patience Collier as the lady visitor
- Jumoke Debayo as Nurse Lake
- Robert Gillespie as Tyler
- John Hamill as Kenny
- Don Hawkins as Les
- James Hazeldine as student doctor
- Bob Hoskins as Desmond Foster
- David Hutcheson as Mr Mackie
- Mervyn Johns as Doctor Rees
- Bert Palmer as Mr Flagg
- Maureen Pryor as the matron
- Richie Stewart as mortuary attendant
- Clive Swift as Mervyn Ash
- Graham Weston as Michael

== Production ==
Producer Ned Sherrin said that he wanted Michael Blakemore, who had directed the play on stage, to direct the film but Columbia would not approve him. The film was an attempt by Virgin Films to move into more prestigious projects.

Filming took place in June 1972. The hospital scenes were shot at Red Barracks, Woolwich, which stood in as the fictional Princess Maria of Battenberg Hospital.

== Reception ==
=== Box office ===
According to Sherrin, the film "did well" in England but was not released in the US for another decade.

=== Critical ===
The Evening Standard said it has "fitted very well on to the big screen." The Sunday Mirror called it "the best British film for ages." The Observer called it "admirably unsentimental, compassionate and very funny."

The Monthly Film Bulletin wrote: "The National Health is M.A.S.H. without the mayhem – an unsentimental, uncomfortably comic and barely exaggerated portrayal of British welfare medicine, the most well-meaning on earth, but dispiritingly undermanned, depersonalised, and bogged down in bedpans and logistics. "Here in England", observes Jim Dale's lugubrious ward orderly, "we have as high a standard of dying as anywhere in the free world". The only reminder, in fact, that the nearest one usually gets to this kind of comment is Carry On Nurse is the presence of Jim Dale, though that is meant to be far from disparaging: he all but steals the picture with his portrait of cheerfully cynical vulgarity, relishing Nichols' best lines ("One slip", he quips as he shaves a patient in preparation for an abdominal operation, "and Bob's your auntie!") and neatly rounding out the role with the cold sneer he gives to departing patients over whom he has affectionately fussed. The acting throughout is flawless, with perhaps the best moments provided by Clive Swift's basket-weaving ulcer victim, Colin Blakely's grumbling amnesiac, Lynn Redgrave's devoted, put-upon nurse, and Donald Sinden – in one of several double cameos – as a brash consultant ("Your bum any better ?") and soap opera surgeon ("To err is hooman")."

Leslie Halliwell said: "Acerbic comedy from a National Theatre play which mixes tragedy and farce into a kind of Carry on Dying."

The Radio Times Guide to Films gave the film 3/5 stars, writing: "Director Jack Gold assembles some sprightly set pieces and fine actors (Donald Sinden, Lynn Redgave, Jim Dale) who give real clout to the sometimes contrived satire."
