= The House of Yes =

1997 film by Mark Waters

- Theatrical release poster
- Directed by: Mark Waters
- Screenplay by: Mark Waters
- Based on: The House of Yes by Wendy MacLeod
- Produced by: Beau Flynn; Stefan Simchowitz
- Starring: Parker Posey; Josh Hamilton; Tori Spelling; Freddie Prinze Jr.; Geneviève Bujold
- Cinematography: Michael Spiller
- Edited by: Pamela Martin
- Music by: Rolfe Kent
- Production company: Bandeira Entertainment
- Distributed by: Miramax Films
- Release date: October 10, 1997
- Running time: 85 minutes
- Country: United States
- Language: English
- Budget: $1.5 million
- Box office: $626,057

The House of Yes is a 1997 American dark comedy film adapted from the play of the same name by Wendy MacLeod. The film was written and directed by Mark Waters (in his directorial debut), produced by Robert Berger, and stars Parker Posey, Josh Hamilton, Tori Spelling, Freddie Prinze Jr. and Geneviève Bujold. It was released in the United States by Miramax Films on October 10, 1997. The House of Yes received a divided critical reaction, with Posey winning a Sundance Award and Spelling receiving a Razzie Award nomination.

== Plot ==
On Thanksgiving in 1983, Marty Pascal travels from New York City to McLean, Virginia, to visit his family: mother Mrs. Pascal, younger brother Anthony, and twin sister "Jackie-O". Jackie-O, recently released from a psychiatric hospital, is obsessed with Jacqueline Kennedy Onassis and often dresses as her in the pink suit she wore when John F. Kennedy was assassinated. Marty surprises his family with news he is engaged; he introduces his fiancée Lesly, a waitress at a doughnut store. Lesly's arrival disrupts the family's gathering, and Jackie-O conspires to break the couple up.

It soon becomes apparent that Marty and Jackie-O started an incestuous relationship as teenagers. Jackie-O convinces Marty to play their favorite childhood "game", involving using a gun loaded with blanks to re-enact the Kennedy assassination; she created the "game" as foreplay when he hesitated before the first time they had sex. A horrified Lesly witnesses the encounter and is comforted by Anthony, who had already told her of Marty and Jackie's incestuous relationship. He convinces Lesly that he is a virgin, leading to a brief and awkward sexual encounter. Lesly ultimately rejects Anthony, who reveals that Jackie once shot Marty because she did not want him to leave for New York. Shortly afterward, Mrs. Pascal orders Lesly to return alone to New York in the morning, threatening to tell Marty about her affair with Anthony.

In the morning, upon seeing the gun next to the twins, Mrs. Pascal demands that Marty hide it. Lesly confronts Marty about what she witnessed. Marty breaks down and begs Lesly to return to New York with him. Jackie-O convinces Marty that she will let him leave if he agrees to play the game one final time. She finds the gun, then recalls the events that led to their absent father's departure; Marty claims that he walked out on the family the day of the Kennedy assassination, but Jackie-O believes that he was shot by Mrs. Pascal and buried in the backyard. Jackie-O fires the gun at Marty, now loaded with real bullets, killing him. Footage of Jackie Kennedy is then shown as Lesly screams. Lesly runs from the house and a flashback shows Jackie-O in her costume as a teenager, being filmed by Marty as she asks him to "stop it", then gives him a coy smile.

== Cast ==
- Parker Posey as Jackie-O
- Josh Hamilton as Marty
- Tori Spelling as Lesly
- Freddie Prinze Jr. as Anthony
- Geneviève Bujold as Mrs. Pascal

In addition, Rachael Leigh Cook and David Love have cameos as young Jackie-O and the voice of young Marty, respectively.

== Production and release ==
The House of Yes was reportedly financed entirely by Tori Spelling's father Aaron Spelling and his company Spelling Entertainment. When it was released, director Mark Waters described his own work as "part Gothic revenge drama, part contemporary psychological thriller, and extremely funny". It premiered at the 1997 Sundance Film Festival, where its screening attracted the interest of Miramax. According to Variety, Miramax paid two million dollars to acquire the distribution rights to the film. The House of Yes was given a limited theatrical release beginning on October 10, 1997. The film was a box-office disappointment, grossing $626,057 on its $1.5 million budget.

Reflecting on his experiences during the making of The House of Yes, Prinze Jr. believe the film was a turning point in his career. Prinze Jr. said the passion of Waters and co-star Parker Posey made him fall in love with acting. He recalled not being "smooth with women at all" when it was filmed, and had trouble doing a scene where he had to kiss Tori Spelling's character. In a 2020 interview, Prinze Jr. said he was "such a young, naive actor" at the time, adding that "[Waters] helped me so, so much. He also directed Mean Girls with Lindsay Lohan. He really just pulls beautiful performances out of people."

Currently, most of the film's rights belong to Paramount. At the time of the film's release, producer Spelling Films was partly owned by Viacom (now known as Paramount Skydance), before being completely bought out by Viacom in 1999. In 2020, Paramount also acquired a 49% ownership stake in the film's theatrical and home video distributor Miramax, which had been under the control of Qatari group beIN since 2016.

== Reception ==
On the review aggregator website Rotten Tomatoes, the film holds an approval rating of 62% based on 39 reviews, with an average rating of 5.9/10. On Metacritic the film has a score of 58% based on reviews from 16 critics, indicating "mixed or average reviews".

Siskel and Ebert gave the film two thumbs down on the October 25, 1997, episode of their syndicated television program. Roger Ebert looked upon the film more favorably in his review for the Chicago Sun-Times with a 2.5 star review, that praised the dialogue and Posey's intense performance as carrying the film. However, Ebert added: "When the film was over I was not particularly pleased that I had seen it [yet] While it was running, I was not bored."

In his positive review for Entertainment Weekly, Owen Gleiberman wrote that "The House of Yes is knowingly overripe, a kitsch melodrama that dares to make incest sexy." He also praised the casting of Posey, noting that "Parker Posey may never have a role that suits her as perfectly." Of Spelling, Dennis Harvey of Variety wrote, "Casting Spelling as the fiancee was an inspired stroke, as auds already associate her with a certain cluelessness but she’s actually quite good, too, as Lesly gradually reveals a surprising determination beneath her squarer-than-square surface."

Reviewing the film at the Sundance Festival, Noah Cowan of Filmmaker magazine praised Posey and Spelling's performances, however, he further noted that "the crazy bourgeois family drama feels claustrophobic for all the wrong reasons: overtly theatrical, it has too much chatter, exaggerated characterizations and a narrative circle closed tight to the point of strangulation." The Austin Chronicle acknowledged the strong performances of the cast, but stated, "it's just that there's really not all that much for them to do."

The House of Yes was included in Magill's Cinema Annual 1998: A Survey of the Films of 1997. The book states that, "like The Myth of Fingerprints (1997), Mark Waters' directorial debut is another entry in the dysfunctional, home-for-the-holidays genre, only this movie is one creepy black comedy", adding that "[the] shocking tale of family secrets is both perversely funny and fearless." The book said that Posey was "perfectly cast as the glamorous yet twisted Jackie-O", claiming that her performance is "the highlight of the film – she far outshines the other actors with her dead-on portrayal of an unstable young woman about to go over the edge."

A contemporary negative review came from Rex Reed of The New York Observer. He wrote in October 1997, "The House of Yes is supposed to be what unhinged rookie playwrights call a 'black comedy', but as Molly used to say to Fibber McGee on the radio, “T’ain’t funny, McGee." Reed criticized the claustrophobic nature of the film and the "static" direction of Waters, saying "at least the misfits in Home for the Holidays and The Myth of Fingerprints got away from the cranberry sauce from time to time and actually fled the claustrophobia of the dining room table. The loony tunes in The House of Yes don’t look as if they even remember the last time they breathed real air or ate real food." He also disliked Tori Spelling's role in the film, remarking, "does the fact that Mr. Spelling provided the financing have anything to do with this hapless miscasting? Just asking."

For her performance, Posey was awarded a Special Recognition for Acting Award at Sundance.
