= Man Friday (film) =

1975 film by Jack Gold

- Theatrical release poster
- Directed by: Jack Gold
- Written by: Adrian Mitchell
- Based on: Man Friday by Adrian Mitchell; Robinson Crusoe by Daniel Dafoe
- Produced by: Gerald Green
- Starring: Peter O'Toole; Richard Roundtree
- Cinematography: Álex Phillips Jr.
- Edited by: Anne V. Coates
- Music by: Carl Davis
- Production companies: ABC Entertainment; ITC Entertainment; Keep Films
- Distributed by: Fox-Rank Distributors (UK); Avco Embassy Pictures (USA)
- Release dates: May 1975 (Cannes); March 5, 1976 (United States)
- Running time: 115 minutes
- Countries: United Kingdom; United States
- Language: English

Man Friday is a 1975 adventure film directed by Jack Gold and starring Peter O'Toole and Richard Roundtree. It is adapted from the 1973 play by Adrian Mitchell based on Daniel Defoe's 1719 novel Robinson Crusoe, but reverses the roles, portraying Crusoe as a blunt, stiff Englishman, while the native he calls Man Friday is much more intelligent and empathic. The film can be regarded as being critical of western civilization, against which it draws a contrasting picture of Caribbean tribal life.

== Plot ==
Friday and four of his friends arrive in a canoe on the island on which Crusoe has been stranded for years. When they start to consume a deceased comrade in a reverent form of ritual cannibalism, Crusoe kills Friday's friends and takes the latter to his camp as a prisoner.

Friday is very quick to learn the English language. Crusoe then tries to teach him Western concepts like property, sports, punishment, fear of God and so on, but Friday's reaction is only one of bewilderment and amusement. He begins to question and mock these concepts that seem senseless and destructive to him. One day he rebels, refusing to be a slave anymore. After some conflict, Crusoe has to admit that he could not live in solitude anymore, so he concedes in regarding Friday as a human being, although not as an equal. To do so, he starts to pay Friday one gold coin per day for his labour—an ambivalent sign of respect, as there is no use for money on the remote island.

When an English ship appears, Crusoe is overjoyed. Two men arrive in a boat and are invited for dinner but it turns out that they are slave traders who want to capture both Crusoe and Friday. So the latter collaborate in killing the intruders when their violent motives are revealed, and the ship sails away, leaving the protagonists stranded as before. For a while, a kind of friendship develops between Crusoe and Friday. Friday thinks that he maybe can teach Crusoe his more relaxed way of living, and not to be controlled by "thoughts of power, guilt and fear", which are very strong traits in Crusoe's personality.

One day, Crusoe falls back into his old delusions of being a superior being. He had been trying to teach Friday in a mock-up school for a while, ridiculously complete with a chalkboard. We see that the topic of the day, written on the chalkboard, is "civilization". Obviously, for Crusoe this is a culmination point, where his concepts are ultimately confronted with those of Friday. He gets in a frenzy and binds Friday to a pole, then holds a frightful, lunatic sermon about the superiority of his ways while threatening Friday with his gun. In the end, he shoots, but not at Friday, but at his own talking parrot, which had been his sole companion before Friday's arrival. After that shocking experience, Friday gives up his attempts to change Crusoe; the friendship also ends, leaving only the relationship of Crusoe as master and Friday as a paid servant.

After several years, Friday has accumulated 2,000 gold coins, the price that Crusoe once mockingly called for the hut and all his belongings. Friday now turns Crusoe's western ways against him. Catching him by surprise, he throws the gold on a table, declaring himself the owner of the material property; swiftly, he takes control of baffled Crusoe's gun, and coldly declares that the master-servant-relationship is inverted now. He forces Crusoe to build a solid raft, and both men put to sea for Friday's home island. When they have arrived there, Friday tells the story of their relationship to the gathered tribe, which reacts with astonishment and amusement about the strange ways of Crusoe. When the latter requests to join the tribe, proposing that he could teach the children, Friday strongly speaks against him, saying that "the only thing he (Crusoe) teaches is fear." So Crusoe is rejected and returns to his solitary island, where he commits suicide.

== Cast ==
- Peter O'Toole as Robinson Crusoe
- Richard Roundtree as Friday
- Peter Cellier as Carey
- Christopher Cabot as McBain
- Joel Fluellen as Doctor
- Sam Seabrook as Young Girl
- Stanley Bennett Clay as Young Boy (as Stanley Clay)

== Production ==
The film was based on a TV play by Adrian Mitchell which aired in 1972 as part of BBC's Play for Today.Colin Blakely starred.

Mitchell adapted this for the stage which premiered in London in 1973.

The film was one of the first financed by Lew Grade's ITC Entertainment. It was meant to be filmed in Hawaii but wound up shot in Mexico at Puerto Vallarta due to cheaper costs. There were two weeks of rehearsal then five weeks of filming in Mexico starting December 1974.

== Release and reception ==
The film premiered at the 1975 Cannes Film Festival, where director Jack Gold received a nomination for the Palme d'Or.

The film was recut without the involvement of director Jack Gold, with a more optimistic ending added. (The scene at the end in which Crusoe commits suicide was removed.)

Roger Ebert wrote in the Chicago Sun-Times that, "Instead of a story of survival, we get a metaphor in which everything in the movie has to serve the ultimate, and murky, meaning".

== See also ==
- List of American films of 1975
