= Goodnight Mister Tom =

1981 children's novel by Michelle Magorian

- First edition
- Author: Michelle Magorian
- Cover artist: Angelo Renaldi
- Genre: Children's historical novel
- Publisher: Kestrel Books
- Publication date: 1981
- Media type: Print (hardback and paperback)
- Pages: 304 pp (first edition)
- ISBN: 0-7226-5701-3
- OCLC: 9987640
- LC Class: PZ7.M275 Go 1981

Goodnight Mister Tom is a children's novel by the English author Michelle Magorian, published by Kestrel in 1981. Harper & Row published an American edition the same year. Set during World War II, it features a boy abused at home in London who is evacuated to the country at the outbreak of the war. In the care of Mister Tom, an elderly recluse, he experiences a new life of loving and care.

Magorian and Mister Tom won the annual Guardian Children's Fiction Prize, judged by a panel of British children's writers. She was also a commended runner-up for the Carnegie Medal from the British librarians, recognising the year's best English-language children's book published in the UK. (Note: Since 1995 there are usually eight books on the Carnegie shortlist. According to CCSU some runners up through 2002 were Commended (from 1955) or Highly Commended (from 1966). There were about 160 commendations of both kinds in 48 years, including three for 1981 (one highly commended).)

The novel has been adapted as a stage musical and as the film Goodnight Mister Tom (1998). In 2003, it was listed at #49 on the BBC's survey The Big Read. The most recent theatrical adaptation, Goodnight Mister Tom, won the Laurence Olivier Award for Best Entertainment.

== Plot ==
In September 1939, as Britain stands on the brink of the war, many young children from the cities are evacuated to the countryside to escape imminent German bombardment. William Beech, a nine-year-old boy from Deptford who is physically and emotionally abused by his mother, arrives at the village of Little Weirwold. Willie is timid, thin, and covered with bruises and sores. He also believes he is full of sin, thanks to his strict, religious, and mentally unstable mother. He wets the bed every day.

Tom Oakley is a reclusive and crabby widower in his sixties, with few friends and no family close by. William's mother wanted William to live with someone who was either religious or lived near a church. However, it is Tom who takes in Willie. Though initially distant, Tom is moved after figuring out the home life that William has endured, and treats him with kindness. William grows attached to Tom and his dog, Sammy.

William attends school and makes friends with George, twins Carrie and Ginnie, and especially with Zach, who has also been evacuated from London.

William learns to read and write with the help of Tom and others, and demonstrates a talent in drawing, painting and dramatics. As William is changed by Tom, so too is Tom transformed by William. It is revealed that Tom lost his wife and baby son to scarlatina (scarlet fever) many years earlier.

After a few months, William's mother writes that she is ill and requests that William return to her. Tom reluctantly lets him go. At first William looks forward to helping his mother and showing her his accomplishments. However she is annoyed to hear about his time away, as he has not been learning the Bible by rote and has been receiving gifts and attention from others. She shows him her newborn daughter, who is lying neglected in a box. Furious to hear about his association with the Jewish Zach and to hear William speaking up for himself, she accuses him of lying, theft and blasphemy and knocks him unconscious. William regains consciousness in the cupboard under the stairs, stripped down to his underwear, with his ankle twisted. He quietly sobs for Tom before falling asleep.

Around three weeks after William's departure Tom feels something is not right, as William has not written. He takes the train accompanied by Sammy into London and eventually finds Deptford and William's home. The house appears to be empty but Sammy is attracted by something inside. Tom persuades a local policeman to break down the door. They find William chained to a pipe in the cupboard with the baby girl, who has died. William is malnourished and badly bruised as he had been locked there for some time and needs to be hospitalised. While there he suffers horrific nightmares and is drugged to prevent his screams from disturbing other children's sleep. In the meantime Tom learns more about William's home life, including the fact that his late father was an alcoholic who had been violent towards Mrs Beech until his death a few years earlier.

A psychiatrist called Mr Stelton visits the hospital with the intention of placing William in a children's home. Tom is not happy about it, sneaks William out of the hospital and takes him back to Little Weirwold.

William remains bedridden for days afterwards and traumatised by his ordeal. He blames himself for the death of his sister, as he was not able to give her enough milk. Zach visits him daily. William grows stronger and visits his favourite teacher, Annie Hartridge. From Annie and Zach, William learns that he could not have fed a baby on his own and that a woman cannot conceive a child on her own. He realises his mother had sex outside marriage, despite telling him this was sinful. He no longer blames himself for his sister's death.

The authorities arrive from London to tell William that his mother has committed suicide. They want to take him to a children's home, as they have been unable to trace any surviving relatives who could take him in. Tom intervenes and (after much persuasion) is allowed to adopt William.

Tom, William and Zach then enjoy a holiday at the seaside village of Salmouth, where the landlady of their cottage mistakes William as Tom's son. After they return home Zach receives news that his father has been injured in a bombing on London. Zach hurries back to London by train. Not long after, they receive the news that Zach has died in an air raid.

William heals through his friendship with another recluse, Geoffrey Sanderton, a young man who lost a leg during the war and who gives William private art lessons. After Geoffrey shares a photo of his own best friend, who also died in the war, William begins to come to terms with Zach's death. William teaches himself to ride Zach’s bike. He realises that Zach will always be a part of him. William also grows closer to Carrie as they bond over Zach's memories.

One night, on returning home to Tom, William thinks back on how much his life has changed since arriving in Little Weirwold and realises he is growing up and that he now sees Tom as his father.

== Awards ==
- Commended, The Carnegie Medal 1981
- The Guardian Fiction Award 1982
- International Reading Association Award 1982
- Runner-up for The Young Observer Prize 1982
- Western Australian Young Readers Book Award 1982
