= Gillian Barge =

English actress (1940–2003)

- Born: Gillian Betty Bargh; 27 May 1940; Hastings, East Sussex, England
- Died: 19 November 2003 (aged 63); Ipswich, Suffolk, England
- Occupation: Actress
- Years active: 1959–2003
- Spouse(s): Clive Merrison (m. 2003)

Gillian Betty Merrison (27 May 1940 – 19 November 2003), better known by her stage name Gillian Barge was an English stage, television and film actress.

She was born in Hastings, Sussex. She started acting at the age of 17, training at the Birmingham Theatre School.

Barge's stage roles included The Cherry Orchard (as Varya), Measure For Measure (Isabella) and The Winter's Tale (Paulina). In 2001, she was nominated for a Laurence Olivier Theatre Award as Best Supporting Actress for her performance in Passion Play at the Donmar Warehouse. Gillian was also a member of the Royal National Theatre.

In addition to her theatre work, Barge has numerous television appearances to her credit. These include guest appearances on episodes of Pie in the Sky (1996), Lovejoy (1994), Midsomer Murders (2002), One Foot in the Grave (1990), All Creatures Great and Small (1980), Van der Valk (1977), Softly, Softly (1972) and also in the BBC Television Shakespeare production of King Lear starring as Goneril in 1982.

Her film credits include The National Health (1973). She portrayed Gertrude Bell in the TV movie, A Dangerous Man: Lawrence After Arabia (1990).

Her second husband was the actor Clive Merrison.

In 2003, she died aged 63 of cancer in Ipswich, Suffolk.

== Selected film and television roles ==
Film credits include:

- The National Health (1973) - Dr. Bird
- Seal Island (1976) - Warden's Wife
- Singleton's Pluck (1984) - Gwen
- Mesmer (1994) - Frau Mesmer
- The Discovery of Heaven (2001) - Onno's mother
- Charlotte Gray (2001) - Madame Galliot
- Love Actually (2003) - Cabinet Minister (final film role)

Television credits include:

- King Lear (1982) - Goneril
- A Dangerous Man: Lawrence After Arabia (1990) (TV) - Gertrude Bell
- One Foot in the Grave (1990) 'The Eternal Quadrangle as 'Mrs Doreen Mauleverer'
- Agatha Christie's Poirot - The Mysterious Affair at Styles (1990) - Emily Inglethorp
- Miss Marple: They Do It with Mirrors (1991) - Mildred Strete
- A Dance to the Music of Time (1997) - Mrs Erdleigh
- The Uninvited (1997) - Mary Madigan
- Doomwatch: Winter Angel (1999) - Cheryl
- The Ruth Rendell Mysteries - The Lake of Darkness (1999) (TV) - Mrs Urban
- Peak Practice (1999 episode: The First Stone) - Grace Longfield
- Anna Karenina (2000) - Princess Shcherbatskaya
- The Jury (2002) - Eva Prohaska / Juror No.9
- Midsomer Murders (2002 episode: A Worm in the Bud) - Hannah Harrington

== External links and references ==
- Gillian Barge at IMDb
- Obituary by Peter Gill
