= The House of Yes (play) =

1990 American play by Wendy MacLeod

- Original language: English
- Written by: Wendy MacLeod
- Characters: Mrs. Pascal; Jackie-O Pascal; Anthony Pascal; Marty Pascal; Lesly
- Genre: Black comedy
- Setting: A mansion in McLean, Virginia on Thanksgiving

Premiere
- Date: 1990
- Place: The Magic Theater, San Francisco

The House of Yes: A Suburban Jacobean Play is a play by Wendy MacLeod. The play premiered in San Francisco in 1990, and had its Off-Broadway debut in 1995; a feature film adaptation was released in 1997. The black comedy play follows the Pascals, a wealthy family in McLean, Virginia, and the conflict that ensues after oldest son Marty surprises the family with news that he is engaged.

== Synopsis ==
Marty Pascal and his fiancée Lesly return to his family's home in McLean, Virginia for Thanksgiving. He is received by his mother, younger brother Anthony, and twin sister "Jackie-O", who adopted her nickname and manner of dress as a result of her obsession with Jacqueline Kennedy Onassis. The news of Marty's sudden relationship and engagement shocks the family and destabilizes Jackie-O, who has recently been released from a psychiatric hospital. As the play progresses, it transpires that Marty and Jackie-O are involved in an incestuous relationship; their father left the family the day of John F. Kennedy's assassination, and as teenagers Jackie-O and Marty would re-enact the assassination as a form of ritualistic foreplay. The play concludes with Marty and Jackie-O again re-enacting the assassination, though Jackie-O intentionally uses a gun loaded with real bullets instead of the previously used blank cartridges, killing Marty.

== Development ==
MacLeod has stated that The House of Yes is about "people that have never been said no to," and that she wished to depict the "insularity I see in the upper classes, people who have cut themselves off from the rest of the world and are living by the rules they've invented." The play was inspired by a house MacLeod saw in a wealthy suburb of Washington, D.C., while its title came from a piece of bathroom graffiti seen by MacLeod that read "we are living in a house of yes." The subtitle of "A Suburban Jacobean Play" was inspired by the Jacobean drama 'Tis Pity She's a Whore, which similarly focuses on an incestuous relationship between a brother and sister.

== Production history ==
The House of Yes opened at the Magic Theatre in San Francisco in April 1990, before moving to the Las Palmas Theatre in Los Angeles in October of that year. The play was staged in London, England at the Gate Theatre on March 31, 1993, and off-Broadway at the Soho Repertory Theatre in January 1995.

=== Notable casts ===
Character	San Francisco/Los Angeles 1990	London 1993	Off-Broadway 1995
Mrs. Pascal	Nancy Shelby	Mary Ellen Ray	Allison Janney
Jackie-O	Celia Shuman	Deirdre Harrison	Jodie Markell
Anthony	Kenneth R. Merckx Jr.	Matt Bardock	Neal Huff
Marty	Art Manke	Jason Watkins	Chris Eigeman
Lesly	Susan Brecht	Dena Davis	Kim Soden

== Reception ==
The House of Yes received mixed to positive reviews from critics. Reviewing the 1990 Los Angeles production for The Los Angeles Times, critic Sylvie Drake called the play "funny, grotesque, impudent, a little chilling and streaked with satire," and favorably compared it to Death of a Buick and The House Across the Street. Drake qualified that the play was "tamer than expected, more struck with lunacy than danger," and that it was a "very San Francisco play, characterized by a healthy noncommerciality that may have a hard time surviving in the hothouse Hollywood jungle." In his review of the 1995 off-Broadway production of The House of Yes for The New York Times, Ben Brantley called the play "pretty familiar stuff, although deftly executed," noting that the plot is "so predetermined that it lacks urgency and menace."

== Film adaptation ==
A feature film adaptation of The House of Yes written and directed by Mark Waters was released in 1997. The film stars Parker Posey as Jackie-O, Geneviève Bujold as Mrs. Pascal, Freddie Prinze Jr. as Anthony, Josh Hamilton as Marty, and Tori Spelling as Lesly.
