= Wendy MacLeod =

American playwright (born 1959)

- Born: August 6, 1959 (age 67)
- Education: Kenyon College (BA); Yale University (MFA)
- Writing career
- Notable works: Slow Food (2015); Women in Jeopardy! (2015); The Ballad of Bonnie Prince Chucky (2014); Find and Sign (2012); Things Being What They Are (2003); Juvenilia (2003); The Water Children (1997); Schoolgirl Figure (1995); Sin (1994); The Shallow End and The Lost Colony (one-acts) (1992); The House of Yes (1990); Apocalyptic Butterflies (1987)
- Website: Official website

Wendy MacLeod (born August 6, 1959) is an American playwright.

== Life and career ==
MacLeod received a BA from Kenyon College in Gambier, Ohio, where she now teaches and is a playwright-in-residence. She earned a MFA from the Yale School of Drama.

Her works include the plays Sin and Schoolgirl Figure, both of which premiered at Chicago's Goodman Theatre and were directed by David Petrarca. Schoolgirl Figure was then optioned for film by HBO and Anvil Entertainment. MacLeod's The House of Yes premiered in San Francisco at the Magic Theatre and was the theatre's second-longest running show. It became an award-winning film by the same name in 1997, starring Parker Posey, which earned a Special Jury Award at the Sundance Film Festival. Other works by MacLeod include The Water Children, Things Being What They Are, Juvenilia, and Apocalyptic Butterflies. A pilot for Apocalyptic Butterflies was aired by the BBC as Nativity Blues in 1989, starring Alfred Molina.

Her play Juvenilia, a comic drama about college students "attempting to find love", premiered off-Broadway at Playwrights Horizons, as did her play The Water Children, both directed by longtime collaborator Petrarca, which has also been seen at Los Angeles’ Matrix Theater where it was cited as "the most challenging political play of 1998" by the L.A. Weekly and earned six L.A. Drama Critics Circle nominations. Things Being What They Are premiered at the Seattle Repertory Theatre and was then seen at Steppenwolf in Chicago in 2003 where its sold-out run was extended twice. The House of Yes has been performed at Soho Repertory Theatre, at the Maxim Gorki Theater in Berlin and at The Gate Theater in London, where it was published in Plays International. MacLeod's play, Find and Sign, premiered at Pioneer Theatre Company in Salt Lake City, Utah in 2012. Set in the New York City music industry (with a slight nod to Othello), Find and Sign is about a bumpy romance between an on-the-rise young record executive and an idealistic public school teacher.

Her critically acclaimed comedy Women in Jeopardy! premiered at Geva Theater in 2015, directed by Sean Daniels, and her play, Slow Food, was invited to the 2015 National Playwrights Conference. The play will be premiering at Merrimack Repertory Theater in January 2019. She has been a guest professor at Northwestern University’s film and theater departments. MacLeod's essay "Name Brand Nostalgia" was featured in The New York Times and her essay/talk "The Daily Struggle" was given as part of the Kenyon Review's "Writers-on-Writing" series in October 2016. Her prose and humor pieces have appeared in Poetry magazine, The New York Times, Salon, The Rumpus, McSweeney's Internet Tendency, The Washington Post, and All Things Considered.

MacLeod worked as the Executive Story Editor for Popular for the WB and wrote the pilot Ivory Tower, commissioned by CBS, produced by Brillstein-Grey (The Sopranos) and Diane Keaton, with actress Jeanne Tripplehorn. She served as the artistic director of the Kenyon Playwrights Conference which supported new work though its commissioning program and offered an intensive playwriting workshop taught by the artistic staff of partner companies including Playwrights Horizons, Steppenwolf Theater, Roundabout Theatre, The Old Vic, Royal Court Theater, La Jolla Playhouse, and ACT Theatre in Seattle.

== Family ==
She is married to K. Read Baldwin and has two sons: Foss and Avery Baldwin.

== Reviews ==
Women in Jeopardy!

- "A rollicking Women in Jeopardy! at Cape Playhouse", Boston Globe
- "Women in Jeopardy is Dangerously Funny in Walnut Creek", The Mercury News
- Theater Review: "Women in Jeopardy!", Rochester City Paper
- "Geva's Women in Jeopardy! highly entertaining", Rochester Democrat & Chronicle
- Apocalyptic Butterflies
- Review of Apocalyptic Butterflies, Chicago Sun-Times

Other

- More Plays by Wendy MacLeod
