= Denyse Alexander =

British actress (born 1931)

- Born: 28 June 1931 (age 95)
- Occupation: Actress
- Years active: 1958–2010
- Spouse: Jack Gold (m. 1957; died 2015)

Denyse Alexander (born 28 June 1931) is a British stage, film and television actress.

She was married to the film and television director Jack Gold from 1957 until his death in August 2015.

== Selected filmography ==
=== Film roles ===
- Orders to Kill (1958)
- The Medusa Touch (1978)
- The Sailor's Return (1978)
- Lady Jane (1986)

=== Television roles ===
- Inspector Morse
- Foyle's War
- Fawlty Towers (episode The Anniversary, 1979)
- Midsomer Murders (as Agnes Gray, episode: "Death of a Hollow Man", 1998)
- Dramarama
- Heavy Weather (TV film of Sir P. G. Wodehouse's book)
