= Michelle Magorian =

English author (born 1947)

- Born: 6 November 1947 (age 78); Portsmouth, Hampshire, England
- Education: Rose Bruford College
- Occupations: Writer, actor
- Writing career
- Period: 1970–present
- Genres: Novels, libretto, lyrics
- Notable works: Goodnight Mister Tom, Back Home, Just Henry
- Notable awards: Guardian Award; 1982; Costa Book Award; 2008
- Website: michellemagorian.com

Michelle Magorian (born 6 November 1947) is an English author of children's books. She is best known for her second novel, Goodnight Mister Tom, which won the 1982 Guardian Prize for British children's books. The novel has been adapted multiple times for screen and stage. Her other well-known works are Back Home and A Little Love Song. Magorian resides in Petersfield, Hampshire.

== Biography ==
Michelle Magorian was born in Portsmouth, Hampshire, and is of Irish descent, her father William Magorian being from County Down, Ireland She lived in Singapore and Australia from age seven to nine. As a child she spent as much time as possible in the Kings Theatre, Southsea.

Her ambition was always to become an actress. After three years of study at the Rose Bruford College of Speech and Drama, she spent two years at Marcel Marceau's L'école Internationale de Mime in Paris. From there she launched into a professional acting career and spent a few years touring all over the country - from Scotland to Devon and then Yorkshire - working in repertory companies, taking any part she could. Michelle's worst stage part was playing Orinoco in The Wombles musical. All this time she had been secretly writing stories. When she was 24 she became interested in children's books, and decided to write one herself.

The result was Goodnight Mister Tom. The idea for the book came from the colours in a song from Joseph and the Amazing Technicolor Dreamcoat. She thought of brown as an earthy, old colour and green as a colour of youth. The character of William Beech came into her head because she thought of a beech tree with its slim trunk and it gave her the idea for a slim young boy. Some details for the story came from her mother's tales about her time as a nurse in World War II. She took four-and-a-half years to complete it because she was also working in the theatre. After she had finished the book, she joined a novel-writing class at City Lit, at which she shared the book. It was published by Kestrel Books in 1981 and quickly became an international success. At home Magorian won the annual Guardian Children's Fiction Prize, a once-in-a-lifetime award judged by a panel of British children's writers and she was a commended runner up for the Carnegie Medal from the Library Association, recognising the year's best children's book by a British subject. (Note: Today there are usually eight books on the Carnegie shortlist. According to CCSU some runners up through 2002 were Commended (from 1955) or Highly Commended (from 1966). There were about 160 commendations of both kinds in 48 years, including three for 1981 (one highly commended).) She also won the International Reading Association Children's Book Award. The book was adapted as a film of the same name by ITV and aired in 1998; it has also been adapted as a musical.

Magorian followed Goodnight Mister Tom with Back Home (1984), another story about a child evacuated during World War II. Where Mister Tom featured a London boy living in the English countryside during the war, Back Home featured a girl struggling back home in Britain after five years with a family in United States.

A Little Love Song (Not a Swan in the US), her third novel, features a young woman becoming independent and finding first love in wartime Britain. Most of Magorian's other books are also set in the mid-20th century, often based around theatres. She has written four more novels—Cuckoo in the Nest (1994), A Spoonful of Jam (1998), Just Henry (2008), and Impossible (2014)—and two collections of poetry, a collection of short stories, and two picture books.

In 2007, she received an honorary doctorate from Portsmouth University.

Just Henry won the 2008 Costa Book Award in the Children's Book category.

== Works ==
- Goodnight Mister Tom (1981) (ISBN 0-7226-5701-3)
- Back Home (1984) (ISBN 0-06-440411-0)
- Waiting for My Shorts to Dry (1989)
- Who's Going to Take Care of Me? (1990)
- Orange Paw Marks (1991)
- A Little Love Song (1991) (ISBN 0-7497-1061-6); U.S. title, Not a Swan
- In Deep Water (1992)
- Jump (1992)
- A Cuckoo in the Nest (1994)
- A Spoonful of Jam (1998)
- Be Yourself (2003)
- Just Henry (2008)
- Impossible (2014)

== Filmography ==
Year	Film	Role
2011	Just Henry	writer (novel)
2001	Back Home	writer (novel)
1998	Goodnight Mister Tom	writer (novel)
1990	Back Home	writer (novel)
1980	McVicar	Secretary
1979	An Honourable Retirement	Loretta
1978	Lillie (TV series)	Cicely Courtneidge

== See also ==
Goodnight Mister Tom
