= List of roles and awards for Alan Bates =

Alan Bates awards and nominations
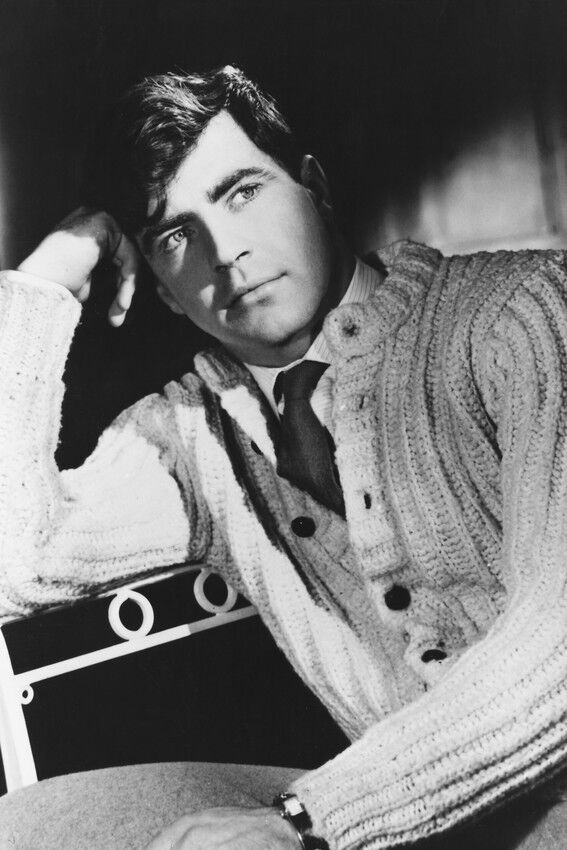
- Bates in the 1960s
Awards and nominations
| Award | Wins | Nominations |
| Academy Awards | 0 | 1 |
| BAFTA Film Awards | 0 | 3 |
| BAFTA TV Awards | 1 | 5 |
| Critics' Choice Movie Awards | 1 | 1 |
| Derwent Awards | 1 | 1 |
| Drama Desk Awards | 2 | 3 |
| Golden Globe Awards | 0 | 4 |
| Lortel Awards | 1 | 1 |
| Olivier Awards | 0 | 1 |
| Satellite Awards | 1 | 1 |
| Screen Actors Guild Awards | 1 | 1 |
| Tony Awards | 2 | 2 |

Totals (Note: Certain award groups do not simply award one winner. They acknowledge several different recipients, have runners-up, and have third place. Since this is a specific recognition and is different from losing an award, runner-up mentions are considered wins in this award tally. For simplification and to avoid errors, each award in this list has been presumed to have had a prior nomination.)
- Wins: 22
- Nominations: 17

English actor Alan Bates had a prolific career that spanned six decades across stage and screen, with several award-winning portrayals and defining interpretations. His parents were musicians, who encouraged him to pursue music. However, he felt compelled to pursue acting instead, and acquired a scholarship to the RADA in London. Among his fellow aspiring thespians were Peter O'Toole and Albert Finney—each of whom, along with Bates, would be Oscar-nominated by the end of the 1960s.

Bates made his stage debut in Coventry, in a play called You and Your Wife. After joining the Royal Court Theatre's repertoire for several Off West End plays, he soon made his West End debut in one of the quintessential "kitchen sink realism" dramas, John Osborne's Look Back in Anger—a role which he reprised on television. His portrayal of younger son, Edmund Tyrone, in Eugene O'Neill's classic Long Day's Journey into Night garnered him notice from the Clarence Derwent Awards. After some further TV work, he landed his (verified) film debut in The Entertainer (1960), starring Laurence Olivier, and co-starring, among others, Finney and the future Mrs. Olivier, Joan Plowright. It was the film debuts of the latter two as well. He succeeded this with breakthrough performances in Whistle Down the Wind (1961) and A Kind of Loving, the latter of which brought him his first BAFTA Film Award nomination.

What followed in the 1960s was a series of well-received performances in an eclectic array of films: reprising his role from the Harold Pinter play, The Caretaker (1963, a.k.a. The Guest); The Running Man (1963); Nothing but the Best (1964); and King of Hearts (1966). In between these were two of his most successful films thus far: Zorba the Greek (1964) and Georgy Girl (1966). The former obtained numerous accolades, including three Academy Awards out of seven nominations. The latter garnered four nominations from the Oscars; and six from the Golden Globes, including two for Bates: one for Best Actor in a Comedy/Musical Film and the other for Most Promising Male Newcomer. The following year, he received yet another Golden Globe nomination for Best Actor in a Drama Film for Far from the Madding Crowd (1967).

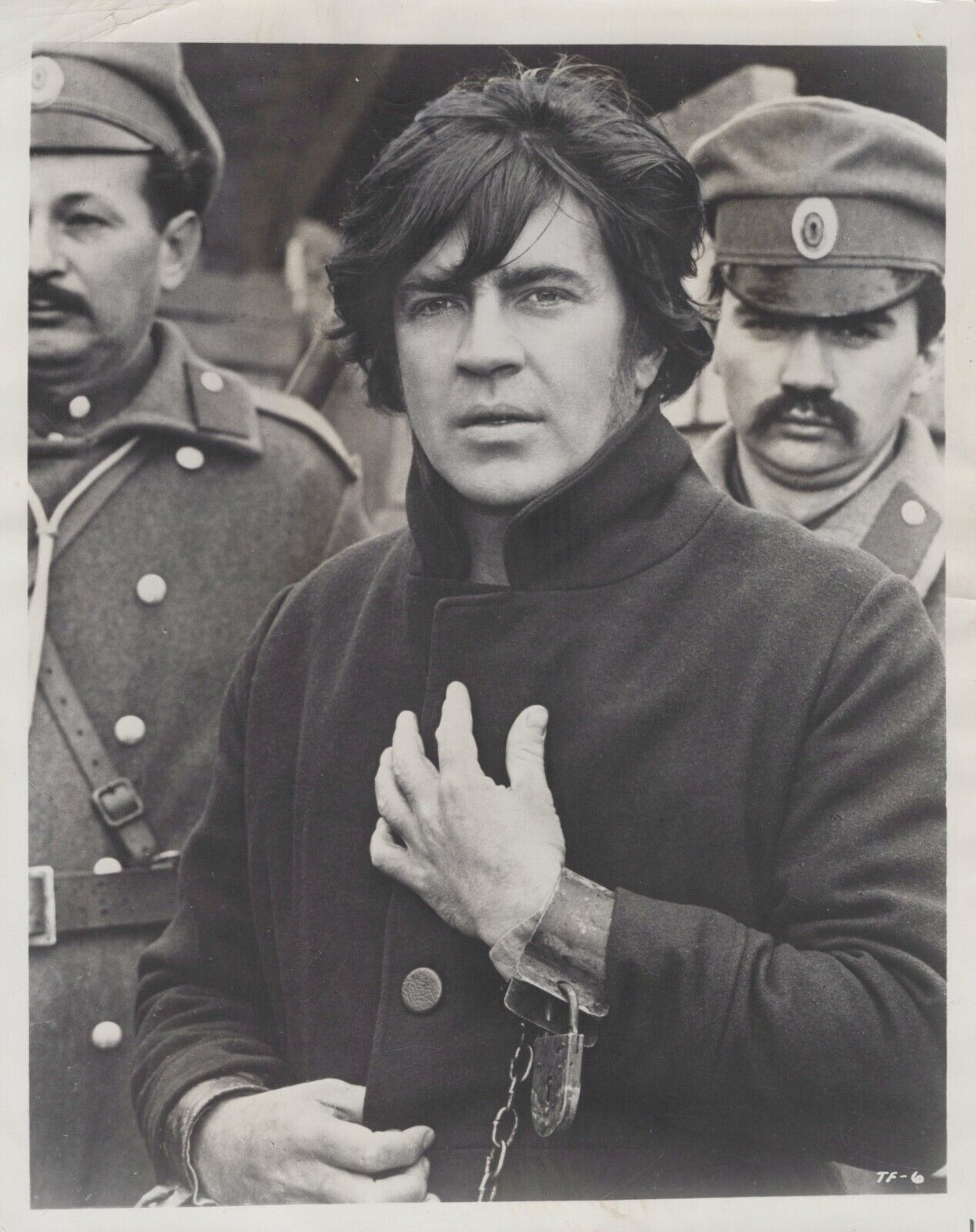
Bates in The Fixer (1968).

Come 1968, he would receive his highest set of recognition yet for The Fixer. He earned another Golden Globe (Best Drama Actor) nomination, coupled with his only Academy Award for Best Actor nomination, for his role as Yakov S. Bok (based on the real-life case of Menahem Mendel Beilis), a Russian Jew who was falsely accused of a blood libel murder. One year later, in Women in Love (1969), Bates and Oliver Reed achieved notoriety for an infamous homoerotic fireplace-lit wrestling scene, containing full-frontal nudity of both actors—which was groundbreaking for that taboo at that time. Bates earned his second BAFTA nom for that performance.

Within the next decade, the 1970s, Bates continued tackling a plethora of complex roles. One such role was in playwright Simon Gray's Butley (1974). Prior to its aforementioned film adaptation, the original 1971 play won Bates an Evening Standard Theatre Award in London that same year. Afterwards, it was swiftly rendered onto the Broadway stage—for which he won a Tony Award for Best Leading Actor in a Play, plus an equivalent Drama Desk Award and Drama League Award as well, in 1973. Other films of his from this era included The Go-Between (1971); A Day in the Death of Joe Egg (1972); In Celebration (1975), from David Storey—another in which he originated on stage; Royal Flash (1975); The Shout (1978), An Unmarried Woman (1978); and The Rose (1979). He was also involved with Lord Olivier's production of Three Sisters at The Old Vic, including the subsequent 1970 film adaptation, re-released as part of the American Film Theatre series (alongside Butley and In Celebration).

He also returned to television, including frequent anthology series guest roles such as in Play for Today (episodes: "Plaintiffs and Defendants" and "Two Sundays", for which he jointly earned a BAFTA TV Award nomination) and Great Performances (the Laurence Olivier Presents rendition of Pinter's The Collection); and the miniseries, The Mayor of Casterbridge (1978). Bates has described the latter as his personal favourite role. Meanwhile, from their success from Butley, the Bates/Gray collaborative duo cultivated their working friendship and relationship into continued creative output. Gray began writing plays with Bates specifically in mind, starting next with Otherwise Engaged (1975). This was another successful venture for Bates, whose performance was once again praised and earned him his first Variety Club Award in the UK.

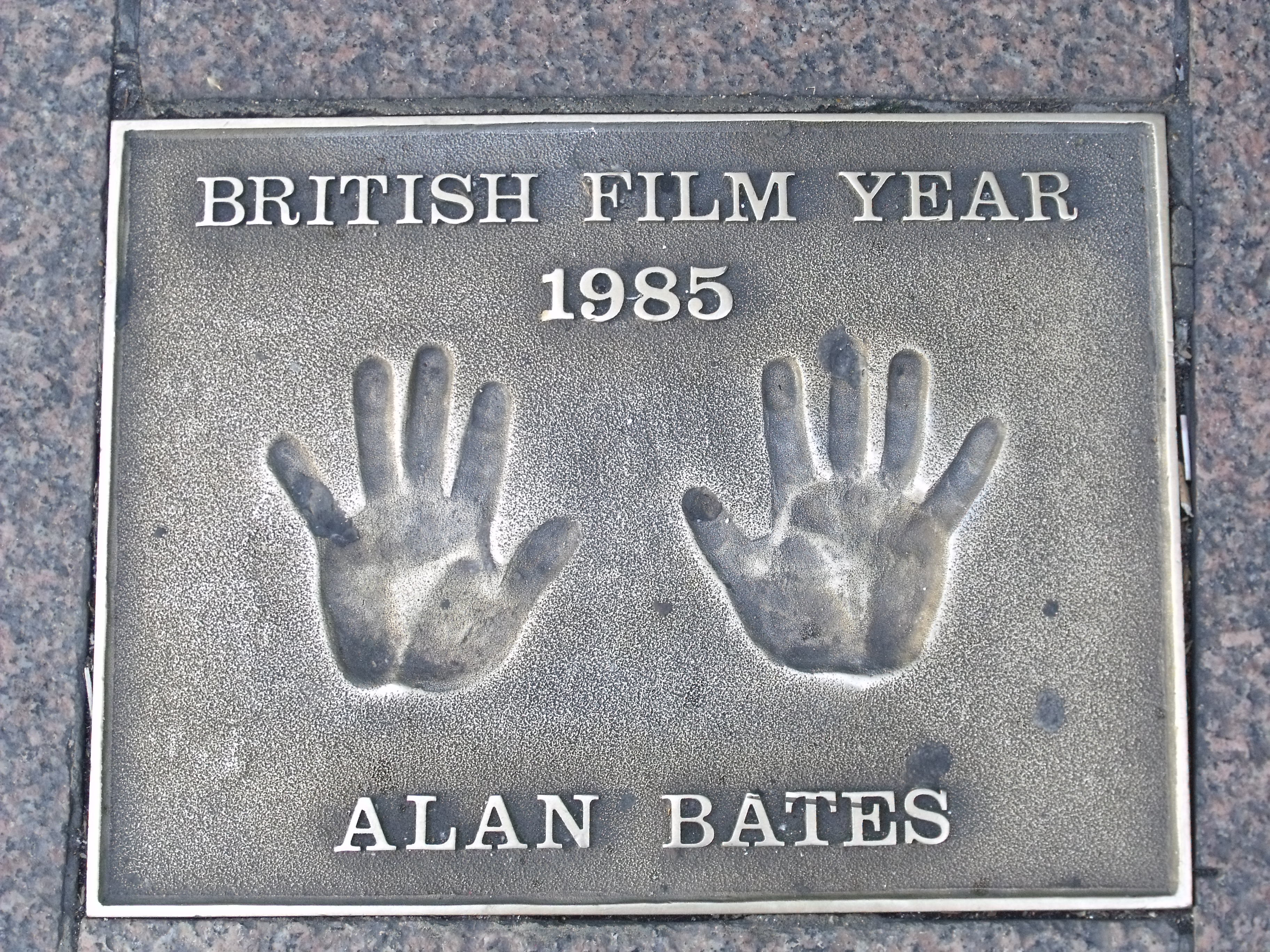
Bates's hand prints cemented in Leicester Square.

During the 1980s, his output tapered down. But his roles continued to bring him recognition. On television, he starred in a remake of Separate Tables (1983), as well as An Englishman Abroad (1983), Pack of Lies (1987), and The Dog It Was That Died (1989). "Abroad" would become his most decorated screen performance, including his only BAFTA (TV) win. His film work this decade included such films as Nijinsky (1980), The Return of the Soldier (1982), a cameo appearance in Britannia Hospital (1982), Duet for One (1986); and We Think the World of You (1988), in which he and Gary Oldman played lovers who were separated when Oldman was sent to prison, leaving Bates in charge of their German Shepherd. And in theatre, he reunited with Osborne, whose play, A Patriot for Me (1983) earned Bates his only Olivier Award nomination and a second Variety award win.

Sudden tragedy struck in 1990 when one of his twin sons, Tristan, died from a sudden asthma attack at age 19. Bates persevered, although his 1990s film output featured far less critical acclaim than in the previous decades. However, he still did receive another BAFTA Film nomination for Hamlet (1990) and another BAFTA TV nom for Unnatural Pursuits (1992). Other efforts include the television movie Nicholas's Gift (1999), based on the true story of Nicholas Green; the TV mini-film biopic on Marcel Proust, 102 Boulevard Haussmann (1991) (via the weekly anthology series Screen Two); the miniseries Oliver's Travels (1995); and the films, Mister Frost (1990) and The Cherry Orchard (1999).

He instead devoted more of his time to the stage. He and his surviving twin son, Benedick Bates, established the Tristan Bates Theatre. (Now known as the Seven Dials Playhouse.) His array of roles from Gray plays included Stage Struck (1979), Melon (1987), Life Support (1997)—and Simply Disconnected (1996), which was a sequel to Otherwise Engaged. Other theatrical ventures included fringe theatre at the Stratford Festival in Ontario of Richard III (1967); thrust stage performances at the Royal Shakespeare Theatre of The Taming of the Shrew (1973) as Petruchio; a one-man show entitled A Muse of Fire (1989); Poor Richard (1964); The Dance of Death (1985); Ivanov (1989) by Anton Chekhov (performed concurrently with Much Ado About Nothing, as his son's namesake, Benedick); Stages (1992) by Storey; The Showman (1993); The Master Builder (1995) by Henrik Ibsen; and Pinter's 1984 double-bill: One for the Road/Victoria Station.

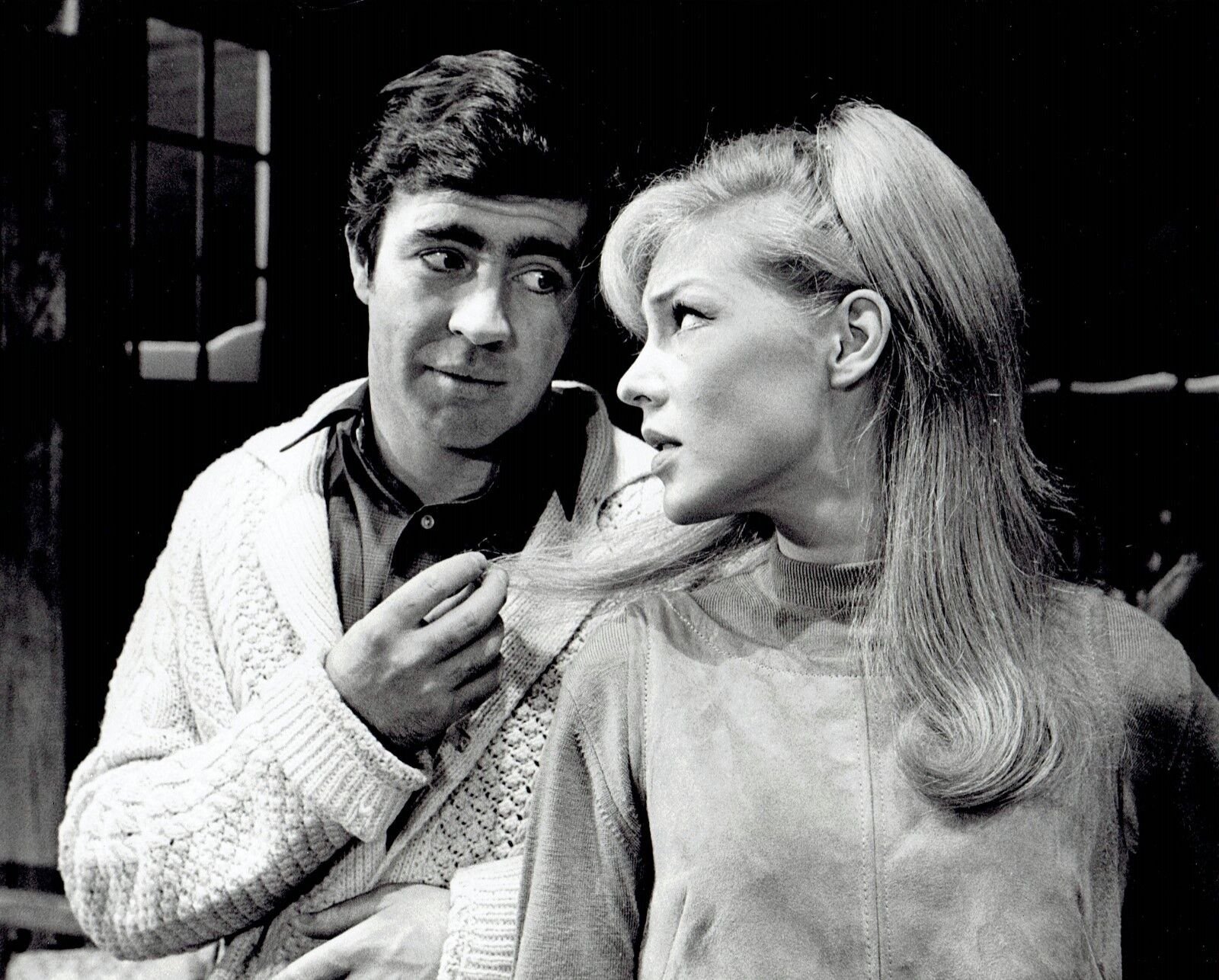
Bates & Joanna Pettet in Poor Richard (1964).

Prior to his death, Bates was working continuously. He was part of the vast ensemble of Gosford Park (2001), which earned seven Oscar nominations. It acquired many accolades as an ensemble cast, garnering him a number of prizes as a result, including a win at the Screen Actors Guild Awards for Outstanding Ensemble Motion Picture Cast. On television, he appeared in the miniseries Love in a Cold Climate, earning his seventh and final BAFTA nomination. He also received another Drama Desk Award nomination and was a Lucille Lortel Awards winner as lead actor, for the Off-Broadway play The Unexpected Man (2001).

The stage brought him one final triumph, with the play Fortune's Fool (2002). He took home a hat-trick of awards, winning the Outer Critics Circle Award in addition to both the Drama Desk Award for Outstanding Actor in a Play and the equivalent Tony Award, each of the latter for the second time. His final few films included Evelyn (2002); The Sum of All Fears (2002); The Mothman Prophecies (2002); and his final theatrical film, The Statement (2003), which was critically lambasted. His final work, a two-parter titled Spartacus (2004), was released posthumously. Just one year prior to his death, Bates was officially knighted by Queen Elizabeth II.

== Film ==
| Year | Title | Role | Notes |
|---|---|---|---|
| 1960 | The Entertainer | Frank Rice | Film debut. (Note: IMDb lists an "unconfirmed; uncredited" role as a play-within-a-film part of King Lear in It's Never Too Late (1956). However, there is no evidence to substantiate this claim on any other database as of yet.) |
| 1961 | Whistle Down the Wind | The Man (Arthur Blakey) | |
| 1962 | A Kind of Loving | Victor Arthur "Vic" Brown | |
| 1963 | The Caretaker | Mick | a.k.a. The Guest; Originated role on stage. |
| 1963 | The Running Man | Stephen Maddox | |
| 1964 | Nothing but the Best | James "Jimmy" Brewster | |
| 1964 | Zorba the Greek | Basil | |
| 1965 | Once Upon a Tractor | Joe Turrel | Short film. |
| 1966 | Georgy Girl | Jos Jones | |
| 1966 | King of Hearts | Sig. Charles Plumpick | |
| 1967 | Far from the Madding Crowd | Gabriel Oak | |
| 1968 | The Fixer | Yakov Shepsovitch Bok | |
| 1969 | Women in Love | Rupert Birkin | |
| 1970 | Three Sisters | Lt. Col. Aleksandr Ignatyevich Vershinin | Part of the American Film Theatre series. |
| 1971 | The Go-Between | Ted Burgess | |
| 1972 | A Day in the Death of Joe Egg | Bri | |
| 1972 | Second Best | Tom | Short film; also producer. Adapted from a D. H. Lawrence short story. |
| 1973 | Impossible Object | Harry | a.k.a. Story of a Love Story. |
| 1974 | Butley | Ben Butley | Originated each role on stage. Both films part of the American Film Theatre series. |
| 1975 | In Celebration | Andrew Shaw | Originated each role on stage. Both films part of the American Film Theatre series. |
| 1975 | Royal Flash | Rudi von Sternberg | |
| 1978 | The Shout | Charles Crossley | |
| 1978 | An Unmarried Woman | Saul Kaplan | |
| 1979 | The Rose | Rudge Campbell | |
| 1980 | Nijinsky | Sergei Diaghilev | |
| 1981 | Quartet | H. J. Heidler | |
| 1981 | Ręce do Góry | "Wikto" | a.k.a. Hands Up!; Self (1981 footage). Originally 1967 film, re-edited. |
| 1982 | Britannia Hospital | Macready: "Guest Patient" | Cameo appearance. |
| 1982 | The Return of the Soldier | Capt. Chris Baldry | |
| 1983 | The Wicked Lady | Capt. Jerry Jackson | |
| 1986 | Duet for One | David Cornwallis | |
| 1987 | A Prayer for the Dying | Jack Meehan | |
| 1988 | We Think the World of You | Frank Meadows | |
| 1989 | Force Majeure | Malcolm Forrest | a.k.a. Uncontrollable Circumstances. |
| 1990 | Dr. M. | Dr. Heinrich Marsfeldt / The Guru | Dual roles. |
| 1990 | Hamlet | King Claudius | |
| 1990 | Mister Frost | Det. Felix Detweiler | |
| 1991 | Secret Friends | John | |
| 1991 | Shuttlecock | Maj. James Prentis, V.C. | Also 2014 re-release a.k.a. Sins of the Father (w/ unused Bates footage) & 2020 Director's cut; both posthumous releases. (Note: A Director's cut edition of the film was released, using unseen footage, in 2020. This release was 17 years posthumously after the death of Bates in 2003.) |
| 1993 | Silent Tongue | Eamon McCree | |
| 1995 | Gentlemen Don't Eat Poets | Sir Hugo Coal | a.k.a. The Grotesque and/or Grave Indiscretions. |
| 1999 | The Cherry Orchard | Leonid Andreyevitch Gayev | |
| 2001 | Gosford Park | Mr. Jennings, the Butler | |
| 2002 | Evelyn | Thomas "Tom" Connolly | |
| 2002 | The Mothman Prophecies | Alexander Leek | |
| 2002 | The Sum of All Fears | Richard Dressler | |
| 2003 | Hollywood North | Michael Baytes | |
| 2003 | Meanwhile | Father Peter | |
| 2003 | The Statement | Armand Bertier | Final theatrical film. |

== Television ==
| Year | Title | Role | Notes |
|---|---|---|---|
| 1956 | Play of the Week | Cliff Lewis | Mini-film: Look Back in Anger; Originated role on stage. |
| 1959 | Play of the Week | Eddie Burke | Mini-film: The Square Ring. |
| 1959 | Play of the Week | Charles Tritton | Episode: "The Wind and the Rain". |
| 1959 | Armchair Theatre | Lewis Black | Episode: "The Thug". |
| 1959 | Armchair Theatre | Lost (Note: This episode, directed by Philip Saville and written by David D. Osborn, was never broadcast on television. Co-starring Sheila Allen and Joanna Dunham; it was deemed "too controversial" (due to the "unrepentantly" unmarried-and-pregnant aspect), and reportedly ordered to be destroyed. No copies are known to exist.) | Episode: "Three on a Gas Ring" (never aired). |
| 1959 | ITV Television Playhouse | Kenneth | Episode: "A Memory of Two Mondays". |
| 1959 | ITV Television Playhouse | Rikki Barofski | Episode: "The Jukebox". |
| 1960 | ITV Television Playhouse | Ralph Freeman | Episode: "Incident". |
| 1960 | Play of the Week | Peter Garside | Episode: "The Upstart". |
| 1960 | The Four Just Men | Giorgio | Episode: "Treviso Dam". |
| 1961 | Armchair Theatre | Mario | Episode: "Duel for Love". |
| 1966 | The Wednesday Play | Grigory Alexandrovich Pechorin | Mini-film: A Hero of Our Time. |
| 1974 | The Story of Jacob & Joseph | Narrator (voice) | TV film; (no additional role). |
| 1975 | Play for Today | Peter Gray | Episode: "Plaintiffs and Defendants". (Note: This episode was rebroadcast as an apparent encore in a compilation anthology series entitled Piccadilly Circus (1977). However, little verification seems to validate the existence of this program, other than its IMDb entry.) |
| 1975 | Play for Today | Charles | Episode: "Two Sundays". |
| 1976 | Great Performances | James Horne | Volume: Laurence Olivier Presents; Mini-film: The Collection. |
| 1978 | The Mayor of Casterbridge | Mayor Michael Henchard | Miniseries. |
| 1980 | Very Like a Whale | Sir Jock Mellor | Mini-film; a.k.a. The Executive Syndrome. |
| 1981 | The Trespasser | Siegmund MacNair | TV film. |
| 1982 | A Voyage 'Round My Father | Sir John Mortimer | TV film. |
| 1983 | An Englishman Abroad | Sec. Guy Burgess, MI6 | TV film. |
| 1983 | Separate Tables | John Malcolm / Maj. Gen. Pollock | TV film; dual roles. |
| 1984 | Dr. Fischer of Geneva | Dr. Alfred Jones | TV film. |
| 1985 | Summer Season | Inq. Nicolas | Mini-film: One for the Road. |
| 1987 | Pack of Lies | Stewart | TV film. |
| 1988 | The Ray Bradbury Theater | John Fabian | Episode: "And So Died Riabouchinska". |
| 1989 | The Dog It Was That Died | Agent Giles Blair | TV film. |
| 1991 | Screen Two | Marcel Proust | Mini-film: 102 Boulevard Haussmann. |
| 1992 | Screen One | Henry Sitchell | Episode: "Losing Track". |
| 1992 | Unnatural Pursuits | Hamish Partt | 2 episodes. |
| 1994 | Hard Times | Josiah Bounderby | Miniseries. |
| 1995 | Oliver's Travels | Oliver | Miniseries. |
| 1998 | Nicholas's Gift | Reg Green | TV film. |
| 2000 | Arabian Nights | The Storyteller | Miniseries. |
| 2000 | In the Beginning | Jethro | Miniseries. |
| 2000 | The Prince & the Pauper | King Henry VIII | TV film. |
| 2000 | St. Patrick: The Irish Legend | Calpornius | TV film. |
| 2001 | Love in a Cold Climate | Uncle Matthew, Lord Alconleigh | Miniseries. |
| 2002 | Bertie & Elizabeth | King George V | TV film. |
| 2002 | Salem Witch Trials | Sir William Phips | TV film. |
| 2004 | Spartacus | Marcus Vipsanius Agrippa | Two-part miniseries; final television role (released posthumously). |

== Stage ==
| Title | Role | Opening | Closing | Venue | Designation | Notes/Refs. |
|---|---|---|---|---|---|---|
| You and Your Wife | Toby | 31 Oct 55 | 29 Feb 56 | Albany Theatre, Coventry | repertory/stock | Stage debut. |
| The Crucible | Hopkins | 02 Apr 56 | 5 May 56 | Royal Court Theatre | Off-West End | Belgravia/Chelsea location. |
| The Mulberry Bush | Simon Fellowes | 02 Apr 56 | 5 May 56 | Royal Court Theatre | Off-West End | Belgravia/Chelsea location. |
| Look Back in Anger | Cliff Lewis | 8 May 56 | 27 Oct 56 | Royal Court Theatre | Off-West End | Belgravia/Chelsea location. |
| Cards of Identity | Mr. Stapleton | 26 Jun 56 | 09 Aug 56 | Royal Court Theatre | Off-West End | Belgravia/Chelsea location. |
| Look Back in Anger | Cliff Lewis | 05 Nov 56 | 07 Dec 56 | Lyric Theatre, London | West End | |
| Look Back in Anger | Cliff Lewis | 09 Dec 56 | 14 Dec 56 | Richmond Theatre | —N/a | |
| The Country Wife | Mr. Harcourt | 12 Dec 56 | 02 Feb 57 | Royal Court Theatre | Off-West End | Belgravia/Chelsea location. |
| The Country Wife | Mr. Harcourt | 04 Feb 57 | 13 Apr 57 | Adelphi Theatre | West End | |
| Look Back in Anger | Cliff Lewis | 01 Apr 57 | 07 Apr 57 | Golders Green Hippodrome | music hall | Barnet borough. |
| The Country Wife | Mr. Harcourt | 15 Apr 57 | 11 May 57 | Chelsea Palace Theatre | theatre-in- the-round | Demo: 1966; Reno: 2020. |
| The Apollo of Bellac | Mssr. Le Cracheton | 3 May 57 | 19 Jun 57 | Royal Court Theatre | Off-West End | Belgravia/Chelsea location. |
| Yes—and After? | Dr. Brock | 31 May 57 | 30 Jun 57 | Royal Court Theatre | Off-West End | Belgravia/Chelsea location. |
| Look Back in Anger | Cliff Lewis | 01 Oct 57 | 15 Mar 58 | Lyceum Theatre, Manhattan | Broadway | |
| Look Back in Anger | Cliff Lewis | 17 Mar 58 | 20 Sep 58 | John Golden Theatre | Broadway | |
| Long Day's Journey into Night | Edmund Tyrone | 15 Sep 58 | 20 Sep 58 | King's Theatre, Glasgow | proscenium arch | |
| Long Day's Journey into Night | Edmund Tyrone | 24 Sep 58 | 03 Jan 59 | Gielgud Theatre | West End | a.k.a. Globe; Theatre, until 1994. |
| The Caretaker | Mick | 27 Apr 60 | 29 May 60 | Arts Theatre, Westminster | West End | |
| The Caretaker | Mick | 30 May 60 | 27 May 61 | Duchess Theatre | West End | |
| The Caretaker | Mick | 04 Oct 61 | 24 Feb 62 | Lyceum Theatre, Manhattan | Broadway | |
| Poor Richard | Richard Ford | 02 Dec 64 | 13 Mar 65 | Helen Hayes Theatre | Broadway | |
| Four Seasons | Adam | 07 Apr 65 | 01 Jul 65 | Saville Theatre | West End | Defunct theatre; now cinema. |
| Richard III | King Richard III | 12 Jun 67 | 14 Oct 67 | Stratford Festival | fringe theatre | |
| The Merry Wives of Windsor | Frank Ford | 12 Jun 67 | 14 Oct 67 | Stratford Festival | fringe theatre | |
| Three Sisters | Lt. Col. Aleksandr; Vershinin | 04 Jul 67 | 26 Apr 69 | The Old Vic | producing house | A nonprofit & non-commercial; Waterloo location. |
| Venice Preserv'd | Jaffeir | 05 Feb 68 | 01 Mar 69 | Bristol Old Vic | repertory/stock | |
| Three Sisters | Lt. Col. Aleksandr; Vershinin | 29 Jul 69 | 31 Jul 69 | Theatre Royal, Brighton | proscenium arch | |
| In Celebration | Andrew Shaw | 22 Apr 69 | 21 Jun 69 | Royal Court Theatre | Off-West End | Belgravia/Chelsea location. |
| Hamlet | Prince Hamlet of Denmark | 11 Jan 71 | 31 Jan 71 | Cambridge Theatre, Camden | West End | |
| Hamlet | Prince Hamlet of Denmark | 01 Feb 71 | 01 Mar 71 | Nottingham Playhouse | repertory/stock | |
| Butley | Ben Butley | 05 Jul 71 | 10 Jul 71 | Oxford Playhouse | —N/a | |
| Butley | Ben Butley | 14 Jul 71 | 14 Oct 72 | Criterion Theatre, London | West End | |
| Butley | Ben Butley | 31 Oct 72 | 24 Feb 73 | Morosco Theatre | Broadway | |
| The Taming of the Shrew | Petruchio | 25 Sep 73 | 01 Jan 74 | Royal Shakespeare Theatre | thrust stage | Avant-garde adaptation. |
| Life Class | Alton Allott | 01 Apr 74 | 31 May 74 | Royal Court Theatre | Off-West End | Belgravia/Chelsea location. |
| Life Class | Alton Allott | 30 Jun 74 | 01 Oct 74 | Duke of York's Theatre | West End | |
| Otherwise Engaged | Simon Hench | 08 Jul 75 | 19 Jul 75 | Oxford Playhouse | —N/a | |
| Otherwise Engaged | Simon Hench | 21 Jul 75 | 26 Jul 75 | Richmond Theatre | —N/a | |
| Otherwise Engaged | Simon Hench | 30 Jul 75 | 02 Oct 76 | Sondheim Theatre | West End | a.k.a. Queen's; Theatre, until 2019. |
| The Seagull | Boris Trigorin | 01 Jun 76 | 02 Jul 76 | Derby Theatre | repertory/stock | Former Playhouse; Bates's hometown. |
| The Seagull | Boris Trigorin | 11 Aug 76 | 02 Oct 76 | Duke of York's Theatre | West End | |
| Stage Struck | Robert | 05 Nov 79 | 17 Nov 79 | Richmond Theatre | —N/a | |
| Stage Struck | Robert | 20 Nov 79 | 04 Oct 80 | Vaudeville Theatre | West End | |
| A Patriot for Me | Col. Alfred Redl | 6 May 83 | 02 Jul 83 | Chichester Festival Theatre | thrust stage | |
| A Patriot for Me | Col. Alfred Redl | 02 Aug 83 | 08 Oct 83 | Theatre Royal, Haymarket | West End | |
| One for the Road | Inq. Nicolas | 13 Mar 84 | 14 Apr 84 | Lyric Theatre, Hammersmith | provincial | Double-bill. |
| Victoria Station | Driver #274 | 13 Mar 84 | 14 Apr 84 | Lyric Theatre, Hammersmith | provincial | Double-bill. |
| A Patriot for Me | Col. Alfred Redl | 29 Sep 84 | 25 Nov 84 | Ahmanson Theatre | receiving house | |
| The Dance of Death | Capt. Edgar | 30 May 85 | 13 Jul 85 | Riverside Studios | fringe theatre | |
| Yonadab | Yonadab | 04 Dec 85 | 25 Jun 86 | Royal National Theatre: Olivier Auditorium | national | |
| The English in Italy | —N/a | 26 Oct 86 | 31 Oct 86 | Swan Theatre, Stratford-upon-Avon | theater-in- the-round | Royal; Shakespeare; Company readings. |
| The English in Italy | —N/a | 11 Nov 86 | 17 Nov 86 | Sadler's Wells Theatre | performing arts centre | Royal; Shakespeare; Company readings. |
| Melon | Mark Melon | 15 Apr 87 | 2 May 87 | Yvonne Arnaud Theatre | producing house | |
| Melon | Mark Melon | 18 May 87 | 23 May 87 | Theatre Royal, Bath | provincial | |
| Melon | Mark Melon | 23 Jun 87 | 12 Dec 87 | Theatre Royal, Haymarket | West End | |
| Ivanov | Nikolai Ivanov | 20 Mar 89 | 01 Apr 89 | Theatre Royal, Bath | provincial | |
| Ivanov | Nikolai Ivanov | 10 Apr 89 | 29 Jul 89 | Novello Theatre | West End | a.k.a. Strand; Theatre, until 2005. |
| Much Ado About Nothing | Benedick | 10 Apr 89 | 29 Jul 89 | Novello Theatre | West End | Bates's surviving twin son, Benedick, named after character. |
| A Muse of Fire | —N/a | 22 Aug 89 | 02 Sep 89 | Edinburgh Festival Fringe: Assembly Rooms | meeting hall | One-man show; compilation of various roles. |
| Stages | Richard Fenchurch | 12 Nov 92 | 26 Jan 93 | Royal National Theatre: Cottesloe Auditorium | national | a.k.a. Dorfman; Auditorium, since 2014. |
| The Showman | Bruscon | 11 May 93 | 26 Jun 93 | Almeida Theatre | producing house | |
| The Master Builder | Halvard Solness | 13 Oct 95 | 06 Jan 96 | Theatre Royal, Haymarket | West End | |
| The Master Builder | Halvard Solness | 13 Jan 96 | 24 Feb 96 | Royal Alexandra Theatre | proscenium arch | |
| Simply Disconnected | Simon Hench | 10 May 96 | 01 Jun 96 | Minerva Theatre, Chichester | black box theatre | |
| Fortune's Fool | Vassily; Semyonitch; Kuzovkin | 21 Aug 96 | 14 Sep 96 | Chichester Festival Theatre | thrust stage | |
| Fortune's Fool | Vassily; Semyonitch; Kuzovkin | 17 Sep 96 | 21 Sep 96 | Richmond Theatre | —N/a | |
| Fortune's Fool | Vassily; Semyonitch; Kuzovkin | 30 Sep 96 | 05 Oct 96 | Malvern Theatres | community theatre | |
| Fortune's Fool | Vassily; Semyonitch; Kuzovkin | 07 Oct 96 | 12 Oct 96 | Theatre Royal, Bath | provincial | |
| A Grand Knight Out | —N/a | 20 Jan 97 | 27 Jan 97 | Ustinov Studio | black box theatre | Variety show. |
| Life Support | J.G. | 09 Jun 97 | 14 Jun 97 | Yvonne Arnaud Theatre | producing house | |
| Life Support | J.G. | 17 Jun 97 | 21 Jun 97 | Richmond Theatre | —N/a | |
| Life Support | J.G. | 23 Jun 97 | 28 Jun 97 | Oxford Playhouse | —N/a | |
| Life Support | J.G. | 30 Jun 97 | 05 Jul 97 | Theatre Royal, Bath | provincial | |
| Life Support | J.G. | 30 Jul 97 | 18 Oct 97 | Aldwych Theatre | West End | |
| An Enormous Yes! | —N/a | 05 Jan 98 | 10 Jan 98 | Seven Dials Playhouse | amateur theatre | a.k.a. Tristan Bates; Theatre, formerly. |
| An Enormous Yes! | —N/a | 07 Jun 98 | 08 Jun 98 | Salisbury Playhouse | provincial | |
| Antony and Cleopatra | Mark Antony | 11 Jun 99 | 07 Oct 99 | Royal Shakespeare Theatre | thrust stage | |
| Antony and Cleopatra | Mark Antony | 09 Nov 99 | 13 Nov 99 | Theatre Royal, Newcastle-upon-Tyne | community theatre | |
| Antony and Cleopatra | Mark Antony | 13 Jan 00 | 06 Apr 00 | Barbican Centre – The Pit | black box theatre | |
| Timon of Athens | Timon of Athens | 01 Mar 00 | 04 Apr 00 | Barbican Centre – Theatre | performing arts centre | See also, play: The History of Timon of Athens the Man-hater. |
| Antony and Cleopatra | Mark Antony | 17 Apr 00 | 6 May 00 | Theatre Royal, Plymouth | receiving house | |
| The Unexpected Man | The Man (Paul Parsky) | 24 Oct 00 | 28 Jan 01 | McGinn–Cazale Theater | Off-Broadway | |
| Dorian Gray | Lord Henry "Harry" Wotton | 17 Jul 01 | 28 Jul 01 | Theatre Royal, Windsor | repertory/stock | |
| Dorian Gray | Lord Henry "Harry" Wotton | 31 Jul 01 | 11 Aug 01 | Yvonne Arnaud Theatre | producing house | |
| Fortune's Fool | Vassily; Semyonitch; Kuzovkin | 22 Feb 02 | 03 Mar 02 | Stamford Arts Center: Rich; Forum (Truglia Theatre) | performing arts centre | |
| Fortune's Fool | Vassily; Semyonitch; Kuzovkin | 02 Apr 02 | 21 Jul 02 | Music Box Theatre | Broadway | |

== Awards and nominations ==
| Year^{‡} | Awards Category | Title Role | Result | Ref. |
|---|---|---|---|---|
| 1960 | Clarence Derwent Awards; Best Supporting Male | Long Day's Journey into Night (Edmund Tyrone) | Won | |
| 1963 | British Academy Film Awards; Best British Actor | A Kind of Loving (Victor Arthur "Vic" Brown) | Nominated | |
| 1965 | Laurel Awards; New Faces – Male | Nothing but the Best (James "Jimmy" Brewster) | 7th place | |
| 1965 | Laurel Awards; New Faces – Male | Zorba the Greek (Basil) | 7th place | |
| 1967 | Golden Globe Awards; Best Motion Picture — Comedy/Musical Actor | Georgy Girl (Jos Jones) | Nominated | |
| 1967 | Golden Globe Awards; Most Promising Newcomer – Male | Georgy Girl (Jos Jones) | Nominated | |
| 1968 | Golden Globe Awards; Best Motion Picture — Drama Actor | Far from the Madding Crowd (Gabriel Oak) | Nominated | |
| 1969 | Golden Globe Awards; Best Motion Picture — Drama Actor | The Fixer (Yakov Shepsovitch Bok) | Nominated | |
| 1969 | Academy Awards; Best Actor in a Leading Role | The Fixer (Yakov Shepsovitch Bok) | Nominated | |
| 1970 | British Academy Film Awards; Best Leading Actor | Women in Love (Rupert Birkin) | Nominated | |
| 1971 | Evening Standard Theatre Awards; Best Actor | Butley (Ben Butley) | Won | |
| 1973 | Drama Desk Awards; Outstanding Performance | Butley (Ben Butley) | Won | |
| 1973 | Drama League Awards; Delia Austrian Medal for Distinguished Performance | Butley (Ben Butley) | Won | |
| 1973 | Tony Awards; Best Performance by a Leading Actor in a Play | Butley (Ben Butley) | Won | |
| 1976 | British Academy Television Awards; Best Actor | Play for Today: Plaintiffs and Defendants (Peter Gray) | Nominated | |
| 1976 | British Academy Television Awards; Best Actor | Play for Today: Two Sundays (Charles) | Nominated | |
| 1976 | Variety Club Awards; Best Actor | Otherwise Engaged (Simon Hench) | Won | |
| 1983 | CableACE Awards; Best Actor in a Dramatic or Theatrical Program (Non-Musical) | Separate Tables (John Malcolm / Maj. Gen. Pollock) | Won | |
| 1983 | Laurence Olivier Awards; Best Actor of the Year in a Revival | A Patriot for Me (Col. Alfred Redl) | Nominated | |
| 1984 | Variety Club Awards; Best Actor | A Patriot for Me (Col. Alfred Redl) | Won | |
| 1984 | British Academy Television Awards; Best Actor | An Englishman Abroad (Sec. Guy Burgess, MI6) | Won | |
| 1984 | Royal Television Society Programme Awards; Best Performance Award | An Englishman Abroad (Sec. Guy Burgess, MI6) | Won | |
| 1984 | CableACE Awards; Best Actor in a Dramatic or Theatrical Program (Non-Musical) | An Englishman Abroad (Sec. Guy Burgess, MI6) | Won | |
| 1984 | Broadcasting Press Guild TV & Radio Awards; Best Television Actor | An Englishman Abroad (Sec. Guy Burgess, MI6) | Won | |
| 1992 | British Academy Film Awards; Best Supporting Actor | Hamlet (King Claudius of Denmark) | Nominated | |
| 1993 | British Academy Television Awards; Best Actor | Unnatural Pursuits (Hamish Partt) | Nominated | |
| 2001 | Lucille Lortel Awards; Outstanding Lead Actor in a Play | The Unexpected Man [The Man (Paul Parsky)] | Won | |
| 2001 | Drama Desk Awards; Outstanding Actor in a Play | The Unexpected Man [The Man (Paul Parsky)] | Nominated | Refer below. (Note: BroadwayWorld erroneously listed Bates as having also won the Drama Desk Award for The Unexpected Man—and in the incorrect ceremonial year of 2000. However, it can be confirmed that Stephen Dillane won in 2000 for The Real Thing; meanwhile, Bates was indeed nominated, but lost to Richard Easton in 2001 for The Invention of Love.) |
| 2002 | Drama Desk Awards; Outstanding Actor in a Play | Fortune's Fool (Vassily Semyonitch Kuzovkin) | Won | |
| 2002 | Outer Critics Circle Awards; Outstanding Actor in a Play | Fortune's Fool (Vassily Semyonitch Kuzovkin) | Won | |
| 2002 | Tony Awards; Best Performance by a Leading Actor in a Play | Fortune's Fool (Vassily Semyonitch Kuzovkin) | Won | |
| 2002 | British Academy Television Awards; Best Actor | Love in a Cold Climate (Uncle Matthew Radlett, Lord Alconleigh) | Nominated | |
| 2002 | Screen Actors Guild Awards; Outstanding Performance by a Cast in a Motion Picture | Gosford Park (Mr. Jennings, the Butler) | Won | |
| 2002 | Critics' Choice Movie Awards; Best Acting Ensemble | Gosford Park (Mr. Jennings, the Butler) | Won | |
| 2002 | Satellite Awards; Outstanding Motion Picture Ensemble/Cast | Gosford Park (Mr. Jennings, the Butler) | Won | |
| 2002 | Online Film Critics Society Awards; Best Ensemble | Gosford Park (Mr. Jennings, the Butler) | Won | |
| 2002 | Florida Film Critics Circle Awards; Best Ensemble Cast | Gosford Park (Mr. Jennings, the Butler) | Won | |
| 2002 | Phoenix Film Critics Society Awards; Best Acting Ensemble | Gosford Park (Mr. Jennings, the Butler) | Nominated | |
| 2002 | Palm Springs International Film Festival Awards; International Filmmaker Award | —N/a | Received | |

- ‡The years referenced in the chart above denote when the particular awards ceremony took place—with each year linked to that particular annual ceremony whenever available. These years often do not coincide with the years of their works; most often, the release dates tend to be the year prior to the ceremony in question.

In addition to these cinematic awards, Bates was also inducted into two honorary statures for his services to drama, via Queen Elizabeth II:

1. Commander of the Order of the British Empire (CBE) in 1996.
2. Knight Bachelor (Sir) on New Year's Eve in 2002.

== See also ==
- List of European Academy Award winners and nominees#Best Actor in a Leading Role
