= Stealing Heaven =

- Original movie poster
- Directed by: Clive Donner
- Written by: Chris Bryant
- Based on: Stealing Heaven: The Love Story of Heloise and Abelard by Marion Meade
- Produced by: Andros Epaminondas; Simon MacCorkindale; Susan George
- Starring: Derek de Lint; Kim Thomson; Denholm Elliott
- Music by: Nick Bicât
- Distributed by: Rank Film Distributors
- Release date: 1988 (UK)
- Running time: 108 minutes
- Country: United Kingdom
- Language: English

Stealing Heaven is a 1988 film directed by Clive Donner and starring Derek de Lint, Kim Thomson and Denholm Elliott. It is a costume drama based on the French 12th-century medieval romance (a true story) of Peter Abelard and Héloïse and on a historical novel by Marion Meade. This was Donner's final theatrical film, before his death in 2010.

== Plot ==
Peter Abelard is a famous teacher of philosophy at the cathedral school of Notre Dame, and a champion of reason. At a time when academics are required to observe chastity, he falls in love with one of his students, Héloïse d'Argenteuil, a sixteen-year-old gentlewoman raised in a convent, who has both intellectual curiosity and a rebellious view of the low status of women in 12th-century Europe.

When the relationship is suspected, Heloise's uncle Fulbert, who had other plans for her marriage, works with the bishop of Paris to put a stop to it. Nevertheless, Abelard and Heloise pursue their relationship; they make love in her bed and also within a barn (they are overheard by a peasant girl when they come) and eventually have a child and later are secretly married. Abelard struggles with himself for acting against the will of God by loving Heloise. Her uncle takes a terrible revenge on Abelard for ruining Heloise's chances of an advantageous match.

== Cast ==
- Derek de Lint as Peter Abelard
- Kim Thomson as Heloise d'Argenteuil
- Denholm Elliott as Fulbert
- Bernard Hepton as Bishop
- Kenneth Cranham as Suger
- Rachel Kempson as Prioress
- Mark Jax as Jourdain
- Angela Pleasence as Sister Cecilia
- Timothy Watson as François
- Patsy Byrne as Agnes
- Victoria Burgoyne as Prostitute
- Philip Locke as Poussin
- Cassie Stuart as Petronilla
- Andrew McLean as Gerard
- Thomas Lockyer as Thomas
- Mark Audley as Luke
- Kai Dominic as Paul
- Miki Hewitt as Sister Claire
- Yvonne Bryceland as Baroness Lamarck
- Vjenceslav Kapural as Baron Lamarck
- Ivo Husnjak as Gaston Lamarck
- Jeremy Hawk as Ancient Priest
- Moniek Kramer as Jeanne
- Drago Mitrovic as Priest
- Zvonimir Ferencic as Bishop
- Eugen Marcelic as Astrolabe
- Lela Simecki as Sister Therese

== Production ==
The picture was filmed on location in Yugoslavia. Denholm Elliott had worked with Clive Donner before, having starred in Nothing But the Best (1964).

== Reception ==
Michael Wilmington of the Los Angeles Times called the movie "fascinatingly retrograde", as it "suggests the ‘60s: decade of turbulence, idealism, sex and riot." He notes that the director, Clive Donner, had made his best known films in that decade, such as The Caretaker (1963) and What’s New Pussycat? (1965). Wilmington is critical of the production and the characterizations and he objects to the omission of the couple’s important surviving love-letters, but he finds the actors easy to watch. "de Lint glows with dedication, Thomson tosses her great Cosmo cover-girl mane ravishingly. Elliott is a fine, squirrelly, sweating villain."

Caryn James reviewed the picture in The New York Times:

The wonder is not that Stealing Heaven ultimately fails, but that this relatively modest production comes so close to succeeding. Directed by Clive Donner with a small budget, an uneven script and a wonderful cast, Stealing Heaven at times seems like a poor cousin to The Lion in Winter crossed with Camelot and highlighted with steamy sex scenes. But overall, it is a serious telling of the story, suggesting the stateliness and rigidity of the world that the intellectual and sensual Heloise and Abelard resisted.

== See also ==
- List of historical drama films
