= That Uncertain Feeling =

That Uncertain Feeling may refer to:

- That Uncertain Feeling (film), a 1941 American comedy directed by Ernst Lubitsch
- That Uncertain Feeling (novel), a 1955 novel by Kingsley Amis
- That Uncertain Feeling (TV series), a 1986 British television adaptation of the novel
