= Janet Suzman =

British actress (born 1939)

Dame Janet Suzman DBE
- Born: 9 February 1939 (age 87); Johannesburg, South Africa
- Education: Kingsmead College
- Alma mater: University of the Witwatersrand
- Occupations: Actress, director
- Spouse: Trevor Nunn (m. 1969; div. 1986)
- Children: 1
- Relatives: Helen Suzman (aunt)

Dame Janet Suzman (born 9 February 1939) is a South African-born British actress who had a successful early career in the Royal Shakespeare Company, later replaying many Shakespearean roles on television. In her first film, Nicholas and Alexandra (1971), her performance as Empress Alexandra Feodorovna earned her several honours, including a nomination for the Academy Award for Best Actress.

Suzman later starred in a wide range of classical and modern drama as well as directing many productions in the UK and South Africa. Suzman appeared in A Dry White Season (1989), a film that examined apartheid.

== Early life ==
Janet Suzman was born in Johannesburg, South Africa, to a Jewish family, the daughter of Betty (née Sonnenberg) and Saul Suzman, a wealthy tobacco importer.

Her grandfather, Max Sonnenberg, was a member of the South African parliament, and her aunt was the civil rights and anti-apartheid campaigner Helen Suzman. Suzman was educated at the independent school Kingsmead College, Johannesburg, and at the University of the Witwatersrand.

== Stage career ==
After training for the stage at the London Academy of Music and Dramatic Art, Suzman made her debut as Liz in Billy Liar at the Tower Theatre, Ipswich, in 1962. She became a member of the Royal Shakespeare Company (RSC) in 1963 and started her career there as Joan of Arc in The Wars of The Roses (1962–64). The RSC gave her the opportunity to play many of the Shakespearean heroines, including Rosaline in Love's Labour's Lost, Portia in The Merchant of Venice, Ophelia in Hamlet, Kate in The Taming of the Shrew, Beatrice in Much Ado About Nothing, Celia and Rosalind in As You Like It, Lavinia in Titus Andronicus and her Cleopatra, magisterial, ardent and seductive, in 1973, which is said to have been a definitive performance. (An ATV/ITC television production, Antony and Cleopatra, was broadcast in 1974 in the UK and was shown internationally.) Although her stage appearances tended to run naturally towards Shakespeare and the classics, including Ibsen's Hedda Gabler, Chekhov's The Three Sisters, Marlowe, Racine, Gorky and Brecht, she also appeared in plays by Genet, Pinter, Ronald Harwood, Nicholson, Albee and others.

Suzman's Rosalind in As You Like It was recorded in a Marlowe Society production of the complete play.

== Films and television ==
She appeared in many British television drama productions in the 1960s and early 1970s, including Saint Joan (1968), The Three Sisters (1970), Macbeth (1970), Hedda Gabler (1972), Twelfth Night (1973), as Hilda Lessways in Clayhanger (1975), as Lady Mountbatten in Lord Mountbatten: The Last Viceroy (1985) and Dennis Potter's The Singing Detective (1986). Her first film role was in Nicholas and Alexandra (1972), and she was nominated for the Academy Award for Best Actress, the BAFTA and the Golden Globe for her portrayal of the Empress Alexandra. This was followed by A Day in the Death of Joe Egg (1972) opposite Alan Bates. In addition to the 1974 television version of Shakespeare's Antony and Cleopatra, she also appeared as "Frosine" in the BBC's Theatre Night 1988 production of The Miser opposite Nigel Hawthorne as "Harpagon" and Jim Broadbent as Maitre Jacques. Another role was that of Frieda Lawrence in Priest of Love (1981).

Suzman has made few films since, including Don Siegel's The Black Windmill (1974), Nijinsky (1980), Peter Greenaway's The Draughtsman's Contract (1982), Federico Fellini's E la Nave Va (And the Ship Sails On 1983), A Dry White Season (1989) with Marlon Brando and Nuns on the Run (1990; a rare comedic role). In 2020 Suzman appeared in the Netflix production of The Crown as the literary agent of Michael Shea, the queen's press secretary. The episode dealt with the rift between Buckingham Palace and Margaret Thatcher over the prime minister's refusal to back Commonwealth sanctions against South Africa. The episode also implied that Mrs Thatcher's stance might have been linked to her son Mark's business interests in South Africa.

== Later activities ==
In her native South Africa she directed Othello, which was televised, and Brecht's The Good Woman of Setzuan (renamed The Good Woman of Sharpeville) both at the Market Theatre, Johannesburg. She also toured her modern adaptation of Chekhov's The Cherry Orchard – a South African response entitled The Free State. She wrote, starred in and directed this piece with the Birmingham Repertory Theatre. Other productions with Suzman as director included A Dream of People at the RSC, The Cruel Grasp at the Edinburgh Festival, Feydeau's No Flies on Mr Hunter (Chelsea Centre, 1992), Death of a Salesman (Theatr Clwyd, 1993), and Pam Gems's The Snow Palace (Tour and Tricycle Theatre, 1998).

In 2002, she returned to the RSC to perform in a new version of The Hollow Crown with Sir Donald Sinden, Ian Richardson and Sir Derek Jacobi. In 2005, she appeared in the West End in a revival of Brian Clark's 1978 play Whose Life Is It Anyway? starring Kim Cattrall. In 2006 she directed Hamlet and in 2007 she played Volumnia in Coriolanus in Stratford-upon-Avon, for which she received excellent notices. In 2010, she appeared in Dream of the Dog, a new South African play, at the Finborough Theatre, London, which subsequently transferred to the West End. Suzman wrote Acting With Shakespeare: Three Comedies, a book based on a series of acting master classes.

In 2014, Suzman was criticised for comments regarding arts participation in the theatre. In response to a call by Meera Syal to engage in more diverse audiences, Suzman referred to theatre as "a white invention, a European invention. There is, in fact no archaeological evidence to indicate otherwise."

== Personal life and honours ==
In 1969, she married director Trevor Nunn and together they had a son. They divorced in 1986.

Suzman was appointed Dame Commander of the Order of the British Empire (DBE) in the 2011 Birthday Honours for services to drama.

Suzman holds honorary DLitt degrees from the universities of Warwick, Leicester, London (QMW), Southampton, Middlesex, Kingston, Cape Town, Edge Hill and Buckingham.

She is an Honorary Fellow of the Shakespeare Institute, and was awarded the Pragnell Award for lifetime services to Shakespeare in 2012. She is a patron of the London International Festival of Theatre.

== Awards and nominations ==
Year	Awards	Category	Nominated work	Result	Ref.
1972	Academy Awards	Best Actress	Nicholas and Alexandra	Nominated	
1972	British Academy Film Awards	Most Promising Newcomer to Leading Film Roles	Nicholas and Alexandra	Nominated	
1972	Golden Globe Awards	New Star of the Year – Actress	Nicholas and Alexandra	Nominated	
1972	National Society of Film Critics	Best Actress	A Day in the Death of Joe Egg	Nominated	
1973	New York Film Critics Circle	Best Actress	A Day in the Death of Joe Egg	Nominated	
1975	British Academy Television Awards	Best Actress	Florence Nightingale / Play of the Month: Hedda Gabler / Antony and Cleopatra / Second House: Athol Fugard	Nominated	
1977	Laurence Olivier Awards	Actress of the Year in a Revival	Hedda Gabler	Nominated	
1983	Laurence Olivier Awards	Actress of the Year in a New Play	Cowardice	Nominated	
2011	The Offies	Female Performance	Dream of the Dog	Finalist	

== Filmography ==
Year	Film	Role	Notes
1964	Festival (TV series)	Luciana	episode: The Comedy of Errors
1965	The Wars of the Roses (TV miniseries)	Lady Anne/Joan la Pucelle	chapter: Richard III chapter: Henry VI
1966	Lord Raingo (TV series)	Delphine	episode: Fear episode: Doubts episode Power episode: The Offer
1966	Theatre 625 (TV series)	Edith Swan-Neck/Mary	episode: The Family Reunion episode: Conquest: The Leopard and the Dragon episode: Conquest: The Encounter
1970	Solo (TV series)	Charlotte Brontë	episode: Janet Suzman as Charlotte Brontë
1971	Nicholas and Alexandra	Alexandra	
1972	A Day in the Death of Joe Egg	Sheila	
1968–1972	BBC Play of the Month (TV series)	Hedda Gabler; Lady Macbeth; Masha; Joan of Arc	episode: Hedda Gabler episode: Macbeth episode: The Three Sisters episode: St. Joan
1974	The Black Windmill	Alex Tarrant	
1974	Antony and Cleopatra (TV film)	Cleopatra	
1976	Clayhanger (TV series)	Hilda Lessways/Hilda Clayhanger	
1976	Voyage of the Damned	Leni Strauss	
1979	The House on Garibaldi Street (TV film)	Hedda	
1980	Nijinsky	Emilia Marcus	
1980	Escape (TV series)	Wendy Woods	episode: Banned
1981	Priest of Love	Frieda Lawrence	
1982	The Draughtsman's Contract	Virginia Herbert	
1983	And the Ship Sails On	Edmea Tetua	
1984	The Midsummer Marriage (TV film)	Sosostris	
1984	The Zany Adventures of Robin Hood (TV film)	Eleanor of Aquitaine	
1985	Bright Smiler (TV film)	Avon Eve	
1986	Masterpiece Theatre: Lord Mountbatten – The Last Viceroy	Edwina Mountbatten, Countess Mountbatten of Burma	
1986	The Singing Detective (TV miniseries)	Nicola	
1988	Theatre Night (TV series)	Frosine	episode: The Miser
1989	Revolutionary Witness (TV short)	Theroign de Mericourt	segment: The Woman
1989	A Dry White Season	Susan du Toit	
1989	4 Play (TV series)	Judith	episode: Nobody Here But Us Chickens
1990	Nuns on the Run	Sister Superior	
1992	Horizon (TV series)	Narrator	episode: Taking the Credit
1992	Leon the Pig Farmer	Judith Geller	
1992	The Secret Agent (TV series)	Margaret, Duchess of Chester	
1993	Inspector Morse (TV series)	Dr Claire Brewster	episode: Deadly Slumber
1997	The Ruth Rendell Mysteries (TV series)	Cecily Branksome	episode: Front Seat
2002	The Windsors – A Royal Family (Documentary)	Narrator	Originally released in 1994 by PBS, updated and re-released in 2002
2005	Hiroshima (TV film)	voice	
2006–2007	Trial & Retribution (TV series)	Winifred Morgan QC	episode: Sins of the Father
2008	The Color of Magic (TV film)	Ninereeds	
2010	Midsomer Murders (TV series)	Lady Matilda William	episode: The Sword of Guillaume
2011	Tinga Tinga Tales (TV series)	Ostrich	
2012	Sinbad (TV series)	Grandmother/Safia	episode: Homecoming episode: Queen of the Water-Thieves episode: Pilot episode: The Siren
2012	Labyrinth (TV series)	Esclarmonde	episode: Episode No. 1.2 episode: Episode No. 1.1
2012	Moominland Tales: The Life of Tove Jansson (TV film)	Readings	
2013	Felix	Mrs Cartwright	
2020	The Crown	Literary agent to Michael Shea	episode: Episode No. 8 Series 4 "48:1"
2023	Consecration	Mother Superior	

Reference: "Janet Suzman". IMDb.
