= Mister Frost =

1990 film by Philippe Setbon

- U.S theatrical release poster
- Directed by: Philippe Setbon
- Written by: Philippe Setbon; Derry Hall; Brad Lynch; Louise Vincent
- Starring: Jeff Goldblum; Kathy Baker; Alan Bates
- Edited by: Ray Lovejoy
- Music by: Steve Levine
- Production companies: SVS, Inc.
- Distributed by: Blue Dolphin Film Distribution (United Kingdom); Acteurs Auteurs Associés (France)
- Release date: 9 November 1990
- Running time: 104 minutes
- Countries: United Kingdom; France
- Language: English

Mister Frost, also known as The Deadly Mr. Frost, is a 1990 supernatural thriller film starring Jeff Goldblum and directed by French filmmaker Philippe Setbon, who co-wrote the screenplay with Derry Hall, Brad Lynch and Louise Vincent. It co-starred Kathy Baker and Alan Bates.

== Synopsis ==
A police detective named Felix Detweiler visits the palatial English estate of Mister Frost, whose first name is never given, to investigate a report of a dead body. Frost, with very little prompting, cheerfully admits that he has many bodies buried in his yard.

Frost is arrested and ultimately placed in an asylum located in France. During this time the police are unable to establish his identity. The detective leaves his job and becomes obsessed with Frost and the 24 corpses dug up from his garden.

After not speaking for two years after his arrest, Frost's long silence is broken when he encounters Sarah Day, a doctor at the asylum. Frost refuses to speak with anyone but her, then tells Day that he is, in fact, Satan. He reveals that he plans to goad her into murdering him. He tells her that he wants to show the world that he does exist, and that modern science has tried to push him into the background, and that he will "set things right."

Detweiler believes it is true that Frost is "the devil himself" and pleads with the doctor to heed his warnings. Day naturally does not accept this, but strange things begin to happen around her and Frost demonstrates on multiple occasions feats that would be difficult to dismiss as simple sleight of hand.

The turning point for Day comes when her brother, after being using a wheelchair for most of his life, suddenly regains use of his legs. Her patients and colleagues also begin to exhibit unnatural changes in themselves. Gradually, Day is convinced that Frost is telling the truth and, to spare others from harm, agrees to kill him.

Moments before she shoots him to death, Frost tells Day that he now knows he is more powerful than anything or anyone in the world, and he thanks Day for believing in him. As Frost expounds on this, Day shoots him. For a moment she looks blankly at the body before saying, with Frost's voice, "Stronger than passing time." As Day is led away by the police, Detweiler arrives. Day refuses to speak, arousing Detweiler's suspicion, and the film ends.

== Cast ==
- Jeff Goldblum as Mister Frost
- Kathy Baker as Dr. Sarah Day
- Alan Bates as Felix Detweiler
- Jean-Pierre Cassel as Inspector Carelli
- Roland Giraud as Dr. Reynhardt
- François Négret as Christopher
- Vincent Schiavelli as Angelo
- Charley Boorman as Thief # 1

== Release ==
In the Netherlands, the film has been released on DVD by distributor Dutch Film Works.

== Reception ==
While not a hit, Mister Frost was generally reviewed well. The film occasionally appears on television.
