= That Uncertain Feeling (TV series) =

Uncertain Feeling - Drama

- Genre: Comedy drama
- Based on: That Uncertain Feeling by Kingsley Amis
- Written by: Ewart Alexander
- Directed by: Robert Chetwyn
- Starring: Denis Lawson; Sheila Gish; Brenda Blethyn
- Country of origin: United Kingdom
- Original language: English
- No. of series: 1
- No. of episodes: 4

Production
- Producers: Victor Glynn; Peter Edwards
- Running time: 50 minutes
- Production companies: BBC Wales; Quintet Films

Original release
- Network: BBC Two
- Release: 12 March – 2 April 1986

That Uncertain Feeling is a four-part British comedy drama television series that originally aired on BBC 2 in 1986. It is based on the 1955 novel of the same title by Kingsley Amis about a married Welsh librarian's entanglement with a sophisticated woman. The story had previously been made into the 1962 film Only Two Can Play. Gish went on to star in another Amis adaptation Stanley and the Women in 1991.

== Main cast ==
- Denis Lawson as John Aneurin Lewis
- Sheila Gish as Elizabeth Gruffydd-Williams
- Brenda Blethyn as Jean Lewis
- Miles Anderson as Paul Whetstone
- Ann Beach as Mrs Davies
- Philip Bowen as Bill Evans
- David Calder as Vernon Gruffydd-Williams
- Richard Davies as Mr Davis
- Davyd Harries as Mervyn the dentist
- Arbel Jones as Margot John
- Alison Matthews as Eira Lewis
- Neil McCaul as Gareth Probert
- Gary Meredith as Stan John
- Sharon Morgan as Dentist's mistress
- Gareth Potter as Ken Davies
- Albert Welling as Theo James
- Lowri Ann Richards as Dilys
- Hugh Thomas as Ieuan Jenkins

== Bibliography ==
- Lawrence Goldman. Oxford Dictionary of National Biography 2005–2008. OUP Oxford, 2013.
