= Marion Meade =

American novelist (1934–2022)

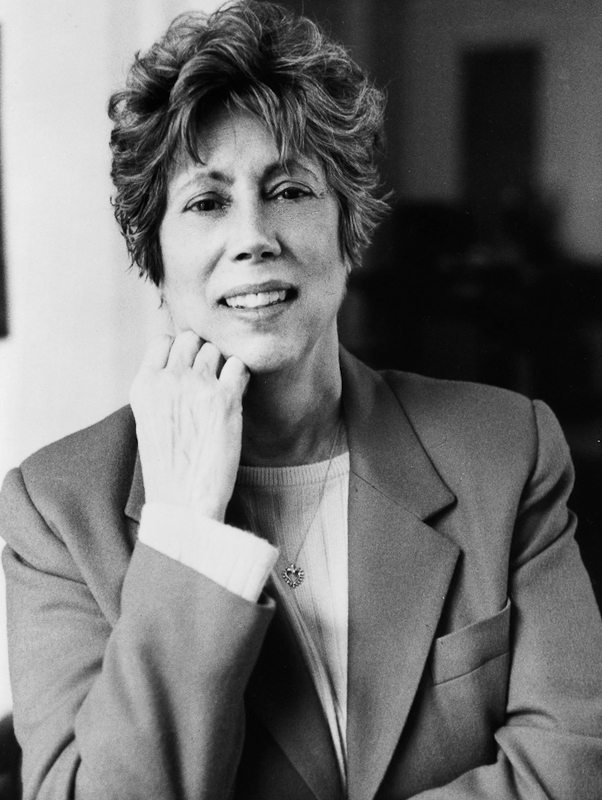
- Meade in 2009
- Born: January 7, 1934; Pittsburgh, Pennsylvania, U.S.
- Died: December 29, 2022 (aged 88); New York City, U.S.
- Occupations: Writer, novelist
- Writing career
- Genre: Biography
- Notable work: Dorothy Parker: What Fresh Hell Is This?

Marion Meade (born Marion Lolita Sidhu; January 7, 1934 – December 29, 2022) was an American biographer and novelist. She was best known for her portraits of writers and filmmakers.

== Biography ==
Born in Pittsburgh, the eldest of three children, Meade grew up in an academic environment. Her father, Surain Singh Sidhu, a Sikh immigrant from Amritsar, India, taught physics at the University of Pittsburgh and later worked at the Argonne National Laboratory. Her mother Mary, a Hungarian-American, was a homemaker whose hobbies included writing song lyrics and raising orchids. Meade first became interested in journalism while attending Bethel Township High School where she edited the school paper and worked summers on a local newspaper.

Meade studied journalism at Northwestern University, graduating in 1955. The following year she moved to New York, earned a master's degree from the Columbia Graduate School of Journalism, and found her first reporting job as an assistant to Earl Wilson, the popular Broadway columnist for the New York Post. She subsequently worked for publications in New York and Washington before becoming a freelancer and publishing articles in The New York Times, The Nation, The New Republic and McCall's.

Meade’s first book, Bitching, published in 1973, stemmed from her involvement in the women’s liberation movement of the 1960s. Following her participation in feminist consciousness-raising groups, she asked women of various ages how they secretly regarded the men in their lives. The result was a less than favorable review of the opposite sex.

Following Bitching, Meade wrote a trilogy of feminist-themed works set in medieval France. Eleanor of Aquitaine chronicles the life of the powerful 12th-century queen. Stealing Heaven: The Love Story of Heloise and Abelard retells one of the most famous love stories of European history (a film adaptation of the novel was released in 1988). A second novel, Sybille, concerns the death of literature during the Albigensian Crusade and a 13th-century troubadour grappling with her verse as her homeland collapses.

In 1988, Meade published the biography Dorothy Parker: What Fresh Hell Is This?, which remains an authoritative source of the author's life and work. New interest in Parker led to the making of the 1994 film Mrs. Parker and the Vicious Circle, starring Jennifer Jason Leigh. Meade further explored Parker in her 2004 book Bobbed Hair and Bathtub Gin: Writers Running Wild in the Twenties. The work covered three other notable female writers of the Jazz Age—Edna St. Vincent Millay, Zelda Fitzgerald, and Edna Ferber. Both the San Francisco Chronicle and The Washington Post named it among the best books of the year., Kirkus Reviews called it "largely apocryphal and hardly scholarly, but a lot of fun." In 2006 Meade edited Parker’s collected works, The Portable Dorothy Parker, updating the 60-year-old anthology with fresh material and many personal letters. Penguin Books commissioned a jacket from the illustrator Seth.

Her 1995 HarperCollins book Buster Keaton: Cut to the Chase recorded the journey of Keaton from a Kansas medicine show to vaudeville headliner to cinematic pioneer. Her 2000 biography The Unruly Life of Woody Allen was, The New York Times said, "not a vile book" and "not irresponsible" but did adhere to the standard "consensus of opinion on its subject, depicting him as self-involved, misogynist, egotistical, inconsiderate, isolated and stagnant."

Her 2010 book Lonelyhearts paired Nathanael West with Eileen McKenney. It received critical reviews in The Washington Post and The New York Times, which criticized its "grating prose" and "half-baked analogies." It was also noted that West had been profiled just a few years before. National Public Radio reviewed the book positively.

In 2014, she published her final book, examining the end of Dorothy Parker's life and the vicissitudes of her bodily remains.

Meade lived in New York City. She was married three times, to Charles Meade, Forbes Linkhorn and Milton Viorst. She had one child, Alison Sprague, and two granddaughters, Ashley Elizabeth Sprague and Katharine Rose Sprague.

Meade died on December 29, 2022, at her apartment on the Upper West Side of Manhattan. She was 88 years old.

== Professional approach ==
Meade stated in a 2006 interview:

Biography was traditionally written by people who had lots of money and didn’t have to do anything. Or—when I first started out—by academics. Most of these people had very strict rules for what they thought was appropriate for a biography. They thought you had to be very circumspect. You couldn’t really pry into a subject’s life, which to me sounds insane, because that is what I do: pry into people’s lives. So I am perfect for what biography has become today because there is nothing I wouldn’t investigate. That is the way biography has changed in the last 20 years. It was a kind of white glove type of writing, now it’s anything goes.

== Works ==
Biographies

- Free Woman: The Life and Times of Victoria Woodhull (1976)
- Eleanor of Aquitaine (1977)
- Madame Blavatsky: The Woman Behind the Myth (1980)
- Dorothy Parker: What Fresh Hell Is This? (1988)
- Buster Keaton: Cut to the Chase (1995)
- The Unruly Life of Woody Allen (2000)
- Bobbed Hair and Bathtub Gin: Writers Running Wild in the Twenties (2004)
- Lonelyhearts: The Screwball World of Nathanael West and Eileen McKenney (2010)
- The Last Days of Dorothy Parker (2014)

Novels

- Stealing Heaven: The Love Story of Heloise and Abelard (1979), filmed as Stealing Heaven (1988)
- Sybille (1983)

Narrative nonfiction

- Bitching (1973)

Editor/forewords

- A Journey into Dorothy Parker’s New York by Kevin C. Fitzpatrick (foreword) (2005)
- The Portable Dorothy Parker (editor, foreword) (2006)
- The Ladies of the Corridor by Dorothy Parker and Arnaud D’Usseau (editor, foreword) (2008)
- Complete Poems by Dorothy Parker (foreword) (2010)
- Alpine Giggle Week by Dorothy Parker (editor, foreword) (2014)

Selected articles

- "Estate of Mind: Dorothy Parker willed her copyright to the NAACP—an organization her executor, Lillian Hellman, detested," Bookforum, (April/May 2006)
- "Close to Home," American Theatre (April 2008)

Films and documentaries

- Stealing Heaven (adapted from novel) (1988)
- Would You Kindly Direct Me to Hell? The Infamous Dorothy Parker (1994)
