= Lord Raingo =

1926 novel by Arnold Bennett

- Title page for Lord Raingo (1926)
- Author: Arnold Bennett
- Language: English
- Publication date: 1926
- Publication place: United Kingdom

Lord Raingo is a novel by British novelist Arnold Bennett, published in 1926.

== Summary ==
The plot summary, as detailed in a 1927 edition of the Crawfordsville Review, explains it as a detailed drawing of the character of a middle-aged English millionaire, who is made Minister of Records and raised to the peerage.

== Promotion ==
The novel was published as a serial in the London Evening Standard and was heavily promoted within this newspaper and the Daily Express, both then owned by Lord Beaverbrook. As part of the story, readers were asked to surmise on the identity of the fictional character Lord Raingo and which person he was based upon. Newspapers reviewing the work, such as The Age, suggested that the character was based on the late Lord Rhondda, noting the "striking resemblances" between the two businessmen, who each "became millionaires before taking a prominent part in public life". In September 1926, a week prior to the first instalment, the Evening Standard promoted the novel on their front page with a suggestion that discussions would arise from surmising who the real identity of Lord Raingo is. The paper believed this may also raise a question of "literary ethics" and encouraged readers to make their own determinations as to whether the character was a real person, or a fictional character based on a real person.

== Reception ==
The novel was praised by the Montreal Gazette, who described it as a great novel which "is thoroughly readable" and "an excellent satire on the spirit and methods of modern politics". Likewise, a writer for the Hartford Courant praised the work, particularly highlighting the sick-room scenes, which were described as ranking among "the best work ever achieved by Mr Bennett", commenting on how they believed the scenes were faithful to reality. In contrast, it was criticised in an entry to the Daily Mail by Lord Birkenhead. Upon reading the critique, Bennett hurriedly started to prepare a response letter, at which point his secretary advised him that the newspaper had requested a response from Bennett. Lord Birkenhead expressed concern that Bennett was using real people within his novels, to which Bennett responded that he had discounted this suggestion numerous times already, stating that "If a novelist is entitled to deal with modern politics, then in order to obtain verisimilitude he must devise, for some of his personages, individuals who bear some resemblance to individuals in real life". Bennett charged the paper a £60 sum for his response.

== Television adaptation ==
The novel was adapted into a 1966 British TV series, which ran for 4 episodes across April to May on BBC2, starring Kenneth More, Janet Suzman and Joss Ackland. It was the first of several mini series Kenneth More made for the BBC, later ones including The Forsyte Saga and The White Rabbit.

=== Reception ===
The series was praised by The Guardian for its "strong story and extraordinarily interesting characters." The Observer said, "you really want to know what happens next."
