= Confusions =

1974 play by Alan Ayckbourn

Confusions is a play by Alan Ayckbourn consisting of a series of five interconnected one-act plays. It was first staged in 1974 (1976 at London's Apollo Theatre starring Pauline Collins, John Alderton, Sheila Gish, Derek Fowlds and James Cossins) and played by just five actors. The scenes are all loosely linked by characters or locations, but more subtly through the common underlying themes of obsession, isolation and human desire for companionship.

== Summary of the Five One-Act Plays ==
1. "Mother Figure": Housewife Lucy has the difficult job of looking after the children alone whilst her husband is away. This job of looking after the children has taken over her life; so much so that she never leaves the house and doesn't even have the time to change out of her pyjamas. Concerned neighbour Rosemary decides to come around to check on Lucy and to give her the number of her husband Harry who has been trying to call her for a while, and is shocked to find Lucy rushing around trying to look after the children and revealing that she doesn't listen to bells. Rosemary enlists the help of her husband Terry to discover what is wrong with Lucy. Terry is a chauvinist with no respect for Rosemary, and this attitude is clear in the way he speaks to both Lucy and Rosemary. However Lucy, in her permanent state of the "mother", treats the pair in the only way she knows how, as children. This approach quickly puts Terry in his place and puts an end to the petty squabbles between Rosemary and Terry, and the end result is the pair leaving hand in hand (if rather reluctantly).
2. "Drinking Companion": Harry, husband of Lucy, tries to flirt with perfume saleswoman Paula. Harry's obvious and strong advances scare Paula somewhat, however Paula makes the most of the free drinks Harry is providing until friend Bernice approaches and tries to get her to leave. Harry gives Paula his room key in obvious hope and persists to flirt and also trying his luck with Bernice. Eventually the women become quite adamant that they must leave so Harry goes to get them a taxi, whilst he is gone the two women escape leaving the key with a waiter.
3. "Between Mouthfuls": In the same hotel as the people in Drinking Companions two couples at adjoining restaurant tables realise an unwelcome common bond, assisted by an interactive waiter. Mrs Pearce wonders who Mr Pearce is sleeping with. Polly's not been frank to Martin (who really doesn't care at all about Polly's affair). The waiter is extremely well spoken. There's clever direction of the alternation between the two sets of conversations. A twist to the plot-line spices the ending.
4. "Gosforth's Fete": Publican Gosforth is running the village gala. Due to a big mistake bad personal news from Milly Carter is publicised over the public-address system. Milly's fiancé Stewart Stokes becomes extremely aggravated and drowns his sorrows with alcohol. Councillor Mrs Pearce, after the most disorganised greeting is electrocuted by the PA system. Gosforth's Fete starts like all village fetes do. However it develops into chaos and as things continue to go wrong the play climaxes to a complete disaster
5. "A Talk in the Park": In a park, the same in which Gosforth's Fete took place, sit five strangers on separate park benches, each with their own troubles. Arthur, a rather suspect fellow with an interest in cigarette card collecting and women-watching, sits next to Beryl and starts to relate his story of his likes and dislikes. Beryl is understandably quite disturbed by this, and proceeds in leaving her current bench and going to sit with Charles. Beryl is a young woman with a husband who beats her, and so she tells Charles this story and reads out a letter from the "bastard". Charles becomes quite sick of hearing this, so excuses himself and goes to sit next to man-hating dog-loving Doreen. Charles is an old business man on the verge of bankruptcy and so has no time for the youth of today. He reminisces on a happier time with his wife and children and asks Doreen to help him decipher his business report. Doreen is at this point very scared of the man who she thinks is perving on her, and so she sits next to Ernest. Ernest at this point is happily relaxing on his bench and so is very annoyed with being disturbed by a paranoid woman who starts to harp on about her dog. Doreen relates the story of taking her dog to the vets to get the snip, which is not a topic Ernest is interested in so he sneaks off leaving Doreen talking to herself. Ernest then collapses on the bench where Arthur is and proceeds in taking it over whilst moaning about his wife. The scene ends with each character trying to get the attention of the person they were trying to talk to, but failing. The end result is five miserable people who are all feeling ignored, despite the fact that it is their own fault for ignoring everyone else.
