= Clive Donner =

British film director (1926–2010)

- Born: Clive Stanley Donner; 21 January 1926; London, England
- Died: 6 September 2010 (aged 84); Virginia Water, England
- Occupations: Director; film editor
- Years active: 1943–1993
- Spouse: Jocelyn Rickards (m. 1971; died 2005)

Clive Stanley Donner (21 January 1926 – 6 September 2010) was a British film director who was part of the British New Wave, directing films such as The Caretaker, Nothing but the Best, What's New Pussycat?, and Here We Go Round the Mulberry Bush. He also directed television movies and commercials through the mid-1990s.

== Early career ==
Donner was born in West Hampstead, London. His father was a concert violinist and his mother ran a dress shop; his grandparents were Polish-Jewish immigrants. Donner began his filmmaking career while attending Kilburn Polytechnic. He began working in the film industry as a cutting-room assistant at Denham Studios, having gained the job after joining his father, who was at the studio to record the soundtrack for the film The Life and Death of Colonel Blimp (1943). Donner did his eighteen months of National Service with the Royal Army Educational Corps, and afterwards was hired by Pinewood Studios as a film editor, where the movies he worked on included Scrooge (1951), with Alastair Sim; The Card (1952), with Alec Guinness; Genevieve (1953), a comedy about a vintage car rally; The Million Pound Note (1954), with Gregory Peck; and I Am a Camera (1955), with Laurence Harvey.

== Career as director ==
=== Early works ===
Donner began his professional directing career on a number of low-budget films, starting with The Secret Place (1957), a crime drama about a troubled youth, starring Belinda Lee, Ronald Lewis, and David McCallum. After this Donner says he turned down Rooney and a film which he said was a copy of Genevieve with gliders. Then he agreed to make Heart of a Child (1958) a melodrama starring Jean Anderson and Donald Pleasence. Donner says then a new manager came in, Connery, and Rank released him from his contract.

Donner directed some commercials and some short features based on Edgar Wallace novels. He did Some People (1962), a film about a group of alienated youths who form a rock band, starring Kenneth More and Ray Brooks. His television work during that time included episodes of Danger Man (1960) and Sir Francis Drake (1961–62), as well as Mighty and Mystical, a documentary series about India.

=== 1960s ===
Donner's breakthrough directing role came with The Caretaker (1963), a film made with a low-budget funded almost entirely by financial contributions starting at £1,000 each from such individuals as Richard Burton, Noël Coward, Peter Sellers and Elizabeth Taylor, with the stars bypassing their standard fees and taking shares of the film's revenue. The movie, based on the play of the same name by Harold Pinter, was filmed in black-and-white with cinematography by Nicolas Roeg.

Donner's next film, Nothing but the Best (1964), was a satire on the British class system starring Alan Bates and Denholm Elliott, based on a screenplay by Frederic Raphael. The film tells the story of Jimmy Brewster (played by Bates) as a lower-class striver who seeks to move up in the system under the tutelage of his upper crust instructor Charlie Prince (Elliott). The reviews "briefly turned Clive Donner into one of the hottest directors in the world."

Donner's first large-budget film was What's New Pussycat? (1965), an American-financed comedy shot in France, starring Peter O'Toole and Peter Sellers. O'Toole played the womanizer Michael James, who does his best to remain faithful to his fiancée Carole Werner (Romy Schneider), while numerous women – Ursula Andress, Capucine, Paula Prentiss – fall in love with him, with Sellers playing the role of his psychoanalyst, Dr. Fassbender. The success of the title song, performed by Tom Jones, added to the motion picture's success with audiences. Woody Allen, who wrote the screenplay and made his first screen appearance in the movie, hated the result, commenting that the vision he had for the movie in his original script had been distorted.

Donner's film Luv (1967), an adaptation of the play by Murray Schisgal, starred Peter Falk, Jack Lemmon and Elaine May, but the addition of locations and characters to the original work led to criticism of the casting and direction, and the film was a commercial failure. Donner rounded out the 1960s with the 9th-century period piece Alfred the Great (1969), starring David Hemmings.

=== 1970s ===
In 1973, Donner's essay into theatre, directing Robert Patrick's play Kennedy's Children at the King's Head Theatre, Islington was ultimately produced internationally.

Donner directed the film Vampira (US: Old Dracula, 1974), a comedy horror film of the vampire genre that sought to piggyback on the commercial success of Young Frankenstein for its US release. He directed the made-for-television movie Spectre (1977), produced by Gene Roddenberry.

In 1978 Donner cast David Bowie and Charlotte Rampling in a film to be called Wally, centered around Egon Schiele and his relationship with his lover Wally Neuzil, however due to absence of funding the project never materialized.

=== 1980s ===
The Nude Bomb (1980) is a comedy based on the television series Get Smart, which featured Don Adams reprising his role as secret agent Maxwell Smart. This was followed by the parody Charlie Chan and the Curse of the Dragon Queen (1981) featuring Angie Dickinson, Michelle Pfeiffer, and Peter Ustinov. Stealing Heaven (1988) is a costume drama based on the 12th-century romance of Peter Abelard and Héloïse and was Donner's last theatrical film.

For television, Donner directed a film version of The Scarlet Pimpernel (1982) with Ian McKellen and Jane Seymour and productions based on two Charles Dickens novels, Oliver Twist (1982) and A Christmas Carol (1984), both starring George C. Scott.

== Death ==
Donner died at age 84 on 7 September 2010 at a care home in Virginia Water, Surrey, due to complications of Alzheimer's disease. His Australian wife, Jocelyn Rickards, a costume designer whom he met while working on Alfred the Great and married in 1971, had died in 2005.

== Bibliography ==
- Donner discusses the making of all his films in the book Six English Filmmakers (2014, Paul Sutton) ISBN 978-0957246256

== Selected filmography ==
=== As editor ===
- The Life and Death of Colonel Blimp (1943) (uncredited)
- On Approval (1944) (uncredited)
- The Way Ahead (1944) (uncredited)
- Oliver Twist (1948) (uncredited
- The Passionate Films (1949) (uncredited)
- Madeleine (1950) (uncredited)
- Pandora and the Flying Dutchman (1951) (uncredited)
- Scrooge (1951)
- The Card (1952)
- Meet Me Tonight (1952)
- Genevieve (1953)
- The Million Pound Note (1954)
- The Purple Plain (1954)
- I Am a Camera (1955)

=== As director ===
- The Secret Place (1957)
- Heart of a Child (1958)
- Marriage of Convenience (1960)
- Sir Francis Drake (1961) (TV series)
- Danger Man (1961) (TV series)
- The Sinister Man (1961)
- Some People (1962)
- Walter and Connie (1963) (TV series)
- The Caretaker (1963)
- Nothing but the Best (1964)
- What's New Pussycat? (1965)
- Here We Go Round the Mulberry Bush (1967)
- Luv (1967)
- Alfred the Great (1969)
- Vampira (1974)
- Rogue Male (1976)
- Spectre (1977)
- The Three Hostages (1977)
- She Fell Among Thieves (1978)
- The Thief of Baghdad (1978)
- The Nude Bomb (1980)
- Charlie Chan and the Curse of the Dragon Queen (1981)
- Oliver Twist (1982)
- The Scarlet Pimpernel (1982)
- To Catch a King (1984)
- A Christmas Carol (1984)
- Arthur the King (1985)
- Dead Man's Folly (1986)
- Babes in Toyland (1986)
- Stealing Heaven (1988)
- Not a Penny More, Not a Penny Less (1990)
- Terror Stalks the Class Reunion (1992)
- Charlemagne, le prince à cheval (1993)
