= That Uncertain Feeling (novel) =

1955 novel by Kingsley Amis

First US edition (publ. Harcourt Brace, 1956)

That Uncertain Feeling is a comic novel by Kingsley Amis, first published in 1955.

In 1961, the book was made into a film starring Peter Sellers, with the title changed to Only Two Can Play, to avoid confusion with similar contemporary titles. It was also adapted by the BBC in 1986 as a television series, starring Denis Lawson and Sheila Gish, this time with the original title.

== Plot ==
A satire on life and culture in a Welsh seaside town, the story concerns a married librarian who begins an affair with the bored wife of a local bigwig. Amis, an English incomer to Swansea in real life, mocks Wales's devotion to culture and learning as false and pretentious.
