= Benedick Bates =

British actor (born 1970)

- Born: November 1970 (age 55–56); United Kingdom
- Occupation: Actor
- Children: Sofia Bates, Ava Bates, Sienna Bates
- Parent(s): Sir Alan Bates; Victoria Ward

Benedick Bates (born November 1970) is a British actor.

He is the son of actor Sir Alan Bates and actress Victoria Ward and trained at the London Academy of Music and Dramatic Art.

He has performed numerous times with the Glasgow Citizens Company, at the Chichester Festival Theatre and Edinburgh Festival, and in London's West End, in stage productions which include Don Carlos, Romeo and Juliet, The Return of A. J. Raffles, The Rose Tattoo, The Picture of Dorian Gray, and Semi-Monde.

In 2002, Bates made his Broadway debut opposite his father in Ivan Turgenev's Fortune's Fool.

Bates's twin brother Tristan was also an actor. Tristan died following an ingestion of alcohol and either opium or heroin in Tokyo in 1990. Benedick Bates is a vice-president of the Tristan Bates Theatre, established at the Actors Centre in his memory.
