= The Dog It Was That Died =

Play by Tom Stoppard

The Dog It Was That Died is a play by the British playwright Tom Stoppard.

Written for BBC Radio in 1982, it concerns the dilemma faced by a spy over who he actually works for. The play was also adapted for television by Stoppard, and broadcast in 1988. The title is taken from Oliver Goldsmith's poem "An Elegy on the Death of a Mad Dog".

== Story ==
Rupert Purvis works for "Q6", a department of an unnamed espionage agency of the British Government. As the play begins, he is in the process of ending his life by jumping off Waterloo Bridge into the Thames. However, the attempt goes wrong when he falls not into the water but onto a passing barge, breaking his legs and killing a dog which was on the deck.

Over the course of the play, the reasons for his suicide attempt emerge. Some years ago, Purvis was approached by a Soviet spy named Rashnikov, who asked him to work as a double agent. Purvis reported this to his British superiors, who told him to pretend to work as a Soviet double agent whilst really working for them. However, Purvis also recalls that Rashnikov had told him to tell his British masters that he was being recruited, effectively setting up a double bluff ahead of time. Purvis also told this to the British – but is worried that when he did so, it was again because Rashnikov told him to do so. The upshot is that the British and the Russians have been using Purvis to shuttle false information between each other; but to allay the other side's suspicions, each has been giving real information to the other as well.

The result of this is that Purvis is no longer sure who his employer is – is he really working for the Russians or the British? Purvis's manager Giles Blair visits Purvis at Clifftops, a rest home on the Norfolk coast which is maintained by the agency for former spies who have suffered breakdowns. In the process of finding Purvis, Blair encounters not one but two inmates, both of whom pose as medical staff. The result is that when he finally meets the real administrator, Doctor Seddon, he is highly suspicious, and when Seddon tries to interest him in the guano he has found from a colony of bats in the bell tower (Blair: "Bats? In the belfry?!" Seddon: "Mmm. Had 'em for years and never realised."), he makes hasty excuses and runs away, bumping into Purvis as he does so.

They discuss Purvis's problem, and Blair, in the course of attempting to make Purvis feel better, inadvertently shows him that his entire life has been pointless. Purvis is actually greatly calmed by this, and he and Blair part on good terms. The next scene opens at Purvis's memorial service – he has succeeded in committing suicide by rolling his wheelchair off a cliff at the rest home. Blair ponders: "One asks oneself, with the benefit of hindsight, was Clifftops the ideal place to send someone with a tendency to fling themselves from a great height to a watery grave? Of course at the time one didn't realise it was a tendency..."

In the closing scene, the whole structure is explained by the agency's unnamed chief, although even this explanation remains dizzyingly complex. The chief sums up by saying, "Purvis was acting as a genuine Russian spy to preserve his cover as a bogus Russian spy. In other words, if Purvis's mother had been kicked by a donkey, things would be very much as they are. If I were Purvis I'd drown myself."

In a second suicide note delivered to Blair after his memorial service, Purvis explains that whatever side he was really on, at the end he decided he felt more sympathy for the British side and is almost convinced that they were in fact his employers. He concludes: "I hope I'm right. Although I would settle for knowing that I'm wrong." He also adds that he has learned that Rashnikov was recalled to the Soviet Union on suspicion of having been duped by the British. "Rashnikov said there was a perfectly good reason why this should have been the impression given; but unfortunately he died of a brainstorm while trying to work it out. You could say that the same thing happened to me."

== Characters ==
Giles Blair, Purvis's boss at Q6; sophisticated and worldly, he has none of Purvis's internal doubts and so has great difficulty grasping the crux of Purvis's dilemma. 'I never really got beyond us being British and them being atheists and communists. You can't argue with that so I think I rather switched off after that point... ...All you've got to do is remember what you believe.'

Blair represents the quintessential upper-class English bureaucrat; there is nothing of the glamour of James Bond about him. Despite being perhaps the central character of the play – certainly he has the most lines – he remains a somewhat ineffectual figure, happy to allow events to follow their course. Blair collects clocks – his house is full of them – and is also constructing a folly in the grounds of his house.

Rupert Purvis, a tortured soul. Purvis is highly principled, which makes it all the more upsetting for him when he can't recall exactly what those principles are.

Hogbin, described by Blair as a 'policeman' but actually another spy, Hogbin is assigned to investigate the circumstances of Purvis's suicide attempt, and in particular a letter he posted to Blair before his first attempt. Hogbin is the polar opposite of Blair – doggedly determined, prone to panic and seeing conspiracies at every turn.

Pamela Blair, wife of Giles. She runs a donkey sanctuary, occasionally appropriating her husband's study as an operating theatre for her injured charges. She is having an affair with Blair's boss; a fact about which both she and Blair are entirely open and unconcerned.

== Themes ==
The Dog It Was That Died has been described as Stoppard's 'le Carrécture', and it takes much of its mannered approach from John le Carré's work. The play takes place against a background of Cold War paranoia, and at the time of its first production it was quite believable that such complex shenanigans could take place. It is full of Stoppard's usual verbal pyrotechnics, particularly in those scenes where the full details of Purvis's career are being explored.

The characters of Blair and Purvis are contrasted skilfully – one the benignly complacent bureaucrat, the other a deeply principled fighter for his beliefs. There is also a class contrast between Blair and Hogbin; whilst the agencies involved are never specifically stated, their respective characters conform exactly to the period's stereotypes of MI6 and MI5 officers, as Blair is very much the upper-class and somewhat louche eccentric and Hogbin the conscientious if unimaginative middle-class moralist. However, in the end Blair proves to be more in control of the situation than Hogbin.

The play also explores eccentricity in general in a fond way. Virtually all the characters in it have a pronounced eccentricity of some kind: Blair's clocks and his folly; his wife's donkey sanctuary and casual affair with her husband's superior; the chief's regular smoking of opium; the obsession with rare cheese of the vicar who carries out Purvis's memorial; and Seddon's fascination with guano. Additionally, Blair and Purvis's former boss, "Jell", apparently used to wear hunting pink to the office. Purvis's second suicide note makes this delight in the gentle eccentricities of his countrymen explicit, describing English eccentricity as "a curious bloom, which here at Clifftops only appears in its overblown variety".

The title of the play comes from Oliver Goldsmith's poem "An Elegy on the Death of a Mad Dog" which ends:

But soon a wonder came to light,
That showed the rogues they lied:
The man recovered of the bite,
The dog it was that died.

In some ways Purvis may be seen as the mad dog of the poem.

Stoppard may have borrowed the idea to use this quotation from British novelist W. Somerset Maugham's 1925 novel The Painted Veil, in which the protagonist's husband, bitter at her infidelity, takes her to cholera-stricken China in hopes that she will take ill and die. When he catches cholera instead, he dies with the quotation "The dog it was that died" on his lips.

The words also occur in a speech by Wormold, the lead character in Graham Greene's 1958 novel Our Man in Havana – also an entertaining tale of Cold War espionage. ("I have come back", he said to Beatrice, "I am not under the table. I have come back victorious. The dog it was that died.")

== Productions ==
First produced 1982 on BBC Radio 3. The cast was:

Giles Blair: Charles Gray
Rupert Purvis: Dinsdale Landen
Hogbin: Kenneth Cranham
Pamela Blair: Penelope Keith
Chief: Maurice Denham
Doctor Seddon: John Le Mesurier

The play was transferred to television in 1989 by Channel 4. The director was Peter Wood. The cast was:

Giles Blair: Alan Bates
Rupert Purvis: Alan Howard
Hogbin: Simon Cadell
Pamela Blair: Ciaran Madden
Doctor Seddon: John Woodvine
