= Sheila Gish =

English actress (1942–2005)

- Gish in New Scotland Yard 1972
- Born: Sheila Anne Syme Gash; 23 April 1942; Lincoln, Lincolnshire, England
- Died: 9 March 2005 (aged 62); Camden, London, England
- Resting place: Highgate Cemetery, London, England
- Occupation: Actress
- Years active: 1968–2005
- Spouses: Roland Curram (m. 1964; div. 1985) Denis Lawson (m. 2004)
- Children: 2, including Lou Gish

Sheila Gish (born Sheila Anne Syme Gash; 23 April 1942 – 9 March 2005) was an English actress. For her role in the 1995 London revival of the Stephen Sondheim musical Company, she won the Olivier Award for Best Supporting Performance in a Musical.

Her film appearances included an A Day in the Death of Joe Egg (1972), Quartet (1981), Highlander (1986) and Mansfield Park (1999) On television, she starred in the 1969 BBC series The First Churchills, the 1992 TV miniseries of Danielle Steel's Jewels and the short-lived ITV sitcom Brighton Belles (1993–94).

== Early life and education ==
Gish was born in Lincoln, Lincolnshire, studied at the Royal Academy of Dramatic Art, graduating with an Acting (RADA Diploma) in 1962.

== Career ==
Her first starring role in the West End was as Bella in Robert and Elizabeth. She continued to be best known for her stage work. In 1976 she appeared in Alan Aykbourn's Confusions in London's West End, playing the roles of Rosemary, Bernice, Councillor Mrs Pearce and Doreen, for which she won the Clarence Derwent Award for Best Supporting Actress. In 1996, Gish played the role of Joanne in Stephen Sondheim's Company at the Donmar Warehouse directed by Sam Mendes, for which, she won the Laurence Olivier Award for Best Performance in a Supporting Role in a Musical. In 1999 she played Mrs Venable in Tennessee Williams's Suddenly Last Summer, directed by Sean Mathias with Rachel Weisz at the Comedy Theatre, London. One of her last stage roles was as Arkadina in the Chichester Festival Theatre's production of The Seagull in 2003.

Gish also appeared in many television dramas, she played Mary of Modena in The First Churchills (1969). She played the eccentric and outrageous Lady Montdore in the successful adaptation of Love in a Cold Climate (2001). She also appeared as June Boyse, a villain's wife, in the episode "A Harmless Vanity" of The Sweeney (1975), and played a suspicious housewife in an episode of Tales of the Unexpected (1982).

Gish occasionally appeared in films, her most notable performances being in A Day in the Death of Joe Egg (1972), Hitler: The Last Ten Days (1973), the Merchant Ivory film Quartet (1981), Merisairas (1996), and as Mrs Norris in Jane Austen's Mansfield Park (1999). She is also known for her appearance as Rachel Ellenstein in the film Highlander (1986), and its 2000 sequel Highlander: Endgame.

== Personal life ==
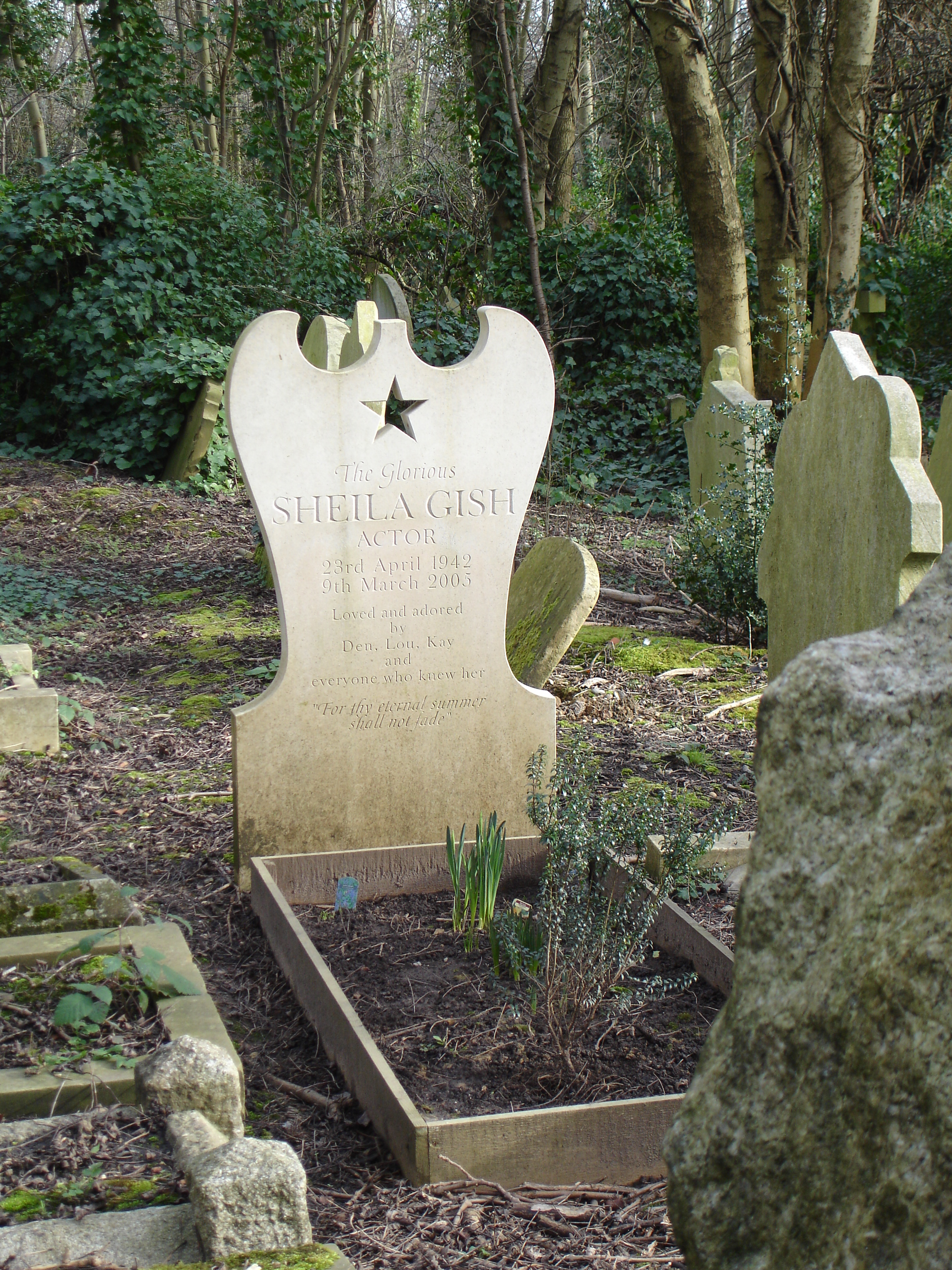
Gish's gravestone, Highgate Cemetery, London

Gish had two daughters: the actresses Lou Gish and Kay (Katharine Ghislaine S. A.) Curram (born 1974) by her first husband, the actor Roland Curram. While filming That Uncertain Feeling for BBC2 at BBC Cymru/Wales’ studios in Llandaf, Cardiff in 1985, she met actor Denis Lawson, who was to become her second husband.

In 2003, Gish lost her right eye during an oncological surgery to remove a tumor.

In March 2004, Gish married her partner Denis Lawson in Antigua.

Gish died of cancer in 2005 in Camden, London, aged 62.

== Selected filmography ==
Year	Title	Role	Notes
1965	Darling		Cameo (uncredited)
1968	Z-Cars	Jane	Episode: "Dead End – Part 1"
1969	The First Churchills	Queen Mary	5 episodes
1969	Fraud Squad	Leonie	Episode: "Last Exit to Liechenstein"
1969	The Troubleshooters	Sue Kihl	Episode: "How Much is One Man's Worth?"
1970	The Reckoning	Mrs. Garner	
1970	Every Home Should Have One	Mother in TV Commercial (uncredited)	
1971	The Rivals of Sherlock Holmes	Mrs. Chalmers	Episode: "The Affair of the Avalanche Bicycle & Tyre Co. Ltd.
1972	A Day in the Death of Joe Egg	Pam	
1972	New Scotland Yard	Kay Stevens	Episode: "Shock Tactics"
1973	The Adventurer	Laura	Episode: "To the Lowest Bidder"
1973	Hitler: The Last Ten Days	Gerda Christian	
1975	The Sweeney	June	Episode: "Jigsaw"
1976	Yes, Honestly	Antonia Lavenham	Episode: "Black and White and Red All Over"
1977	Anna Karenina	Princess Betsy	7 episodes
1979	Thomas and Sarah	Polly	Episode: "Putting on the Ritz"
1981	Goodbye Darling	Janet Lyall	4 episodes
1981	Quartet	Anna	
1982	The Gentle Touch	Adela Baker	Episode: "Victims"
1986	Highlander	Rachel Ellenstein	
1986	That Uncertain Feeling	Elizabeth Gruffydd-Williams	4 episodes
1988	Worlds Beyond	Mrs. Hitchcock	Reflections of Evil
1989	Boon	Barbara Lake	Episode: "Love Letters From a Dead Man"
1989	Chambre à part	Mme. Kirby	
1991	The House of Elliot	Yolande Hermane	1 episode
1991	Stanley and the Women	Nowell Hutchinson	4 episodes (mini-series)
1992	Jewels	Victoria Thomspon	2 episodes (mini-series)
1993	The Brighton Belles	Bridget	10 episodes
1993	Inspector Morse	Gwladys Probert	Episode: "Twilight of the Gods"
1995	The Ghosbusters of East Finchley	Mrs. Paget	1 episode
1995	The Thin Blue Line	Maeve – The Sex Therapist	Episode: "Night Shift"
1996	Merisairas	Martina Schaffer	
1997	Jonathan Creek	Serena Shale	Episode: "The Wrestler's Tomb"
1997	Pie in the Sky	Julia Sutton	Episode: "Pork Pies"
1998	Supply & Demand	Pauline Monroe	Episodes: "Golden Goose (Parts 1 and 2)"
1999	Mansfield Park	Mrs. Norris	
2000	Highlander: Endgame	Rachel Ellenstein	
2001	Love in a Cold Climate	Lady Montdore	3 episodes (mini-series)

== See also ==
- List of British actors
