= Only Two Can Play =

1962 British film by Sidney Gilliat

- US cinema poster
- Directed by: Sidney Gilliat
- Screenplay by: Bryan Forbes
- Based on: That Uncertain Feeling by Kingsley Amis
- Produced by: Leslie Gilliat
- Starring: Peter Sellers; Mai Zetterling; Virginia Maskell; Richard Attenborough
- Cinematography: John Wilcox
- Edited by: Thelma Connell
- Music by: Richard Rodney Bennett
- Color process: Black and white
- Production company: Vale Film Productions
- Distributed by: British Lion Films
- Release date: 1962
- Running time: 106 minutes
- Country: United Kingdom
- Language: English

Only Two Can Play is a 1962 British comedy film directed by Sidney Gilliat starring Peter Sellers, Mai Zetterling and Virginia Maskell. The screenplay was by Bryan Forbes, based on the 1955 novel That Uncertain Feeling by Kingsley Amis.

== Plot ==
John Lewis is a poorly paid and professionally frustrated librarian and occasional drama critic, whose affections fluctuate between glamorous Liz and his long-suffering wife Jean.

When a better paid job becomes vacant, Lewis is reluctant to apply, but is persuaded to do so by Jean. Then, he meets the obviously attractive Elizabeth Gruffydd-Williams (Liz), a designer with the local amdram company and wife of a local councillor.

Liz offers to intercede with her husband to help in getting Lewis the job, and makes it clear that she is attracted to him. Lewis is easily seduced into an affair, although it remains unconsummated.

Having been persuaded by Liz to leave the theatre's new production early one evening for an assignation, Lewis submits a bogus review to the local newspaper, but learns the next morning that the theatre burned down shortly after the play commenced. Jean thus learns of the affair and retaliates by encouraging her old flame Gareth Probert, a self-important literary character and dramatist (who wrote the ill-fated play). Lewis also loses the friendship of his colleague and best friend, Ieuan Jenkins, who had a role in the play.

When Lewis is offered the better paid job, he realises that Liz will now use and control him if he lets her. Finally realising the price he has paid, he breaks off the affair and takes a job as a mobile librarian, in the hope that this will keep him away from predatory women. Jean is not so sure that he can resist them, and tags along to keep an eye on him.

== Cast ==
- Peter Sellers as John Lewis
- Mai Zetterling as Liz
- Virginia Maskell as Jean
- Kenneth Griffith as Jenkins
- Raymond Huntley as Vernon
- David Davies as Benyon
- Maudie Edwards as Mrs. Davies
- Meredith Edwards as clergyman
- John Le Mesurier as Salter
- Frederick Piper as Mr. Davies
- Graham Stark as Mr. Hyman
- Eynon Evans as Town Hall Clerk
- John Arnatt as Bill
- Sheila Manahan as Mrs. Jenkins
- Richard Attenborough as Probert
- Desmond Llewelyn as vicar
- George Woodbridge as farmer

== Production ==
John Boulting had made a film from Lucky Jim by Kingsley Amis and Gilliat thought Amis' That Uncertain Feeling might also make a film. He had his reservations but was persuaded by the enthusiasm of Bryan Forbes, who wrote the script, and they persuaded Peter Sellers to star.

Only Two Can Play was filmed largely in and around Swansea, Amis's model for its setting, Aberdarcy; crowds of both supporters and demonstrators watched filming, and MI5 agents shadowed Zetterling, who was suspected of Communist sympathies. It was released with an X certificate, the first given to a comedy by the British Board of Film Censors, although it includes only a brief glimpse of nudity.

Gilliat says Peter Sellers was difficult during filming. The star disliked Maskell's performance and wanted her replaced by a genuine Welsh actor. Gilliat had to involve John Boulting to get the situation to quieten down.

== Reception ==
=== Box office ===
The Times reported the film was the third most successful film at the British box office in 1962.

Films and Filming said it was the fourth most popular for Britain for the year ended 31 October 1962 after The Guns of Navarone (1961), Dr. No (1962) and The Young Ones (1961).

=== Critical reception ===
New York Times film critic Bosley Crowther wrote: "ANYBODY who could do to organized labor what Peter Sellers did with his thumping performance of a union leader in the British comedy, "I'm All Right, Jack [1959]," is clearly the fellow to do the same thing to sex. And we are pleased to be able to proclaim he does it in his latest side-splitter, Only Two Can Play. With a script by Bryan Forbes that pops perpetually with some of the brightest British quips of modern times, with Sidney Gilliat directing and with a spanking new Mai Zetterling deftly applying the itching-powders as a grandly seductive Eve, Mr. Sellers performs an old Adam that puts all recent seventh-year scratchers in the shade."

The Radio Times Guide to Films gave the film 4/5 stars, writing: "This small-town drama is played out as farce and makes its satirical points with comic deftness. The title is misleading because the players in this story of a would-be adulterous Welsh librarian (Peter Sellers) and his wannabe mistress (Mai Zetterling) also include Virginia Maskell as his dispirited wife and Richard Attenborough as the poet she flirts with. That the film succeeds is partly down to Sellers's unusually restrained performance, which makes his character more believable."

Leslie Halliwell said: "Well characterised and generally diverting 'realistic' comedy which slows up a bit towards the end but contains many memorable sequences and provides its star's last good character performance." On the review aggregator website Rotten Tomatoes, 83% of 6 critics' reviews are positive.

== Accolades ==
Only Two Can Play was nominated for Best Film, Best Screenplay, Best Actor for Peter Sellers and Best British Film at the 1963 BAFTA awards.
