= A Day in the Death of Joe Egg (film) =

1972 film by Peter Medak

- VHS cover
- Directed by: Peter Medak
- Written by: Peter Nichols (play/screenplay)
- Produced by: David Deutsch
- Starring: Alan Bates; Janet Suzman; Peter Bowles; Joan Hickson; Sheila Gish
- Cinematography: Ken Hodges
- Edited by: Ray Lovejoy
- Production company: Domino
- Distributed by: Columbia Pictures
- Release dates: May 1972 (London-Premiere); 4 June 1972 (NYC)
- Running time: 106 minutes
- Country: United Kingdom
- Language: English

A Day in the Death of Joe Egg is a 1972 British black comedy film directed by Peter Medak, and starring Alan Bates and Janet Suzman. It is based on the play of the same name by Peter Nichols.

== Plot ==
Christmas is fast approaching, and British schoolteacher Bri is bitter and vexed upon seeing his classroom of schoolboys loudly talking and interrupting him. He forces them to put their hands on their heads and sit there in silence well after the dismissal bell has sounded, whereupon he has a fantasy of a nude blonde woman, makes a Freudian slip comment about breasts, and mischievously flees the school in his ageing vehicle (while still leaving the schoolboys sitting there, never dismissing them), returning home to spend the holiday with his family.

He plays a playful prank on Sheila, his wife, taping a fake rubber spider to his face. Sheila is an eccentric, ditzy housewife who collects a wide assortment of domestic pets, including guinea pigs, a Siamese cat and two parakeets. The couple's quirky banter becomes increasingly frenzied and bizarre, and when they enter the back room of their home, it's revealed that they have an adolescent daughter, Josephine (affectionately called "Joe Egg" and "Jo"). Josephine had some unexplained form of severe intellectual disability, unable to walk, use the toilet or speak to anybody. A flashback to a trip at the beach reveals that Sheila had a narrow pelvic opening, resulting in a risky and troublesome birth.

Bri and Sheila pretend to be Josephine back and forth in order to fantasize a facsimile of a conversation with her. Josephine urinates, and as Bri has to change her, he begs her to say something to him, while Sheila talks to herself casually. The couple is increasingly distracted by their myriad sexual games at home, coupled with nosy neighbours and Josephine's doctors and nurses. Bri worries that Josephine is "fat" and "jaundiced", and wonders about the long-term state of her health. He and Sheila increasingly rely on dark humour to make their pain bearable.

As they consider Josephine's quality of life, at one point they even contemplate euthanasia, while neighbours and friends point out the potential merits of committing the girl to a nursing home. As Josephine becomes terminally ill and close to death, Sheila suspects that Bri may have something to do with it. They struggle to hold their family together, along with a close-knit group of wacky friends and relatives, while Josephine languishes at home. When Josephine eventually survives, Sheila finally realizes the mental toll the whole ordeal has had on Bri, and she admits quietly to him her plans to leave the girl in a residential hospital forever, hoping to have a second honeymoon with her husband. Bri flees the house with a suitcase that morning, boarding a train for London, which he falls asleep on. Sheila wanders their home talking to each of her pets, then kissing Josephine, before she strips naked and climbs back into bed alone.

== Cast ==
- Alan Bates as Bri
- Janet Suzman as Sheila
- Peter Bowles as Freddie
- Sheila Gish as Pam
- Joan Hickson as Grace
- Elizabeth Robillard as Jo
- Murray Melvin as the Doctor
- Fanny Carby as the Nun
- Constance Chapman as the Moonrocket Lady
- Elizabeth Tyrell as the Midwife
- Jean Marsh as Mother in Toy Store (Uncredited)

== Release ==
=== Home media ===
The film was released for the first time on DVD by SPHE on 4 March 2011.

== Reception ==
Variety called it "a superior black comedy-drama" and commended Medak's direction, Bates and Suzman's performances, and the pace. Vincent Canby of The New York Times commended the film's humor, script, and Bates' and Suzman's performances. Dennis Schwartz from Ozus' World Movie Reviews rated the film a grade B+, writing "an uncomfortable but provocative film about the fate of an unwanted helpless child. It's a glum film that's not for everyone. But it's easy to admire for its realism."

Stanley Kauffmann of The New Republic described A Day in the Death of Joe Egg as a 'faulty but intelligent and interesting picture'.
