= Nothing but the Best (film) =

1964 British film by Clive Donner

- Directed by: Clive Donner
- Written by: Frederic Raphael
- Based on: short story The Best of Everything by Stanley Ellin
- Produced by: David Deutsch
- Starring: Alan Bates; Denholm Elliott; Harry Andrews; Millicent Martin
- Cinematography: Nicolas Roeg
- Edited by: Fergus McDonell
- Music by: Ron Grainer
- Production company: Domino Productions
- Distributed by: Anglo-Amalgamated Film Distributors Ltd. (UK)
- Release dates: 10 March 1964 (London, England)
- Running time: 99 minutes
- Country: England
- Language: English
- Budget: £175,594

Nothing but the Best is a 1964 British black comedy film directed by Clive Donner and starring Alan Bates, Denholm Elliott, Harry Andrews and Millicent Martin. The screenplay by Frederic Raphael is based on the 1952 short story "The Best of Everything" by Stanley Ellin.

A young and ambitious businessman hires an unemployed upper-class man to tutor him in a number of life skills.

== Plot ==
James Brewster, a young man starting with a large London firm of estate agents and auctioneers, is ambitious to get to the top. In a cheap café, he meets Charles Prince, a drunken layabout who has everything James wants: effortless upper-class arrogance and impeccable tailoring. In return for a room to live in and loans for drink and betting, Charles agrees to tutor James in the life skills which he thinks are necessary to succeed. By bluff and sabotage, James rises in his firm, catching the eye of the owner and of his only daughter Ann.

Disaster threatens when Charles has a big win and wants to end the deal. James hastily strangles him, and while smuggling his body out in a steamer trunk, his landlady Mrs. Zena March catches him, suspicious about Charles's sudden disappearance. James is forced to comprise a cover story and move Charles's belongings (and body) to the basement.

After a long courtship, Ann agrees to marry James and her father makes him a partner in the business. Having conveniently sent his lower-middle-class parents to Australia, James anticipates his success being crowned by a grand society wedding. Ann's father confesses that he has a totally disreputable son who they never see called Charles. They sent for his things, including his trunk. Ann's two dogs smell the odour, possibly from the dead body, and race past James, up the staircase. They cause the movers to drop the trunk, which breaks the banisters, falling to the floor, and proving to be full of books, without the body. James is later blackmailed by Zena into continuing their sexual liaison in exchange for having previously hidden Charles's body in her cellar.

The wedding proceeds, and Ann and James go off on their honeymoon. Upon returning, James meets a client, Mr. Coates, at one of his new development sites— which happens to be his old lodgings. Zena sent a note forewarning him that she's fled to South Africa. James smiles as the developers bulldoze and discover the body, as he conveniently plots to pin the murder on the now absconded Zena.

== Cast ==
- Alan Bates as Jimmy Brewster
- Denholm Elliott as Charlie Prince
- Harry Andrews as Mr. Horton
- Millicent Martin as Ann Horton
- Pauline Delaney as Mrs. March
- Godfrey Quigley as Coates
- Alison Leggatt as Mrs. Brewster
- Lucinda Curtis as Nadine
- Nigel Stock as Ferris
- James Villiers as Hugh
- Drewe Henley as Denis
- Avice Landone as Mrs. Horton
- Ernest Clark as Roberts
- Willie Rushton as Gerry
- Peter Madden as ex-politician
- Donald Pickering as Adrian Slater
- Howard Lang as Jutson
- Julian Holloway as bank teller (uncredited)

== Production ==
Film rights to the short story The Best of Everything were bought by Anglo-Amalgamated, where David Deutsch was working. Deutsch hired Frederick Raphael to write the script. The author later recalled he turned the story into " somewhat larky version of Theodore Dreiser’s An American Tragedy, though with a happy ending." Raphael was inspired by his own history of being a young American who moved to England. He said, "I very quickly realized—because England was a very dominant and assertive culture, and an intimidating one—that you either learned how to be like the English, or you weren't going to get anywhere. And as most seven-year-olds can, and as Jews traditionally are supposedly able to do, I did manage to do it successfully, so successfully that I would find it hard today to detach the mask from the face. So the story of Jimmy Brewster was not as alien as one might imagine."

Raphael wrote in his memoirs another inspiration for the film was The Scoundrel (1935). Producer David Deutsch chose Clive Donner, who he had known for several years, to direct. According to Raphael "since Clive had gone into the movie business as an apprentice, his ascent had something in common with that of my script’s James Brewster, who... was bent on mounting the slippery pole of modern success."

Raphael claims Nat Cohen and Stuart Levy, who ran Anglo-Amalgamated, did not understand the film when they first saw it, so the writer added a narration.

== Critical reception ==
Variety praised the film's "impeccable acting, sharp exchanges and colorful London scene."

The Monthly Film Bulletin wrote: "The theme is Room at the Top reconstructed for laughs; the cast includes a leavening of people from TW3; and the attitudes are in general nicely ambiguous, so that the film (like TW3 itself) can put on quite a show of social ruthlessness and general audacity without committing itself very far in any particular direction. ... Denholm Elliott plays the 1960s remittance man in rich style, achieving precisely the right suggestion of a mannered insolence still intact, but beginning to fray badly at the edges. He also gets many of the best lines in a script which veers erratically between dialogue which is funny and accurate, and lines which dangerously undermine the film's pretensions to serious social satire. ... All the same, the script is often sharply funny, as well as being consistently inventive in the way it keeps things moving, allowing the director a range of settings and locations which are used up to the hilt. ...The director gets admirable performances from Alan Bates, as the blandly ruthless hero, Harry Andrews as his father-in-law and Pauline Delany as his cat-hugging landlady. Its main asset, however, is its sprucely cheerful good looks: for a supposedly black comedy, Nothing But the Best keeps its spirits up remarkably."

British film critic Leslie Halliwell said: "Hard, skilful, rather unattractive comedy with interesting social comments on its time."

The Radio Times Guide to Films gave the film 4/5 stars, writing: "Scripted by Frederic Raphael, photographed by Nicolas Roeg and directed by Clive Donner, this has all the credentials to be one of the best British big-screen satires. There's no denying it's a very funny film, a sort of School for Scoundrels in a Room at the Top, but the brushstrokes are so broad that there is no room for the finer detail that would have made it a classic. Alan Bates is splendid as a working-class wannabe, but Denholm Elliott steals every scene as an indolent aristocrat who tutors him in the delicate art of being a cad."

== Box office ==
The film was not a financial success. Film critic and historian Alexander Walker wrote "in spite of its air of smartness and knowingness, Nothing but the Best fell dismally flat. It almost seemed as if satire was of consuming interest everywhere except at the cinema box-office. Or perhaps it was simply that the cast had lacked a star whose very presence was a guaranteed draw." However Filmink pointed out the quality of the reviews helped launch the career of Clive Donner.

Anglo-Amalgamated announced Deutsch and Donner would make another comedy, Tall Dark and Handsome, from a script by Stephen Lewis but it was never made.

== Notes ==
- McGilligan, Patrick (2006). "Frederic Raphael". Backstory 4 : interviews with screenwriters of the 1970s and 1980s.
- Raphael, Frederic (2015). Going up : to Cambridge and beyond - a writer's memoir.
