= Alan Bates =

English actor (1934–2003)

Sir Alan Bates CBE
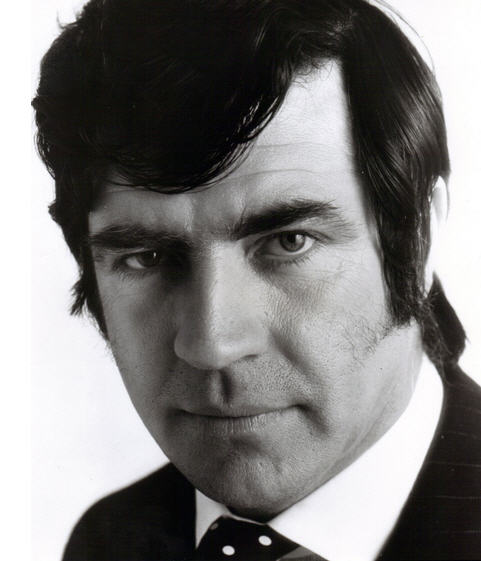
- Bates in 1975
- Born: Alan Arthur Bates; 17 February 1934; Allestree, Derby, England
- Died: 27 December 2003 (aged 69); London, England
- Education: Royal Academy of Dramatic Art
- Occupation: Actor
- Years active: 1956–2003
- Children: 2, including Benedick

Sir Alan Arthur Bates (17 February 1934 – 27 December 2003) was an English actor who came to prominence in the 1960s, when he appeared in films ranging from Whistle Down the Wind to the kitchen sink drama A Kind of Loving.

Bates is also known for his performance with Anthony Quinn in Zorba the Greek, as well as his roles in King of Hearts, Georgy Girl, Far From the Madding Crowd and The Fixer, for which he received an Academy Award nomination for Best Actor. In 1969, he starred in the Ken Russell film Women in Love with Oliver Reed and Glenda Jackson.

Bates went on to star in The Go-Between, An Unmarried Woman, Nijinsky and in The Rose with Bette Midler, as well as many television dramas, including The Mayor of Casterbridge, Harold Pinter's The Collection, A Voyage Round My Father, An Englishman Abroad (as Guy Burgess) and Pack of Lies. He also appeared on the stage, notably in the plays of Simon Gray, such as Butley and Otherwise Engaged.

== Early life and education ==
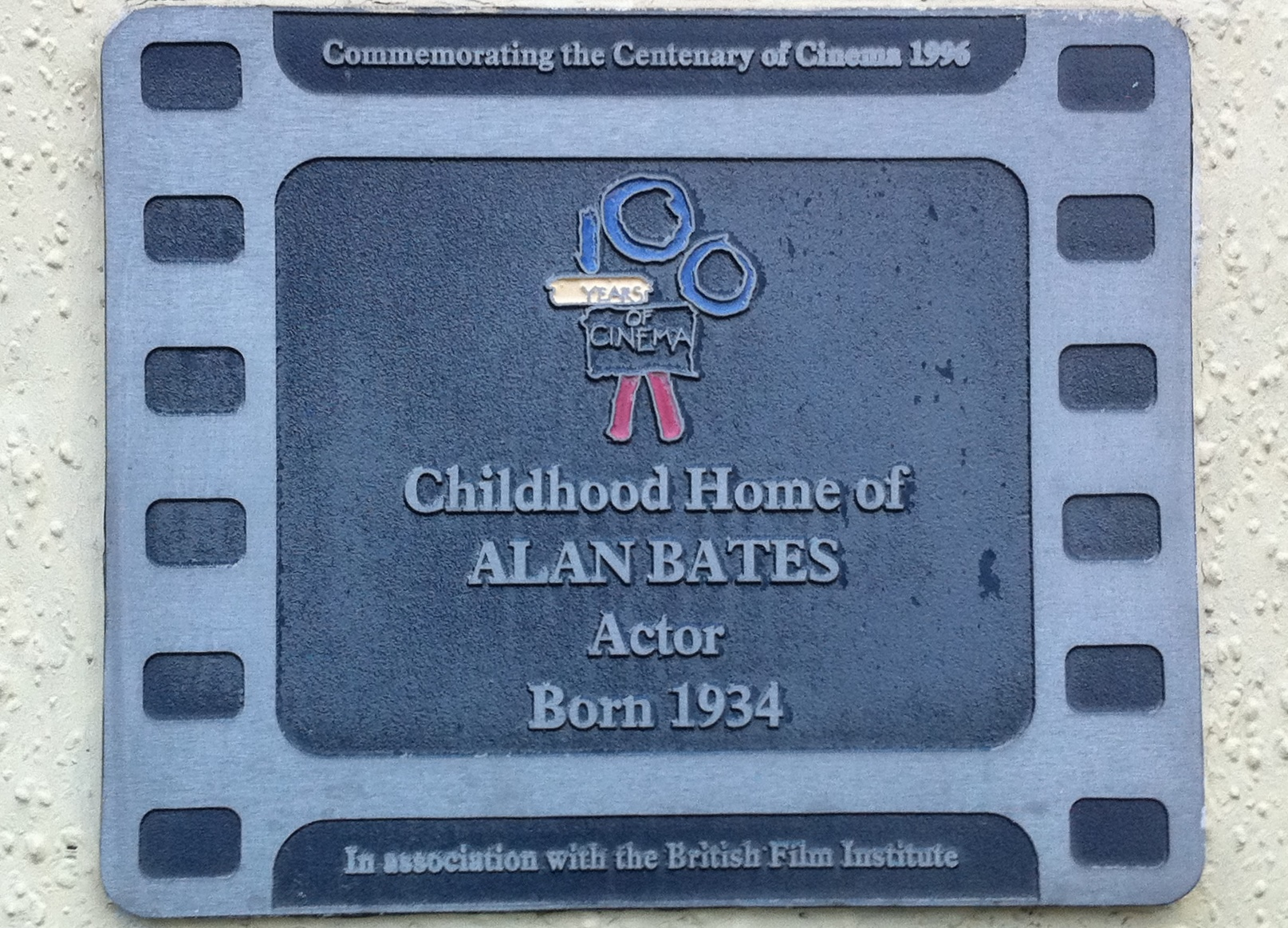
The blue plaque on Alan Bates's childhood home—in association with the British Film Institute.

Bates was born at the Queen Mary Nursing Home, Darley Abbey, Derby, England, on 17 February 1934, the eldest of three boys born to Florence Mary (née Wheatcroft), a housewife and a pianist, and Harold Arthur Bates, an insurance broker and a cellist. They lived in Allestree, Derby, at the time of Bates's birth, but briefly moved to Mickleover before returning to Allestree.

Both his parents were amateur musicians who encouraged Bates to pursue music. By the age of 11, having decided to become an actor, he studied drama instead. He further developed his vocation by attending productions at Derby's Little Theatre.

Bates was educated at the Herbert Strutt Grammar School, Derby Road, Belper, Derbyshire (now "Strutts", a volunteer led business and community centre) and later gained a scholarship to the Royal Academy of Dramatic Art in London, where he studied with Albert Finney and Peter O'Toole, before leaving to join the RAF for National Service at RAF Newton.

== Career ==
=== Early stage appearances ===
Bates's stage debut was in 1955, in You and Your Wife, in Coventry.

In 1956, Bates made his West End debut as Cliff in Look Back in Anger, a role he had originated at the Royal Court and which made him a star. He also played the role on television (for the ITV Play of the Week) and on Broadway. He also was a member of the 1967 acting company at the Stratford Festival in Canada, playing the title role in Richard III.

=== Television ===
In the late 1950s, Bates appeared in several plays for television in Britain in shows such as ITV Play of the Week, Armchair Theatre and ITV Television Playhouse.

In 1960, Bates appeared as Giorgio in the final episode of The Four Just Men (TV series) entitled Treviso Dam.

Bates worked for the Padded Wagon Moving Company in the early 1960s while acting at the Circle in the Square Theatre in New York City.

=== Film stardom (1960–1979) ===
Bates made his feature film debut in The Entertainer (1960) opposite Laurence Olivier, Joan Plowright, Albert Finney, and the rest of the ensemble cast. Bates played the lead in his second feature, Whistle Down the Wind (1961), opposite Hayley Mills and directed by Bryan Forbes. He followed it with the lead in A Kind of Loving (1962), directed by John Schlesinger in his film debut. Both films were very popular in the UK, with the latter earning him a BAFTA nomination for Best Actor and establishing Bates as a film star. Some film critics cited the 1963 crime drama The Running Man as being one of Bates's finest performances. The film starred Laurence Harvey as a man who fakes his death and Lee Remick as his increasingly conflicted wife, with Bates in the supporting role of Stephen Maddox, an insurance company investigator.

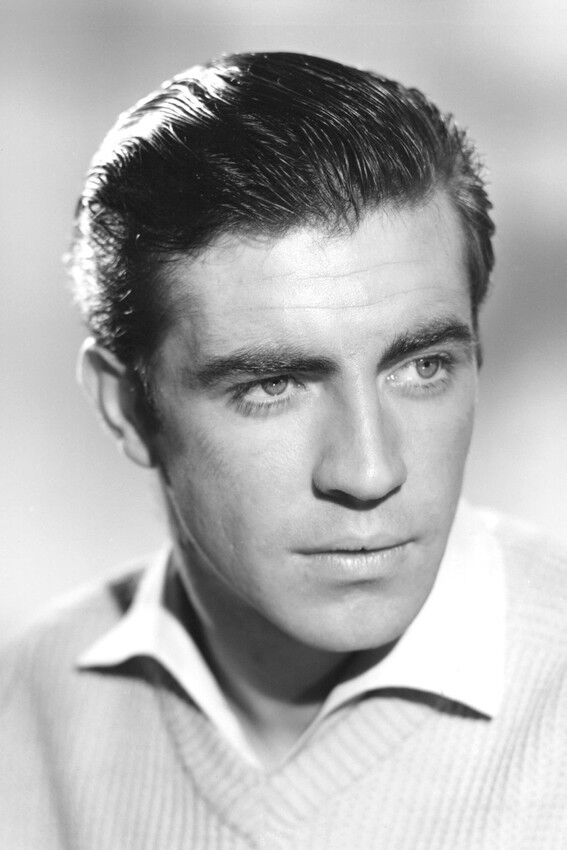
Bates head shot for his film debut, The Entertainer (1960).

Bates next co-starred in an adaptation of Harold Pinter's The Caretaker (1963) along with Donald Pleasence and Robert Shaw. It was directed by Clive Donner, who then made Nothing But the Best (1964) with Bates. He was the co-lead alongside Anthony Quinn in the Academy Award-winning hit Michael Cacoyannis film Zorba the Greek (1964); the lead in a short film, Once Upon a Tractor (1965); and starred in Philippe de Broca's King of Hearts (1966).

Bates also starred as the male lead opposite Lynn Redgrave as the titular Georgy Girl (1966), which also featured James Mason and Charlotte Rampling in supporting roles. He was reunited with Schlesinger in Far From the Madding Crowd (1967), starring Julie Christie, Terence Stamp, and Peter Finch. For these two films, Bates earned himself three Golden Globe nominations: Best Comedy/Musical Actor and Best Male Newcomer; and Best Drama Actor the following ceremony, respectively.

In 1968, Bates starred alongside Dirk Bogarde and Ian Holm in the John Frankenheimer film The Fixer (1968), adapted from the Bernard Malamud novel based on the true story of Menahem Mendel Beilis. It earned Bates an Academy Award nomination for Best Actor, as well as another Golden Globe nomination. He followed that up with Women in Love (1969), directed by Ken Russell and co-starring Oliver Reed and Glenda Jackson, in which Bates and Reed wrestled completely naked. The scene was groundbreaking for taboos of the time, as it was the first studio film to ever feature full frontal male nudity. Bates also earned another BAFTA nomination for Best Actor for his performance.

Following that success, he appeared as Col Vershinin in the National Theatre's film of Three Sisters, reuniting him with Olivier (who directed) and Plowright. He was handpicked by director Schlesinger to play the male lead in the film Sunday Bloody Sunday (1971). However, he was preoccupied filming The Go-Between (1971) for director Joseph Losey alongside Christie again, and had also become a father around that time, so refused the role (which ultimately went to Finch opposite co-lead Jackson).

Bates starred in the film adaptation of A Day in the Death of Joe Egg (1972) with Janet Suzman and produced and appeared in a short, Second Best (1972). He starred in Story of a Love Story (1973). He also starred in two adaptations of his successful theatrical roles: his Tony-winning role in Butley (1974), as well as In Celebration (1975). He was the villain in Royal Flash (1975). He appeared alongside Susannah York and John Hurt in The Shout (1978); and opposite Jill Clayburgh in An Unmarried Woman (1978). He also played Bette Midler's ruthless business manager in the film The Rose (1979).

=== Film and television (1980s) ===
Bates starred in the TV movie Piccadilly Circus (1977) and The Mayor of Casterbridge (1978). In the latter he played Michael Henchard, the ultimately-disgraced lead, which he described as his favourite role. Bates played two diametrically opposed roles in An Englishman Abroad (1983), as Guy Burgess, a gay member of the Cambridge spy ring exiled in Moscow, and in Pack of Lies (1987), as a British Secret Service agent tracking several Soviet spies.

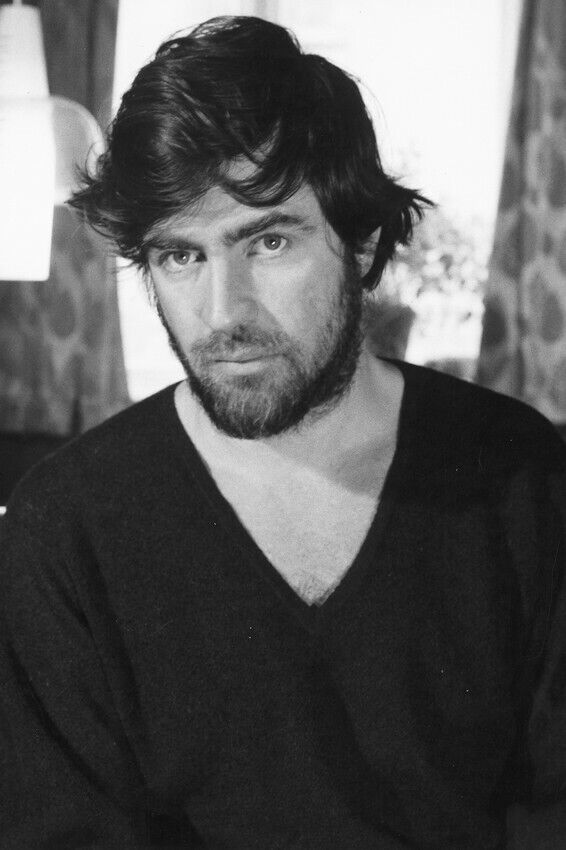
Publicity still of Bates, c.1970.

His film roles this decade were more sparse, but included Herbert Ross's Nijinsky (1980), in which he portrayed yet another role as both a closeted gay lover and a domineering mentor. The following year, he was part of James Ivory's Quartet (1981), also starring Maggie Smith, Isabelle Adjani, and Anthony Higgins. Bates succeeded that with The Return of the Soldier (1982), which reunited him with Julie Christie, Glenda Jackson, and Ian Holm. The Wicked Lady (1983) teamed him up with Faye Dunaway but received poor reviews.

Bates then starred alongside Julie Andrews as the husband of her violinist who is stricken with multiple sclerosis in Duet for One (1986). In the North Irish IRA thriller A Prayer for the Dying (1987) from director Mike Hodges, he plays the main antagonist opposite Mickey Rourke and Bob Hoskins. And in We Think the World of You (1988), he portrays the older lover of young convict Gary Oldman—the latter of whom gets sent to jail and entrusts his beloved, mischievous German Shepherd (a.k.a. Alsatian) to the former's care.

=== Later career ===
Bates continued working in film and television in the 1990s, including the role of Claudius in Franco Zeffirelli's version of Hamlet (1990). In 2001 he joined an all-star cast in Robert Altman's critically acclaimed period drama Gosford Park, in which he played the butler Jennings. He later played Antonius Agrippa in the 2004 TV film Spartacus, but died before it premiered. The film was dedicated to his memory and that of writer Howard Fast, who wrote the original novel that inspired the film Spartacus by Stanley Kubrick.

On stage, Bates had a particular association with the plays of Simon Gray, appearing in Butley, Otherwise Engaged, Stage Struck, Melon, Life Support, and Simply Disconnected, as well as the film of Butley and Gray's TV series Unnatural Pursuits. In Otherwise Engaged, his co-star was Ian Charleson, who became a friend, and Bates later contributed a chapter to a 1990 book on his colleague after Charleson's early death.

Bates was made a Commander of the Order of the British Empire (CBE) in the 1995 Birthday Honours, and was knighted in the 2003 New Year Honours, in both cases for services to drama. He was an Associate Member of RADA, and was a patron of The Actors Centre, Covent Garden, London, from 1994 until his death in 2003.

== Personal life ==
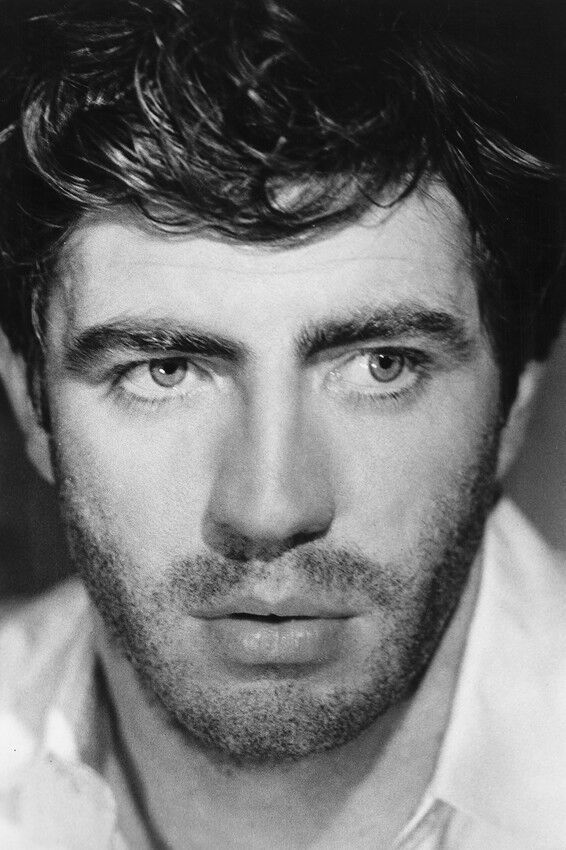
Bates in the mid-1960s.

Bates had numerous gay relationships, including long-term affairs with actor Nickolas Grace and Olympic skater John Curry, as detailed in Donald Spoto's authorised biography Otherwise Engaged: The Life of Alan Bates.

Bates privately admitted to being bisexual or homosexual at different points in his life; Spoto characterised Bates's sexuality as ambiguous, stating, "He liked to appear publicly with women and cuddle with them privately. However, his serious romances and most passionate sexual life occurred with men. [...] In his private life, he wanted most of all to have one true and enduring relationship, to love and be loved by one faithful man." Even after homosexuality was partially decriminalised in England in 1967, Bates rigorously avoided interviews and questions about his personal life, and even denied to his male lovers that there was a homosexual component in his nature.

Bates was married to actress Valerie 'Victoria' Ward from 1970 until her death from a heart attack associated with wasting disease in 1992, though the two had separated early in their marriage around 1973. They had twin sons, born in November 1970: the actors Benedick Bates and Tristan Bates. Tristan died following an ingestion of alcohol and either opium or heroin in Tokyo in 1990, devastating Bates. In the later years of his life, Bates had a brief relationship with the Welsh actress Angharad Rees, though this faced the complexities of Bates' need for independence and predilection for male companionship.

Throughout his life, Bates sought to be regarded as charming and charismatic, or at least as a man who, as an actor, could appear attractive to and attracted by women. He also chose some roles with an aspect of homosexuality or bisexuality, including the role of Rupert in the 1969 film Women in Love, the role of Diaghilev in the 1980 film Nijinsky and the role of Frank in the 1988 film We Think the World of You.

== Death ==
Following a battle with diabetes and a stroke, Bates died of pancreatic cancer on 27 December 2003, after slipping into a coma. He was buried at All Saints' Church, Bradbourne in Derbyshire. Bates bequeathed companion and actress Joanna Pettet £95,000 (equivalent to £194,970 in 2026) upon his death. The two had been friends since 1964, and Pettet provided support and companionship during his final months after he had been diagnosed with pancreatic cancer in February 2003. Pettet was quoted as saying: "It was a very touching gesture because he had done everything while he was in hospital to make sure I would be looked after following his death."

== Otherwise Engaged: The Life of Alan Bates ==
Donald Spoto's 2007 book, Otherwise Engaged: The Life of Alan Bates, is a posthumous authorised biography of Alan Bates. It was written with the cooperation of his son Benedick and brother Martin, and features more than one hundred interviews, including with Michael Linnit and Rosalind Chatto.

== Tristan Bates Theatre ==
Bates and his family created the Tristan Bates Theatre at the Actors' Centre in Covent Garden, in memory of his son Tristan who died at the age of 19. Tristan's twin brother, Benedick, is a vice-director.

== Selected credits ==
FILM:

- The Entertainer (1960)
- Whistle Down the Wind (1961)
- A Kind of Loving (1962)
- The Caretaker (1963)
- The Running Man (1963)
- Nothing but the Best (1964)
- Zorba the Greek (1964)
- Georgy Girl (1966)
- King of Hearts (1966)
- Far from the Madding Crowd (1967)
- The Fixer (1968)
- Women in Love (1969)
- Three Sisters (1970)
- The Go-Between (1971)
- A Day in the Death of Joe Egg (1972)
- Butley (1974)
- In Celebration (1975)
- The Shout (1978)
- An Unmarried Woman (1978)
- The Rose (1979)
- The Return of the Soldier (1982)
- We Think the World of You (1988)
- Hamlet (1990)
- Gentlemen Don't Eat Poets (1995)
- The Cherry Orchard (1999)
- Gosford Park (2001)
- The Mothman Prophecies (2002)
- The Sum of All Fears (2002)

STAGE:

- Look Back in Anger (1956)
- Long Day's Journey into Night (1958)
- The Caretaker (1960)
- Butley (1971; 1973)
- Otherwise Engaged (1975)
- A Patriot for Me (1983)
- One for the Road (1984)
- Fortune's Fool (1996; 2002)

TELEVISION:

- The Mayor of Casterbridge (1978)
- A Voyage Round My Father (1982)
- An Englishman Abroad (1983)
- The Dog It Was That Died (1989)
- 102 Boulevard Haussmann (1991)
- Oliver's Travels (1995)
- Nicholas's Gift (1998)
- Love in a Cold Climate (2001)

^{‡}This mini-film was shown as part of a presentation on the anthology series, Screen Two.

== See also ==
- List of Academy Award winners and nominees from Great Britain
- List of actors in Royal Shakespeare Company productions
- List of actors with Academy Award nominations
- List of British actors
