= The Caretaker (1963 film) =

1963 British film by Clive Donner

- A poster bearing the film's alternative title: The Guest
- Directed by: Clive Donner
- Written by: Harold Pinter
- Produced by: Michael Birkett
- Starring: Alan Bates; Donald Pleasence; Robert Shaw
- Cinematography: Nicolas Roeg
- Edited by: Fergus McDonell
- Music by: Ron Grainer
- Release date: June 1963
- Running time: 105 minutes
- Country: United Kingdom
- Language: English
- Budget: £30,000

The Caretaker (also known as The Guest) is a 1963 British drama film directed by Clive Donner and starring Alan Bates, Donald Pleasence and Robert Shaw. It was based on the Harold Pinter play of the same name.

It was entered into the 13th Berlin International Film Festival where it won the Silver Bear Extraordinary Jury Prize.

== Plot ==
While renovating his home in London, Aston allows Davies, an old homeless man that he rescued from a fight, to live with him and offers him a job as property caretaker. Mick, Aston's younger brother, also offers Davies this job, and torments him both physically and psychologically. Aston gives Davies clothes and shoes. Aston eventually reveals that he was treated with electroconvulsive therapy years ago. Gradually, Davies becomes fed up with the living arrangement, and is told to leave by Aston. Davies goes to Mick, who he has proclaimed loyalty too, but, after an argument, also refuses to give him the job as caretaker. Davies then goes back to Aston to plead for the job, but Aston just stares at the shed he intends to renovate in the garden.

== Cast ==
- Alan Bates as Mick
- Donald Pleasence as Mac Davies / Bernard Jenkins
- Robert Shaw as Aston

== Production ==
The film was made by a partnership of six people, none of whom took payment: Clive Donner, Donald Pleasence, Alan Bates, Robert Shaw, Harold Pinter and Michael Birkett.

No distributor expressed interest in funding the film, which meant it was unable to attract investment from the National Film Finance Corporation, because it was unable to give money to projects without a reasonable chance of a commercial screening. The budget was eventually raised with the support of a consortium, credited in the film as being Peter Bridge, Peter Cadbury, Charles Kasher, Elizabeth Taylor, Richard Burton, Harry Saltzman, Peter Hall, Leslie Caron, Noël Coward and Peter Sellers, each member giving £1,000.

Composer Ron Grainer was tasked to produce not a score but a sequence of sound effects, often metallic in nature, but which also include the sound of a drip which occasionally falls from the attic ceiling and a squeak as Aston uses a screwdriver. Grainer used his previous experiences working with the BBC Radiophonic Workshop in the creation of the sound picture.

== Release ==
The film was unable to obtain a release in London until it first screened in New York.

== Reception ==
The Monthly Film Bulletin wrote: "With a screenplay by Pinter himself, and with two of the original cast repeating their stage performances on the screen, this is a very commendable example of the filmed play – worth making for the sake of bringing the authentic flavour of the original to a wider audience, and worth seeing if you missed it on the stage. Donald Pleasence's singularly vile tramp and Alan Bates's eccentric joker certainly deserve to be preserved on film, and Robert Shaw, playing the brain-washed philanthropist with hypnotic distinction, gives a performance no less wonderfully right. Between them, in fact, these three bring out all that seems to matter; it is always what they say and the way they say it that holds one in thrall."

According to Janet Moat, "the film is striking. Donner deploys a non-musical soundtrack, close-ups and two-shots to unsettling and menacing effect."
