= Timon of Athens (disambiguation) =

Timon of Athens is a play by William Shakespeare about the historical figure.

Timon of Athens may also refer to:

- Timon of Athens (person), a historical figure who lived during the era of the Peloponnesian War
- Timon of Athens (Thomas Shadwell), a rewrite of Shakespeare's original play by Thomas Shadwell
- Timon of Athens (painting), a c. 1767 painting by Nathaniel Dance-Holland
- BBC Television Shakespeare - Third Season - Timon of Athens (1981) directed by Jonathan Miller
