= Timon =

Timon is a masculine given name and a surname which may refer to:

== People ==
- Timon of Athens (person), 5th-century Athenian and legendary misanthrope
- Timon of Phlius (c. 320 BCE – c. 235 BCE), a Pyrrhonist philosopher of Ptolemaic Egypt and Hellenistic Greece
- Timon the Deacon, an early Christian leader
- Timon of Chaeronea, brother of Plutarch
- Timon Dobias (born 1989), Slovak footballer
- Timon Grancagnolo (born 2003), German luger
- Timon Gremmels (born 1976), German politician
- Timon Haugan (born 1996), Norwegian alpine skier
- Timon Parris (born 1995), American football player
- Timon Screech, British art historian
- Timon Wellenreuther (born 1995), German football goalkeeper
- John Timon (1797–1867), first Roman Catholic Bishop of Buffalo, New York
- Juan José Timón (1937–2001), Uruguayan Olympic cyclist

== Fictional characters ==
- the title character of Timon of Athens, a play by William Shakespeare
- the title character of The History of Timon of Athens the Man-hater, a rewrite of Shakespeare's original play by Thomas Shadwell
- Timon, a meerkat film and television character, originally from the film The Lion King
- Timon (Rome character), in the 2005 television series Rome
- Timon, one of the minor characters in the 2017 Netflix series, Big Mouth (American TV series).

== See also ==
- Tymon, name
- Timmons, name
- Chris Timons (born 1974), English footballer
