= Timon (disambiguation) =

Timon is a given name and surname.

Timon may also refer to:

- Timón (Madrid), a ward (barrio) of Madrid
- Timon, Maranhão, a town in the Brazilian state of Maranhão
- Timon, Louisiana, United States, an unincorporated community
- Timon (lizard), a genus of wall lizards, including Ocellated Lizard (Timon lepidus)
- Timon (film), a 1973 Croatian film based on Shakespeare's play
- Timon of Athens, a play by Shakespeare

== See also ==
- Timon of Athens (disambiguation)
