= The Burial at Thebes =

Play by Seamus Heaney

- Cover of the first edition
- Author: Seamus Heaney
- Language: English
- Genre: Tragedy
- Publisher: Faber and Faber
- Publication date: 2004
- Publication place: Ireland
- Pages: 58
- ISBN: 0-571-22361-3
- OCLC: 54505360

The Burial at Thebes: A version of Sophocles' Antigone is a play by Irish Nobel laureate Seamus Heaney, based on the fifth century BC tragedy Antigone by Sophocles. It is also an opera by Dominique Le Gendre.

== Plot ==
Antigone, the daughter of Oedipus King of Thebes, Greece, learns that her two brothers Polyneices and Eteocles have killed each other fighting on different sides of a war. Creon, Antigone's uncle and newly appointed King of Thebes, buries Eteocles, who fought on the Theban side of the war, hailing him as a great hero. He refuses to bury Polyneices, proclaiming that any who attempt to defy his wishes will be made an example of, on the grounds that he was a 'traitor' fighting on the opposing side in the war. The play opens with Antigone and her sister Ismene discussing what action to take in response to Creon's new law against the burial of their brother. Antigone is reactive, arguing that Creon is breaching Divine Law by denying burial to Polyneices. Despite Ismene's pleading, Antigone heads off alone to enact the burial rites both for her own glory and for the preservation of her brother's soul.

Antigone is caught defying her uncle's orders, and is punished severely despite being engaged to Creon's son Haemon. She is sealed within a tomb and left to die. After a visit from the oracle Tiresias warning of the consequences, Creon eventually repents, but by then she has killed herself and is followed in death by Creon's own son and wife, both of whom commit suicide. Creon's isolation is complete and he ends the play a broken and lonely man.

Central to the play are the conflicts between individual freedom and the imposition of restrictions by state, as well as the conflict between Divine Law and Civil Law.

The play contains many digressions from the Greek original, Heaney adding Irish idiom and expanding the involvement of some characters such as the Guard. Relevant to the time of its writing, Heaney also adds in "Bushisms", referencing George W. Bush and his approach to leadership, drawing a parallel between him and the character of Creon.

== Production ==
The play was first produced at the Abbey Theatre in April 2004 and later adapted as an opera, which premiered at the Globe Theatre in London in 2008, with music by Dominique Le Gendre and libretto by Heaney.

It includes a note from the writer comparing Creon with the foreign policies of the Bush administration.

== See also ==
- Antigone
- Oedipus at Colonus
- Oedipus Rex
