= Timmonds =

Timmonds is a surname, and may refer to:

- Henry Carroll Timmonds (1853–1913), Missouri politician and judge
- Mary Fletcher Timmonds mother of Dixie Cornell Gebhardt
- Audrey Timmonds character in Godzilla, most famously played by Maria Pitillo.

== See also ==
- Timmins
- Timmons
