= Kittredge Shakespeare =

Kittredge Shakespeare is a series of scholarly edited volumes of individual plays by William Shakespeare. The original series were edited by noted Shakespeare scholar George Lyman Kittredge of Harvard University. The series has been revised and updated twice in more recent years.

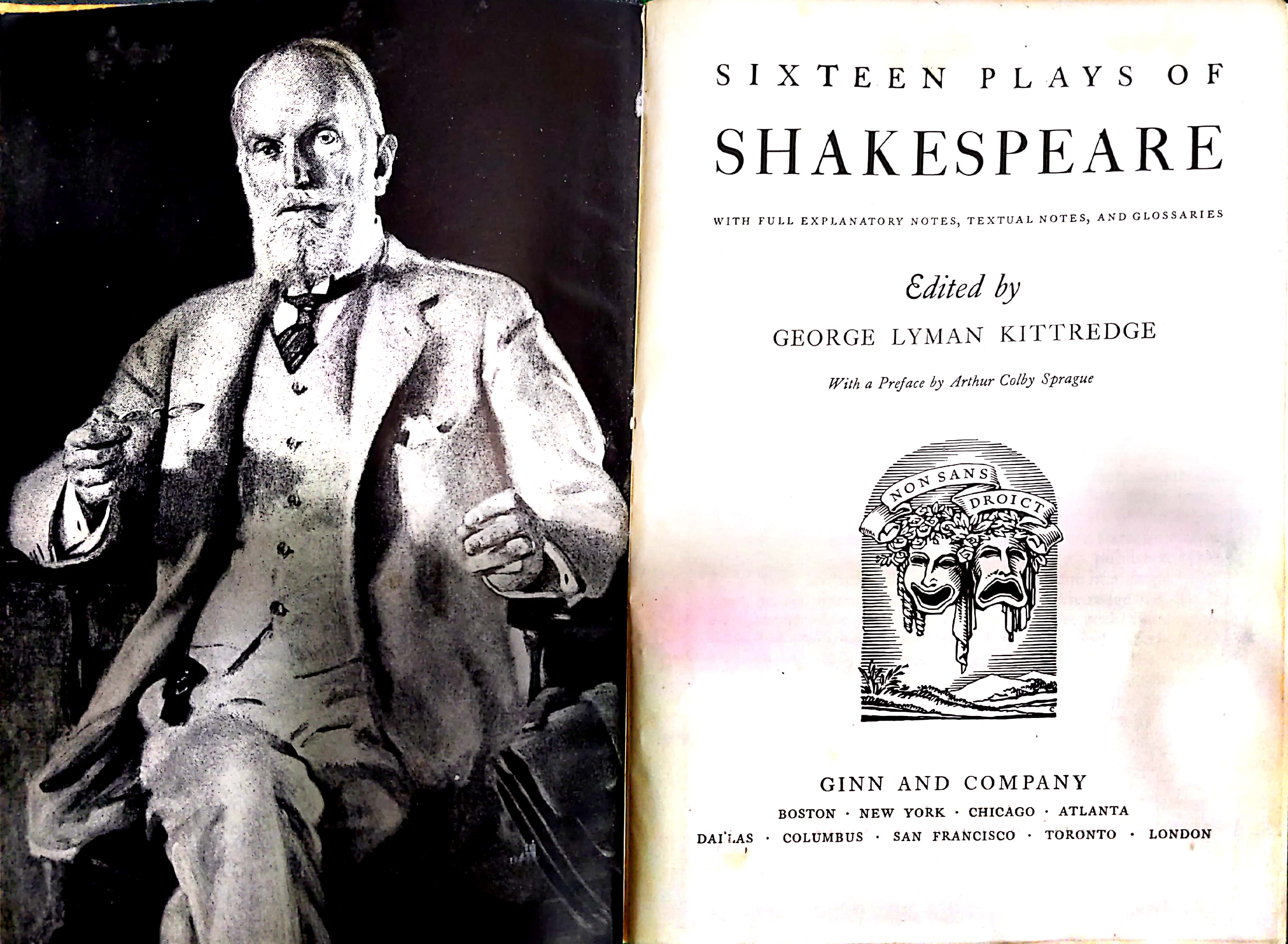
The first page in a 1946 edition of Sixteen Plays of Shakespeare

== Original series ==
George Kittredge born in 1860, was nearly 80 years old when the first volumes of Kittredge Shakespeare were published in 1939. The original series included text and analysis of sixteen of Shakespeare's Plays. Kittredge, who had taught Harvard undergraduates an introductory course on Shakespeare called English 2, had written very little on the subject, other than an address in 1916 at the Sanders Theater, before publishing his Complete Works in 1936 (see below) and the individual play series, starting in 1939. The original series included an introduction to each play, text of the play, copious literary notes following the text, textual notes, and a glossary. The original series included the following volumes:

Released 1939: As You Like It, Hamlet, Julius Caesar, Macbeth, and The Tempest.

Released 1940: Henry IV, part 1, King Lear, and Romeo and Juliet

Released 1941: Antony and Cleopatra, Othello, Richard The Second, and Twelfth Night.

Also released between 1939 and 1941: A Midsummer Night's Dream, Much Ado About Nothing

Released posthumously: Henry V, The Merchant of Venice

Kittredge died in July 1941 at age 81, and was working on the original series of these books until shortly before he passed. In 1945, Arthur Colby Sprague, of Bryn Mawr College, edited volumes for Henry V and The Merchant of Venice from Kittredge's explanatory notes.

Sixteen Plays of Shakespeare, with a preface by Arthur Colby Sprague, was released as a single volume in 1946. This collection includes the full introductions and all of the notes, textural notes and play glossaries found in each individual volume.

== Revised series ==
Between 1966 and 1969, all of Shakespeare's plays were reissued, revised by Irving Ribner. New introductions by Professor Ribner replaced Kittredge's originals, and the notes were set out as footnotes to the text, rather than following the text, as was the case in the original series.

== The New Kittredge ==
Starting in 2006 with Hamlet, a new series of single volume Shakespeare plays was released under the name The New Kitteridge. Under the general editorship of James H. Lake, the new Kittredge includes an edited version of Kittredge's original introductions, new introductions by the editors of each volume, two sets of footnotes below the text (one of literary notes, mostly from Kittredge, and a second set with a running commentary of performance and film treatments), followed by segments on ""How to Read 'the Play' as Performance", "Topics for Discussion and Further Study"; a bibliography; and a filmography.

== The Complete Works ==
Prior to publishing the individual plays in the individual series, Professor Kittredge issued a volume of the Complete Works of Shakespeare in 1936. As part of the Revised Series, The Complete Works was revised by Irving Ribner and reissued in 1971.
