= Complete Works of Shakespeare =

All plays and poems by William Shakespeare in one book

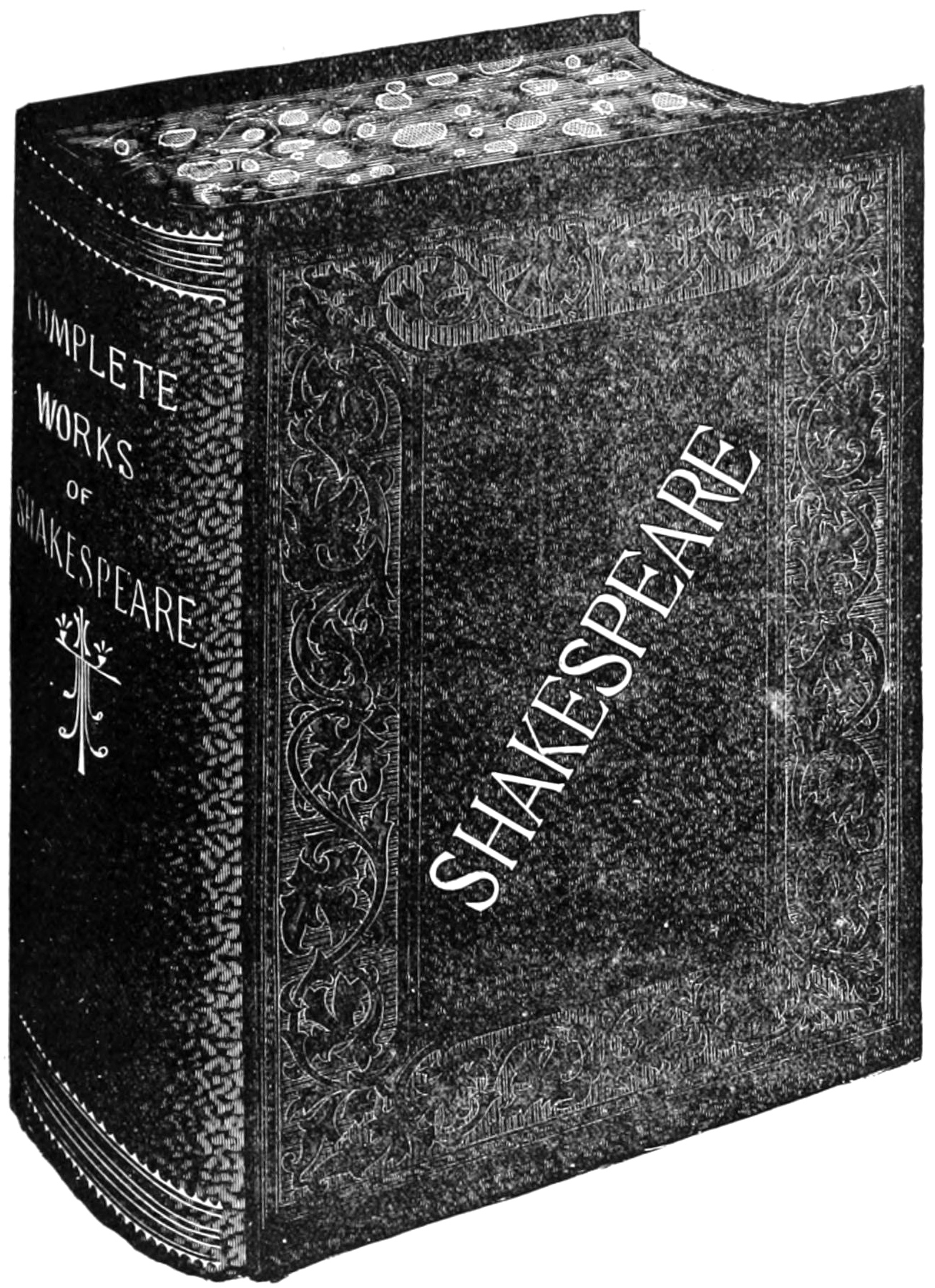

The Complete Works of William Shakespeare is the standard name given to any volume containing all the plays and poems of William Shakespeare. Some editions include several works that were not completely of Shakespeare's authorship (collaborative writings), such as The Two Noble Kinsmen, which was a collaboration with John Fletcher; Pericles, Prince of Tyre, the first two acts of which are likely to have been written by George Wilkins; or Edward III, whose authorship is disputed.

== Plays ==
These plays are generally classed into 3 main categories: histories, tragedies and comedies.

Comedies

- All's Well That Ends Well
- As You Like It
- The Comedy of Errors
- Cymbeline
- Love's Labour's Lost
- Measure for Measure
- The Merry Wives of Windsor
- The Merchant of Venice
- A Midsummer Night's Dream
- Much Ado About Nothing
- Pericles, Prince of Tyre
- The Taming of the Shrew
- The Tempest
- Troilus and Cressida
- Twelfth Night
- The Two Gentlemen of Verona
- The Two Noble Kinsmen
- The Winter's Tale

Histories

- King John
- Richard II
- Henry IV, Part 1
- Henry IV, Part 2
- Henry V
- Henry VI, Part 1
- Henry VI, Part 2
- Henry VI, Part 3
- Richard III
- Henry VIII
- Edward III

Tragedies

- Coriolanus
- Titus Andronicus
- Romeo and Juliet
- Timon of Athens
- Julius Caesar
- Macbeth
- Hamlet
- King Lear
- Othello
- Antony and Cleopatra

== Selected editions ==
The various editions of the Complete Works include a number of university press releases, as well as versions released from larger publishing companies. The Complete Works (especially in older editions) are often sought after by book collectors, and a number of binderies and publishing houses have produced leather bound and gilded releases for luxury book collecting.

Both mainstream and academic publishing companies have released multiple editions and versions of their own collections of Shakespeare's work, often updated periodically. Multiple editors contribute to the processes of laying out the Complete Works, and many times either the main editor, publishing company, or university's name is included in the title. (For instance, the Complete Works published by the Arden company is often referred to as the Arden Shakespeare, and the edition produced by Yale University called the Yale Shakespeare.)

=== Published editions ===
- Arden – The Complete Works (Arden Shakespeare), The Arden Shakespeare Complete Works ("Arden Shakespeare")
- Black Dog & Leventhal – William Shakespeare: The Complete Works (4 vol.)
- CRW Publishing Ltd. – The Complete Works of William Shakespeare
- Gramercy – William Shakespeare: The Complete Works, William Shakespeare: The Complete Works [Deluxe Edition], The Globe Illustrated Shakespeare: Complete Works, The Globe Illustrated Shakespeare: The Complete Works Annotated
- HarperCollins – The Complete Works of William Shakespeare: The Alexander Text, Complete Works of William Shakespeare (Ed. 1–4)
- Kittredge Shakespeare, The Complete Works of Shakespeare, edited by George Lyman Kittredge, Ginn & Co. 1936 (revised by Irving Ribner and reissued 1971)
- Longman – The Complete Works of Shakespeare (Ed. 1–7)
- Modern Library – William Shakespeare: Complete Works
- Palgrave Macmillan – The RSC Shakespeare: The Complete Works
- Penguin Books – World of Shakespeare: The Complete Plays and Sonnets of William Shakespeare (38 Volume Library) (38 vol.)
  - Penguin Classics – The Complete Pelican Shakespeare
- Riverside – The Riverside Shakespeare (Ed. 1–2) ("Riverside Shakespeare")
- Wordsworth Editions Ltd. – The Complete Works of William Shakespeare, The Complete Works of William Shakespeare [Special/Royals], The Complete Works of Shakespeare [Children's Classics], Complete Works of William Shakespeare (3 vol.)

=== Academic editions ===
- The Cambridge Shakespeare (Cambridge University Press, Doubleday, Garden City, Houghton Mifflin, Octopus Books, RH Value)
- The Oxford Shakespeare
- Yale Shakespeare

== See also ==
- Arkangel Shakespeare
- The Complete Works of William Shakespeare (Abridged) – a slapstick sped-up version by the Reduced Shakespeare Company
- List of works by William Shakespeare
