= Timmins (disambiguation) =

Timmins is a city in the Canadian province of Ontario.

Timmins may also refer to:

- Timmins (surname)
- Timmins (federal electoral district), a defunct Ontario federal election district
- Timmins (provincial electoral district) a current Ontario Provincial election district.
- HMCS Timmins (K223), a Flower-class corvette of the Royal Canadian Navy
