= Timmins (surname) =

Timmins (/ˈtɪmɪns/ TIM-inss) is a surname which originated in a number of different countries. It is found mainly in Great Britain, Ireland, America, Canada, Australia and New Zealand. In England, the largest concentration of the name exists in the West Midlands; variants of the name include Timmings and Timmons. An early example of the name can be found in the Subsidy Rolls of Sussex (1332) - Richard Tymyng. In Ireland, it is mainly an anglicisation of the Gaelic surnames Toimín from Leinster and Ó Tiomáin from Ulster.

== Notable people with the surname ==
- Cali Timmins (born 1963), Canadian actress
- Charlie Timmins (1922–2010), English footballer
- Conor Timmins (born 1998), Canadian ice hockey player
- Margo Timmins (born 1961), Canadian musician
- Michael Timmins (born 1959), Canadian musician
- Noah Timmins (1867–1936), Canadian mining pioneer
- Peter Timmins (born 1965), Canadian musician
- Romy Timmins (born 1989), Australian rules footballer
- Sam Timmins (born 1997), New Zealand basketball player
- Sammy Timmins (1879–1956), English footballer
- Samuel Timmins (1826–1902), English scholar and antiquarian
- Shaun Timmins (born 1976), Australian rugby league footballer

== Fictional characters ==
- Stingray Timmins, a character in the Australian soap opera Neighbours
- "A Little Dinner at Timmins's", a novel by William Makepeace Thackeray

== See also ==
- Timmons
