= Pauline Delaney =

Irish actress (1925–2007)

- Born: Pauline Delaney; 8 June 1925; Dublin, Ireland
- Died: 15 January 2007 (aged 81); London, England
- Occupation: actress
- Years active: 1954–2005

Pauline Delaney (8 June 1925 – 15 January 2007) was an Irish theatre, television and film actress.

== Early life ==
Delaney was born in the Dublin suburb of Drumcondra, one of the two children of Kathleen (née Loughrey) and Frank Delaney, a Guinness brewery worker.

== Career ==
After leaving school Delaney worked as a trainee fashion buyer, and attended the Brendan Smith Academy of Acting in Dublin. She began acting professionally with a touring production of Charley's Aunt and was an early member of the Dublin Globe Theatre company.

Between 1958 and 1995 she appeared in 13 feature films including The Quare Fellow (1962) and Young Cassidy (1965), and made over 70 TV appearances from 1962 to 2005 in plays and popular series including Z-Cars, Public Eye, The Bill, Rumpole of the Bailey and Casualty. In credits her surname is sometimes spelled "Delany".

== Personal life ==
Delaney was married twice: first, in 1954, to the Irish actor Norman Rodway, and later to the scriptwriter Gerry Simpson, who died shortly before herself. Delaney died from Parkinson's disease on 8 June 2007.

== Filmography ==
* credited as Pauline Delany

- Turas Téarnaimh (Voyage to Recovery) (short, 1954) – Brefni O Ruairc (as Póilín Ni Dúbhshlaine)
- Rooney (1958) – Mrs. Wall*
- Innocent Sinners (1958) — Mrs. Malone*
- A Question of Suspense (1961) – Mrs. Barlow*
- Ambush in Leopard Street (1962) – Cath*
- The Quare Fellow (1962) – Mickser's wife
- The Very Edge (1963) – Selina's Mother
- Nothing But the Best (1964) – Mrs. March
- Young Cassidy (1965) – Bessie Ballynoy*
- Percy (1971) – Sister Flanagan*
- The Love Ban (1973) – Mrs Hale*
- Brannigan – Mrs Cooper*
- Trenchcoat (1983) – Lizzie O'Reily*
- Circle of Friends (1995) – Big House maid*

== Television appearances ==
* credited as Pauline Delany

- The Face They See (1962) – Gladys Dutton*
- BBC Sunday-Night Play, "The Fly Sham" (1963) – Monica Field*
- The Avengers, "The Golden Eggs" (1963) – Elizabeth Bayle
- The Informer, "Don't Call Us, We'll Call You" – Mrs Morell*
- Armchair Theatre, "The Push Over" (1963) – Lottie
- Armchair Theatre, "A Kind of Kingdom" (1963)
- Z-Cars, "Police Work" (1963) – Madelaine Davis
- No Hiding Place, "One Redeeming Feature" (1964) – Mrs Nash*
- Theatre 625, "Carried by Storm" (1964) – Flag Annie*
- ITV Play of the Week, "A Tank of Fish" (1965) – Doll
- No Hiding Place, "Calculated Risk" (1965) – Rose*
- The Villains, "See No Evil" (1965) – Pauline Tyler
- Comedy Playhouse, "The Time and Motion Man" (1965) – Lilian French*
- Theatre 625, "Esther's Altar" (1965) – Christina Swords
- Public Eye, 11 episodes (1965–1975) – Janet Benjamin/Mrs Jessup/Mrs Helen Mortimer
- Double Image, "Impossible Odds" – The Waitress (1966)
- Armchair Theatre, "Love Life" (1967) – Josie Hanrahan*
- Love Story, "Out of Sight, Out of Mind" (1967) – Sally Turpin
- Vendetta, "The Scandal Man" – Serafina di Benco*
- The Avengers, "The £50,000 Breakfast" (1967) – Mrs Rhodes*
- The Wednesday Play, "A Crucial Week in the Life of a Grocer's Assistant" (1967) – Mrs Mullins*
- Theatre 625, "Albinos in Black" (1968) – Lena Ryan
- Softly Softly, "Unfinished Business" (1968) – Mrs Coke
- Detective, "Crime of Passion" (1968) – Belle Elmore
- Z-Cars, "What D'Yer Mean – Charity?" Parts 1 and 2 (1968) – Else Farrell
- BBC Films for Television Training, "Television Production Planning" (1968) – self
- The Expert, "It Can't Be Done" (1968) – Penny Goodwin*
- The Wednesday Play, "The Retreat" (1968) – Petra
- The Wednesday Play, "Bam! Pow! Zap!" (1969) – May Trapnell
- The Mind of Mr. J.G. Reeder, "The Green Mamba" (1969) – Madame Lemaire*
- ITV Playhouse, "Murder: Identikit" (1969) – Mrs Lucan*
- ITV Playhouse, "Uncle Jonathan" (1969) – Catherine Robertson
- The Expert, "Playing with Fire" (1969) – Nurse Reynolds*
- The Misfit, "On Management and Labour" (1970) – Ivy
- Dickson of Dock Green, "The Stranger" (1970) – Mrs Ross
- ITV Saturday Night Theatre, "The Policeman and the Cook" (1970) – Mrs Crosscapel*
- ITV Saturday Night Theatre, "The Dead" (1970) – Gretta Conroy*
- 2nd House, "Never Give a Sucker an Even Break" (1970) – Mrs Kernan in Grace*
- Crimes of Passion, "Emilie" (1970) – Therese Fournier
- The Sinners, "The Highwayman and the Saint" (1971) – Madge Wilson
- The Playboy of the Western World (1971) – Widow Kwin
- New Scotland Yard, "The Money Game" (1972) – Audrey Miller
- Six Days of Justice, "With Intent to Deceive" (1972) – Laura Trafford*
- BBC2 Play of the Month, "Stephen D" (1972) – Dante*
- 7 of 1, "Another Fine Mess" (1973) – Edwina*
- Orson Welles Great Mysteries, "La Grande Breteche" (1973) – Madame Lerpas*
- Stage 2, "The Shadow of a Gunman" (1973) – Mrs Grigson*
- Z Cars, "Absence" (1974) – Mrs Dance
- Z Cars, "Unnecessary Force" (1974) – Ruby Kowalski
- Crown Court, "The Dogs Next Door" Parts 1–3 (1974) – Carmel Bessemer*
- Crown Court, "Evil Liver" (1975) – Barbara Ecclestone
- Play For Today, "Your Man from Six Counties" (1976) – teacher
- BBC2 Playhouse, "The Achurch Letters" (1977) – Jenny Patterson*
- BBC2 Play of the Week, "The Kitchen" (1977) – Anne
- BBC2 Play of the Month, "The Seagull" (1978) – Polina*
- Fallen Hero, S1E6 (1978) – Martha Simpson*
- Mixed Blessings, 12 episodes (1978–1980) – Mrs Beasley*
- Hazell, "Hazell Gets the Boot" (1979) – sister
- A Celebration of Sean O'Casey, "Red Roses for Me" (1980) – Mrs Breydon
- Shoestring, "Mocking Bird" (1980) – Mrs Bazely
- Hammer House of Horror, "The Two Faces of Evil" (1980) – sister
- Dangerous Davies: The Last Detective (1981) – Doris Davies
- Maybury, "Maisie and Mac" and "Maisie" (1981) – Maisie
- Bergerac, "Fall of a Birdman" (1983) – landlady
- The Mourning Thief (1984) – Auntie Deirdre*
- Late Starter, 3 episodes (1985) – Peggy Haddow
- Travellers by Night, 3 episodes (1985) – Mrs O'Hara
- Bookmark, "Beckett at 80" (1986) – self
- A Taste for Death, 2 episodes (1988) – Mrs Nolan
- Bluebirds, 6 episodes (1989) – Ivy Longford*
- How We Used to Live, 3 episodes (1990) – Peggy*
- The Bill, "The Strong Survive" (1989) – Mrs Murphy
- The Bill, "Friday...and Counting" (1991) – Mrs Jarvis
- Rumpole of the Bailey, "Rumpole a la Carte" (1991) – Mrs Rafferty*
- Casualty, "Facing Up" (1991) – Mona Drekon*
- Moving Story, "Norman Blood" (1995) – Mrs Reynolds
- Spywatch (1996) – Mrs Calver
- Mrs. Brown's Boys, "Believe it or Not" (2004) and "Good Mourning Mrs Brown" (2005) – woman with missionaries*

== Selected theatre credits ==
The main source for this section is Theatricalia.

- Will Success Spoil Rock Hunter? (1960–1961). Gate Theatre, Dublin.
- The Poker Session (1963–1964) – Irene. Gate Theatre, Dublin and Globe (now Gielgud Theatre), London.
- King of the Castle (1964). Gaiety Theatre, London.
- The Last Hero (1987). Peacock Theatre, Dublin.
- Juno and the Paycock (1989) – Mrs Tancred. National Theatre, London.
- Man, Beast and Virtue (1989–1990) – Grazia. National Theatre, London.
- Philadelphia Here I Come (1992) – Madge, Wyndham’s Theatre, London.
- The Hostage (1994–1995). Barbican Theatre, London.
- Uncle Vanya (1995) – Marya. Tricycle Theatre, London.
