= Ambush in Leopard Street =

1962 British film by J. Henry Piperno

- UK quad
- Directed by: J. Henry Piperno
- Written by: Ahmed Faroughy; Bernard Spicer
- Produced by: Bill Luckwell; Jock MacGregor
- Starring: James Kenney; Michael Brennan; Bruce Seton
- Cinematography: Stephen Dade
- Edited by: Norman Cohen
- Music by: Wilfred Burns
- Production companies: Bill and Michael Luckwell Ltd.
- Distributed by: British Lion-Columbia Distributors (UK) (as BLC Films Ltd.)
- Release date: 1962
- Running time: 72 mins
- Country: United Kingdom
- Language: English

Ambush in Leopard Street is a low budget 1962 British 'B' black and white crime film directed by J. Henry Piperno and starring James Kenney, Michael Brennan and Bruce Seton. It was written by Ahmed Faroughy and Bernard Spicer.

== Premise ==
Harry is a small time crook who plans one last job before he retires, but things do not go quite according to plan. With his sidekick Nimmo, the plan is to ambush a truck containing £500,000 of diamonds in Leopard Street, but heavy security means recruiting a larger criminal gang than usual, and the inexperienced newcomers may derail Harry's scheme.

== Cast ==
- James Kenney as Johnny
- Michael Brennan as Harry
- Bruce Seton as Nimmo
- Norman Rodway as Kegs
- Jean Harvey as Jean
- Pauline Delaney as Cath
- Marie Conmee as Myra
- Charles Mitchell as Big George
- Lawrence Crain as Danny
- Muriel O'Hanlon as Lily
- Sheila Donald as Val
- Jack O'Reilly as Hibbs

== Critical reception ==
The Monthly Film Bulletin wrote: "Even the climax, the actual ambush, lacks punch in this routine and unconvincing crime thriller. The acting is adequate, but suffers from confined production and a more than usually weak story."

Kine Weekly described the film as: "a dicy British 'second'."

Chibnall and McFarlane in The British 'B' Film called the film an "impoverished crook drama."

In Forgotten British Film: Value and the Ephemeral in Postwar Cinema Philip Gillet wrote: "[J. Henry Piperno's] direction can be pedestrian, the fight between the two gangs being cursory and clumsy, though constraints on time and budget doubtless contributed to this. The language of the cockney villains sounds contrived, but what the film has in its favour is a story with the stark simplicity of Greek tragedy: man uses woman, man becomes emotionally involved with her, man lets her down."

== Home media ==
The film was released on DVD in 2013.
