= Arkangel Shakespeare =

Series of audio drama presentations of William Shakespeare's plays

The Complete Arkangel Shakespeare is a notable series of audio-drama presentations of 38 of William Shakespeare's 39 plays.

== Description ==
The Complete Arkangel Shakespeare is a notable series of audio drama presentations of 38 of William Shakespeare's 39 plays. (Note: The series does not include Edward III, as that play has only recently been accepted, albeit with some dissent, as part of the Shakespeare canon.) The recordings were released from 1998 onwards, first on audio cassette and then later on CD.

The plays are unabridged and based on The Complete Pelican Shakespeare, published by Penguin Classics. The music for all the plays was written and produced by composer Dominique Le Gendre. The production features nearly 400 actors, almost all past or present members of the Royal Shakespeare Company.

The Complete Arkangel Shakespeare won the 2004 Audie Award for "Best Audio Drama".

The logo on the box cover features a figure of Shakespeare composed entirely from books, reminiscent of the Renaissance Italian painting The Librarian by Giuseppe Arcimboldo.

The project spanned five years and cost $3 million. The series represents the collective vision of four individuals: Tom Treadwell, a Shakespeare scholar; Bill Shepherd, a film producer; Clive Brill, producer and director at the BBC; and Dominique Le Gendre, a composer.

The Complete Arkangel Shakespeare was published by Audio Partners.

The cast members of each play are listed below.

== All's Well That Ends Well ==
- Emily Woof – Helena
- Sam West – Bertram
- Edward de Souza – Parolles
- Maggie Steed – Countess
- Clive Swift – King of France
- Denys Hawthorne – Lafew
- Aidan Gillett – Lavatch
- Nicholas Murchie - Interpreter
- John Warnaby - First French Lord
- Michael Higgs - Second French Lord
- Rebecca Saire – Diana
- Jenny Howe – Widow
- Gavin Muir - Duke of Florence
- Charlotte Harvey - Mariana
- Scott Cherry - Messenger

== Antony and Cleopatra ==
- Ciarán Hinds – Antony
- Estelle Kohler – Cleopatra
- Ian Hughes – Octavius Caesar
- David Burke – Domitius Enobarbus
- Eve Matheson – Charmian
- Emma Gregory – Iras
- Alisdair Simpson – Dolabella
- Tracy-Ann Oberman – Octavia
- Trevor Martin – Lepidus
- Christopher Luscombe – Mardian
- Charlie Simpson – Pompey
- Jonathan Tafler – Menas
- John McAndrew – Eros
- Steve Hodson - Philo
- Arthur Cox - Soothsayer
- Michael N. Harbour - Menecrates
- Mark Bonnar - Scarus
- Will Keen - Diomedes
- Gary Bakewell - Cleopatra's messenger
- Richard Durden - Alexas

== As You Like It ==
- Niamh Cusack – Rosalind
- Stephen Mangan – Orlando
- Victoria Hamilton – Celia
- Ian Pepperell - Silvius
- Jonathan Tafler – Oliver
- Sarah-Jane Holm – Audrey
- Gerard Murphy – Jacques
- Clarence Smith – Touchstone
- Philip Voss – Duke Senior
- Hugh Ross – Duke Frederick
- Carolyn Backhouse – Phebe
- Raymond Bowers – Corin
- John Hollis – Adam
- Chook Sibtain - Amiens
- Sean Baker - Le Beau
- Matthew Morgan - Charles the wrestler
- Mark Lambert - Lord
- Duncan Bell - Jaques de Boys

== The Comedy of Errors ==
- David Tennant – Antipholus of Syracuse
- Brendan Coyle – Antipholus of Ephesus
- Alan Cox – Dromio of Syracuse
- Jason O'Mara – Dromio of Ephesus
- Niamh Cusack – Adriana
- Sorcha Cusack – Luciana
- Trevor Peacock – Egeon
- Helen Ryan – Abbess
- Dermot Crowley - Duke of Ephesus
- Pauline McLynn - Courtesan
- Lloyd Hutchison - Angelo
- Robert Donovan - First Merchant
- Tom Farrelly - Balthazar
- Donna Ansley - Luce

== Coriolanus ==
- Paul Jesson – Coriolanus
- Marjorie Yates – Volumnia
- Ewan Hooper – Menenius
- Martin Marquez – Aufidius
- Shirley Dixon – Valeria

== Cymbeline ==
- Jack Shepherd – Cymbeline
- Sophie Thompson – Imogen
- Ben Porter – Posthumus
- Stephen Moore - Belarius
- Ron Cook – Iachimo
- Stephen Mangan – Cloten
- Suzanne Bertish – The Queen
- Ian Hughes - Arviragus
- Will Keen - Guiderius
- James Greene - Pisanio
- Charlie Woods - Philario
- Max Bonamy - Soothsayer
- Rupert Mason - Senator
- Annabel Capper - Lady
- James Reynard - Messenger
- Julius Barnett - Jailer

== Hamlet ==
- Simon Russell Beale – Hamlet
- Imogen Stubbs – Ophelia
- Jane Lapotaire – Gertrude
- Bob Peck – Claudius
- Norman Rodway – Polonius
- Paul Jesson – The Ghost/Gravedigger
- Alan Cox – Horatio
- Damian Lewis – Laertes

== Henry IV, Part I ==
- Julian Glover – Henry IV
- Jamie Glover – Prince Hal
- Richard Griffiths – Sir John Falstaff
- Alan Cox – Hotspur
- Elizabeth Spriggs – Mistress Quickly
- Jane Slavin – Lady Percy

== Henry IV, Part II ==
- Julian Glover – Henry IV
- Jamie Glover – Prince Hal
- Richard Griffiths – Sir John Falstaff
- Peter Jeffrey – Northumberland
- Elizabeth Spriggs – Mistress Quickly
- Edward de Souza – Pistol
- Sidney Livingstone – Bardolph
- Geoffrey Bayldon – Shallow
- Christian Rodska – Silence, Lord Chief Justice
- Eve Matheson – Doll Tearsheet
- Chris Pavlo – Page

== Henry V ==
- Jamie Glover – Henry V
- Brian Cox – Chorus
- Ian Hughes – Fluellen
- Bill Nighy – King of France
- Alan Cox – Mountjoy
- Elizabeth Spriggs – The Hostess
- Edward de Souza – Pistol

== Henry VI, Part I ==
- David Tennant – Henry VI
- Norman Rodway – Duke of Gloucester
- John Bowe – Talbot
- Amanda Root – Joan of Arc
- Isla Blair – Countess
- Clive Merrison – York
- Kelly Hunter - Margaret
- Nigel Cooke - Suffolk
- Steve Hodson - Winchester
- Raymond Bowers - Burgundy
- Nicholas Rowe - Bastard of Orleans, Porter
- David Yelland - Charles the Dauphin
- Michael N. Harbour - Somerset
- John Hollis - Reignier, Vernon
- Trevor Martin - Mortimer
- Christopher Benjamin - Bedford, Lucy
- Mark Lambert - Alençon
- Anthony Jackson - Exeter

== Henry VI, Part II ==
- David Tennant – Henry VI
- Clive Merrison – York
- John Bowe – Warwick
- Kelly Hunter – Queen Margaret
- Norman Rodway – Duke of Gloucester
- Isla Blair – Duchess of Gloucester
- David Troughton – Richard Plantagenet
- Kenneth Cranham – Jack Cade
- Jamie Glover – Young Clifford

== Henry VI, Part III ==
- David Tennant – Henry VI
- Clive Merrison – York
- John Bowe – Warwick
- Kelly Hunter – Queen Margaret
- David Troughton – Richard of Gloucester
- Stephen Boxer – Edward IV
- Jamie Glover – Clifford

== Henry VIII ==
- Paul Jesson – Henry VIII
- Jane Lapotaire – Queen Katherine
- Timothy West – Cardinal Wolsey
- Anton Lesser – Duke of Norfolk
- David Yelland - Duke of Buckingham
- Steve Hodson - Cranmer
- Ian Gelder - Duke of Suffolk
- Michael N. Harbour - Cranmer
- Sean Baker – Prologue/Epilogue
- Katharine Schlesinger – Anne Bullen
- Maria Charles - Old Lady
- Alan Westaway - Lord Abergavenny
- Stephen Mangan - Earl of Surrey
- John McAndrew - Doctor Butts
- Alan Cox - Bishop of Lincoln
- Nicholas Rowe - Lovell

== Julius Caesar ==
- Michael Feast – Julius Caesar
- John Bowe – Marcus Brutus
- Adrian Lester – Marcus Antonius
- Geoffrey Whitehead – Cassius
- Estelle Kohler – Portia

== King John ==
- Michael Feast – King John
- Michael Maloney – Philip the Bastard
- Eileen Atkins – Constance
- Margaret Robertson – Elinor
- Bill Nighy – Cardinal Pandolph
- Trevor Peacock – Hubert
- Geoffrey Whitehead – King Philip

== King Lear ==
- Trevor Peacock – Lear
- Anton Lesser – Kent
- Penny Downie – Goneril
- Samantha Bond – Regan
- Julia Ford – Cordelia
- Gerard Murphy – Edmund
- David Tennant – Edgar
- Clive Merrison – Gloucester
- John Rogan – The Fool

== Love's Labour's Lost ==
- Greg Wise – King of Navarre
- Samantha Bond – Princess of France
- Alex Jennings – Berowne
- Alan Howard – Don Armado
- Emma Fielding – Rosaline
- John Warnaby - Dumaine
- Jonathan Tafler - Longaville
- Katherine Schlesinger - Katherine
- Susan Rice - Maria
- David Horovitch - Holofernes
- Kenneth Jay - Nathaniel
- John Dallimore - Dull
- Max Bonamy - Costard
- Emily Raymond - Jaquenetta
- Nicholas Woodeson - Boyet
- Stephen O’Neill - Moth/Mote

== Macbeth ==
- Hugh Ross – Macbeth
- Harriet Walter – Lady Macbeth
- John Bowe – Banquo
- Gary Bakewell – Macduff
- Sean Baker – Ross
- Mark Bonnar – Malcolm
- David Tennant – The Porter

== Measure for Measure ==
- Roger Allam – The Duke of Vienna
- Simon Russell Beale – Angelo
- Stella Gonet – Isabella
- Jonathan Firth – Claudio
- Stephen Mangan – Lucio
- Desmond Barrit – Pompey
- Emily Bruni - Mariana
- Christopher Benjamin – Escalus
- Christian Rodska - Provost
- Patricia Brake - Mistress Overdone
- Lloyd Hutchinson - Elbow
- David Cardy - Abhorson
- David Killick - Friar Peter
- Abigail Docherty - Juliet
- Ian Gelder - Barnardine
- Chris Pavlo - Froth
- Shirley Dixon - Nun
- Robert Portal - Friar Thomas

== The Merchant of Venice ==
- Bill Nighy – Antonio
- Trevor Peacock – Shylock
- Julian Rhind-Tutt – Bassanio
- Haydn Gwynne – Portia
- David Tennant – Launcelot Gobbo
- Alison Reid – Nerissa
- Geoffrey Whitehead – The Duke/Tubal
- Will Keen - Gratiano
- Sarah-Jane Holm - Jessica
- Matthew Delamere - Lorenzo

== The Merry Wives of Windsor ==
- Dinsdale Landen – Sir John Falstaff
- Sylvestra Le Touzel – Mistress Ford
- Penny Downie – Mistress Page
- Nicholas Woodeson – Ford
- Clive Swift – Justice Shallow

== A Midsummer Night's Dream ==
- David Harewood – Oberon
- Adjoa Andoh – Titania
- Richard McCabe – Puck
- Paul Shelley - Theseus
- Sophie Heyman - Hippolyta
- Geoffrey Whitehead - Egeus, Philostrate
- Roy Hudd – Bottom
- Richard Cordery - Quince
- Amanda Root – Hermia
- Saskia Wickham – Helena
- Rupert Penry-Jones – Lysander
- Clarence Smith – Demetrius

== Much Ado About Nothing ==
- Saskia Reeves – Beatrice
- Samuel West – Benedick
- Paul Jesson – Don Pedro
- Jason O'Mara – Claudio
- Abigail Docherty – Hero
- Bryan Pringle – Dogberry
- Steve Hodson – Don John

== Othello ==
- Don Warrington – Othello
- David Threlfall – Iago
- Anne-Marie Duff – Desdemona
- Suzanne Bertish – Emelia
- Jasper Britton – Cassio
- Stephen Mangan – Roderigo
- Clive Swift - Brabantio
- Julian Glover – The Duke of Venice
- Tracy-Ann Oberman - Bianca
- Will Keen - Montano
- Chris Crooks - Gratiano
- Alan David - Lodovico
- Mark Bonnar - Clown
- James Greene - Herald
- Jonathan Tafler - Messenger

== Pericles, Prince of Tyre ==
- Sir John Gielgud – John Gower
- Nigel Terry – Pericles
- Stella Gonet – Thaisa
- Julie Cox – Marina

== Richard II ==
- Rupert Graves – Richard II
- Julian Glover – Henry IV
- John Wood – John of Gaunt
- Isla Blair – Duchess of Gloucester
- Saira Todd – Queen Isabel
- John Nettleton – York
- Peter Jeffrey - Northumberland
- Rupert Penry-Jones - Aumerle
- Steve Hodson - Mowbray
- Edward de Souza - Carlisle
- Susan Brown - Duchess of York
- Geoffrey Bayldon - Gardener
- Alan Cox - Percy

== Richard III ==
- David Troughton – Richard
- Philip Voss – Buckingham
- Sonia Ritter – Queen Elizabeth
- Saskia Wickham – Lady Anne
- Margaret Robertson – Queen Margaret
- John McAndrew – Clarence/Lovell
- Stephen Boxer – Edward IV/Oxford
- David Tennant – The Archbishop/Ghost of Henry VI

== Romeo and Juliet ==
- Joseph Fiennes – Romeo
- Maria Miles – Juliet
- Elizabeth Spriggs – Nurse
- David Tennant – Mercutio
- Trevor Peacock – Capulet
- Jonathan Tafler – Tybalt/The Apothecary
- Clive Swift – Friar Laurence/Chorus

== The Taming of the Shrew ==
- Roger Allam – Petruchio
- Frances Barber – Kate
- Alan Cox – Lucentio
- Clarence Smith – Tranio
- Michael Higgs – Grumio
- Sean Baker - Christopher Sly, Baptista Minola
- Elizabeth O'Brien - Bianca
- Charles Simpson - Hortensio
- John Hollis - Gremio
- Keith Drinkel - Vincentio, Lord
- Richard Pearce - Biondello

== The Tempest ==
- Bob Peck – Prospero
- Adrian Lester – Ariel
- Richard McCabe – Caliban
- Jennifer Ehle – Miranda
- Jamie Glover – Ferdinand
- Simon Russell Beale – Antonio
- Arthur Cox – Stephano
- Desmond Barrit – Trinculo
- Anjoa Andoh - Iris

== Timon of Athens ==
- Alan Howard – Timon
- Norman Rodway – Apemantus
- Damian Lewis – Alcibiades
- John McAndrew – Flavius

== Titus Andronicus ==
- David Troughton – Titus
- Harriet Walter – Tamora
- Paterson Joseph – Aaron
- David Burke – Marcus
- Ian Hughes – Saturninus
- Emma Gregory – Lavinia
- Nicholas Murchie – Bassianus
- Charlie Simpson – Demetrius
- John McAndrew – Chiron
- Will Keen – Lucius

== Troilus and Cressida ==
- Ian Pepperell – Troilus
- Julia Ford – Cressida
- Norman Rodway – Pandarus
- Gerard Murphy – Ulysses
- David Troughton – Thersites

== Twelfth Night ==
- Niamh Cusack – Viola
- Amanda Root – Olivia
- Paterson Joseph – Feste
- Julian Glover – Malvolio
- Jonathan Firth – Orsino
- Dinsdale Landen – Sir Toby Belch
- Richard Cordery – Sir Andrew Aguecheek
- Will Keen – Sebastian
- Maggie McCarthy – Maria
- Alex Lowe – Antonio

== The Two Gentlemen of Verona ==
- Michael Maloney – Proteus
- Damian Lewis – Valentine
- Lucy Robinson – Julia
- Saskia Wickham – Silvia
- John Woodvine – Launce
- Nicholas Murchie – Speed
- Trevor Martin – Duke of Milan
- Desmond Barrit – Sir Thurio
- Andrew Alston – Sir Eglamour
- Sarah-Jane Holm – Lucetta

== The Two Noble Kinsmen ==
- Jonathan Firth – Palamon
- Nigel Cooke – Arcite
- Helen Schlesinger – Emilia
- Geoffrey Whitehead – Theseus
- Sarah-Jane Holm – The Gaoler's Daughter
- Simon Russell Beale – Prologue and Epilogue
- Anjoa Andoh - Hippolyta

== The Winter's Tale ==
- Ciarán Hinds – Leontes
- Sinéad Cusack – Hermione
- Eileen Atkins – Paulina
- Paul Jesson – Polixenes
- Geoffrey Whitehead – Camillo
- Alex Jennings – Autolycus
- Julian Glover – Antigonus
- Sir John Gielgud – Time, the Chorus

== See also ==
- Complete Works of Shakespeare
