= Apemantus =

Character in Timon of Athens

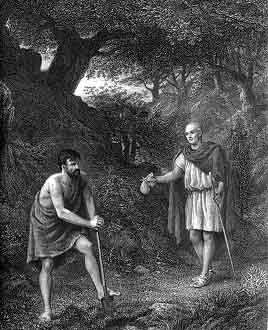
Timon and Apemantus (1873)

Apemantus (Ancient Greek: Ἀπήμαντος) is a character in the play Timon of Athens by William Shakespeare. He is a cynical and misanthropic philosopher. His name means "feeling no pain".

== Role in the play ==
Early in the play, when Timon is wealthy, Apemantus attends Timon's banquet in order to insult him and his guests. He is the only character at the time who treats Timon badly. The rest of the city highly respects him for his wealth and generosity. Apemantus has several witty exchanges with Timon, in which he argues that mankind is untrustworthy and that they are merely Timon's friends because of his money. Timon eventually loses all of his money and is abandoned by his friends. He turns his back on Athens to live in a cave, and takes the same opinions about mankind which Apemantus had. Apemantus visits him to accuse Timon of copying his ideals. The two of them then proceed to elaborately insult each other.

The best known recent Apemantus was portrayed by the Irish actor Norman Rodway, who played the role both for BBC television and for The Arkangel Shakespeare audiobook. His performance in these differ significantly, as neither the rest of the cast nor the interpretation is the same.
