= The History of Timon of Athens the Man-hater =

The History of Timon of Athens the Man-hater by Thomas Shadwell is a 1678 adaptation of Timon of Athens, the play by William Shakespeare.

== History ==
It was originally acted out at the Dukes Theatre, licensed by Roger L'Estrange, February 18, 1677/1678, and was printed in 1678 by J.M. for Henry Herringman. There is no record of a production of Shakespeare's original play until Shadwell's adaptation. Apart from re-writing the whole play in his own words, Shadwell adds some love interest with a mistress and a jealous fiancée for Timon.

For a revival in 1694 Henry Purcell wrote some incidental music for the play, consisting of an overture and a suite of dances, and a masque with songs and choruses: it serves as an adjunct and allegory of the main play. In Zimmerman's catalogue it appears as Purcell's Z 632. In Act 1, scene 2 of Shakespeare's play there is a masque of Amazons. Shadwell adapted this into a bucolic frivolity in Act 2, scene 1, in which Cupid and Bacchus, with a chorus of nymphs and satyrs, dispute whether love or wine is more important.

With memories of Thomas Betterton (actor-manager of the Duke's Company) in the title role and with Purcell's music, the play was revived several times up to 1745. Actors included John Mills, Barton Booth, Mary Porter, Lucretia Bradshaw, William Milward and James Quin.

== Synopsis ==
Timon of Athens opens up with Demetrius discovering a poet and painter come to sell their wares to a generous nobleman named Timon. Timon supports their cause, giving more than is necessary, which leads many characters to take advantage of him. Next, a messenger comes and informs Timon that a friend of his is imprisoned, and Timon quickly offers to pay his debt. Next, an old man comes and complains to Timon about a man who is seeing his daughter, but does not have enough money to offer a proper dowry. Timon once again shows his generosity by offering the man money to promote his estate.

Senators arrive for a feast that Timon is hosting, simultaneously a churlish man named Apemantus enters. Apemantus begins to rail against the excessive generosity of Timon, as well as the false intentions of the senators and nobles who shower Timon with false flattery. The senators continue to support Timon, while Apemantus says it like it is. After this spectacle, everyone leaves except for Timon and Evandra, his lover. She professes her love and he denies her.

In rage, Timon sets his house ablaze and then heads to the forest to live the life of a hermit. While digging for roots to eat, he finds large amount of gold. He is then visited by number of people from Athens. He is first visited by Alcibiades and two whores. He learns of Alcibiades' plan to wage war on Athens, and gives him some money to help fund his army. He also gives money to whores to encourage them to spread diseases around Athens. He is then visited by Evandra who questions him about his coldness to her. Next, he is visited by two lords who have heard about Timon's discovery of the gold. Timon gets angry and then sends them away. Eventually he dies.

== Characters ==
Because of the nature of the written version of this play (many of the names are abbreviated or cut off or misspelled) it is difficult to create a perfect list of the characters in the play. However, this list is close to accurate.

- Timon: Athenian who becomes a misanthrope and a cave-dwelling hermit after citizens take advantage of his generosity, then refuse to help him when he runs out of money.
- Aelius, Isidore, Phaeax: Lords who are false friends of Timon. Senators of Athens. (Note: Lucius is also the name of a servant in the play.)
- Ventidius: Another of Timon's false friends.
- Apemantus: Cynical philosopher who warns Timon that his friends are using him.
- Demetrius: Loyal steward of Timon. Warns Timon about his depleting money.
- Alcibiades: An Athenian general wronged by Athens. On-off relationship with Melissa.
- Thais, Phryne: Mistresses of Alcibiades.
- Old Athenians
- Diphilus, Flaminius, Lucilius, Servilius: Servants of Timon.
- Caphis, Philotus, Titus, Lucius, Hortensius: Servants of Timon's creditors.
- Poet, Painter, Jeweller, Merchant
- Page, Fool, Three Strangers
- Cupid and Amazons: Entertainers performing in a masque.
- Minor Characters: Other lords, senators, officers, soldiers, banditti (bandits), attendants.
- Evandra: Loyal lover of Timon
- Melissa: Shallow, materialist woman who leaves Timon.
- Nicias: Melissa's father
- Chloe: Melissa's friend
- Nymphs, Shepard, Aegipanes, Hout-Boys: Chorus
