= Michael Brennan (actor) =

English actor (1912–1982)

- in Ambush in Leopard Street (1962)
- Born: Bernard O'Leary; 25 September 1912; London, England
- Died: 29 June 1982 (aged 69); Chichester, Sussex, England
- Occupation: Actor
- Years active: 1939–1980
- Spouse: Mary Hignett

Michael Brennan (25 September 1912 – 29 June 1982) was an English film and television actor.

Born in London, Brennan was married to actress Mary Hignett. He appeared in such films as Tom Brown's Schooldays, Ivanhoe, Thunderball, Tom Jones, The Amorous Adventures of Moll Flanders and Doomwatch. On television, he made guest appearances on All Creatures Great and Small (which featured his wife) and Dixon of Dock Green.

== Partial filmography ==
- "Pimpernel" Smith (1941) – Camp Guard with Lantern (uncredited)
- They Made Me a Fugitive (1947) – Jim
- Captain Boycott (1947) – Jim O'Rourke (uncredited)
- Brighton Rock (1947) – Crabbe (uncredited)
- Blanche Fury (1948) – Farmer
- Escape (1948) – Truck Driver (uncredited)
- My Brother's Keeper (1948) – Police Constable at Roadblock (uncredited)
- Noose (1948) – Ropey (uncredited)
- Brass Monkey (1948) – Wilks
- Cardboard Cavalier (1949) – Brother Barebones
- For Them That Trespass (1949) – Det. Insp. Benstead
- The Chiltern Hundreds (1949) – Sergeant
- Morning Departure (1950) – C.P.O. Barlow
- They Were Not Divided (1950) – Smoke O'Connor
- Paul Temple's Triumph (1950) – (uncredited)
- Waterfront (1950) – Engineer
- Blackout (1950) – Mickey Garston
- No Trace (1950) – Mike Fenton
- The Clouded Yellow (1950) – Superintendent Ross
- Circle of Danger (1951) – Bert Oakshott
- The Lady with a Lamp (1951)
- Tom Brown's Schooldays (1951) – Black Bart
- Emergency Call (1952) – Police Constable
- Ivanhoe (1952) – Baldwin
- 13 East Street (1952) – George Mack
- Something Money Can't Buy (1952) – Fairground boss
- Made in Heaven (1952) – Sgt. Marne
- Personal Affair (1953) – Police Officer (uncredited)
- It's a Grand Life (1953) – Sgt. Maj. O'Reilly
- Trouble in Store (1953) – Davis
- Up to His Neck (1954) – CPO Brazier
- See How They Run (1955) – Sgt. Maj. Towers
- Up in the World (1956) – Prison Warder
- Not Wanted on Voyage (1957) – Chief Steward
- Just My Luck (1957) – Masseur
- The Naked Truth (1957) – 2nd Irishman (uncredited)
- A Tale of Two Cities (1958) – Tom – Coach Driver (uncredited)
- Law and Disorder (1958) – Bent – Warder Ext. Prison
- The Big Money (1958) – Bluey
- The 39 Steps (1959) – Detective on Train (uncredited)
- The Day They Robbed the Bank of England (1960) – Walters (uncredited)
- Watch Your Stern (1960) – Security guard
- Johnny Nobody (1961) – Supt. Lynch
- On the Fiddle (1961) – Soldier at Army Meat Van (uncredited)
- Ambush in Leopard Street (1962) – Harry
- The Devil's Agent (1962) – Horvat
- Live Now – Pay Later (1963) – Bailiff
- The Girl Hunters (1963) – Policeman
- Tom Jones (1963) – Jailer at Newgate (uncredited)
- The Amorous Adventures of Moll Flanders (1965) – The Turnkey
- Thunderball (1965) – Janni
- Death Is a Woman (1966) – Bonelli
- The Deadly Affair (1966) – Wolfe the Barman (uncredited)
- Three Hats for Lisa (1966) – Police Sergeant
- Just like a Woman (1967) – Commissionaire
- Woman Times Seven (1967) – (segment "At The Opera")
- Cuckoo Patrol (1967) – Superman No.1
- The Great Pony Raid (1968) – Butch
- Lust for a Vampire (1971) – Landlord
- Fright (1971) – Sergeant
- Doomwatch (1972) – Tom Straker
- Up the Front (1972) – M.P.
- Nothing But the Night (1972) – Deck Hand
