= The Quare Fellow (film) =

1962 British film

- Theatrical release poster
- Directed by: Arthur Dreifuss
- Written by: Arthur Dreifuss; Jacqueline Sundstrom
- Produced by: Anthony Havelock-Allan
- Starring: Patrick McGoohan; Sylvia Syms
- Cinematography: Peter Hennessy
- Production company: Anthony Havelock-Allan Productions
- Distributed by: BLC/Bryanston
- Release date: November 1962
- Running time: 85 mins
- Country: United Kingdom
- Language: English
- Budget: £147,322.

The Quare Fellow is a 1962 drama film that was adapted for the screen (from the play of the same name) and directed by Arthur Dreifuss. It starred Patrick McGoohan, Sylvia Syms and Walter Macken. Although the film received some favourable reviews, it is not regarded as a faithful adaptation of the play.

== Plot ==
Thomas Crimmin is a new warder at a Dublin prison where two men are condemned to die. One has his sentence commuted. Crimmin falls in love with Kathleen, the wife of the other prisoner, the "quare fellow".

Kathleen tells Crimmin her husband found her in bed with his brother, and that was why her husband killed him.

The quare fellow is hanged.

== Cast ==
- Patrick McGoohan as Thomas Crimmin
- Sylvia Syms as Kathleen
- Walter Macken as Regan
- Dermot Kelly as Donnelly
- Jack Cunningham as Chief Warden
- Hilton Edwards as Holy Healy
- Philip O'Flynn as Prison Governor
- Leo McCabe as Doctor Flyn
- Norman Rodway as Lavery
- Marie Kean as Mrs. O'Hara
- Pauline Delaney as Mickser's wife

== Production ==
Blondefilm and CBS were interested in the film rights. However, in the end, the rights were bought for £2,000 by Arthur Dreifuss. Dreifuss was under contract to Columbia Pictures at the time but could not interest them in making the movie. "The subject scares all hell out of the movie magnates", he said. "We really are making this film on faith, spit and belief."

Originally, Behan was asked to write the script. In the end, Dreifuss did it himself with additional dialogue by James McKenna, author of The Scattering. The script made substantial changes to Behan's original. "We have made explicit what was implicit in the play", said Dreifuss. "We have taken the enclosed world of the play and extended it to the people who are affected in the world outside the prison gates. We have continued the tangent' we have not drawn another line on the plot's graph."

Dreifuss says they tried to end the piece with an upbeat ending. "We're trying to bring the thing full circle", he said. Behan was unhappy with the changes.

Finance was obtained from Bryanston Films, Pathé Corporation in America and the Irish Film Finance Corporation. It was shot in Dublin, including location work at Kilmainham Gaol, with studio work done at Ardmore Studios. Filming started in November 1961.

== Release ==
The film had its world premiere at the Seventh Cork International Film Festival.

Britain submitted the film to the Venice Film Festival but they rejected it in favour of Term of Trial.

== Critical reception ==
The Monthly Film Bulletin wrote: "In the film the centre has been shifted from the prison and its inmates in general, to a "hero", the new young warder who begins by seeing everything as either black or white and (discovering that men can be gaoled for stealing firewood, and hanged for killing the seducers of their wives) comes to appreciate the existence of innumerable shades of grey. Patrick McGoohan gives a lightweight performance as this innocent, and Sylvia Syms is unconvincing as the Quare Fellow's promiscuous wife. The best performance comes from Walter Macken, compassionately cynical as the warder Regan, one of the few characters who still has a bit of Behan in him. Arthur Dreifuss' direction is quite effective on the unsubtle level dictated by his script."

Kine Weekly called it "challenging stuff, enacted by an all-but-flawless cast."

Variety called it "grim entertainment."

Filmink magazine argued, "Syms' character wasn't in the play but became the focus of the film, which caused her to get worse reviews than she deserved (from the few people who saw it). She's actually quite good in a less typical performance (lower class, trash bag) – although the film should've been closer to the play."
