= Timmons =

Timmons is a surname, and may refer to:

Persons

- Andy Timmons (born 1963), American rock guitarist
- Bob Timmons (1902–2004), American college basketball coach
- Bobby Timmons (1935–1974), American jazz pianist and composer
- Charlie Timmons (1917–1996), American football player
- Jay Timmons, American lobbyist
- Jeff Timmons (born 1973), American pop singer; founding member of the pop group 98 Degrees
- Joe Timmons, several people
- John Timmons (1890–1964), Scottish politician; MP for Bothwell 1945–1964
- John Morgan Timmons (1800–1863), Baptist minister; founder of Timmonsville, South Carolina
- Larry Timmons (1948–1997), Irish Roman Catholic missionary; murdered in Kenya
- Lawrence Timmons (born 1986), American football player
- Marcus Timmons (born 1971), American-born basketball player, playing for Adelaide, Australia
- Mark Timmons (contemporary), Irish Gaelic football player
- Ozzie Timmons (born 1970), American baseball player
- Patricia Timmons-Goodson (born 1954), American jurist on the Supreme Court of the State of North Carolina
- Richard Timmons (born 1956), American murderer
- Rick Timmons (born 1957), American painter
- Steve Timmons (born 1958), American Olympic volleyball player
- Stuart Timmons (1957–2017), American LGBT historian and activist
- Tim Timmons (born 1967), American baseball umpire
- Tim Timmons (born 1976), American Christian musician
- Tyrone Timmons (born 1984), American arena football player
- William Timmons (lobbyist), American politician, lobbyist and transition chief for the McCain campaign
- William Timmons, United States representative

Fictional characters

- Keith Timmons, character on the American soap opera Santa Barbara

== See also ==
- Timmins
- Timon (disambiguation)
