= The RSC Shakespeare =

2007 collected edition of the plays and poetry of William Shakespeare

The RSC Shakespeare is a 2007 collected edition of the plays and poetry of William Shakespeare. It contains 38 plays, two narrative poems, two shorter poems, the 154 Sonnets, and a transcription of a scene from Sir Thomas More, as well as a general introduction, annotations, and various appendices. Edited by Jonathan Bate and Eric Rasmussen, its primary source is Mr William Shakespeares Comedies, Histories, & Tragedies, more commonly known as the First Folio.

As its title suggests, the edition was prepared in conjunction with, and for use by, the Royal Shakespeare Company. In Bate's words, "[Folio editors] Hemings and Condell were trying to present the most theatrically-inflected versions of Shakespeare that they could find. It surely follows that a Folio-based complete works is the best starting-point for a theatrically-inflected Shakespeare today."

The RSC Shakespeare was first published in 2007 by Palgrave Macmillan in hardback, and in paperback the following year. Subsequently, the poetry and most of the plays were issued as individual titles. Bate and Rasmussen followed their edition with Collaborative Plays, ten works with material attributed in part to Shakespeare.
