= Rick Timmons =

American painter (1957–2022)

Rick Timmons (Oct 11, 1957-April 10, 2022), Dallas, Texas) was an American painter best known for equine art, large murals and portraits. After attending the Art Institute of Dallas, he joined the Dallas Fire Department in 1981 where he spent the next thirteen years. While doing more and more commissioned oil portrait paintings he was picked up by numerous southwest art galleries and in 1987/1988 was chosen to do commemorative paintings for both the New York and Texas Firefighter's Associations. In 1994 Timmons left the Dallas Fire Department and became a full-time painter. His works are mainly focused on firefighting, portraits, equine art, southwest art and bar murals.
