= Richard the Second =

2001 American film by John Farrell

Richard the Second is a 2001 American film adaptation of William Shakespeare's Richard II, directed by John Farrell.

== Production history ==
Farrell used Fort Strong, an abandoned post American Civil War-era fort on Long Island (an island in Boston Harbor), as the location for this production. The fort lacked electricity and Farrell's production used torchlight to illuminate the scenes that were set inside the structure.

Production took place between March and September 1987. However, the film went over its original $50,000 budget and Farrell was unable to secure financing to complete the production. As Farrell recalled in the book The Encyclopedia of Underground Movies: "The original intent with Richard the Second was to shoot in broadcast 1" format and transfer to 35mm. We shot with an Ikekami camera and used Sony reel-to-reel. I even did a test trailer in the edit suite which sent to a place in Los Angeles called Image Transform, which sent us back the trailer on 35 - this was when laser transfer was the new thing for video to film (no scan lines!)."

The film was given a direct-to-video release in 2001.
