= Timon of Athens (painting) =

1767 painting by Nathaniel Dance-Holland

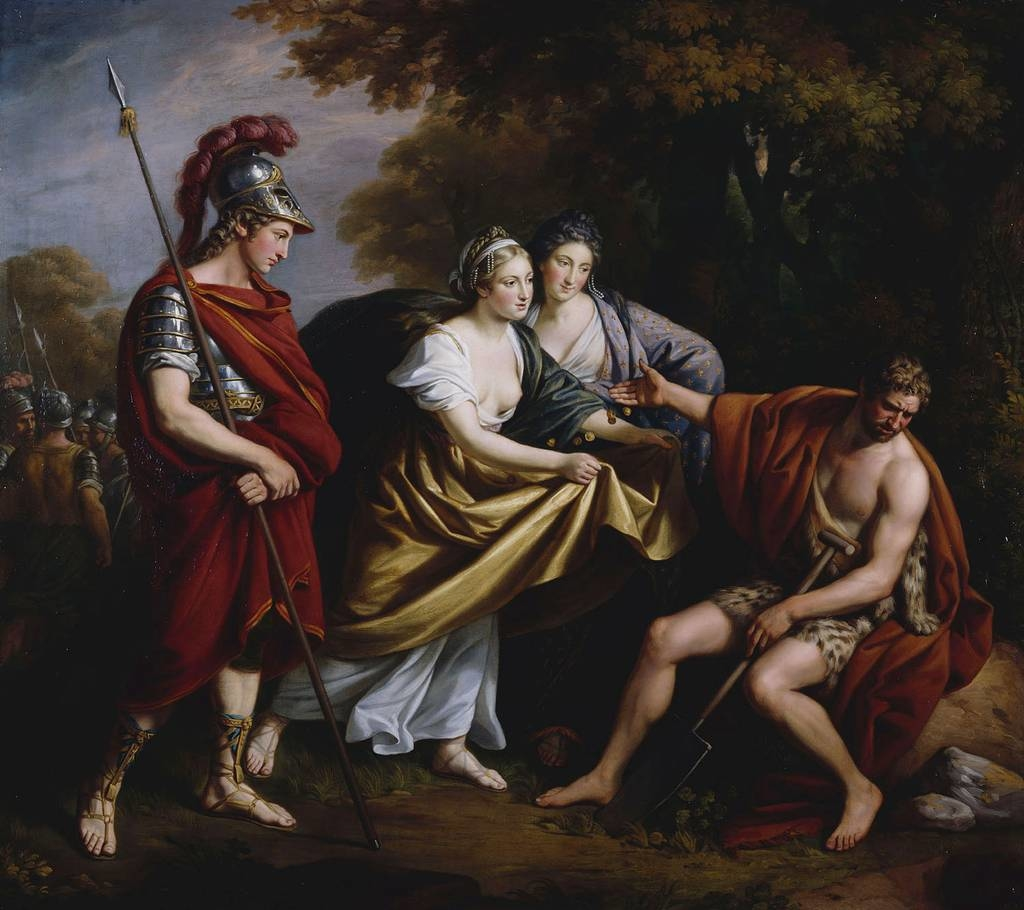
- Artist: Nathaniel Dance-Holland
- Year: c. 1767
- Type: Oil on canvas, history painting
- Dimensions: 122.2 cm × 137.5 cm (48.1 in × 54.1 in)
- Location: Royal Collection, London

Timon of Athens is an oil on canvas history painting by the British artist Nathaniel Dance-Holland, from c. 1767.

== History and description ==
Neoclassical in style, it depicts a scene from William Shakespeare's play Timon of Athens which was inspired by the historical figure Timon of Athens. It portrays a scene later in the play where Timon, having squandered his wealth on the unworthy Athenian people, is living in a self-imposed exile in a cave. He encounters the general Alcibiades in the company of two prostitutes, and tosses the gold he has recently dug up to them.

Dance-Holland spent the years from 1754 in Italy, before returning to Britain in the mid-1760s. The exact dating of the painting is uncertain. It was commissioned by George III (the commission was conveyed to Dance-Holland by Richard Dalton) and likely begun while the artist was still in Italy. In 1767 it was displayed at the annual exhibition of the Society of Artists of Great Britain, at Spring Gardens, in London, where the previous year he had exhibited another neoclassical painting, The Meeting of Dido and Aeneas. It was hung at Buckingham Palace in 1790, later being moved to Windsor Castle, and remains in the Royal Collection.

== Bibliography ==
- Barnden, Sally & McMullan, Gordon & Retford, Kate & Tambling, Kirsten (ed.). Shakespeare's Afterlife in the Royal Collection: Dynasty, Ideology, and National Culture. Oxford University Press, 2025.
- Lloyd, Christopher & Barron, Kathryn. The Quest for Albion: Monarchy and the Patronage of British Painting. Royal Collection Enterprises, 1998.
- Wright, Christopher, Gordon, Catherine May & Smith, Mary Peskett. British and Irish Paintings in Public Collections: An Index of British and Irish Oil Paintings by Artists Born Before 1870 in Public and Institutional Collections in the United Kingdom and Ireland. Yale University Press, 2006.
