= Norman Rodway =

Irish actor (1929–2001)

- Born: Norman John Frank Rodway; 7 February 1929; Dalkey, Dublin, Ireland
- Died: 13 March 2001 (aged 72); Banbury, Oxfordshire, England
- Occupation: Actor
- Spouse(s): Pauline Delaney (m. 1954; div. 19??); Mary Selway (m. 1966; div. 19??) Sarah Fitzgerald (m. 1973; div. 1974) Jane Rodway (m. 1991)
- Children: 1

Norman John Frank Rodway (7 February 1929 – 13 March 2001) was an Anglo-Irish actor.

== Early life ==
Rodway was born at the family home, Elsinore (named after the castle where Shakespeare's Hamlet is set), on Coliemore Road, Dalkey, Dublin, to Lillian Sybil (née Moyles) and Frank Rodway, who ran a shipping agency. His parents were English, and had moved to Dublin two years before he was born because his father had been posted there for work. He was educated at St Andrew's Church of Ireland National School and the High School, then studied at Trinity College Dublin, where he was elected a Scholar in classics in 1948. He worked as an accountant, teacher, and lecturer in Latin and Greek at Trinity before acting.

== Career ==
He made his stage debut in May 1953 at the Cork Opera House. There, he portrayed General Mannion in The Seventh Step. He made his first appearance in London's West End in 1959, as The Messenger in Cock-A-Doodle Dandy, and moved to England the following year. In 1962, he portrayed the young James Joyce in Stephen D, based on Joyce's writings. Rodway joined the Royal Shakespeare Company in 1966. His theatrical parts included Bassov in Summerfolk, and the title roles in Butley and Richard III.

Although he was primarily a stage actor, he also performed in radio, television and film productions. With his expressive voice (described by Jack Adrian as "rich and dark and thumpingly Celtic"), he made many radio broadcasts for the BBC. Major television roles included Cummings in Reilly, Ace of Spies, and Charles Brett in The Bretts. He also appeared in series such as Miss Marple, Rumpole of the Bailey and Inspector Morse. He acted with Orson Welles in Chimes at Midnight (1965) and I'll Never Forget What's'isname (1967), and with Patrick McGoohan in an episode of Danger Man, "The Man Who Wouldn't Talk". He often acted as the villain, including Adolf Hitler in The Empty Mirror (1999). He played the role of Apemantus in both television and audiobook productions of Shakespeare's Timon of Athens.

== Personal life ==
He was married four times. His first wife was actress Pauline Delaney, and his second was casting director Mary Selway. He was stepfather to Tara FitzGerald by his third marriage to Sarah Callaby (née Fitzgerald); Rodway and Callaby had a daughter, Bianca. He was married to Jane Rodway from 1991 to his death.

He was a noted enthusiast for crossword puzzles. Fellow actor Simon Russell Beale notes that Rodway turned him onto solving them during their run together at the Royal Shakespeare Company in Troilus and Cressida in 1990. It remained a running joke with them through his last illness.

== Filmography ==
=== Film ===
Year	Title	Role	Notes
1959	This Other Eden	Conor Heaphy	
1961	Johnny Nobody	Father Healey	
1961	Murder in Eden	Michael Lucas	
1961	A Question of Suspense	Frank Brigstock	
1962	The Webster Boy	Donald Saunders	
1962	Ambush in Leopard Street	Kegs	
1962	The Devil's Agent	Machine Gunner at border	Uncredited
1962	The Quare Fellow	Lavery	
1965	Four in the Morning	Husband	
1965	Chimes at Midnight	Henry 'Hotspur' Percy	
1967	The Penthouse	Dick	
1967	I'll Never Forget What's'isname	Nicholas	
1975	The Hiding Place	Van Der Veen	
1976	The Story of David	Joab	TV movie
1981	Dragonslayer	Greil	Dub only
1981	John Bunyan	The Preacher	
1982	Who Dares Wins	Ryan	
1985	Coming Through	William Hopkin	TV film
1986	Tai-Pan	Aristotle Quance	
1990	King of the Wind	Capt. 'Blueskin' Blake	
1996	Mother Night	Werner Noth	
1996	The Empty Mirror	Adolf Hitler	
2000	County Kilburn	Mr. Bollox	
2001	A. Hitler	Hitler	(final film role)

=== Television ===
Year	Title	Role	Notes
1963	Sergeant Cork	John D'Arcy	Episode: "The Case of the Fenian Men"
1964	The Massingham Affair	Mr. Gilmore	4 episodes
1965	The Sullavan Brothers	Father Blaise	1 episode
1973	The Protectors	Colin Grant	Episode: "For the Rest of Your Natural..."
1976	Thriller	Peter Ingram	Episode: "A Midsummer Nightmare"
1976	The Sweeney	Philip Edmunds	Episode: "Lady Luck"
1978	Out	Det. Insp. Bryce	5 episodes
1981	BBC Television Shakespeare	Apemantus	Episode: "Timon of Athens"
1983	Reilly: Ace of Spies	Cummings	10 episodes
1984	Cockles	Jacques du Bois	6 episodes
1987–1989	The Bretts	Charles	19 episodes
1988	Rumpole of the Bailey	Morry Machin	Episode: "Rumpole and the Bubble Reputation"
1989	Inspector Morse	Roland Marshall	Episode: "Deceived by Flight"
1993	Jeeves and Wooster	Major Plank	Episode: "Totleigh Towers (or, Trouble at Totleigh Towers)"
1998	As Time Goes By	James	Episode: "An Old Flame"

== Sources ==
- Contemporary Theatre, Film, and Television (vol. 26), 2000
- Who’s Who in Theatre, 1981
