= Joe Timmons =

Joe Timmons may refer to:

- Joe Timmons (referee), Scottish football referee
- Joe Timmons (Gaelic footballer), Irish Gaelic footballer
- Joe Timmons (politician), American politician from Washington state
