= Dominique Le Gendre =

- Born: 16 September 1960 (age 66)
- Origin: Trinidad and Tobago
- Occupations: Musician, composer
- Website: dominiquelegendre.com

Dominique Le Gendre (born 16 September 1960 in Trinidad and Tobago) is a music composer based in London, England. Le Gendre is a former associate of the Royal Opera House and received an opera commission. She has also provided music for the Shakespeare Globe Theatre, Talawa Theatre Company, and the Theatre of Black Women, among other places. She provided the music for an opera with words by Seamus Heaney.

== Early life and career ==
Le Gendre was born and brought up in Trinidad and Tobago and her involvement in music began from an early age, playing the guitar for her local church choir from age 10. Le Gendre's Bird of Night was her first full-length opera which premiered at Linbury Studio Theatre, London. She has composed music for theatre, dance, art installations, film, television and radio drama for BBC Radio 3 and Radio 4. She has composed and produced music for all 38 Shakespeare plays recorded for the audio CD collection, The Complete Arkangel Shakespeare, directed by Clive Brill. In 2018 Le Gendre composed and directed music for the critically acclaimed Production of Richard II at Shakespeare's Globe. She has composed music for many films like Dreams in Transit, Sixth Happiness, The Body of a Poet, I Is a long Memoried Woman, The Healer, Runaway Bay, and others.
