= Timon of Athens (person) =

5th-century BC Athenian citizen

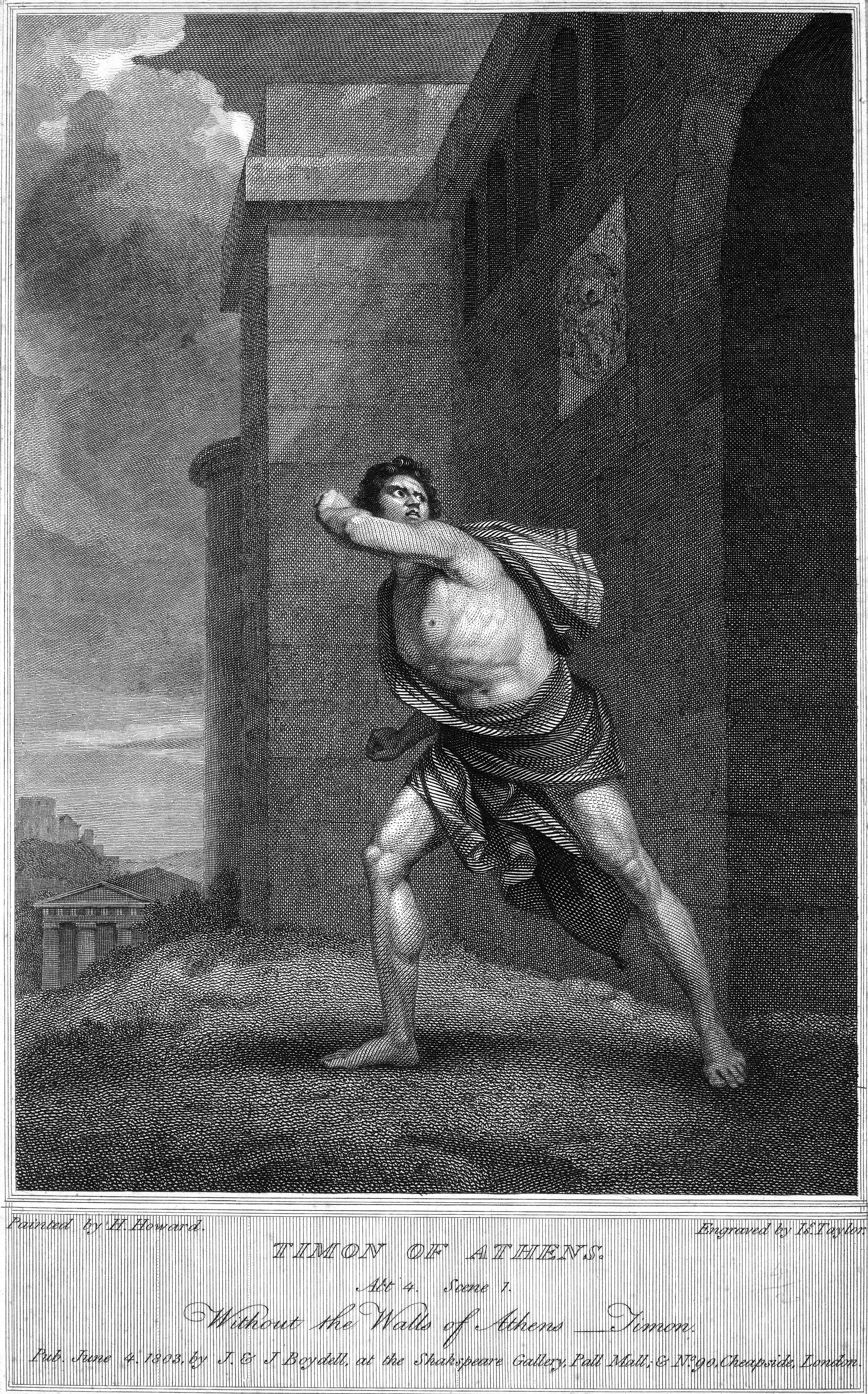
- Timon renounces society (1803 engraving for Shakespeare, Timon of Athens, Act IV, Scene 1)
- Born: c. 5th Century BC
- Died: Unknown

Timon of Athens (/ˈtaɪmən/ TY-mən; Ancient Greek: Τίμων ὁ Ἀθηναῖος, romanized: Tímōn ho Athēnaîos, gen. Τίμωνος, Tímōnos) was a citizen of Athens whose reputation for misanthropy grew to legendary status. According to the historian Plutarch, Timon lived during the era of the Peloponnesian War (431–404 BC).

== Overview ==
According to Lucian, Timon was the wealthy son of Echecratides who lavished his money on flattering friends. When his funds ran out, the friends deserted him and Timon was reduced to working in the fields. One day, he found a pot of gold and soon his fair-weather friends were back. This time, he drove them away with dirt clods.

Both Aristophanes and Plato Comicus mention Timon as an angry despiser of mankind, who held Alcibiades in high regard because he correctly believed Alcibiades would someday harm Athens. Another source is Parallel Lives by Plutarch in which Plutarch mentioned briefly Timon as the one who represented in Greek writer's works. He says: "Timon was an Athenian, and lived about the time of the Peloponnesian War, as may be gathered from the plays of Aristophanes and Plato. For he is represented in their comedies as peevish and misanthropical; but though he avoided and repelled all intercourse with men . . ."

== Cultural references ==
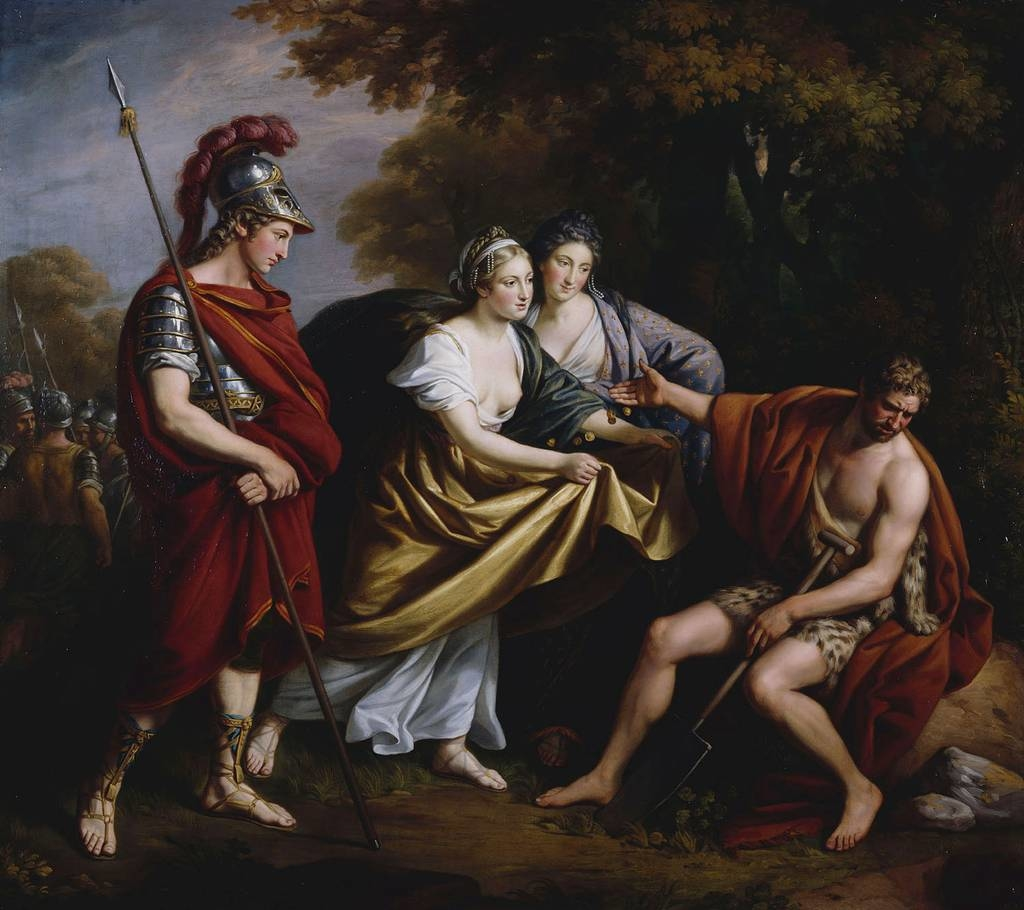
Timon of Athens by Nathaniel Dance-Holland, 1767

- In Lysistrata (vv.809-820), the chorus of old women claim that although Timon hated men, he was friendly and courteous towards women.
- Cicero, in his treatise on friendship De Amicitia, refers to Timon of Athens when discussing how friendship creeps into the lives of everyone, even those who fiercely shun society.
- According to Strabo (Geography XVII.9), after his defeat at Actium (2 September 31 BC), Mark Antony built a retreat at the end of a mole of land projecting into the harbor of Alexandria which he named the Timonium, after Timon of Athens, as Antony considered himself to be, like Timon, forsaken by his friends, and desired to live the rest of his days in solitude.
- The dialogue Timon or The Misanthrope by Lucian is about Timon.
- Timon is the inspiration for the William Shakespeare play Timon of Athens.
- Timon is the eponym of the words Timonist, Timonism, Timonian, and Timonize.
- The artist Nathaniel Dance-Holland produced a painting Timon of Athens for George III
- Jonathan Swift claims to maintain a different sort of misanthropy than Timon in a letter to Alexander Pope.
- William Saxey (died 1612), a judge noted for misanthropy, was called "Timon that endureth no man".
- In Chapter III of The Confidence-Man, Herman Melville uses an unnamed bystander to underscore the madness of an uncharitable reprobate as an example that "might deter Timon."
- In Charlotte Brontë's novel Villette, the protagonist Lucy Snowe is called Timon by her friend Ginevra Fanshawe because of her cynical demeanor.
