= Plato (comic poet) =

5th/4th century BC Athenian Old Comedy poet

Plato (also Plato Comicus; Ancient Greek: Πλάτων Κωμικός) was an Athenian comic poet and contemporary of Aristophanes. None of his plays survive intact, but the titles of thirty of them are known, including a Hyperbolus (c. 420–416 BC), Victories (after 421), Cleophon (in 405), and Phaon (probably in 391). The titles suggest that his themes were often political. In 410 BC, one of his plays took first prize at the City Dionysia.

Phaon included a scene (quoted in the Deipnosophistae of Athenaeus) in which a character sits down to study a poem about gastronomy (in fact mostly about aphrodisiacs) and reads some of it aloud: "In ashes first your onions roast, Till they are brown as toast, Then with sauce and gravy cover; Eat them, you'll be strong all over." The poem is in hexameters, and therefore sounds like a lampoon of the work of Archestratus, although the speaker calls it "a book by Philoxenus", meaning either the poet Philoxenus of Cythera, the glutton Philoxenus of Leucas, or both indiscriminately.

== Surviving titles and fragments ==
Of Plato's plays only the following thirty titles have come down to us, along with 292 associated fragments.

- Adonis
- The Alliance
- Ambassadors
- Amphiareos
- Ants
- Cleophon
- Daidalus
- Europe
- Festivals
- Greece, or the Islands
- Griffins
- Hyperbolus
- Io
- Laius
- Laconians, or Poets
- Little Child
- The Long Night
- Meneleos
- Peisander
- Perialges
- Phaon
- Pieces of Furniture
- The Poet
- The Resident Aliens
- The Sophists
- Syrphex
- Victories
- The Women from the Temples
- Xantriai, or Kerkopes
- Zeus Being Wronged
