= Timon of Athens =

Play by Shakespeare

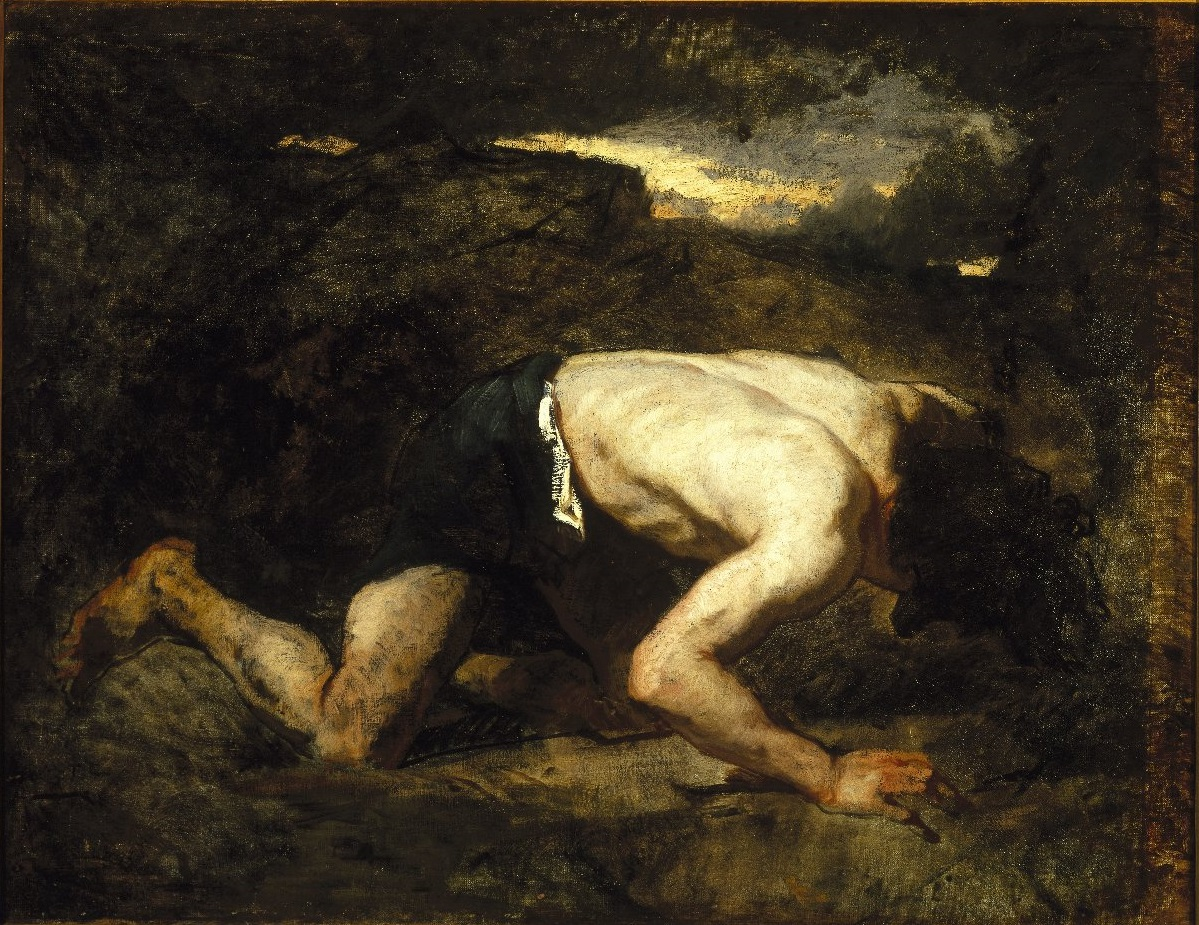
The Fugitive, Study for Timon of Athens, Thomas Couture (c. 1857)

The Life of Tymon of Athens, often shortened to Timon of Athens, is a play written by William Shakespeare and likely also Thomas Middleton in about 1606. It was published in the First Folio in 1623. Timon lavishes his wealth on parasitic companions until he is poor and rejected by them. He then denounces all of mankind, and isolates himself in a cave in the wilderness.

The earliest-known production of the play was in 1674, when Thomas Shadwell wrote an adaptation under the title The History of Timon of Athens, The Man-hater. Multiple other adaptations followed over the next century, by writers such as Thomas Hull, James Love and Richard Cumberland. The straight Shakespearean text was performed at Smock Alley in Dublin in 1761, but adaptations continued to dominate the stage until well into the 20th century.

Timon of Athens was originally grouped with the tragedies, but recently some scholars have started regarding it as one of the problem plays.

== Characters ==
- Timon – a lord, and later a misanthrope, of Athens
- Alcibiades – captain of a military brigade and good friend of Timon
- Apemantus – sometimes spelled Apermantus, a philosopher and churl. His name means "feeling no pain"
- Flavius – Timon's chief Steward
- Flaminius – Timon's servant
- Servilius – Timon's servant
- Lucilius – a romantic youth and Timon's servant
- Ventidius – also spelled "Ventidgius", one of Timon's "friends" initially in debtors' prison
- Lucullus – Timon's "friend"
- Lucius – Timon's "friend"
- Sempronius – Timon's "friend"
- Poet and Painter – two friends and artists who seek Timon's patronage
- Jeweller
- Merchant
- Senators of Athens
- Fool – briefly a companion to Apemantus
- Three Strangers, one named Hostilius – friends of Lucius
- The Old Athenian – the father of the woman Lucilius loves
- Four Lords – false friends of Timon
- Servants to Timon, Isidore, Lucullus, Lucius and Varro
- Titus, Hortensius and Philotus – Timon's creditors (Isidore and Varro are also creditors, but only their servants appear)
- Phrynia – a prostitute
- Timandra – a prostitute
- Banditti
- Soldier
- Page
- Cupid – introduces the masque
- Ladies at the Masque

== Synopsis ==
Timon is a wealthy and generous Athenian gentleman. He hosts a large banquet, attended by nearly all of Athens. Timon gives away money wastefully, and everyone around him pleases him to receive more, except for Apemantus, a churlish philosopher (whose name means "feeling no pain") whose cynicism Timon cannot yet appreciate. He accepts art from a poet and a painter, and a jewel from a jeweler, only to later give his jewel away to another friend. Timon's servant, Lucilius, has been wooing the daughter of an old Athenian. The Athenian is furious with Lucilius's flirting, but Timon pays him three talents to fund the couple's marriage, because the happiness of his servant is worth the price. Timon is told that his friend, Ventidius, is in debtors' prison. He sends money to pay for Ventidius's debt, and Ventidius is released and attends Timon's banquet. Timon gives a speech on the value of friendship, and later, the guests are entertained by a masque, followed by dancing. As the party winds down, Timon continues to wastefully give away to his friends: his horses, as well as other possessions. The act is divided rather arbitrarily into two scenes, but the experimental or unfinished nature of the play is reflected in that it does not naturally break into a five-act structure.

Unbeknownst to him, Timon has given away all his wealth, and is deep in debt. Flavius, Timon's steward, is upset by the way Timon is spending his wealth; overextending his munificence by showering patronage over parasitic writers and artists, and saving his dubious friends from their financial straits; Flavius confronts Timon when he returns from a hunt. Timon is upset that Flavius did not warn him of his debt before, and begins to direct his anger onto Flavius, who says that he has tried repeatedly in the past without success, and now he is at the end: all of Timon's land has been sold. Shadowing Timon is another guest at the banquet: Apemantus, who terrorises Timon's shallow companions with his caustic raillery. Along with a Fool, he attacks Timon's creditors when they show up to make their demands for immediate payment. Timon has no money to repay his debt, thus he sends out his servants to request money from those friends he considers closest.

Timon's servants are turned down, one by one, by Timon's false friends. Elsewhere, one of Alcibiades's junior officers, in a rage, kills a man in "hot blood". Alcibiades pleads with the Senate for mercy, arguing that a crime of passion should not carry as severe a sentence as premeditated murder. The senators disagree, and, when Alcibiades persists, banish him forever. Alcibiades vows revenge, with the support of his troops. The act finishes with Timon discussing with his servants the revenge he will carry out at his next banquet.

Timon hosts a smaller party, intended only for those he feels have betrayed him. The serving trays are set before the diners, but contain only rocks and lukewarm water. Timon ambushes his false friends and flees Athens. The loyal Flavius vows to find him.

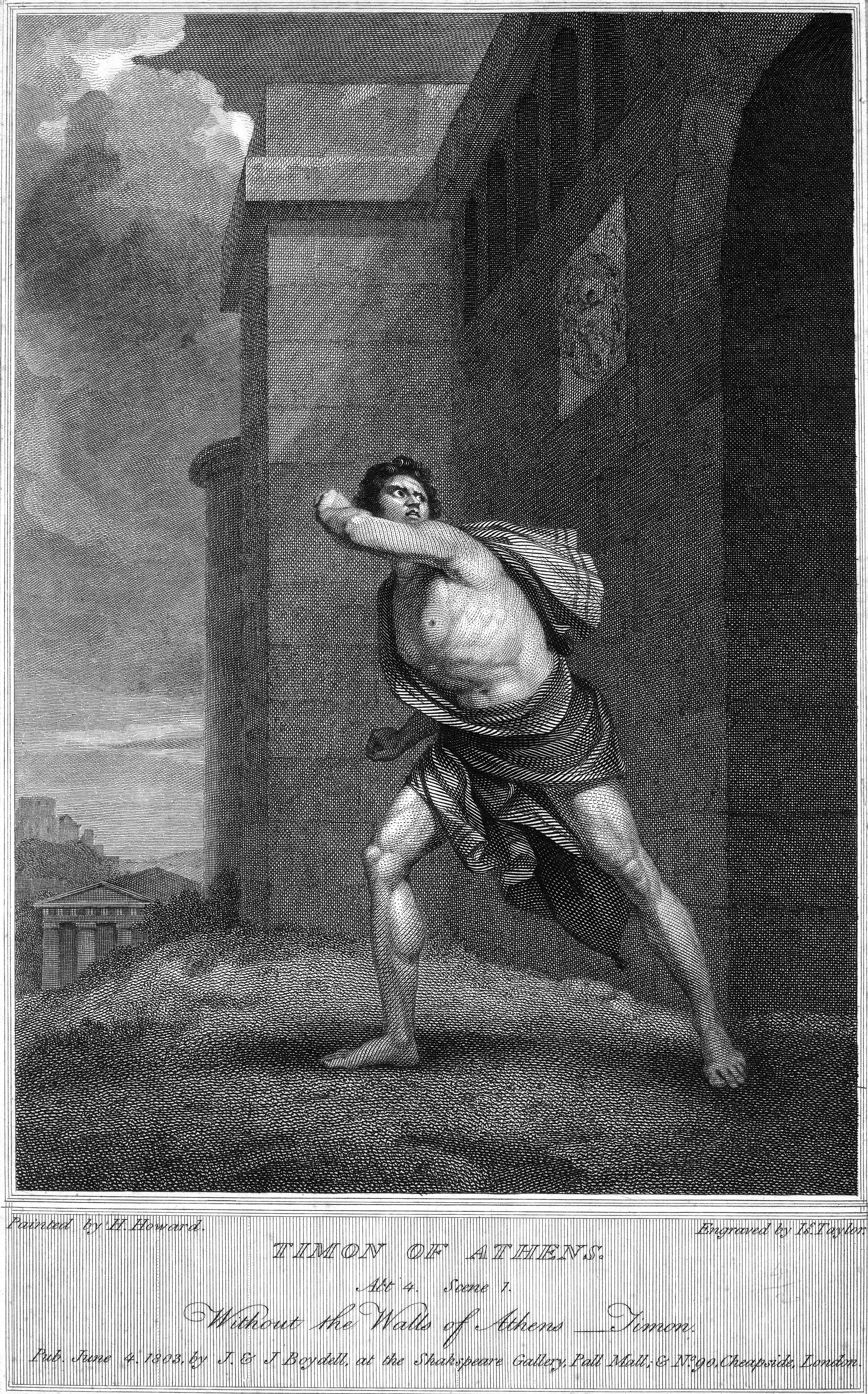
Timon renounces society (1803 engraving for Shakespeare, Timon of Athens, act IV, scene 1)

Cursing the city walls, Timon goes into the wilderness and makes his crude home in a cave, sustaining himself on roots. Here he discovers an underground trove of gold. The knowledge of his discovery spreads. Alcibiades, Apemantus, and three bandits are able to find Timon before Flavius does. Accompanying Alcibiades are two prostitutes, Phrynia and Timandra, who trade barbs with the bitter Timon on the subject of venereal disease. Timon offers most of the gold to the rebel Alcibiades to subsidise his assault on the city, which Timon now wants to see destroyed, as his experiences have reduced him to misanthropy. He gives the rest to his whores, to spread disease, and much of the remainder to the poet and the painter, who arrive soon after, leaving little for the senators who visit him. Apemantus appears and accuses Timon of copying his pessimistic ways, and there is a mutually misanthropic exchange of invective.

Flavius arrives. Flavius asks Timon for money as well, but also asks for Timon to return to society. Timon acknowledges that he has had one true friend in Flavius, a shining example of an otherwise diseased and impure race, but laments that Flavius is a mere servant. He invites the last set of envoys from Athens, who hoped Timon might placate Alcibiades, to go hang themselves, and then dies in the wilderness. Alcibiades, marching on Athens, throws down his glove, and ends the play reading the bitter epitaph Timon wrote for himself, part of which was composed by Callimachus:

Here lies a wretched corpse of wretched soul bereft:
Seek not my name: a plague consume you wicked caitiffs left!
Here lie I, Timon, who alive, all living men did hate,
Pass by, and curse thy fill, but pass and stay not here thy gait.

== Date and text ==
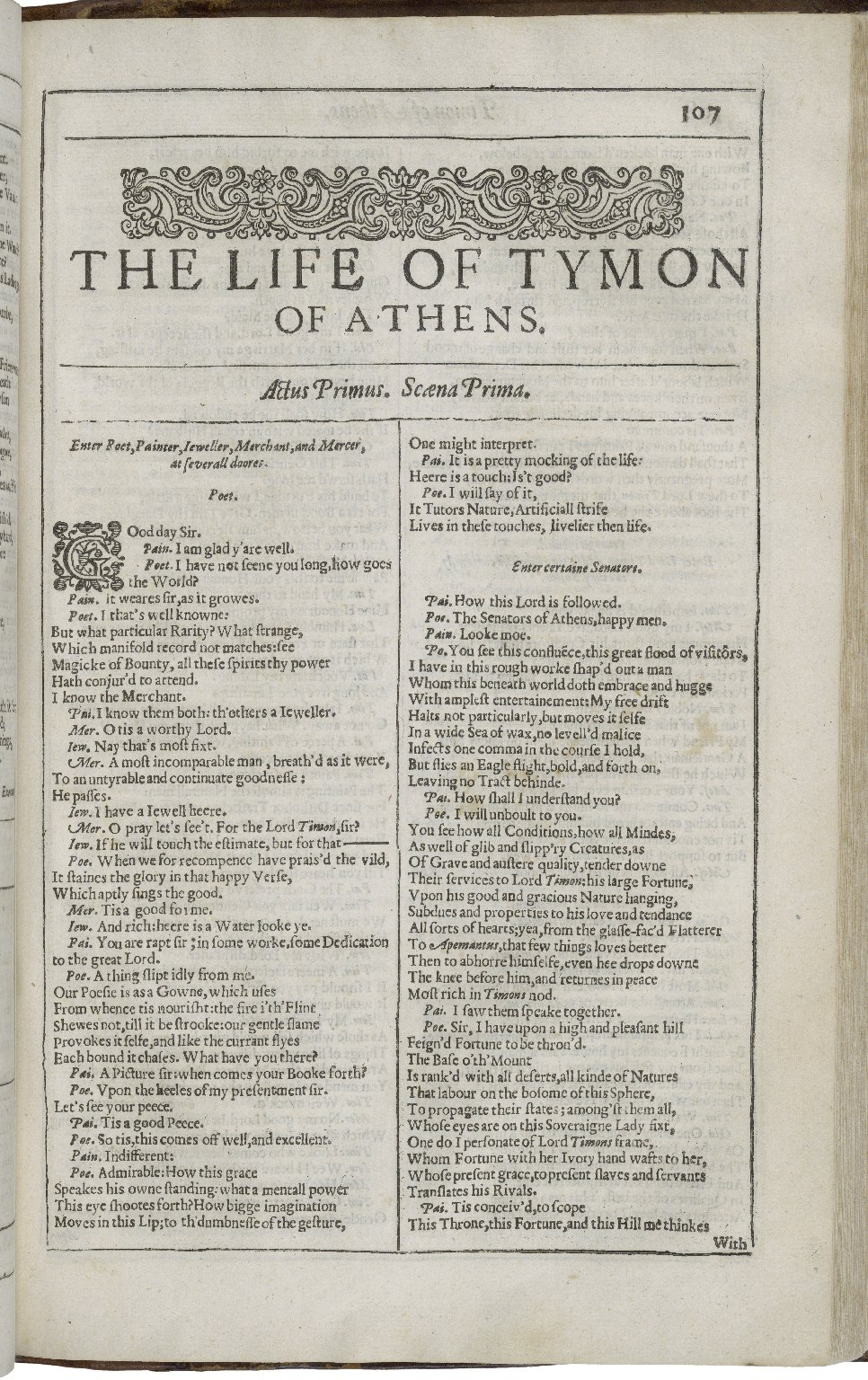
First page of Timon of Athens, printed in the Second Folio of 1632

The play's date is uncertain, though its bitter tone links it with Coriolanus and King Lear. John Day's play Humour Out of Breath, published in 1608, contains a reference to "the lord that gave all to his followers, and begged more for himself" – a possible allusion to Timon that would, if valid, support a date of composition before 1608. It has been proposed that Shakespeare himself took the role of the Poet, who has the fifth-largest line count in the play.

The play was entered into the Stationers' Register in 1623. There are no contemporary allusions to the play by which its date of composition may be determined, (Note: There was, however, a "cluster of brief references" to the subject of Timon the misanthrope in the years 1600–06.) nor is there an agreed means of explaining the play's "loose ends and inconsistencies". Editors since the twentieth century have sought to remedy these defects through conjectures about Shakespeare's emotional development (Chambers); hypotheses concerning the play's "unfinished state" (Ellis-Fermor) and "scribal interference" (Oliver); and through statistical analyses of vocabulary, stage directions, and so forth.

Assuming the play is a collaboration between Shakespeare and Middleton, its date has been placed in the period 1605–1608, most likely 1606. In his 2004 edition for the Oxford Shakespeare, John Jowett argues the lack of act divisions in the Folio text is an important factor in determining a date. The King's Men only began to use act divisions in their scripts when they occupied the indoor Blackfriars Theatre in August 1608 as their winter playhouse. Timon is notoriously difficult to divide into acts, suggesting to Jowett that it was written at a time when act divisions were of no concern to the writer, hence it must have been written prior to August 1608. A terminus post quem may come from a possible topical allusion to the Gunpowder Plot of November 1605; "those that under hot ardent zeal would set whole realms on fire" (scene 7, 32–33). In the context of the play, the line is referring to religious zeal, but some scholars feel it is a subtle reference to the events of November. The play may also have been influenced by a pamphlet published in June 1605, Two Unnatural and Bloody Murders, which served as the primary source for Thomas Middleton's A Yorkshire Tragedy. This would narrow the possible range of dates to sometime between November 1605 and August 1608. Furthermore, MacDonald P. Jackson's rare-word test found the conjectured Shakespearean parts of the text date to 1605–1606. Going further, Jackson found that if one examines the non-Shakespearean sections in the context of Middleton's career, a date of 1605–1606 also results.

== Sources ==
Shakespeare, in writing the play, probably drew upon the 28th novella of William Painter's Palace of Pleasure, the 38th novella of which was the main source for his All's Well That Ends Well. He also drew upon Plutarch's Lives, and perhaps Lucian's Dialogues (Note: Probably in Erasmus's Latin translation of 1528.) and a lost comedy on the subject of Timon, allusions to which survive from 1584. The historical figure of Timon of Athens was already mentioned in Aristophanes's Lysistrata; by Plato Comicus; in Cicero's De Amicitia; in Strabo's Geographica; in Lucian's Timon the Misanthrope; and in Plutarch's Parallel Lives (namely the Antony and the Alcibiades).

== Authorship ==
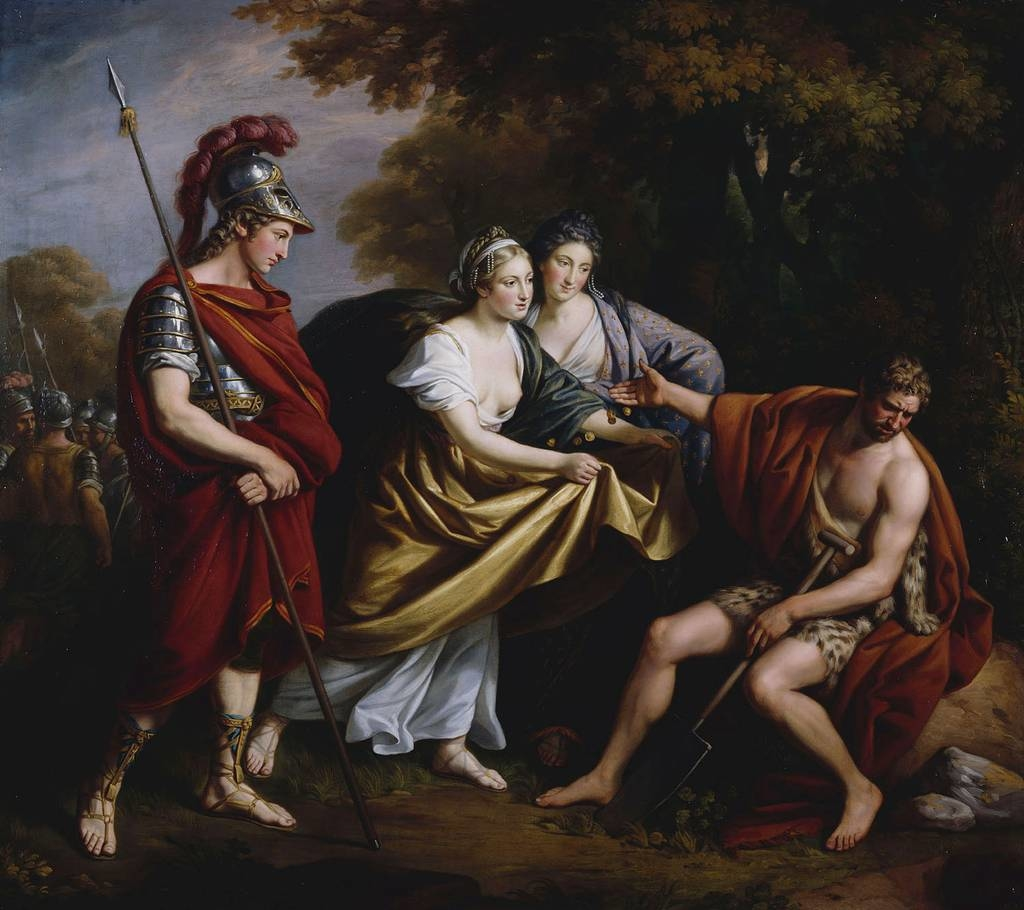
Timon of Athens by Nathaniel Dance-Holland, c. 1767

Since the 19th century, suggestions have been made that Timon is the work of two writers, and it has been argued that the play's unusual features are the result of its co-authorship by playwrights with very different mentalities; the most popular candidate, Thomas Middleton, was first suggested in 1920.

The play contains several narrative inconsistencies uncharacteristic of Shakespeare, an unusually unsatisfying dénouement, drastically different styles in different places, and unusually many long lines that do not scan. One theory is that the play as it appears in the First Folio is unfinished. E. K. Chambers believes Shakespeare began the play, but abandoned it due to a mental breakdown and never finished it. F. W. Brownlow believes the play was Shakespeare's last and remained uncompleted at his death. The now-predominant theory of collaborative authorship was proposed by Charles Knight in 1838. Today, many scholars believe that other dramatist was Middleton, but the exact nature of the collaboration is disputed. Did Middleton revise a piece begun by Shakespeare, did Shakespeare revise Middleton's work, or did they work together? John Jowett, editor of the play for both the Oxford Shakespeare: Complete Works and the individual Oxford Shakespeare edition, believes Middleton worked with Shakespeare in an understudy capacity and wrote scenes 2 (1.2 in editions which divide the play into acts), 5 (3.1), 6 (3.2), 7 (3.3), 8 (3.4), 9 (3.5), 10 (3.6) and the last eighty lines of 14 (4.3).

A 1917 study by J. M. Robertson posits that George Chapman wrote "A Lover's Complaint" and was the originator of Timon of Athens. These claims were rejected by other commentators, including Bertolt Brecht, Frank Harris, and Rolf Soellner (1979), who thought the play was a theatrical experiment. They argued that if one playwright revised another's play it would have been "fixed" to the standards of Jacobean theatre, which is clearly not the case. Soellner believed the play is unusual because it was written to be performed at the Inns of Court, where it would have found a niche audience with young lawyers.

Linguistic analyses of the text have all discovered apparent confirmation of the theory that Middleton wrote much of it. It contains numerous words, phrases, and punctuation choices characteristic of his work but rare in Shakespeare. These linguistic markers cluster in certain scenes, apparently indicating that the play is a collaboration between Middleton and Shakespeare, not a revision of one's work by the other. The evidence suggests that Middleton wrote about a third of the play, mostly the central scenes. The editor of the Oxford edition, John Jowett, writes that Middleton

wrote the banquet scene (Sc. 2), the central scenes with Timon's creditors and Alcibiades' confrontation with the senate, and most of the episodes figuring the Steward. The play's abrasively harsh humour and its depiction of social relationships that involve a denial of personal relationships are Middletonian traits[.]

Jowett stresses that Middleton's presence does not mean the play should be disregarded, calling Timon of Athens "all the more interesting because the text articulates a dialogue between two dramatists of a very different temper."

== Analysis and criticism ==
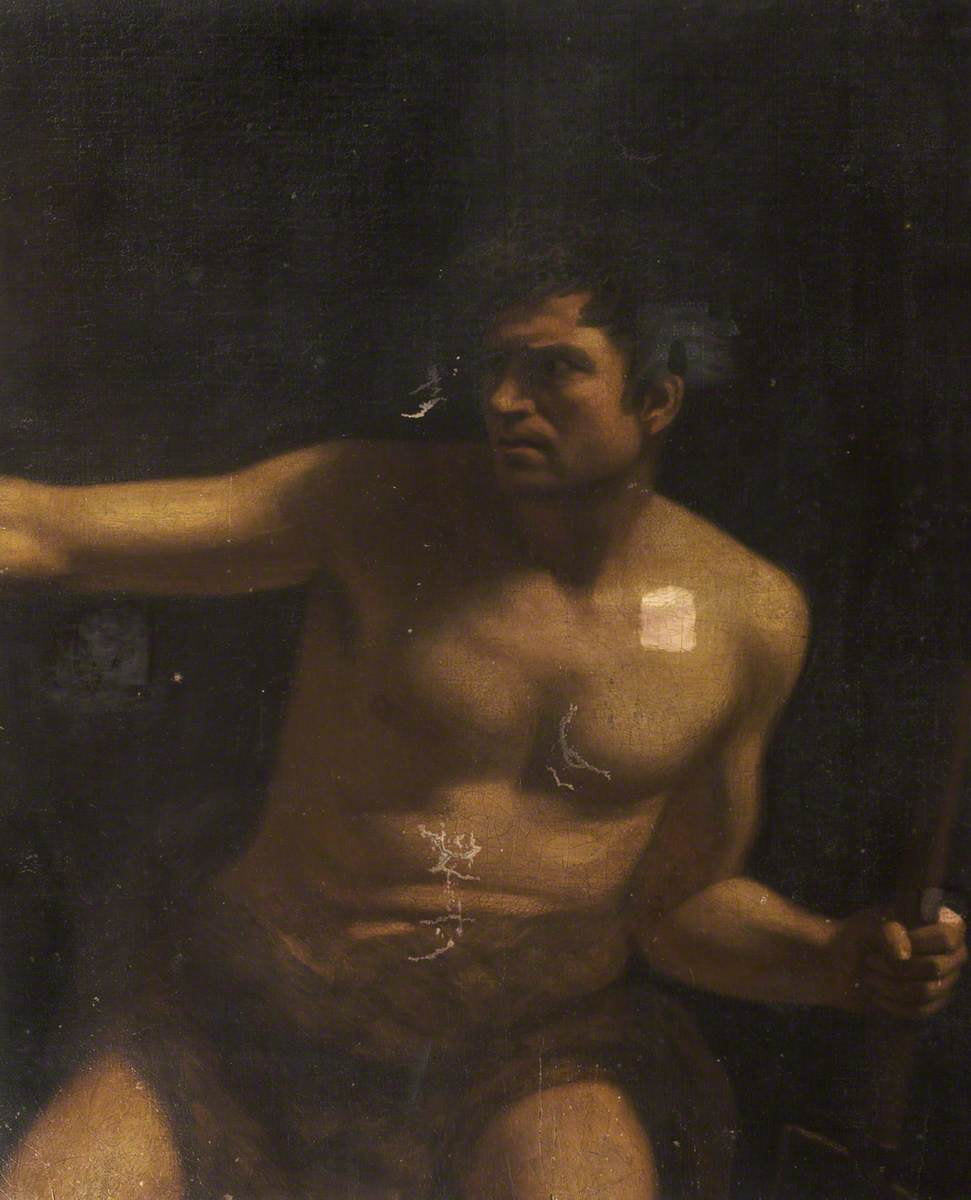
Timon (fragment of 'Timon of Athens'), John Opie (c. 1790)

Many scholars find much unfinished about this play including unexplained plot developments, characters who appear unexplained and say little, prose sections that a polished version would have in verse (although close analysis would show this to be almost exclusively in the lines of Apemantus, and probably an intentional character trait), and the two epitaphs, one of which doubtless would have been cancelled in the final version. However, similar duplications appear in Julius Caesar and Love's Labour's Lost and are generally thought to be examples of two versions being printed when only one was ultimately used in production, which could easily be the case here. Frank Kermode refers to the play as "a poor relation of the major tragedies." This is the majority view, but the play has many scholarly defenders as well. Nevertheless, and perhaps unsurprisingly due to its subject matter, it has not proven to be among Shakespeare's popular works.

An anonymous play, Timon, also survives. In this adaptation, Timon is explicitly hedonistic and spends his money much more on himself than in Shakespeare's version, and has a mistress, unlike the character in Shakespeare's version. This play mentions a London inn called The Seven Stars that did not exist before 1602, and it contains elements that are in Shakespeare's play but not in Plutarch or in Lucian's dialogue, Timon the Misanthrope, the other major accepted source for Shakespeare's play. Both Jacobean plays deal extensively with Timon's life before his flight into the wilderness, which in both Greek versions is given little more than one sentence each.

Soellner (1979) argues that Shakespeare's play is equal parts tragedy and satire, but that neither term can adequately be used as an adjective, for it is first and foremost a tragedy, and it does not satirise tragedy; rather, it satirises its subjects in the manner of Juvenalian satire while simultaneously being a tragedy.

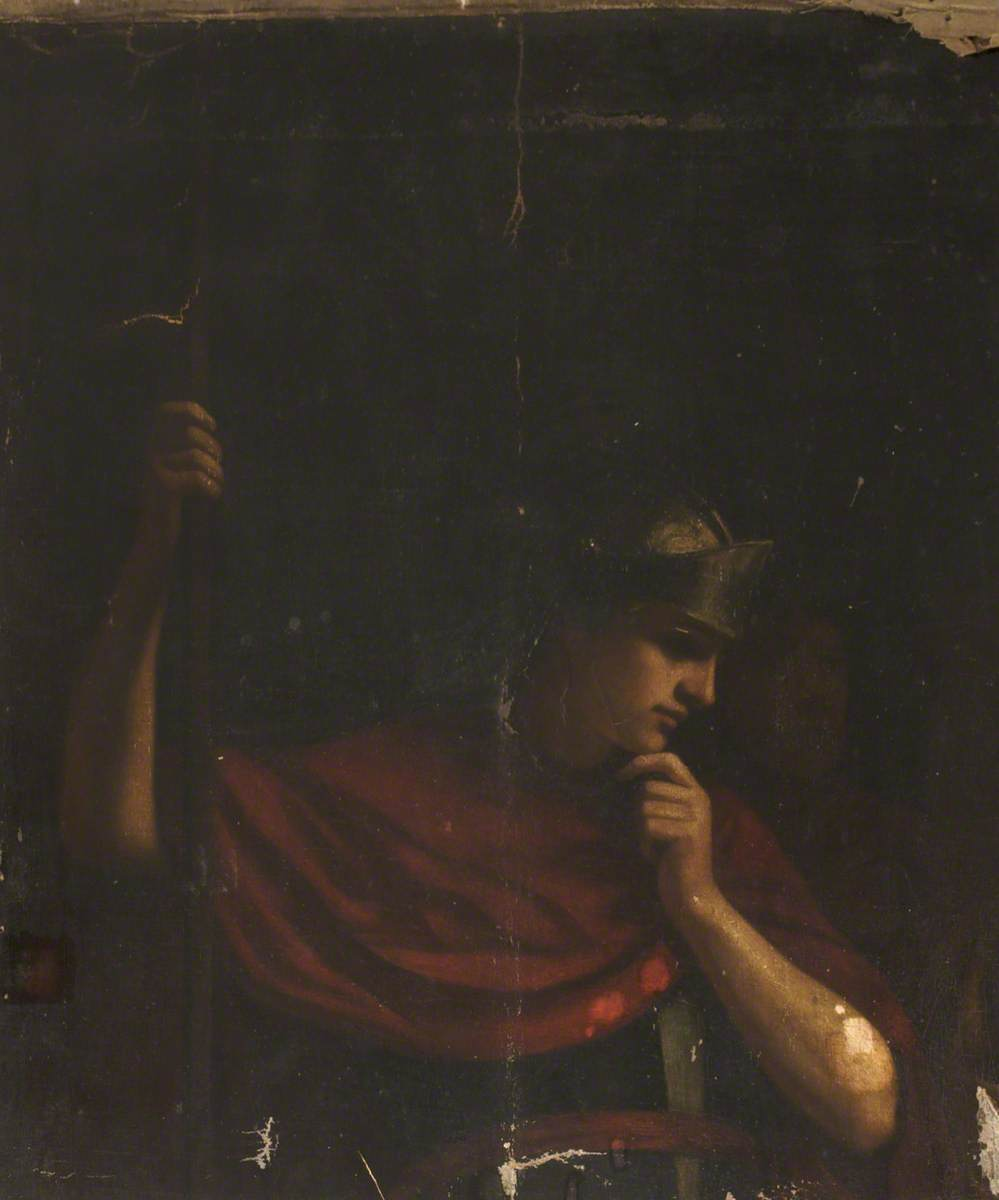
Alcibiades (fragment of 'Timon of Athens'), John Opie (c. 1790)

Herman Melville considered Timon to be among the most profound of Shakespeare's plays, and in his 1850 review "Hawthorne and His Mosses" writes that Shakespeare is not "a mere man of Richard-the-Third humps, and Macbeth daggers," but rather "it is those deep far-away things in him; those occasional flashings-forth of the intuitive Truth in him; those short, quick probings at the very axis of reality: these are the things that make Shakespeare, Shakespeare. Through the mouths of the dark characters of Hamlet, Timon, Lear, and Iago, he craftily says, or sometimes insinuates the things, which we feel to be so terrifically true, that it were all but madness for any good man, in his own proper character, to utter, or even hint of them." In his 1590 Greene's Mourning Garment, Robert Greene used the term "Timonist" to refer to a lonely misanthrope. In his 1852 novel Pierre, Melville used the term "Timonism" about an artist's contemptuous rejection of both his audience and mankind in general.

Appreciation of the play often pivots on the reader's perception of Timon's asceticism. Admirers like Soellner point out that Shakespeare's text has Timon neither drink wine nor eat meat: only water and roots are specifically mentioned as being in his diet, which is also true of Apemantus. If one sees Timon's parties not as mere excuses to have fun, but as vain attempts to genuinely win friends among his peers, he gains sympathy. This is true of Pryce's Timon in the television version mentioned below, whose plate is explicitly shown as being perpetually unsoiled by food, and he tends to be meek and modest. This suggests a Timon who lives in the world but not of it. Other versions, often by creators who regard the play as a lesser work, involve jazz-era swinging (sometimes, such as in the Michael Langham/Brian Bedford production (in which Timon eats flamingo) set to a score that Duke Ellington composed for it in the 1960s), and conclude the first act with a debauchery. The Arkangel Shakespeare audio recording featuring Alan Howard (with Rodway reprising his television role) also takes this route: Howard's line readings suggest that Timon is getting drunker and drunker during the first act; he does not represent the moral or idealistic figure betrayed by the petty perceived by Soellner and Brecht the way Pryce does.

=== Themes and motifs ===
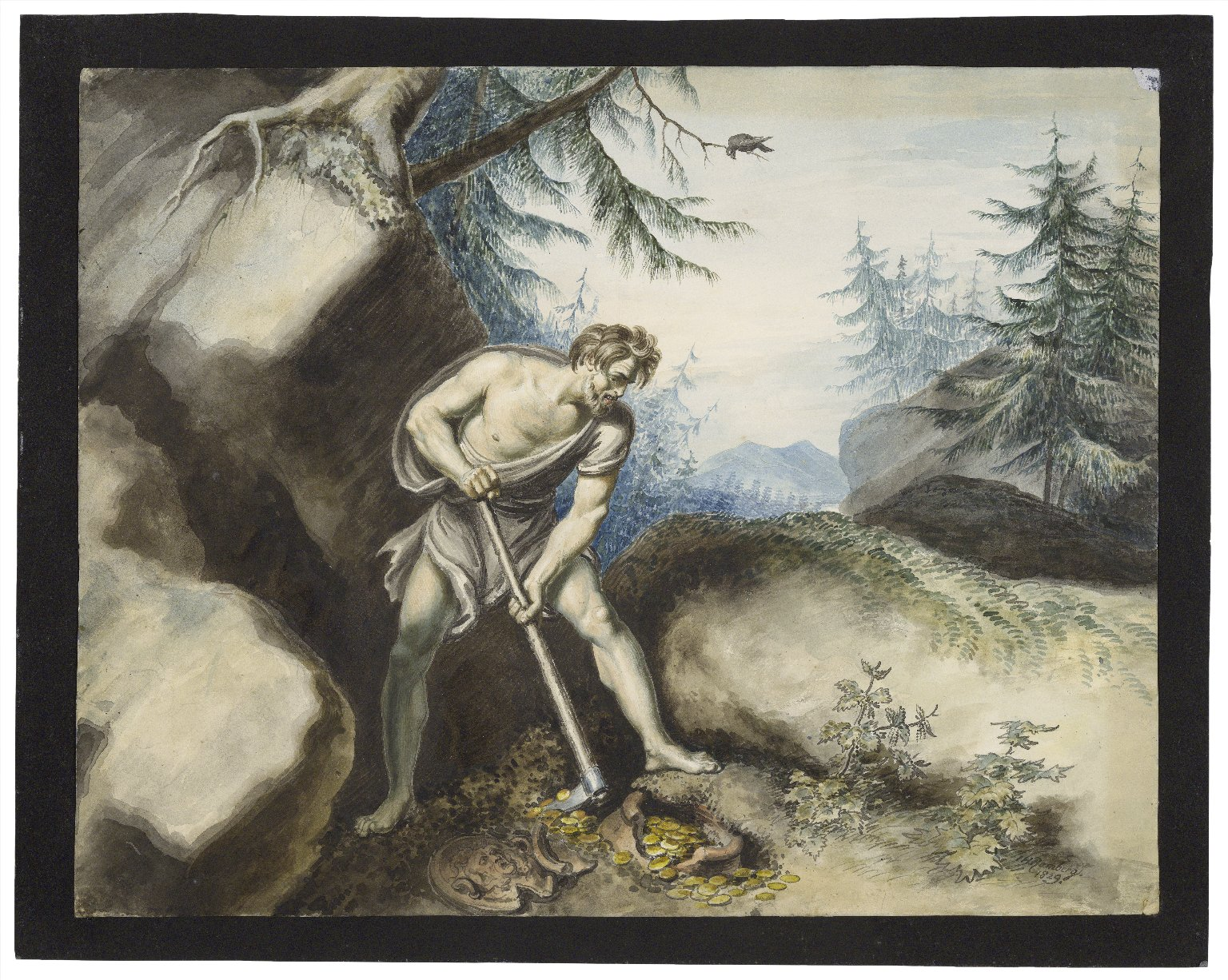
Drawing by Johann Heinrich Ramberg of Timon and the gold: act IV, scene iii

Banquets and feasting in Shakespeare are dramatically significant; besides sometimes being of central and structural importance, they often present dramatic spectacles in themselves. The first banquet of Timon of Athens reflects contemporary understandings of lavish Athenian entertainment at which Timon celebrates friendship and society. All the citizens are welcome to the banquet, as in accordance with the democratic principles of Athens. The second banquet functions as a parody of the first, as Timon uses it to exact revenge on his false friends, before abandoning feasting and the city completely by exiling himself. The senses are absent from this feast: Timon mocks the insatiable appetite of his guests as he uncovers dishes of smoke and water. Timon is misled by facades of friendship, and so inflicts apropos revenge: misleading those that had misled him by having them suffer the disillusionment of mortal senses with the mere spectacle of a banquet.

Shakespeare includes the character of Alcibiades in the play, the ultimate redeemer of iniquitous Athens. He would have been known among the educated of the audience for his presence at the Greek banquet in Plato's Symposium at which he gets the last word on the nature of love, proposing that it cannot be found in superficial appearance. Other motifs in Timon include gold (from act IV on), and "use" (in the sense of usury). One of the most common emendations of the play is the Poet's line "Our Poesie Is as a Gowne, which uses From whence 'tis nourisht", to "our poesy is as a gum, which oozes from whence 'tis nourished" (originated by Pope and Johnson). Soellner says that such emendations erode the importance of this motif, and suggests a better emendation would be "from" to "form," creating a mixed metaphor "revelatory of the poet's inanity." One odd emendation that often appears near the end of the play is Alcibiades commanding his troops to "cull th' infected fourth" from the Senate, as if he intends to destroy a fourth of the Senate. The word in the folio is, in fact, "forth", suggesting that "th' infected" are simply the ones who argued strongly against the cases of Timon and Alicibiades's officer, and that the troops are to leave alone those who just went along with it.

== Performance history ==
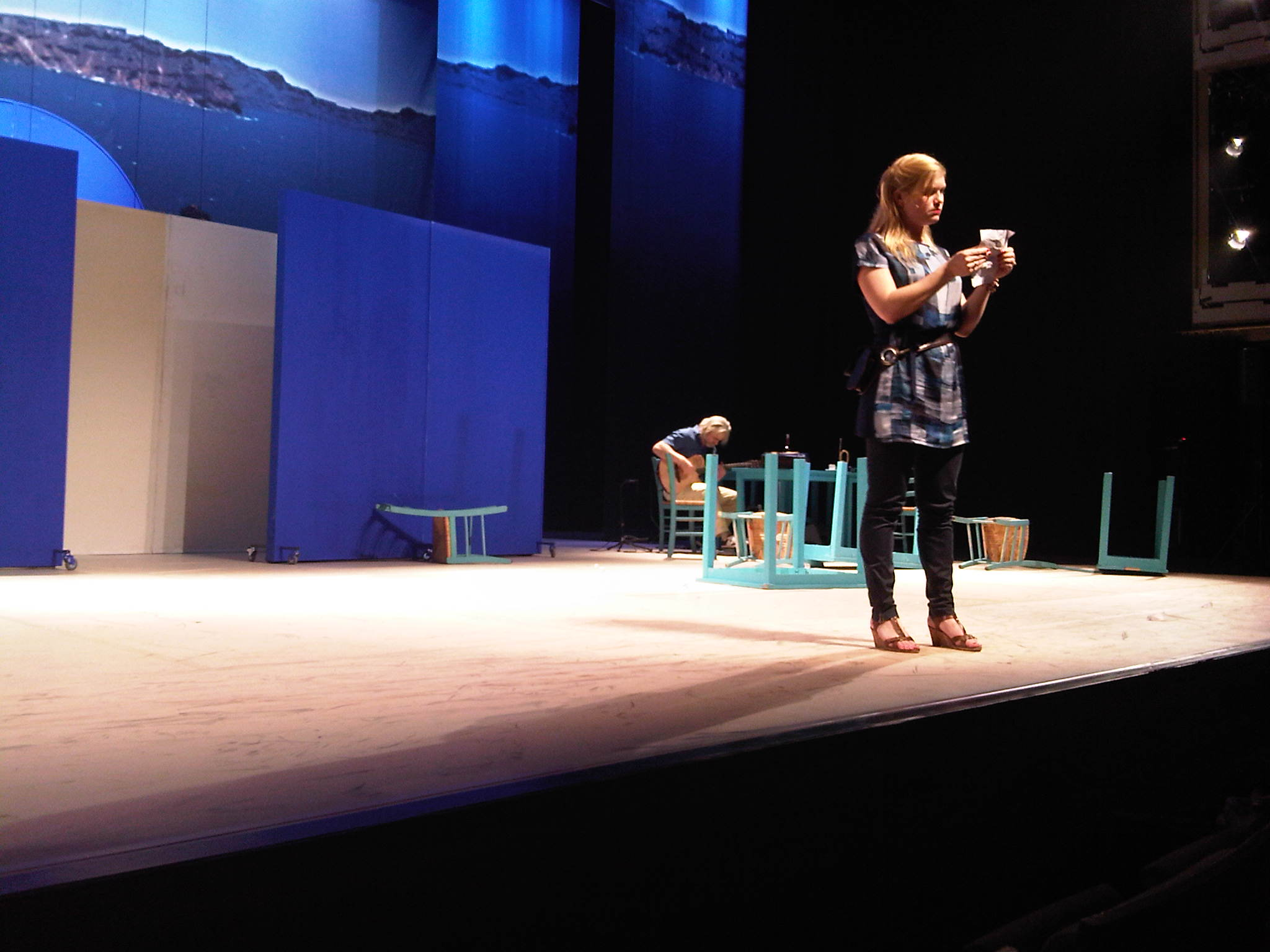
The Steward (played by Lore Dijkman) in a 2013 Dutch modern-dress performance by Toneelgroep Maastricht

Performance history in Shakespeare's lifetime is unknown, though the same is also true of his more highly regarded plays such as Antony and Cleopatra and Coriolanus, which most scholars believe were written in the same period. The earliest known performance of the straight Shakespearean text was at Smock Alley Theatre in Dublin in 1761.

The earliest-known production of a predominantly Shakespearean version of the play in the United Kingdom was at Sadler's Wells in 1851. James Earl Jones played the title character in a 1980 staging at the Yale Repertory Theater. The production also featured Yale School of Drama students Jane Kaczmarek, Reg E. Cathey, Kristine Nielsen, and David Alan Grier. When asked whether the role of Timon was tough, he responded "I can't think of it that way. It may be impossible, but it's not tough." Jones conditioned his participation in Timon on artistic director Lloyd Richards allowing him to also lead the American premiere of Athol Fugard's A Lesson from Aloes.

It has played once on Broadway, at the Lyceum Theatre in 1993, with Brian Bedford in the title role. This was a production of The Public Theater, which revived the play in February 2011 with Richard Thomas in the lead role, citing it as a play for the Great Recession. The Chicago Shakespeare Theater first staged the play in 1997. It was the company's first modern-dress production. In April 2012, C.S.T. again staged the play with the Scottish actor Ian McDiarmid playing Timon. The play was given a new ending by director Barbara Gaines.

In August 2011, the Hudson Shakespeare Company of New Jersey staged Timon of Athens as part of their summer Shakespeare in the Parks series. As a departure from several other modern dress productions, director Jon Ciccarelli set the action in the "Roaring 20s" with corrupt politicians, mobsters and making the characters of Alcibiades, Timon of Athens and Flavius veterans of World War I. Timon (Imran Sheikh) was portrayed as a 'Great Gatsby' type figure who loses his great fortune to corrupt "friends". In July 2012 the British National Theatre produced a version of the play set in modern dress and in the present time of scandal and fraud in the City of London and the British media. The play was directed by Nicholas Hytner. The National Theatre production was broadcast live to cinemas worldwide on 1 November 2012 as part of the National Theatre Live programme.

From 7 December 2018 to 22 February 2019 the play was revived by the Royal Shakespeare Company in a version directed by Simon Godwin, also in modern dress and featuring contemporary visual allusions, starring Kathryn Hunter as Lady Timon, one of several gender changes. Hunter and Godwin's version also had a run in New York City at Theatre for a New Audience in Brooklyn. The show opened on 19 January 2020, and ran through 9 February 2020. The following month the production played at the Shakespeare Theater Company's Kline Theatre in Washington DC. In 2024 the Australian Sport for Jove Theatre Company produced a version called I Hate People; or Timon of Athens, directed by Margaret Thanos and starring the company's artistic director Damien Ryan, at the Everglades, Leura. The production was described by The Sydney Morning Herald as the "pinnacle of Shakespeare in Sydney this century".

== Adaptations ==
=== TV adaptations ===
Rarely performed, Timon of Athens was produced for TV as part of the BBC Television Shakespeare series in 1981 with Jonathan Pryce as Timon, Norman Rodway as Apemantus, John Welsh as Flavius, and John Shrapnel as Alcibiades, with Diana Dors as Timandra, Tony Jay as the Merchant, Sebastian Shaw as the Old Athenian, and John Fortune and John Bird as Poet and Painter. This Elizabethan/Jacobean historical period drama production was directed by Jonathan Miller.

=== Film adaptations ===
I, Timon was released in 2016 premiered at the 2017 Hoboken International Film Festival (where it was nominated for "Best Director" and "Best Cinematography"). Bramwell Noah appears in the title role (and is also responsible for the original adaptation of the play for the big screen). The film also features a soundtrack based on the musical score Hexachordum Apollinis by Johann Pachelbel.

=== Play adaptations ===
In 1678 Thomas Shadwell produced a popular adaptation, The History of Timon of Athens, the Man-Hater, to which Henry Purcell later composed the music. Shadwell added two women to the plot: Melissa, Timon's faithless fiancee, and Evandre, his loyal and discarded mistress. James Dance made another adaptation in 1768, soon followed by Richard Cumberland's version at Drury Lane in 1771, in which the dying Timon gives his daughter, Evadne, not present in Shakespeare's original, to Alcibiades.

Further adaptations followed in 1786 (Thomas Hull's at Covent Garden) and 1816 (George Lamb's at Drury Lane), ending with an 1851 production reinstating Shakespeare's original text by Samuel Phelps at Sadler's Wells.

Peter Brook directed a French-language production in the sixties in which Timon was portrayed as an innocent idealist in a white tuxedo, ripped and dishevelled in the second part. His cast was primarily young, and Apemantus was Algerian. Commentators who admire the play typically see Timon as intended to have been a young man behaving in a naïve way. The play's detractors usually cite an oblique reference to armour in act IV as evidence that Timon is a long-retired soldier.

British playwright Glyn Cannon wrote a short adaptation of the play called Timon's Daughter. It premiered in May, 2008 at the Old Fitzroy Theatre in Sydney. Cannon's play revisits the major themes of charity and giving in the original work, with a story that follows the adventures of Timon's daughter (named "Alice" in Cannon's play) when she is taken in by Flavius (renamed "Alan").

=== Musical versions ===
Shadwell's adaptation of the play was first performed with music by Louis Grabu in 1678. More famously, the 1695 revival had new music by Henry Purcell, most of it appearing in the masque that ended act 2. Duke Ellington was commissioned to compose original music for the Stratford Shakespeare Festival's first production of Timon of Athens in 1963. Stephen Oliver, who wrote the incidental music for the BBC television version, composed a two-act opera, Timon of Athens, which was first performed at the London Coliseum on 17 May 1991.

== Cultural references ==
Ralph Waldo Emerson alludes to Timon in Essays: Second Series (1844) in an essay entitled "Gifts." Emerson says, "This giving is flat usurpation, and therefore when the beneficiary is ungrateful, as all beneficiaries hate all Timons ... I rather sympathize with the beneficiary, than with the anger of my lord Timon."

Karl Marx discusses and quotes Timon in his Economic and Philosophical Manuscripts of 1844 and Das Kapital, Volume I. Marx's analysis focuses on how passages from Timon of Athens (act IV, scene III) shed light on the nature and amoral power of money:

1. "It is the visible divinity – the transformation of all human and natural properties into their contraries, the universal confounding and distorting of things: impossibilities are soldered together by it."
2. "It is the common whore, the common procurer of people and nations."

Charlotte Brontë includes an allusion to Timon in Villette (1853). Ginevra Fanshawe affectionately nicknames Lucy "Timon," which highlights Ginevra's role as a foil for Lucy. Herman Melville references Timon repeatedly in his novel The Confidence-Man (1857), when referring to confidence as a preferable trait in all circumstances to misanthropy. Charles Dickens alludes to Timon in Great Expectations (1861) when Wopsle moves to London to pursue a life in the theatre. Thomas Hardy alludes to Timon in his short story, "The Three Strangers" (1883).

The English artist and writer Wyndham Lewis produced one work of art, a portfolio of drawings titled "Timon of Athens" (1913), a preliminary example of the style of art that would come to be called Vorticist.

Danish author Karen Blixen (Isak Dinesen) has a story within the tale titled "The Deluge of Norderney" in her Seven Gothic Tales (1934). It tells about a Hamlet-like figure, called Timon of Assens [sic], who comes from the Danish town of Assens.

Vladimir Nabokov borrowed the title for his novel Pale Fire (1962) from this quotation of Timon's in act IV, scene III:

The sun's a thief, and with his great attraction
Robs the vast sea: the moon's an arrant thief,
And her pale fire she snatches from the sun...

A copy of Timon of Athens features variously in the plot of Pale Fire and, at one point, the quotation above is amusingly mistranslated from the fictional language of Zemblan, a trademark prank of the polyglot Nabokov. The theme of thievery to which Timon is alluding is also a principal theme of Pale Fire, referring to Charles Kinbote's misappropriation of the poem by the deceased John Shade that forms part of the novel's structure.

A hermit meerkat in Walt Disney's popular animated feature film The Lion King is named Timon.

== Awards and nominations ==
=== 1993 Broadway revival ===
Year	Award	Category	Nominee	Result
1994	Tony Award	Best Revival of a Play		Nominated
1994	Tony Award	Best Actor in a Play	Brian Bedford	Nominated
1994	Tony Award	Best Direction of a Play	Michael Langham	Nominated
1994	Drama Desk Award	Outstanding Revival of a Play		Nominated
1994	Drama Desk Award	Outstanding Actor in a Play	Brian Bedford	Nominated
1994	Drama Desk Award	Outstanding Music in a Play	Duke Ellington and Stanley Silverman	Nominated
