= Theatre by the Lake =

Theatre in Keswick, England

Coordinates: 54.5955°N 3.1394°W

Theatre by the Lake, Keswick
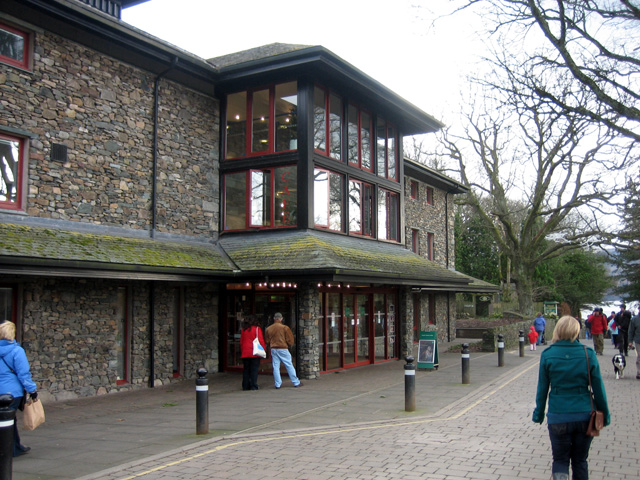
- Interactive map of Theatre by the Lake, Keswick
- Address: Lakeside; Keswick, Cumbria; England
- Owner: Cumbria Theatre Trust
- Capacity: Main House 400; Studio 100 (can vary between performances)

Construction
- Opened: 1999

Website
- www.theatrebythelake.com

Theatre by the Lake is situated on the shores of Derwentwater in the Lake District in Keswick, Cumbria, England. It opened in 1999, replacing the mobile Century Theatre, and was made possible by an Arts Council Lottery Fund Grant. From May to November a resident company of up to 1the 4 actors perform a Summer Season of six plays in repertory. The theatre also produces a Christmas show and two Spring shows (one in the Main House and one in the Studio). The theatre hosts festivals including the Words by the Water literature festival, the Jennings Keswick Jazz Festival, Keswick Film Festival and events in the Keswick Mountain Festival. In addition, the theatre offers a wide range of visiting drama, music, dance, talks, comedy and film.

== History ==
The mobile touring Century Theatre first visited Keswick in 1961 and settled full-time in the Lakeside car park on the shores of Derwentwater in 1975. Outline planning permission was granted for a permanent building on the site in 1991, and in 1996 the Century Theatre was moved to Snibston Discovery Museum to make way for it. Work on the building began in 1998; the ground was broken by the theatre's patron, Judi Dench. A significant proportion of the £6.5m building cost was contributed by the National Lottery. The name Theatre by the Lake was decided by public consultation and the first performance in the new building was on 19 August 1999.

The theatre has two auditoria: 400 seats in the Main House; and 100 seats in the Studio.

== Productions ==
| Year | Production | Writer | Dates | Auditorium | Notes |
|---|---|---|---|---|---|
| 1999 | Charley's Aunt | Brandon Thomas | 19 August – 6 November | Main House | |
| | The Lakers | James Plumptre | 2 September – 6 November | Main House | |
| | Two | Jim Cartwright | 9 September – 6 November | Main House | |
| | A Christmas Carol | Charles Dickens | 3 December 1999 – 8 January 2000 | Main House | Adapted by David Holman. |
| 2000 | Romeo and Juliet | William Shakespeare | 31 March – 22 April | Main House | Presented in the round. |
| | Noises Off | Michael Frayn | 27 May – 28 October | Main House | |
| | Dangerous Corner | J.B. Priestley | 9 June – 27 October | Main House | |
| | One Fine Day | Dennis Lumborg | 16 June – 27 October | Studio | |
| | My Cousin Rachel | Daphne du Maurier | 21 July – 23 October | Main House | Adapted by Diana Morgan. |
| | Noël and Gertie | Sheridan Morley | 28 July – 23 October | Studio | Included five performances in the Main House. |
| | The Snow Queen | Stuart Paterson | 1 December 2000 – 6 January 2001 | Main House | From the story by Hans Christian Andersen |
| 2001 | The Mother | Bertolt Brecht | 16–24 February | Main House | A co-production with Visiting Moon. |
| | Twelfth Night | William Shakespeare | 23 March – 14 April | Main House | |
| | Anorak of Fire | Stephen Dinsdale | 25 May – 27 October | Studio | |
| | Habeas Corpus | Alan Bennett | 26 May – 27 October | Main House | |
| | The Real Inspector Hound/Black Comedy | Tom Stoppard/Peter Shaffer | 8 June – 24 October | Main House | Double bill. |
| | Skylight | David Hare | 15 June – 24 October | Studio | |
| | Mrs Warren's Profession | George Bernard Shaw | 20 July – 26 October | Main House | |
| | Betrayal | Harold Pinter | 27 July – 26 October | Studio | |
| | The Wizard of Oz | L. Frank Baum | 30 November 2001 – 19 January 2002 | Main House | 1987 musical adaptation originally performed by the RSC. |
| 2002 | One Fine Day | Dennis Lumborg | 7 February – 1 March | Studio | |
| | Neville's Island | Tim Firth | 15 March – 6 April | Main House | |
| | Hello and Goodbye | Athol Fugard | 24 May – 26 October | Studio | |
| | The Good Companions | J.B. Priestley | 25 May – 26 October | Main House | Adapted by Bob Eaton and Sayan Kent. |
| | The Woman in Black | Susan Hill | 7 June – 23 October | Main House | Adapted by Stephen Mallatratt. |
| | In Flame | Charlotte Jones | 14 June – 23 October | Studio | |
| | All My Sons | Arthur Miller | 19 July – 25 October | Main House | |
| | Speed-the-Plow | David Mamet | 26 July – 25 October | Studio | |
| | Alice's Adventures in Wonderland | Lewis Carroll | 29 November 2002 – 18 January 2003 | Main House | |
| | Tom Thumb | | 18 December 2002 – 11 January 2003 | Studio | A co-production with Collaborators Theatre Company. |
| 2003 | A Passionate Woman | Kay Mellor | 2–26 April | Main House | A co-production with the Gateway Theatre in Chester. |
| | Season's Greetings | Alan Ayckbourn | 24 May – 31 October | Main House | |
| | Wallflowering | Peta Murray | 24 May – 31 October | Studio | |
| | Blithe Spirit | Noël Coward | 6 June – 1 November | Main House | |
| | Kiss of the Spider Woman | Manuel Puig | 13 June – 1 November | Studio | Translated by Allan Baker. |
| | The Tenant of Wildfell Hall | Anne Brontë | 18 July – 29 October | Main House | Adapted by Lisa Evans. |
| | Not a Game for Boys | Simon Block | 25 July – 29 October | Studio | |
| | Sleeping Beauty | | 5 December 2003 – 17 January 2004 | Main House | Retold for the stage by Charles Way. |
| 2004 | The Hired Man | Melvyn Bragg | 27 March – 17 April | Main House | Music and lyrics by Howard Goodall. |
| | Sailor, Beware! | Philip King and Falkland Cary | 29 May – 5 November | Main House | |
| | Blue/Orange | Joe Penhall | 29 May – 5 November | Studio | |
| | Arms and the Man | George Bernard Shaw | 11 June – 6 November | Main House | |
| | Ghosts | Henrik Ibsen | 18 June – 6 November | Studio | |
| | Strangers on a Train | Patricia Highsmith | 23 July – 3 November | Main House | Adapted by Craig Warner. |
| | Tramping Like Mad | Julie McKiernan | 30 July – 3 November | Studio | |
| | Cinderella | Stuart Paterson | 3 December 2004 – 15 January 2005 | Main House | A reworking of the classic story. |
| 2005 | Closer | Patrick Marber | 23–26 February | Studio | |
| | April in Paris | John Godber | 18 March – 9 April | Main House | |
| | Dick Barton: Special Agent | Phil Willmott | 28 May – 4 November | Main House | |
| | Playhouse Creatures | April De Angelis | 28 May – 4 November | Studio | |
| | Gaslight | Patrick Hamilton | 10 June – 5 November | Main House | |
| | Dead Funny | Terry Johnson | 17 June – 5 November | Studio | |
| | Les Liaisons Dangereuses | Christopher Hampton | 22 July – 2 November | Main House | |
| | A Number | Caryl Churchill | 29 July – 2 November | Studio | |
| | Only Available in Carlisle | Charlotte Allan | 22–26 November | Studio | |
| | The Wind in the Willows | Kenneth Grahame | 3 December 2005 – 21 January 2006 | Main House | |
| 2006 | On Golden Pond | Ernest Thompson | 31 March – 22 April | Main House | |
| | Private Lives | Noël Coward | 27 May – 3 November | Main House | |
| | The Birthday Party | Harold Pinter | 27 May – 3 November | Studio | |
| | Loot | Joe Orton | 9 June – 4 November | Main House | |
| | Frozen | Bryony Lavery | 16 June – 4 November | Studio | |
| | The Deep Blue Sea | Terence Rattigan | 21 July – 1 November | Main House | |
| | After Miss Julie | Patrick Marber | 28 July – 1 November | Studio | |
| | Sinbad: the Untold Tale! | Charles Way | 1 December 2006 – 13 January 2007 | Main House | A reworking of the Arabian Nights tale. |
| 2007 | Of Mice and Men | John Steinbeck | 24 March – 21 April | Main House | |
| | Around the World in Eighty Days | Jules Verne | 26 May – 2 November | Main House | Freely adapted and with original songs by Phil Willmott. |
| | Who's Afraid of Virginia Woolf? | Edward Albee | 26 May – 2 November | Studio | |
| | Taking Steps | Alan Ayckbourn | 8 June – 3 November | Main House | |
| | Under the Blue Sky | David Eldridge | 15 June – 3 November | Studio | |
| | Rebecca | Daphne du Maurier | 20 July – 31 October | Main House | Adapted by Frank McGuinness. |
| | Days of Wine and Roses | J.P. Miller | 27 July – 31 October | Studio | In a new version by Owen McCafferty. |
| | The Borrowers | Charles Way after Mary Norton | 1 December 2007 – 12 January 2008 | Main House | Adapted by Charles Way. |
| 2008 | The Recruiting Officer | George Farquhar | 9 February – 5 April | Main House | |
| | Our Country's Good | Timberlake Wertenbaker | 15 March – 5 April | Main House | |
| | Arsenic and Old Lace | Joseph Kesselring | 24 May – 5 November | Main House | |
| | The Bogus Woman | Kay Adshead | 24 May – 5 November | Studio | |
| | The Lady in the Van | Alan Bennett | 6 June – 7 November | Main House | |
| | The Lonesome West | Martin McDonagh | 13 June – 7 November | Studio | |
| | The Importance of Being Earnest | Oscar Wilde | 18 July – 8 November | Main House | |
| | The Caretaker | Harold Pinter | 25 July – 8 November | Studio | |
| | A Christmas Carol | Charles Dickens | 29 November 2008 – 17 January 2009 | Main House | Adapted by David Holman. |
| 2009 | The Maid of Buttermere | Melvyn Bragg | 21 March – 18 April | Main House | Adapted by Lisa Evans. |
| | A Chorus of Disapproval | Alan Ayckbourn | 23 May – 4 November | Main House | |
| | Blackbird | David Harrower | 23 May – 4 November | Studio | |
| | Summer Lightning | P.G. Wodehouse | 5 June – 6 November | Main House | Adapted by Giles Havergal. |
| | The Memory of Water | Shelagh Stephenson | 12 June – 6 November | Studio | |
| | A Midsummer Night's Dream | William Shakespeare | 17 July – 7 November | Main House | |
| | For All Time | Rick Thomas | 24 July – 7 November | Studio | |
| | Grimm Tales | Carol Ann Duffy | 28 November 2009 – 9 January 2010 | Main House | The Box Office takings from one performance were donated to victims of the 2009 floods in Keswick and Cockermouth. |
| 2010 | Stones in His Pockets | Marie Jones | 27 March – 17 April | Main House | |
| | Northanger Abbey | Jane Austen | 29 May – 5 November | Main House | Adapted by Tim Luscombe. |
| | Shining City | Conor McPherson | 29 May – 5 November | Studio | |
| | What The Butler Saw | Joe Orton | 11 June – 6 November | Main House | |
| | Silence | Moira Buffini | 18 June – 6 November | Studio | |
| | Bus Stop | William Inge | 23 July – 3 November | Main House | |
| | The Glass Menagerie | Tennessee Williams | 30 July – 3 November | Studio | |
| | Tom's Midnight Garden | Philippa Pearce | 27 November 2010 – 5 January 2011 | Main House | Adapted by David Williams. |
| 2011 | Quicksand | Zosia Wand | 16–26 February | Studio | Premièred at the Dukes, Lancaster. |
| | A View from the Bridge | Arthur Miller | 1–23 April | Main House | |
| | Noises Off | Michael Frayn | 28 May – 9 November | Main House | |
| | The Blue Room | David Hare | 28 May – 9 November | Studio | Adapted from Arthur Schnitzler's La Ronde. |
| | Hay Fever | Noël Coward | 10 June – 7 November | Main House | |
| | Dumb Show | Joe Penhall | 17 June – 7 November | Studio | |
| | Keep Smiling Through | Lisa Evans | 30 July – 11 November | Main House | World première. |
| | Someone Who'll Watch Over Me | Frank McGuinness | 5 August – 11 November | Studio | |
| | The Firework-Maker's Daughter | Philip Pullman | 26 November 2011 – 7 January 2012 | Main House | Adapted by Stephen Russell. |
| 2012 | The History Boys | Alan Bennett | 24 March – 21 April | Main House | |
| | Bedroom Farce | Alan Ayckbourn | 22 May – 7 November | Main House | |
| | A Doll's House | Henrik Ibsen | 22 May – 7 November | Studio | A new adaptation by Bryony Lavery. |
| | Dry Rot | John Chapman | 1 June – 9 November | Main House | |
| | Colder Than Here | Laura Wade | 8 June – 9 November | Studio | Regional première. |
| | Great Expectations | Charles Dickens | 20 July – 10 November | Main House | Adapted for the stage by Neil Bartlett. In association with Cumbria Life. |
| | Roma and the Flannelettes: A Love Like Yours | Richard Cameron | 27 July – 10 November | Studio | World première. |
| | The Railway Children | Edith Nesbit | 1 December 2012 – 19 January 2013 | Main House | Adapted by Mike Kenny. |
| 2013 | Old Herbaceous | Reginald Arkell | 14 – 23 March | Studio | Dramatised by Alfred Shaughnessy. |
| | Rogue Herries | Hugh Walpole | 23 March – 20 April | Main House | Adapted by Louise Page. |
| | See How They Run | Philip King | 25 May – 9 November | Main House | |
| | Vincent in Brixton | Nicholas Wright | 25 May – 9 November | Studio | |
| | An Inspector Calls | J.B. Priestley | 7 June – 6 November | Main House | |
| | 'Tis Pity She's a Whore | John Ford | 14 June – 6 November | Studio | |
| | She Stoops to Conquer | Oliver Goldsmith | 26 July – 8 November | Main House | |
| | The Shape of Things | Neil LaBute | 2 August – 8 November | Studio | |
| | Swallows & Amazons | Arthur Ransome | 30 November 2013 – 18 January 2014 | Main House | Adapted by Helen Edmundson, with songs by Neil Hannon. This adaptation was first performed by the Bristol Old Vic in 2010. |
| 2014 | Not About Heroes | Stephen MacDonald | 22 March – 5 April | Studio | |
| | Dancing at Lughnasa | Brian Friel | 23 March – 20 April | Main House | |
| | Rookery Nook | Ben Travers | 24 May – 5 November | Main House | |
| | The Winterling | Jez Butterworth | 24 May – 5 November | Studio | |
| | Dracula | Liz Lochhead | 7 June – 7 November | Main House | Adapted from Bram Stoker's novel. |
| | Seeing the Lights | Brendan Murray | 13 June – 7 November | Studio | The world première. |
| | The Comedy of Errors | William Shakespeare | 26 July – 8 November | Main House | |
| | Old Times | Harold Pinter | 1 August – 8 November | Studio | |
| | Peter Pan | J.M. Barrie | 29 November 2014 – 31 January 2015 | Main House | |
| 2015 | Two | Jim Cartwright | 20 March – 14 April | Studio | |
| | The 39 Steps | John Buchan and Alfred Hitchcock | 23 May – 4 November | Main House | Adapted by Patrick Barlow from an original concept by Simon Corble and Nobby Dimon. |
| | Suddenly Last Summer | Tennessee Williams | 23 May – 4 November | Studio | |
| | Abigail's Party | Mike Leigh | 6 June – 6 November | Main House | |
| | The Lady of the Lake | Benjamin Askew | 13 June – 6 November | Studio | The world première. |
| | Fallen Angels | Noël Coward | 25 July – 7 November | Main House | |
| | Enlightenment | Shelagh Stephenson | 1 August – 7 November | Studio | The regional première. |
| | The Snow Queen | Hans Christian Andersen | 28 November 2015 – 16 January 2016 | Main House | Adapted by Charles Way. |
| | The Bogus Woman | Kay Adshead | 19–28 November | Studio | A Curtis Productions & Theatre by the Lake co-production in association with Mama Quilla Productions. |
| | Bear & Butterfly | Annie McCourt | 15–24 December | Studio | A Theatre Hullabaloo and Theatre by the Lake co-production based on an original story by Gordon Poad. |
| 2016 | The Shepherd's Life | James Rebank, adapted by Chris Monks | Sat 26 March - Sat 23 April | Main House | A Theatre by the Lake production |
| | The Professor of Adventure | Peter MacQueen | Sat 19 March - Tue 5 April | Studio | A PMac and Theatre by the Lake production |
| | Watch it, Sailor! | Philip King and Falkland L. Cary | Sat 28 May - Sat 5 November | Main House | A Theatre by the Lake production |
| | The Vertical Hour | David Hare | Sat 28 May - Sat 5 November | Studio | A Theatre by the Lake production |
| | Dial M for Murder | Frederick Knott | Sat 11 June - Wed 2 November | Main House | A Theatre by the Lake production |
| | Elektra | Sophokles, translated by Anne Carson | Sat 18 June - Wed 2 November | Studio | A Theatre by the Lake production |
| | The Rivals | Richard Brinsley Sheridan | Sat 30 July - Fri 4 November | Main House | A Theatre by the Lake production |
| | Iron | Rona Munro | Sat 6 August - Fri 4 November | Studio | A Theatre by the Lake production |
| | The Emperor and the Nightingale | Neil Duffield, based on The Nightingale by Hans Christian Andersen | Sat 26 November - Sat 14 January | Main House | A Theatre by the Lake production |
| 2017 | Two Way Mirror | Arthur Miller | Fri 17 - Sat 25 March & Mon 10 - Sat 22 April | Studio | A Theatre by the Lake production |
| | William Wordsworth | Nicholas Perpan | Fri 31 March - Sat 22 April | Main House | A Theatre by the Lake and English Touring Theatre co-production |
| | After the Dance | Terence Rattigan | Thu 25 May - Sat 4 November | Main House | A Theatre by the Lake production |
| | Handbagged | Moira Buffini | Thu 15 June - Fri 3 November | Main House | A Theatre by the Lake production |
| | As You Like It | William Shakespeare | Fri 7 July - Sat 4 November | Main House | A Theatre by the Lake and Shared Experience co-production |
| | How My Light is Spent | Alan Harris | Wed 31 May - Sat 24 June | Studio | A Theatre by the Lake, The Royal Exchange Theatre, and Sherman Theatre co-production |
| | Miss Julie | August Strindberg, a new adaption by Howard Brenton | Fri 30 June - Fri 30 November | Studio | A Theatre by the Lake and Jermyn Street Theatre co-production |
| | Remarkable Invisible | Laura Eason | Fri 11 August - Sat 4 November | Studio | A Theatre by the Lake production |
| | The Secret Garden | Frances Hodgson Burnett, adapted by Jessica Swale | Fri 24 November 2017 - Sat 13 January 2018 | Main House | A Theatre by the Lake production |
| 2018 | A Streetcar Named Desire | Tennessee Williams | Tue 3 - Sat 7 April | Main House | An English Touring Theatre, Nuffield Southampton Theatres and THeatr Clwyd production |
| | Great Expectations | Charles Dickens, adapted by Ken Brantley | Tue 10 - Sat 14 April | Main House | A Tilted Wig and Malvern Theatres Production |
| | Hymn to Love - Homage to Piaf | Steve Trafford | Fri 23 March - Tue 10 April | Studio | A Theatre by the Lake and York Theatre Royal production, in association with Ensemble |
| | Jeeves and Wooster in Perfect Nonsense | P.G. Wodehouse by The Goodale Brothers | Thu 24 May - Sat 27 October | Main House | A Theatre by the Lake production |
| | Single Spies | Alan Bennett | Thu 14 June - Wed 24 October | Main House | A Theatre by the Lake production |
| | Sense and Sensibility | Jane Austen, adapted by Jessica Swale | Thu 9 August - Fri 26 October | Main House | A Theatre by the Lake production |
| | Rails | Simon Longman | Thu 24 May - Sat 27 October | Studio | A Theatre by the Lake production |
| | Bold Girls | Rona Munro | Thu 21 June - Wed 24 October | Studio | A Theatre by the Lake production |
| | The Other Place | Sharr White | Thu 1 - Sat 10 November | Main House | A Theatre by the Lake and Park Theatre co-production in association with Abinger Productions |
| | Beauty and the Beast | Laurence Boswell | Fri 23 November - Sat 12 January | Main House | A Theatre by the Lake production |
| 2019 | The Picture of Dorian Gray | Oscar Wilde, adapted by Sean Aydon | Mon 8 - Sat 13 April | Main House | A Tilted Wig, Malvern Theatres and Churchill Theatre production |
| | Educating Rita | Willy Russell | Thu 18 - Sat 27 April | Main House | A Theatre by the Lake and David Pugh & Dafydd Rogers co-production |
| | Creditors | August Strindberg, a new version by Howard Brenton | Fri 22 March - Sat 20 April | Studio | A Theatre by the Lake and Jermyn Street Theatre co-production |
| | The Ladykillers | Grahamn Linehan | Fri 24 May - Wed 30 October | Main House | A Theatre by the Lake production |
| | The Rise and Fall of Little Voice | Jim Cartwright | Thu 6 June - Fri 1 November | Main House | A Theatre by the Lake production |
| | Dear Uncle | Anton Chekhov, adapted by Alan Ayckbourn | Thu 1 August - Sat 2 November | Main House | A Theatre by the Lake production |
| | My Mother Said I Never Should | Charlotte Keatley | Thu 23 May - Wed 30 October | Studio | A Theatre by the Lake production |
| | The Children | Lucy Kirkwood | Thu 6 June - Fri 1 November | Studio | A Theatre by the Lake production |
| | Guards at the Taj | Rajiv Joseph | Thu 8 August - Sat 2 November | Studio | A Theatre by the Lake production |
| | A Christmas Carol | By Patrick Barlow, adapted from the story by Charles Dickens | Fri 22 November - Sat 11 January | Main House | A Theatre by the Lake production |
