= Shaftesbury Theatre =

West End theatre in London

- New Prince's Theatre, 1911–1914; Prince's Theatre, 1914–1963; Judi Dench Theatre, 2027–
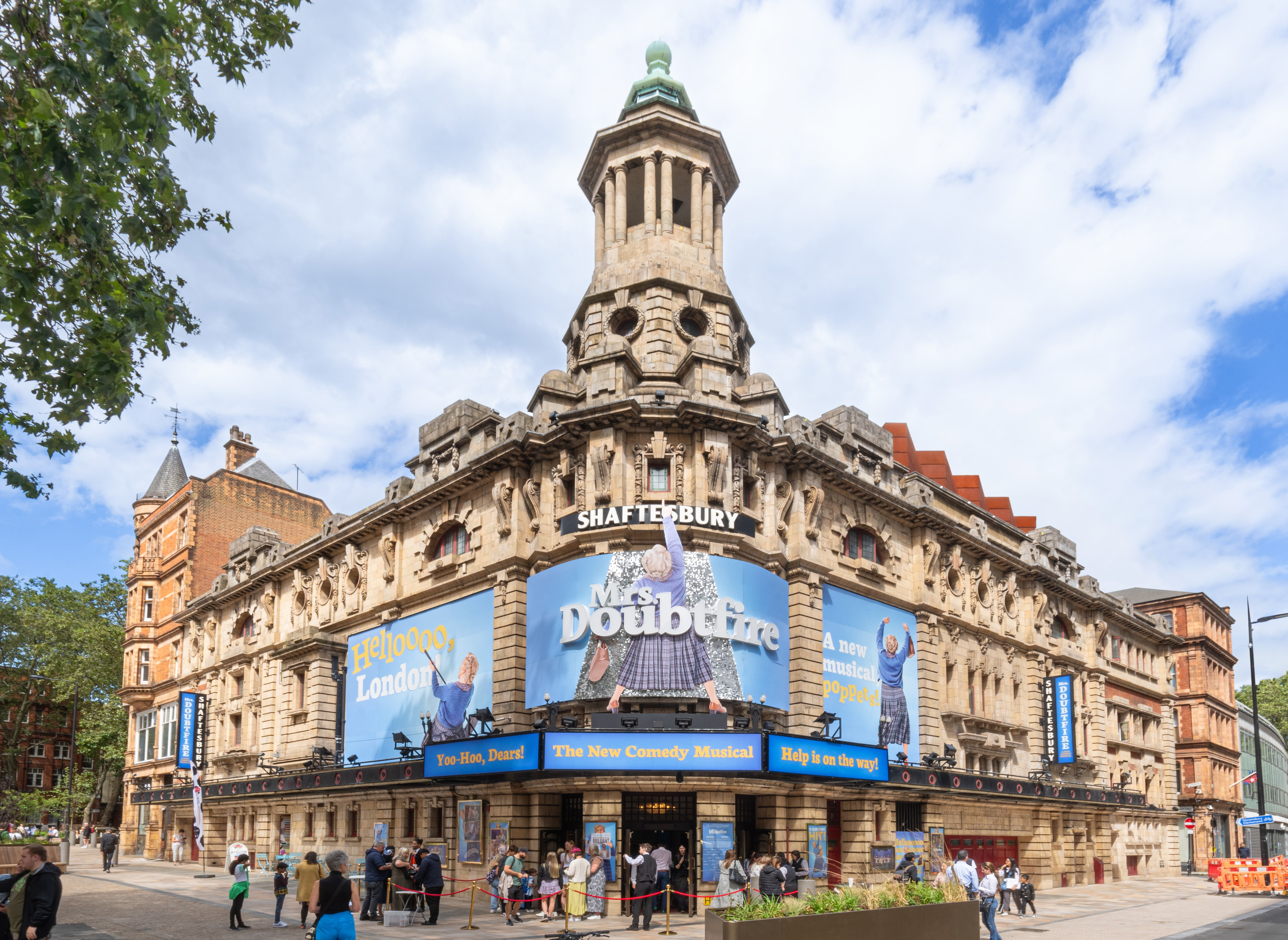
- The Shaftesbury Theatre in 2023, showing Mrs. Doubtfire
- Interactive map of Shaftesbury Theatre
- Address: Shaftesbury Avenue; London, WC2; United Kingdom
- Coordinates: 51°30′58″N 00°07′33″W
- Owner: DLT Entertainment
- Capacity: 1,416
- Type: West End Theatre
- Designation: Grade II
- Production: Avenue Q
- Public transit: Tottenham Court Road

Construction
- Opened: 26 December 1911; 114 years ago
- Architect: Bertie Crewe

Website
- shaftesburytheatre.com

The Shaftesbury Theatre (to be known as the Judi Dench Theatre from February 2027) is a West End theatre, located in Shaftesbury Avenue, in the London Borough of Camden. It opened in 1911 as the New Prince's Theatre, with a capacity of 2,500. The current capacity is 1,416. The title "Shaftesbury Theatre" belonged to another theatre lower down the avenue between 1888 and 1941. The Prince's adopted the name in 1963.

The theatre, the last to be built in Shaftesbury Avenue, was originally intended to house popular melodramas, but has presented a wide range of productions, including Shakespeare, farce, opera, ballet and revue. Companies based at the theatre for London seasons have included the D'Oyly Carte Opera Company, the Ballets Russes, Sadler's Wells Opera, Sadler's Wells Ballet, the Royal Swedish Ballet and the dance companies of Uday Shankar and Pearl Primus.

The theatre has presented many musicals that premiered on Broadway, from Funny Face in the 1920s to Pal Joey and Wonderful Town in the 1950s, How to Succeed in Business Without Really Trying and Hair in the 1960s, and more recently Hairspray, Memphis, Motown and Mrs Doubtfire.

The theatre was at risk of demolition in the early 1970s to make way for new roads or for commercial development, but the Save London's Theatres campaign rescued it, and it was given listed building protection in 1974. The actor, playwright and impresario Ray Cooney led a new organisation, The Theatre of Comedy, backed by a substantial group of actors and writers, which leased and then bought the theatre as a home for British comedy. The Theatre of Comedy parent company, DLT Entertainment, now owns the theatre and programming has expanded from farces and comedies to now include musicals.

== History ==
=== Early years ===
The theatre was designed for the brothers Walter and Frederick Melville by Bertie Crewe and opened on 26 December 1911, the last new theatre to open in Shaftesbury Avenue. The site, at the junction of Shaftesbury Avenue and High Holborn, had previously been what the theatre historians Mander and Mitchenson call "a maze of derelict property". It was originally named the New Prince's Theatre, becoming the Prince's Theatre in 1914. The original capacity of the auditorium was 2,500. The exterior is faced in terracotta and brick stone with a three-tier façade of vertically aligned windows, topped by a pillared cupola above the entrance. The New Prince's was London's first entirely steel-framed theatre, with no supporting pillars in the auditorium to obstruct the view. The original colour scheme of the auditorium was cream and gold.

Monsieur Beaucaire (1919), starring Maggie Teyte

The Brothers Melville, who were already running the Lyceum Theatre, London, intended to continue their policy of staging popular melodramas. Early shows at the New Princes included Carlton Wallace's The Apple of Eden (1912), Arthur Shirley and Ben Landeck's Women and Wine (1912) and Walter Howard's romantic drama The Story of the Rosary, (1913), In 1913 the theatre presented a comedy, Brewster's Millions, and Shakespeare's The Merchant of Venice with Frank Cellier as Shylock, but reverted to melodrama with On His Majesty's Service (1914), When London Sleeps (1915) and For England, Home, and Beauty (1915), which ran for a hundred performances.

In December 1916 Seymour Hicks took over the management, opening with a revival of Bluebell in Fairyland and then reviving The Catch of the Season (February 1917), followed by other popular favourites in his repertory. In 1919 C. B. Cochran succeeded Hicks in the management of the theatre, and in April it had a critical and box-office success with André Messager's romantic opera Monsieur Beaucaire, starring Maggie Teyte; it ran for 221 performances. From September of that year the theatre presented a sell-out eighteen-week season of Gilbert and Sullivan operas by the D'Oyly Carte Opera Company, returning to the West End for the first time since 1908. During the season the company presented ten Savoy operas including the first revival of the 1884 work Princess Ida.

=== 1920s ===
From February 1920 Pretty Peggy, a musical, ran for 168 performances. In 1920 the perennial favourite Charley's Aunt played at the Prince's for the Christmas season. In April 1921 Sarah Bernhardt appeared in the title role of Daniel in a play by Louis Verneuil, and Sergei Diaghilev's Ballets Russes presented a season including Petrushka, The Rite of Spring, and Les Sylphides, starring Lydia Lopokova.

Ruddigore, revived at the Prince's in 1921

D'Oyly Carte returned in October 1921 for a 27-week season during which Ruddigore was seen in London for the first time since the original 1887 run. There followed Lucien Guitry, Sacha Guitry and Yvonne Printemps in a season of French plays; a musical called The Cousin from Nowhere (1923); The Return of Sherlock Holmes starring Eille Norwood; a comedy, Alf's Button, by W. A. Darlington (1924); and José Collins in a musical play by Franz Lehár (1925).

There were two further successful D'Oyly Carte seasons in 1924 and 1926; the latter attracted widespread notice for controversial new designs for The Mikado by Charles Ricketts. Sybil Thorndike appeared in Macbeth with Henry Ainley (1926), and Diaghilev's company returned for a season in 1927, with a programme that included the British premiere of Nijinska and Poulenc's Les biches (under the title The House Party). In December 1927 George Robey presented his revue Bits and Pieces. The following year Fred and Adele Astaire starred in the Gershwins' musical Funny Face, with Leslie Henson. The run was interrupted by a gas explosion in High Holborn not far from the theatre, but after the reopening the show completed a run of 263 performances. The last major production of the 1920s was a farce, A Warm Corner, starring W. H. Berry; it ran for 238 performances from December 1929.

=== 1930s ===
In 1930 Berry had another substantial run of 195 performances in another farce, Oh, Daddy. For the next few years short runs and revivals predominated at the Prince's. In 1933 Charles Macdona revived Victorien Sardou's Diplomacy with an all-star cast that included Gerald du Maurier, Lewis Casson, Basil Rathbone, Margaret Bannerman and Joyce Kennedy.

During the 1934 season the Prince's featured a revival of Edward German and Basil Hood's comic opera Merrie England, which ran for 187 performances. It was followed by a revival of Sullivan and Hood's The Rose of Persia the following year – the first professional staging of the piece since the original London run in 1899–1900. It did not achieve the success of the revival of Merrie England, closing after 25 performances. In 1935 there was a rare venture into the classics, with a revival of The Alchemist. Two of Ian Hay's adaptations of Edgar Wallace stories followed: The Frog (1936, 483 performances) and The Gusher (1937, 137 performances).

A 1938 success, with 260 performances, was Wild Oats, described as "a song and laugh show" with music by Noel Gay and words by Douglas Furber. (Note: This Wild Oats had no connexion with the much revived 1781 comedy of the same name, which had not been seen in London since 1891.) In March 1939, aiming to attract a new, younger, audience to the theatre, J. B. Priestley arranged to have his comedy When We Are Married – which had run successfully at the St Martin's Theatre at normal West End prices – transferred to the Prince's with tickets at half the usual price. Sitting Pretty (1939) was a comedy starring Sydney Howard. Towards the end of the year, Firth Shephard launched a topical revue, Shephard's Pie.

=== 1940s ===
Jessie Matthews (1926 photograph), star of Wild Rose

Productions during the Second World War included another Shephard revue, Fun and Games (August 1941, with a cast including Sydney Howard, Carol Raye and Richard Hearne); Wild Rose (August 1942, a revised version of the 1920 musical Sally, starring Jessie Matthews); Old Chelsea (February 1943, starring Richard Tauber), and Halfway to Heaven (December 1943, a comedy starring Howard and Bobby Howes).

Sadler's Wells Theatre being closed for the duration of the war, its opera and ballet companies toured, and in 1944 based themselves at the Prince's for London seasons. The opera season included The Bartered Bride, La bohème, Madame Butterfly, Rigoletto, The Marriage of Figaro and Cosi fan tutte; the company was led by Joan Cross, and included Peter Pears, Owen Brannigan and Rose Hill. The ballet season presented twelve works, including Coppélia, Swan Lake, Carnaval and the premiere of Miracle in the Gorbals, with choreography by Robert Helpmann and music by Arthur Bliss; the company included Helpmann, Margot Fonteyn, Alexis Rassine and Moira Shearer.

In 1945 Evelyn Laye starred in Oscar Straus's operetta Three Waltzes, and later in that year Merrie England was revived in a radically revised version by Edward Knoblock, with a cast including Heddle Nash and Dennis Noble. In 1946 the theatre staged another Shephard revue, The Shephard Show, with Hearne, Arthur Riscoe, Douglas Byng and Marie Burke. In 1947 the Prince's came under the direction of Bertram Montague though, according to Mander and Mitchenson, "the new productions were not so successful as the ballet seasons from many parts of the world and the annual pantomimes".

=== 1950s ===
The next play to achieve a long run was His Excellency, a comedy by Dorothy and Campbell Christie, starring Eric Portman and Sebastian Shaw; it opened in May 1950 and ran for 452 performances. In 1951 the theatre presented seasons of dance by Uday Shankar and his Indian Dancers, Pearl Primus and her African Dance company and the Royal Swedish Ballet.

Montague's management ended in 1952. The freehold of the theatre remained in the Melville family until 1961; between 1957 and 1961 the theatre was directed by Andrew Melville. Mander and Mitchenson record that after Montague's withdrawal the theatre was "more often closed than open, though occasional seasons had their successes". The successes included Maurice Chevalier in a limited season in 1952 (presented by Jack Hylton, who had become the lessee of the Prince's) and Antony and Cleopatra from the Shakespeare Memorial Theatre, Stratford-upon-Avon, with Michael Redgrave and Peggy Ashcroft in 1953. Two musicals that premiered on Broadway, Pal Joey (1954) and Wonderful Town (1955), ran for 245 and 207 performances respectively. Summer Song, a musical about and reusing music by Antonín Dvořák ran from February to June 1955. The D'Oyly Carte Company returned in 1956 and 1958, for 13-week seasons on each occasion, launching a new production of Patience during the first.

=== 1960s ===
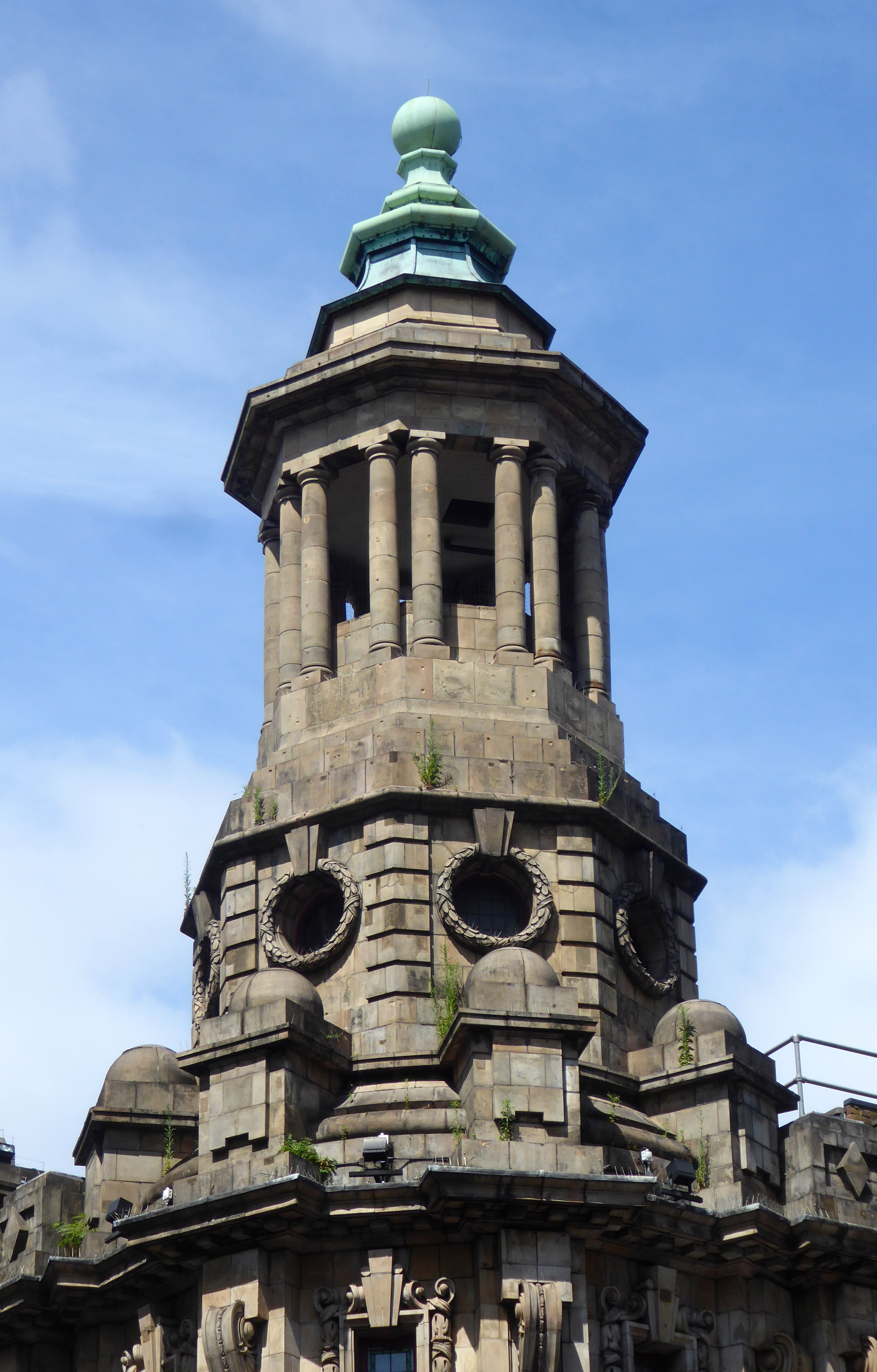
Detail of turret atop the theatre

D'Oyly Carte made its last Prince's appearances in 1960–61, a nine-week season, presenting ten operas. In the early 1960s the ownership of the theatre changed hands several times. In June 1961, Hylton, who had been the lessee since November 1951, bought the theatre and adjoining property. The following August he sold the freehold to Television Wales and the West, which sold it on to Charles Clore. In September 1962 it was confirmed that a new partnership between Clore and EMI was to control the theatre. At the same time plans for renovating the theatre were announced. For two years the theatre was more often closed than open. The Stage said that the theatre had "become rather shabby, possibly because success seemed to elude it for long periods, when it remained dark and neglected". King Kong, a South African musical, ran from February to October 1961, and there were what Mander and Mitchenson describe as "several uneventful productions" until Gentlemen Prefer Blondes opened in August 1962. It was still running (and moved to another theatre) when the Prince's closed for reconstruction in November 1962.

The name "the Prince's" was dropped and replaced by "the Shaftesbury". The new owners felt that the old name was too similar to those of two other West End theatres: there were the Prince of Wales and since 1962 a new Prince Charles theatre. The old Shaftesbury Theatre, further down Shaftesbury Avenue, had closed in 1941, reduced to a ruin during the Blitz, and the owners of the Prince's adopted its name for their theatre. The old raked stage was replaced with a horizontal one, and lighting equipment described as "the last word in modernity" was installed; the seating capacity of the renovated auditorium was 1,470.

As the Shaftesbury, the theatre reopened in March 1963 with the American musical How to Succeed in Business Without Really Trying which ran for 520 performances. A musical version of J. M. Barrie's The Admirable Crichton, called Our Man Crichton, with Kenneth More in the title role, played from December 1964 till June 1965.

The Shaftesbury reopened on 20 November 1965 with Twang!!, Lionel Bart's musical version of the Robin Hood story. The Times later described it as the most expensive flop in West End history to that date. The critic J. C. Trewin described the first night as "a rout" with "some fairly general booing". The show closed after 43 performances, after which the theatre was closed until October 1966, when success returned with a farce, Big Bad Mouse, originally written by Philip King and Falkland Cary, but extensively and successfully ad-libbed through by its stars, Eric Sykes and Jimmy Edwards – "two comedians abounding in their own exuberance" according to Trewin. It ran for 634 performances to April 1968.

Theatre censorship ended in Britain on 26 September 1968, and the following night the musical Hair opened at the Shaftesbury. Described as an "American Tribal Love-Rock Musical", the show contained profanity and scenes of nudity unthinkable until then. It had an exceptionally long run and was just short of its 2,000th performance when part of the theatre ceiling collapsed and the house had to be closed.

=== 1970s ===
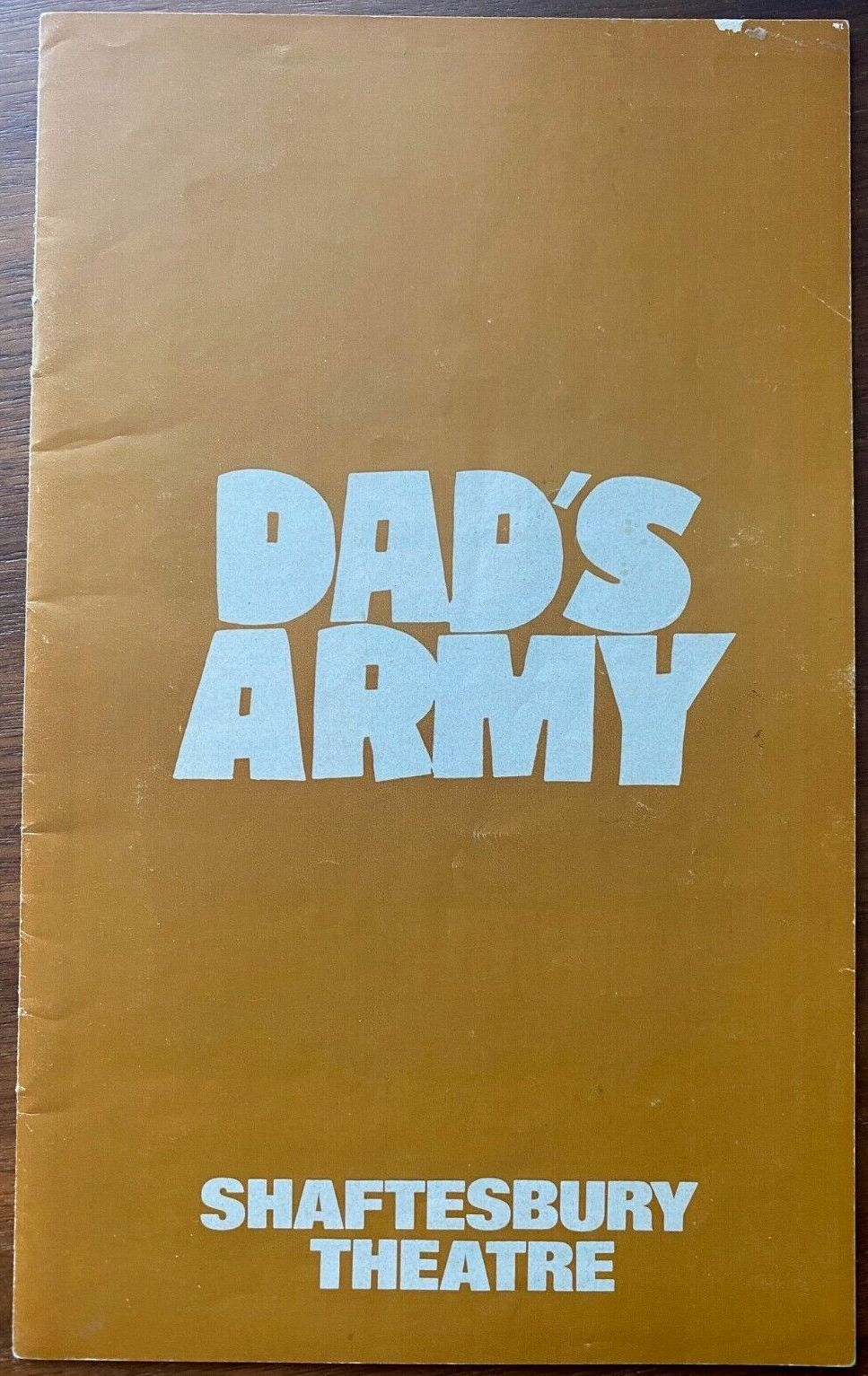
Shaftesbury Theatre programme, Dad's Army, 1975

In 1973 the theatre was at risk of demolition, faced by proposals by the Greater London Council for a massive road-building programme and by a plan to build an office block on the site. Nearly twenty years earlier a campaign to preserve the St James's Theatre from demolition and commercial redevelopment had failed, despite high-profile support led by Laurence Olivier and Vivien Leigh, but in the 1970s the campaign "Save London's Theatres" rescued the Shaftesbury (and other theatres). In March 1974 the theatre was protected by being given official grade II listed building status.

After the necessary internal repairs the theatre reopened with a well-received revival of West Side Story in December 1974. Other productions in the 1970s included a musical stage version of the BBC television series Dad's Army, starring Arthur Lowe, John Le Mesurier and Clive Dunn (October 1975 to February 1976). In September 1978 the theatre presented a revival of Hamilton Deane and John L. Balderston's 1920s dramatisation of Dracula, starring Terence Stamp, with scenic designs by Edward Gorey; it ran for three months.

=== 1980s ===
They're Playing Our Song (1980–1982) starring Tom Conti and Gemma Craven was produced by the actor and writer Ray Cooney. After the end of that run and a nine-month closure Cooney presented his farce, Run For Your Wife with Richard Briers, Bernard Cribbins and Bill Pertwee. This was the first play under the banner of the Theatre of Comedy, founded by Cooney, who said, "We have the finest comedy talents in the world in this country, both performers and writers, and I could never understand why we could not create our own theatre of comedy". The Theatre of Comedy became the lessee of the Shaftesbury, and later bought the building. The company was funded by a founding group of well-known actors and authors. (Note: Founder members of the Theatre of Comedy included the actresses Pauline Collins, Wendy Craig, Judi Dench, Liza Goddard, Sheila Hancock, Maureen Lipman and Julia McKenzie, the actors John Alderton, Richard Briers, George Cole, Tom Conti, Tom Courtenay, Bernard Cribbins, Jim Dale, Paul Eddington, Nigel Hawthorne, Derek Nimmo, Brian Rix, Donald Sinden and Eric Sykes, and the writers Benny Green, John Mortimer, Jack Rosenthal and Ted Willis.) The intention was for the Shaftesbury to have a programme of British comedy showcasing existing and new talent.

Substantial runs in the 1980s included Shaw's Pygmalion (1984) with Peter O'Toole, Jackie Smith-Wood and John Thaw; Two into One, another Cooney farce, starring Donald Sinden and Michael Williams, and described by The Stage as masterly (1984–1986); Saturday Night Live, a revue starring Rowan Atkinson (1986), of which the reviewer in The Stage wrote, "One leaves the theatre genuinely weak from laughter"; Osborne's The Entertainer starring Peter Bowles (1986); Sondheim's Follies with an all-star cast in a 645-performance run (1987–1989); (Note: The cast was headed by Diana Rigg, Julia McKenzie, Daniel Massey and David Healy, with Lynda Baron, Paul Bentley, Pearl Carr and Teddy Johnson, Maria Charles, Margaret Courtenay, Dolores Gray and Adele Leigh in supporting roles. During the run Millicent Martin and Eartha Kitt joined the cast.) and M. Butterfly starring Anthony Hopkins (1989).

=== 1990s ===
Sinden and Williams starred again in a Cooney farce, Out of Order, in 1990, which won the Olivier Award for best comedy in 1991. In 1992 the American television executive Donald L. Taffner, a shareholder in the Theatre of Comedy since 1986, became the majority shareholder and chairman of the company. Shows at the Shaftesbury in the 1990s included Kiss of the Spiderwoman (1992–93) with Chita Rivera, Brent Carver and Anthony Crivello, and Suzy Izzard in her show Definite Article (1995), of which the reviewer in The Stage wrote, "you will laugh, laugh again and continue laughing until you feel considerable physical pain. I did." A revival of Rodgers and Hammerstein's Carousel ran from September 1993 to March 1994, with choreography by Kenneth MacMillan; the sets, by Bob Crowley, were, in the view of The Times "the biggest star in Nicholas Hytner's lavish production".

In 1996–97 the theatre staged Tommy, a musical by Pete Townshend and Des McAnuff (1996–97), with Paul Keating in the title role. The production showcased the Shaftesbury's advanced technical facilities: The Stage called the production "a unique theatrical experience, with scenery that falls faultlessly into place, up, down and sideways ... superb lighting ... wonderfully balanced sound ... and immaculate projection". The musical itself was less well liked: in his Encyclopedia of the Musical Theatre (2001) Kurt Gänzl comments, "London gave it the thumbs down in 11 expensive months". From May 1998 to October 1999 the Shaftesbury was host to the musical Rent, which, following a recent fashion for musicals borrowing the plots of Puccini operas, drew on that of La bohème; it starred Anthony Rapp, Adam Pascal, Wilson Jermaine Heredia and Jesse L. Martin from the original Broadway cast. It was predicted that, reflecting the spirit of the 1990s as Hair had that of the 1960s, Rent might emulate the long run of the earlier show, and there was some disappointment that it ran for less than 18 months.

=== 2000s ===
A series of short-lived musicals was a feature of the first part of the decade. These included Lautrec by Charles Aznavour starring Hannah Waddingham (March to June 2000), Napoleon (September 2000 to February 2001), and Peggy Sue Got Married starring Ruthie Henshall (August to October 2001). Umoja: The Spirit of Togetherness was well received on opening in November 2001, but noise complaints from the inhabitants of the flats near the theatre resulted in the closure of the show three months later. Further short runs followed for Thoroughly Modern Millie (21 October 2003), starring Amanda Holden and Maureen Lipman; Bat Boy: The Musical (27 August 2004) by Keythe Farley, Brian Flemming and Laurence O'Keefe, starring Deven May; and The Far Pavilions (14 April 2005), starring Kulvinder Ghir; it was described by The Stage as "a galumphing great Asian white elephant of a musical".

They were followed by Daddy Cool (21 September 2006) by Frank Farian, starring Michelle Collins, Javine Hylton and Harvey Junior, and Fame: The Musical (4 May 2007) by Jacques Levy and Steve Margoshes, starring Ian Watkins and Natalie Casey of which The Times commented, "It really is difficult to find a kind word to say about Karen Bruce's production of this shockingly clumsy spin-off".

The theatre then had a long run with Hairspray: The Musical, which ran from 30 October 2007 to 28 March 2010. It was written by Marc Shaiman and Scott Wittman; the original cast starred Michael Ball, Leanne Jones, Mel Smith and Tracie Bennett. Later in the run Brian Conley and then Phill Jupitus succeeded Ball in the lead role.

=== 2010s ===
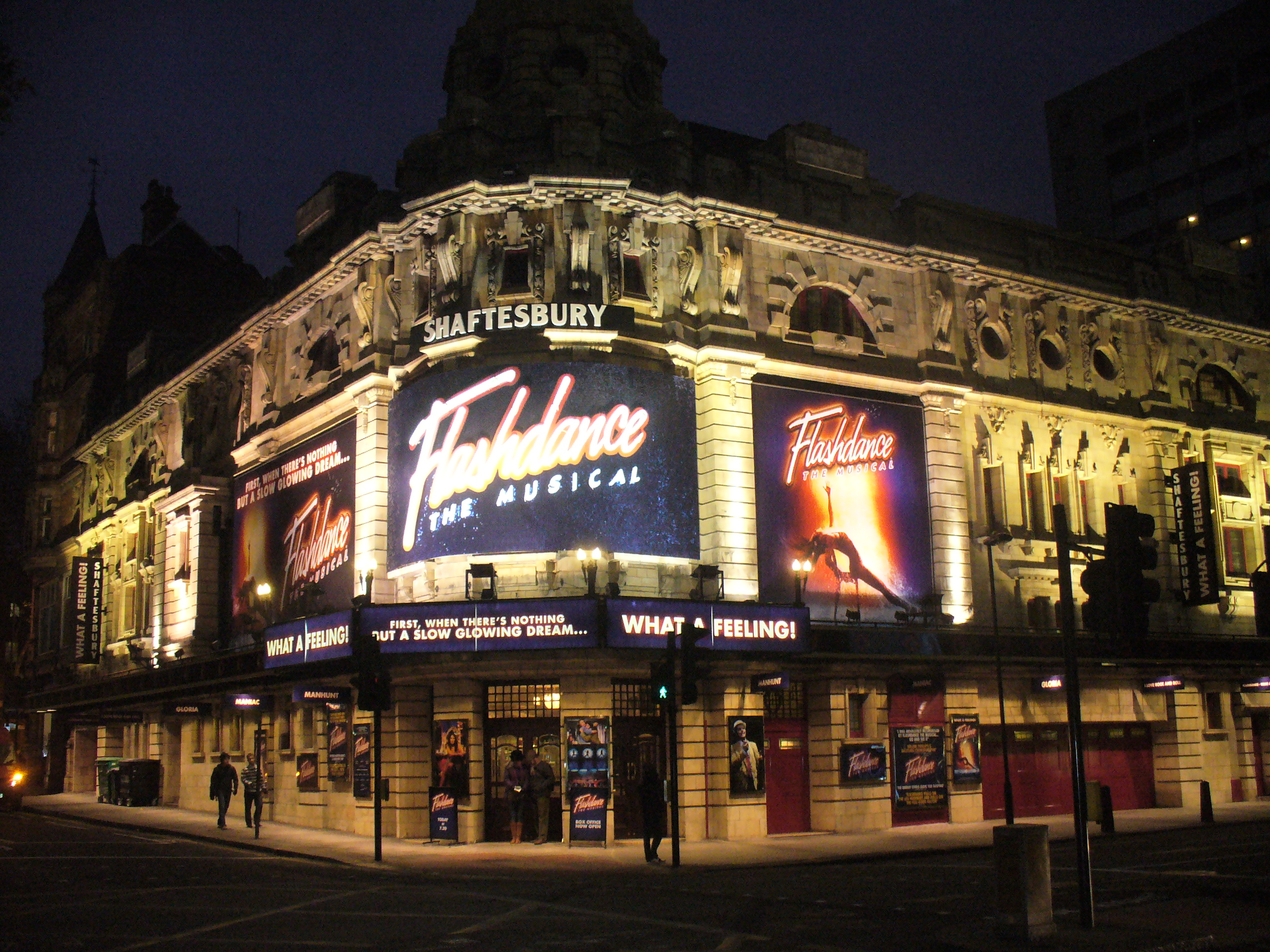
The theatre at night, 2010

During the decade the external façades of the theatre were renovated, and the original early-20th-century canopy was uncovered and restored. The auditorium was reconfigured, air conditioning and ventilation updates, and a fly tower with increased technical capability was constructed.

A dance production, Burn the Floor (21 July 2010), starring Ali Bastian, was followed by another musical, Flashdance (26 September). After that there was a magic show, Derren Brown – Svengali (8 June 2011). The theatre returned to musicals with Rock of Ages (27 September 2011); that was followed by a second run of Burn the Floor (6 March 2013), which was succeeded by a new musical by Tim Rice and Stuart Brayson, From Here to Eternity, (30 September 2013).

A revival of The Pajama Game (13 May 2014), which transferred from the Chichester Festival, was notable for being the first West End show to be crowd funded. It was followed by Memphis, starring Beverley Knight (22 October 2014); After a short season by a touring "magic spectacular" The Illusionists – Witness the Impossible (14 November 2015), Motown, presented the story of the Motown record label founder Berry Gordy (March 2016).

On 20 November 2019 a new musical & Juliet opened at the Shaftesbury. The run was interrupted when the COVID-19 pandemic forced West End theatres to close on 16 March 2020.

=== 2020s ===
The theatre reopened on 30 June 2021 with the musical Be More Chill, after which & Juliet resumed its interrupted run in September. Another American musical, Mrs Doubtfire, opened on 12 May 2023, with music and lyrics by Karey and Wayne Kirkpatrick and a book by Karey Kirkpatrick and John O'Farrell.

The theatre is scheduled to show the musical Avenue Q from March to August 2026.

From February 2027, the theatre will be renamed the "Judi Dench Theatre" in honour of Dame Judi Dench. The change will mark the first time a West End theatre has been named after an actress.
