= In the Summer of His Years (album) =

Compilation album by Connie Francis
- Released: December 1963
- Recorded: March 4, 1959; August 26 and 27, 1959; October 14, 1959; August 8 and 9, 1961; January 25 and 26, 1962; June 18, 1963; December 2, 1963
- Genre: Pop
- Labels: MGM; E-4210 (mono)/SE-4210 (stereo)
- Producer: Danny Davis

Connie Francis chronology
The Very Best Of Connie Francis – Connie's 15 Biggest Hits (1963)	In the Summer of His Years (1963)	Connie Francis sings German Favorites (1964)

Singles from In The Summer of His Years
- 1. "In the Summer of His Years"/ "My Buddy" Released: December 1963

In the Summer of His Years is a studio album recorded by American entertainer Connie Francis. It was released in 1963.

== Background ==
The album's title song was performed first by Millicent Martin when the BBC aired a tribute to John F. Kennedy after the tragic events in Dallas on November 22, 1963.

While Mahalia Jackson had recorded the song already on November 29, 1963, Connie Francis recorded her own version on December 2, 1963, followed by its immediate release. The arrangement was provided by Claus Ogerman who also conducted the recording.

The subsequent album of the same name was filled with material that had been released on previous singles and albums and was considered suitable to serve as memorial songs for John F. Kennedy as well as for J. D. Tippit, a policeman who had also been slain that day in Dallas. All the proceeds of the album were donated to Tippit's family.

== Chart performance ==
The album debuted on Billboard magazine's Top LP's chart in the issue dated February 1, 1964, peaking at No. 126 during a two-week run on the chart.

== Track listing ==
=== Side A ===
#	Title	Songwriter	Length	Previous release
1.	"In The Summer Of His Years"	Herb Kretzmer, David Lee	2:32	-
2.	"The Bells of St. Mary's"	A. Emmett Adams, Douglas Furber	2:30	MGM Records Album My Thanks To You (1959)
3.	"Too-ra-loo-ra-loo-ral (That's An Irish Lullaby)"	James Royce Shannon	2:13	MGM Records Album Connie Francis Sings Irish Favorites (1962)
4.	"The Lord's Prayer"	traditional	2:56	MGM Records Album Christmas in My Heart (1959)
5.	"My Buddy"	Walter Donaldson, Gus Kahn	2:51	MGM Records Album Greatest American Waltzes (1963)
6.	"God Bless America"	Irving Berlin	2:44	MGM Records Single K 12841 (1959)

=== Side B ===
#	Title	Songwriter	Length	Previous release
1.	"Ave Maria"	traditional, Charles Gounod, Johann Sebastian Bach	2:50	MGM Records Album Christmas In My Heart (1959)
2.	"Red River Valley"	traditional	1:58	MGM Records Album Connie Francis Sings Folk Song Favorites (1961)
3.	"Danny Boy"	Frederic Weatherly	3:25	MGM Records Album Connie Francis Sings Irish Favorites (1962)
4.	"True Love, True Love"	traditional	2:58	MGM Records Album Connie Francis Sings Folk Song Favorites (1961)
5.	"Every Night (When The Sun Goes In)"	traditional	3:19	MGM Records Album Connie Francis Sings Folk Song Favorites (1961)
6.	"Aura Lee"	W. W. Fosdick, George R. Poulton	2:10	MGM Records Album Connie Francis Sings Folk Song Favorites (1961)

== Charts ==
Chart (1964)	Peak position
US Billboard Top LPs	126
