= In the Summer of His Years =

In the Summer of His Years may refer to:

- In the Summer of His Years (album), a 1963 album by Connie Francis
- "In the Summer of His Years" (song), a 1963 song written by Herb Kretzmer and David Lee
- "In the Summer of His Years" (Bee Gees song), 1968
