= Sailor Beware =

Sailor Beware may refer to:

- Sailors, Beware!, a 1927 silent film starring Laurel and Hardy
- Sailor, Beware!, a 1933 Broadway play by Kenyon Nicholson and Charles Robinson
- Sailor Beware (1952 film), featuring Jerry Lewis and Dean Martin
- Sailor Beware! (play), a 1954 play by Philip King and Falkland Cary
- Sailor Beware! (1956 film), a British comedy starring Peggy Mount and Shirley Eaton, an adaptation of the 1954 play
