= Watch It, Sailor! =

1961 British film by Wolf Rilla

- British quad poster
- Directed by: Wolf Rilla; John Peverall (asst. dir.)
- Screenplay by: Falkland L. Cary; Philip King
- Based on: the play Watch It, Sailor! by Falkland Cary & Philip King
- Produced by: Maurice Cowan; Anthony Nelson-Keys; Michael Carreras
- Starring: Dennis Price; Liz Fraser; Irene Handl
- Cinematography: Arthur Grant; Len Harris
- Edited by: James Needs; Alfred Cox
- Music by: Douglas Gamley; John Hollingsworth
- Production companies: Maurice Cowan Productions (for) (as Cormorant); Hammer Film Productions
- Distributed by: Columbia Pictures Corporation/ BLC (UK)
- Release date: 14 August 1961 (UK)
- Running time: 89 minutes
- Country: United Kingdom
- Language: English

Watch it, Sailor! is a 1961 black-and-white British comedy film directed by Wolf Rilla for Hammer Films and starring Dennis Price, Liz Fraser and Irene Handl. The screenplay was by Falkland L. Cary and Philip King based on their 1960 play of the same name, a sequel to their earlier play, Sailor Beware, filmed in 1956. Bernard Robinson was Production Designer, Roy Ashton did Makeup, and Don Mingaye was the Art Director. The film was originally announced for Sydney Box Associates. It was shot at Hammer's Bray Studios in Berkshire.

Production ran from 24 January 1961 through 1 March 1961, and it was released in the UK on 14 August to little fanfare and disappointing reviews (which was odd since the play had been so successful). This would be Hammer's last attempt at a comedy for many years thereafter.

== Premise ==
Albert, a sailor, returns home to Britain to marry his fiancée. He is getting drunk at a bar rather than going to the ceremony. A drunk at the bar explains the horror of the mother-in-law syndrome. He eventually leaves with his sailor companion Carnoustie and gets in a car to go to the ceremony but the car (an Austin Six) breaks down. They run to the church but the vicar has postponed the wedding to do a funeral.

Everyone is waiting in the church. The bride Shirley chats with her mother. Meanwhile, her father Henry is latest of all and enters the pub which the sailors left and starts to get drunk.

Back at the bride's home the maid of honour, Daphne, says she is going back to the church to see Carnoustie. However a telegram is received from Lt Comm Hardcastle saying the wedding cannot proceed for legal reasons. Albert and Carnoustie are now at the church with the vicar and organist.

== Cast ==
- Dennis Price as Lt. Cmdr Hardcastle
- Liz Fraser as Daphne Pink
- Irene Handl as Edie Hornett, the bride's aunt
- Vera Day as Shirley Hornett
- Graham Stark as Carnoustie Bligh
- John Meillon as Albert Tufnell
- Marjorie Rhodes as Emma Hornett
- Cyril Smith as Henry Hornett
- Frankie Howerd as church organist
- Miriam Karlin as Mrs. Lack
- Arthur Howard as vicar
- Renée Houston as Mrs. Mottram
- Brian Reece as solicitor
- Bobby Howes as drunk
- Harry Locke as ticket collector
- William Mervyn as ship's captain
- Marianne Stone as woman with child
- Diane Aubrey as barmaid

== Critical reception ==
The Monthly Film Bulletin wrote: "The cast is crowded with guest stars and talented comedy actors, but slack direction and a flat-footed adaptation from the currently playing stage hit cramp everyone's style. In general it is a case of old jokes and character gimmicks, re-presented without a glimmer of wit or originality."

The Radio Times wrote, "A host of familiar British comedy talent fill out the cast including Irene Handl, Miriam Karlin and Frankie Howerd ... this is unexceptional, though some enjoyment can be found watching the old pros go through their paces."

Allmovie wrote, "the two great scene-stealers in this comedy of errors are Irene Handl as the bride's eccentric (okay, she's just plain dotty) aunt, whose ramblings have a surreal quality; and Dennis Price as the droll-witted officer who is forced by orders to interfere with the impending marriage, and then ordered to make it right. With the cock of an eye-brow or the slight curl of a lip, before he even utters a line, Price dominates every scene in which he appears, and even if the rest of the movie weren't as funny as it is, his performance would be worth the price of admission."
