= Our Man Crichton =

- Music: David Lee
- Lyrics: Herbert Kretzmer
- Book: Herbert Kretzmer
- Basis: The Admirable Crichton by J. M. Barrie
- Premiere: 22 December 1964: Shaftesbury Theatre, London

Our Man Crichton is a musical play based on The Admirable Crichton by J. M. Barrie, with book and lyrics by Herbert Kretzmer and music by David Lee. It opened in Manchester and then London at the end of 1964.

== Background ==
After a season at the Palace Theatre, Manchester the musical had its official premiere at London's Shaftesbury Theatre on December 22, 1964, where it ran for 208 performances. The cast featured Kenneth More, who had starred in the much admired 1957 film adaptation of Barrie's play, and Millicent Martin.

It was one of several musicals set in the Edwardian and Victorian era following the success of Oliver!. The female star, composer and lyricist all came from the satirical television series That Was the Week That Was.

More was approached to do the musical by Bernard Delfont. More wrote in his memoirs, "My first reaction was that I couldn't sing, but Bernard talked me into it." He was offered £1,000 a week plus ten percent of the gross.

More had three weeks of singing lessons. He felt that because of this "I could cope with the point numbers, which don’t require much of a voice, but simply a personality and a manner." However he struggled with a love ballad between himself and Patricia Lambert (Lady Mary) saying I was so terrible that I asked the producer to take it out of the show. It was essential for the action, however, so it had to remain. I got away with it on most nights, I think, but only just. Pat has a beautiful voice and she covered me so well that I would just come in now and then with a word or a line or a gesture."

== Reception ==
Reviews were mixed. But the musical still ran for six months. Historian Adrian Wright felt "the crux of the musical’s problem" was "Lady Mary, billed well below the title, was demoted to support Tweeny, now inflated to the star role. The trouble was compounded by the fact that the composer and lyricist wrote numbers designed for Martin rather than designed for the character she was playing."

Cameron Mackintosh thought highly of the musical's lyricism, and invited Herbert Kretzmer to write an English version of a French musical Les Misérables (by Alain Boublil and Claude-Michel Schönberg) which opened in 1984 and which is still running in the West End over forty years later.

== Cast recording and jazz improvisation ==
A cast recording, conducted by Burt Rhodes and produced by George Martin, was issued on Parlophone in March 1965. But Lee was also keen to record his compositions as pure jazz. Jazz Improvisations of Our Man Crichton came out in June 1965 on the Pye record label, with Lee on piano. "Even though the songs are predominantly Edwardian in concept the chord structures are designed for jazz improvisations" said Lee on the sleeve notes. Richard Morton Jack says the result "is light, and principally of interest for the fine solo work" - by soloists including Tubby Hayes, Ronnie Ross, Kenny Wheeler, Tommy Whittle and others. "Nothing about it suggests a stage musical, or indeed the Edwardian era, but it's a solid blowing session", says Jack.

== Songs ==
- Tweeny!
- Yes, Mr. Crichton
- Our Kind of People
- Down with the Barriers
- Were I as Good
- London, London ? My Home Town
- Let's Find an Island
- Doesn't Travel Broaden the Mind
- I Tries
- Yesterday's World
- Little Darlin'
- I Never Looked for You
- Oh! For a Husband, Oh! For a Man
- Nobody Showed Me How
- My Time Will Come

== Original casts ==
- Millicent Martin as Tweeny
- Kenneth More as Crichton
- George Benson as Henry, The Earl of Loam
- Patricia Lambert as Lady Mary
- Dilys Watling as Lady Agatha
- Anna Barry as Lady Catherine
- David Kernan as The Hon. Ernest Woolley
- Peter Honri as Reverend John Treherne
- Eunice Black as The Countess of Brocklehurst
- Glyn Worsnip as Lord Brocklehurst
