= Saturday's Millions =

1933 film directed by Edward Sedgwick

- Directed by: Edward Sedgwick
- Written by: Falkland Cary (story); Dale Van Every
- Produced by: Carl Laemmle Jr.
- Starring: Robert Young; Andy Devine; Leila Hyams; Johnny Mack Brown
- Cinematography: Charles J. Stumar
- Edited by: David Berg; Robert Carlisle; Daniel Mandell
- Production company: Universal Pictures
- Distributed by: Universal Pictures
- Release date: October 1, 1933
- Running time: 77 minutes
- Country: United States
- Language: English

Saturday's Millions is a 1933 American pre-Code sports drama film directed by Edward Sedgwick and starring Robert Young, Andy Devine, Leila Hyams and Johnny Mack Brown. It was produced and distributed by Universal Pictures. The film is an adaptation of a story by Falkland Cary that was published in serial form in a national magazine.

== Plot ==
Jim Fowler is Western University's football hero and is constantly besieged by reporters. Jim's father Ezra comes to visit him and becomes reacquainted with an old Western football chum, Mr. Chandler, who happens to be the father of Jim's girlfriend Joan. Jim keeps his roommate, Andy, busy by sending him to collect money on their laundry concessions business, even though Andy is desperately trying to meet his girlfriend Thelma, who has just come for a visit. When the coach tells Chandler and Fowler that Jim is nervous and erratic, Chandler invites Jim to spend the night before the big game at his home.

After-dinner conversation reveals that Jim sees football as merely a business, and feels devalued by his popularity because he thinks people are only interested in him because of football, not for who he is. Joan is disillusioned that Jim treats football as a racket, and the fathers are disappointed because they sincerely love the game.

== Cast ==
- Robert Young as Jim Fowler
- Andy Devine as Andy Jones
- Leila Hyams as Joan Chandler
- Johnny Mack Brown as Alan Barry
- Mary Carlisle as Thelma
- Grant Mitchell as Ezra Fowler

== See also ==
- List of American football films

== Bibliography ==
- Oriard, Michael. King Football: Sport and Spectacle in the Golden Age of Radio and Newsreels, Movies and Magazines, the Weekly and the Daily Press. University of North Carolina Press, 15 Dec 2005.
- Umphlett, Wiley Lee. The Movies Go to College: Hollywood and the World of the College-life Film. Fairleigh Dickinson University Press, 1984.
