= The Songs That Got Away =

Studio album by Sarah Brightman
- Released: November 1989
- Genre: Vocal
- Length: 49:52
- Label: Really Useful Group Ltd
- Producer: Andrew Lloyd Webber

Sarah Brightman chronology
The Trees They Grow So High (1988)	The Songs That Got Away (1989)	As I Came of Age (1990)

The Songs That Got Away is an album by English soprano Sarah Brightman. The songs selected for this album were allegedly based on an idea by Brightman's then husband Andrew Lloyd Webber. His idea was to incorporate songs which were mostly from West End theatre or Broadway theatre productions that were either unsuccessful, never made it across to the other side of the Atlantic Ocean, were cut from its respective show, or forgotten by time.

All songs were produced by Andrew Lloyd Webber with the exception of "Dreamers". It was produced by its original composer Marvin Hamlisch. Album liner notes were written by Sheridan Morley.

== Track listing ==
No.	Title	Writer(s)	Length
1.	"Meadowlark" (From The Baker's Wife)	Stephen Schwartz	5:09
2.	"I Am Going to Like It Here" (From Flower Drum Song)	Richard Rodgers, Oscar Hammerstein	3:34
3.	"I Remember" (From Evening Primrose)	Stephen Sondheim	3:05
4.	"Mr. Monotony" (Cut from movies Easter Parade, Miss Liberty and Call Me Madam)	Irving Berlin	3:59
5.	"Dreamers" (From Jean Seberg)	Marvin Hamlisch, Christopher Adler	2:53
6.	"Silent Heart" (From Bless the Bride)	Vivian Ellis, A. P. Herbert	3:56
7.	"Lud's Wedding" (From 1600 Pennsylvania Avenue)	Leonard Bernstein, Alan Jay Lerner	3:47
8.	"Three-Cornered Tune" (Early version of "Fugue for Tinhorns" from Guys and Dolls)	Frank Loesser	2:11
9.	"If I Ever Fall in Love Again" (From The Crooked Mile)	Peter Greenwell, Peter Wildeblood	3:57
10.	"What Makes Me Love Him?" (From The Apple Tree)	Jerrold Bock, Sheldon Harnick	2:41
11.	"Chi il bel sogno di Doretta" (From La Rondine)	Giacomo Puccini, Giuseppe Adami	2:47
12.	"Away from You" (From Rex)	Richard Rodgers, Sheldon Harnick	3:28
13.	"If Love Were All" (From Bitter Sweet)	Noël Coward	4:25
14.	"Half a Moment" (From By Jeeves)	Lloyd Webber, Alan Ayckbourn	3:56
Total length:			49:52

- Track 2, "I Am Going to Like It Here", was only on CD issues.

== Charts ==
Chart (1989)	Peak Position
UK Albums (Official Charts)	48
US Top Classical Albums (Billboard)	11
