= Big Bad Mouse =

1964 stage farce by Philip King

- Original 1967 London programme cover
- Written by: Phillip King and Falkland L. Carey
- Characters: Mr Price-Hargreaves (boss); Mr Bloome (assistant); Miss Spencer (secretary); Lady Chesapeake (company owner) + minor supporting cast of police detective, female victim and another secretary
- Original language: English
- Genre: Farce
- Setting: The offices of Chunkibix Ltd

Premiere
- Date premiered: 1964
- Place premiered: United Kingdom

Big Bad Mouse is a British stage play and theatrical comedic farce by Phillip King and Falkland L. Carey. Although not specifically written for Jimmy Edwards and Eric Sykes, it became a vehicle for the British comedy actors and has been revived many times with other stars right up to 2008.

Based on an original idea by Ivan Butler, Big Bad Mouse was first staged in 1964 but did not become a box office hit until Edwards and Sykes took over the lead roles and toured the show across the UK in 1966 and 1967. It was also a top attraction in London's West End for three years between 1967 and 1970. The anarchic pair brought their own talents to play and twisted the plot and dialogue out of all recognition.

No two shows were identical and it became an increasingly fluid experience, including audience participation and regular breaking of the 'fourth wall' between the stage and the audience. The role of the supporting cast quickly became one of trying to keep straight faces while steering the show on track and somewhere close to the original script, while the show's two stars generally played the fool.

== Plot ==
The action takes place in the sleepy factory office of the fictitious Chunkibix Ltd. The office is run by the domineering and pompous Mr Price-Hargreaves, whose assistant, the shy and downtrodden Mr Bloome, is under his thumb and generally treated badly.

This continues until a flasher and stalker chases a young woman across Wandsworth Common (changed to a prominent local park when the show toured); Bloome is accused of being the flasher by the victim and a police detective. Surprisingly (and distinctly dubiously by any standards of modern morality), the female workers in the office, to whom Bloome had previously been all but invisible, suddenly find him sexually interesting, and almost a hero figure.

Their flirtatious attentions have the effect of bolstering Bloome's ego; he quickly grows in confidence and stature, finally answering back to Price-Hargreaves, and even suggesting revolutionary improvements that greatly increase sales, thus drawing the attention of Chunkibix company owner, Lady Chesapeake.

So satisfying is Bloome's transformation and newly found confidence that when the young victim discovers she had made a mistake in identifying him incorrectly as her assailant, Bloome becomes increasingly desperate to keep her quiet.

== 1960s original tour ==
Edwards and Sykes knew each other well through several previous collaborations, including just completing the film The Plank, and were instantly comfortable with the format. With a fluid mixture of clever dialogue, quick fire jokes, sight gags, witty repartee backwards and forwards with the audience and even slapstick routines the pair ripped the original script to shreds. The rest of the cast struggled manfully to keep the play on track and constantly suffered light heartedly at the hands of the two main stars.

Jimmy Edwards played Price-Hargreaves in his trademark blustery harumphing way, that was easily recognised from his role as the headmaster in Whack-O!. Sykes played Bloome, the eponymous mouse of the show's title. Throughout the show the one ability that marked the boss's dominance in the office was his practised skill in picking up his phone handset by chopping with his hand, causing the handset to leap off the cradle into his waiting hand. Bloome, trying to emulate this, would always fail with the trick, either hurting his hand or sending the handset spinning into a waste paper basket. Only when he has gained confidence after being accused does he succeed, grinning widely at the audience.

At one point, during what is supposed to be a serious solo scene by Sykes, Edwards could be seen by the audience in his shirtsleeves and braces relaxing in the wings on an armchair. He is smoking a cigarette, flicking over pages of the play's script and making occasional wry faces at Sykes's performance, while Sykes feigns puzzlement at the audience's laughter. During the mid-play interval the cast joined the audience in the bar, remaining in character and performing several hilarious set piece conversations in between chatting with theatre goers.

The office secretary, Miss Spencer, who works for both men, starts the play as a shy drab and dowdily dressed spinster, but when Bloome gains his undeserved reputation and she herself is smitten by him, she also starts to blossom seemingly unnoticed. In the classic Sykes-Edwards production, the young actress playing the part endured endless ad-libs and delays in the action and still resolutely hit her cues and scripted lines. She became the stable point of reference around which the anarchic comics wove their magic. In the final act, having confessed her love for Bloome while wearing a drab ankle-length dress with a high lace collar, she next appears in a sexy red leather mini-skirt and boots, much to the delight of the audience who have appreciated her professional contribution to the performance.

== Shaftesbury Theatre run ==
After two years of highly successful touring all over the UK, it was decided in 1967 to commence a season in London's West End at the intimate Shaftesbury Theatre. Just before the run started, Eric Sykes was taken ill and hospitalised. At short notice, his part was taken by the multitalented Roy Castle, who stayed with the show for most of the three-times-extended three-year London run to sold-out houses.

Castle's additional skills as a musician, a singer and as a supple dancer brought an extra facet to the show, which by now bore little resemblance to the original script. Castle inserted a trumpet solo into the show while Edwards walked into the front stalls and sat, apparently bored, reading a newspaper. He later joined Castle on stage playing the euphonium in a musical duet. Castle also tap danced all over the stage, the set, the desks and a large leather armchair. Edwards had often stepped forward about three quarters through the show and announced sotto voce after another character's line "And that,… ladies and gentlemen,… is the last remaining line from the original script!" With Castle in the cast, it now prompted Edwards to additionally comment earlier in the performance, just after Castle's bespectacled first entrance: "The last actor (Sykes) was deaf…and now they have given me a blind one to work with". However, Castle was genuinely short-sighted, and the glasses he wore were his own prescription pair. When he later removed them, as the confident Bloome, Edwards commented to the audience "You do realise he can't see a damn thing now, don't you?"

With the play effectively finished, Edwards and Castle returned to the stage each night for an encore that often lasted for over an hour of jokes and routines, often 'attacking' the front stalls and private boxes with toy machine guns filled with table tennis balls. The audience in the expensive private boxes were usually the recipients of most of the more outrageous ribbing and leg-pulling during the show.

When the London show closed in 1970, Sykes returned to the role as Bloome, and it was taken on a repeat national tour of almost every theatre in the UK with the remainder of the original West End cast. For the next three years, the show also toured extensively across the Middle East and Australia.

== Later versions ==
Big Bad Mouse had a short run in New York City with an American cast during 1973.

Revived almost constantly for the last thirty years by both professional and amateur companies, the latest incarnation of the show featured the well-known British comedy duo of Tommy Cannon and Bobby Ball supported by Allo Allo’s Sue Hodge as Lady Chesapeake and newcomer Emily Trebicki as secretary Miss Spencer. The show opened in Hull during May 2008 and toured six other cities, before ending in August at the Theatre Royal, Windsor, to mixed reviews. Generally well accepted by the audiences and playing to packed houses, several regional theatre critics felt that Cannon and Ball did not possess the comedic depth and wider talents of the show's original 1960s stars. The Birmingham Post commented in June 2008:

"Cannon and Ball try to rework the same magic in this revival, with Bobby as the doormat and Tommy as his superior superior. However, despite their longevity as a double act, neither of them is as comically gifted as Sykes and Edwards…. As subtle as being hit over the head with a rubber mallet, this is really a way for the duo to extend their panto season into summer, and if audiences approach it with the same willingness to be amused as they do that, they probably will be."
