= Parnell Bradbury =

British writer and playwright (1904–1977)

Frederick Parnell Bradbury (19 January 1904 – 6 August 1977) was a British writer and playwright. He is known for co-writing Dark Lucy with Philip King. He was also a theatre critic for The Times.

Bradbury was born in Shepherd's Bush, London, to Frederick Stephen Bradbury, a dentist, and Kate Simmons Lynn.

Bradbury was a member of Sussex Playwrights.

He died at his home in Lydney, Gloucestershire in August 1977, aged 73.

== Bibliography ==
Bradbury also wrote under the pseudonym H. D. Bell.

- "The Plight of the Little Theatres". The Author and the Public: Problems of Communication (Report of the 28th International P.E.N. Congress. London 1956). Hutchinson. 1957.

=== Plays ===
- A Man of No Experience (one act)
- Calling all Kings : a collection of six one-act plays for children (1944)
- Dark Lucy (with Philip King)
- Off the Camden Road (three acts)
- The Judgement of Harris (1951)
- The Marzipan Prince
