= See How They Run (1955 film) =

British comedy by Leslie Arliss

- British trade ad
- Directed by: Leslie Arliss
- Written by: Leslie Arliss; Roy Miller; Val Valentine
- Based on: the play See How They Run by Philip King
- Produced by: Bill Luckwell; Derek Winn
- Starring: Ronald Shiner; Greta Gynt; James Haytor
- Cinematography: Kenneth Talbot
- Edited by: Sam Simmonds
- Music by: John Bath
- Production company: Winwell
- Distributed by: British Lion Films (UK)
- Release date: June 1955 (U.K.)
- Running time: 84 minutes
- Country: United Kingdom
- Language: English
- Box office: £123,586 (UK)

See How They Run is a 1955 British comedy film directed by Leslie Arliss and starring Ronald Shiner, Greta Gynt, James Hayter and Wilfrid Hyde-White. It was written by Arliss, Philip King, Roy Miller and Val Valentine, based on King's 1944 play of the same name. It was produced by Bill Luckwell and Derek Winn for Winwell.

== Plot ==
Cockney corporal Wally Winton desires promotion so that he can finally receive an inheritance. He dresses up as a priest and goes out one night with Penelope Toop, whose husband is a vicar. To add to the theme of mistaken identity, there are several priests running around, some real, some fake. One of these, Basher, is discovered by Winton to be an escaped convict, and is placed under arrest. The corporal is then promoted and becomes eligible for his inheritance.

== Cast ==
- Ronald Shiner as Wally Winton
- Greta Gynt as Penelope Toop
- James Hayter as Bishop of Lax
- Wilfrid Hyde-White as Brigadier Buskin
- Dora Bryan as Ida
- Richard Wattis as Reverend Lionel Toop
- Viola Lyel as Miss Skilton
- Charles Farrell as Basher
- Michael Brennan as Sergeant Major Towers
- Roddy Hughes as Reverend Arthur Humphrey
- Ballard Berkeley as Colonel Warrington

== Critical reception ==
The Monthly Film Bulletin wrote: "This screen adaptation of Philip King's popular stage farce feverishly exploits all the stock mechanics of low comedy without much success. The players do all that could be expected in the circumstances."

Kine Weekly wrote: "The picture sticks closely to a tried and tested formula and aims its sallies at those in authority and the inevitable scandal-mongering old maid. Ronald Shiner is inclined to force the pace and hug the limelight, yet scores quite a few laughs as Wally, Greta Gynt makes a radiant Penelope, and the host of other experienced and willing troupers improvise effectively in direct support."

Picturegoer wrote: "Slapstick farce that manages to raise some good laughs. The dialogue Is broad rather than witty and a quite distinguished cast struggles against odds."

Picture Show wrote: "Hearty and riotous farce which tells of the amusing situations that occur when Ronald Shiner, who portrays a soldier, visits an out-of-bounds country vicarage to renew friendship with a former show business partner. This slapstick film unfolds at a lively pace and the popular cast act with gusto."
