= Sailor Beware! (play) =

1954 comic play by Philip King and Falkland Cary

From the 1955 London production: left to right Peggy Mount, Ann Wilton, Myrette Morven, Jean Burgess and Sheila Shand Gibbs

Sailor Beware! is a comic play by Philip King and Falkland Cary. After a repertory company production in Worthing in 1954, it opened in the West End of London on 16 February 1955 and ran for 1,231 performances.

The play depicts the successful attempt by a young sailor to curb the tyrannical ways of his prospective mother-in-law. It was the first London appearance by Peggy Mount, who achieved immediate celebrity in the role of the domineering Mrs Hornett. The play spawned a film adaptation and a stage sequel, and has been revived on several occasions.

== History ==
The co-author, Philip King, had written an earlier hit comedy, See How They Run (1945), and had collaborated with Falkland Cary on five plays. Their Sailor Beware! was first produced by the Worthing repertory company in 1954. The cast included Peggy Mount and Richard Coleman, who retained their original roles when the play was presented at the Strand Theatre, London the following year. The success of the West End production established Coleman as "a reliable and good-looking juvenile lead", according to The Times, and Mount became what The Daily Mirror called "The toast of the town … the actress London is raving about". Tessie O'Shea replaced Mount towards the end of the run. The play ran at the Strand until 22 February 1958, a total of 1,231 performances.

== Plot ==
The Hornett household is dominated by Emma, the tyrannical wife of Henry, sister-in-law of Edie, and mother of Shirley. Able Seaman Albert Tufnell is in love with Shirley, but he views the prospect of marrying into her family with concern. He is an orphan and has never known home life. He decides to shock Mrs Hornett into recognising how badly she behaves to other people. By pretending to jilt Shirley on their wedding morning he sets off a chain of events that lead family, neighbours and even the vicar to tell Emma what they think of her. She is duly chastened and all ends happily, though not without a hint that Shirley has the potential to become as formidable a wife as her mother has been.

== Original London cast ==
- Edie Hornett – Ann Wilton
- Emma Hornett – Peggy Mount
- Mrs Lack – Myrette Morven
- Henry Hornettt – Cyril Smith
- Albert Tufnell, AB – Richard Coleman
- Carnoustie Bligh, AB – James Copeland
- Daphne Pink – Jean Burgess
- Shirley Hornett – Sheila Shand Gibbs
- The Rev Oliver Purefoy – Anthony Marlow

Source: The Times.

== Reception ==
The notices for the play were good, and those for the cast – particularly for Mount – still better. The Times called the comedy "simple but successful". In The Illustrated London News, J. C. Trewin predicted a long run, and commented that he laughed despite himself: "The farce may be preposterous [but] in its broad way it sweeps along the audience." In The Observer, Kenneth Tynan wrote that although the theme of the play was "as ancient as its development, whereby the husband-to-be jilts his bride", the authors' dialogue was "authentic suburban poetry". He said of Mount's performance, "She scorches the earth about her … The savage impatience of Miss Mount's acting must be seen to be believed". Tynan, Trewin and Philip Hope-Wallace in The Manchester Guardian all praised the other members of the cast, who in the words of the Times critic, "each contribute a nicely judged share to the comedy.

== Later versions ==
The play was adapted for the cinema under the same title in 1956, with Mount and Cyril Smith playing their original stage roles. A stage sequel, Watch It, Sailor!, opened in London in February 1960 and was well reviewed, although Kathleen Harrison as Emma was found less imposing than Mount had been in the original play. It ran until June 1961, and was filmed in the same year. Sailor Beware! became a staple of provincial repertory, and received a London revival at the Lyric Theatre, Hammersmith in 1991 with Jane Freeman as Emma and Colin Hurley as Albert. A 1992–93 tour of Britain starred Jane Freeman and Kathy Staff.
