= The Crooked Mile (musical) =

The Crooked Mile is an avant-garde musical set in Soho, London with music by Peter Greenwell and book and lyrics by Peter Wildeblood. It was based on Wildeblood's 1958 novel, West End People. The play premiered at the Cambridge Theatre, London, in 1959, directed by Kenneth Alwyn and starring Millicent Martin and Elisabeth Welch. The music was orchestrated by Gordon Langford.

The show ran for 164 performances, closing prematurely on 30 January 1960, despite continuing mainly positive reviews.

== The music ==
The cast recording was made in August 1959 and released on Top Rank UK JKP 2035 1959 EP

1. Crooked Mile
2. Someone Else's Baby
3. If I Ever Fall In Love Again
4. Lollybye
5. Down To Earth
6. Meet The Family
7. Luigi
- Sarah Brightman revived "If I Ever Fall in Love Again" on The Songs That Got Away.
