= In the Summer of His Years (song) =

1963 song by Herb Kretzmer and David Lee

Single by Millicent Martin
- B-side: "If I Can Help Somebody"
- Released: 1963
- Recorded: November 23, 1963
- Genre: Pop
- Label: ABC-Paramount Records A45-10514
- Songwriters: Herb Kretzmer, David Lee

"In the Summer of His Years"

Single by Connie Francis

from the album In The Summer of His Years
- B-side: "My Buddy"
- Released: 1963
- Recorded: December 2, 1963
- Genre: Pop
- Length: 2:32
- Label: MGM Records K 13203
- Songwriters: Herb Kretzmer, David Lee
- Producer: Danny David

Connie Francis singles chronology
"Whatever Happened To Rosemary" / "Your Other Love" (1963)	"In the Summer of His Years" / "My Buddy" (1963)	"Blue Winter" / "You Know You Don't Want Me" (1964)

"In the Summer of His Years"

Single by Mahalia Jackson
- B-side: "Song For My Brother"
- Released: 1963
- Recorded: November 29, 1963
- Genre: Pop
- Length: 2:49
- Label: Columbia Records 4-42946
- Songwriters: Herb Kretzmer, David Lee

"In the Summer of His Years" is a 1963 pop song with lyrics written by Herb Kretzmer and music by David Lee. Kretzmer and Lee composed the song as a tribute hours after learning that President John F. Kennedy had been assassinated on November 22, 1963 in Dallas, Texas.

"In the Summer of His Years" was first performed by English singer Millicent Martin, "with tears in her eyes", during a tribute broadcast to President Kennedy that aired on the BBC on November 23, 1963. The show on which the song was introduced was a special broadcast of the BBC's satirical weekly news programme That Was the Week That Was: after the news of the assassination broke, the producers of the show discarded the week's planned scripts and sketches and decided to refashion that week's show as a somber and respectful tribute to President Kennedy. NBC later rebroadcast the program. A soundtrack to the That Was the Week That Was broadcast was also released in the United States on Decca Records.

== Other versions ==
After the song was performed on the BBC, several other artists recorded and released the song as a single. Mahalia Jackson recorded the song on November 29, 1963 which was released by Columbia Records; Connie Francis recorded her own version on December 2, 1963, followed by its immediate release on MGM. The arrangement was provided by Claus Ogerman who also conducted the recording. Other artists to record the song included Kate Smith (for RCA Victor), Toni Arden (for Decca Records, Bobby Rydell, and Hettie Palance (for Palance Records).

Of the various versions of "In the Summer of His Years", only Francis' and Martin's recordings achieved enough sales action to chart on Billboard. Martin's single, released on the ABC-Paramount label, "Bubbled Under" the Hot 100 singles chart, peaking at No. 104, and Francis' version was nearly a Top 40 hit, peaking at No. 46 and No. 21 in Canada. On the Cash Box magazine Top 100 chart, the sales of Francis' and Martin's singles were combined, and the song peaked at No. 31.

However, no version of the song was granted a single release in the U.K., and in the United States, the song, even though recorded by major artists, was refused airplay by many major radio stations. An article in the December 14, 1963, issue of Billboard quoted station managers of several radio stations in New York and Chicago as saying they would not play the song because they felt it would be in "poor taste to capitalize on such a tragic situation". Other station managers said they stopped playing the song after initially playing Millicent Martin's version because of apparent lack of listener interest or because they simply thought the song itself was of poor quality.

All the proceeds of Francis' single and her subsequent album of the same name were donated to the family of J. D. Tippit, a policeman who was also fatally shot in Dallas on November 22, 1963. Francis' version of the song is considered one of the earliest charity records.
