= Goodness Gracious Me (song) =

1960 novelty hit song

Cover of the 1960 hit single

"Goodness Gracious Me" is a comedy song recorded by Peter Sellers and Sophia Loren. Released by Parlophone, it was a top 5 UK single in 1960. It features Sellers in the role of an Indian doctor and Loren as a patient who falls in love with him.

== Conception and composition ==
The song was conceived and instigated by George Martin, who was the producer for Peter Sellers's comedy recordings. Martin commissioned Dave Lee and Herbert Kretzmer to write the song. Martin himself produced the recording. Martin envisaged the song appearing in the soundtrack of the film The Millionairess, starring Sellers and Loren, which was being filmed at that time. However, the film's producers did not share his enthusiasm for including the song in the film's soundtrack and did not utilize it. The studio was however happy to see the song released as a stand-alone single to promote the film. In becoming a chart hit, it succeeded in publicizing the film.

== Release history ==
Though the song did not feature in The Millionairess itself, some of the lyrics in the song refer to the film; for example, "There's nothing the matter with it; put it away please", referring to the scene when Epifania shows Dr. Kabir her tongue, pretending to be ill.

It was released as a single in 1960, with "Grandpa's Grave" as its B-side.

The song proved so popular in the United Kingdom that a follow-up song, "Bangers and Mash", was released. Sellers sang and spoke the part of a Cockney asking for plain and simple English cooking, Loren singing the part of his Italian wife wanting to serve him traditional Italian food. Both are featured on collections of Sellers' comedy recordings.

== Later productions ==
In 1979, heart transplant pioneer Christiaan Barnard and Australian actress Chantal Contouri performed the song together as part of the Channel Seven Perth Telethon.

In the 1990s, the song provided the inspiration for the title and theme tune of the BBC radio and television comedy programme Goodness Gracious Me, starring British Indian characters.

In February 2013, the song was covered by Rowan Atkinson and Pixie Lott (joined by Nick Mohammed) for a one-off telethon, From the Heart.
