= The Trees They Grow So High (album) =

The Trees They Grow So High (Early One Morning)

Studio album by Sarah Brightman
- Released: 1988
- Genre: Folk
- Length: 52:53
- Label: EMI
- Producer: John Fraser

Sarah Brightman chronology
| The Trees They Grow So High (1988) | The Songs That Got Away (1989) |

The Trees They Grow So High (also Early One Morning) is the debut album of English soprano Sarah Brightman. It consists of European folk songs with arrangements by Benjamin Britten and accompanying piano by Geoffrey Parsons.

== Track listing ==
| No. | Title | Length |
|---|---|---|
| 1. | "Early One Morning" | 3:30 |
| 2. | "Come You Not from Newcastle?" | 1:26 |
| 3. | "Sweet Polly Oliver" | 2:53 |
| 4. | "The Trees They Grow So High" | 4:33 |
| 5. | "The Ash Grove" | 2:42 |
| 6. | "O Waly, Waly" | 4:43 |
| 7. | "How Sweet the Answer" | 2:12 |
| 8. | "The Plough Boy" | 2:02 |
| 9. | "Voici le Printemps" | 2:00 |
| 10. | "The Last Rose of Summer" | 4:33 |
| 11. | "La belle, est au jardin d'amour" | 3:34 |
| 12. | "Fileuse" | 2:04 |
| 13. | "Dear Harp of My Country!" | 2:33 |
| 14. | "Little Sir William" | 3:27 |
| 15. | "O Can Ye Sew Cushions?" | 2:36 |
| 16. | "Oft in the Stilly Night" | 2:48 |
| 17. | "Quand j'étais chez mon père" | 2:09 |
| 18. | "There's None to Soothe" | 2:09 |
| 19. | "Oliver Cromwell" | 0:51 |
| Total length: | | 52:53 |

== Chart performance ==
| Chart (2014) | Peak position |
|---|---|
| Japanese Albums (Oricon) | 135 |
