= See How They Run (play) =

1944 play by Philip King

- Poster for the 2006 West End revival
- Original language: English
- Written by: Philip King
- Genre: Farce
- Setting: Rural England, 1943

Premiere
- Date: 1944 (Peterborough); 4 January 1945 (West End)
- Place: United Kingdom

See How They Run is an English farcical comedy in three acts by Philip King. Its title is a line from the nursery rhyme "Three Blind Mice". In 1955, it was adapted as a film starring Ronald Shiner.

== Plot ==
The play is set in 1943 (or shortly after the end of World War II in a subsequent rewrite) in the living room of the vicarage at the fictitious village of Merton-cum-Middlewick (Note: This old British usage of 'cum', means 'alongside' in the middle of a village name, as in Chorlton-cum-Hardy.) (merging the actual village names Merton and Middlewick, both in Oxfordshire).

Penelope Toop, a former actress, is now the wife of the local vicar, the Reverend Lionel Toop. The Toops employ Ida, a Cockney maid. Miss Skillon, a starchy churchgoer, arrives by bicycle to gossip with the vicar and to complain about the latest 'outrages' Penelope has caused. The vicar then leaves for the night, and an old friend of Penelope's, Lance-Corporal Clive Winton, stops by on a quick visit. To dodge army regulations, he changes from his uniform into Lionel's second-best suit, complete with a clerical "dog collar", in order to attend a production of Private Lives (a Noël Coward play in which he and Penelope appeared together in their acting days), while pretending to be the visiting vicar Arthur Humphrey, who is due to preach the Sunday sermon the next day.

Just before they set out, Penelope and Clive re-enact a fight scene from Private Lives and accidentally knock Miss Skillon (who has come back unannounced) unconscious. Miss Skillon, wrongly thinking she's seen Lionel fighting with Penelope, gets drunk on a bottle of cooking sherry and Ida hides her in the broom cupboard. Then Lionel, returning, is knocked silly by a German spy on the run, who takes the vicar's clothes as a disguise. To add to the confusion, both Penelope's uncle, the Bishop of Lax, and the real Humphrey unexpectedly turn up early. Chaos quickly ensues, culminating in a cycle of running figures and mistaken identities.

In the end, a military policeman comes in search of the spy, finding four suspects, Lionel, Clive, Humphrey and the German, all dressed as clergymen. No one can determine the identity of the spy (or anyone else for that matter), but the German is eventually foiled by quick work from Clive and Ida. The situation calms down as the sergeant leads the spy away and Humphrey leaves. Emerging from the closet, Miss Skillon joins Lionel and the Bishop in demanding an explanation. Penelope and Clive begin to explain in two-part harmony, getting up to the scene from Private Lives, when Miss Skillon again manages to catch a blow in the face. She falls back into Ida's arms as the curtain falls.

== Early production history ==
Under King's original title, Moon Madness, the play went on tour from January to April 1943, with director Henry Edwards as Clive, Rene Ray as Penelope, Eric Cowley as the Bishop of Lax and Esma Cannon as Ida. An ENSA tour later that year, directed by King himself, adjusted the title to Harvest Moon Madness.

The following year, the play, as See How They Run, was presented by Jack de Leon at the Q Theatre, close to London's Kew Bridge, as a Christmas entertainment opening on 21 December 1944. Directed by Henry Kendall, the cast included Beryl Mason and George Gee as Penelope and Clive, with George Bishop as the Bishop and Joan Hickson as Ida. The production then transferred to the West End, opening at the Comedy Theatre to rave reviews on 4 January 1945. Hickson left the cast that same month and was replaced by the original Ida, Esma Cannon.

The West End opening night was not without perils. Three German 'doodle-bugs' (V-1 flying bombs) exploded nearby. The audience remained in their seats until after the play was over, but Gee complained at the cast party that all three bombs went off just as he was speaking his funniest lines.

The play ran for 18 months at the Comedy, notching up 589 performances and closing on 18 May 1946.

== Changes ==
- In the original, Clive is an English actor and former co-star of Penelope's, now conscripted into the British army; in a later rewrite, he's in the US Army.
- In the original, the prisoner is a German escapee from the local POW camp; in the rewrite, he's a captured Russian spy escaping from the nearby American base.
- In the original, Penelope speaks in RP British English; in the rewrite, she becomes an American.

== Quotes ==
- "The only other bishop's niece I know is in the chorus at the Windmill."
- "Darling, a woman with a bottom like that could say anything."
- "Sergeant, arrest most of these people."
- "How about The Wreck of the Hesperus?" "She's gone back to the cupboard."
- "You can't shoot me! I have diabetes!" (film version)

== Film ==
The play was made into a film in 1955, directed by Leslie Arliss and starring Ronald Shiner as Clive (renamed Wally), Greta Gynt as Penelope, James Hayter as the Bishop and Dora Bryan as Ida. Arliss collaborated on the screenplay with Philip King.

== Follow-ups ==
King subsequently revived several of his See How They Run characters in other plays. Pools Paradise (1960) includes Penelope and Lionel Toop, the Bishop of Lax, Ida, Miss Skillon and the Reverend Arthur Humphrey; the only other character is Willie Briggs, who is referred to but not seen in See How They Run. (The West End production of this play was directed by Henry Kendall, director of the first London production of See How They Run. As well as directing Pools Paradise, he also played the Bishop and cast Joan Sanderson as Miss Skillon again.) A later play, I'll Get My Man (1966), features both the Bishop of Lax and Reverend Arthur Humphrey. King himself played the Bishop in this play's Bristol Old Vic premiere.

== Major revivals ==
The first West End revival of See How They Run was produced by Michael Codron and staged by Alexander Doré at the Vaudeville Theatre in July 1964. A strong cast included Philip King himself as the Bishop of Lax and Joan Sanderson as Miss Skillon, the role she had played in the original West End production 20 years before. The revival ran for only a month, but a touring version of the same production, entirely recast except for King, was more successful.

The play was then revived by John David at the Greenwich Theatre on 30 November 1978, with Patricia Brake as Penelope and Andrew Robertson portraying the Reverend Arthur Humphrey as a Robertson Hare lookalike. This production played a busy Christmas and New Year season, closing in mid-January 1979.

In 1984, Ray Cooney directed a revival that opened at London's Shaftesbury Theatre on 8 February, presented by the Theatre of Comedy and running until 5 May. It featured Christopher Timothy (Clive Winton), Liza Goddard (Penelope Toop), Michael Denison (Bishop of Lax), Carol Hawkins (Ida), Maureen Lipman (Miss Skillon), Royce Mills (Reverend Lionel Toop), Peter Blake (The Intruder) and Bill Pertwee (Sgt Towers). The Reverend Arthur Humphrey was played by Derek Nimmo, who had played Lionel in the 1964 West End revival. A 90-minute Channel 4 adaptation of this production, directed by Cooney and Les Chatfield, was broadcast at Christmas 1984. In the meantime, Cooney's production had been revived in September 1984 for a further six-week run at the Shaftesbury Theatre; of several cast changes, Simon Williams took over as Clive Winton, Lionel Jeffries as the Bishop of Lax and, as Arthur Humphrey, John Alderton – who had played Clive in the 1964 tour.

The play was also revived in 2006, reaching the Duchess Theatre, London (26 June – 28 October 2006) following a national tour. The production was directed by Douglas Hodge and received excellent notices. 2008 saw a revival at the Royal Exchange Theatre, Manchester (15 December 2008 – 24 January 2009), then in 2014 the play was revived for a UK tour featuring short actors by Warwick Davis' Reduced Height Theatre Company.
