= Sailor Beware! (1956 film) =

British film by Gordon Parry

- DVD cover
- Directed by: Gordon Parry
- Written by: Falkland Cary; Philip King
- Based on: Sailor Beware! by Philip King; Falkland Cary
- Produced by: Jack Clayton; John Woolf
- Starring: Peggy Mount; Shirley Eaton; Ronald Lewis
- Cinematography: Douglas Slocombe
- Edited by: Stan Hawkes
- Music by: Lambert Williamson
- Production companies: Remus Films; Romulus Films
- Distributed by: Independent Film Distributors
- Release date: 4 September 1956
- Running time: 81 minutes
- Country: United Kingdom
- Language: English
- Box office: £221,779 (UK)

Sailor Beware! is a 1956 British comedy film directed by Gordon Parry and starring Peggy Mount, Shirley Eaton and Ronald Lewis. It was written by Philip King and Falkland Cary adapted from their 1955 stage play of the same name. It was released in the United States by Distributors Corporation of America in 1957 as Panic in the Parlor.

It follows the story of a sailor betrothed to be married, but wary that home-life may echo that of his parents: a hen-pecked husband and battle-axe mother. It is Michael Caine's film debut; he has a small, uncredited role as a sailor. Paul Eddington also makes his film debut, albeit uncredited.

== Plot ==
Royal Navy sailor Albert Tufnell is to marry Shirley Hornett the next day. He and his best man, fellow sailor Carnoustie Bligh, travel to the Hornett household.

However, Albert begins to have second thoughts when he spends the day with her family. He has no problem with her father, Henry, or with meek spinster, aunt Edie, but her domineering mother, Emma, is another matter entirely. (Meanwhile, Carnoustie and Shirley's beautiful cousin, Daphne Pink, are attracted to each other.) When Albert announces that he and Carnoustie are going to see their pals that night, Emma objects strenuously, as does Shirley, but they go anyway. Later, Emma sends Henry to fetch them, but it is they who have to bring back a thoroughly drunk Henry.

Edie lets slip plans for the couple to live in a house three doors away; plans made without consulting the bridegroom. Albert gives Shirley a chance to inform him, but she does not do so, which concerns him.

The day of the wedding, Albert does not appear at the church, so the Hornetts go home. Then, Albert shows up, as does the Reverend Purefoy, who was to preside over the ceremony. Albert states that he loves Shirley and wants to marry her. However, he has his doubts. Reverend Purefoy asks to speak to the couple privately. Everyone else leaves the room (but eavesdrops). Albert then explains that the unhappy example of her family life and the unilateral decision about where they were to live have made him hesitate. Henry comes in and surprisingly states that his wife has actually taken good care of him, and that he is fond of her. Upon hearing that, Emma breaks down and weeps; she tells Purefoy she wants to change her ways. Albert marries Shirley, but after they leave, Emma finds it hard to break old habits.

== Cast ==
- Peggy Mount as Emma Hornett
- Shirley Eaton as Shirley Hornett
- Ronald Lewis as Albert Tufnell
- Cyril Smith as Henry Hornett
- Esma Cannon as Edie Hornett
- Gordon Jackson as Carnoustie Bligh
- Geoffrey Keen as the Rev. Purefoy
- Joy Webster as Daphne Pink
- Thora Hird as Mrs. Lack
- Eliot Makeham as Uncle Brummell
- Fred Griffiths as taxi driver
- Edie Martin as little woman in church
- Margaret Moore as little girl
- Barbara Hicks as little girl's mother
- George Rose as waiter at Banfield's
- Frank Atkinson as chauffeur (uncredited)
- Alfie Bass as organist (uncredited)
- Richard Beynon as bearded sailor (uncredited)
- Douglas Blackwell as Co-op man (uncredited)
- Michael Caine as sailor (uncredited)
- Peter Collingwood as verger (uncredited)
- George A. Cooper as Petty Officer (uncredited)
- Paul Eddington as bearded sailor (uncredited)
- Jack MacGowran as Toddy (uncredited)
- Henry McGee as milkman (uncredited)
- Anthony Sagar as naval rating (uncredited)
- Johnny Briggs as naval rating (uncredited)

== Production ==
John Woolf bought the screen rights for $56,000. In late 1958 Woolf bought the rights to the sequel Hornet's Nest for $70,000 but it was not made. Shirley Eaton was borrowed from Alex Korda.

It was shot at Shepperton Studios with sets designed by the art director Norman G. Arnold.

== Reception ==
=== Box office ===
The film was one of the ten most popular films at the British box office in 1956.

=== Critical reception ===
Variety said it was "strictly for the domestic market."

Monthly Film Bulletin said "Based on the stage success, this domestic comedy provides reliable extrovert entertainment. It is efficiently and straight-forwardly mounted within the conventions of the filmed play, and the acting throughout is consistent. Peggy Mount, as Emma Hornett, gives a skilful performance, although its distinctly theatrical emphasis occasionally threatens to throw the film off balance."

Kine Weekly said "The picture is little more than a photographed stage play, but it nevertheless keeps on the move. Peggy Mount goes all out to repeat her theatre triumph as Mum, but her performance would have been more effective if she had shown some restraint. Ronald Lewis is, however, a likeable Albert, Shirley Eaton makes a winsome Shirley, Gordon Jackson and Joy Webster have their moments as Carnoustic and Daphne, and Cyril Smith and Esma Cannon furnish additional laughs as Pa and Aunt Edie. The supporting players also do their stuff and help to prevent the film from becoming a one-man show. Its time honoured cracks are securely linked by shrewd commentary on working class life and the climax registers."

Picturegoer wrote: "The film is just a grab-bag of old musi hall jokes, put over with plenty of punch. Some of it is really very funny. And Shirley Eaton and Ronald Lewis make a toothsome twosome. But there's a simply dreadful performance from Joy Webster, as the seductive bridesmaid."

Picture Show wrote: "'This is a mother-in-law joke which has added to its long stage run with a film version, and introduces us to a new star, Peggy Mount, who repeats her stage role and is brilliantly funny as she storms and rampages and nearly puts an end to her daughter's wedding by trying to run it. It is very good fun."

Leslie Halliwell said: "Plain but adequate film version of a successful lowbrow stage farce about an archetypal female dragon."

Filmink called it an "unfunny-now-but-not-then comedy."

In British Sound Films: The Studio Years 1928–1959 David Quinlan rated the film as "average", writing: "Broad farce from enormous stage hit, with rampaging central performance."

The Radio Times Guide to Films gave the film 2/5 stars, writing: "This politically incorrect comedy established Peggy Mount in the booming shrew persona that was to make her such a hit in television series such as George and the Dragon. Here she terrorises hubby Cyril Smith and prospective son-in-law Ronald Lewis on the eve of daughter Shirley Eaton's wedding. However, while Mount dominates the proceedings, the peerless Esma Cannon steals every scen."
