= Dave Lee (jazz musician) =

English jazz pianist (born 1926)

- Born: David Cyril Aarons; 12 August 1926 (age 100); Newington, London, England
- Genres: Jazz
- Occupations: Pianist, music arranger
- Instrument: Piano
- Years active: 1940–present
- Labels: Decca Records, EMI

Dave Lee (born David Cyril Aarons, 12 August 1926) is an English jazz pianist, and a former orchestra leader, music arranger, songwriter and film composer.

In a varied musical career, he wrote the hit song "Goodness Gracious Me", was the resident musician on That Was the Week That Was, wrote the score for the movie The Masque of the Red Death (1964), had a hit jazz album in the US, and was a resident fixture in early episodes of The Avengers. Later in life he was instrumental in founding 102.2 Jazz FM.

== Early life ==
David Lee was born in Newington, London on 12 August 1926 (not 1929 or 1930 as some references give). His father Joseph was a professional photographer, and during the war was transferred to the North East to work on camouflaging military equipment. The family relocated to Whitley Bay, and it was here that Dave started to perform in local groups.

== Career ==
Lee's big break came in 1942 when he won the Melody Maker poll for best new jazz pianist. Moving to South Africa in 1947 he worked as resident musician for night clubs in Port Elizabeth and Johannesburg, then studied at the Johannesburg Conservatory of Music gaining a Mus.Bac.

In 1954, Lee invited Johnny Dankworth to perform in South Africa, and it was Dankworth who persuaded him to return to England as pianist/arranger for the Johnny Dankworth Band. From 1955 to 1959, Lee played on all of the recordings made by the Johnny Dankworth Orchestra. Lee also performed with Terry and McGhee, the Buddy Tate Quartet and Jack Parnell. He also arranged for many big show business names, including Norman Wisdom, Benny Hill, Cleo Laine and Judy Garland. From 1959 he led the Dave Lee Trio who recorded several successful albums, including A Big New Band from Britain, which was in The Cashbox Top Ten for six weeks.

The Dave Lee Trio also produced music for the 1960s TV series The Avengers, for which John Dankworth had written the original theme music. The Trio feature particularly in the 1962 episodes "The Removal Men" (significant minutes of the episode are devoted to a complete jazz tune performed by the Trio) and "The Decapod". The Dave Lee Trio appeared in several episodes of Series 2 backing one of the lead characters, Venus Smith, who sang in a nightclub. Venus was usually unaware of what John Steed was actually involved in, and was phased out in favour of Cathy Gale.

Lee's composing career began in the 1950s writing jingles for television advertisements, some 700 in all, after which he teamed up with lyricist Herbert Kretzmer. Their hit songs included "Bangers and Mash" (1961, sung by Peter Sellers), "Goodness Gracious Me" (1960, for Sellers and Sophia Loren) and "Kinky Boots" (originally written for That Was The Week That Was in 1963, then recorded in 1964 by Honor Blackman and Patrick Macnee whom Lee had worked with in The Avengers and a novelty hit for them on a 1990 re-release). They also wrote the West End stage musical Our Man Crichton in 1964.

Lee worked on BBC satirical shows such as That Was the Week That Was (TW3; 1962–63), where he backed Millicent Martin singing different lyrics to the theme tune each week. He was also leader of the resident musicians known as Dave Lee & The Boys on the BBC radio comedy series I'm Sorry, I'll Read That Again (1964–73). A running gag on the show was to imply that the band were a lot older than their name implied: "and the music was played by Dave Lee & The Boys. (Boys??!?)" He won an award for "In the Summer of His Years", his composition for TW3 about the assassination of President Kennedy, to add to his Ivor Novello and BBC Jazz Musician of the Year awards.

Lee also wrote the theme tune to the 1963 TV series Take Four, a programme made by Associated-Rediffusion, and incidental music for the TV series Adam Adamant Lives! in 1966.

His film music career began in 1960 with low-budget features, but gradually he progressed to fine orchestral scores for feature films such as The Masque of the Red Death (1964) for Roger Corman. He also scored the movies The Kitchen (1961), Hair of the Dog (1962) and The Very Edge (1963). In 1983, Lee was elected BBC Jazz Society Musician of the Year, and in 1990 was one of the founders of jazz-only radio station 102.2 Jazz FM.

Still active in his 90s, his novel Nothing Rhymes with Silver about a fictional jazz pianist was published in 2007. 100th birthday celebrations are taking place in 2026.

== Discography ==
=== Albums ===
- 1957: Piano Moods – Dave Lee Trio & Lennie Felix Trio (Nixa Jazz Today Series 10" LP – Nixa NLP 1027) – (available to download from major music sites)
- 1960: A Big New Band from Britain – Dave Lee Orchestra (Top Rank RM336)
- 1961: Go Latin with Lee – Dave Lee with Geoff Love & His Orchestra (Top Rank International 35–112)
- 1965: Jazz improvisations of our man Crichton – Dave Lee & His Orchestra (Colpix PXL 550)

=== EPs ===
- Pieces of Eight: Piano Moods – Dave Lee Trio & Dennis Wilson Trio (Pye EP, PEP 603)

=== Singles ===
- 1963: "Take Four" – Dave Lee (Decca 45-F 11600)
