= Philip King (playwright) =

English playwright and actor (1904–1979)

Phillip King
- Born: 30 October 1904; Yorkshire, England, United Kingdom
- Died: 9 February 1979 (aged 74)
- Occupations: Playwright, dramatist, actor
- Years active: (1920-.c1975)

Philip King (30 October 1904 – 9 February 1979) was an English playwright and actor, born in Yorkshire. He is best known as the author of the farce See How They Run (1944). He lived in Brighton and many of his plays were first produced in nearby Worthing. He continued to act throughout his writing career, often appearing in his own plays.

== Biography ==
Philip King began his career on his sixteenth birthday as an actor with a small touring company in the North of England, graduating to the Repertory Company at the Opera House, Harrogate. There he subsequently directed plays and saw his first comedy Without the Prince professionally produced, and shortly after presented in the West End at the Whitehall Theatre on 8 April 1940.

King made several appearances on the London stage, playing with such well-known stars as Sid Field, Frances Day and Hugh Wakefield and despite his success as a writer he was still drawn to his first love of acting.

Of the events surrounding the West End first night of See How They Run, in January 1945, King wrote:

"At the time I was in the RAF and, luckily, stationed at the White City, Shepherd's Bush. During my four years service I had risen from the rank of AC2 (the lowest rank possible) to AC1 (not the highest), but I was fortunate inasmuch as, owing to the shortage of accommodation at White City, I was allowed to 'live out' in civilian digs. "By the grace of God the play went like a bomb - even three 'doodlebugs' dropped during the performance. George Gee, playing the leading part, swore that all three dropped as he was saying his funniest lines. No one left the theatre until the play was over. "The morning after the 'first night' I went down to Shepherd's Bush, bought every morning paper there was, and went to my usual workmen's cafe directly opposite RAF White City, and over a pint mug of tea and a Spam sandwich read the notices. "They were marvellous! But, as I read them, I suddenly remembered the pictures I had seen of Noel Coward sitting up in a wonderful looking bed, in an even more wonderful dressing-gown, a silver tray at his side, reading his notices! And here was I...a pint mug of tea and a thick Spam sandwich. But what the hell? I had a success. That's all that really mattered."

He was a keen member of Swanwick writers' summer school serving on the committee in 1973.

== Works ==
Dates are first publication, or first production if this is earlier.

=== Sole author ===
- Without The Prince; 1939
- Moon Madness (original title of See How They Run, 1943)
- See How They Run; 1944
- On Monday Next; 1949 (filmed as Curtain Up, 1952)
- Serious Charge; 1956
- Milk And Honey; 1959
- Pools Paradise; 1961
- As Black As She's Painted; 1962
- How Are You, Johnnie; 1962
- So Far ... No Further; 1968
- I'll Get My Man; 1966
- Go Bang Your Tambourine; 1970

=== Co-author ===
==== With Falkland Cary ====
- Crystal Clear (1941)
- Sailor Beware! (1955)
- The Dream House (1957)
- An Air For Murder (1958)
- Watch it, Sailor! (1960)
- Rock-A-Bye, Sailor! (1962)
- Big Bad Mouse (1964)
- Wife Required (date unknown)
- Housekeeper Wanted (date unknown)

==== With John Boland ====
- Murder In Company (1973)
- Who Says Murder (1975)
- Elementary, My Dear (1975)

==== With others ====
- Here We Come Gathering (with Anthony Armstrong, 1951)
- The Lonesome Road (with Robin Maugham, 1959)
- Dark Lucy (with Parnell Bradbury, 1971)

== Filmography ==
- Dumb Dora Discovers Tobacco, directed by Charles Hawtrey (1946)
- Curtain Up, directed by Ralph Smart (1952, based on the play On Monday Next)
- See How They Run, directed by Leslie Arliss (1955, based on the play See How They Run)
- Sailor Beware!, directed by Gordon Parry (1956, based on the play Sailor Beware!)
- Serious Charge, directed by Terence Young (1959, based on the play Serious Charge)
- Watch it, Sailor!, directed by Wolf Rilla (1961, based on the play Watch it, Sailor!)
- Sømænd og svigermødre, directed by Bent Christensen (Denmark, 1962, based on the play Sailor Beware!)
