= Millicent Martin =

English actress and singer (born 1934)

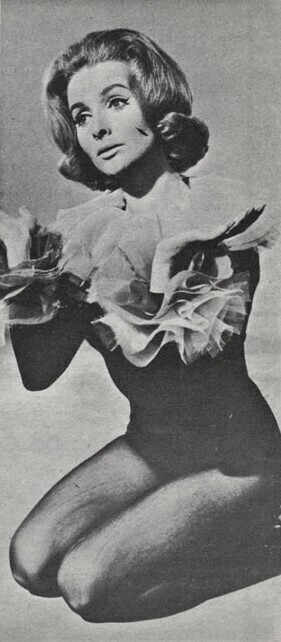
- Martin in 1966, performing in Stop the World – I Want to Get Off
- Born: Millicent Mary Lillian Martin; 8 June 1934 (age 92); Romford, Essex, England
- Occupations: Actress; singer; comedian
- Years active: 1954–present
- Spouses: Ronnie Carroll (m. 1959; div. 1965) Norman Eshley (m. 1969; div. 1973) Marc Alexander (m. 1978)

Millicent Mary Lillian Martin (born 8 June 1934) is an English actress, singer, and comedian. She was the singer of topical songs on the weekly BBC Television satirical show That Was the Week That Was (known as TW3; 1962–1963), and won a BAFTA TV Award in 1964. For her work on Broadway, she received Tony Award nominations for Side by Side by Sondheim (1977) and King of Hearts (1978), both for Best Featured Actress in a Musical. Other television roles include her recurring role as Gertrude Moon in the NBC sitcom Frasier (2000–04) and Joan Margaret in Grace & Frankie (2017–2022).

== Life and career ==
Martin was born in Romford, Essex.

=== Theatre ===
Early clippings show Martin as one of the cast in the pantomime Dick Whittington starring Jimmy Hanley at the Granada Tooting in December 1949. The following year she was in Aladdin at the Pavilion Bournemouth in December 1950 and in May 1951 she appeared in The Happiest Days of Your Life at the Playhouse, Oxford playing an "enterprising" pupil. December 1951, saw her in the pantomime "Mother Goose" at the Theatre Royal, Birmingham.

Martin attended the Italia Conti theatre school and not long after leaving the school, got a £9 a week part in the chorus as a Hotbox girl in Guys & Dolls before turning down the offer of second understudy to make her Broadway debut alongside Julie Andrews in The Boy Friend in September 1954 where she was earning £75 a week. She remained in the show until November 1955.

Martin's additional New York theatre credits include taking over as Dorothy Brock in the original Broadway production of 42nd Street in the 1980s and performing the revue Side by Side by Sondheim with Julia McKenzie and David Kernan in 1977, for which she was nominated for the Tony Award for Best Featured Actress in a Musical. She received a second Tony nomination for the musical King of Hearts (1978).

In London, Martin starred with Paul Scofield and James Kenney in Expresso Bongo at the Saville Theatre. In 1959, she had also appeared in The Crooked Mile. Also in West End, she starred opposite Jim Dale in The Card in 1975.

In 1988, Martin joined the London production of the Sondheim musical Follies, starring with Eartha Kitt.

In 2008, Martin appeared at the Open Air Theatre, Regent's Park with Topol, Linda Thorson and Lisa O'Hare in the Lerner & Lowe musical, Gigi.

=== Television ===
During the early 1960s, Martin was the resident singer of topical songs on the British weekly satire show That Was The Week That Was (1962–1963). The day after the assassination of President Kennedy, Martin sang the tribute song "In the Summer of His Years" on the show, which was composed by Herbert Kretzmer and David Lee just hours after the assassination. Her tribute was released as a single and 'bubbled under' the Billboard Hot 100 chart at No 104 in 1963 (but was outcharted by a cover version by Connie Francis, which reached No 46).

Martin won a BAFTA TV Award for Light Entertainment Personality in 1964. She has also released recordings in Swedish, such as the 7" single "Om du nånsin skulle ändra dej".

Martin had her own BBC television series between 1964 and 1966, titled Mainly Millicent for the first two series, and shortened to Millicent for the third and final series. For her work in this series she won the TV Society Award. In one episode, Martin and guest star Roger Moore performed a comedy skit in which Moore played secret agent James Bond some years before he was cast in the role. In the mid-1960s she guested, alongside Pete Murray and Kenneth Williams, in an edition of Juke Box Jury.

She appeared with Morecambe and Wise in their series "Two of a Kind" in the 1960s.

In 1969, Sir Lew Grade wanted to make a comedy film series, starring Martin, that would appeal to both American and British audiences. He sent six comedy sketches of Martin to producer Sheldon Leonard, who came up with the premise of From a Bird's Eye View. The series was not a success and was cancelled after 16 episodes had been filmed.

In 1977, on Jubilee Day, she appeared in a gala edition of BBC TV's The Good Old Days to celebrate the Queen's Silver Jubilee, performing in a double act with Julia McKenzie.

Martin appeared on $100,000 Pyramid in 1987 during the second week of the show's longest lasting tournament.

Martin appeared as Gladys Moon in 13 episodes of Moon and Son, a 1992 BBC detective series created by Robert Banks Stewart, and co-starring John Michie.

In 2005, she had a small part in the film Mrs. Palfrey at the Claremont which starred Joan Plowright.

Martin’s later television roles include Gertrude Moon, Daphne Moon's Mancunian mother, in the American sitcom Frasier. She has worked for the Disney Channel, starring in the shows The Suite Life of Zack & Cody, Jonas and in the film Return to Halloweentown. Other performances include guest roles in The Drew Carey Show, Will & Grace, Newhart and Days of Our Lives. She also had a small role on an episode of Gilmore Girls and a key role in an episode of Modern Family.

In 2011, she guest-starred opposite her former Frasier daughter, Jane Leeves, in the TV Land series Hot in Cleveland. She has also had an appearance in the fourth season of Chuck as the mother of Hartley Winterbottom, who was given the first Intersect prototype and became Alexei Volkoff; she also guest-starred on an episode of the fourth season of Castle as a theatre critic who wrote a harsh review of a performance given by Castle's mother.

From 2017 to 2022, she appeared in Grace and Frankie as Joan-Margaret.

=== Film ===
In the mid-1960s, Martin appeared in the British feature films Nothing But the Best (1964), Those Magnificent Men in Their Flying Machines (1965), Stop the World – I Want to Get Off (1966), and Alfie (1966).

== Personal life ==
Martin was married to the pop singer Ronnie Carroll from 1958 to 1965, and subsequently to actor Norman Eshley; both marriages ended in divorce. She has been married to American Marc Alexander since 1978, and became a permanent resident of the United States.

== Filmography and stage work ==
=== Film ===
Year	Title	Role	Notes
1959	Libel	Maisie	
1961	Invasion Quartet	Kay	
1962	The Girl on the Boat	Billie Bennett	
1964	Nothing but the Best	Ann Horton	
1965	Those Magnificent Men in Their Flying Machines	Air Hostess	
1966	Alfie	Siddie	
1966	Stop the World – I Want to Get Off	Evie / Anya / Ara	
2005	Mrs. Palfrey at the Claremont	Mrs. De Salis	
2017	Adventures of Old Man	Lucille	Short
2017	The Last Word	Margaret Dumont	

=== Stage ===
Year	Title	Role	Notes
1954	The Boy Friend	Nancy	
1958	Expresso Bongo	performer	
1959	The Crooked Mile	Cora	
1970	Tonight at 8:00	performer	
1973	The Card	performer	
1976	Side by Side by Sondheim	performer	Tony Award nomination: Best Featured Actress in a Musical
1978	King of Hearts	Madeleine	Tony Award nomination: Best Featured Actress in a Musical
1980	42nd Street	Dorothy Brock	
1987	Follies	Phyllis Rogers Stone	
1997	The Rivals	Mrs. Malaprop	
2002	What Ever Happened to Baby Jane?	Jane	
2008	Twice Upon A Time	Mrs. Clark	
2008	Gigi	Mamita	

=== Television ===
Year	Title	Role	Notes
1958	Theatre Night	Maisie King	"Expresso Bingo"
1960	International Detective	Katie O'Brien / Susan	"The Rose Bowl Case", "The Marlowe Case"
1961	The Horsemasters	Joan	Disney TV film
1964	Espionage	Susan	"Once a Spy"
1964	Drama 61-67	Jocelyn Willows	"The Happy Moorings"
1964	Kiss Me, Kate	Lois Lane	TV film
1970–71	From a Bird's Eye View	Millie Grover	Main role
1981	That Beryl Marston...!	Kay	"Live & Let Live"
1984	Glitter	Valerie Beaumont	"In Tennis, Love Means Nothing"
1986	Newhart	Sylvia	"Everybody Ought to Have a Maid"
1986–87	Downtown	Harriet Conover	Main role
1986–87	The $25,000 Pyramid	Herself	10 episodes aired October 6, 1986 to October 10, 1986 and March 16, 1987 to March 20, 1987
1987	L.A. Law	Arlene Sabrett	"Pigmalion"
1987	The $100,000 Pyramid	Herself	5 episodes aired April 27, 1987 to May 1, 1987
1988	Max Headroom	Cornelia Firth	"Baby Grobags"
1992	Moon and Son	Gladys Moon	Main role
1996	Coach	Tita	"Luther Get Your Gun"
1996	The Upper Hand	Dolly Hamp	"Nobody's Child"
1998–2001	Days of Our Lives	Lili Faversham	Regular role
1999	Stark Raving Mad	Katie Randall	"Fish Out of Water"
2000	That's Life	Carol	Recurring role (season 1)
2000–2004	Frasier	Gertrude Moon	Recurring role (seasons 7–11)
2001	Gilmore Girls	Debutante Presenter	Season 2 Episode 6
2004	The Drew Carey Show	Helen	"Passion of the Wick"
2005	Will & Grace	Leni	"Love Is in the Airplane"
2006	The Suite Life of Zack & Cody	Mrs. Delacourt	"Free Tippy"
2006	Return to Halloweentown	Prof. Persimmon Periwinkle	TV film
2009	Jonas	Her Majesty Queen Elizabeth	"Fashion Victim"
2011	Chuck	Mrs. Winterbottom	"Chuck Versus Agent X"
2011–2014	Hot in Cleveland	Agnes Bratford	"Hot for the Lawyer", "Tazed and Confused"
2012	Castle	Oona Marconi	"A Dance with Death"
2013	Modern Family	Charlotte	"Goodnight Gracie"
2013	Bones	Evelyn Schumacher	"The Cheat in the Retreat"
2016	2 Broke Girls	Gertrude	"And the Coming Out Party"
2017–2022	Grace and Frankie	Joan-Margaret	Guest role (seasons 3–4); Recurring role (seasons 5–7)
2018	Code Black	Marjorie	"Home Stays Home"
