= Herbert Kretzmer =

English journalist and lyricist (1925–2020)

Herbert Kretzmer OBE
- Born: 5 October 1925; Kroonstad, Union of South Africa
- Died: 14 October 2020 (aged 95); London, England
- Occupations: Journalist, lyricist
- Spouses: Elisabeth Margaret Wilson (m. 1961; div. 1973); Sybil Sever (m. 1988)
- Children: 2

Herbert Kretzmer (5 October 1925 – 14 October 2020) was a South African-born British journalist and lyricist. He was best known as the lyricist for the English-language musical adaptation of Les Misérables and for his collaboration with French singer and songwriter Charles Aznavour.

== Early life ==
Kretzmer was born in Kroonstad, South Africa on October 5, 1925. He was one of four sons of Lithuanian Jewish immigrants William and Tilly Kretzmer, who fled the pogroms of Tsarist Russia to settle in small-town South Africa early in the 20th century. His parents ran a furniture store. Kretzmer's oldest brother, Elliot, flew as part of a bomber crew in the South African Air Force during the Second World War, eventually becoming the Mayor of Johannesburg in 1991. Kretzmer matriculated at Kroonstad High School and then attended Rhodes University.

== Journalist ==
Kretzmer began his professional career writing documentary films and the commentary for a weekly cinema newsreel. However, he soon moved on to print journalism, initially as a reporter and feature writer for the Johannesburg Sunday Express. He subsequently relocated to London in 1954, and pursued twin careers as journalist and lyric writer.

After several years as a feature writer on the Daily Sketch, Kretzmer became a profile writer on the Sunday Dispatch in 1959 and the Daily Express, interviewing John Steinbeck, Truman Capote, Tennessee Williams, Sugar Ray Robinson, Louis Armstrong, Henry Miller, Cary Grant, and Duke Ellington. He became senior drama critic of the Daily Express in 1962. He held this post for 16 years, covering approximately 2,500 first nights during this time.

From 1979 to 1987, he wrote television criticism for the Daily Mail, winning two national press awards, including TV Critic Of The Year in 1980.

== Lyricist ==
Kretzmer won an Ivor Novello Award for the Peter Sellers and Sophia Loren comedy hit "Goodness Gracious Me", co-composed with David Lee. Other award-winning Kretzmer lyrics include the English translation of "Hier Encore" into "Yesterday When I Was Young" (which was a major hit in North America for Roy Clark), and the chart-topping “She”, both written with and for the French singer Charles Aznavour.

Kretzmer wrote the lyrics for Anthony Newley's musical film Can Hieronymus Merkin Ever Forget Mercy Humppe and Find True Happiness, whose score included "When You Gotta Go", often used as a closing song by singers including Barbra Streisand.

Kretzmer wrote the book and lyrics of the West End musical, Our Man Crichton, composed by David Lee and based on J M Barrie's satirical play The Admirable Crichton. The musical starred Kenneth More and Millicent Martin. Kretzmer later wrote (with composer Laurie Johnson) the lyrics for a large-scale comedy parody, The Four Musketeers, which ran for more than a year at the Theatre Royal, Drury Lane, starring Harry Secombe as the swordsman d'Artagnan.

Kretzmer's songs for Aznavour and Our Man Crichton came to the attention of producer Cameron Mackintosh in 1984. The latter thought highly of the musical's lyricism, and invited him to write an English version of a French musical Les Misérables (by Alain Boublil and Claude-Michel Schönberg). Kretzmer's lyrics extended the two-hour Paris original into a three-hour show. The all-sung "Les Mis" opened at the Barbican Theatre on 8 October 1985 and is still running in the West End, the longest-running West End musical. The score includes such well-covered ballads as "I Dreamed a Dream", "Bring Him Home", "On My Own", "Master of the House", and "Empty Chairs at Empty Tables". For his work on the Les Misérables lyrics, Kretzmer received Tony and Grammy awards. Kretzmer earned a total of approximately $20 million from Les Miserables royalties.

Kretzmer wrote the lyrics for Marguerite in 2008 from an original text by Alain Boublil. It was a musical set in Nazi-occupied Paris, to music by Michel Legrand. The show was part of a Jonathan Kent Season at the Haymarket Theatre before moving on to a season in Japan. Marguerite was shortlisted in the Best Musical category in the Evening Standard Drama Awards 2008.

Kretzmer's last musical project was Kristina, based on Vilhelm Moberg’s epic suite of novels about Swedish emigrants to Minnesota in the 19th century. The show, originally conceived and written by lyricist Björn Ulvaeus and composer Benny Andersson from ABBA, was presented and recorded in a concert version over two nights at Carnegie Hall, New York in September 2009.

== Honours ==
Kretzmer was appointed a Chevalier of the Ordre des Arts et des Lettres in 1988. He received the Jimmy Kennedy Award (a division of the Ivor Novello Awards) for services to songwriting. In 1996, he was elected an Honorary Doctor of Letters at Richmond College. Kretzmer received an Honorary Doctorate from Rhodes University in South Africa on 7 April 2011.

Kretzmer was appointed an Officer of the Order of the British Empire (OBE) in the 2011 New Year Honours for services to music.

He was nominated for Best Original Song at the 85th Academy Awards and the 70th Golden Globe Awards for the song "Suddenly" from the 2012 film version of Les Miserables.

== Personal life ==
Kretzmer married Elisabeth Margaret Wilson in 1961; the couple had one son (Matthew) and one daughter (Danielle). They divorced in 1973. His second marriage was to Sybil Sever in 1988. Kretzmer was an atheist.

Kretzmer suffered from Parkinson's disease. He died on 14 October 2020, at his home in London, nine days after his 95th birthday.
