= Falkland Cary =

Irish doctor and playwright (1897–1989)

Thomas Falkland Lucius Cary (2 January 1897 – 7 April 1989), known professionally as Falkland Cary or Falkland L. Cary, was an Irish playwright, best known for his collaborations with Philip King. He abandoned a successful career as a doctor to become a professional writer.

== Life and career ==
Cary was born in Kildare, Ireland, and educated at Aldenham School and Trinity College, Dublin. He trained as a doctor, and established a successful practice, first in Yorkshire and then in London. During his student days he developed a lifelong love of the theatre, and in 1946 he gave up his medical practice to concentrate on writing plays.

His theatre career started modestly. Only one of his first seven plays was staged in London. He sometimes wrote alone, or more often in collaboration, most frequently with Philip King. Their two most successful works were farcical comedies, Sailor Beware! (1954) and Big Bad Mouse (1966). In addition to his comedies, Cary wrote stage thrillers, and original works and adaptations for television and cinema. His plays were popular with amateur drama groups, and he made a substantial income in royalties from that quarter.

Cary died at the age of 92. He never married.
