= Toad of Toad Hall =

Play by A. A. Milne

Poster for a 2008 theatrical production of Toad of Toad Hall

Toad of Toad Hall is a play written by A. A. Milne – the first of several dramatisations of Kenneth Grahame's 1908 novel The Wind in the Willows – with incidental music by Harold Fraser-Simson. It was originally produced by William Armstrong at the Playhouse Theatre, Liverpool, on 21 December 1929. It was given in the West End the following year, and has been revived frequently by many theatrical companies.

== Background and first productions ==
For his stage version of Grahame's book, the humorist and playwright A. A. Milne concentrated on the adventures of Mr Toad, which make up about half of the original book, because they lent themselves most easily to being staged. He loved Grahame's book, which was one of the reasons why he decided to adapt it. He wrote in the introduction to the published play:

There are familiarities which we will allow only ourselves to take. Your hands and my hands are no cleaner than anybody else's hands, yet the sort of well-thumbed bread-and-butter which we prefer is that on which we have placed our own thumbs. It may be that to turn Mr Kenneth Grahame into a play is to leave unattractive finger-marks all over him, but I love his books so much that I cannot bear to think of anybody else disfiguring them. That is why I accepted a suggestion, which I should have refused in the case of any other book as too difficult for me, that I should dramatize The Wind in the Willows.

The first production was at the Playhouse Theatre, Liverpool, on 21 December 1929, under the direction of William Armstrong. The first London productions were at the Lyric Theatre on 17 December 1930 and the Savoy Theatre on 22 December 1931, directed by Frank Cellier.

=== Original casts ===
	Liverpool, 1929	Lyric, 1930	Savoy, 1931
Nurse	Mamie Hunt	Mona Jenkins	Mona Jenkins
Marigold	Katrina Kaufmann	Wendy Toye	Nova Pilbeam
The Mole	Alan Webb	Richard Goolden	Richard Goolden
The Water Rat	Lloyd Pearson	Ivor Barnard	A. Cameron Hall
Mr Badger	Wyndham Goldie	Eric Stanley	Eric Stanley
Toad	Leslie Kyle	Frederick Burtwell	Frederick Burtwell
Alfred	Peter Mather	R. Halliday Mason	R. Halliday Mason
Back Legs of Alfred	Martin Hyde	Frank Snell	Frank Snell
Chief Weasel	Nelson Welch	Ronald Alpe	Robert Hughes
Chief Stoat	John Guinness	William McGuigan	Leslie Stroud
Chief Ferret	John Robinson	Alfred Fairhurst	Neal Alston
First Field-Mouse	Sally Lockhart	Gordon Tucker	Jim Neal
Second Field-Mouse	Audrey Wilson	Robert Sinclair	Jim Soloman
Policeman	Herbert Bickerstaff	Alban Blakelock	Alban Blakelock
Gaoler	Basil Nairn	Alfred Fairhurst	Robert Hughes
Judge	James Harcourt	Alfred Clark	Tom Reynolds
Usher	Alfred Sangster	Humphrey Morton	Beeson King
Turkey	Lorraine Cromarty	Gordon Tucker	Jim Soloman
Duck	Trevor Reid	Robert Sinclair	Jim Neal
Phoebe	Joan Harker	Joan Harker	Wendy Toye
Washerwoman	Marjorie Fielding	Dorothy Fane	Dorothy Fane
Mama Rabbit	Elizabeth Ripley	Phyllis Coulthard	Phyllis Coulthard
Harold Rabbit	Doris Forrest	Marcus Haig	Jim Ned
Lucy Rabbit	Kathleen Boutcher	Daphne Allen	Daphne Allen
Barge-Woman	Pauline Lacey	Frances Waring	Muriel Johnston

Sources: The Stage (1929); The Era (1930); and playscript (1931).

== Synopsis ==
The play comprises a prologue, four acts and an epilogue:

- Prologue and Act 1

- Down by the Willows

The play is framed by scenes featuring two characters not in Grahame's book: a 12-year-old girl, Marigold, and her nurse, sitting near a river. Marigold tells her nurse about the riverbank animals, and the scene fades into the main action. Marigold and the nurse are not seen again until the epilogue of the play. Mole emerges from his underground home, and meets Rat and Badger for the first time. They are joined by Toad, who persuades Mole and Rat to join him on a holiday in his new horse-drawn caravan, pulled by the querulous horse Alfred. Unseen, the weasels, ferrets and stoats curse Toad, whom they hate. The caravan is in collision with a motor-car, and Toad becomes instantly obsessed with becoming a motorist. Mole and Rat lead him homewards.

- Act II

1. The Wild Wood

In deep snow, Toad, who has once again crashed his car (his eighth), walks fearfully through the wood, harried by the weasels and their allies. When he has gone, Mole stumbles on, lost, and is rescued by Rat, who has been looking for him. They find themselves at the entrance to Badger's house and ring the bell.

2. Badger's House

Safely inside Badger's underground house, Mole and Rat refresh themselves, and discuss with Badger the excesses Toad has been committing, squandering his fortune on expensive cars and crashing them. Toad now finds Badger's house, and seeks refuge. Badger lectures him about his foolish ways, but Toad is unrepentant. Badger says that Toad must stay with him until his motor-mania has worn off, and Toad is locked into the guest-bedroom.

3. The Same. Some Weeks Later

In the absence of Badger and Mole, Toad tricks Rat into letting him escape from his confinement at Badger's house and he flees, singing a gleeful and boastful song to himself.

- Act III

1. The Court-House

Toad is on trial for stealing a motor-car, driving recklessly, and, most seriously, being grossly impertinent to a police officer. He is found guilty and sentenced to 20 years' imprisonment.

2. The Dungeon

Phoebe, the jailer's daughter, takes pity on Toad, and helps him escape by disguising him as a washerwoman.

3. The Canal Bank

Toad shakes off the pursuing forces of law and order, and hitches a ride on a canal barge. He quarrels with the barge-woman, steals her horse and rides off.

- Act IV

1. Rat's House by the River

Toad makes his way to Rat's house, where he learns to his horror that his grand residence, Toad Hall, has been occupied by the weasels, ferrets and stoats. When Mole and Badger enter, the four discuss how to drive the occupiers out.

2. The Underground Passage

In a secret underground passage the four friends prepare to enter Toad Hall and catch the occupiers unawares.

3. The Banqueting-Room at Toad Hall

The Chief Weasel's birthday party is in progress. Badger leads the attack and the enemy is quickly routed. Toad sings a song about his homecoming and gradually the other characters of the play – including the weasels, Mole, Rat, the judge, Alfred, the barge-woman, Phoebe, and last of all Badger – join in dancing in a circle round the triumphant Toad.

- Epilogue

The Wind in the Willows

The scene at Toad Hall fades away and the setting is as it was for the prologue. Marigold is asleep; a badger, a water-rat, a mole and finally a toad pass the slumbering child, before the nurse tells her it is time to wake up and come home.

== Music ==
Although not a musical, the play contains ten musical numbers composed by Harold Fraser-Simson:

1. "Down by the Willows" (introductory music)
2. Thunderstorm, war-song, dance and chorus, "Toad, Toad, Down with Toad!"
3. Mole's song, "'I Have Noticed Before', Said the Wise Mr. Rat"
4. Carol-singers' chorus, "Joy Shall Be Yours in the Morning"
5. Rat's song, "Duck's Ditty"

6. Toad's first song, "The World Has Held Great Heroes"
7. The Judge's song, "If an Animal Errs or a Citizen Sins"
8. Quartet, "When Night Comes on and the Owls Are Hooting
9. Weasel's song: "Toad He Went A-Pleasuring Gaily Down the Road"
10. Toad's second song, "The Toad Came Home".

== Critical response ==
Reviewing the Liverpool premiere, The Stage commented that Milne had succeeded brilliantly in putting Grahame's characters on the stage, but thought the play might be over the heads of a children's audience, having "so much in it to appeal to the adult mind". The other principal theatrical paper, The Era, thought that there might be "a certain amount of doubt whether Mr Milne has succeeded in bringing the peculiar and indefinable atmosphere of Kenneth Grahame's little classic in the realms of fantasy, The Wind in the Willows, on to the stage. But perhaps he never attempted to do so. What he has actually done has been to provide an entertainment brimful of delight, for childish hearts".

== Revivals ==
The play was revived in the West End each year from 1932 to 1935, and was next seen there in 1954, in a production first seen at the Royal Shakespeare Theatre, Stratford-upon-Avon, with Leo McKern as Toad, William Squire as Rat, Edward Atienza as Mole and Brewster Mason as Badger.

In the 1960s and 1970s there were annual West End revivals during the Christmas season, with Goolden returning to the part of Mole in every year except one. Among the actors appearing in the play in London and elsewhere were, in the title role Michael Bates, Hywel Bennett, Derek Godfrey, Nicky Henson, Michael Hordern, Paul Scofield, Ian Wallace, Michael Williams, Peter Woodthorpe and Patrick Wymark. Alan Badel and Clive Revill were among those seen as Rat; Badgers included Michael Blakemore, Mark Dignam, John Justin and John Woodvine. Performers seen in other roles in the play included Beverley Cross, Judi Dench, Ian McKellen, Rita Tushingham and Brett Usher. In the 1980s and subsequently the play has been frequently revived in London, the British provinces and in North America.

== Adaptations ==
The BBC has broadcast several adaptations of the play. A 1942 radio version featured Goolden and Burtwell reprising their roles from the first London production, Fred Yule was Badger and Vernon Harris was Rat. Michael Barry's television version of Toad of Toad Hall was broadcast live on eight occasions between 1946 and 1950 with varying casts, the only principal common to all eight being Kenneth More as Badger. A 1953 television version featured Gerald Campion as Toad and Patrick Troughton as Badger.

A serialised radio adaptation of the play was broadcast on Children's Hour in 1948; Norman Shelley played Toad, Goolden was Mole and Leslie French Rat. A 1973 radio version featured Goolden with Derek Smith as Toad, Bernard Cribbins as Rat, Cyril Luckham as Badger and Hugh Paddick as the Judge. This version was broadcast again in 1973, 1976, 1979, 1981 and 1990.

== References and sources ==
=== Sources ===
- Herbert, Ian, ed. (1977). Who's Who in the Theatre (sixteenth ed.). London and Detroit: Pitman Publishing and Gale Research. ISBN 978-0-273-00163-8.
- Milne, A. A. (1932). Toad of Toad Hall. London: Samuel French. OCLC 772896476.
- Milne, A. A. (1946). Toad of Toad Hall. London: Methuen. OCLC 963200557.
- Trewin, J. C. (1956). Paul Scofield: An illustrated study of his work. London: Rockliff. OCLC 1150965542.
