= In Praise of Love (play) =

Play written by Terence Rattigan

Cover of playbill for original Broadway production with Rex Harrison & Julie Harris, 1974

In Praise of Love, originally entitled After Lydia, is the first part of a 1973 double-bill play by the English playwright Terence Rattigan (the second half being Before Dawn, a burlesque of the opera Tosca). It was the penultimate play he wrote.

The play's action was loosely inspired by the relationship between the actor Rex Harrison and his actress wife Kay Kendall. In the play, the couple are transformed into the egotistical left-wing literary critic Sebastian and his East European refugee wife Lydia. During the Second World War, some 30 years previously, Sebastian had served in military intelligence while the part-Jewish Lydia was with the Resistance and then survived on her wits and her feminine charms; each is shown using the aptitude for deception developed then to try to protect the other from the knowledge that Lydia is suffering from a terminal illness. Rounding out the cast are Mark, a best-selling popular novelist and a friend of Sebastian's, who has long carried a torch for Lydia, and Joey, the couple's 20-year-old son, himself an aspiring writer, who is in rebellion against his father's overbearing manner and professed Marxist views.

The plays were described by Rattigan's biographer Michael Darlow in the following terms:

While on the surface the play takes the form of a comedy of misunderstanding, it quickly builds into a situation of almost unbearable suspense as layer after layer of comedy and pretence is peeled away from each character to reveal the full measure of each one's unspoken love and pain. As well as being an outstanding dissection of the nature of love and pain, In Praise of Love is as fine a statement about the loss of idealism and illusions in the 1970s as any play by any of the younger British dramatists of the period. The second play in the double bill was Before Dawn, a crude burlesque of Tosca. In contrast to the first play, in this love is talked about too much but not felt. In Praise of Love is a small masterpiece. Before Dawn is unaccountably feeble.

== Original productions ==
The original London production, at the Duchess Theatre, was directed by John Dexter, and starred Donald Sinden as Sebastian and Joan Greenwood as Lydia. It ran for 131 performances, and was described by The Sunday Times critic as “the most piercing exposition of love under great stress that I have ever seen on the stage.”

- Lydia Cruttwell - Joan Greenwood
- Sebastian Cruttwell - Donald Sinden
- Mark Walters - Don Fellows
- Joey Cruttwell - Richard Warwick

The subsequent New York production, directed by Fred Coe, which dropped the much-panned 2nd-act play Before Dawn, starred Rex Harrison in the role based on himself (Sebastian) and Julie Harris as Lydia. Rattigan was said to be "intensely disappointed and frustrated" by Harrison's performance, as "Harrison refused to play the outwardly boorish parts of the character and instead played him as charming throughout, signalling to the audience from the start that he knew the truth about Lydia's illness." Critics however were quite pleased with the actor's work, which was yet another of Harrison's well plotted naturalistic performances. The play ran for a respectable, if not outstanding, 199 performances.

- Lydia Cruttwell - Julie Harris
- Sebastian Cruttwell - Rex Harrison
- Mark Walters - Martin Gabel
- Joey Cruttwell - Peter Burnell

== Adaptations & revivals ==
In 1976, the play was filmed to great acclaim, with Alvin Rakoff directing for Anglia Television, and with Kenneth More and Claire Bloom in the lead roles. It was revived at the Chichester Festival Theatre in 2006 and at the Royal and Derngate Theatres, Northampton in 2011. It was broadcast as a Radio drama on BBC Radio 4 the same year. It has become a staple of repertory theatre seasons since. It was revived at the Orange Tree Theatre, Richmond, in summer 2025.
