= Morning Call (film) =

1957 British film by Arthur Crabtree

- U.S. theatrical release poster
- Directed by: Arthur Crabtree
- Written by: Bill Luckwell; Paul Tabori
- Story by: Leo Townsend
- Produced by: John Bash
- Starring: Greta Gynt; Ron Randell
- Cinematography: Walter J. Harvey
- Music by: John Bath
- Production company: Winwell
- Distributed by: Republic Pictures (US)
- Release date: 1957
- Running time: 75 minutes
- Country: United Kingdom
- Language: English

Morning Call (U.S. title: The Strange Case of Dr. Manning) is a 1957 British thriller film, directed by Arthur Crabtree and starring Greta Gynt and Ron Randell. It was written by Bill Luckwell and Paul Tabori from a story by Leo Townsend. It was distributed in the U.S. by Republic Pictures.

== Plot ==
The rich and successful Dr. Manning is called out in the middle of the night to visit a private patient. He never returns and the next morning his wife Annette finds him missing. Soon after, she receives a ransom note demanding £5,000 for his release. The police are alerted and soon Annette is trying to deliver the money to various drop-off points specified by the kidnapper in telephone calls to her. The police keep watch, hoping to catch the kidnapper in the act of retrieving the money, but he fails to show up, realising the locations are being watched. Annette hires a private detective, Nick Logan, to make his own investigations.

Manning is found dead, and the police decide to use Annette as bait to catch his killer. They publicise that she has heard his voice in the phone calls and will be able to identify it if she hears it again, hoping that the threat will flush him out in order to try to get her out of the way. Logan and the police finally succeed in cornering the killer, and a surprising personal motive for his actions is discovered.

== Cast ==
- Greta Gynt as Annette Manning
- Ron Randell as Nick Logan
- Garard Green as Gil Stevens
- Bruce Seton as Inspector Brown
- Peter Fontaine as Fred Barnes
- Virginia Keiley as Vera Clark
- Robert Raglan as plainclothesman
- John Watson as plainclothesman
- Brian Sunners as Freddie
- Wally Patch as Wally
- David Lander as Dr. George Manning
- Charles Farrell as John Karver
- Christopher Cooke as Gypsy boy
- Fred Griffiths as taxi driver (uncredited)

== Production ==
The film was originally cast with George Raft and Bella Darvi as the leads, but Raft reportedly pulled out, citing dissatisfaction with the script. The producers claimed that Raft was insistent on his character having a romantic involvement with the leading lady, which they could not accept as they felt it would unbalance the plot and be seen as incongruous by audiences. For undisclosed reasons, they also decided to let Darvi go.

== Reception ==
The Monthly Film Bulletin wrote: "It is rare to find a melodrama at once so conventional and so unconvincing as this British second feature."

Kine Weekly wrote: "The picture covers a fair amount of ground, but although tension is created towards the finish, it lacks sharpness. Ron Randell and Bruce Seton register as Nick and Inspector Brown, and the ubiquitous Peter Noble pops up a TV announcer, but Greta Gynt falls short of emotional demands as Annette, and its subsidiary characters are loosely etched. The dialogue too leaves something to be desired, but it staging is adequate."

In British Sound Films: The Studio Years 1928–1959 David Quinlan rated the film as "poor", writing: "Inept thriller, barely released."
