= From Ragtime to Rock 'n' Roll =

Music documentary

Ragtime to Rock 'n' Roll is a BBC Radio 2 documentary chronicling the trends in popular music in the US and UK from 1900-1970. Narrated by Kenneth More, the 51-volume 26-* Part documentary debuted in 1974.

== Episode list ==
- Part 01 Dawn of a New Age 1900–1902
- Part 02 Let the Good Times Roll 1902–1907
- Part 03 Before the Lights Went Out 1908–1914
- Part 04 The War to End War 1914–1917
- Part 05 A Land Fit For Heroes 1918–1922
- Part 06 The Start of the Jazz Age 1923–1927
- Part 07 If I Had a Talking Picture 1927–1928
- Part 08 Learn To Croon 1928–1929
- Part 09 Ten Cents a Dance
- Part 10 Who's Afraid of the Big Bad Wolf? 1932–1933
- Part 11 Let's Face the Music 1934–1935
- Part 12 Thanks for the Memory 1936–1937
- Part 13 Over the Rainbow 1938–1939
- Part 14 The Stuff to Give the Troops 1939–1944
- Part 15 Business As Usual 1940–1942
- Part 16 Over There 1942–1945
- Part 17 My Guy's Come Home
- Part 18 There'll Be Some Changes Made
- Part 19 Revolutions in Sound 1948 – early 1950s
- Part 20 Music, Music, Music 1949–1952
- Part 21 There's Gold in Them Thar Hills - Early 1950s
- Part 22 Music to Make LPs By - Early 1950s
- Part 23 Bands of Hope and Glory - Mid 1950s
- Part 24 Trad and Other Fads
- Part 25 The Rocks Sets In - Late 1950s
- Part 26 Melody Lingers On - 1960s
