= The Deep Blue Sea (1955 film) =

1955 British film by Anatole Litvak

- Theatrical release poster
- Directed by: Anatole Litvak
- Written by: Terence Rattigan
- Produced by: Alexander Korda
- Starring: Vivien Leigh; Kenneth More; Eric Portman
- Cinematography: Jack Hildyard
- Edited by: Bert Bates
- Music by: Malcolm Arnold
- Production company: London Films
- Distributed by: Twentieth Century Fox
- Release date: 23 August 1955
- Running time: 96 minutes
- Country: United Kingdom
- Language: English
- Budget: £400,000

The Deep Blue Sea is a 1955 British drama film directed by Anatole Litvak, starring Vivien Leigh and Kenneth More, and produced by London Films and released by Twentieth Century Fox. It was written by Terence Rattigan based on his 1952 play of the same name.

== Premise ==
The film tells the story of a woman unhappy in her passionless marriage. She leaves her older husband for a younger and ardent lover.

== Cast ==
- Vivien Leigh as Hester Collyer
- Kenneth More as Freddie Page
- Eric Portman as Miller
- Emlyn Williams as Sir William Collyer
- Moira Lister as Dawn Maxwell
- Arthur Hill as Jackie Jackson
- Alec McCowen as Ken Thompson
- Dandy Nichols as Mrs. Elton
- Jimmy Hanley as Dicer Durston
- Miriam Karlin as barmaid
- Heather Thatcher as Lady Dawson
- Bill Shine as golfer
- Brian Oulton as drunk
- Gibb McLaughlin as clerk
- Sid James as man outside bar (as Sidney James)
- Gerald Campion as René (uncredited)

== Development ==
The play had been very successful and a number of companies expressed interest in obtaining the film rights. Alexander Korda offered £40,000 plus £10,000 to write the screenplay. He intended for Anatole Litvak to direct and Olivia de Havilland to star as Hesther. However, negotiations stalled when 20th Century Fox refused to let Litvak direct the film.

Some time later, Korda approached Rattigan again and he bought the screen rights for £7,500, plus £4,000 to Rattigan to write the script. Korda wanted Vivien Leigh to play Hesther, Kenneth More to play Freddie, and Charles Boyer to play Mr Miller, but said Leigh would not accept Rattigan's preferred director, Anthony Asquith. Rattigan started working on the script after the premiere of Separate Tables. Korda sold the project on to 20th Century Fox, which made him an instant profit. Fox insisted the film be directed by Anatole Litvak, and that it be in colour and CinemaScope. Boyer turned down the part of Mr Miller, so Eric Portman was cast. Litvak's influence meant Rattigan "opened up" the story, incorporating scenes such as Freddie and Hesther in a ski resort, and Freddie testing planes.

Kenneth More was the only key member of the original cast (who had also appeared in a BBC Television version in 1954) to be hired for the film, as Alexander Korda wanted to use names that were more recognisable to movie-goers. (More had just been put under contract to Korda.) More always felt this was a mistake, particularly the casting of Vivien Leigh rather than Peggy Ashcroft. He later wrote:

The casting of the beautiful Vivien Leigh was absurd. She was supposed to be an outwardly ordinary but secretly highly-sexed woman who meets a young pilot on the golf course and falls for him. My first lines on meeting her were to say: 'My God, Hes, you're beautiful.' She had never been told this before – and understandably it had a remarkable effect on her. But when the part is played by a woman generally held to be one of the most beautiful in the world, the whole meaning is lost.

=== Shooting ===
More did not enjoy filming, feeling that the use of CinemaScope and changes made to the original play detracted from the intimacy of the story. He also felt he had poor chemistry with Leigh. "We were never in complete accord," wrote More. "I thought her interpretation was wrong, and so when we played a scene together we had the wrong chemistry between us."

== Reception ==
The film was a box office disappointment in the US. "It was a tricky subject for American audiences", said More. More later said the film "just didn't come off".

The Monthly Film Bulletin wrote: "This adaptation by Terence Rattigan of his own play belongs to the new era of CinemaScoped film-plays; and the comparative failure of the venture can be attributed to unfortunate casting, an ill-suited director, and, of course, to the CinemaScope screen itself, with its unavoidable inflation of an essentially theatrical narrative which, on the stage, doubtless possessed greater dramatic force and unity."

Variety wrote: "The impeccable acting by the four principals is a highlight of the production. Although the basic plot calls for exceptional use of interiors, Litvak has employed his CinemaScope cameras to advantage, introducing fascinating shots of the embankment and Soho, as well as an exciting sequence from an air display plus some colorful scenes of winter sports. The overall effect is to achieve a healthy balance and to relieve the main dramatic tension."

Picture Show wrote: "Moving, superbly acted film version of Terence Rattigan's play which enthralled London. It is a tragedy through and through and tells of the disastrous, overwhelming love the wife of a judge has for a happy-go-lucky pilot. It is faithfully set and will grip you from beginning to end."

Leslie Halliwell wrote "Undistinguished adaptation of a very good play, hampered by wide screen and muddy colour, helped by thoughtful performances."

== Accolades ==
- 1955: Kenneth More won the Venice Film Festival "Volpi Cup" Best Actor award
- 1955: Anatole Litvak was nominated for the Venice Film Festival "Golden Lion"
- 1956: Kenneth More was nominated for the BAFTA Awards' Best British Actor
- 1956: Terence Rattigan was nominated for the BAFTA Awards' Best British Screenplay

== Availability ==
Currently unavailable on DVD, the film was given a rare screening as part of the BFI Vivien Leigh Season in 2013, introduced by Sean O'Connor, producer of the 2011 version of the film by Terence Davies. In November 2024, it was shown on Talking Pictures TV.
