= John Hallett =

John Hallett is the name of:

- John Hallett (Australian politician) (1917–1999), member of the Australian House of Representatives
- John Hallett (South Australian politician) (1804–1868), businessman, pastoralist and politician in the Colony of South Australia, implicated in a massacre of Aborigines
- John Hallett (1772–1794), a midshipman on HMS Bounty at the time of the mutiny
- John Hallet (fl. 1970s), also known as John Hallett, British actor
