= Digby, the Biggest Dog in the World =

- Film poster
- Directed by: Joseph McGrath
- Written by: Charles Isaacs; Ted Key (novel); Michael Pertwee
- Produced by: Walter Shenson
- Starring: Jim Dale; Angela Douglas; Spike Milligan
- Narrated by: Ted Key
- Cinematography: Harry Waxman
- Edited by: Jim Connock
- Music by: Edwin Astley
- Production company: Walter Shenson Films
- Distributed by: 20th Century-Fox (UK); Cinerama Releasing Corporation (US)
- Release date: 6 December 1973 (UK)
- Running time: 88 minutes
- Country: United Kingdom
- Language: English

Digby, the Biggest Dog in the World is a 1973 British children's fantasy-adventure comedy film starring Jim Dale, and directed by Joseph McGrath. A large supporting cast of British movie stalwarts includes Spike Milligan, Angela Douglas, Norman Rossington, Milo O'Shea, Dinsdale Landen and Victor Spinetti. The production included composer Edwin Astley and cinematographer Harry Waxman. The film was based on the 1960 novel The Biggest Dog in the World by Ted Key.

The film starred Fernville Lord Digby in the title role. Digby was then the reigning Dulux Old English Sheepdog; the company using the breed since 1961 in their advertisements that led to the breed's popularity around the world.

== Plot ==
Accident-prone Jeff works at a NATO research facility as an animal behaviourist. He steals a tiny amount of Project X, but an Old English Sheepdog accidentally drinks it. X is a liquid growth formula (a form of experimental fertilizer) and Digby expands to gigantic proportions.

Authorities and scientists scramble to find a way to shrink Digby back to normal size before he causes more destruction. Throughout the film, Digby's innocent nature and comedic antics make him a charming character despite his colossal size, and then at the end the film, he is given an antidote to shrink him back to his normal size.

== Cast ==
- Jim Dale as Jeff Eldon
- Angela Douglas as Janine
- Spike Milligan as Dr. Harz
- John Bluthal as Jerry
- Milo O'Shea as Dr. Jameson
- Norman Rossington as Tom
- Richard Beaumont as Billy White
- Dinsdale Landen as Colonel Masters
- Garfield Morgan as Rogerson
- Victor Spinetti as Professor Ribart
- Harry Towb as Ringmaster
- Kenneth J. Warren as General Frank
- Bob Todd as The Great Manzini
- Molly Urquhart as Aunt Ina
- Frank Thornton as Estate Agent
- Victor Maddern as Dog Home Manager
- Sheila Steafel as Control Operator
