= The Deep Blue Sea (Sunday Night Theatre) =

- Sunday Night Theatre episode
- Episode no.: Series 5 Episode 3
- Directed by: Julian Amyes
- Based on: The Deep Blue Sea by Terence Rattigan
- Original air date: 17 January 1954

"The Deep Blue Sea" is a 1954 British TV play based on the play by Terence Rattigan starring Kenneth More, reprising his role on stage.

it was performed twice, first on 17 January 1954 and again on the 21st, as part of Sunday Night Theatre.

== Cast ==
- Googie Withers as Hester Collier
- Kenneth More as Freddie Page
- Peter Illing as Mr. Miller
- Robert Harris as Sir William Collyer
- Raymond Francis as Jackie Jackson
- Dandy Nichols as Mrs. Elton
- David Aylmer as Philip Welch
- Gillian Lutyens as Ann Welch

== Reception ==
The program was popular and seen by 11 million people.

The Birmingham Mail called it "one of those rare productions that are utterly sure of themselves." The Evening Standard called it "sensitive and efficient." The Evening Standard said "it is difficult to find words to praise it enough."

More later played the role again in a 1955 film version. He was happier with this version of the play than the feature film version.
