= Undercover Girl =

Undercover Girl may refer to:

- Undercover Girl (1950 film), an American crime film noir
- Undercover Girl (1958 film), a British second feature crime film
