= Angela Douglas =

British actress

- Born: Angela McDonagh; 29 October 1940 (age 86); Gerrards Cross, England, United Kingdom
- Occupation: Actress
- Known for: Carry On Up the Khyber; Carry On Cowboy; The Comedy Man; Battlefield; Carry On Screaming!; Feet of Clay
- Spouses: Kenneth More (m. 1968; died 1982) Bill Bryden (m. 2009; died 2022)

Angela Douglas (born Angela McDonagh; born 29 October 1940) is an English actress.

== Early life ==
Douglas was born in Gerrards Cross, Buckinghamshire in 1940.

== Career ==
Douglas began acting as a teenager, joining the Worthing, West Sussex repertory company, before making her West End theatre debut in 1958.

Douglas made an uncredited appearance as an audience member in the 1958 film version of Six-Five Special. She made her (non-speaking) film debut in 1959 in The Shakedown, and then appeared with Tommy Steele in It's All Happening. She is best remembered for her roles in several Carry On Films in the 1960s, including Carry On Cowboy (1965) as an all-singing and trigger-happy version of Annie Oakley. She then appeared in Carry On Screaming! (1966), Follow That Camel (1967) and Carry On Up the Khyber (1968). She has, by virtue of this association, appeared on many retrospective and spin-off programmes. Douglas made an appearance in North Wales in September 2005 to unveil a plaque dedicated to the filming of Carry On Up the Khyber, as part of the movie had been shot in Llanberis.

Her other films have included The Comedy Man (1964), Digby, the Biggest Dog in the World (1973), and The Four Feathers (2002).

Her television credits have included Gideon's Way, The Avengers, The Saint; in which she played Jenny Turner, a psychology student in the episode The Death Game, Z-Cars, Dixon of Dock Green, Jason King, Doctor Who, Casualty, Holby City, Coronation Street, and Doctor at Large.

In 2001 she appeared in the Yorkshire Television period drama Heartbeat, in which she played Sonia Parking in the episode "Who's Who".

After her husband Kenneth More was diagnosed with Parkinson's disease, she put her career on hold, after 11 episodes of Oil Strike North. After More's death, she returned in various roles, including Doris Lethbridge-Stewart in Doctor Who serial Battlefield (1989), Peak Practice and Soldier, Soldier, in the episode "Band of Gold", which featured Robson & Jerome singing in an impromptu wedding band. She played the part of Isobel Trimble in Cardiac Arrest. She has since concentrated on a career in journalism and writing, having completed two books, including the autobiographical Swings and Roundabouts.

In October 2018 her debut novel, Josephine: An Open Book, was published. It is fictional but partly based on her own experiences.

== Personal life ==
Douglas met fellow actor Kenneth More on the set of Some People in Bristol in 1962, Douglas and More then began an affair. More divorced his wife. On 17 March 1968, the couple married and remained together until his death on 12 July 1982.

In 1988, Douglas met Scottish playwright and director Bill Bryden at a dinner party arranged by mutual friend Marsha Hunt. They married in 2009. Bryden died on 5 January 2022.

== Selected filmography ==
Year	Title	Role	Notes
1959	The Shakedown	Model	
1960	Feet of Clay	Diana White	
1961	The Wind of Change	Denise	
1961	Don't Bother to Knock	Girl in Gallery	uncredited
1961	The Gentle Terror	Nancy	
1961	Murder in Eden	Beatnik	
1962	Fate Takes a Hand	Secretary	
1962	Design for Loving	Bernie's secretary	
1962	Some People	Terry	
1963	It's All Happening	Julie Singleton	
1964	The Comedy Man	Fay Trubshaw	
1965	John Goldfarb, Please Come Home!	Mandy – Harem Girl	uncredited
1965	Carry On Cowboy	Annie Oakley	
1965	Gideon's Way Episode: "Morna"	Morna Copthorne	
1966	Carry On Screaming!	Doris Mann	
1967	The Saint	Jenny Turner	
1967	Maroc 7	Freddie	
1967	Follow That Camel	Lady Jane Ponsonby	
1967	Wuthering Heights	Isabella Linton	3 episodes
1968	Carry On Up the Khyber	Princess Jelhi	
1969	The Avengers	Miranda Loxton	
1971	Doctor at Large	Alison	
1972	Jason King	Dana Charles	
1973	Digby, the Biggest Dog in the World	Janine	
1974	Father Brown	Petra Merton	
1975	Oil Strike North	Julie Ward	13 episodes
1982	Third Time Lucky	Millie King	4 episodes
1989	Doctor Who	Doris	2 episodes
1996	Hamlet	Attendant to Gertrude	
1998	Shadow Run	Bridget	
1999	This Year's Love	Annabel	
2001	South Kensington	Camila's Mother	
2002	The Four Feathers	Aunt Mary	
