= Feet of Clay (1960 film) =

British crime drama by Frank Marshall

- Opening titles
- Directed by: Frank Marshall
- Written by: Mark Grantham
- Produced by: Edward J. Danziger; Harry Lee Danziger
- Starring: Vincent Ball; Wendy Williams
- Cinematography: James Wilson
- Edited by: Desmond Saunders
- Music by: Bill Le Sage
- Release date: 1960
- Country: United Kingdom
- Language: English

Feet of Clay is a 1960 British crime film directed by Frank Marshall and starring Vincent Ball, Wendy Williams and Hilda Fenemore. It was written by Mark Grantham and produced by The Danzigers.

== Plot ==
When Probation Officer Angela Richmond is found murdered, young probationer Jimmy Fuller is convicted. Solicitor David Kyle suspects that Fuller is covering up for Diana White, another resident of the hostel run by Richmond. He discovers that Richmond was using the hostel as a front for drug smuggling and had forced the residents to cooperate. He finds that Fuller is innocent of the murder and that Richmond had in fact been killed by the hostel's new proprietress Mrs. Clarke.

== Cast ==
- Vincent Ball as David Kyle
- Wendy Williams as Fay Kent
- Hilda Fenemore as Mrs. Clarke
- Robert Cawdron as Saunders
- Brian Smith as Jimmy Fuller
- Angela Douglas as Diana White
- Jack Melford as Soames
- Sandra Alfred as Ginny
- Arnold Bell as magistrate
- Alan Browning as Inspector Gill
- David Courtney as Detective Sergeant Lewis
- Howard Lang as warder
- Edith Saville as Angela Richmond
- Ian Wilson as signwriter

== Critical reception ==
The Monthly Film Bulletin wrote: "Drearily predictable mystery film, made with undisguised poverty of means and invention poverty."

Kine Weekly wrote: "The picture doesn't take long to unfold, but lack of tension makes it seem interminable. Vincent Ball is wasted as David, Wendy Williams has little to do as Fay, Hilda Fennemore is forced to show her hand as Mrs. Clarke, and Robert Cawdron blatently wears his villainy on his 'pan' as Saunders. The rest are given even less breaks. Its opening scenes take place in the hostel and from thence on the 'twist' ending is as predicable as quarter day."

The film historians Steve Chibnall and Brian McFarlane describe Feet of Clay as "oddly compelling", "set in a world of prison, drab night streets and stuffy private hotels". At the ending, "once the final flurry of fisticuffs is over, the young lovers embrace, but the acrid atmosphere of the film still hovers over their union".
