= Heart to Heart (The Largest Theatre in the World) =

1962 Episode of the TV play series The Largest Theatre in the World

- The Largest Theatre in the World episode
- Episode no.: Season 1 Episode 1
- Directed by: Alvin Rakoff
- Teleplay by: Terence Rattigan
- Original air date: 6 December 1962

Guest appearances
- Kenneth More as David Mann; Ralph Richardson as Sir Stanley Johnson; Angela Baddeley as Miss Knott; Wendy Craig as Jessie Weston; Derek Francis as Sir John Dawson-Brown; Jack Gwillim as Controller of Programmes; Megs Jenkins as Lady Johnson; Jean Marsh as Peggy Mann; Peter Sallis as Frankgodsell; Malcolm Patton as Callboy; John Matthews as Floor Manager; Stephen Hancock as Technical Operations Manager; Patrick Parnell as Vision Maker; Roy Wilson as Electrician; Martin Wyldeck as Cyril Browne; Henry Green as Prop Boy; John Rae as William; Stanley Hollingsworth as Chauffeur; Alan Howard as Parliamentary Private Secretary; Jean Alexander as Waitress; Trader Faulkner as Film Editor; Harold H. Dean as Toastmaster; George Betton as TUC Official; Anthea Wyndham as Announcer; Peter Layton as Sound Editor; Vincent Harding as Photographer; Susan Armstrong as Make-Up Assistant; Marion Horton as Supreme Chocolate Girl; Bill Cartwright as Curzon Cigarette Man; Kathleen Helme as Wheatie Flake Crispie Family Member; Brain Vanghan as Wheatley Flake Crispie Family Member; Kirk Martin as Wheatley Flake Crispie Family Member

Heart to Heart is a 1962 television play. It was written by Terence Rattigan, directed by Alvin Rakoff and starred Kenneth More.

It was the first production for The Largest Theatre in the World project. This involved a number of countries producing their own version of a television play which would be shown simultaneously.

== Premise ==
A television personality, David Mann, interviews a politician.

== Production ==
The script was commissioned from Rattigan. It was based on a show like Face to Face with John Freeman.

More had not appeared on television for a number of years when cast in this. His role had originally been offered to Richard Burton.

== Reception ==
Critical response to the production was excellent.

According to Peter Sallis, who was in the cast "The play went out and I don't think it was ever repeated. Whether the citizens of each country appreciated the fact that it was being shown in a different language next door at the same time I don't know. The effect it had on the history of television I would think was probably very slight, but it didn't do Terence Rattigan any harm."

Lyn Lockwood of The Daily Telegraph, called it an "exciting drama". He also praised it for the performances of Ralph Richardson and Kenneth More, and it's supporting cast.

The Belfast Telegraph praised it for the production, its plot and for the performances of Kenneth More, Ralph Richardson and Peter Sallis. At the same time they also criticized it for being too focused on romantic subplots.

== DVD release ==
The BBC released the play on DVD on the "Terence Rattigan Collection" which contains nine old BBC TV plays on five discs. The DVD was released on the 4 July 2011 on DVD Region 2.
