= Wendy Williams (British actress) =

British actress (1934–2019)

- Williams as Vira in The Ark in Space (Doctor Who) 1975
- Born: Annette Wendy Rickman Williams; 7 November 1934; Cheam, Surrey, England, UK
- Died: 17 October 2019 (aged 84); Warwickshire, England, UK
- Occupation: Actress
- Years active: 1954–1993
- Known for: Crossroads; The Ark in Space; Feet of Clay
- Spouse(s): Hugh David (1960–1987; his death); Michael Winser (1988–2019; her death)

Wendy Williams (7 November 1934 – 17 October 2019) was a British actress.

Williams is best known for her work on television, with credits including: Danger Man, Z-Cars, The Regiment, The Pallisers, Thriller, Doctor Who (in the serial The Ark in Space), Survivors, Poldark, Beau Geste, Tenko, and The Darling Buds of May. She had a long running role in Crossroads as Sally Banks, stepping in to the role at very short notice when the original actress Patricia Mort quit the series without notice. She also played the part of Fay Kent in Feet of Clay.

Williams was married to the television director Hugh David until his death in 1987. The following year, she married Michael Winser and they remained together until her death in 2019.
