= Alvin Rakoff =

Canadian director (1927–2024)

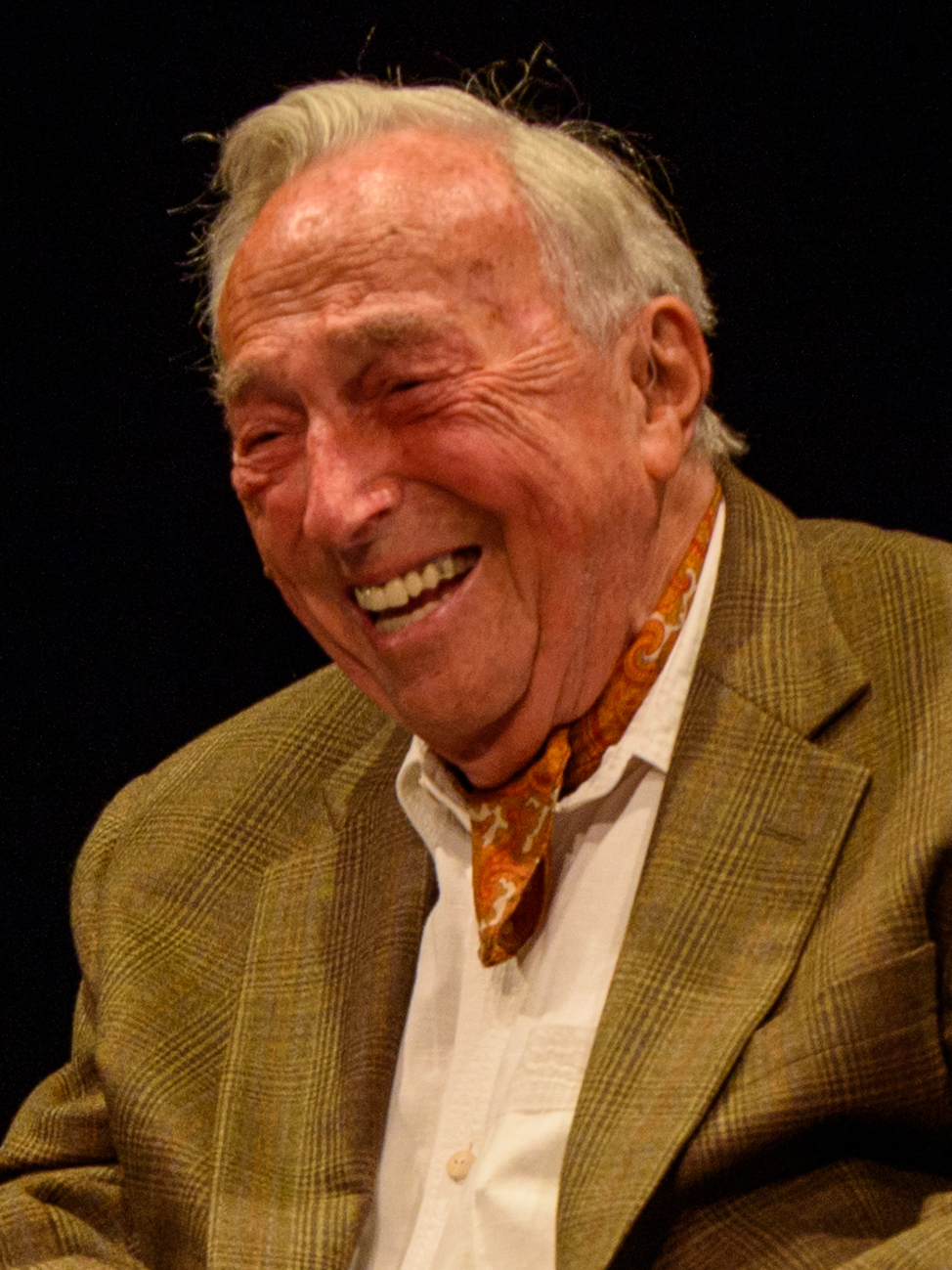
- Rakoff in 2021
- Born: Abraham Rakoff; 6 February 1927; Toronto, Ontario, Canada
- Died: 12 October 2024 (aged 97); Chiswick, London, England
- Occupation: Director
- Spouses: Jacqueline Hill (m. 1958; died 1993); Sally Hughes (m. 2013)
- Children: 2
- Website: alvinrakoff.com

Alvin Rakoff (born Abraham Rakoff; 6 February 1927 – 12 October 2024) was a Canadian director of theatre, film, and television.

== Early life and education ==
The son of Jewish emigrants from the Russian Empire, Rakoff was born in Toronto born on 6 February 1927. He was the third of seven children of Pearl (nee Isenberg) and Samuel Rakoff, who had a shop in Kensington Market. When Rakoff was 16, after facing antisemitism, he changed his first name to Alvin, inspired by Alvin York and the film Sergeant York.

After graduation from the University of Toronto, he became a journalist and began writing for the CBC's nascent television service, where Sydney Newman was head of the drama department. In 1952, he moved to London, England to work at the BBC.

== Career ==
A BBC adaptation in 1953 of the Irwin Shaw novel The Troubled Air was his first major writing assignment for television. In 1954, his production of Waiting For Gillian won the Daily Mail's National TV Award with actors Patrick Barr and Anne Crawford also honoured. He later recreated this production in French for transmission throughout France.

In 1962, the BBC asked Rakoff to produce/direct its entry for the European-wide 'The Largest Theatre In The World' written especially for the occasion by Terence Rattigan and called Heart to Heart, with Kenneth More and Ralph Richardson. In 1964, when the new channel BBC 2 was launched Rakoff was selected to direct plays filling the first three Sunday-night drama slots (The Seekers). He won his first Emmy Award in 1967 for Call Me Daddy, which had featured Donald Pleasence, and 15 years later won it again for A Voyage Round My Father (Laurence Olivier, Alan Bates, and Jane Asher took the leads) which he produced and directed.

Rakoff's writing included Too Marvellous For Words, the story of lyricist Johnny Mercer presented at The Mill Theatre, Sonning, and King's Head Theatre, London. He had written three novels. His first, & Gillian, a romantic novel, was translated into 10 languages. His second, Baldwin Street, based on his early days in his parents' shop in Toronto, was published in 2008. The Seven Einsteins, a third novel, is a genetic thriller published in 2014. An adaptation of Raymond Chandler's The Big Sleep was produced in 2012.

Rakoff's theatre work ranged from Hamlet at Bristol Old Vic to a Charity Cruise performance at the Royal Albert Hall before Her Majesty the Queen, and continued with his association with The Mill Theatre, Sonning, directing productions of Separate Tables with Anthony Valentine and his own adaptation of Chandler's The Big Sleep.

In 2010, Rakoff directed A Sentimental Journey, the story of Doris Day, at Wilton's Music Hall, London, and subsequently (2012) El Portal Theatre, Hollywood.

Rakoff was also a president of the Directors Guild of Great Britain.

He worked with actors including Laurence Olivier, Peter Sellers, Sean Connery, Judi Dench, Rex Harrison, Rod Steiger, Henry Fonda and Ava Gardner.

Rakoff awarded Sean Connery his first leading role, and gave Alan Rickman his first job when he was a drama student. Other actors he worked with early in their careers include Michael Crawford, Jeremy Irons, and Michael Caine.

== Death ==
Rakoff died at his home in Chiswick, London on 12 October 2024, aged 97.

== Filmography ==
=== Feature films (director) ===
Year	Film
1958	Passport to Shame
1959	The Treasure of San Teresa
1961	World in My Pocket
1964	The Comedy Man
1969	Crossplot
1970	Hoffman
1971	Say Hello to Yesterday
1979	City on Fire
1979	King Solomon's Treasure
1980	Death Ship
1981	Dirty Tricks

=== Television (director) ===
Year	Title
1953	Holiday Girl
1953	Starlight
1953	A Place of Execution
1953	Strictly Personal
1953	The Emperor Jones by Eugene O'Neill
1954	Willie the Squouse
1954	The Lover
1954	Waiting for Gillian
1955	Waiting for Gillian (French TV version form Paris, re-titled Un Chemin Dans La Nuit)
1954	The Face of Love
1954	Return to the River
1954	The Good Partners
1954	Tyrant's Tower
1954	Teckman Biography by Francis Durbridge
1955	Three Empty Rooms by Reginald Rose
1955	The New Executive
1955	The Hole in the Wall
1955	Thunder in the Realm (Canada)
1955	The Legend of Pepito
1956	The Reclining Figure
1956	For the Defence
1956	The Condemned
1956	Epitaph
1956	The Seat of the Scornful
1956	No Man's Land
1957	Dial 999 (series, 4 episodes)
1957	The Staring Match
1957	Sunday Night Theatre: Requiem for a Heavyweight
1957	Our Town
1958	The Caine Mutiny Court Martial
1958	Breakdown
1958	Man in the Corner
1959	Velvet Alley
1959	The Ransom of Red Chief (USA)
1959	The Dark Side of the Earth
1960	The Leather Jungle
1960	A Town Has Turned to Dust
1960	Come In Razor Red
1961	Joker's Justice
1961	The Room by Harold Pinter
1961	A Reason for Staying
1962	Heart to Heart by Terence Rattigan ("The Largest Theatre in the World", European Union television drama entry)
1962	A Quiet Game of Cards
1962	Call Me Back
1963	The Remarkable Incident at Carsons Corners
1964	The Seekers
1964	The Blackpool Trilogy
1965	Court Martial (series)
1966	You'll Know Me by the Stars in My Eyes
1966	The Move After Checkmate
1966	The Sweet War Man
1967	The Girl
1967	The Man Who Understood Women
1967	Call Me Daddy (Emmy Award)
1968	Murder
1971	A Kiss Is Just a Kiss
1971	Summer and Smoke
1972	Blur & Blank via Cleckheaton
1972	A Man About a Dog
1972	The Adventures of Don Quixote
1973	Shadow of a Gunman
1973	Harlequinade
1974	Cheap in August
1974	Jan & Tony, "Rooms"
1974	How to Impeach A President (USA)
1974	A Brisk Dip Sagaciously Considered
1974	Shall We Have a King? (USA)
1975	Husband to Mrs Fitzherbert
1975	The Nicest Man in the World
1975	The October Crisis (Canada)
1975	Lulu Street (Canada)
1975	The Liberty Tree
1976	The Killers
1976	In Praise of Love
1976	Mrs Amsworth
1976	The Promise
1976	The Dame Of Sark
1977	The Kitchen
1978	Romeo & Juliet
1980	The Quiet Days of Mrs Stafford
1981	The Breadwinner
1982	Disraeli
1982	A Voyage Round My Father
1983	Firework For Elspeth
1983	Mr Halpern & Mr Johnson
1983	A Talent for Murder
1984	The First Olympics, Athens 1896
1985	Paradise Postponed
1989	Haunting Harmony
1990	Gas & Candles
1991/1992	Sam Saturday
1992	The Best Of Friends
1997	A Dance to the Music of Time

=== Writing (television, films, books) ===
Year	Title	Role
1953	The Troubled Air	adaptor (TV)
1953	A Flight of Fancy	writer (TV)
1953	Our Town	adaptor (TV)
1954	Waiting for Gillian	co-adaptor (TV)
1958	The Caine Mutiny Court Martial	adaptor (TV)
1970	Say Hello To Yesterday	writer (film)
1973	A Man About Dog	adaptor (TV)
1973	Shadow Of A Gunman	adaptor (TV)
1978	City On Fire	co-writer (film)
1991/92	Sam Saturday	creator (TV series)
1996	& Gillian	(novel, Little Brown)
2001/02	Too Marvelous For Words	writer (musical)
2008	Baldwin Street	(novel, Bunim & Bannigan, New York)
2012	The Big Sleep by Raymond Chandler	(stage adaptation)
2014	The Seven Einsteins	(novel, Author House)

== Stage credits ==
Year	Title	Venue	Notes
1965	Hamlet	Bristol Old Vic, Bristol	
1982	Celia Johnson Theatre Fund Performance	Aldwych Theatre, London	
1984	Cruise Charity Gala Performance	Royal Albert Hall, London	
1995	Stage Struck	The Mill at Sonning, Berkshire	
2001–02	Too Marvelous For Words	The Mill at Sonning, Berkshire	Also writer
2002	Too Marvelous For Words	King's Head Theatre, London	Also writer
2004	I Remember You	The Mill at Sonning, Berkshire	
2005	Separate Tables	The Mill at Sonning, Berkshire	
2007	Same Time Next Year	The Mill at Sonning, Berkshire	
2009	A Sentimental Journey	The Mill at Sonning, Berkshire	
2011	A Sentimental Journey	Wilton's Music Hall, London	
2011	A Sentimental Journey	Edinburgh Festival Theatre, Edinburgh	
2011	A Sentimental Journey	El Portal Theater, Los Angeles	
2011	The Big Sleep	The Mill at Sonning, Berkshire	
