= Toad of Toad Hall (film) =

1946 television film by Michael Berry

- Genre: Children's
- Based on: Toad of Toad Hall by A.A. Milne The Wind in the Willows by Kenneth Grahame
- Written by: Michael Barry
- Directed by: Michael Barry
- Country of origin: United Kingdom
- Original language: English

Production
- Running time: 90 mins
- Production company: BBC

Original release
- Network: BBC
- Release: 29 December 1946

Toad of Toad Hall is a 1946 British TV adaptation of the 1929 play Toad of Toad Hall by A. A. Milne, itself an adaptation of the 1908 novel The Wind in the Willows by Kenneth Grahame.

It was produced by Michael Barry who presented the same play again the following year with many different cast members. It was an early television appearance by Kenneth More who reprised the role several times on stage.

The adaptation aired every Christmas for four years' running.

== Cast ==
- Ronald Long as Toad
- Kenneth More as Badger
- Jon Pertwee as Judge
- Julia Bradock as Marigold
- Madoline Thomas as Mother
- Jack Newmark as Mole
- Andrew Osborn as Water Rat
- Victor Woolf as Alfred, the horse
