= The Regiment (TV series) =

1972 British TV drama series

- Genre: Drama
- Created by: Jack Gerson; Nick McCarty; William Slater
- Starring: Christopher Cazenove
- Country of origin: United Kingdom
- No. of series: 2
- No. of episodes: 23

Production
- Producers: Royston Morley; Terence Dudley
- Production company: BBC

Original release
- Network: BBC One
- Release: 21 February 1972 – 4 May 1973

The Regiment is a British television drama series produced by the BBC. First broadcast on BBC One in 1972 it starred Christopher Cazenove and followed the story of a British Army regiment from the view of two families.

The Regiment was based on a single play broadcast in 1970 as part of the BBC Drama Playhouse series. The series followed the fictional Cotswold Regiment from 1895 to 1904, and in particular the Gaunt and Bright families. The first series was broadcast in 1972 and related to the regiment's time in South Africa, fighting in the Boer War, while the second series in 1973 followed the regiment on a posting to British India.

It once received a brief review in the Glasgow Weekly News "The Regiment: ought to be disbanded".

The theme music to the series was the finale of the Triumphal March from "Caractacus" by Sir Edward Elgar.

== Cast List ==
| Actor | Character |
|---|---|
| Christopher Cazenove | Lt/Capt Richard Gaunt |
| Maria Aitken | Dorothy Saunders |
| Wendy Allnutt | Charlotte Gaunt |
| Virginia Balfour | Mrs Cranleigh-Osborne |
| James Bate | Cpl Ernest Bright |
| Michael Brennan | RSM William Bright |
| Bernard Brown | Capt/Major Robert Saunders |
| Shirley Dixon | Maud Slingsby |
| Michael Elwyn | Lt Henry Percival |
| John Hallam | Lt James Willoughby |
| John Hallet | Private Hodge |
| Roy Herrick | Lt/Capt Jeffrey Sissons |
| Penelope Lee | Dr Mary Mitcheson/Gaunt |
| Denis Lill | Captain/Major Alfred Slingsby |
| Frederick Treves | Col Cranleigh-Osborne |
| Wendy Williams | Alice Gaunt |
| Richard Wordsworth | Lt Col Gaunt-Seymour |
