= John Hallet =

British actor

- Occupation: Actor
- Notable work: Survivors; Z-Cars; Doctor Who

John Hallet is a British actor, probably best known for his role as Barney in the 1970s television drama Survivors.

Other TV credits include: Z-Cars, The Regiment as regular Pte Hodge, Oil Strike North, All Creatures Great and Small, Call Me Mister and the uncompleted Doctor Who serial Shada.
