= Alan Browning =

English actor (1926–1979)

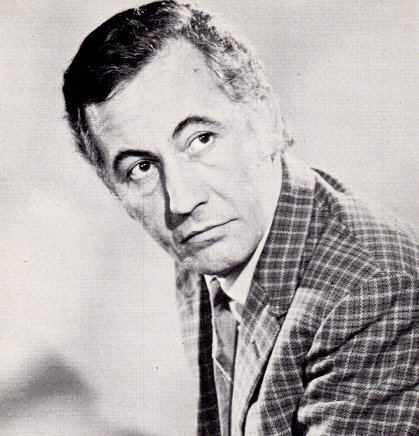
- Publicity photograph of Alan Browning, 1971
- Born: Alan Brown; 23 March 1926; Sunderland, England
- Died: 7 September 1979 (aged 53); Stockport, England
- Years active: 1957–1978
- Spouses: Anne Bishop (m. 1954; div. 1972) Pat Phoenix (m. 1972)
- Children: 2

Alan Brown (23 March 1926 – 7 September 1979), known professionally as Alan Browning, was an English actor.

Whilst working by day as a reporter for a local paper in Newcastle upon Tyne in the 1950s, he began acting as an amateur at the People's Theatre. He then moved to London to work for a news agency and was sent abroad to Cairo, where he met his first wife (Anne) who was serving in the Women's Royal Naval Service (Wrens).

On their return to the UK, and following encouragement from Anne, he began to seek work as an actor. Very soon he was cast as King John in a pair of educational films made for Encyclopedia Britannica, and then became a regular 'extra' playing bit parts in TV series such as Z-Cars, The Saint, and The Avengers. He also starred as Chief Officer Steve Rettar in the ABC series Jezebel in 1963.

He became a household name in the UK when he was cast as Ellis Cooper in The Newcomers (1965-1968), but is best remembered for portraying Alan Howard in the television series Coronation Street, a role he played from 1969 to 1973. He was married to his Coronation Street co-star Pat Phoenix from 23 December 1972, until his 1979 death from liver failure as a result of his heavy alcohol intake. Phoenix also played his onscreen wife, Elsie Tanner, in Coronation Street.

The pair left The Street in 1973 and toured the UK and New Zealand with theatrical productions of Gaslight and Random Harvest, both directed by Browning, before Phoenix rejoined the cast of The Street. Browning also recorded an LP of jazz standards called "Whisky & Milk" (a reference to his preferred drink, being easier on the stomach than neat whisky) with the Tony Hayes Quartet in 1975.

Browning's other television appearances included Interpol Calling (1960), Dr. Finlay's Casebook (1962), Maigret (1963), The Plane Makers (1964), The War of Darkie Pilbeam (1968), Big Breadwinner Hog (1969), The Onedin Line (1971), The Fear Is Spreading (an episode of the TV series Thriller, 1975), When the Boat Comes In (1976), and a leading role in The Cedar Tree (1976–77). His final credits were in 1978 in the episode '1914, Call to Arms' of A Horseman Riding By as Fred Purcell and an episode of Return of the Saint.

His film credits included Feet of Clay (1960), Fury at Smugglers' Bay (1961), Cleopatra (1963), Guns at Batasi (1964), and Julius Caesar (1970).

Alan Browning was cremated at Golders Green Crematorium on 14 September 1979.

== Filmography ==
Year	Title	Role	Notes
1959	Magna Carta	King John	Britannica Films
1960	The Two Faces of Dr. Jekyll	Young Blood	Uncredited
1961	Feet of Clay	Inspector Gill	
1961	Fury at Smugglers' Bay	2nd Highwayman	
1961	The Pursuers	Fritz's Assistant on film set	Uncredited
1961	Part-Time Wife	Police Sergeant	
1963	Cleopatra	Senator / Soldier	Uncredited
1964	The Comedy Man	Auditioning actor	Uncredited
1964	Guns at Batasi	Adjutant	
1970	Julius Caesar	Marullus	
