= Yvonne Buckingham =

British former actress (born 1936)

- Born: Elizabeth D V Buckingham; 28 March 1936 (age 90); Ripon, Yorkshire, UK
- Other name: Yvonne Buckingham Slezynger
- Education: Royal Academy of Dramatic Art, 1959–1960
- Occupation: Former actress
- Years active: 1957–1963 UK; 1972–1988 Brazil
- Known for: Portraying Christine Keeler in The Christine Keeler Story
- Notable work: Sapphire, 1959; The Christine Keeler Story, 1963
- Spouse: Henri Armand Slezynger (m. 1965, divorced)
- Children: 4

Yvonne Buckingham (née Elizabeth D V Buckingham, married name Slezynger; born 28 March 1936) is a former British actress based in Brazil, known for portraying Christine Keeler in the 1963 film The Christine Keeler Story.

== Early life and family ==
Buckingham was born Elizabeth D V Buckingham on the 28 March 1936 in Ripon, Yorkshire to Edward Buckingham and Mary Buckingham (née Atkinson). (Note: Also cited as 1937.) In 1965, Buckingham married Belgian-Brazilian businessperson Henri Armand Slezynger in London. The couple subsequently moved to São Paulo and had four children before later divorcing.

== Career ==
=== 1950s ===
In an early role, Buckingham played the part of a saloon girl in the Jack Lee direct film Robbery Under Arms. In 1958, she played Mario's girlfriend in the comedy Next to No Time. In 1959, Buckingham played the eponymous role in the film Sapphire about a young woman found murdered on Hampstead Heath, but she did not have a speaking part and appears only briefly, as a dead body and in photographs.

Following her uncredited role in Our Man in Havana (1959), Buckingham enrolled at the Royal Academy of Dramatic Art. In 1960, Buckingham graduated with a diploma in acting.

=== 1960s ===
Buckingham had prominent roles in two 1961 films, A Question of Suspense and Murder in Eden. As a result, she forfeited £4,000 which might have been paid from an insurance policy she took out in 1958 when she was aged 20, against failure to become a star within five years.

In 1962, she had a minor background role as "pretty girl" in the Neo Noir film, The Frightened City. In 1963, Buckingham played the lead role in The Keeler Affair, a film about Christine Keeler. Before Buckingham had secured the role, it was offered to Keeler who accepted it but because the Actors Equity did not accept her application, it meant that the other cast members could not perform with her.

=== 1970s and 80s ===
In the late 1980s, she had a role in the Marcio Kogan, Isay Weinfeld directed film, Fogo e Paixão, which was a film about a bus tour through São Paulo where strange people are encountered. One of the tourists, a Japanese man called Kankeo (played by Ken Kaneko), filmed the event and shows it to his friends when he returns home.

== Filmography ==
Year	Title	Role	Notes	Ref(s)
1957	Robbery Under Arms			
1958	Grip of the Strangler			
1958	Next to No Time	Mario's girlfriend	Uncredited	
1958	Blood of the Vampire	Serving Wench	Uncredited	
1958	Passport to Shame			
1959	The Captain's Table	Yvonne, chosen life-jacket volunteer		
1959	Room at the Top	Girl at tote window		
1959	No Trees in the Street			
1959	Sapphire	Sapphire Robbins		
1959	Desert Mice	Waitress		
1959	Our Man in Havana	Striptease girl		
1959	Urge to Kill	Gwen		
1960	The Tell-Tale Heart	Mina		
1961	The Frightened City	Pretty girl at 'Taboo Club'		
1961	The Sinister Man	Miss Russell		
1961	Murder in Eden	Vicky Wolf		
1961	A Question of Suspense	Jean Forbes		
1962	Solo for Sparrow	Jenny		
1962	A Kind of Loving	Barmaid		
1963	The Keeler Affair	Christine Keeler	Title role	
1972	Missão: Matar	Iracema Freire Campos	Directed by Alberto Pieralisi. Adapted from Always Kill a Stranger (1967) by Robert L. Fish	
1988	Fogo e Paixão	Martha Miller	Directed by Isay Weinfeld and Marcio Kogan	

=== Television ===
Title	Episode #	Role	Director	Year	Notes
ITV Television Playhouse	The Heat of the Evening	Muriel	David Boisseau	1958	Season 4, Episode 15
The Edgar Wallace Mystery Theatre	Urge To Kill	Gwen Foley	Vernon Sewell	1959 (Dec.)	Season 1, Episode 1
Inside Story	A Girl for George	Gloria		1960	Season 1, Episode 5
Arthur's Treasured Volumes	A Slight Case of Deception	Cynthia		1960	Season 1, Episode 5 Arthur Haynes
The Benny Hill Show	Episode #5.1	Various roles		1961	Season 5, Episode 1
Sir Francis Drake (TV series)	Mission to Paris	Heloise	David Greene	1962	Season 1, Episode 20
Z Cars	Winner Take All	Pam	Eric Hills	1962	Season 1, Episode 19
The Edgar Wallace Mystery Theatre	The Sinister Man	Miss Russell	Clive Donner	1961	Season 2, Episode 7
The Edgar Wallace Mystery Theatre	Solo for Sparrow	Jenny	Gordon Flemyng	1962	Season 3, Episode 5
No Hiding Place	Corpse for the Cup	Nora Heneghan	Richard Doubleday, Richard Sidwell	1962	Season 4, Episode 26
The Valiant Varneys	Episode #1.9		Peter Whitmore	1962	Season 1, Episode 9
