= Miss Tulip Stays the Night =

- Directed by: Leslie Arliss
- Written by: John O. Douglas uncredited Jack Hulbert; Bill Luckwell
- Based on: play by Nan Marriott-Watson
- Produced by: John O. Douglas; Bill Luckwell associate Derek Winn
- Starring: Diana Dors; Patrick Holt; Jack Hulbert; Cicely Courtneidge
- Cinematography: Kenneth Talbot
- Edited by: Sam Simmonds
- Production company: Jaywell
- Distributed by: Adelphi Films Ltd. (UK)
- Release date: July 1955 (UK)
- Running time: 68 minutes
- Country: United Kingdom
- Language: English
- Budget: £40,000

Miss Tulip Stays the Night (also known as Dead by Morning) is a 1955 British comedy crime film starring Diana Dors, Patrick Holt, Jack Hulbert and Cicely Courtneidge. It was the last major feature film directed by Leslie Arliss. The screenplay concerns a crime writer and his wife who stay at a country house where a mysterious corpse appears.

== Plot ==
Novelist Andrew Dax and his wife Kate are sleeping peacefully in their new cottage when a mysterious older lady arrives, apparently stranded in a storm. She hands Andrew her gun and some jewellery for safe keeping, and asks for a bed for the night. She is shot during the night and Andrew is accused of the crime. He must act as a detective to defend himself.

== Cast ==
- Diana Dors as Kate Dax
- Patrick Holt as Andrew Dax
- Jack Hulbert as Constable Feathers
- Cicely Courtneidge as Millicent Tulip/Angela Tulip
- A. E. Matthews as Mr Potts
- Joss Ambler as Inspector Thorne
- Pat Terry-Thomas (Ida Patlanski) as Judith Gale
- George Roderick as Sergeant Akers
- Brian Oulton as Dr. Willis
- Ian Wilson as Police photographer
- Archie Terry-Thomas as Archie Dax (dog)

== Production ==
The script was based on a radio play by Nan Marriott-Watson that had been performed on Australian radio in 1948.

Ron Randell was reportedly offered the lead. The casting of Jack Hulbert and Cicely Courtnidge was announced in August 1954 and marked the first time they had appeared in a film together since 1939. Diana Dors was paid £1,500 for her work.

Miss Tulip Stays the Night was the first film produced by Jaywell, the company formed by producer and screenwriter Bill Luckwell. Producer John O. Douglas handled sound on Hulbert's early films and director Leslie Arliss had written scripts for Courtidge and Hulbert.

The film was shot at the studio at Walton-on-Thames in July 1954.

== Reception ==
The Monthly Film Bulletin called Miss Tulip Stays the Night "a remarkably poor piece of craftsmanship in almost every sense."

The Guardian wrote: "The stupendous silliness of its plot and dialogue gives a certain wild period charm to 'Miss Tulip Stays the Night.'"

Critic John Stratten of the Manchester Evening News wrote: "Miss Diana Dors may not like to be reminded of [the film], which belongs to a period before she was concerned with being a super-charged emotional actress. But, despite some pretty heavy-handed direction, it is good homely fun."

The Walsall Observer wrote that the film "... has a weak story, though the acting cannot be given the same description. ... The conclusion is not by any means brilliant and nothing particularly outstanding happens at any point in the film."
