= The Deep Blue Sea (play) =

1952 play written by Terence Rattigan

First edition (publ. Hamish Hamilton)

The Deep Blue Sea is a British stage play by Terence Rattigan from 1952. Rattigan based his story and characters in part on his secret relationship with Kenny Morgan, and the aftermath of the end of their relationship. The play was first performed in London on 6 March 1952, directed by Frith Banbury, and won praise for actress Peggy Ashcroft, who co-starred with Kenneth More. In the US, the Plymouth Theater staged the play in October 1952, with Margaret Sullavan. The play with Sullavan subsequently transferred to Broadway, with its Broadway premiere on 5 November 1953, and running for 132 performances.

Prior to Rattigan's coding of his relationship with Morgan into the heterosexual relationship between Hester and Freddie, his first draft of the play more specifically treated the relationship between the lead characters as a homosexual relationship. It also hinted that the reason for the striking off of Miller, the ex-doctor in the play, from the medical register was Miller's homosexuality.

== Plot summary ==
Taking place over the course of one day, the play begins with the discovery of Hester Collyer in her flat by her neighbours, after Hester has failed in an attempt to take her own life by gassing herself. In flashback, sometime before, Hester left her husband, Sir William Collyer, a respectable High Court judge, for Freddie Page, a semi-alcoholic former RAF pilot. Their relationship was physical and passionate, but his ardour eventually cooled, leaving her emotionally stranded and desperate. Initially unemployed, Freddie eventually takes a post in South America. The aftershocks of her attempted suicide unravel even the remnants of this relationship.

By the end of the day, Hester is brought to a hard decision to live, partly through the intercession of another resident of the tenement house, Mr. Miller, an ex-doctor who has been struck off the register for an undisclosed reason. These two outcasts find a curious kinship.

== Revivals ==
Revivals of the play have included:

- 1971: Yvonne Arnaud Theatre Guildford, with Isabel Dean
- 1972: Nottingham, with Isabel Dean
- 1977: Croydon and Cambridge, with Sheila Hancock and Clive Francis
- 1977: Ten-week UK tour, with Honor Blackman
- 1981: Greenwich Theatre, with Dorothy Tutin and Clive Francis
- 1988: Haymarket Theatre, London: with Penelope Keith
- 1993: Almeida Theatre, London, then Apollo Theatre, London, with Penelope Wilton and Linus Roache
- 1997: Royal Exchange, Manchester with Susan Wooldridge. Directed by Marianne Elliott.
- 1998: Roundabout Theatre Company, New York City, with Blythe Danner, Edward Herrmann, and David Conrad
- 2003: Richmond Theatre, London, with Harriet Walter, Neil Stacy, Robert Portal and Roger Lloyd-Pack
- 2008: Six-week UK tour then Vaudeville Theatre, London, with Greta Scacchi, Dugald Bruce-Lockhart, and Simon Williams
- 2011: West Yorkshire Playhouse, Leeds, with Maxine Peake and Lex Shrapnel
- 2011: Chichester Festival Theatre, with Amanda Root, Anthony Calf and John Hopkins
- 2016: National Theatre, London, with Helen McCrory, Peter Sullivan, and Tom Burke
- 2019: Chichester Festival Theatre (Minerva Studio), with Nancy Carroll
- 2024: Ustinov Studio, Bath, with Tamsin Greig

== Adaptations ==
A number of adaptations for other media of The Deep Blue Sea have been made. The first, for BBC Television, was broadcast live on 17 and 21 January 1954 in the Sunday Night Theatre strand, with Kenneth More as Freddie and Googie Withers as Hester. Also, Withers toured Australia and New Zealand in a production presented by JC Williamson Theatres. A further BBC version, in the Play of the Month series, was transmitted on 17 March 1974. Directed by Rudolph Cartier, it starred Peter Egan (Freddie), and Virginia McKenna (Hester).

The most recent BBC adaptation, in the Performance strand, was transmitted on 12 November 1994, directed by Karel Reisz, with Colin Firth (Freddie Page), Penelope Wilton (Hester Collyer), and Ian Holm (William Collyer).

In 2009, BBC Radio Three broadcast a radio adaptation, starring Carolyn Pickles as Hester and Anton Lesser as William Collyer. This was repeated in 2016.

A feature film version directed by Anatole Litvak was released in 1955, with More reprising the role of Freddie, and Vivien Leigh as Hester.

In 2011, a second feature film adaptation was released, directed by Terence Davies and featuring Rachel Weisz, Tom Hiddleston, and Simon Russell Beale.

The 2016 National Theatre version of the play, starring Helen McCrory as Hester, was filmed and shown live in cinemas worldwide on 1 September 2016 as part of National Theatre Live. This filmed performance was made available for one week on YouTube in July 2020 during the COVID-19 pandemic as part of National Theatre At Home.
