= Bernard Brown (actor) =

British actor (born 1933)

- Born: Graham Bernard Brown; 10 February 1933 (age 93); Deal, Kent, England
- Education: Royal Academy of Dramatic Art
- Occupation: Actor
- Spouse: Joan How (m. 1958; div. 1963)

Bernard Brown (born 10 February 1933) was a British actor.

== Life ==
Bernard Brown trained at RADA, graduating in 1954.

Through his career in England he appeared in stage productions such as The Unexpected Guest by Agatha Christie, Queen Christina by Pam Gems, and House Guest by Francis Durbridge. In South Africa he played the lead role in King Richard II by William Shakespeare at Maynardville in 1968, participated in Present Laughter by Noël Coward at Alexander Theatre in 1969, performed Joseph Surface in The School for Scandal by Richard Brinsley Sheridan at the Hofmeyr Theatre in 1969, Malvolio in Twelfth Night by William Shakespeare at the Hofmeyr Theatre in 1969, and roles in other stage productions. In 1972 Brown directed Macbeth, presented by Cape Performing Arts Board.

His film appearances include The Trials of Oscar Wilde (1960), Taste of Fear (1961), and Plenty (1985). He participated in television series such as The Edwardians, The Regiment, The Pallisers and May to December. Brown's last screen credit was in the detective drama television series Inspector Morse in 1996.

Brown is deceased.

== Selected filmography ==
=== Television ===
Year	Title	Role	Notes
1957	The Buccaneers	Chris Meadows	Episode: "Dan Tempest Holds an Auction"
1959	World Theatre	Bonario	Episode: "Volpone"
1959	Spycatcher		Episode: "The Gentle Gestapo Man"
1960	Deadline Midnight	John Stafford	Episode #1.7
1960	Barnaby Rudge	Mr. Edward Chester	9 Episodes
1961-62	Probation Officer	Stephen Ryder	8 Episodes
1963	No Hiding Place	Richard Bright	Episode: "Last Flight"
1963	The Plane Makers	Simon Wanleigh	2 Episodes
1964	The Avengers	Peterson	Episode: "Concerto"
1964	Sergeant Cork	Captain McArthur	Episode: "The Case of Big Ben Lewis"
1965	Gideon's Way	Ralph Mason	Episode: "The Wall"
1967	The Newcomers	George Little	3 Episodes
1967	City '68		2 Episodes
1971	The Doctors	Dr. Clarkson	2 Episodes
1971	The Misfit	Mr. Simpson	Episode: "On the National Health"
1972	Dead of Night	Frank Warley	Episode: "Return Flight"
1972	The Edwardians	Captain the Hon. George Anson	Episode: "Conan Doyle"
1972-73	The Regiment	Rupert Saunders	14 Episodes
1974	The Pallisers	John Grey	4 Episodes
1975	Nightingale's Boys	Headmaster	3 Episodes
1977	Who Pays the Ferryman?	David Haldane	Episode: "Return to Yesterday"
1977	Van der Valk	Henniker	Episode: "In Hazard"
1981	Strangers	French	Episode: "The Loneliness of the Long Distance Copper"
1982	Nancy Astor	Robert Brand	3 Episodes
1984	Strangers and Brothers	Drawbell	Episode #1.7
1987	Screen Two	Sir William	Episode: "Going Home"
1989	Countdown to War	Corbin	TV Film
1990	Inspector Morse	Wheatley	Episode: "The Sins of the Fathers"
1991-94	May to December	Gerald	5 Episodes
1996	Inspector Morse	Dr. Felix McClure	Episode: "The Daughters of Cain"
