= The Comedy Man =

1964 British film by Alvin Rakoff

- Directed by: Alvin Rakoff
- Written by: Peter Yeldham
- Based on: novel by Douglas Hayes
- Produced by: David Henley; Jon Penington
- Starring: Kenneth More
- Cinematography: Ken Hodges
- Edited by: Ernest Hosler
- Music by: Bill McGuffie
- Production companies: Consant Films; Gray-Film
- Distributed by: British Lion Film Corporation (UK)
- Release dates: 3 September 1964 (London, UK)
- Running time: 92 minutes
- Country: United Kingdom
- Language: English

The Comedy Man is a 1964 British kitchen sink realism drama film directed by Alvin Rakoff and starring Kenneth More, Cecil Parker, Dennis Price and Billie Whitelaw. It depicts the life of a struggling actor in Swinging London.

More later said that when he read the script he "was profoundly struck by its relevance to my own life, and to the lives of so many actors I had known." The film received limited distribution, being released on a double bill with Lord of the Flies (1963). It was More's last film as a film star, although he continued to star in stage plays and television.

== Plot ==
Sacked from his job in provincial rep, actor Chick Byrd moves into digs in London with Julian, a fellow actor. Julian's career soars after a successful screen test, but Chick's meets with continued failure. After the suicide of an actor friend, Jack Lavery, Chick is informed by his widow that just after Jack's death he was offered a job by Tommy Morris, an agent.

Chick contacts Tommy and takes Jack's job for a TV commercial. Chick finally finds fame when the commercial is a hit and he's signed for a series of commercials for breath mints. Confident of his talents for the first time, but fearing that he may have sold out, Chick leaves London to return to rep.

== Cast ==
- Kenneth More as Chick Byrd
- Cecil Parker as Thomas Rutherford
- Dennis Price as Tommy Morris
- Billie Whitelaw as Judy
- Norman Rossington as Theodore Littleton
- Angela Douglas as Fay Trubshaw
- Edmund Purdom as Julian Baxter
- Frank Finlay as Prout
- Alan Dobie as Jack Lavery
- J.G. Devlin as Sloppitt
- Valerie Croft as Yvonne
- Leila Croft as Pauline
- Gerald Campion as Gerry
- Jacqueline Hill as Sandy Lavery
- Harold Goodwin as assistant director
- Penny Morrell as actress
- Naomi Chance in a bit part
- Guy Deghy as Schuyster
- Derek Francis as Merryweather
- Myrtle Reed as Tommy's secretary
- Edwin Richfield as commercial director
- Gordon Rollings as Skippy
- Eileen Way as landlady
- Freddie Mills as Indian chief/Union steward
- Frank Thornton as producer
- John Horsley as co-pilot
- Wally Patch as bar manager
- Talitha Pol as actress at party
- Hamilton Dyce as burial minister
- Anthony Blackshaw as bus conductor
- Richard Pearson as advertising man
- Maurice Durant as barman
- Ronald Lacey as assistant director
- Jill Adams as Jan Kennedy
- Robert Raglan as man at party
- Alan Browning as actor at audition

== Production ==
Kenneth More wrote in his memoirs that he was not being offered any film scripts when he was sent this script by an American producer, Hal Chester. More later recalled: "I read the script and was profoundly struck by its relevance to my own life, and to the lives of so many actors I had known." More said that he took the part "against the advice of my agent, my friends, everybody. I even had to put money into the film. But it was worth it."

More did not get along with Hal Chester, who he felt cut important scenes from the film, but he enjoyed playing the role. During filming More had an affair with Angela Douglas, who plays his girlfriend in the film. He later left his wife to marry Douglas.

Filming took place in February and March 1963. More said that "the public won't accept me as a stevedore or as a Liverpool truck driver, so I've been prevented until now from making a realistic subject, although its something that I've been longing to do".

== Critical reception ==
The Monthly Film Bulletin wrote: "Good intentions, alas, are not enough. The story of The Comedy Man, with its downbeat, anti-romantic view of show business, though it is not new, still has its possibilities. But neither the director nor the scriptwriter seem to have seen them. The mood totters uneasily from farce (leaking roofs, lavatory jokes, witless running gags) to tragedy (Jack's suicide, his widow's grief, the funeral). The dialogue could have been left over from a second-rate play of the Thirties, and an attempt has been made to add the contemporary touch by sprinkling it with "bastards" and adding two of those irrelevant naked-between-the-sheets scenes which are now standard X certificate fare. Nevertheless, the film has solid assets in the impeccable performances of Kenneth More, Alan Dobie and a talented supporting cast, who obviously believed they were making a serious film about the integrity of their profession. It is a sad commentary on their faith that the most convincing moments are the television commercials whose earnest fatuity is exactly right."

According to Robin Karney, writing for Radio Times, the film was "written by Peter Yeldham with a nice balance between irony and drama, and directed by Alvin Rakoff with an accurate eye for the dingy environments and brave bonhomie of unemployed actors". It is a "modest British film" that "boasts a superior cast".

Allmovie wrote that "matching More's terrific starring performance are such British 'regulars' as Dennis Price, Billie Whitelaw, Cecil Parker, Norman Rossington and Frank Finlay".

The Sunday Mirror said that the film features "Kenneth More in the greatest performance of his career" and that it is "brilliantly directed".

Leslie Halliwell said: "Determinedly depressive satirical melodrama with engaging moments; comedy emphasis would have better suited the talents."
