= A Question of Suspense =

1961 British film by Max Varnel

- Directed by: Max Varnel
- Screenplay by: Lawrence Huntington
- Based on: an original story by Roy Vickers
- Produced by: Bill Luckwell; Jock MacGregor
- Starring: Peter Reynolds; Noelle Middleton; Yvonne Buckingham
- Cinematography: Philip Grindrod
- Edited by: Robert Hill
- Music by: Wilfred Burns
- Production companies: Bill & Michael Luckwell Limited
- Distributed by: Columbia Pictures
- Release date: 1961
- Running time: 63 mins

A Question of Suspense is a low budget 1961 British black and white crime drama "B" film directed by Max Varnel and starring Peter Reynolds, Noelle Middleton and Yvonne Buckingham. It was written by Lawrence Huntington from a story by Roy Vickers. It was one of several crime films starring Reynolds.

== Plot ==
James Tellman Drew is a businessman who has deposited £30,000 worth of forged bonds with his bank. When his chief clerk and childhood friend Frank Brigstock discovers the fraud, Drew offers him a partnership in his business, but lures him to a lonely spot by the coast and murders him and buries his body. Drew persuades the police that it was Frank who had been behind the scam and has absconded.

Rose Marples, who has been living with Frank as his wife, and has known both men since her youth, is not convinced. She begins her own investigation, ultimately discovering the burial site and bringing about Drew's demise.

== Cast ==
- Peter Reynolds as Tellman Drew
- Noelle Middleton as Rose Marples
- Yvonne Buckingham as Jean Forbes
- Norman Rodway as Frank Brigstock
- James Neylin as Inspector Hunter
- Pauline Delaney as Mrs. Barlow (as Pauiline Delany)
- Anne Mulvey as Sally
- Peter Dix as Det. Sergent White
- Fergus Cogley as bank manager
- Dennis Franks as estate agent
- John Hoey as hall porter

== Critical reception ==
Monthly Film Bulletin said "Thinly scripted murder-and-revenge melodrama, unexceptionally directed and working up to a tidy climax which was never in doubt for a moment."

The Daily Cinema noted on 26 June 1961 that the film "concentrates its drama on the characters and what makes them tick."

== Production ==
The 1968 Report of the Film Industry Committee shows that the Irish Film Finance Corporation had invested in the production of the film.

It was made at Ardmore Studios, Bray in Ireland. Although set in England, external scenes were filmed around Dublin and Greystones, including Frank Brigstock going to work on a CIÉ (Córas Iompair Éireann – Irish Transport Company) bus.
