= Murder in Eden (film) =

1961 British film by Max Varnel

- Theatrical release poster
- Directed by: Max Varnel
- Written by: H.E. Burden
- Based on: a story by John Haggarty
- Produced by: Bill Luckwell; Jock MacGregor
- Starring: Ray McAnally; Catherine Feller; Yvonne Buckingham
- Cinematography: Walter J. Harvey
- Edited by: Robert Jordan Hill (as Robert Hill)
- Music by: Wilfred Burns
- Production companies: Bill and Michael Luckwell Ltd.
- Distributed by: J. Arthur Rank Film Distributors (UK)
- Release date: 15 June 1961
- Running time: 63 minutes
- Country: United Kingdom
- Language: English

Murder in Eden is a 1961 British mystery film directed by Max Varnel and starring Ray McAnally, Catherine Feller and Yvonne Buckingham. It was written by H. E. Burden based on a story by John Haggarty.

An art critic is murdered and a reporter helps Scotland Yard hunt for the killer.

== Plot ==
The Woolf Art Gallery is promoting an exhibition of paintings under the title "The Garden of Eden". A man stares intently at a picture of Eve forming one of a pair representing Adam and Eve by a Dutch artist Van Meerwick. After he discovers a famous painting is fake, a noted art critic is killed by a hit-and-run driver. Inspector Peter Sharkey of Scotland Yard joins forces with French magazine reporter Geneviève Beaujean to investigate.

Geneviève spends a lot of time at the gallery. It is revealed she is not a real reporter. The police find a portfolio belonging to the dead man. It states the best forger is Michael Lucas but his work is revealed by the use of zinc white.

Michael Lucas has the real Eve hidden in a secret room in his seaside villa. He has promised to sell it to Bill Robson and shows him the secret room. Unknown to them, Geneviève listens to them chat from the secret room. She has a gun. The police arrive and hear her crying.

== Cast ==
- Ray McAnally as Inspector Peter Sharkey
- Catherine Feller as Geneviève Beaujean
- Yvonne Buckingham as Vicky Woolf
- Mark Singleton as Arnold Woolf
- Norman Rodway as Michael Lucas
- Jack Aranson as Bill Robson
- Robert Lepler as Max Aaronson
- Angela Douglas as beatnik
- Francis O'Keefe as Sergeant Johnson
- Noel Sheridan as Frenchman Jack
- Ronald Walsh as bodyguard
- John Sterling as art expert
- Frank O'Donovan as manservant
- Eithne Lydon as receptionist

== Critical reception ==
The Monthly Film Bulletin wrote: "What with unapt dialogue, tangled construction, melodramatic playing and unconvincing art work, direction as clumsy as is Max Varnel's here could scarcely make matters worse. The thinly disguised Irish accents of many of the cast and the wholesale use of Georgian Dublin exteriors for a thriller ostensibly set in London add an extra layer of unreality to the bogus art world portrayed."

Kine Weekly wrote: "The picture puts a routine crime tale in a new frame, or rather environment, and the fresh perspective gives a pristine kick to time-honoured romance and rough stuff. Catherine Feller is a pert and disarming Genevieve, Ray McAnally makes a doughty Sharkey, and Norman Rodway has his moments as Lucas. The supporting players also convince. Its backgrounds are elegant, the dialogue is apt, and it has a catchy musical score."
