= David Shipman (writer) =

English film critic and writer (1932–1996)

- Born: David Herbert Shipman; 4 November 1932; Norwich, Norfolk, England
- Died: 22 April 1996 (aged 63); Overton, Hampshire, England
- Occupations: Writer, biographer, film critic

David Herbert Shipman (4 November 1932 – 22 April 1996) was an English film critic and writer best known for his book trilogy The Great Movie Stars and his book duology The Story of Cinema. He was described in an obituary as "the most influential writer on film in the world".

== Biography ==
Shipman was born in Norwich, Norfolk, After a period in London, the family was evacuated in 1940 to Pensilva, Cornwall. He did his national service in the RAF, partly in Singapore, then briefly attended Merton College, Oxford. He worked as a publishing sales representative from 1955 to 1965, mostly in Europe, then returned to work for the UK publisher Thames & Hudson.

In 1968, Shipman began work on a first book, The Great Movie Stars: The Golden Years, which was published two years later and sold well. He also worked as a lecturer, journalist and film consultant, and from 1986 until his death wrote obituaries for The Independent newspaper.

Shipman died of a heart attack aged 63 in Overton, Hampshire. At the time, he was writing a biography of Fred Astaire. He was survived by his partner since 1964, the art director Felix Brenner.

Richard Cohen, writing Shipman's obituary for The Independent, stated:

For over a quarter of a century David Shipman was the most influential writer on film in the world. He was never [a] film critic for a national newspaper, and was generally not seen by the cinema establishment as a heavyweight; but in the 10 books he wrote, most notably the three volumes that made up The Great Movie Stars and the two-volume The Story of Cinema, he exerted an influence no other writer on film has matched. More widely read than Pauline Kael, more authoritative and more knowledgeable than Leslie Halliwell, he always seemed in touch with the audiences for whom he wrote, and they appreciated his strongly held if iconoclastic views and the fact he was always his own man.

== Select writings ==
- The Great Movie Stars: The Golden Years (1970 1st ed., revised in 1979, 1985 and 1995)
- The Great Movie Stars: The International Years (1972 1st ed., revised 1980 and 1991)
- Brando (1974) – a biography of Marlon Brando
- The Story of Cinema (1982/1984)
- The Good Film and Video Guide (1984 1st ed)
- Caught in the Act: Sex and Eroticism in the Movies (1985)
- Movie Talk: Who Said What About Whom in the Movies (1989)
- The Great Movie Stars: The Independent Years (1991 1st ed)
- Cinema: The First Hundred Years (1993)
- Judy Garland: The Secret Life of an American Legend (1993)
