= Oil Strike North =

BBC television drama series

- Genre: Drama
- Created by: Gerard Glaister
- Starring: Nigel Davenport; Glyn Owen; Barbara Shelley; Angela Douglas
- Country of origin: United Kingdom
- Original language: English
- No. of series: 1
- No. of episodes: 13

Production
- Producer: Gerard Glaister
- Production company: BBC

Original release
- Network: BBC1
- Release: 26 August – 18 November 1975

Oil Strike North is a BBC television drama series produced in 1975.

The series was created and produced by Gerard Glaister and dealt with life on Nelson One, a North Sea oil rig owned by the fictional company Triumph Oil. Eschewing the corporate power struggles of Mogul / The Troubleshooters and concentrating on more personal storylines, Oil Strike North was essentially a character study of how workers faced life on the rig and the impact it had on the lives of their families and loved ones.

Oil Strike North lasted for one series of thirteen episodes. Gerard Glaister later moved on to produce the Second World War resistance drama Secret Army, the air freight series Buccaneer and then onto the boating soap serial Howards' Way. Two of the leading actors in Oil Strike North, Nigel Davenport and Glyn Owen, also later appeared in Howards' Way.

The scenario was later revived by the BBC for the mid-1990s drama Roughnecks.

== Cast ==
- Nigel Davenport - Jim Fraser
- Glyn Owen - Jack Mullery
- Barbara Shelley - Elaine Smythe
- Angela Douglas - Julie Ward
- Michael Witney - Frank Ward
- Calum Mill - Angus Gallacher
- Angela Cheyne - Shona Campbell
- Andrew Robertson - Donald Cameron
- Richard Hurndall - Charles Wayman
- Sean Caffrey - Evans
- Maurice Roëves - McGraw

== Episodes ==
No.	Title	Directed by	Written by	Original release date
1	"Deadline"	Peter Cregeen	Ken Hughes	26 August 1975

- "Quiet Day"
- "Storm Clouds"
- "First Lion"
- "The Decision"
- "The Floating Bomb"
- "It Depends Where You Stand"
- "Shore Leave"
- "Workhorse"
- "Time of Hazard"
- "Headhunters"
- "The Fatal Hours (part 1)"
- "The Fatal Hours (part 2)"
