= Bill Luckwell =

British film producer and screenwriter (1913–1967)

- Born: 1 October 1913; Badminton, Gloucestershire, United Kingdom
- Died: 2 February 1967 (aged 53); London
- Occupations: Screenwriter, Producer
- Years active: 1955–1964 (production)

Bill Luckwell (1 October 1913 – 2 February 1967) was a British film producer and screenwriter. He founded Bill Luckwell Productions to make supporting features.

== Selected filmography ==
Producer

- Miss Tulip Stays the Night (1955)
- See How They Run (1955)
- Not So Dusty (1956)
- West of Suez (1957)
- The Crooked Sky (1957)
- Undercover Girl (1958)
- The Hand (1960)
- A Question of Suspense (1961)
- Murder in Eden (1961)
- Ambush in Leopard Street (1962)
- Breath of Life (1963)
- Delayed Flight (1964)

== Bibliography ==
- Chibnall, Steve & McFarlane, Brian. The British 'B' Film. Palgrave MacMillan, 2011.
