= Kenneth More =

British actor (1914–1982)

Kenneth More CBE
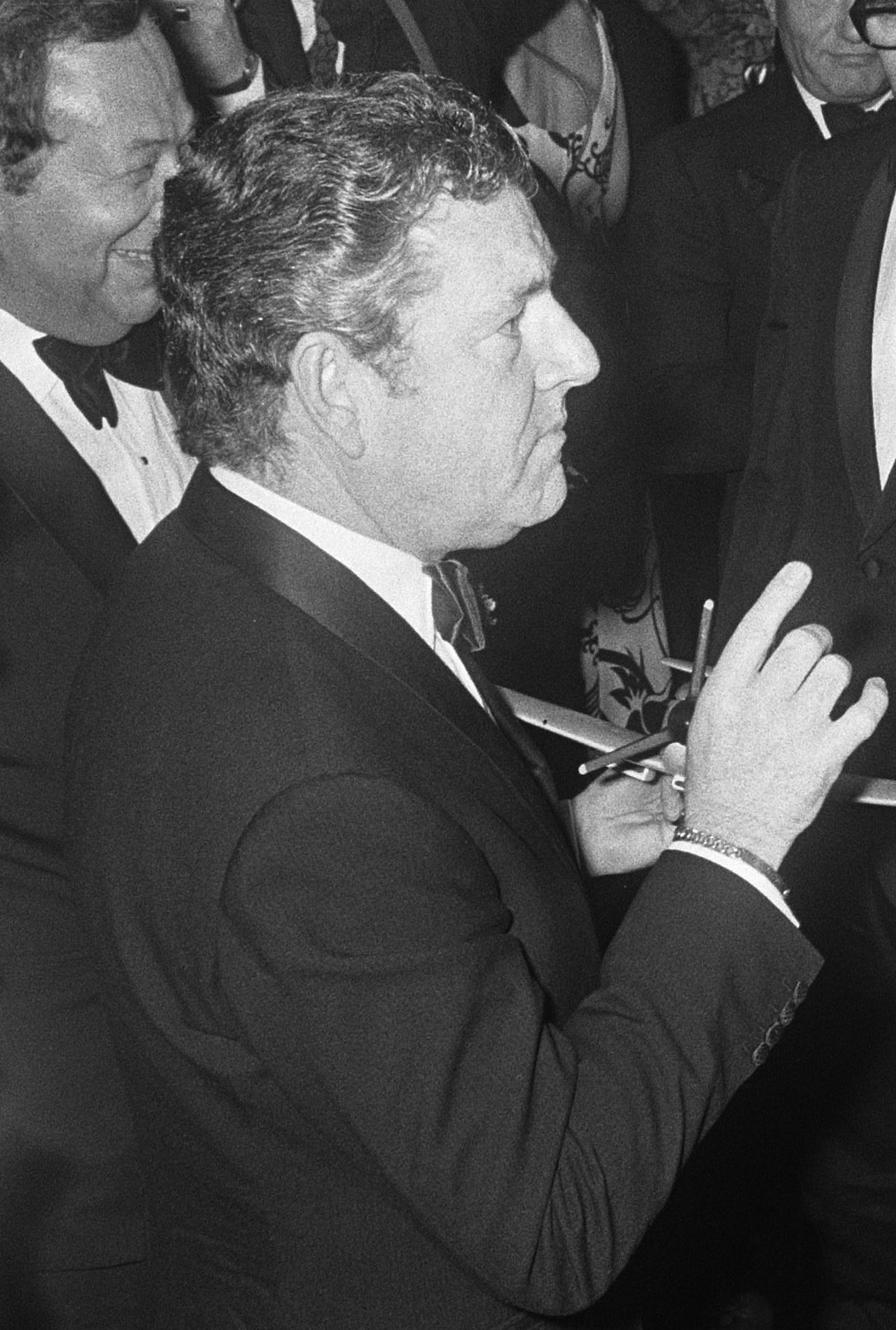
- More in 1969
- Born: Kenneth Gilbert More; 20 September 1914; Gerrards Cross, Buckinghamshire, England
- Died: 12 July 1982 (aged 67); Fulham, London, England
- Other name: Kenny More
- Occupation: Actor
- Years active: 1935–1980
- Spouses: Beryl Johnstone (m. 1939; div. 1946) Mabel Barkby (m. 1952; div. 1968) Angela Douglas (m. 1968)
- Children: 2

Kenneth Gilbert More (20 September 1914 – 12 July 1982) was an English actor.

Initially achieving fame in the comedy Genevieve (1953), More appeared in many roles as a carefree, happy-go-lucky gent. His films from this period include Doctor in the House (1954), Raising a Riot (1955), The Admirable Crichton (1957), The Sheriff of Fractured Jaw (1958) and Next to No Time (1958). He also played more serious roles as a leading man, beginning with The Deep Blue Sea (1955), Reach for the Sky (1956), A Night to Remember (1958), North West Frontier (1959), The 39 Steps (1959) and Sink the Bismarck! (1960).

Although More's career declined in the early 1960s, two of his own favourite films date from this time – The Comedy Man (1964) and The Greengage Summer (1961) with Susannah York, "one of the happiest films on which I have ever worked." He also enjoyed a revival in the much-acclaimed TV adaptation of The Forsyte Saga (1967) and the Father Brown series (1974).

== Early life ==
Kenneth More was born at 'Raeden', Vicarage Way, Gerrards Cross, Buckinghamshire, the only son of Charles Gilbert More, a Royal Naval Air Service pilot, and Edith Winifred Watkins, the daughter of a Cardiff solicitor. He was educated at Victoria College, Jersey, having spent part of his childhood in the Channel Islands, where his father was general manager of the Jersey Eastern Railway.

After his graduation, More followed the family tradition by training to become a civil engineer. However, he abandoned his training and worked for a while in Sainsbury's on the Strand.

When More was 17 his father died, and he applied to join the Royal Air Force but failed the medical test for equilibrium. He then travelled to Canada, intending to work as a fur trapper, but was sent back to Britain because he lacked immigration documents.

=== Windmill Theatre ===
On his return from Canada, a business associate of his father, Vivian Van Damm, agreed to offer him work as a stagehand at the Windmill Theatre, where his job included shifting scenery and helping to get the nude players off stage during its Revudeville variety shows. After a chance moment on stage helping a comic, he realized that he wanted to act and was soon promoted to playing straight man in the Revudeville comedy routines, appearing in his first sketch in August 1935.

He played there for a year, which then led to regular work in repertory, including Newcastle, performing in plays such as Burke and Hare and Dracula's Daughter. Other stage appearances included Do You Remember? (1937), Stage Hands Never Lie (1937) and Distinguished Gathering (1937).

More continued his theatre work until the outbreak of the Second World War in 1939. He had an occasional small role in films such as Look Up and Laugh (1935).

=== Second World War ===
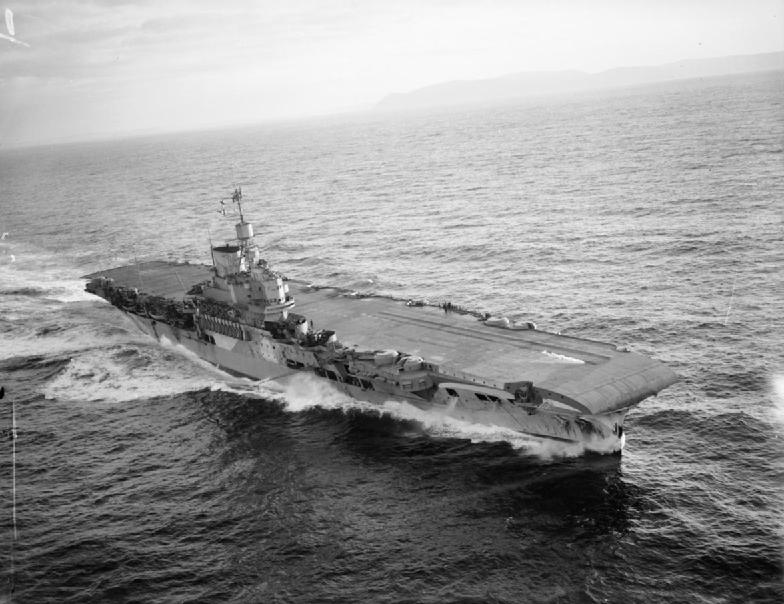
HMS Victorious, on which More saw service during the Second World War

Before the war, More was working as an actor in Wolverhampton at the repertory company and living at 166 Waterloo Road. According to the 1939 register, he was also ambulance driver number 207 in preparation for the outbreak of war. More received a commission as a sub-lieutenant in the Royal Naval Volunteer Reserve and saw active service aboard the cruiser HMS Aurora and the aircraft carrier HMS Victorious, ending the war as a lieutenant.

=== Resumption of acting career ===
On demobilisation in 1946 More resumed work at the Wolverhampton repertory company, then appeared on stage in the West End in And No Birds Sing (1946).

More appeared in Paul Vercors' play The Silence of the Sea broadcast on the day British TV recommenced after the war – 7 June 1946 – and this was followed by a number of television roles including Badger in an adaptation of Toad of Toad Hall (1946), and a small role in the film School for Secrets (1946). He was seen by Noël Coward playing a small role on stage in Power Without Glory (1947), which led to his casting in Coward's Peace In Our Time (1948) on stage.

More's earliest small roles in films date from before the war, but around this time, he began to appear regularly on the big screen. For a small role in Scott of the Antarctic (1948) as Edward Evans, 1st Baron Mountevans, he was paid £500. He thought this film would launch him more than it did and held off from accepting other roles, which resulted in his "nearly starving". He took minor parts in Man on the Run (1949), Now Barabbas (1949), and Stop Press Girl (1949).

== Stardom ==
=== Rising reputation ===
More achieved a notable stage success in The Way Things Go (1950) with Ronald Squire, from whom More later said he learned his stage technique.

He was in demand for minor roles on screen such as Morning Departure (1950) and Chance of a Lifetime (1950). More had a good part as a British agent in The Clouded Yellow (1950) for Ralph Thomas.

He could also be seen in The Franchise Affair (1951) and The Galloping Major (1951). More's first Hollywood-financed film was No Highway in the Sky (1951) where he played a co-pilot. Thomas cast him in another strong support part in Appointment with Venus (1952).

More's name was placed above the title billing for the first time with a low budget comedy, Brandy for the Parson (1952), playing a smuggler.

=== The Deep Blue Sea ===
Roland Culver recommended More audition for a part in a new play by Terence Rattigan, The Deep Blue Sea (1952); he was successful and achieved tremendous critical acclaim in the role of Freddie. More later wrote "Critics hailed me almost as an overnight discovery, conveniently forgetting I was already thirty-eight, and that I had been working in the theatre for nearly twenty years."

During the play's run he appeared as a worried parent in a thriller, The Yellow Balloon (1953). He was in another Hollywood-financed film, Never Let Me Go (1953), playing a colleague of Clark Gable.

=== Film stardom: Genevieve and Doctor in the House ===
Director Henry Cornelius approached More during the run of The Deep Blue Sea and offered him £3,500 to play one of the four leads in a comedy, Genevieve (1953) (a part turned down by Guy Middleton). More said Cornelius never saw him in the play but cast him on the basis of his work in The Galloping Major. More recalls "the shooting of the picture was hell. Everything went wrong, even the weather." However, the resulting film was a huge success at the British box office.

More next made Our Girl Friday (1953) and Doctor in the House (1954), the latter for Ralph Thomas. Both films were made before the release of Genevieve so More's fee was relatively small. Our Girl Friday was a commercial disappointment but Doctor in the House was the biggest hit at the 1954 British box office, and the most successful film in the history of Rank. More received a BAFTA Award as best newcomer.

More appeared in a TV production of The Deep Blue Sea in 1954, which was seen by an audience of 11 million. He signed a five-year contract with Sir Alexander Korda at £10,000 a year. '

He was now established as one of Britain's biggest stars and Korda announced plans to feature him in two films based on true stories, one, The Alcock and Brown Story about the Transatlantic flight of Alcock and Brown in 1919 also featuring Denholm Elliott, and the other Clifton James, the double for Field Marshal Montgomery. The first film was never made and the second, I Was Monty's Double, used another actor. Korda also wanted More to star in a new version of The Four Feathers, Storm Over the Nile (1956) but he turned it down.

However, More did accept Korda's offer to appear in a film adaptation of The Deep Blue Sea (1955), gaining the Best Actor at the Venice Film Festival for his performance. The film was something of a critical and commercial disappointment (More felt Vivien Leigh was miscast in the lead) but still widely seen. He also did the narration for Korda's The Man Who Loved Redheads (1955).

When The Alcock and Brown Story was cancelled, More was reassigned to another film for Korda, the domestic comedy Raising a Riot (1955), directed by Wendy Toye. It was the eighth most popular movie at the British box office in 1955, and much of the film's success was attributed to More's appeal.

=== Reach for the Sky ===
More received an offer from David Lean to play the lead role in an adaptation of The Wind Cannot Read by Richard Mason. More was unsure about whether the public would accept him in such a straightforwardly romantic part and refused it, a decision he later regarded as "the greatest mistake I ever made professionally". Lean dropped the project and was not involved in the eventual 1958 film version, which starred Dirk Bogarde and was directed by Ralph Thomas.

Instead, More played the Royal Air Force fighter ace, Douglas Bader, in Reach for the Sky (1956), a part refused by Richard Burton. It was the most popular British film of the year. By 1956, More's asking price was £25,000 a film. In October 1956, John Davis, managing director of Rank, announced him as one of the actors under contract to Rank that Davis thought would become an international star.

More received offers to go to Hollywood, but refused them, unsure his persona would be effective there. However, he started working with U.S. co-stars and directors more often. In February 1957, he signed a contract with Daniel M. Angel and was to make ten films over five years, seven which would be distributed by Rank and three by 20th Century Fox. In June of that year, he said:

Hollywood has been hitting two extremes – either a Biblical de Mille spectacular or a Baby Doll. Britain does two other kinds of movie as well as anyone – a certain type of high comedy and a kind of semi-documentary. I believe we (the British film industry) should hit these hard.

His next film, The Admirable Crichton (1957), was a high comedy, based on the play by J. M. Barrie. It was released by Columbia Pictures. It was directed by Lewis Gilbert who also had made Reach for the Sky and who later said:

I was very fond of Kenny as an actor, although he wasn't particularly versatile. What he could do, he did very well. His strengths were his ability to portray charm; basically he was the officer returning from the war and he was superb in that kind of role. The minute that kind of role went out of existence, he began to go down as a box office star.

Regarding his performance in this film, critic David Shipman wrote:

It was not just that he had superb comic timing: one could see absolutely why the family trusted their fates to him. No other British actor had come so close to that dependable, reliable quality of the great Hollywood stars – you would trust him through thick and thin. And he was more humorous than, say, Cary Grant, more down-to-earth than, say, Gary Cooper.

The Admirable Crichton was the third most popular movie at the British box office in 1957. Josh Billings of Kinematograph Weekly wrote that More was the only star in Britain who could draw audiences solely on the power of his name.

In 1957, More had announced that he would play the lead role of a captain caught up in the Indian Mutiny in Night Runners of Bengal but the film was never made. More refused an offer from Roy Ward Baker to play a German POW in The One That Got Away (1957), but agreed to play the lead role of Charles Lightoller in the Titanic film for the same director, A Night to Remember (1958). This was the first of a seven-year contract with Rank at a fee of £40,000 a film. It was popular though failed to recover its large cost; it was one of More's most critically acclaimed films.

For his next film, More had an American co-star Betsy Drake, Next to No Time (1958) directed by Cornelius. It was a minor success at the box office.

More then made The Sheriff of Fractured Jaw (1958), a Western spoof originally written for Clifton Webb. He had an American director (Raoul Walsh) and co-star (Jayne Mansfield), although the film was shot in Spain. It was the tenth most-popular movie at the British box office in 1958.

In December 1958 More announced he had a contract with Rank to make seven films in five years at a flat salary (of which the first was Night to Remember), plus three films in five years for Dan Angel and 20th Century Fox of which Sheriff was the first. He also said he would no longer make a film without an American co star.

More said he had been offered a production deal of his own releasing through British Lion but did not want to do it saying "I've got what I want, and I've never been lucky in business anyway. I think too many actors also try to be their own administrators these days, and I see them walking around with worried faces. Some people have the flair for it, of course. I don't."

More said he would not appear on television. "If I do, it'll kill the theatre business that night. That's true of any big actor in Britain today. It was terrible what happened to the theatres the night Laurence Olivier went on. : Nobody went. So people like myself stay off television, though they offer fantastic sums. I was offered £123,000 (about $640,000) to appear in one television series; and most of that money would have been tax-free in one way or another."

More made another film with Ralph Thomas, a remake of The 39 Steps (1959), with a Hollywood co star (Taina Elg). It was a hit in Britain.

He appeared in a Fox-Rank film set in India, North West Frontier (1959), co-starring Lauren Bacall and directed by J. Lee Thompson. It was another success in Britain but not in the US. He agreed to star in The Angry Silence at a discount fee but pulled out in order to make Sink the Bismarck! (1960), directed by Gilbert, a more lucrative assignment (More's role was played by Richard Attenborough). This film was a hit in Britain and the US.

More was the subject of This Is Your Life in 1959 when he was surprised by Eamonn Andrews at the Odeon Cinema, Shepherd's Bush.

== Later career ==
=== Decline in film popularity ===
In 1960, Rank's Managing Director John Davis gave permission for More to work outside his contract to appear in The Guns of Navarone (1961). More, however, made the mistake of heckling and swearing at Davis at a BAFTA dinner at the Dorchester, losing the role (which went to David Niven).

More went on to make a comedy, Man In The Moon (1960), which flopped at the box office, "his first real flop" since becoming a star, according to Shipman. He returned to the stage directing The Angry Deep in Brighton in 1960.

More and Gilbert were reunited on The Greengage Summer (1961) which remains one of More's favourite films, although Gilbert felt the star was miscast.

He returned to military roles as one of many stars in The Longest Day (1962) playing Beachmaster Captain Colin Maud, and then he played the lead in a comedy produced by Daniel Angel and directed by Wendy Toyes, We Joined the Navy (1962), which was poorly received.

More says he accepted the lead in the low-budget youth film, Some People (1962), because he had no other offers at the time. The movie was profitable.

Some felt More's popularity declined when he left his second wife to live with Angela Douglas who had been in the cast of Some People. Others argued his appeal was simply becoming out of date. Film writer Andrew Spicer thought that "More's persona was so strongly associated with traditional middle class values that his stardom could not survive the shift towards working class iconoclasts" during that decade. Another writer, Christopher Sandford, felt that "as the sixties began and the star of the ironic, postmodernist school rose, More was derided as a ludicrous old fogey with crinkly hair and a tweed jacket."

He returned to television with the lead in Heart to Heart written by Terence Rattigan. More received an offer to star in The Comedy Man directed by Alvin Rakoff, but the film was not released for two years. More then made Collect Your Hand Luggage (1963) for television directed by Ted Kotcheff.

He was going to star in a film about the Cyprus Emergency called The Cyprus Story, playing an intelligence officer who falls in love with Elsa Martinelli who plays the daughter of an EOKA sympathiser. Pre-production was difficult - director Robert Day quit and was replaced by Roy Baker, however filming, which was to start in June 1963 in Cyprus, did not proceed.

More went back to the stage, appearing in Out of the Crocodile (1963) and Our Man Crichton (1964–65), which ran for six months. He also appeared in a small screen version of Simon Raven's The Scapegoat.

He appeared in a 35-minute prologue to The Collector (1965) at the special request of director William Wyler, but it ended up being removed entirely from the final film.

=== Revival ===
More's popularity recovered in the 1960s through West End stage performances and television roles, especially following his success in The Forsyte Saga (1967). Critic David Shipman said More's personal notices for his performance on stage in The Secretary Bird (1968) "must be among the best accorded any light comedian during this century".

On screen More had a small role in Dark of the Sun (1968) and a bigger one in Fräulein Doktor (1969). He was one of many names in Oh! What a Lovely War (1969) and Battle of Britain (1969). He took the role of the Ghost of Christmas Present in Scrooge (1970) and had long stage runs with a revival of The Winslow Boy (1970) and Getting On by Alan Bennett (1971).

He was appointed a Commander of the Order of the British Empire (CBE) in the 1970 New Year Honours.

=== Later career ===
More's later stage appearances included Signs of the Times (1973) and On Approval (1977). He played the title character in ATV's Father Brown (1974) series.

His later film roles included The Slipper and the Rose (1976), Where Time Began (1977), Leopard in the Snow (1978), An Englishman's Castle (1978) and Unidentified Flying Oddball (1979).

== Personal life ==
More was married three times. His first marriage in 1940 to actress Mary Beryl Johnstone (one daughter, Susan Jane, born 1941) ended in divorce in 1946. He married Mabel Edith "Bill" Barkby in 1952 (one daughter, Sarah, born 1954) but left her in 1968 for Angela Douglas, an actress 26 years his junior, causing considerable estrangement from family and friends. He was married to Douglas, who he nicknamed "Shrimp", from 17 March 1968 until his death in 1982.

More wrote two autobiographies, Happy Go Lucky (1959) and More or Less (1978). In the second book, he related how he had since childhood, a recurrent dream of something akin to a huge wasp descending towards him. During the war, he had experienced a German Stuka dive-bomber descending in just such a manner. After that, he claimed never to have had that dream again. Producer Daniel M. Angel successfully sued More for libel in 1980, over comments made in his second autobiography. More subsequently recounted that the libel suit, which he said had stemmed from "innocently" using "the wrong words to describe an event in my life", had a negative effect on his health and brought him to the verge of a nervous breakdown.

== Illness and death ==
More and Douglas separated for several years during the 1970s, but reunited when he was diagnosed with Parkinson's disease. This made it increasingly difficult for him to work, although his last role was a sizeable supporting part in a US TV adaptation of A Tale of Two Cities (1980). In 1980, when he was being sued by producer Daniel M. Angel for comments in his memoirs, he told the court he was retired.

In 1981, he wrote:

Doctors and friends ask me how I feel. How can you define "bloody awful?" My nerves are stretched like a wire; the simplest outing becomes a huge challenge – I have to have Angela's arm to support me most days... my balance or lack of it is probably my biggest problem. My blessings are my memories and we have a few very loyal friends who help us through the bad days... Financially all's well. Thank goodness my wife, who holds nothing of the past over my head, is constantly at my side. Real love never dies. We share a sense of humour which at times is vital. If I have a philosophy it is that life doesn't put everything your way. It takes a little back. I strive to remember the ups rather than the downs. I have a lot of time with my thoughts these days and sometimes they hurt so much I can hardly bear it. However, my friends always associate me with the song: "When You're Smiling..." lt isn't always easy but I'm trying to live up to it.

More died on 12 July 1982, aged 67. It is now believed that he had been suffering from multiple system atrophy (MSA), a belief due in part to the age of onset and the speed at which the condition progressed. He was cremated at Putney Vale Crematorium and a plaque erected at the actors' church St Paul's, Covent Garden, following a memorial attended by family, friends and colleagues.

== Legacy ==
The Kenneth More Theatre, named in honour of the actor, was founded in 1975, in Ilford, east London.

A plaque commemorates More at 27 Rumbold Road, Fulham, his home at the time of his death. Another memorial plaque was installed at the Duchess Theatre in London's West End (where More gave his acclaimed performance as Freddie Page in a production of Terence Rattigan's The Deep Blue Sea).

== Filmography ==
- Look Up and Laugh (1935) (bit part, uncredited)
- Carry On London (1937) (bit part, uncredited)
- The Silence of the Sea (1946, TV movie) as The German
- School for Secrets (1946) as Bomb Aimer (uncredited)
- Toad of Toad Hall (1946, TV movie) as Mr. Badger
- Scott of the Antarctic (1948) as Lt. E.G.R.(Teddy) Evans R.N.
- Man on the Run (1949) as Corp. Newman the Blackmailer
- Now Barabbas (1949) as Spencer
- Stop Press Girl (1949) as Police Sgt. 'Bonzo'
- For Them That Trespass – (1949) – Prison Warder
- Morning Departure (1950) as Lieut. Cmdr. James
- Chance of a Lifetime (1950) as Adam
- The Clouded Yellow (1951) as Willy Shepley
- The Franchise Affair (1951) as Stanley Peters
- The Galloping Major (1951) as Rosedale Film Studio Director
- No Highway in the Sky (1951) Dobson, Co-Pilot (uncredited)
- Appointment with Venus (1951) as Lionel Fallaize
- Brandy for the Parson (1952) as Tony Rackhman
- The Yellow Balloon (1953) as Ted
- Never Let Me Go (1953) as Steve Quillan
- Genevieve (1953) as Ambrose Claverhouse
- Our Girl Friday (1953) as Pat Plunkett
- Doctor in the House (1954) as Richard Grimsdyke
- The Deep Blue Sea (1954, BBC, TV movie) as Freddie Page
- The Man Who Loved Redheads (1955) as Narrator
- Raising a Riot (1955) as Tony Kent
- The Deep Blue Sea (1955) as Freddie Page
- Reach for the Sky (1956) as Douglas Bader
- The Admirable Crichton (1957) as Bill Crichton
- A Night to Remember (1958) as Second Officer Charles Herbert Lightoller
- Next to No Time (1958) as David Webb
- The Sheriff of Fractured Jaw (1958) as Jonathan Tibbs
- The Thirty-Nine Steps (1959) as Richard Hannay
- North West Frontier (1959) as Captain Scott
- Sink the Bismarck! (1960) as Captain Shepard
- Man in the Moon (1960) as William Blood
- The Greengage Summer (1961) as Eliot
- Heart to Heart (1962, TV movie) as David Mann
- Some People (1962) as Mr. Smith
- The Longest Day (1962) as Captain Colin Maud
- We Joined the Navy (1962) as Lt. Cmdr. Robert Badger
- Collect Your Hand Baggage (1963) TV
- The Comedy Man (1964) as Chick Byrd
- The Scapegoat (1964) TV
- Old Soldiers (1964) TV
- The Collector (1965) (scenes deleted)
- Lord Raingo (1966, TV movie) as Sam Raingo
- The Sweet War Man (1966) TV
- Final Demand (1966) TV
- The Forsyte Saga (1967, TV series) as 'Young Jolyon' Forsyte
- The White Rabbit (1967, TV movie) as Wing Cmdr. Yeo-Thomas
- Dark of the Sun, also known as The Mercenaries (1968) as Doctor Wreid
- The Secretary Bird (1969) TV
- Fräulein Doktor (1969) as Col. Foreman
- Oh! What a Lovely War (1969) as Kaiser Wilhelm II
- Battle of Britain (1969) as Group Captain Barker
- Scrooge (1970) as Ghost of Christmas Present
- Father Brown (1974, TV series) as Father Brown
- The Slipper and the Rose: The Story of Cinderella (1976) as Chamberlain
- Where Time Began (1977) as Prof. Otto Linderbrock
- Leopard in the Snow (1978) as Sir Philip James
- An Englishman's Castle (1978, TV movie) as Peter Ingram
- The Spaceman and King Arthur (1979) as King Arthur
- A Tale of Two Cities (1980, TV movie) as Dr. Jarvis Lorry (final film role)

=== Unfilmed projects ===
- Adaptation of Nightrunners of Bengal (1957)
- The Angry Silence (1960) – turned down role eventually played by Richard Attenborough

== Selected theatre credits ==
- Windmill Theatre – 1935
- Do You Remember? – Barry O'Brien Touring Company, August–November 1937
- Stage Hands Never Lie by Olive Remple – November 1937
- Stage Distinguished Gathering by James Parish – Wimbledon Theatre, August 1937
- And No Birds Sing by Rev Arthur Platt – Aldwych Theatre, November 1946
- Power Without Glory – February–April 1947
- Peace In Our Time by Noël Coward – Lyric Theatre, July 1948
- The Way Things Go – Phoenix Theatre, May 1950
- The Deep Blue Sea by Terence Rattigan – Duchess Theatre, March 1952
- The Angry Deep – Brighton, January 1960 – Brighton – director only
- Out of the Crocodile – Phoenix Theatre, October 1963
- Our Man Crichton – Shaftesbury Theatre, December 1964 – ran six months
- The Secretary Bird – Savoy Theatre, October 1968
- The Winslow Boy by Terence Rattigan – New Theatre, November 1970 – ran nine months
- Getting On by Alan Bennett – Queen's Theatre, October 1971 – ran nine months
- Signs of the Times by Jeremy Kingston – Vaudeville Theatre, June 1973
- Kenneth More Requests the Pleasure of Your Company – Kenneth More Theatre, April 1977 – an evening of poetry, prose and music
- On Approval – Vaudeville Theatre, June 1977

== Writings ==
- Happy Go Lucky (1959)
- Kindly Leave the Stage (1965)
- More or Less (1978)

== Awards ==
- 1953 Nominated as Best British Actor (BAFTA) for Genevieve
- 1954 Won Best British Actor (BAFTA) for Doctor in the House
- 1955 Won Best Actor at Venice Film Festival for The Deep Blue Sea
- 1955 Won Most Promising International Star (Variety Club)
- 1955 Nominated Best British Actor (BAFTA) for The Deep Blue Sea
- 1956 Nominated Best British Actor (BAFTA) for Reach for the Sky
- 1956 Won Picturegoer Magazine Best Actor Award for Reach for the Sky
- 1970 appointed a CBE in the New Year's Honours
- 1974 Won TV Times Best Actor Award for Father Brown
- 1975 Recipient of silver heart for 40 Years in Showbusiness (Variety Club)

== Box office ranking ==
British exhibitors regularly voted More one of the most popular stars at the local box office in an annual poll conducted by the Motion Picture Herald:

- 1954 – 5th most popular British star
- 1955 – 5th most popular British star
- 1956 – most popular international star
- 1957 – 2nd most popular international star (NB another source said he was the most popular)
- 1958 – 3rd most popular international star
- 1959 – most popular British star
- 1960 – most popular international star
- 1961 – 3rd most popular international star
- 1962 – 4th most popular international star

== See also ==
- Cinema of the United Kingdom
- List of British actors
