= Gerald Campion =

English actor (1921–2002)

- Born: Gerald Theron Campion; 23 April 1921; Bloomsbury, London, England
- Died: 9 July 2002 (aged 81); Agen, Lot-et-Garonne, France
- Education: RADA
- Occupation: Actor
- Years active: 1938–1992
- Spouse(s): Jean Sherman (m. 1947; div. 1972) Susan Mark (m. 1973)
- Children: 3
- Parent: Cyril Campion

Gerald Theron Campion (23 April 1921 – 9 July 2002) was an English actor. He is best remembered for his role as Billy Bunter in a 1950s television adaptation (Billy Bunter of Greyfriars School) of books by Frank Richards (Charles Hamilton).

== Biography ==
His father Cyril Theron Campion (1894–1961) – a playwright and screenwriter – and Blanche Louise Tunstall née Bear (1890–1933) – a first cousin of Charlie Chaplin – married in 1920 in London. Campion was born in Bloomsbury, London, an only child.

He won a place at RADA at age 15, and appeared in numerous films and television programmes – mostly comedies. In 1937, he appeared in Tavs Neiiendam's radio play Inspiration to a Poet on the BBC Home Service.

His only major success was as Bunter, a juvenile role he played successfully despite being much older than his character (he was 40 when the series ended). Campion later reprised the role (now Lord Bunter of Hove, who had succeeded in betting shops and property) in the BBC Radio 7 series Whatever Happened to ...? in the episode that speculated on whether Bunter's form master at Greyfriars School, Horace Henry Samuel Quelch, became a secret agent.

He played Coatsleeve Charlie, in the very first epidode of Hancock's Half Hour, ' The First of the Series ', broadcast on 2nd. November, 1954.

In 1979, he recorded an appearance in Shada, a Doctor Who story which was not completed in its intended form.

After dropping out of acting, Campion ran clubs and restaurants in London's Soho, the best known of which is Gerry's, a long running private members' club attracting a mainly theatrical membership.

== Personal life ==
Campion's first marriage, to Jean M Sherman (Simmonds) (b. 1925) in London in 1947, ended in divorce in 1972. They had three children: Anthea (a singer who married composer Thomas Rajna); Anthony, born in 1948; and Angelica, born in 1962. His second marriage, to Susan (Suzie) Marks in 1973, ended with his death.

Campion lived in Wittersham, Kent for many years. He and his wife Suzie moved to France in 1991. He died in 2002 aged 81 in Agen, Aquitaine, France.

== Selected filmography ==
- The Drum (1938) – Soldier (uncredited)
- The Ghost of St. Michael's (1941) – Pupil at Rear of Class (uncredited)
- Take My Life (1947) – Newspaper Seller at Station (uncredited)
- Miranda (1948) – Lift Boy (uncredited)
- The Pickwick Papers (1952) – Joe, the Fat Boy
- Top of the Form (1953) – Pugley
- Knave of Hearts (1954) – Harry (uncredited)
- Up to His Neck (1954) – Skinny
- Fun at St. Fanny's (1956) – Fatty Gilbert
- Jumping for Joy (1956) – Man with Ice Cream (uncredited)
- Keep It Clean (1956) – Rasher
- Carry On Sergeant (1958) – Andy Galloway
- Inn for Trouble (1960) – George
- School for Scoundrels (1960) – Proudfoot
- Double Bunk (1961) – Charlie
- Jigsaw (1962) – Glazier (uncredited)
- The Fast Lady (1962) – Actor in Scottish TV show
- A Home of Your Own (1964)
- The Comedy Man (1964) – Gerry
- Those Magnificent Men in their Flying Machines (1965) – Fireman (uncredited)
- The Sandwich Man (1966) – Fred – Sandwich Man in Suit of Armour
- The Sorcerers (1967) – Customer in China Shop
- Half a Sixpence (1967) – Fat Boy
- Chitty Chitty Bang Bang (1968) – Minister
- Atlantic Wall (1970) – Clergyman 2
- The Six Napoleons from The Return of Sherlock Holmes (1986) – Morse Hudson
- Little Dorrit (1987) – Mr. Tetterby
- Just Ask for Diamond (1988) – Uncle Holly

== Sources ==
1. BFI (2018). "Gerald Campion". Archived from the original on 28 Aug 2018.
2. ComicsUK (4 Oct 2002). "Profile of Gerald Campion". Archived from the original on 4 Mar 2009.
3. Daily Telegraph (11 Jul 2002). "Gerald Campion". Archived from the original on 30 Oct 2014.
4. Campion, Angelica (9 Feb 2018). "My Dad, Gerald Campion". Hastings Independent Press. Archived from the original on 6 Sep 2018.
5. Robinson, David (1985). Chaplin: His Life And Art. McGraw-Hill. ISBN 978-0070531819.
