= Clifton Cathedral =

- The Cathedral Church of SS. Peter and Paul
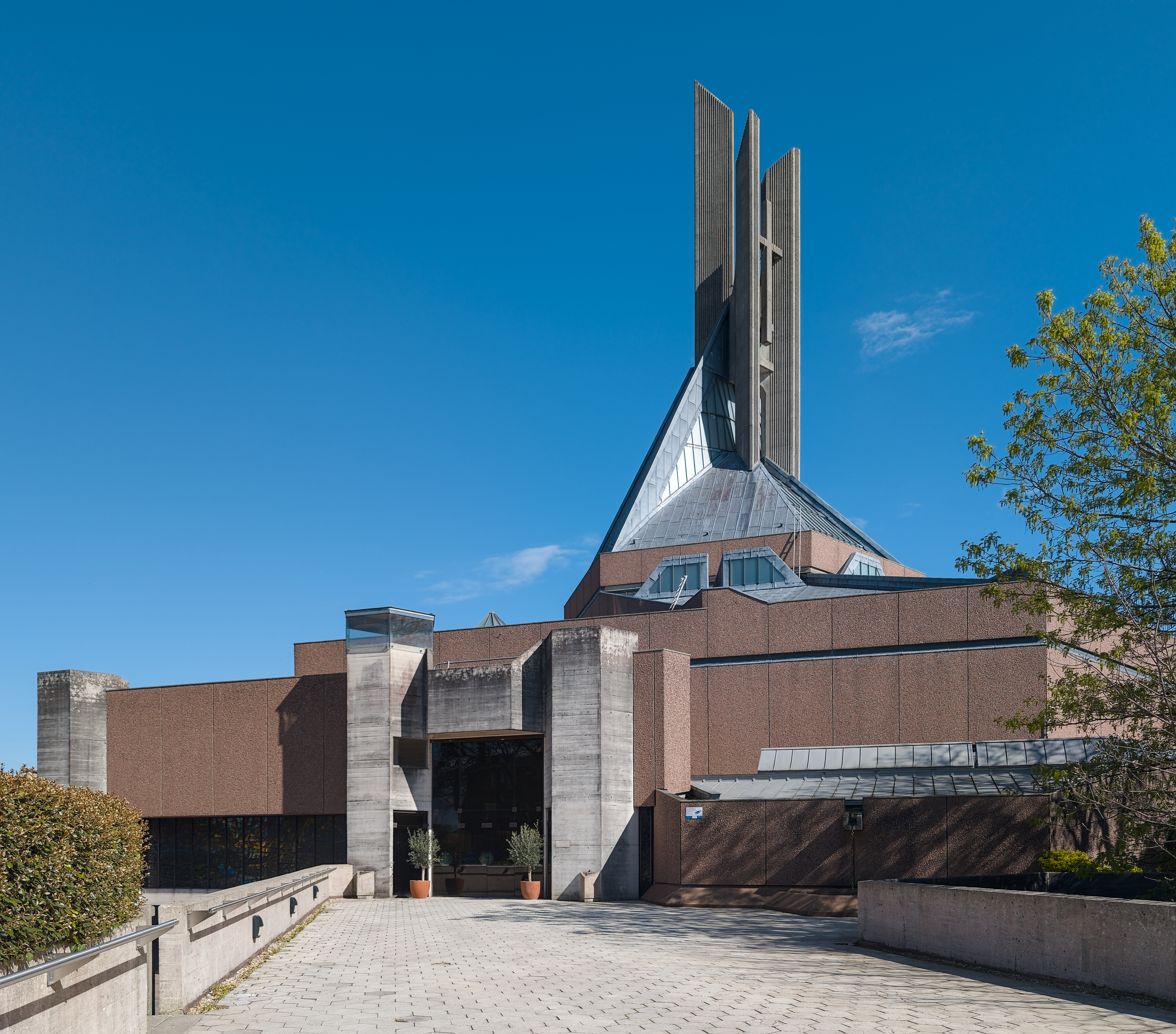

- Shown within Bristol
- 51°27′35″N 2°36′59″W
- OS grid reference: ST 57283 73587
- Location: Bristol, Bristol
- Country: England
- Denomination: Roman Catholic
- Website: www.cliftoncathedral.org

History
- Consecrated: 29 June 1973

Architecture
- Designated

Listed Building – Grade II*
- Official name: Cathedral Church of SS Peter and Paul
- Designated: 20 December 2000
- Reference no.: 1271209
- Architect(s): Ronald J. Weeks, Frederick S. Jennett and Antoni Poremba of Percy Thomas Partnership
- Architectural type: Modern – Late-Brutalist
- Years built: 1970–1973
- Groundbreaking: 1970
- Completed: 1973
- Construction cost: c. £800,000 (1973)

Specifications
- Capacity: 1000

Administration
- Province: Birmingham
- Archdiocese: Province of Birmingham
- Diocese: Clifton

Clergy
- Archbishop: Bernard Longley
- Bishop: Bosco MacDonald
- Dean: Canon Colin Mason

The Cathedral Church of SS. Peter and Paul is the Roman Catholic cathedral of the city of Bristol (not to be confused with the Church of England Bristol Cathedral). Located in the Clifton area of the city, it is the seat and mother church of the Diocese of Clifton and is known as Clifton Cathedral. It has been a Grade II* Listed Building since 2000. A 2014 study noted it to be the only Catholic church built in the 1970s to have been Grade II* listed. It was the first cathedral built under new guidelines arising from the Second Vatican Council.

== History ==
=== Pro-Cathedral of the Holy Apostles ===
Prior to the Roman Catholic Relief Act 1791 (31 Geo. 3. c. 32), Roman Catholics in Britain were banned from having public places of worship, and simply being a Catholic priest or running a Catholic school was liable to punishment with life imprisonment. By the time of Catholic Emancipation, and the passing of the Roman Catholic Relief Act 1829, Roman Catholics in Bristol had established a number of local places of worship, some of them in private houses, and in Clifton by the discreet purchase, through a third party, of a plot of land known as 'Stoney Fields' in what is now Park Place, Clifton. In 1834, the construction of a church began there, but it was built on a challenging hillside site and had a history of problematic construction work, making work there difficult. Building stopped 1835, started again in 1843, stopped shortly after and the building lay abandoned until 1848 when a roof was placed on the half-completed building so that it could be used as a church. Two years later, in 1850, Clifton was made an episcopal see and the church became the Pro-Cathedral of the Holy Apostles (1850–1973), intended to act in this capacity until a more fitting cathedral church could be constructed.

=== Move to Clifton Park ===
The people of the ProCathedral parish had raised some £250,000 (1970) for restoration of the ProCathedral. However, with reports from the civil engineers in 1964 indicating that the ProCathedral site in Park Place was unsuitable, an anonymous group of local people added to this a donation of £450,000 (1970), on the condition that a new site was found.

From 1962 to 1965 the Second Vatican Council met in Rome, discussing the renewal of the Church in its relationship to the world. The council's decree on liturgical worship focused on the role of the people, with the bishop and their priests in the celebration of the Eucharist. This was to be a strong influence in the design of the new Cathedral and, when built, the cathedral would be the first worldwide to be designed following the new guidelines.

In 1965, architects were commissioned by the Bishop of Clifton, Rt Rev Joseph Rudderham to undertake the design of a new Cathedral on a different site in Clifton. The design was primarily by Ronald J. Weeks, working with Frederick S. Jennett and Antoni Poremba of the Percy Thomas Partnership. Although the firm had little experience in ecclesiastical architecture, Ronald Weeks had contributed a design to the competition for Liverpool Metropolitan Cathedral, and had worked on a new Catholic church in Machynlleth.

== Design ==
=== The design brief ===
The design brief was for a 1,000-seat church, with the congregation grouped closely around the High Altar so that they should feel and be a part of the celebration of the Mass, in a building that would last 300 years. Ronald Weeks worked closely with the Church team to develop their ideas for the cathedral. 'We are sure that only...a close working relationship between Architect and Client can achieve the level of 'Architectural Seriousness' advanced by the New Liturgical Movement.' Although Weeks was not a Catholic, he thought that this was an advantage: 'It's surprising how much people take for granted. Not being Catholics we could ask all sorts of questions which appeared naïve – like – "What is an altar?", in which one would get conflicting answers... each question would lead to a discussion which in turn helped to banish pre-conceived notions so we could plan right from scratch.'

As Kulić puts it: 'The approach of Gibberd [at Liverpool] and Weeks were therefore quite different. Gibberd took on the role of art-architect in response to a lack of direction from the client. Weeks's role was more that of a coordinator of the client's requirements, weaving them into a hierarchical and meaningful whole...Weeks was more in tune with the collaborative sociological methods that had been adopted...in the immediate post-war period.'

Kulić, comparing the design to that of Liverpool Metropolitan Cathedral (completed 1967), said: 'Neither its bishop nor its architects appeared to wish to use architecture as a way of leaving a mark for posterity, as did both Heenon and Gibberd [at Liverpool]...Liverpool could be proved to be liturgically conservative and naïvely designed, while Clifton could be seen as a model of liturgically advanced and sophisticated planning...Weeks and the Clifton clergy...should be praised for their intimate and knowledgeable collaboration.'

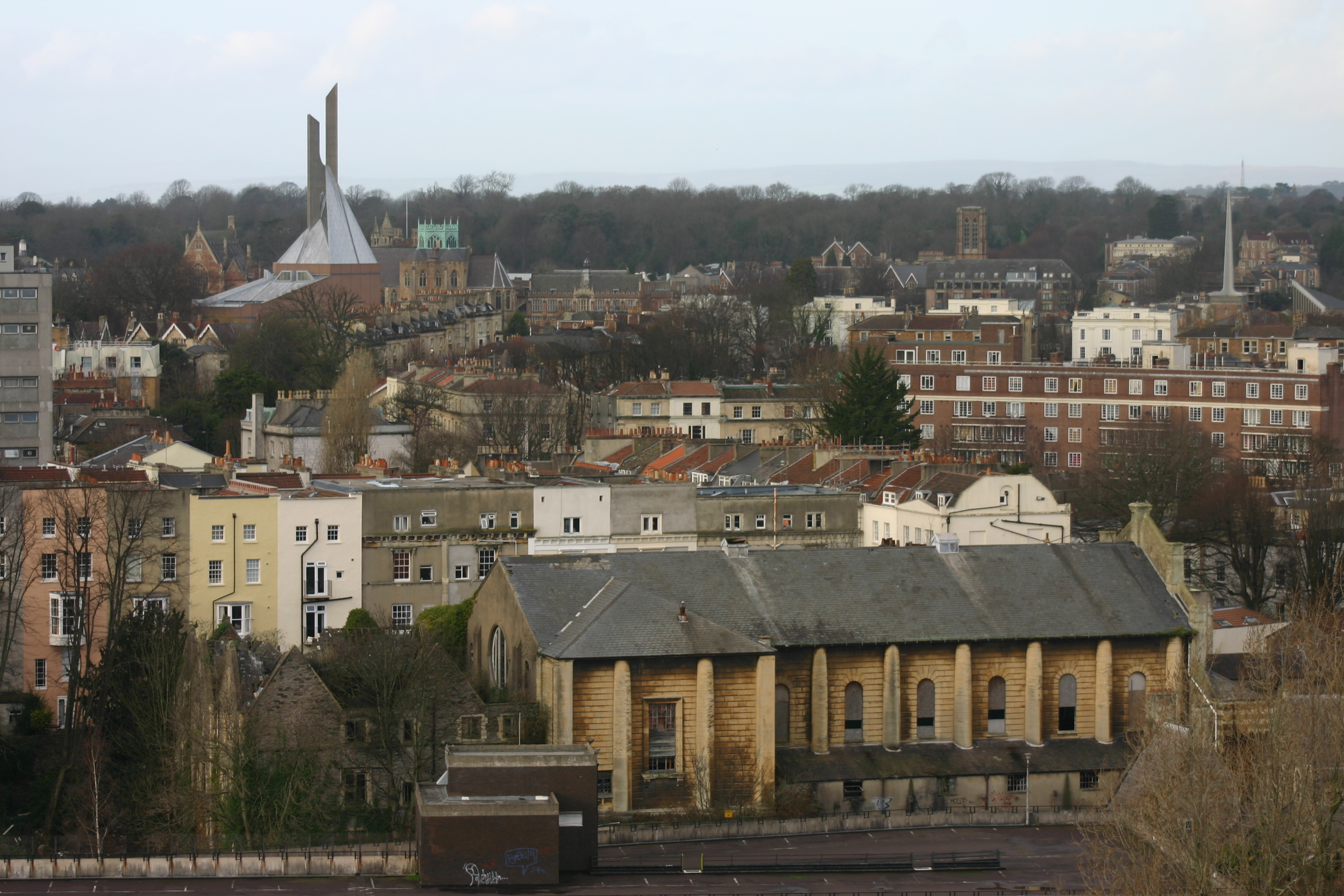
Bristol's Clifton Cathedral (background left) with the Pro-Cathedral of the Holy Apostles, its predecessor (foreground right)

=== A design emerges ===
Ronald Weeks presented many potential shapes and forms for the basic ground plan: one like a conch shell; a fan-shaped plan (rejected as it covered the whole of the available site); a circular plan; a coil-shaped plan, and a helix-shaped plan with great concrete beams in a swirling staircase reaching into the sky. The final design was based on groups of hexagons. For Ronald Weeks the 'architecture then flowed logically form the functions, ...moulded in three dimensions to create the internal environment.'

The arrangement of the different parts of the church placed those of least (liturgical) importance on the periphery leading progressively to the more important elements and to the High Altar. The volume of the church expands from an intimate height to a soaring hexagonal spire over the High Altar, and the amount of daylight increases in proportion to the liturgical significance of the space. The concept was that on entering the cathedral at the Baptistery the people would be reminded of their own baptism (and entry into the Church), and from their places in the Nave participate fully in the celebration of the liturgy at a maximum of 15 metres [45 feet] from the High Altar with no pillars or columns intervening. Every effort was to be made to ensure that the interior should be free from distraction in order to help the worshippers to focus their attention on the Gospel being proclaimed and the service of worship in the liturgy, with no windows in the sight-line of the nave.

Kulić compares Clifton to Liverpool:

' At Liverpool, the interior is cluttered with indecisive liturgical furnishings but these can easily [be] ignored as the scale and form of the space, the central altar and baldachino, and colors (sic) of light predominate. At Clifton, the various elements of the interior are coherently placed and legible, while the exterior is unassuming. For example, lighting by daylight or electric light was to be concealed, as were any windows within the line of sight of those seated in the Nave. The interior of Clifton Cathedral has a quality of openness rather like that of Liverpool [cathedral], but this was intended to allow fluid movement between different areas, and the liturgical elements seem more definitely fixed and appropriate to their allotted places. If finally, there is a sense of certainty in this building, it is one of organiszation (sic) rather than of image.'

Bishop Rudderham pronounced the final design satisfactory: 'Having studied the drawings and the model inside and out I am very much more in tune with the design than I was at the beginning. It has a fine spacious feeling to it. And I think it will be a splendid setting for the liturgy. It brings the people as close as possible to the Altar without crowding them, and there will be plenty of room for our ceremonies.'

'Its planning is more succinct and successful than that at Liverpool Metropolitan Cathedral because it places the altar to one side, with a horseshoe of seating for the congregation. This quickly became a preferred alternative to the notion of seating entirely 'in the round' because of the clearer view it gave everybody of the celebration.'

The contract construction price was agreed at £601,268 (1970), with the additional cost of the site and other fees this brought the total cost of the new building to £800,000 (1970) [estimated equivalent £11,764,705] – the tender included social space, with car parking for 200 cars and living accommodation for the clergy serving the parish.

=== Brutalist architecture ===
Often assumed to take its origin from the English word 'brutal', it is more likely from the French term 'béton brut' meaning 'raw concrete', a term said to have been popularised by the Swiss-French architect Le Corbusier during the construction of the Unité d'habitation in 1952. Brutalism is characterised by simple, block-like structures, that are massive (if not necessarily large) and often repeated in a modular fashion. It typically features bare building materials, with the structure exposed entirely and without interior finishes wherever practicable. Concrete is often used for its raw and unpretentious honesty, revealing the basic nature of its construction, by showing the texture of the wooden planks used for the in-situ casting forms. Another key aspect of Brutalism is that the form of the building should be driven by its intended function, and fundamentally, the cathedral design at Clifton is inspired by the analysis of the practical liturgical requirements arising out of the decisions made about the Sacred Liturgy by the bishops assembled in Rome for the Second Council of the Vatican. In that sense it is functionalist, and the design, to a greater or lesser extent may have also been driven by the need for stringent cost economy.

== Construction ==
Construction began in March 1970 by John Laing & Son Ltd, with the contract price agreed at £601,268 – with the additional cost of the site and other fees this brought the total cost of the new building to £800,000. Phil Smith, of Felix J Samuely & Partners was the site engineer; IE Symons & Partners were the Quantity Surveyors, with Engineering Design Consultants having a responsibility for the environmental control, and Ken Murray acting as Clerk of Works. The foundation stone, carved by Simon Verity, was laid on 26 September 1970, and beneath the stone was placed a copper time capsule.

In May 1972, the construction came to a sudden halt due to a national building industry strike and did not resume until September that same year. By November 1972 the brick supports for the internal star beam were removed. Parish Priest Monsignor Thomas Hughes, Fr Peter Harrison & Ken Murray carried out the traditional 'topping out' ceremony in the Spring of 1973.

The building was completed in May 1973. That same year, on 29 June, the Feast of Saints Peter and Paul, the new cathedral was consecrated and opened. Present were John Cardinal Heenan (Archbishop of Westminster), and twenty-nine bishops from around the United Kingdom, with Bishop Joseph Rudderham (7th bishop of Clifton); civic officials and councillors of Bristol; the Italian and Belgian consuls; the architects; Sir William 'Kirby' Laing (representing John Laing Construction Ltd); the Anglican bishops of Bristol, of Bath and Wells, and of Salisbury. The pro-cathedral was closed and its sale provided fund for the new parish school, SS Peter and Paul on Aberdeen Road, Clifton.

Inscribed into the outside wall of the turret to the right of the Portal of Saint Paul and contained within an equilateral triangle is the symbol '√3' along with the letters PTP. This engraving makes a reference to the architects [Percy Thomas Partnership] and to the controlling mathematical formula used by Ronald Weeks in the design.

== Exterior ==
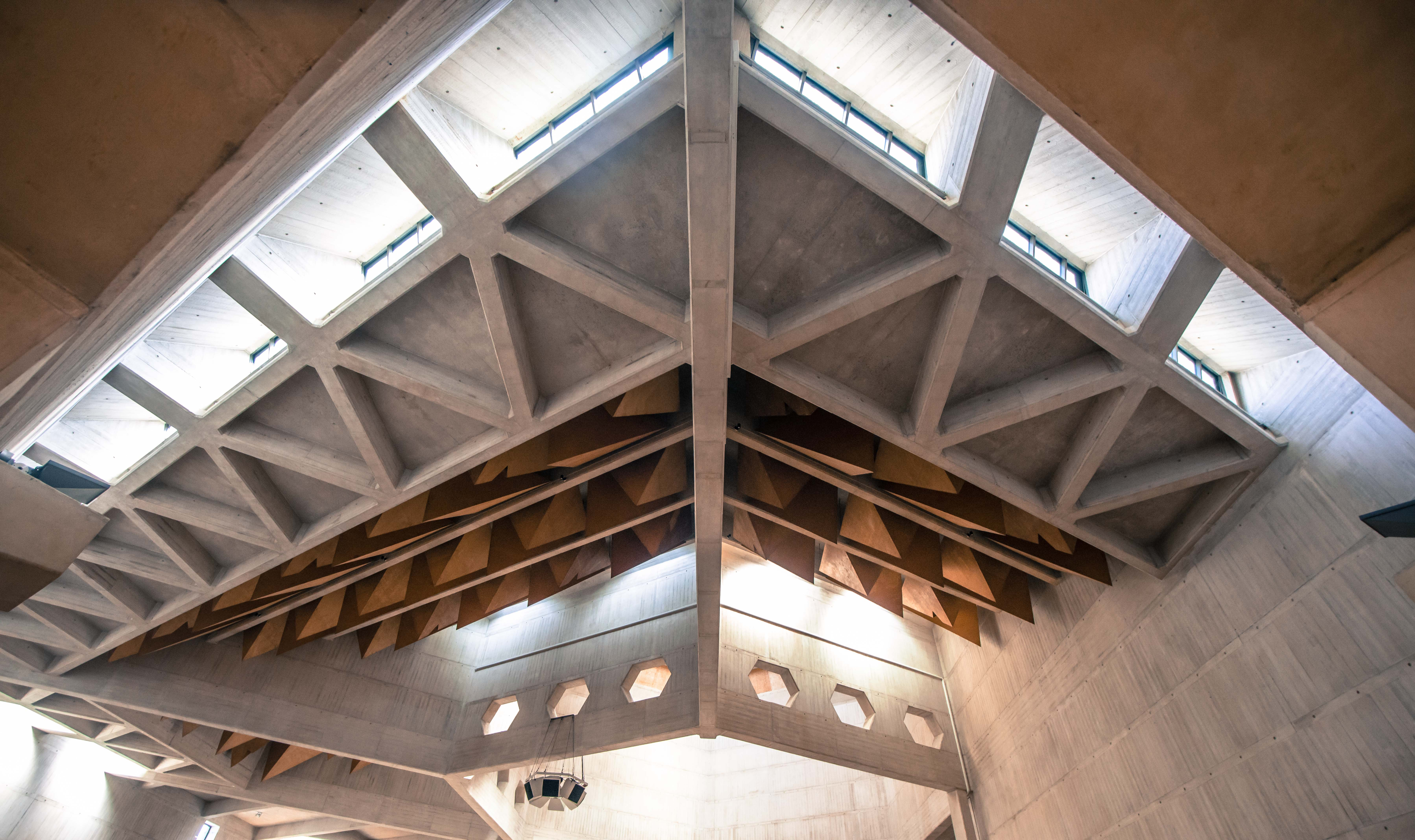
Nave of Clifton Cathedral, showing concrete structures and engineering, acoustic baffles and 'hidden' windows (including star beam in lower part, with hexagonal cutouts)

The cathedral is made from in-situ cast reinforced Portland concrete, with some pre-cast panels. The particularly fine, pale concrete has aged well. The imprint of the timber formwork used to mould the concrete can still be seen in the building. All the concrete was mixed by a single man. The vertical walls of the lower part of the building are clad with red Aberdeen Granite composite panels (made by

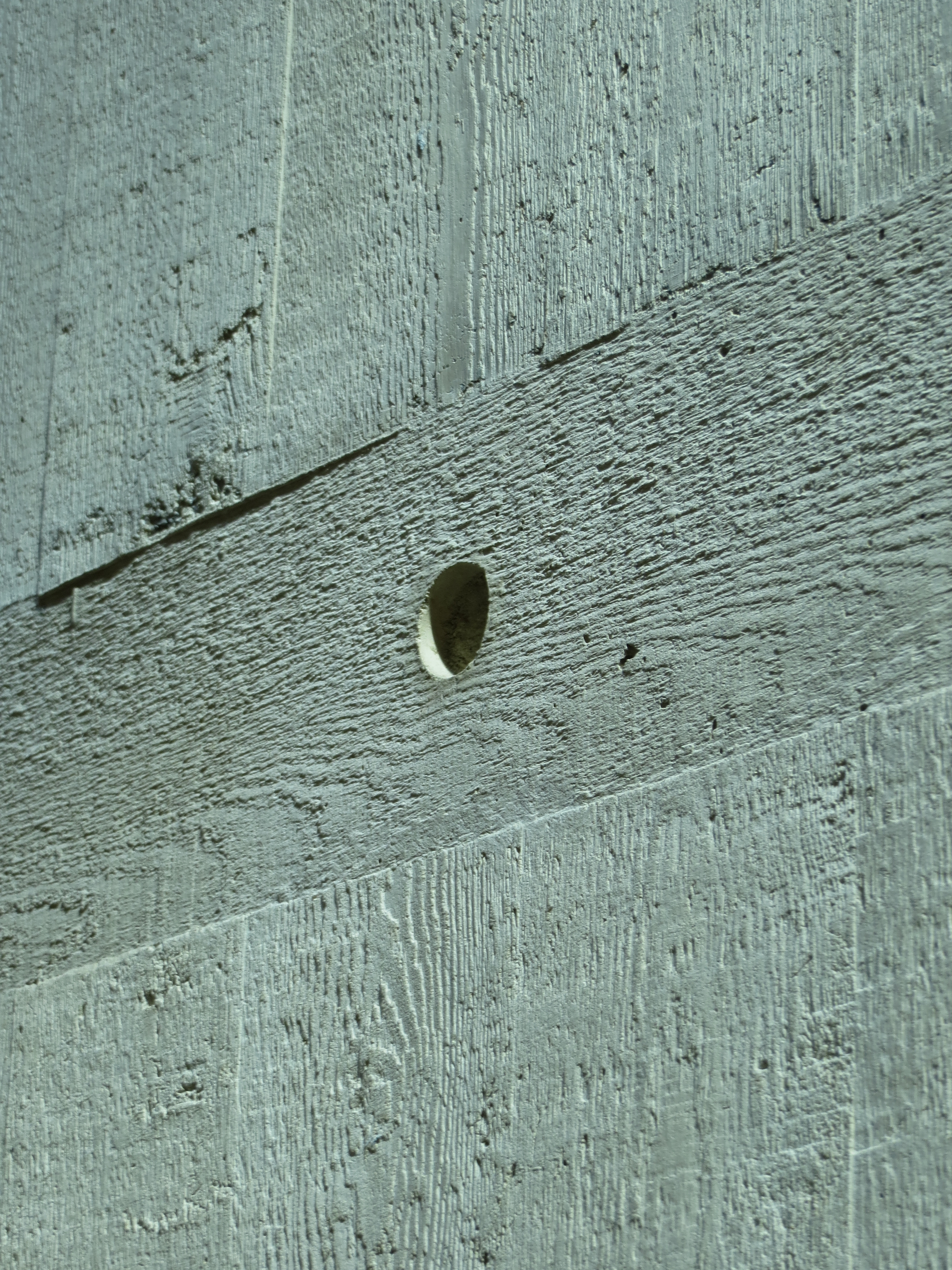
Detail of Concrete, showing marks of timber formwork, Clifton Cathedral

Marble Mosaic Ltd), with roofing in lead. Rainwater is channelled through simple gargoyles into a number of semi-hexagonal pools around the building.

Inscribed into the outside wall of the turret to the right of the Portal of Saint Paul [see Exterior Plan]. Contained within an equilateral triangle is the symbol '√3' along with the letters PTP. This engraving makes a reference to the architects [Percy Thomas Partnership] and to the proportions of the equilateral triangle (and therefore regular hexagon) used by Ronald Weeks, which provide a deep symmetry in the design.

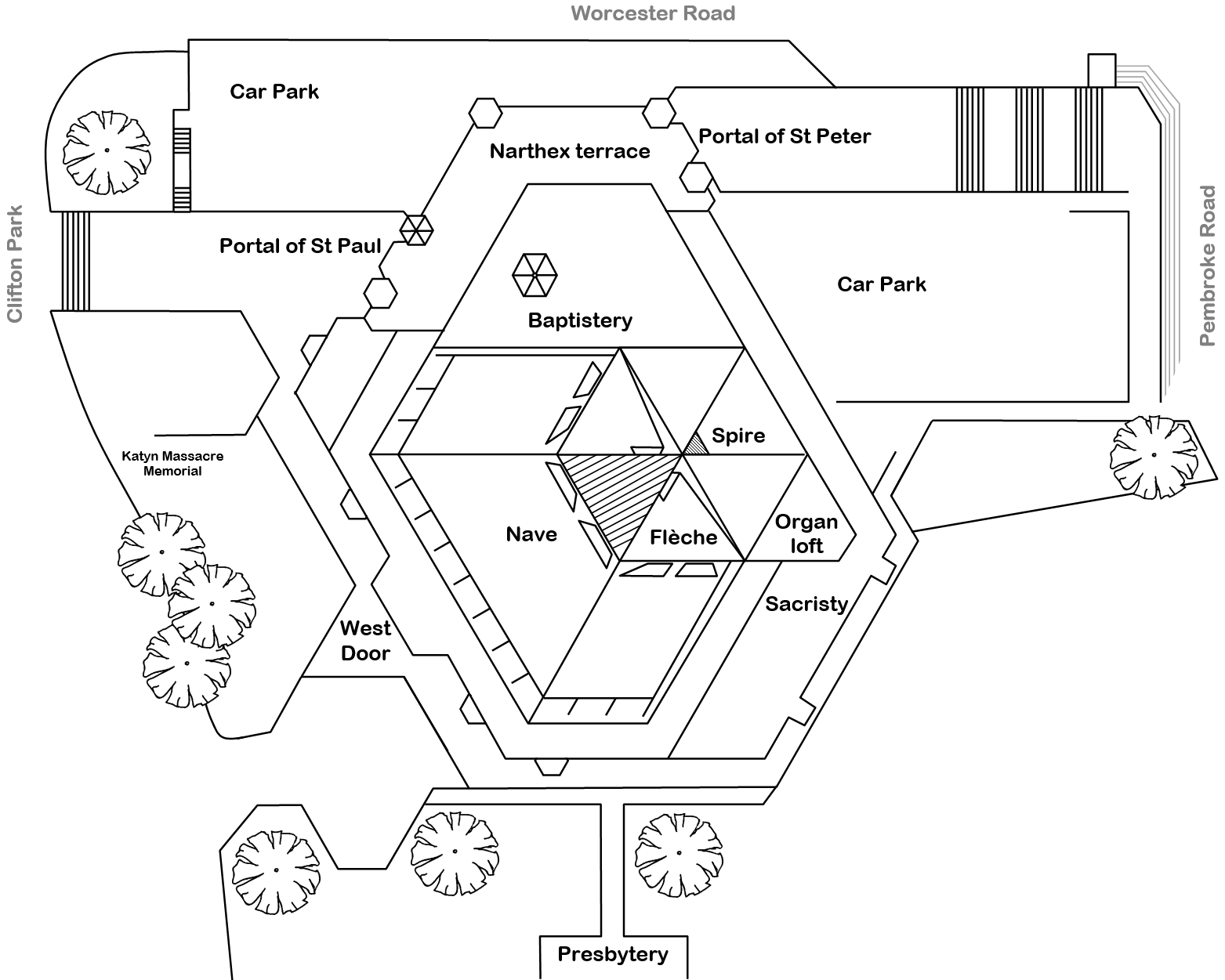
Architectural plan of the exterior of Clifton Cathedral

=== Flèche and spire ===
The hexagonal flèche rises to support a three-pronged spire, enclosing a cross. The spire contains two bronze bells, one of the few things transferred from the ProCathedral, by John Taylor & Co (1901, tuned to F and C with diameters of 1'10" and 2'5 1/2", and weights 1-3-26 and 4-2-26).

=== Ceremonial doors ===
The three original ceremonial doors (sponsored by Bristol City Council) were made of plywood pivoting on a central point, rendered with an artistic fibreglass by the artist William Mitchell, and bearing the Coat of Arms of the City and County of Bristol on one side and the arms of the Bishop of Clifton Dr Joseph Rudderham on the other side. The fibreglass render was similar to that found on the Ambo (Lectern). The current glass doors, installed in 1995, still bear the same crests.

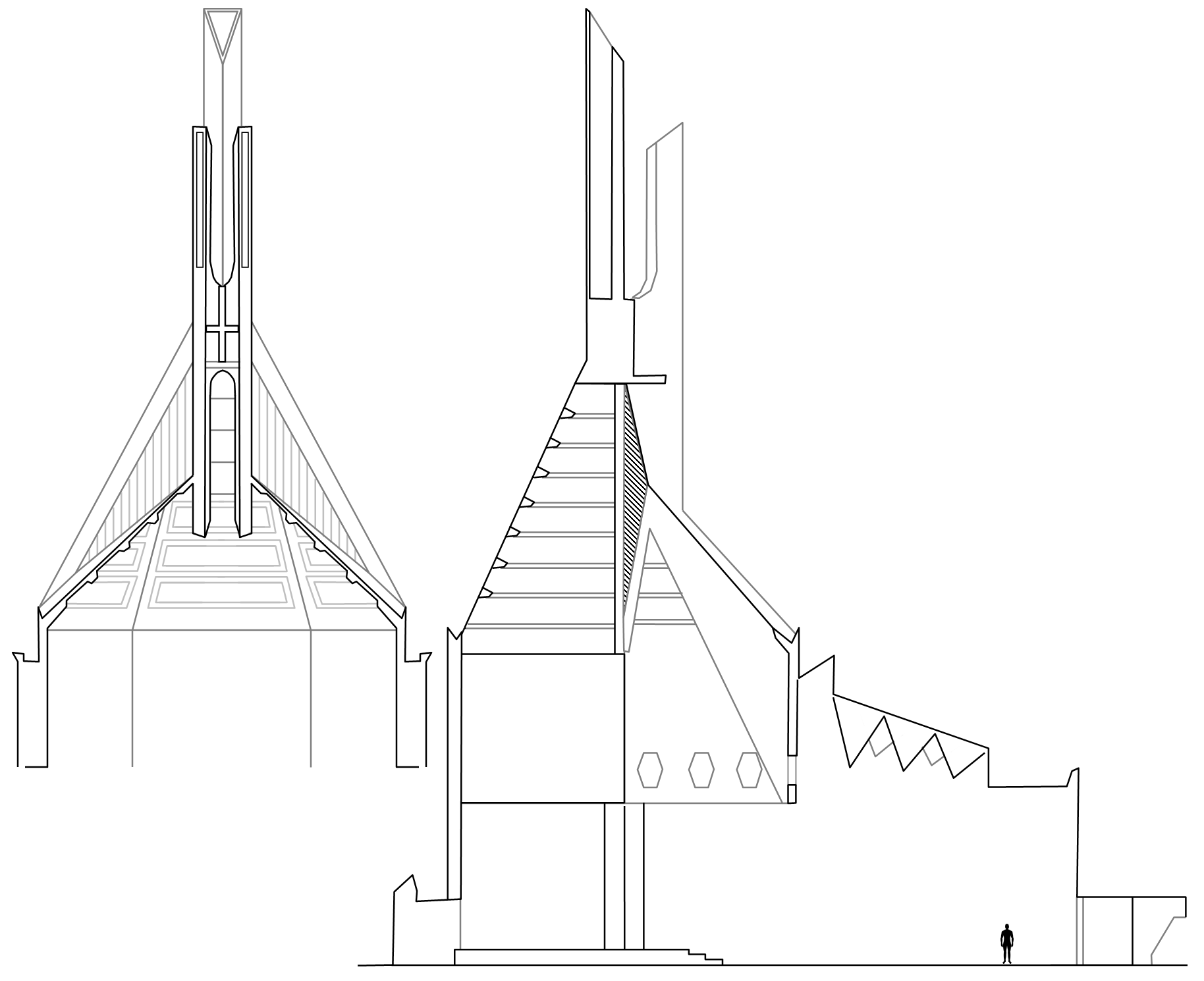
Architectural section through Clifton Cathedral, showing the flèche and spires. The interior star beam (which supports the flèche above, and has cutout hexagons) is 17m (55ft) above the sanctuary.

=== Katyn Memorial ===
Close to the West Door [see Exterior Plan] is a large stone memorial to the Katyn Massacre, by Alexander Klecki, installed in 1985. Nearby are the graves of Rt Rev Mervyn Alexander, eighth Bishop of Clifton (1974–2001) and of Rt Rev Mgr Thomas Hughes, Vicar-General and first Parish Priest of the new Cathedral (1973–1981). The inscription on his gravestone reads: 'Si monumentum quaeris circumspice' or 'If you are looking for a monument, look around you'.

=== Presbytery ===
The clergy accommodation – Cathedral House – is located to the south of the cathedral and was designed by Irena Weeks, Ronald Weeks' wife, who was a designer and also trained at the Bartlett School of Architecture

== Interior ==
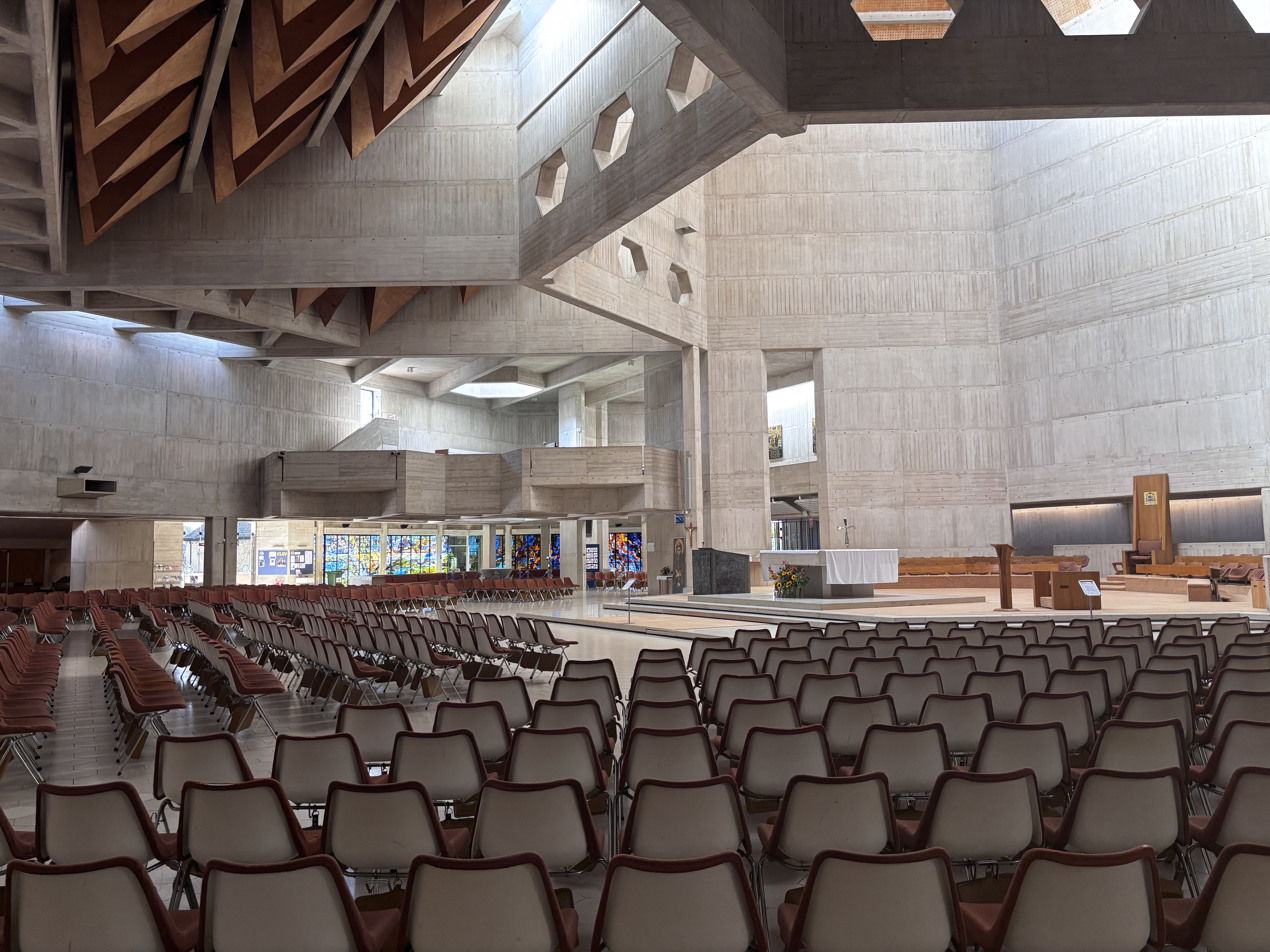
Interior of the Cathedral

=== Narthex ===
The narthex is a zone of transition from the busy world of everyday life outside, to a quieter and more intimate spiritual space within the cathedral.

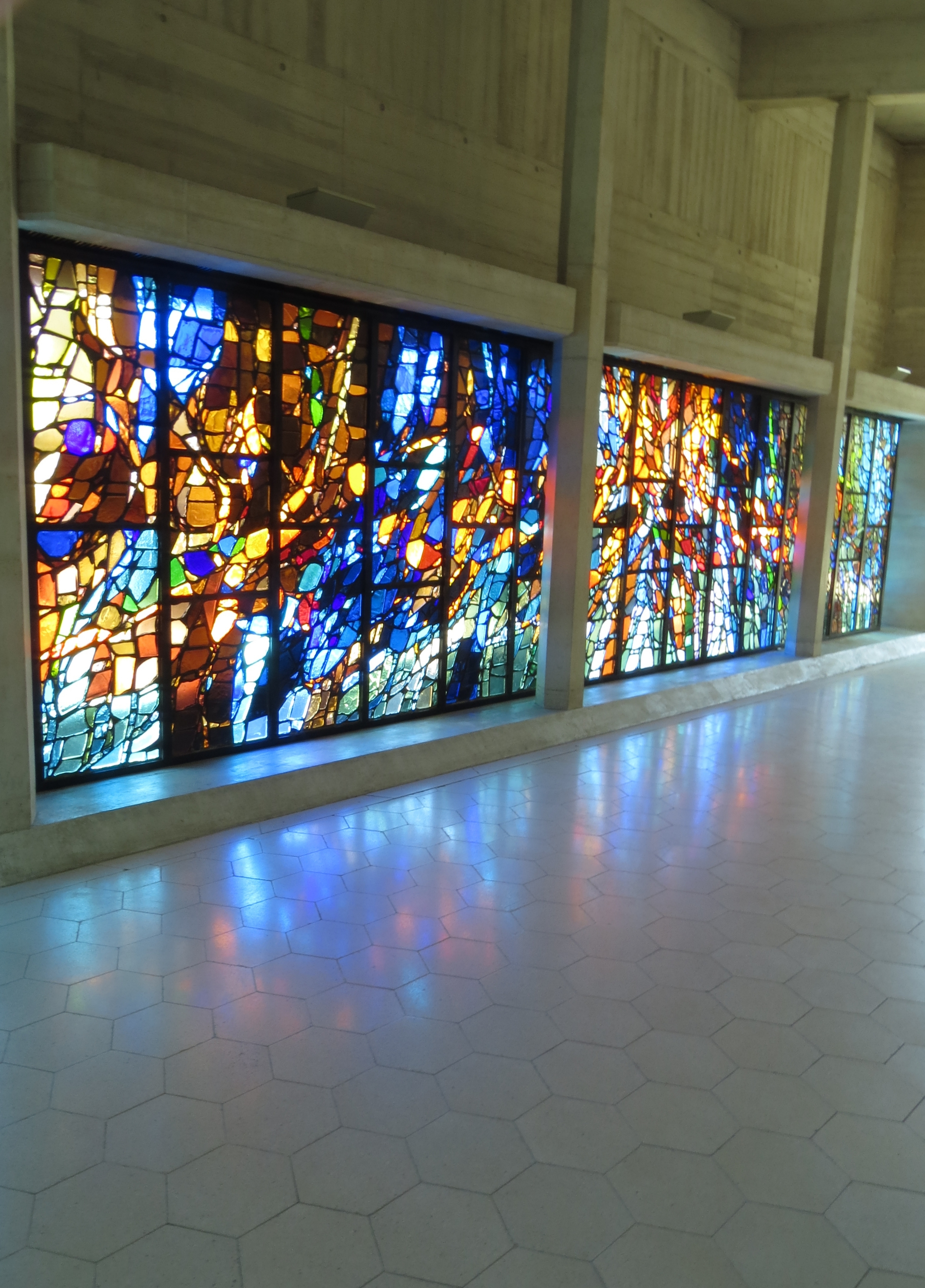
Narthex window 'Jubilation', by Henry Haig, Clifton Cathedral

The West Country artist Henry Haig designed the windows. The glass windows use a technique known as dalle de verre – shaped coloured glass pieces mounted in metal frames with epoxy resin – constructed from over 8,000 pieces of glass collected from England, France and Germany. The window closest to the Portal of St Paul is titled 'Jubilation', intended to express the Catholic concept of joy in God's Creation, and prompted by the Second Vatican Council's instructions on a duty of care for the environment. The window nearer the Portal of St Peter is titled 'Pentecost'. Here the artist has created a swirling image to depict the experience of the Apostles after the death of Jesus, a moment of re-creation for the Church.

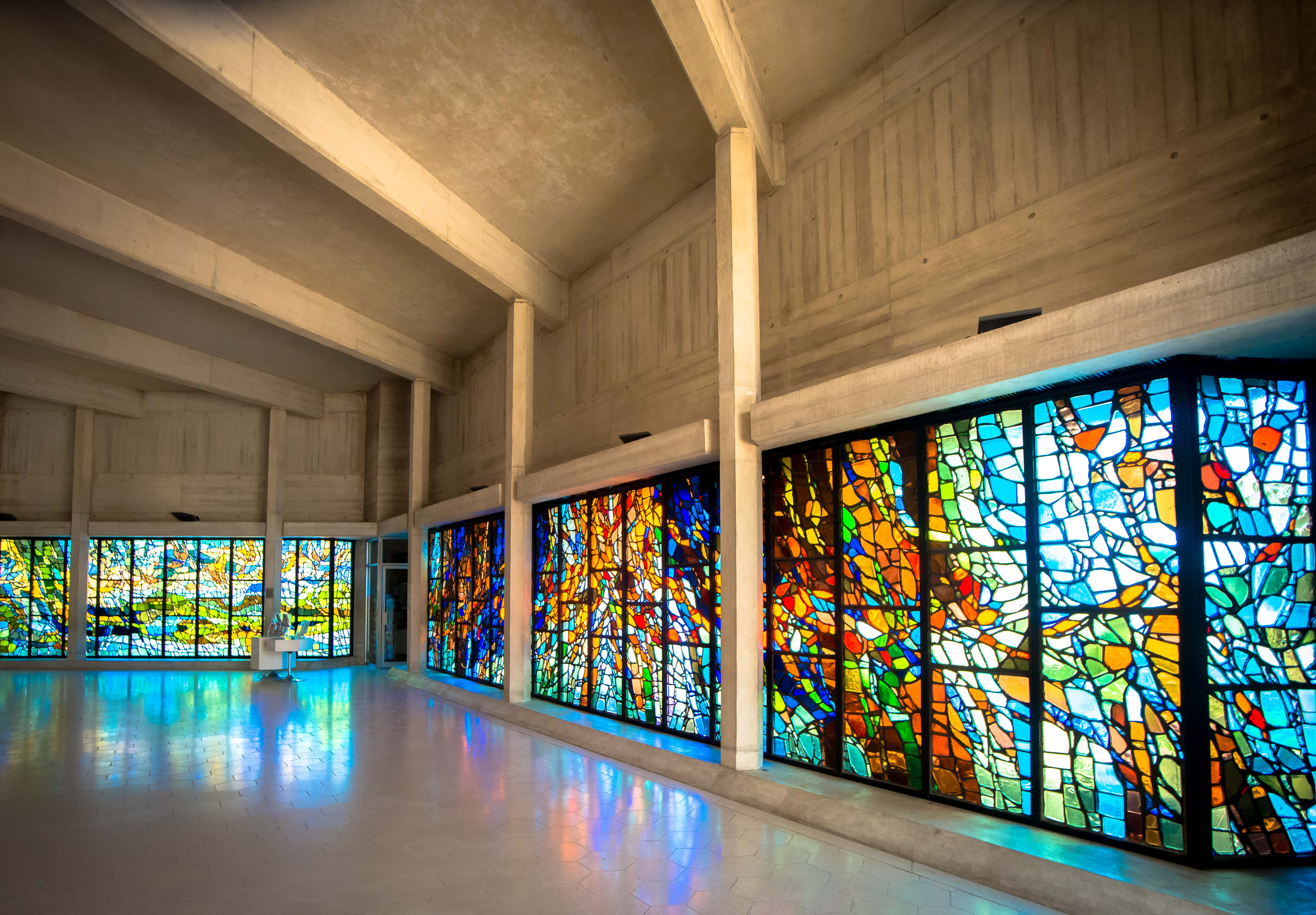
Narthex stained glass by Henry Haig ('Pentecost' to right, 'Jubilation' ahead)

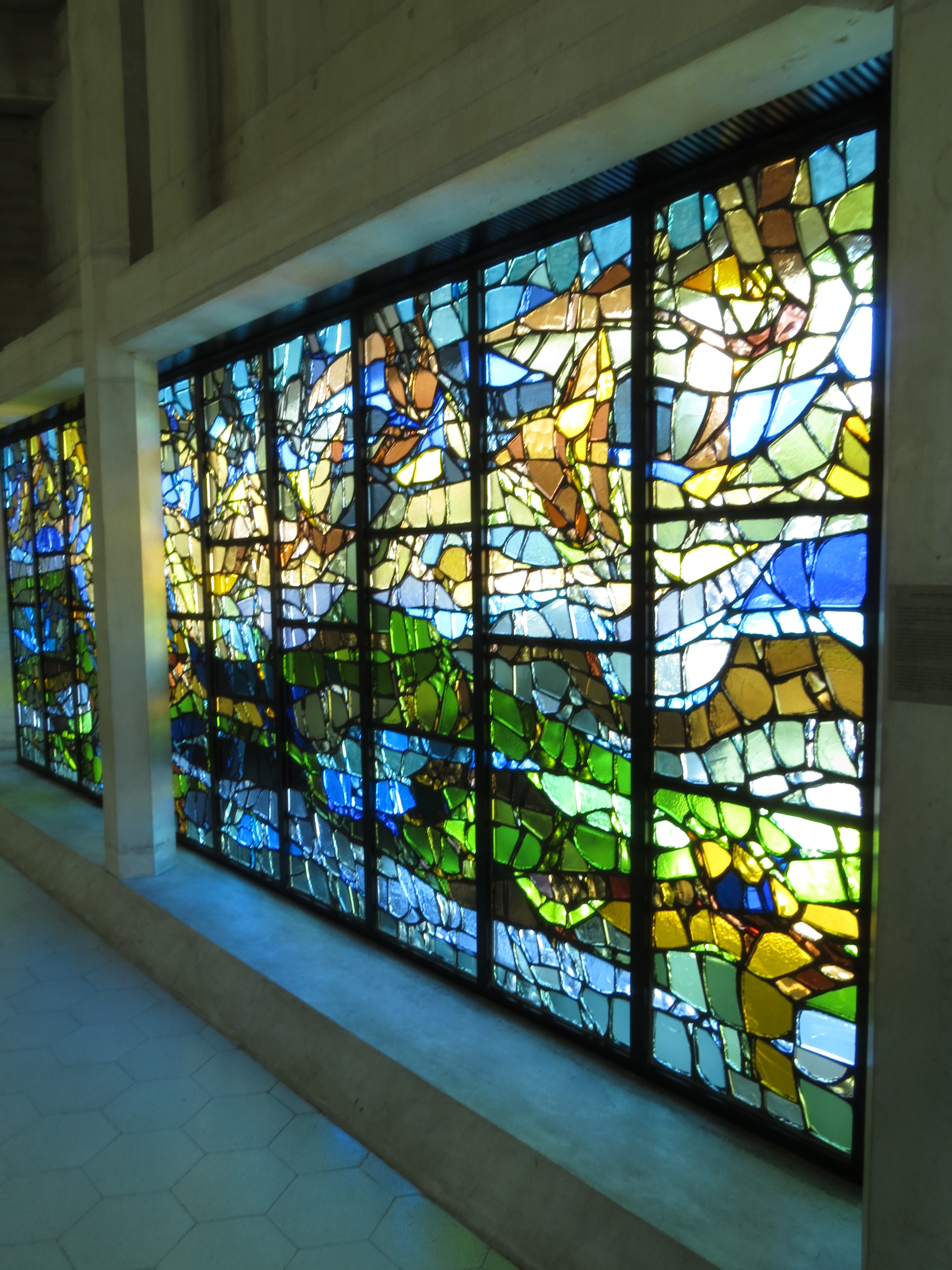
Narthex window 'Pentecost' by Henry Haig, Clifton Cathedral

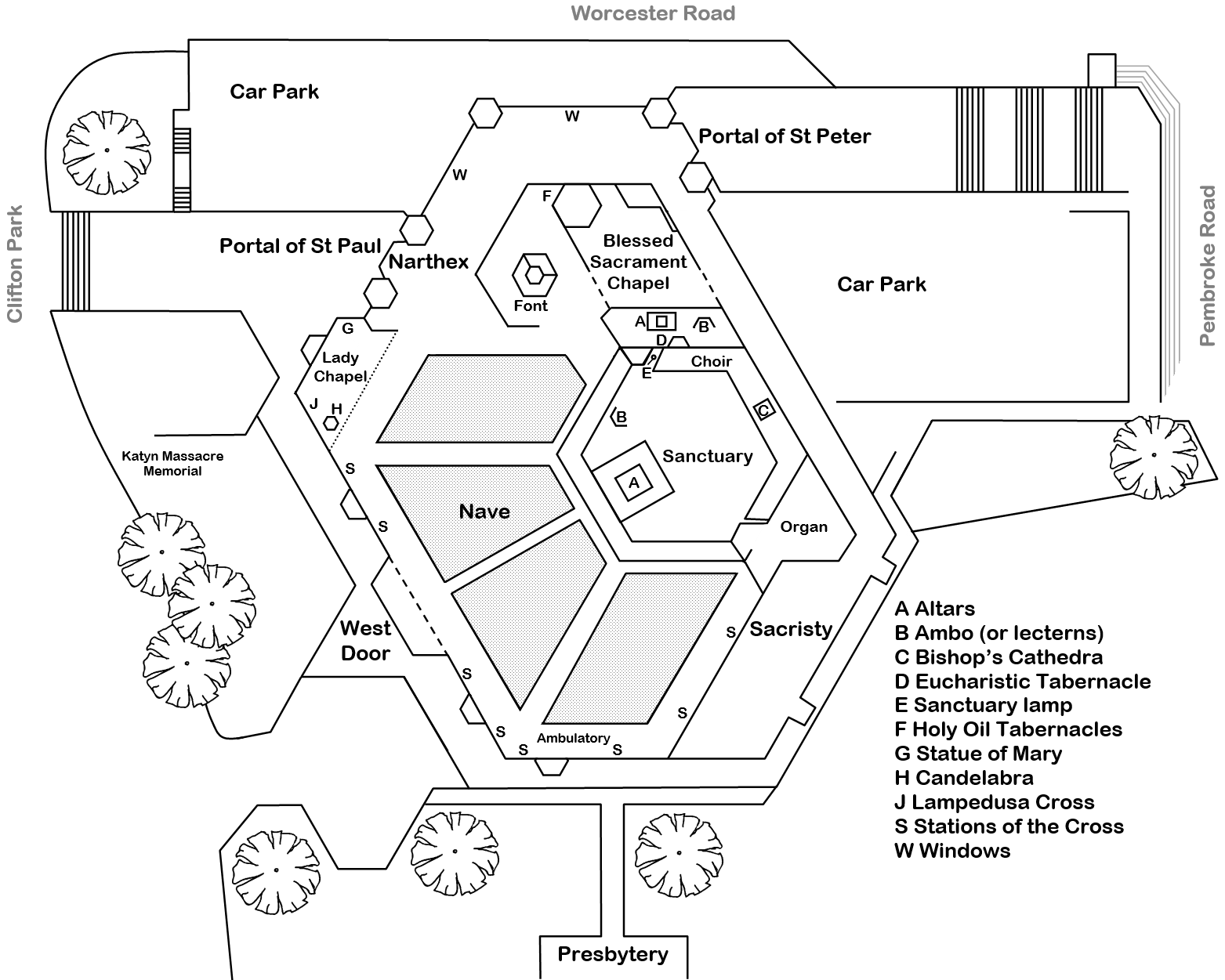
Architectural plan of the Interior of Clifton Cathedral

=== Baptistery ===
The baptistery is located near to the entrance, to remind all those on entering the cathedral of the occasion when at their own baptism they first joined the assembly of God's People. It is in full view of the people sitting in the nave. The font is partly surrounded by a pool and is lit from above by daylight through a hexagonal lantern (skylight), representing the illumination of baptism. The baptistery is lauded by Kulić: 'The architects' treatment of the baptistery was exemplary and further demonstrates their [collaborative] approach...' The Font itself was carved from Portland stone by Simon Verity. Only after carving began did Verity realise that a complete fossil fish was present in the base of the font: 'If I had only known it was there, I would have made it a feature of the interior of the font bowl that you can see today. So instead, I have carved the fishes chasing around the plughole!'. The bowl of the font does show fossilised sea creatures. Around the lip of the font are carved the words: 'Once you were no people, now you are God's People'.

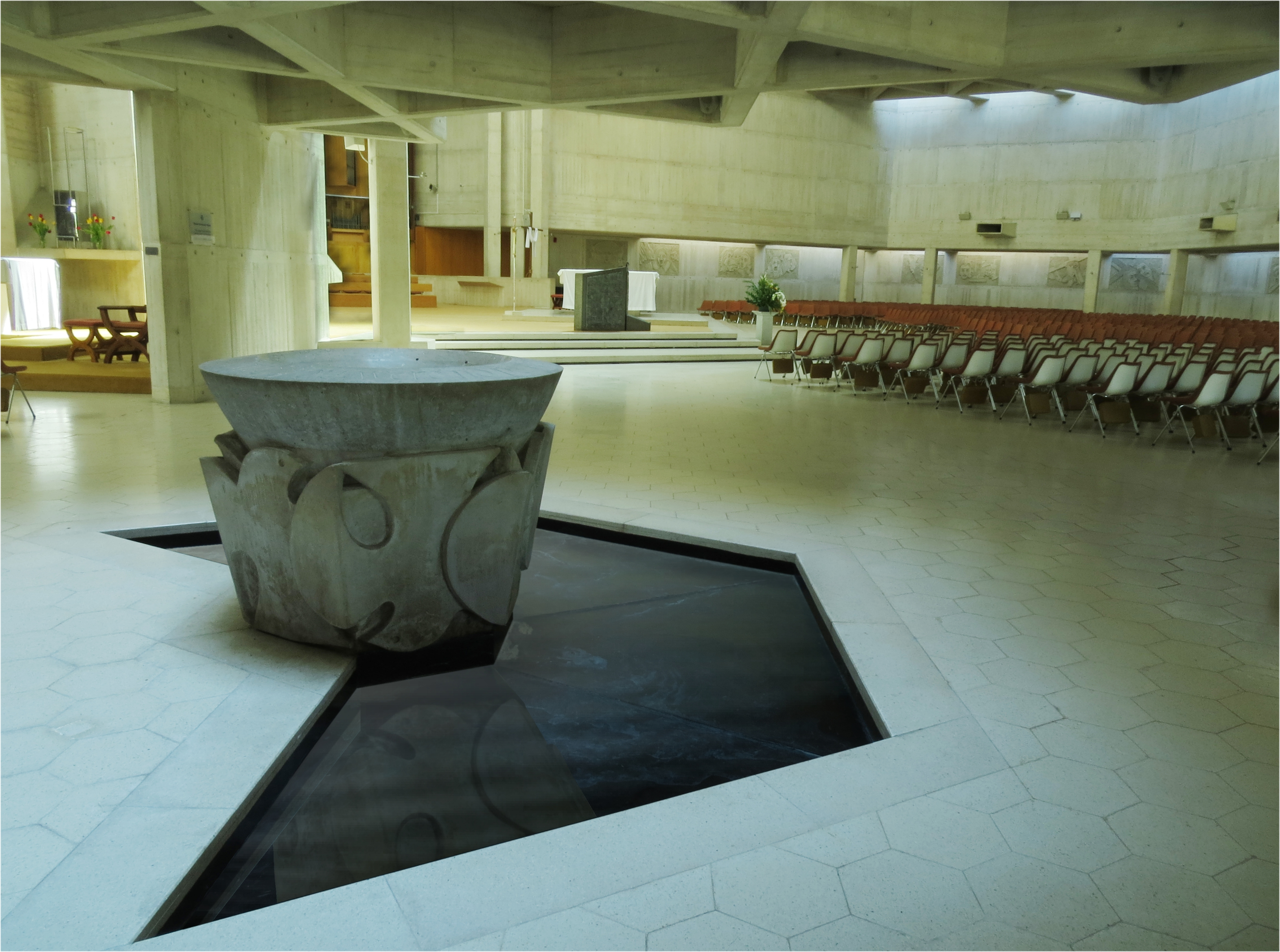
Clifton Cathedral, font in baptistery, view towards sanctuary and nave

During baptisms the Paschal candle stands near the font (at other time it is on the sanctuary). The paschal candle stand is formed from segments of triangular stainless steel and was designed by Ronald Weeks. In the wall adjacent to the baptistery there are three Holy Oil tabernacles [F on Plan], for the retention of the Holy Oils used in the sacraments of the Church (the Oil of Catechumens, Oil of Chrism and Oil of the Sick).

=== Sanctuary ===
The sanctuary space [see Plan & Section], containing the altar, is hexagonal. The weight-bearing star beam supporting the flèche and spire follows the edge of the sanctuary steps. It is 17 m (55 ft) high and pierced with hexagonal holes. On the sanctuary, symbolically closest to the baptistery, is the ambo (or lectern), used for reading the Scriptures. It is covered in fibreglass panels by William Mitchell (similar panels previously covered the three ceremonial doors). The altar [A on Plan], designed by Ronald Weeks, is made of Portland stone, raised on legs (visible from the side) and contains relics of Pope Pius X (1835–1914) and Oliver Plunkett (1625–1681). The lighting ensures that the sanctuary area remains the focus of the cathedral.

The bishop's chair or cathedra [C on Plan] is what gives the church the name "cathedral". Rather than a throne, here, it is a simple chair in a tall ash-wood surround bearing the coat of arms of Joseph Rudderham, seventh bishop of Clifton. Flanking the cathedra are rows of seating, in ash with Robin Day chairs, for the choir (right) and clergy (left). Symbolically, the congregation and clergy sit on the same chairs, indicating that all are equal before God.

=== Blessed Sacrament Chapel ===
Located through a tall archway from the sanctuary is the Blessed Sacrament Chapel [see Plan] a place of quiet prayer, as well as smaller or more intimate services. It contains an altar [A on Plan] and an ambo [B on Plan] as

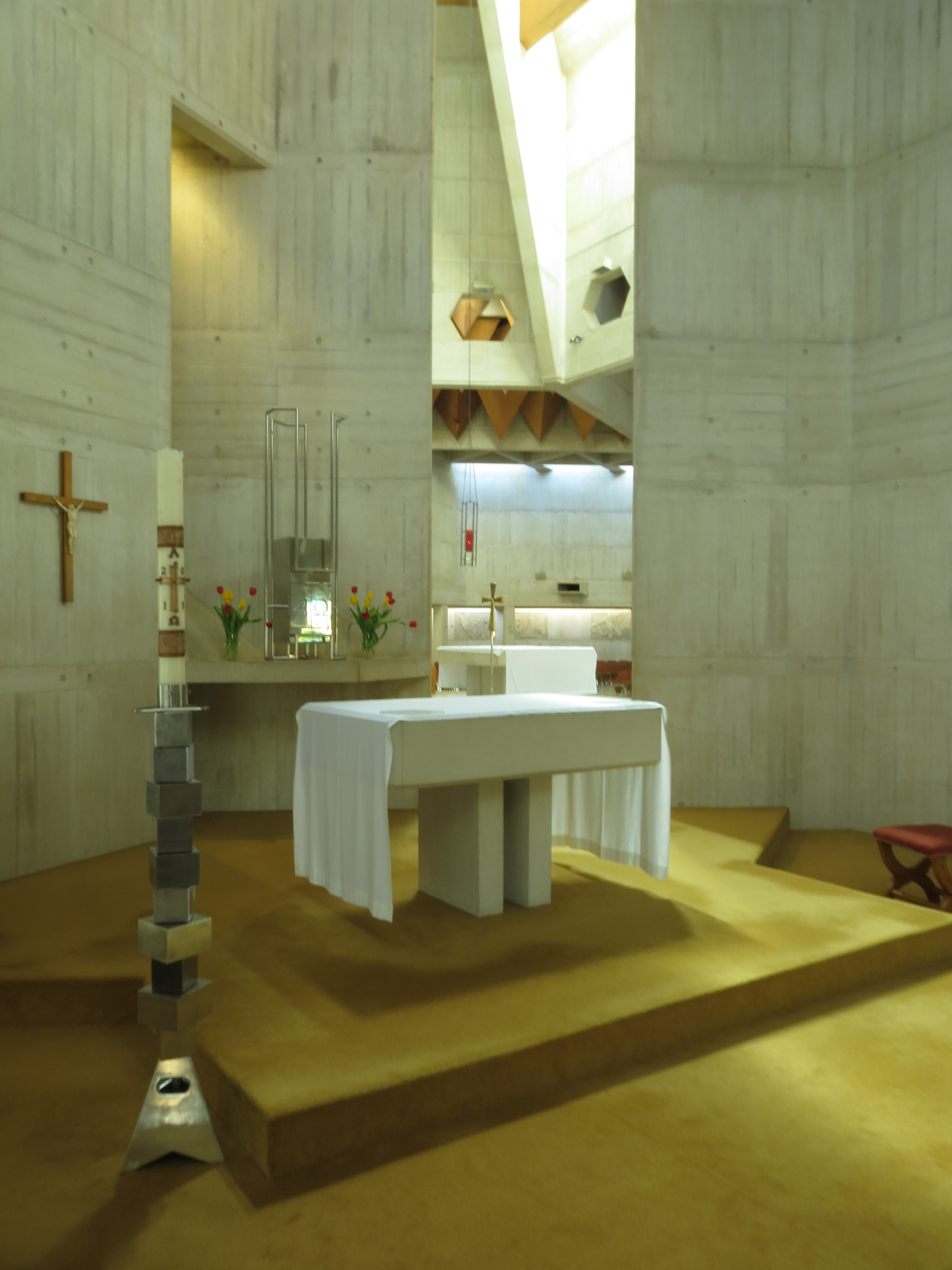
Blessed Sacrament Chapel, with Paschal candle stand, Clifton Cathedral

well as the tabernacle, used to store ('reserve') the Eucharist [D on Plan]. Its location in the Blessed Sacrament Chapel reflects the view of the Second Vatican Council that the tabernacle should be separate from the high altar, in a place of prominence and accessible to the congregation.

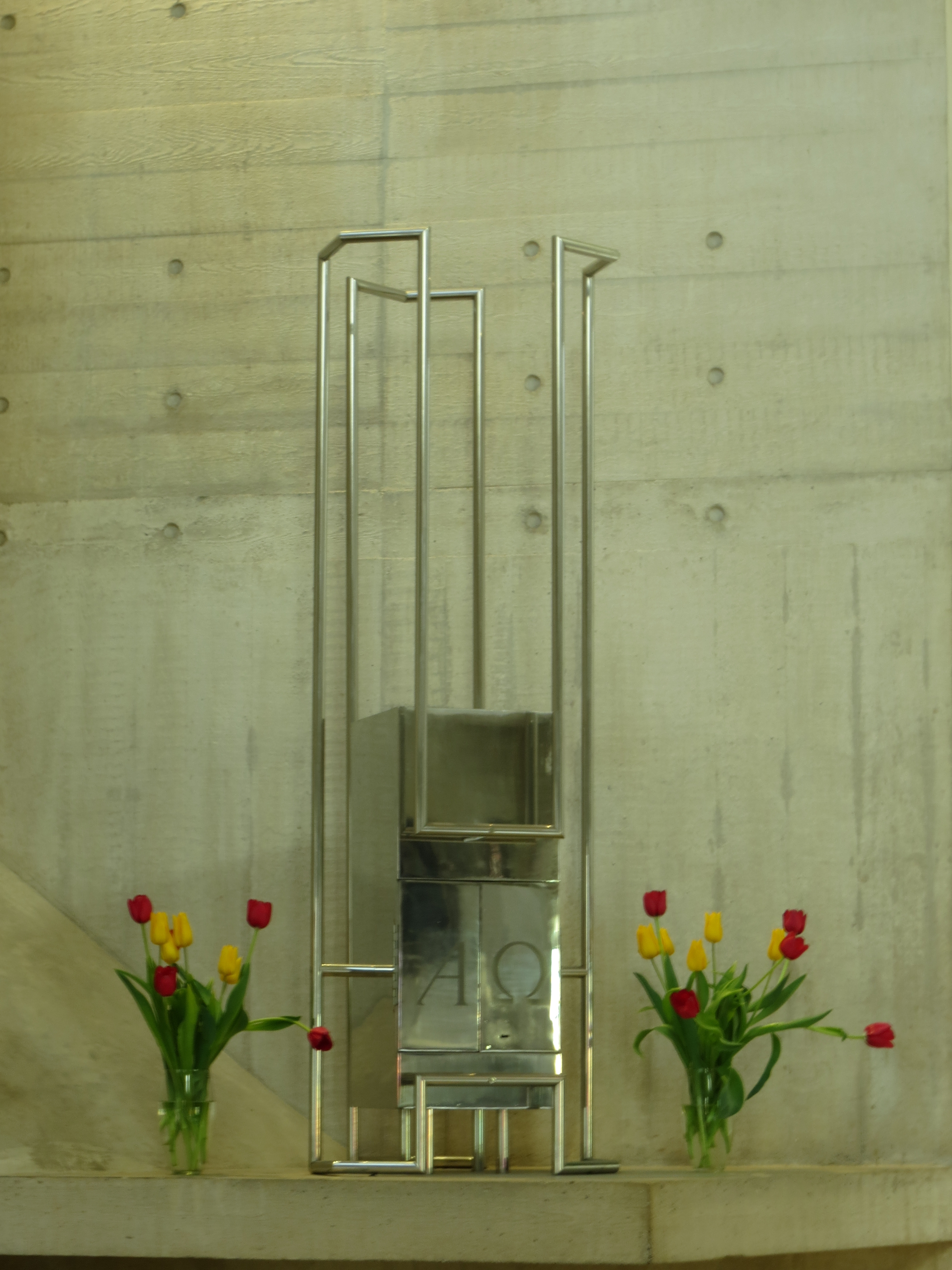
Tabernacle, Blessed Sacrament Chapel, Clifton Cathedral

The artist John Alder, with the guidance of Ronald Weeks, designed the stainless steel tabernacle to reflect the idea of a tent pitched among the people to reflect the original Jewish Tabernacle. The presence of the Eucharist is marked by a lit sanctuary lamp [E on Plan], designed by Ronald Weeks and executed in stainless steel. Brother Patrick, one of the monks of Prinknash Abbey in Gloucestershire, designed and made the steel railings bordering the space of the chapel.

On 22 March 2020 the Blessed Sacrament Chapel was used for the first live-streamed mass from the cathedral, by Bishop Declan Lang, due to the pausing of public worship as a public health measure during the 2019–2020 coronavirus pandemic.

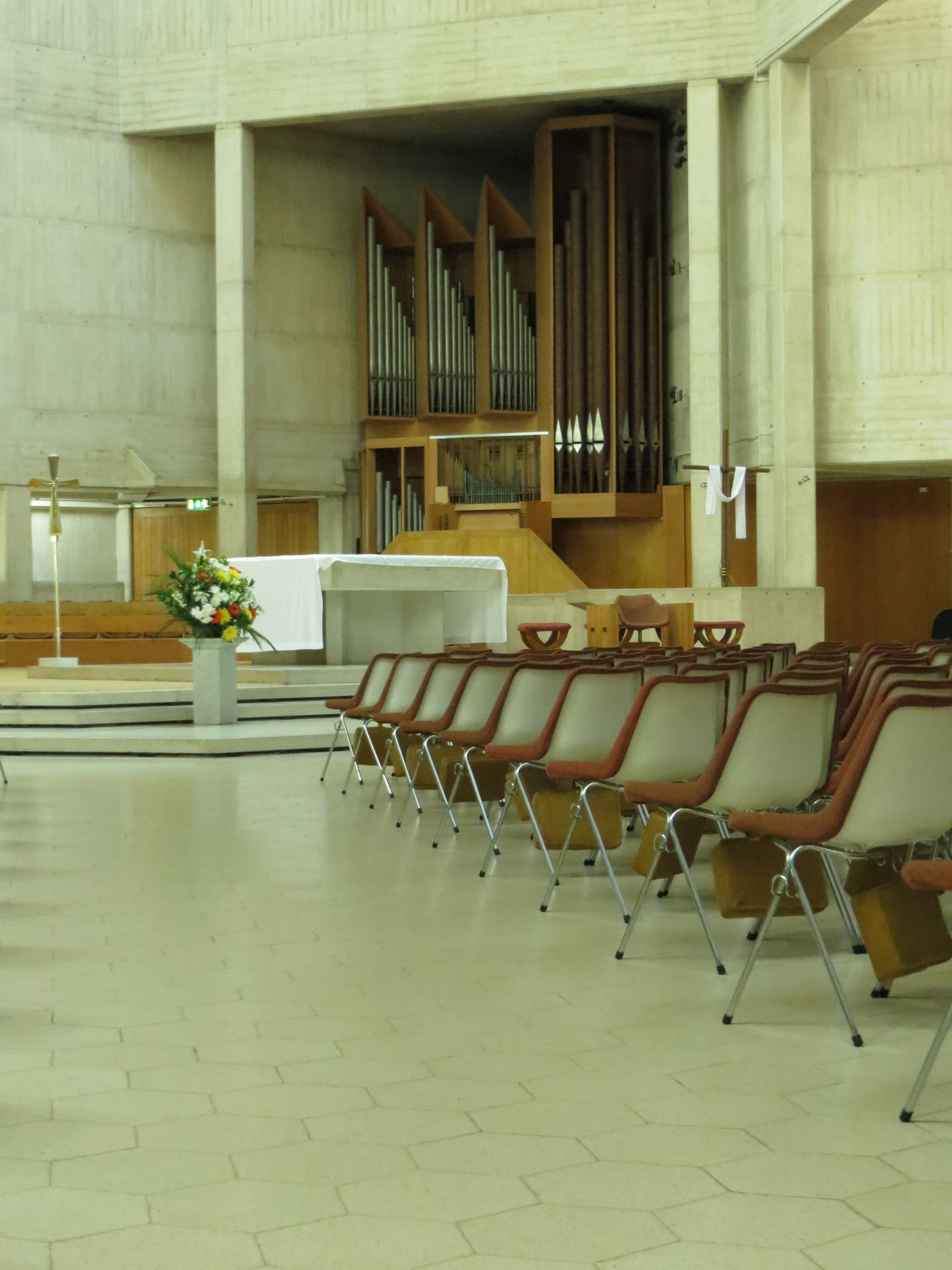
Rieger organ, sanctuary and nave, Clifton Cathedral

=== Organ ===
The cost of moving the ProCathedral organ was prohibitive, so a new organ designed by Josef von Glatter-Götz Jr of Rieger Orgelbau of Austria (with John Rowntree) was commissioned at a cost of £18,000 (1973). The triangular and hexagonal structure of the ash-wood casing was designed by Glatter-Götz & Ronald Weeks. It was installed by Martin Pflüger. The organ has 1,830 pipes, with 26 speaking stops and no extensions or no duplexing. The keyboard, pedal and stop action is entirely mechanical. Apart from 5 reversible foot pedals to the couplers (situated to the left of the swell pedal) there are no playing aids whatsoever. There is no III/I manual coupler. The keyboards are reversed with white sharps and ebony natural keys. The pedal board is a hybrid of the RCO standard pedal board specification (concave and radiating) and a straight pedal board as would have been found in earlier organs. The pedals extend to F and the manuals to G. The blower is a Swiss Meidinger model and the wind supply to the chests of the Schwimmer form.

=== Nave ===
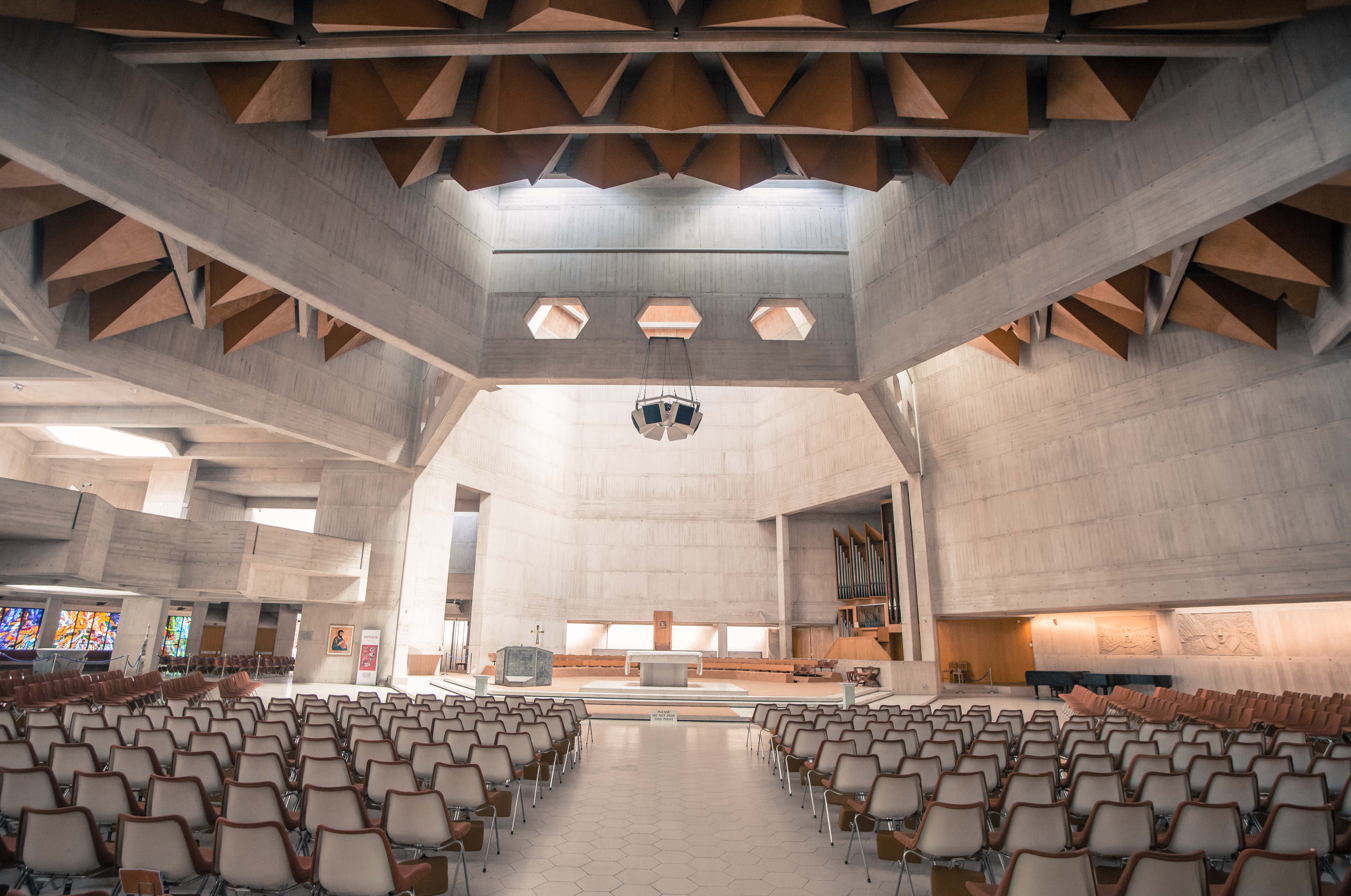
The interior of Clifton Cathedral, view from the West Door showing the nave seating (with acoustic tetrahedra above) and sanctuary with organ (right). Above the central hanging speakers is the interior star beam, pierced with hexagonal holes.

There are no columns within the nave, due to the use of the interior star beam (which supports the flèche above). This ensures an uninterrupted view of the liturgy, for every member of the congregation.

The nave seating is uniform, and the same as the sanctuary, to reflect that all people are equal before God. The seating is around the lectern and altar space, reflecting a person's sacramental journey within the Catholic Church. The Robin Day polypropylene chairs, are now recognised as a 'British Design Classic' (In 2009 the polypropylene stacking chair was selected by Royal Mail to appear on a postage stamp as one of eight designs in a 2009 series celebrating "British Design Classics". The cathedral is consulting on replacing the now 46-year-old chairs.

The nave and sanctuary lighting is carefully designed. There are no windows in the sight-line of the congregation and no distractions. Instead, the sanctuary is lit by daylight from hidden skylights in the flèche, supplemented by environmentally-friendly LED lighting designed by Lighting Design and Technology. The lighting is designed so that it is proportion to the liturgical significance of the area, so the sanctuary is the best-lit part of the cathedral. As Kulić noted: 'At Clifton, the architects did not eschew aesthetic expression, but, as [an] example, manipulated light for its symbolic meanings.'

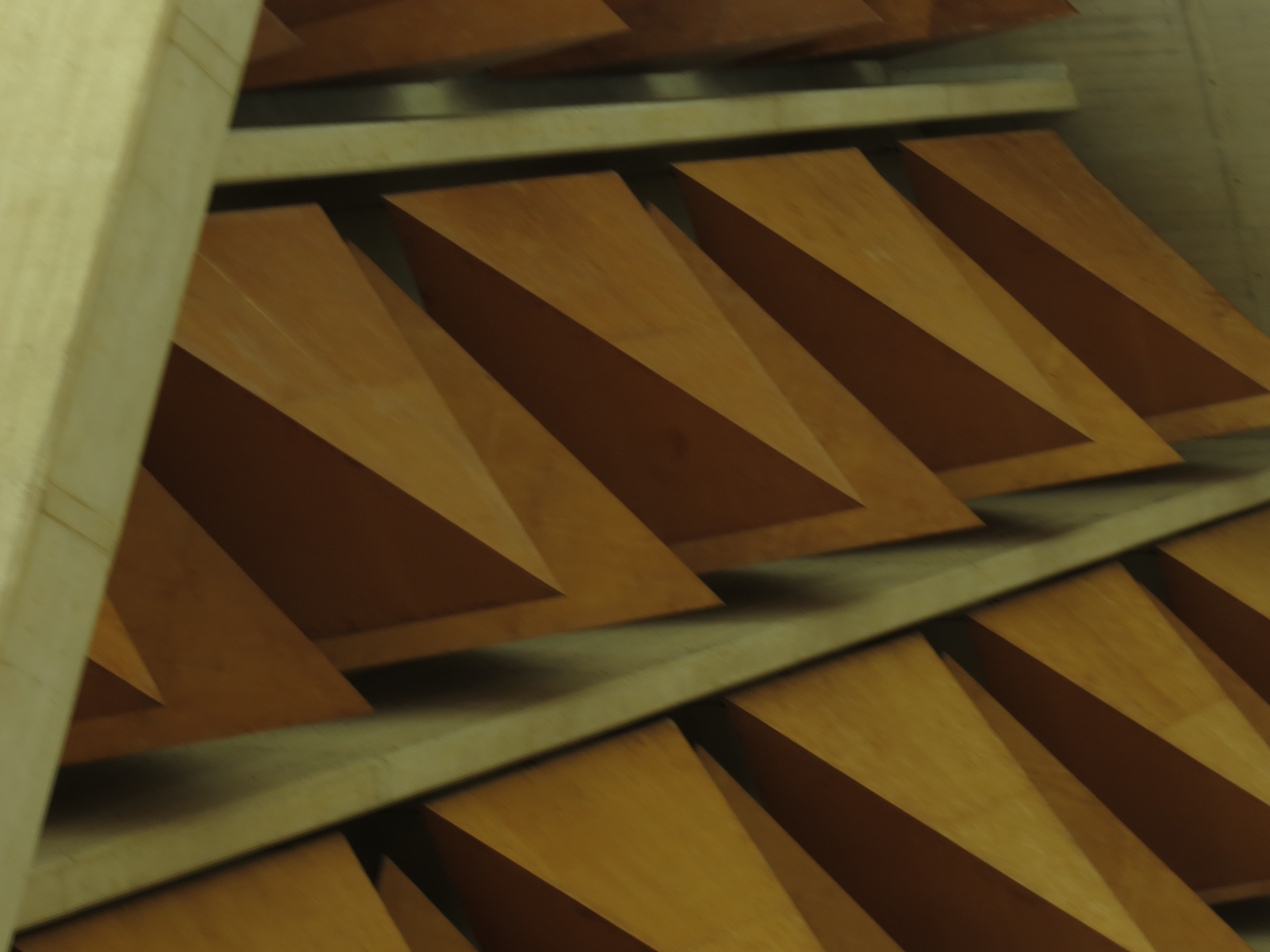
Tetrahedral acoustic baffles, Nave, Clifton Cathedral

The acoustics of the nave were very important to the designers – in the days before loudspeakers a speaker's voice needed to carry throughout the nave. The larger space over the nave is 'tuned' to a reverberation time of about 1.5 seconds, while the sanctuary space offers the musicians a more satisfactory 7.5 seconds. The plywood tetrahedra in the nave ceiling are part of the acoustic scheme. The cathedral now has a modern loudspeaker system and T Loop, and the acoustics have been described as 'first-rate'.

The nave flooring is made of hexagonal tiles. Richard Gordon, one of the architectural assistants, worked on a ground plan of the building and drew out each tile to determine the number of tiles required.

=== Ambulatory and Stations of the Cross ===
Whilst being primarily designed to allow free movement around the periphery of the cathedral, the columned ambulatory is also home to the fourteen Stations of the Cross [S on Plan]. These are episodes from the death (or Passion) of Christ and reflect parts of the via dolorosa in Jerusalem. Special permission had to be sought from the Holy See for the atypical Stations used in the cathedral. Originally intended to be executed in stone (it was thought that these would be damaged by later building work), the Stations were made by William Mitchell using Faircrete (a mixture of concrete, resin and nylon fibres). The artist was asked about what reaction people had to his work: 'Well the work is a bit hairy I suppose, but then so was the experience of crucifixion.'

Stations of the Cross, Clifton Cathedral by William Mitchell

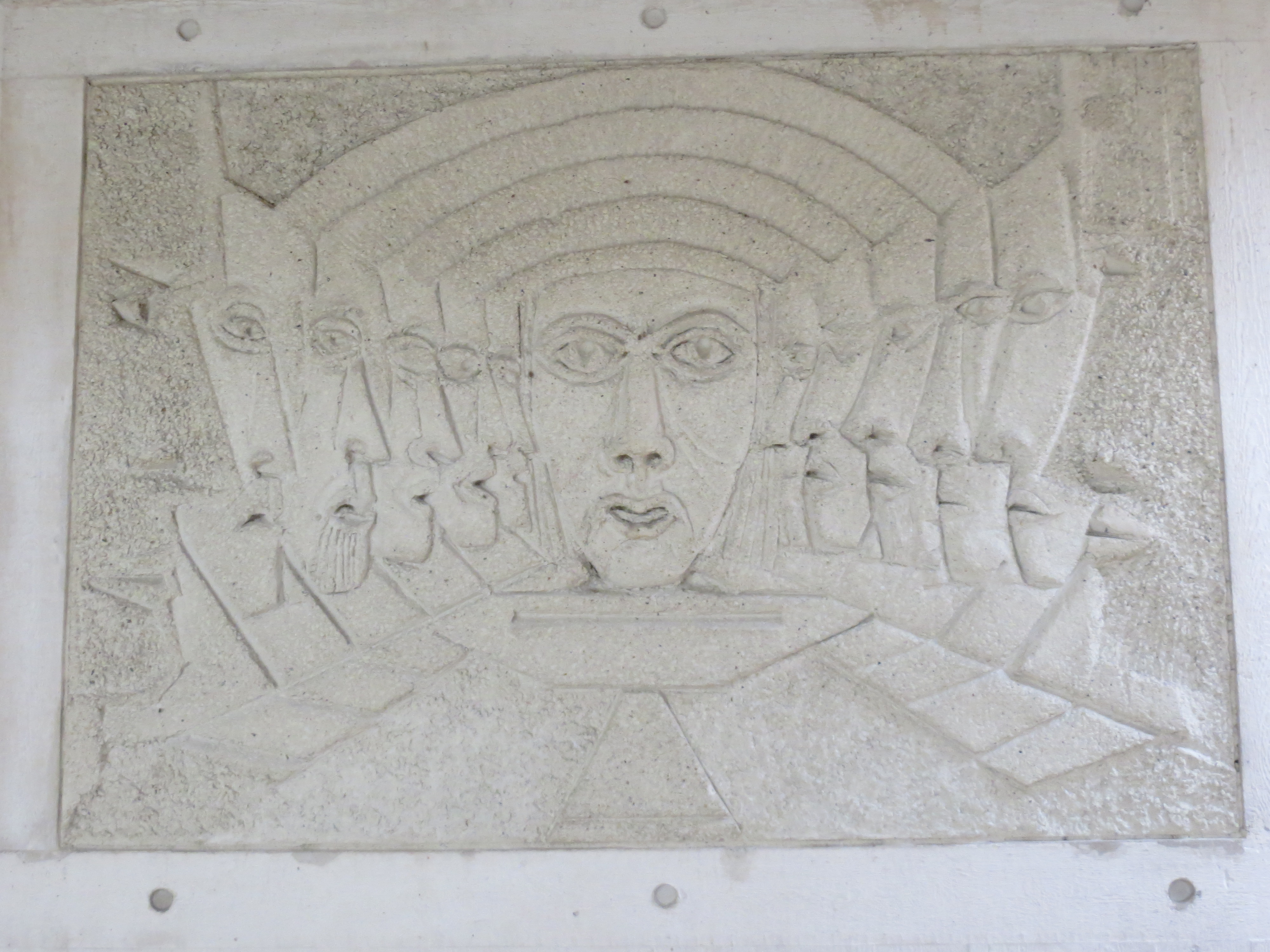
Stations of the Cross, William Mitchell – Jesus shares the Last Supper with his disciples

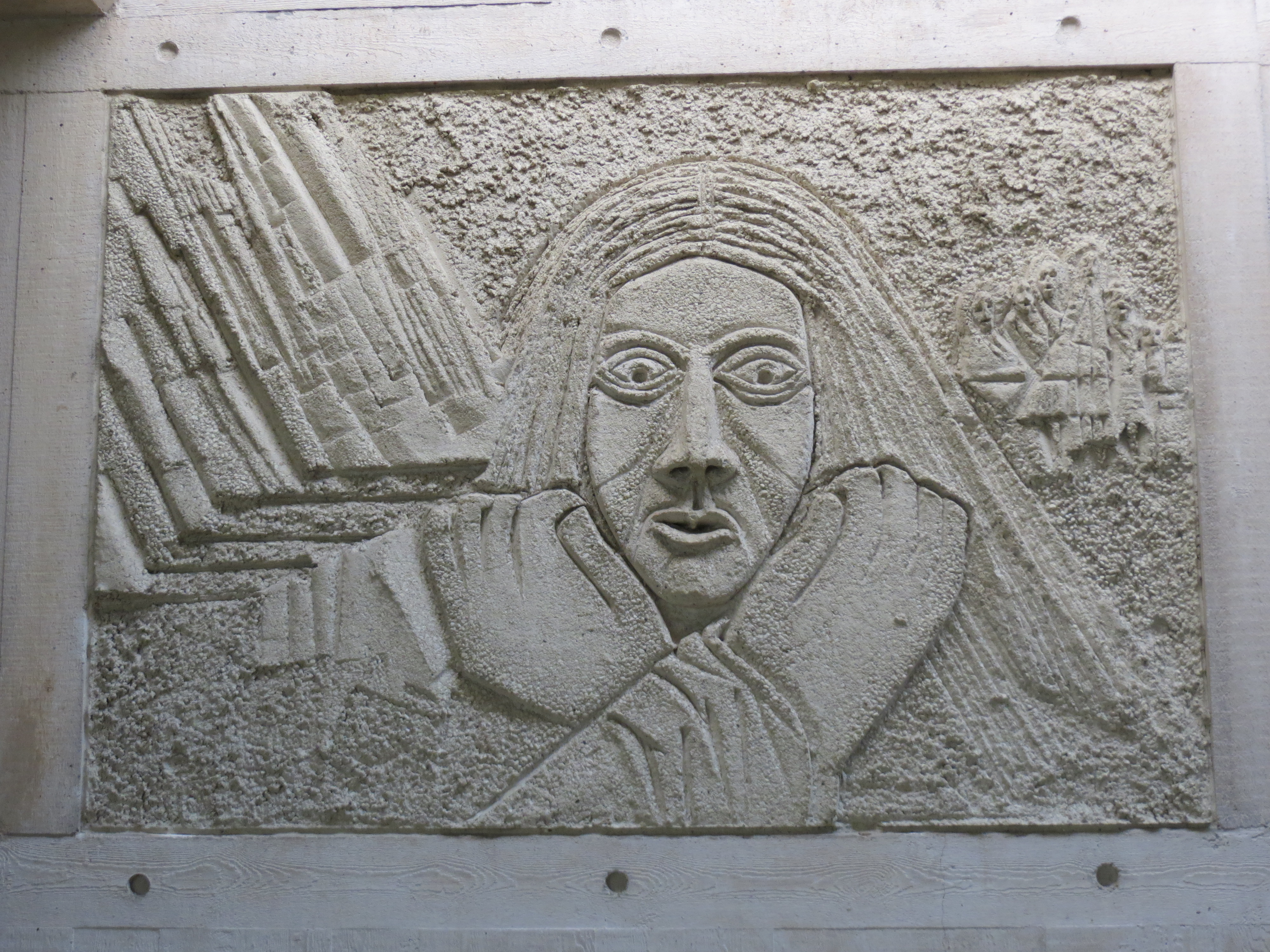
Stations of the Cross, William Mitchell – Jesus prays in the garden

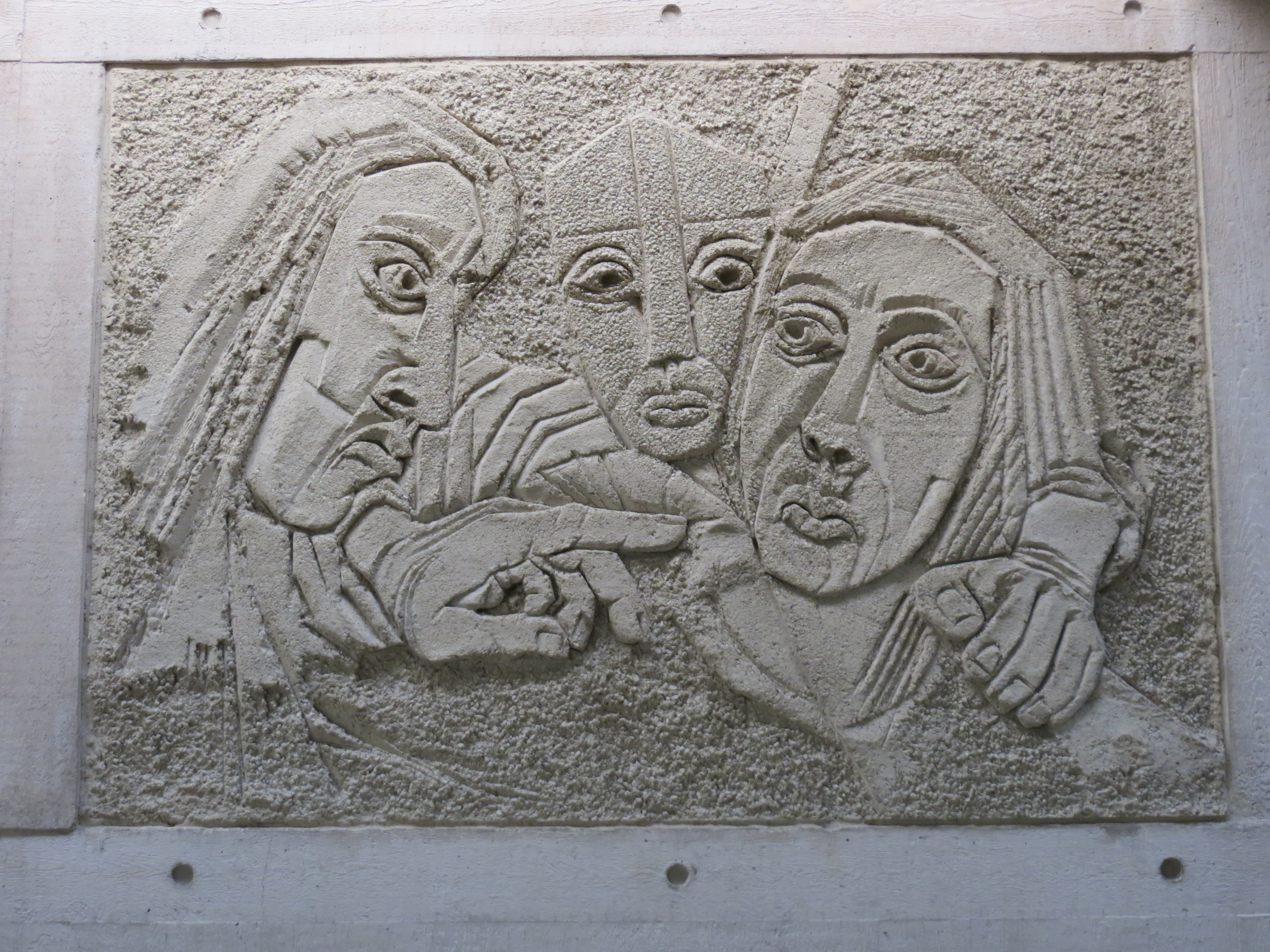
Stations of the Cross, William Mitchell – Jesus is betrayed and arrested

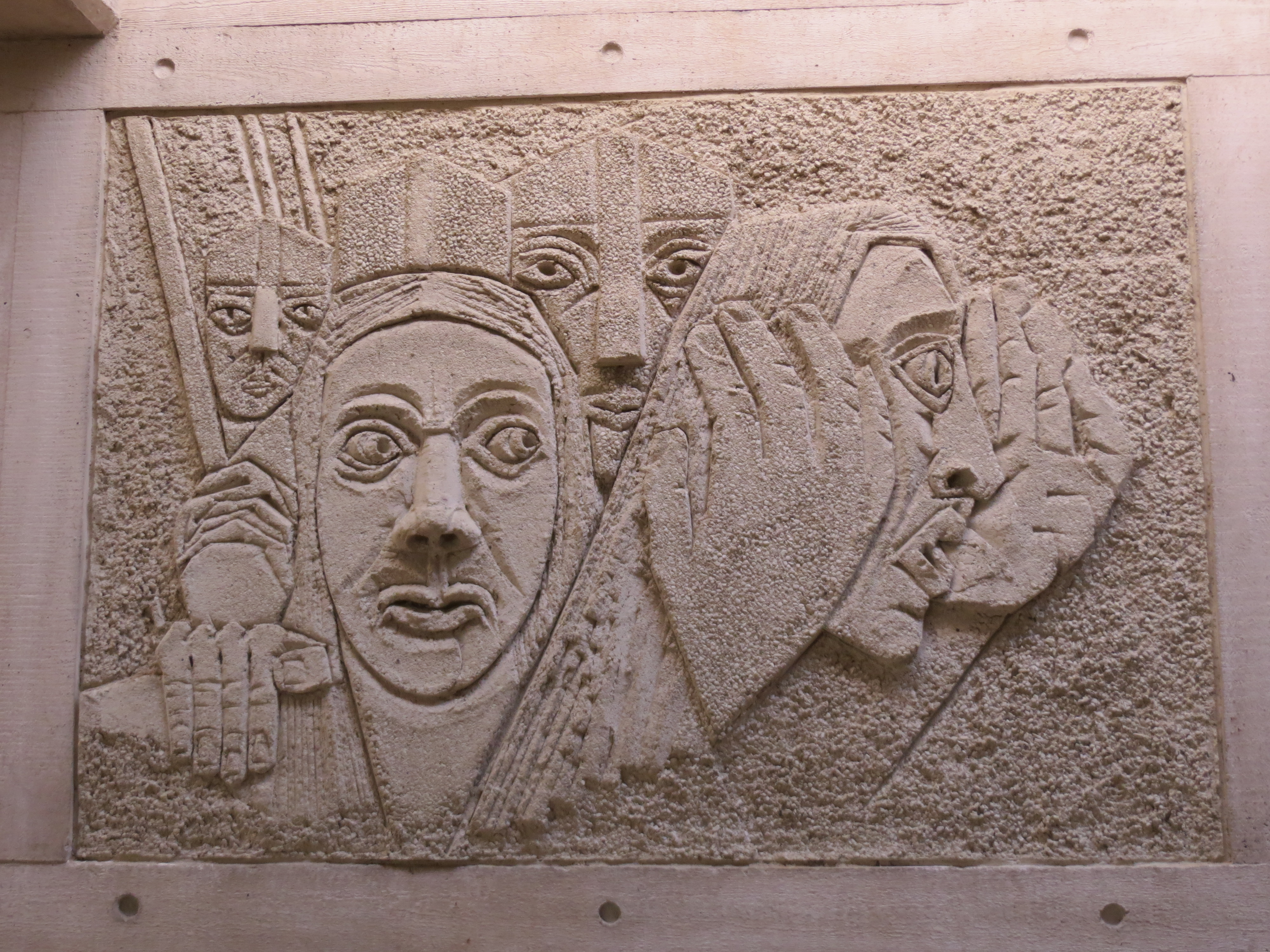
Stations of the Cross, William Mitchell – Jesus is disowned by Peter

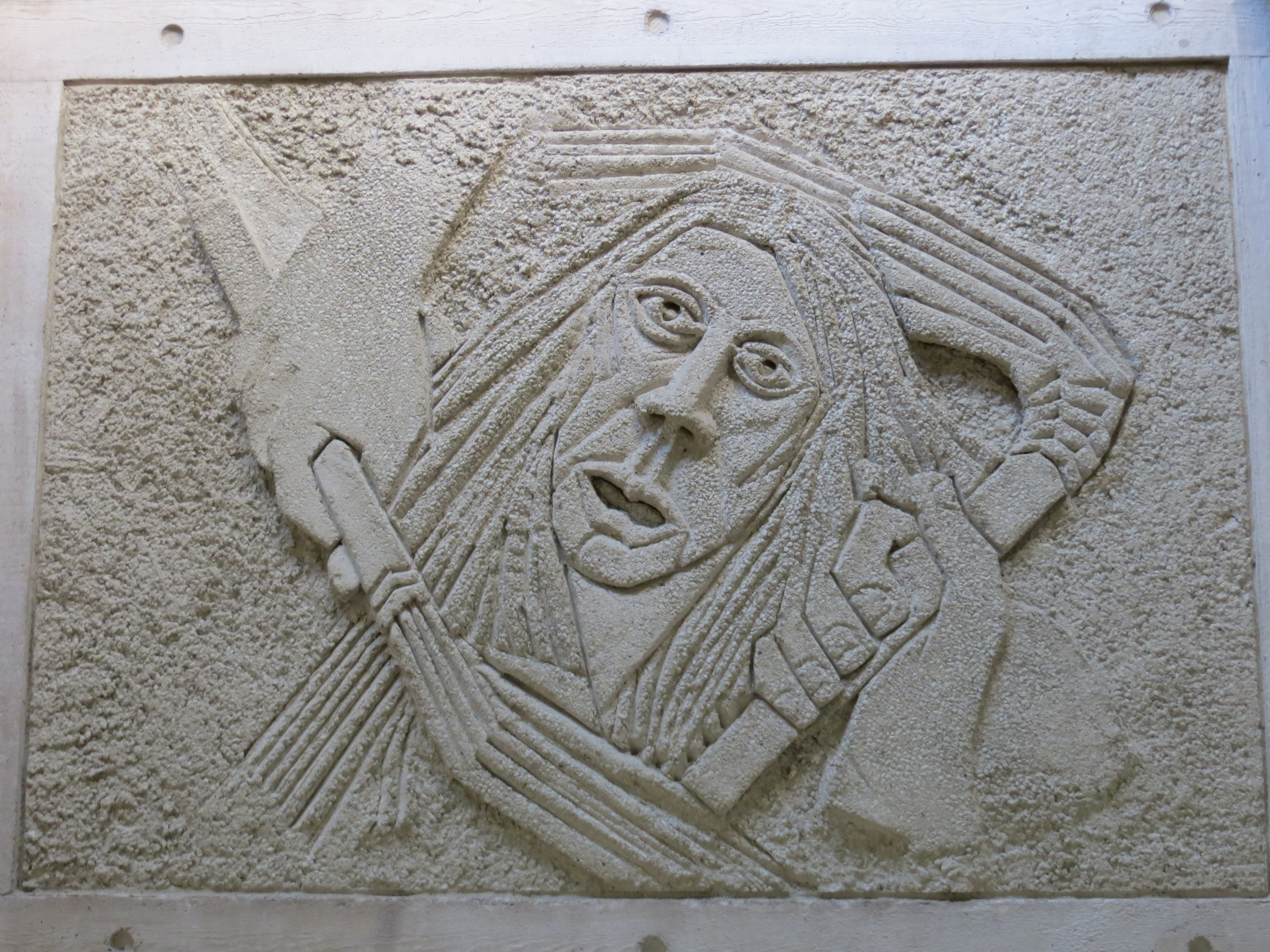
Stations of the Cross, William Mitchell – Jesus is scourged and mocked

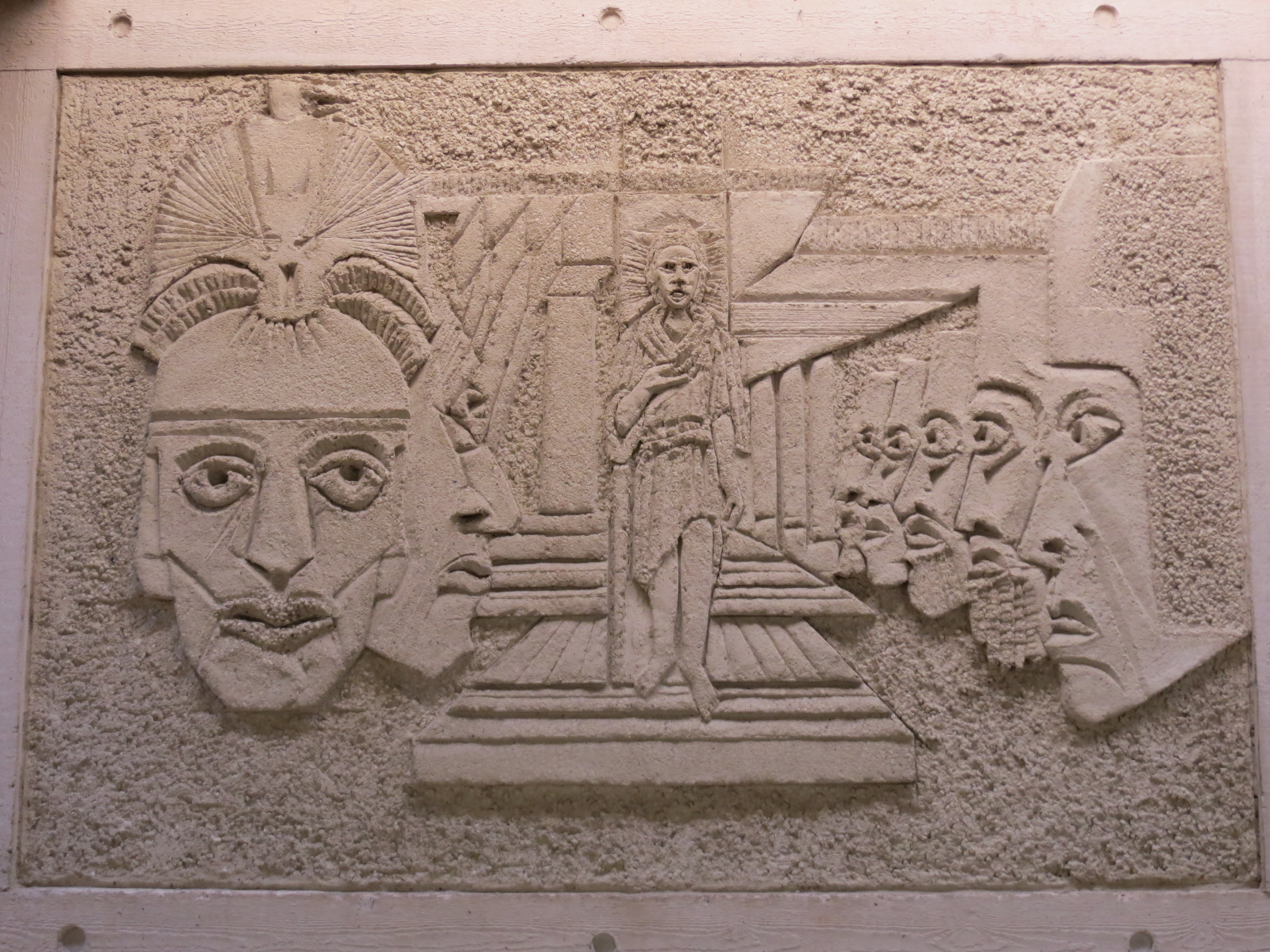
Stations of the Cross, William Mitchell – Jesus is condemned to death

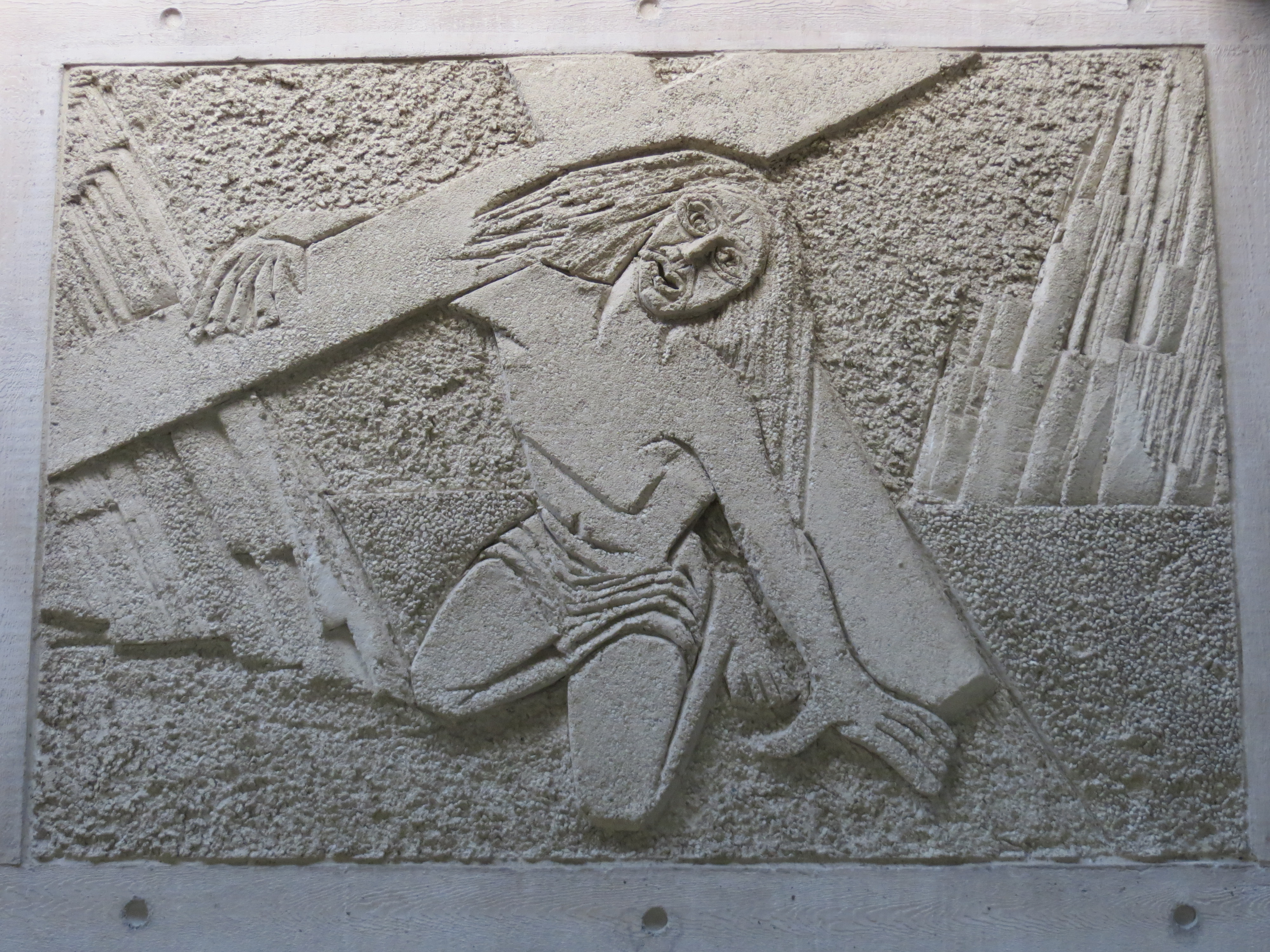
Stations of the Cross, William Mitchell – Jesus falls under his cross

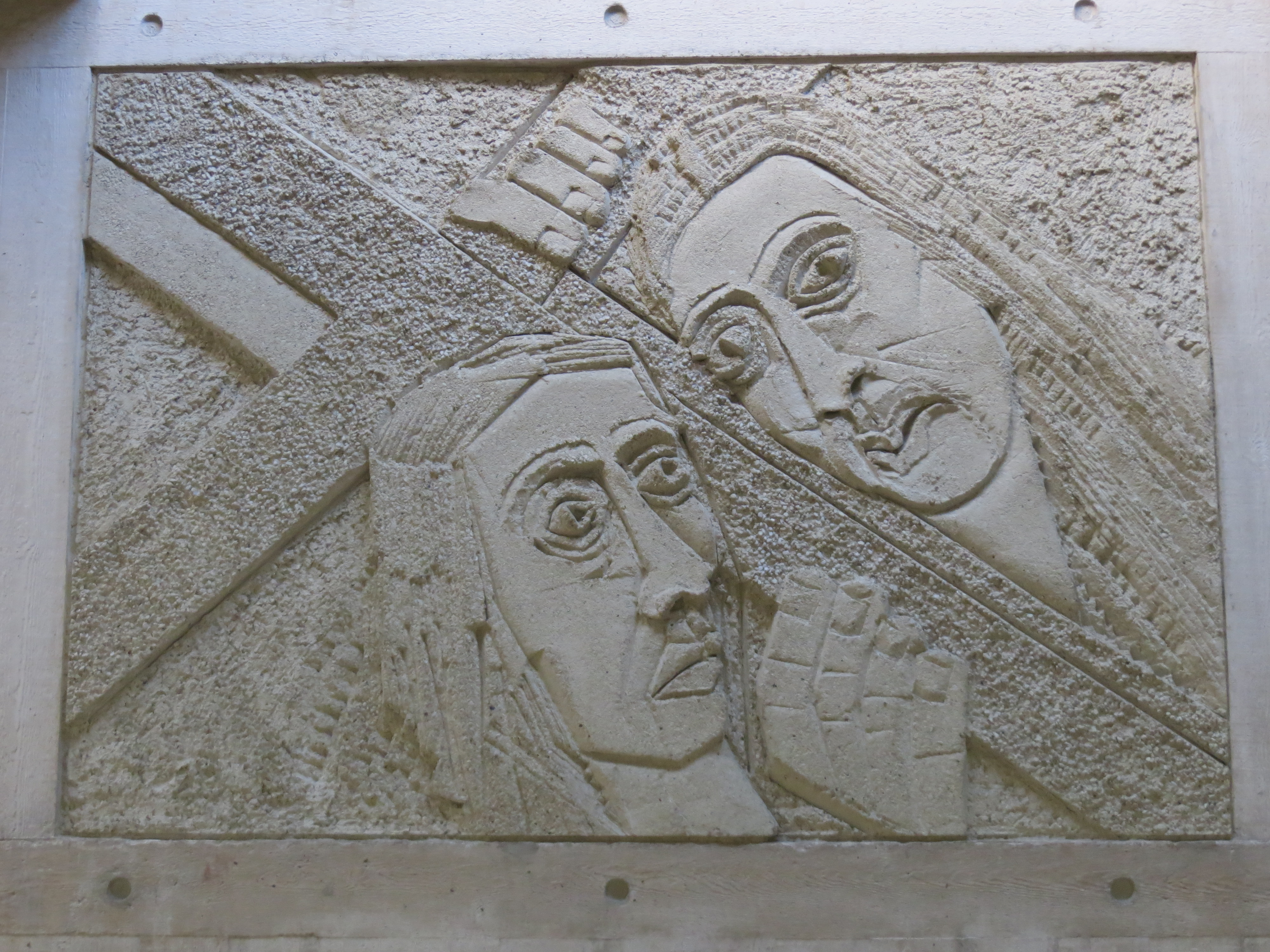
Stations of the Cross, William Mitchell – Jesus helped by Simon of Cyrene

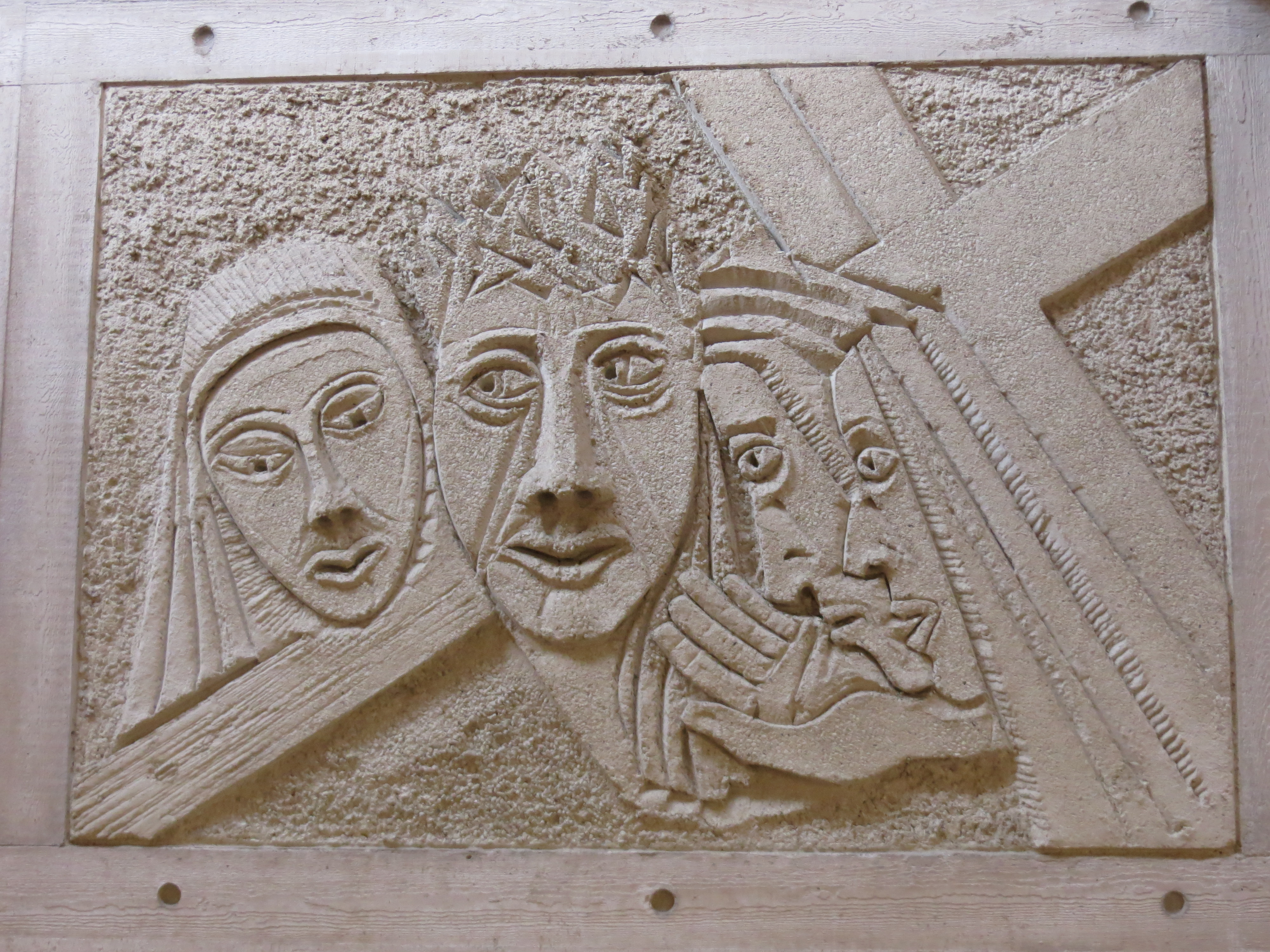
Stations of the Cross, William Mitchell – Jesus meets the women of Jerusalem

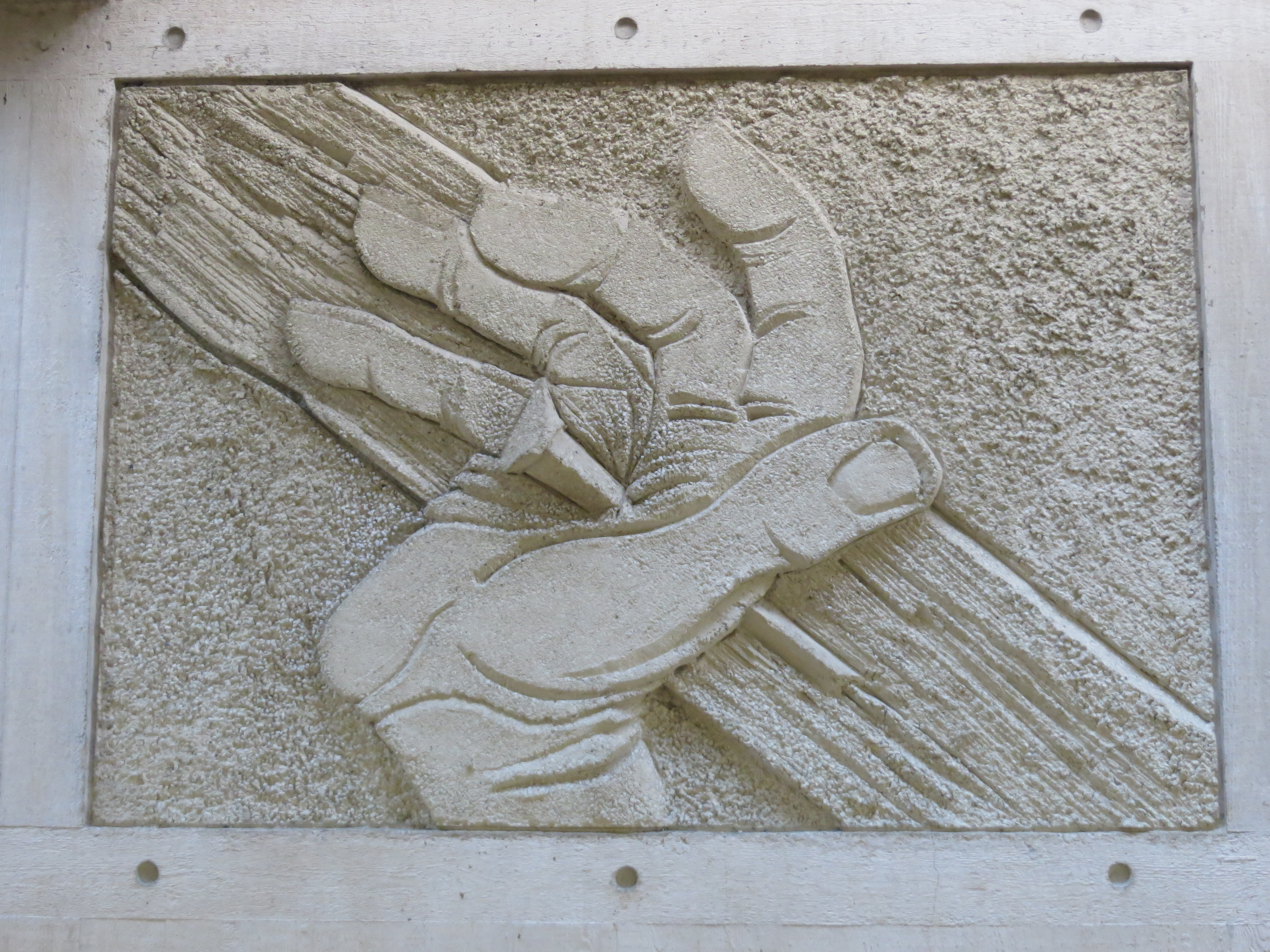
Stations of the Cross, William Mitchell – Jesus is nailed to the cross

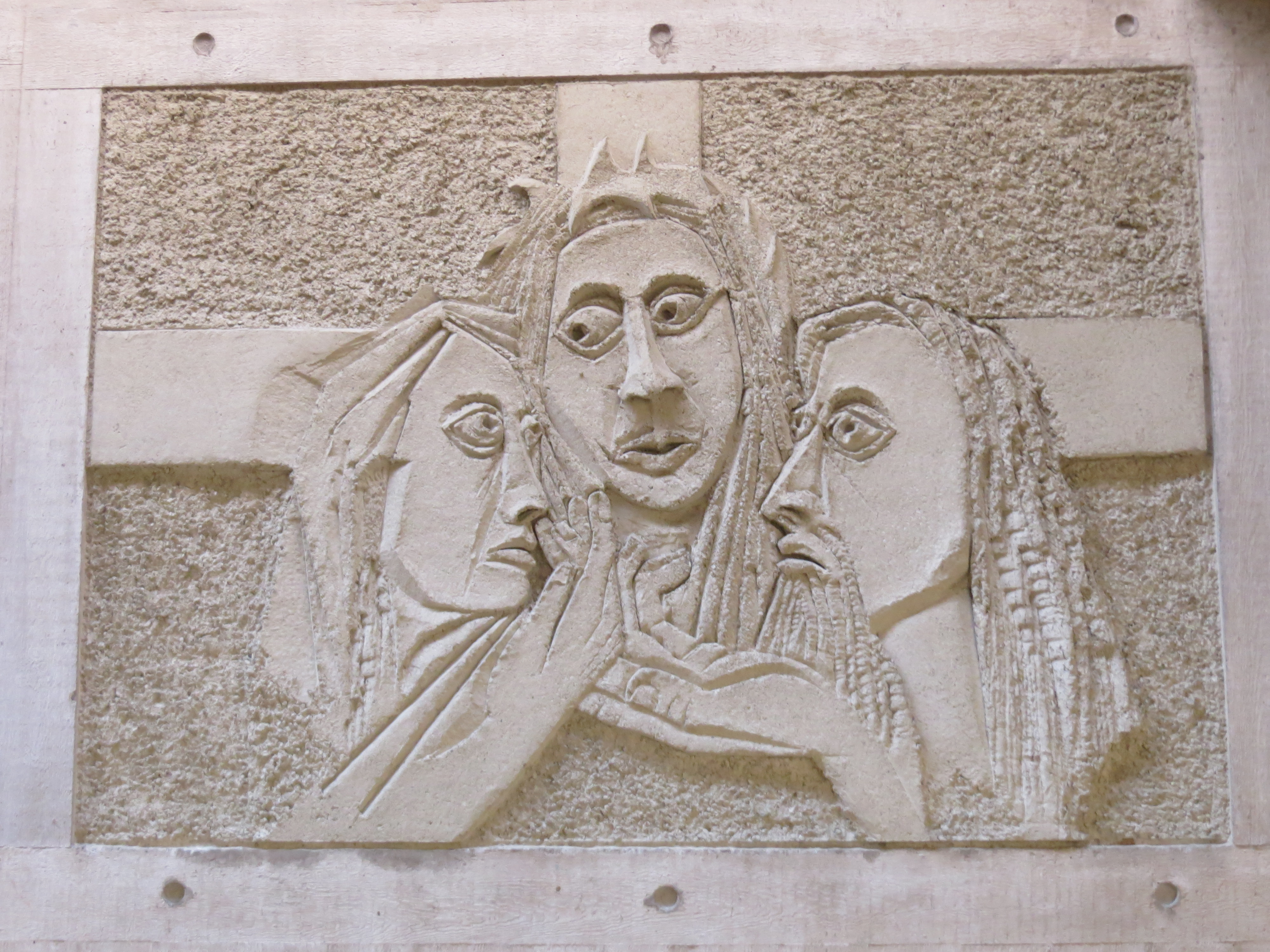
Stations of the Cross, William Mitchell – Jesus speaks to his mother

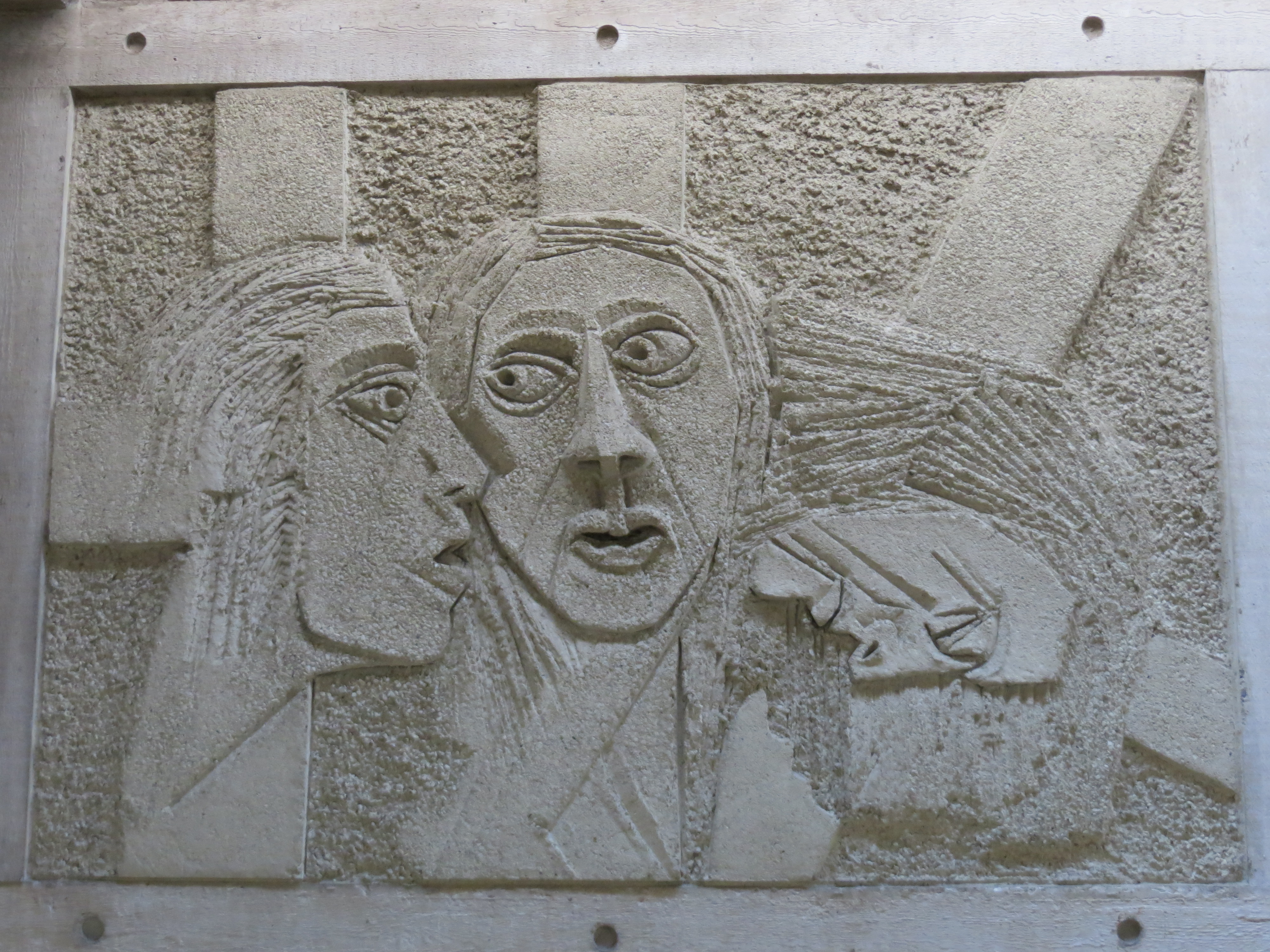
Stations of the Cross, William Mitchell – Jesus forgives the repentant thief

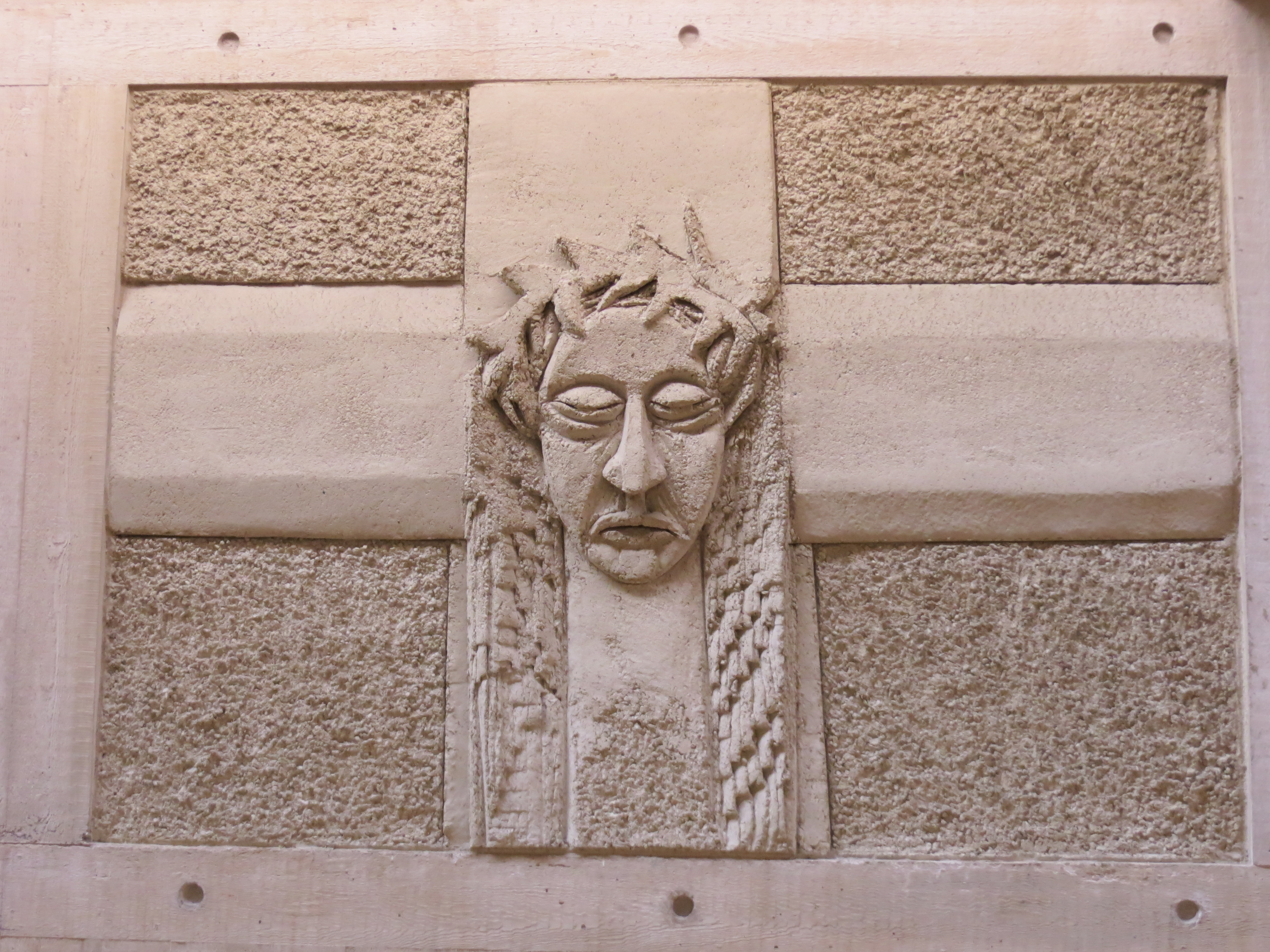
Stations of the Cross, William Mitchell – Jesus dies on the cross

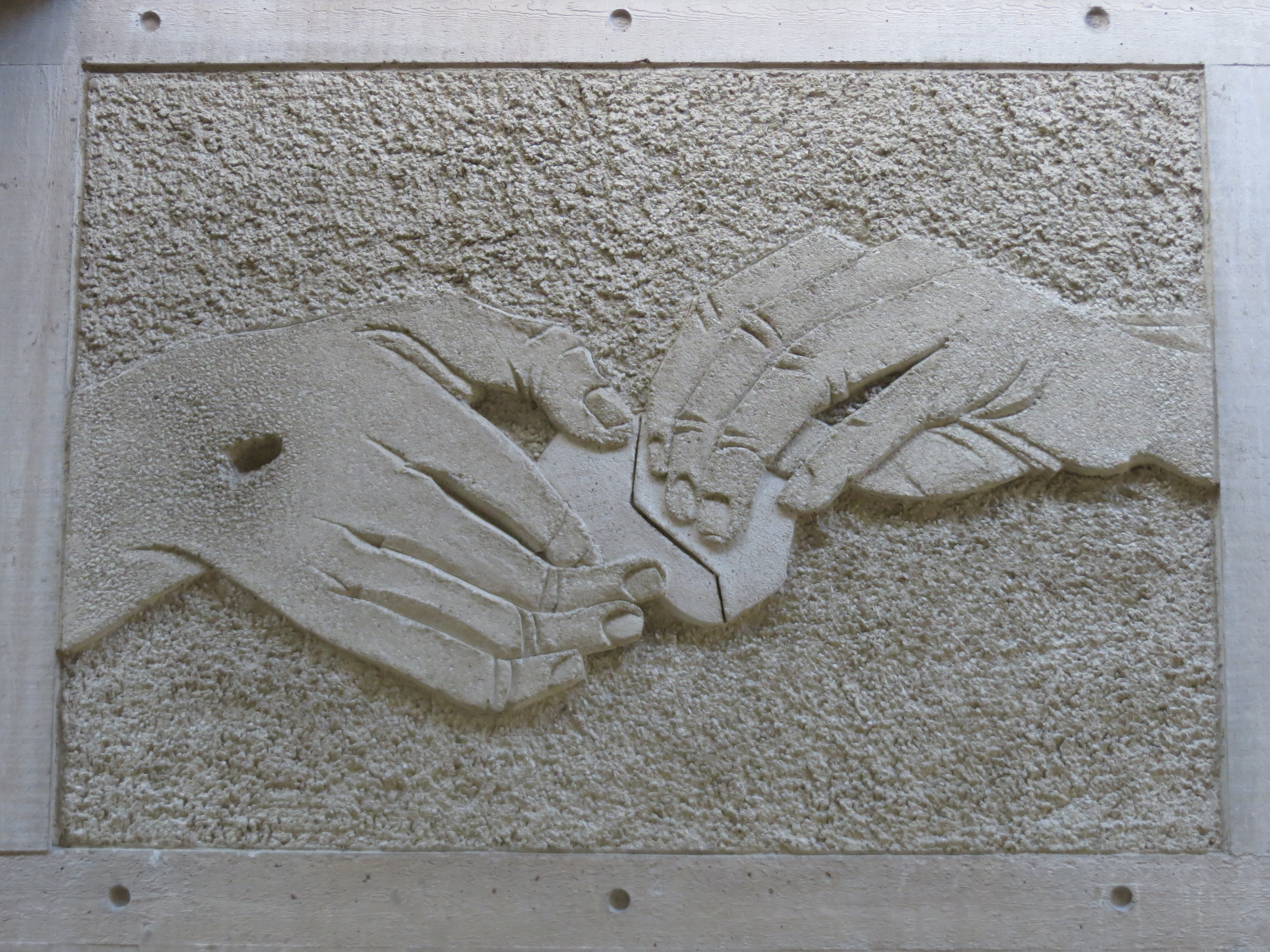
Stations of the Cross, William Mitchell – Jesus is Risen

=== Sacristy ===
Beyond the organ the ambulatory leads to the sacristy, which is used for storing vestments and for robing by the choir and clergy. It is not typically open to the public.

=== Lady Chapel ===
The Lady Chapel is off the ambulatory, near to the narthex [see Plan]. It is a chapel dedicated to Mary, Mother of Christ. Terry Jones, a young student of sculpture studying at the University of Swansea, was commissioned to fashion in bronze 'Mary the Woman of Faith' a simple design to reflect the deep significance of this woman as the Mother of God [G on Plan]. Rather than a queen dressed in finery, it depicts something closer to the truth: a simple peasant woman, without a young child in her arms.

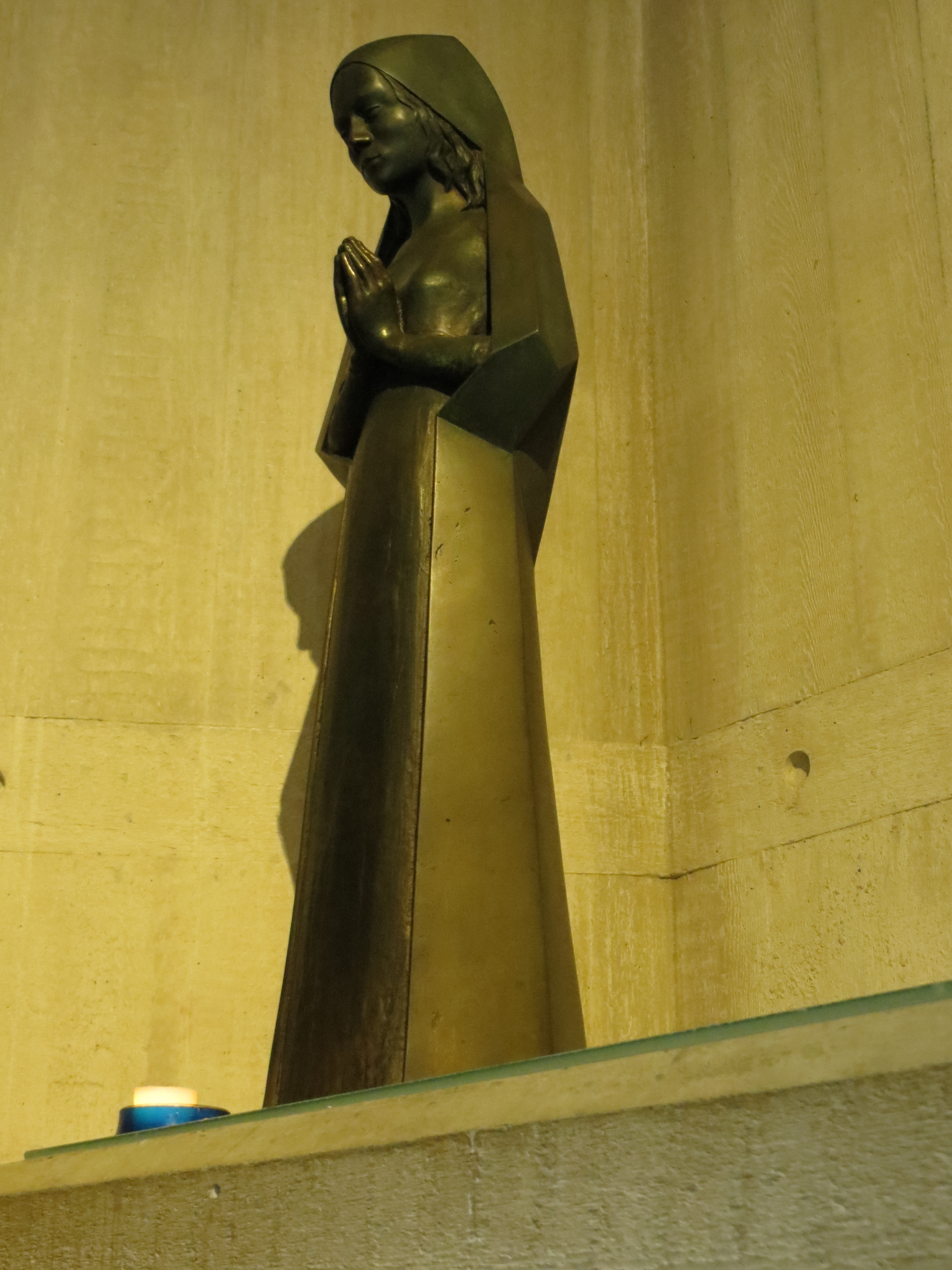
'Mary, the woman of Faith', bronze, by Terry Jones, Clifton Cathedral

The votive candelabra hanging in the Lady Chapel [H on Plan] is made from twenty stainless steel equilateral triangles (a regular icosahedron) and was designed and made by Brother Patrick, of Prinknash Abbey in Gloucestershire. It features in a pop music video (see Appearances in Media section).

Also in the Lady Chapel is a Lampedusa Cross [J on Plan]. This is made from wood from migrant boats destroyed in the Mediterranean and recovered from Lampedusa, Italy between 2012 and 2016. It is similar to the British Museum's Lampedusa Cross and is intended to reflect Pope Francis's 2017 'Share the Journey' exhortation for the Church to care for, and show solidarity to, all migrants and asylum seekers.

== 2015–2018 renovation ==
The 2015–2018 £3.1 million grant-funded renovation project (part-funded by £1.4m of grants from the World War I Centenary Cathedral Repairs Fund) was carried out by Bristol-based Purcell. It involved replacement of the lower, failed asphalt roofs and associated glazing, which were causing leaks and staining and risked closure of some areas of the building, as well as re-leading the higher roof with 86 tons (95 short tons, 77 long tons) of a thicker gauge of lead, and slight modifications to address leaks, working closely with the Lead Sheet Association to create long-lasting work that matched the building's historic aesthetic. Repairs were made to the cladding areas where pieces had flaked or chipped off, using Corennie granite chippings that matched the original materials. A hexagonal glass roof on the left-hand turret of the Portal of St Paul was added to accommodate the fire escape from the roof terrace above the Baptistery.

== Clifton International Festival of Music ==
The cathedral's 'acoustics are first-rate, making the venue a popular one for some of Europe's top classical ensembles.' The annual Clifton International Festival of Music started in 2013, showcasing classical, chamber and choral music. It has featured artists such as The Erebus Ensemble; Tom Williams (assistant director of Music at St Martin-in-the-Fields in London); The Tallis Scholars and the FIGO chamber group.

== Appearances in the media ==
As well as numerous appearances in radio religious broadcasts over the years:

- The cathedral interior was used as the set for the video of David Essex's UK Singles Chart Number 3 hit Oh! What A Circus (from the 1978 musical Evita by Andrew Lloyd Webber & Tim Rice). [Video available on YouTube]. The votive candelabra features heavily.
- 1 September 1974, 18:15–18:45 BBC1 Clifton Cathedral, (Narrator Derek Jones, Director Ruth Lovell, Producer James Dewar (BBC West)
- Appearances on BBC's Songs of Praise include:
  - 25 December 1980 10:00–11:15 BBC1 Morning Worship: from Clifton Cathedral
  - 16 September 1984 BBC1 Songs of Praise (video)
  - 24 December 1986 23.30-00:35 BBC1 The First Mass of Christmas: Clifton Cathedral
  - 20 May 2001 17:25-18.00 BBC1 Songs of Praise (Wendy Craig)
  - 9 September 2001 BBC1 Songs of Praise
  - 25 December 2005 BBC1 Christmas Day Service, 'Stranger in the Manger'
- In 2011, it hosted the filming of 'Dechrau Canu Dechrau Canmol' an S4C television programme, that translates as 'Start Singing Start Praising'. The cathedral hosted musicians, singers, cameramen and crew filming for the faith and music programme.
- On 14 July 2016. the cathedral was featured in a BBC Two documentary, The Hairy Builder, presented by Dave Myers.
- In 2020, the cathedral featured as the interior of Captain Jack's spaceship in the Doctor Who episode Fugitive of the Judoon
- The Cathedral hosted the live BBC TV broadcast of Midnight Mass on 24 December 2020, with Bishop Declan Lang presiding; Canon Bosco MacDonald preaching, and a specially written Mass setting (Missa Universalis) to comply with prevailing restrictions due to the coronavirus pandemic, composed by Richard Jeffrey-Gray.

== Archives ==
The archives of Clifton Cathedral, Bristol are held at Bristol Archives (Ref. 38031) (online catalogue), including registers of baptisms, marriages, confirmations, burials and members. The archive also includes notices of banns and minutes of the deanery.

== The parish ==
The cathedral welcomes visitors of all denominations, or none, and is usually open during daylight hours. Please respect the dignity of the building, and any ongoing services.

As of March 2021, mass times are as follows:

- Weekdays 09:30
- Saturday 10:30, 18:00 (Vigil Mass)
- Sunday 08:00, 09:30 (Family Mass), 11:15 (Solemn Mass), 18:00
- Masses at St Joseph's Home: Monday-Saturday 10:30, Sunday 11:00, Exposition 16:30, Evening Prayer 15:00

== Views of the cathedral architecture ==
=== Awards ===
In 1974 'The Concrete Society' bestowed its annual award on the cathedral in recognition of outstanding merit in the quality of the design and execution of the cathedral. The judges praised the interior as: 'A masterpiece of design – only to be achieved in concrete – with form and material and good acoustics creating an atmosphere which most would find totally satisfying. It is a building where design and execution have gone hand in hand to create architecture. No other material could have been used to such effect.' In 2007 the cathedral was awarded the 'Winner of Winners' Award. Martin Powell, chief executive of The Concrete Society, said: 'Clifton Cathedral has a pleasing external appearance with little evidence of weathering or deterioration. Internally, the appearance is striking with excellent use of natural light on exposed concrete finishes, such as board mark and other patterned forms creating relief pictures.'

The Royal Institute of British Architects made an award in recognition of the outstanding architectural design of the cathedral It also received a Cembureau award for excellence.

=== Expert opinions ===
'A heart-lifting Christian temple, inspiring reverence but not awe. A sermon in concrete.'

Historic England, listing the cathedral as Grade II* Listed said: 'Clifton Cathedral achieves a rare integration of materials and spatial quality which is remarkable for a cathedral of any period.' 'The Percy Thomas Partnership produced a powerful and dramatic building, which is perhaps the most important work of one of Britain's largest post-war architectural practices'

LAB, an offshoot of the Pevsner Architectural Guides, said:

'Clifton Cathedral was beset with constraints: a small four acre site; an unpromising suburban context; and a small budget (c. £600,000 – the result was called the "ecclesiastical bargain of the 1970s"). Despite or because of these, and in less than eight years from commissioning to consecration, the architects and craftsmen produced a church of superlative quality. Paradoxically the structure is of considerable three-dimensional complexity, and yet the simple spatial arrangement is understandable the moment one enters the building. It attains a mystic simplicity through careful use of humble materials and masterly manipulation of light'

George Perkin in Concrete Quarterly described it as 'having a remarkable serenity and delight' coupled with 'an apparent simplicity'.

Mary Haddock, in Building admired 'the hint of theatre in the design; the absence of clutter and garish church ornament; the fine materials and the use of colour; the cold design in stained glass.'

Vladimir Kulić said:

'The interior of Clifton Cathedral has a quality of openness rather like that of Liverpool [cathedral], but this was intended to allow fluid movement between different areas, and the liturgical elements seem more definitely fixed and appropriate to their allotted places.'... ' At Liverpool, the interior is cluttered with indecisive liturgical furnishings but these can easily ignored as the scale and from the space...predominate. At Clifton, the various elements of the interior are coherently placed and legible.'

Andrew Derrick said:

'By contrast [to Brentwood Cathedral, consecrated 1991] the Percy Thomas Partnership's concrete brutalist cathedral at Clifton was more monumental and permanent in character, betraying no suggestion of diffidence, and following a clearly determined post-conciliar liturgical programme.' 'From the 1970s, one [church] building, Clifton Cathedral, is Grade II* (Listed)'

Dr Robert Proctor says:

'Clifton Cathedral has recently been accused of being a 'relativist' and people-centred space, but the experience of the building rebuffs such charges as unfounded – its nave is focused on the sanctuary, and subsidiary spaces fixed in liturgically and symbolically appropriate places; ritual movement is woven into its architectural fabric; light and height give glimpses of transcendence and a clear sense of hierarchy.'

and in a later book:

'Liverpool Cathedral is something of an architectural precedent for Clifton, especially in the treatment of the podium (Weeks had entered the competition). Inside, the concrete trusses (sic, actually a star beam) over the sanctuary recall the cut-out beams at S. Maria dei Poveri in Milan; and the informal hexagonal geometry is typical of its period. But there is not much point looking for visual precedents with a building so clearly founded on a careful analysis of liturgical function.'...'If the suspicion remains that Clifton Cathedral is not quite as beautiful or exciting as it could have been, it is undeniably intelligent and valuable. Its owners seem to have changed very little in the building in thirty-four years... if Clifton's exterior is, "gaunt and forbidding", as one Catholic newspaper described it, "will not satisfy everyone's picture of what a church should look like", but... the interior and its spatial organisation function took precedence, while the exterior showed that the building was merely an envelope around the real human and divine Church that manifested itself in liturgical action.'

Ray Newman, on brutalism says:

'Bristol's brutalist buildings, as well as being a pragmatic response to the post-war need to build quickly and cheaply, are powerful, sometimes even a beautiful presences in the cityscape... Among Bristol's most exciting buildings of any style or vintage is the Roman Catholic Cathedral of Saints Peter and Paul in Clifton by Percy Thomas & Son. The thrusting spaceship-like spire can be seen for miles around and the more-or-less hexagonal church was apparently unpopular with conservation minded locals and worshippers when it arrived from its home planet in 1974. It was built using especially fine, pale concrete and so hasn't aged as poorly as some similar buildings.'

== Gallery ==
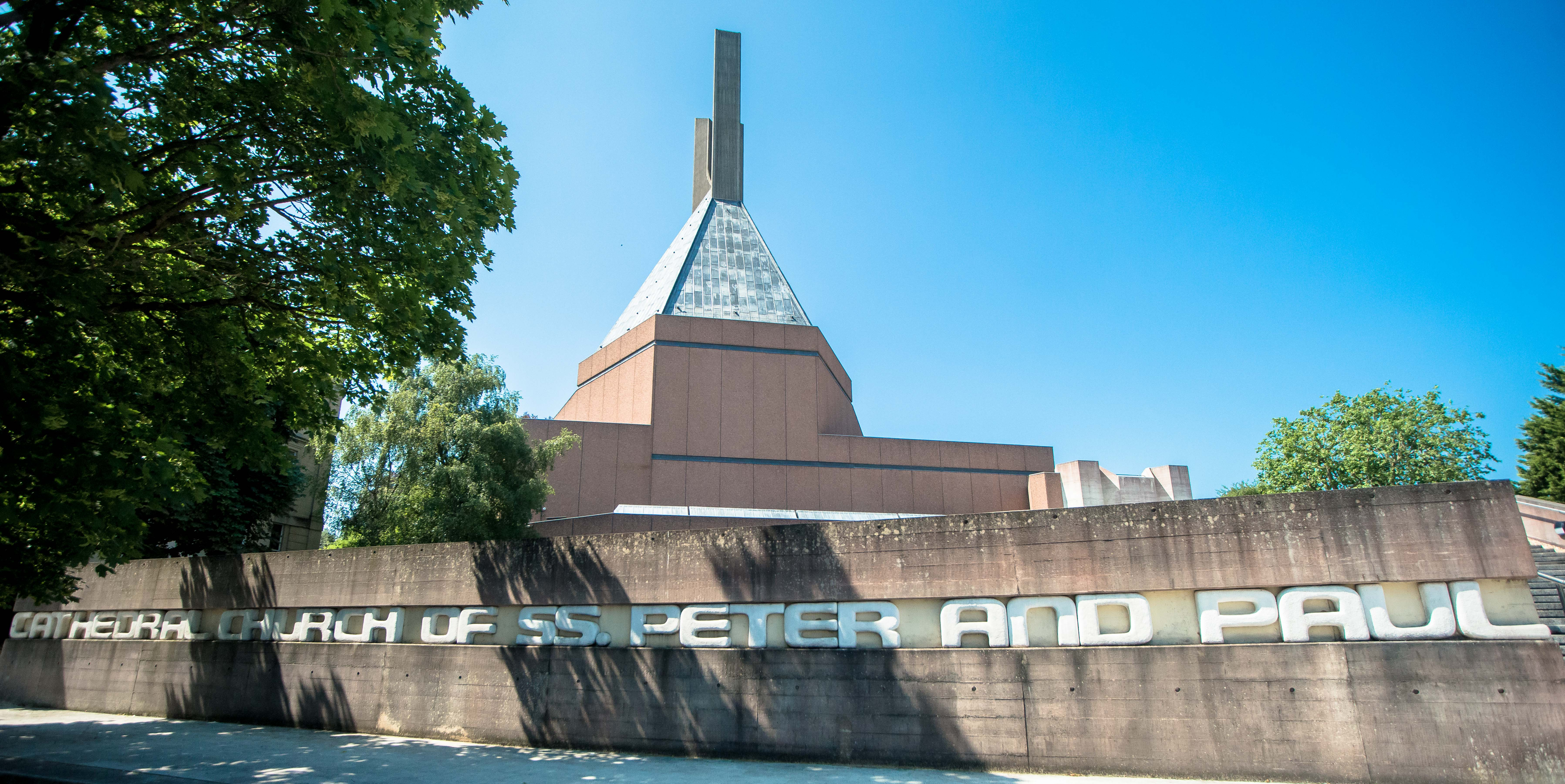
Clifton Cathedral seen from Pembroke Rd

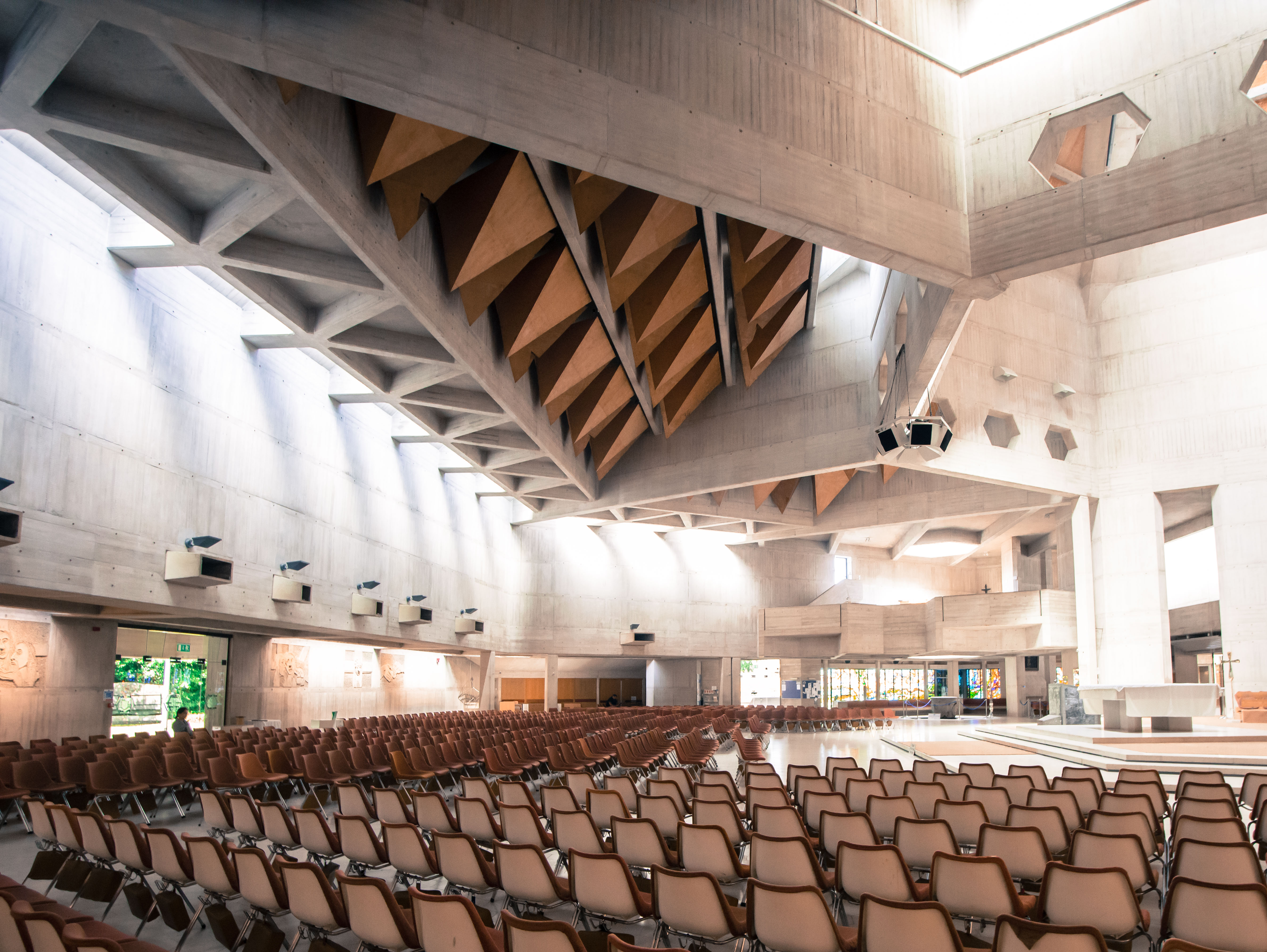
Nave of Clifton Cathedral, looking toward baptistery

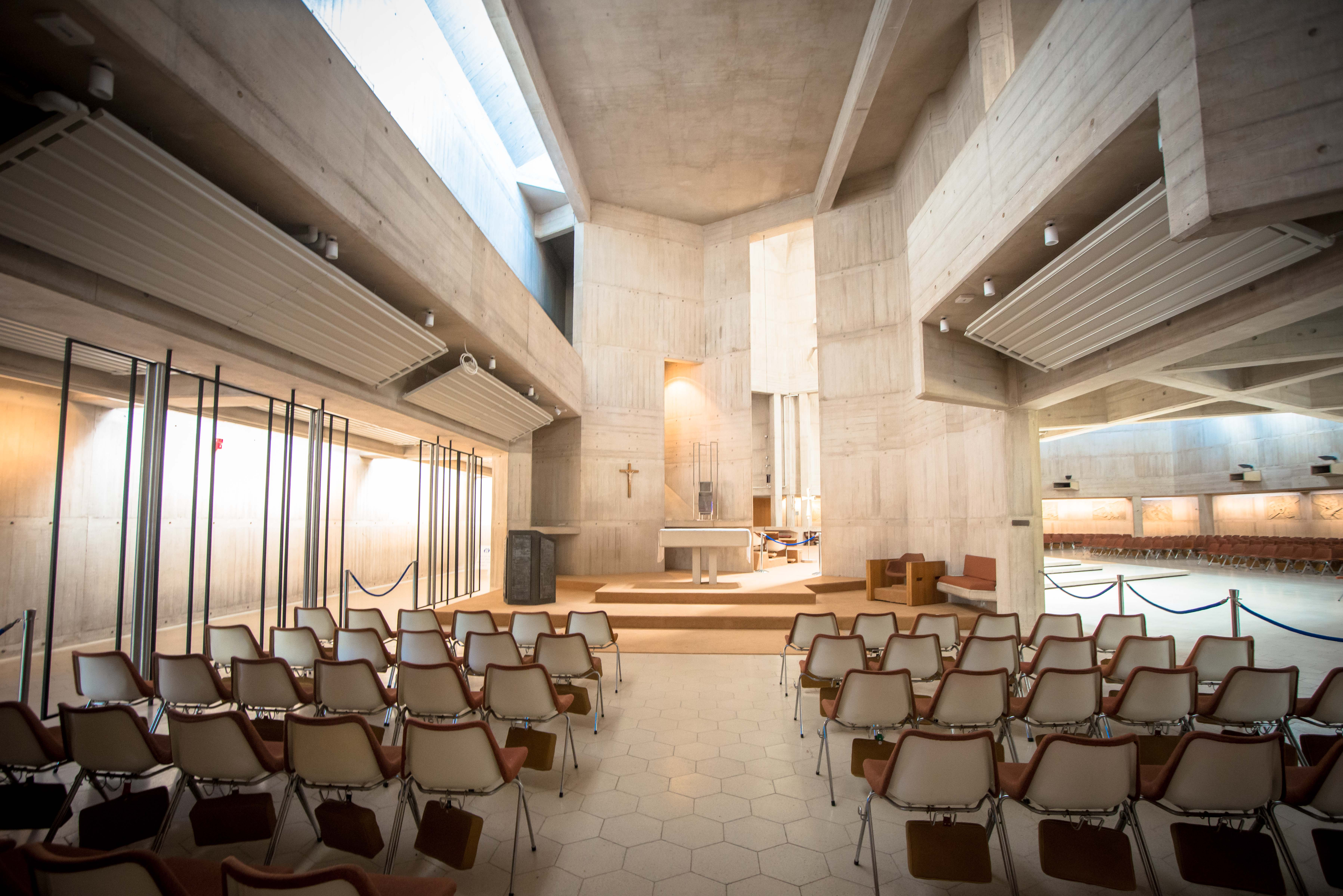
Blessed Sacrament Chapel

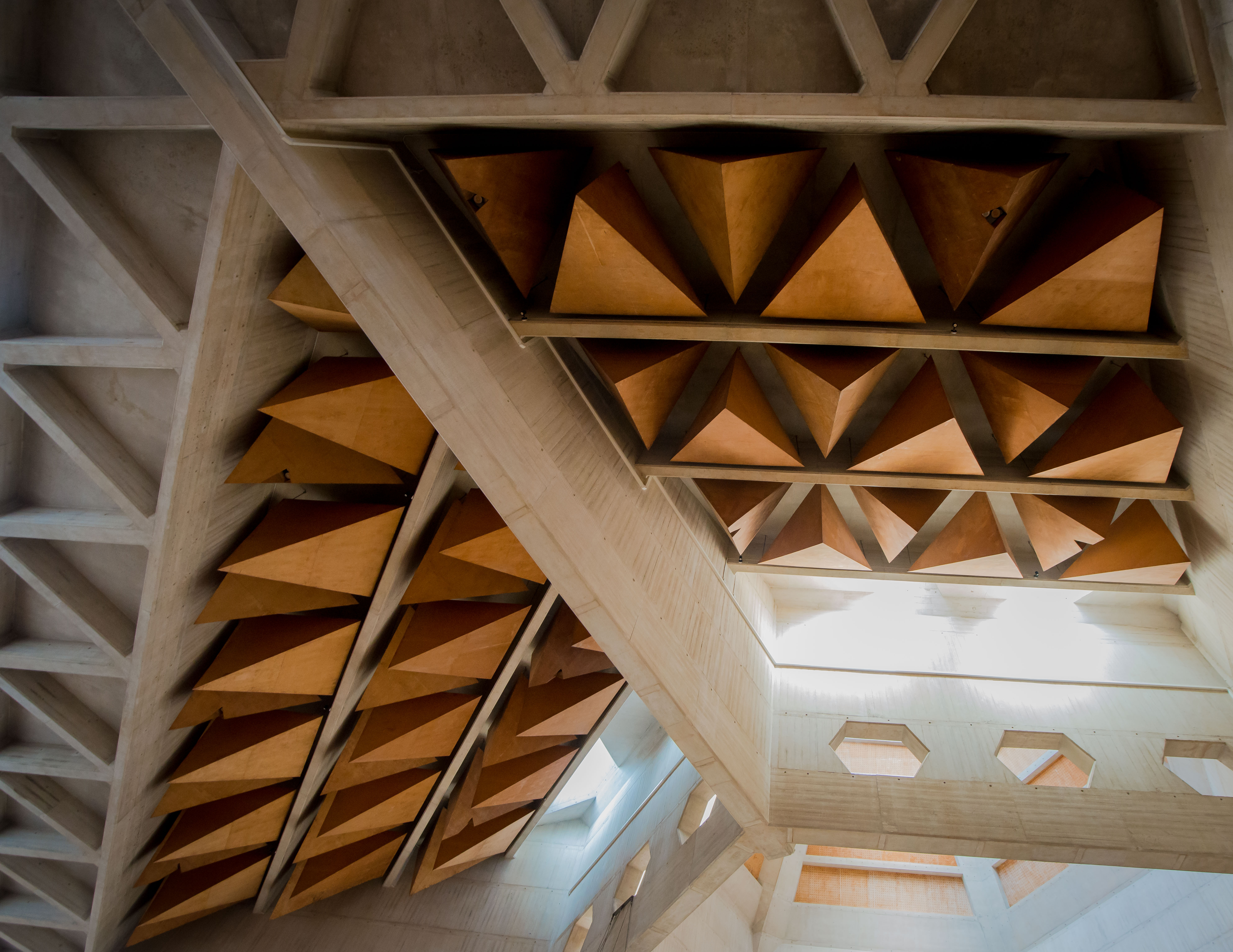
Concrete structures and acoustic baffles in roof of nave

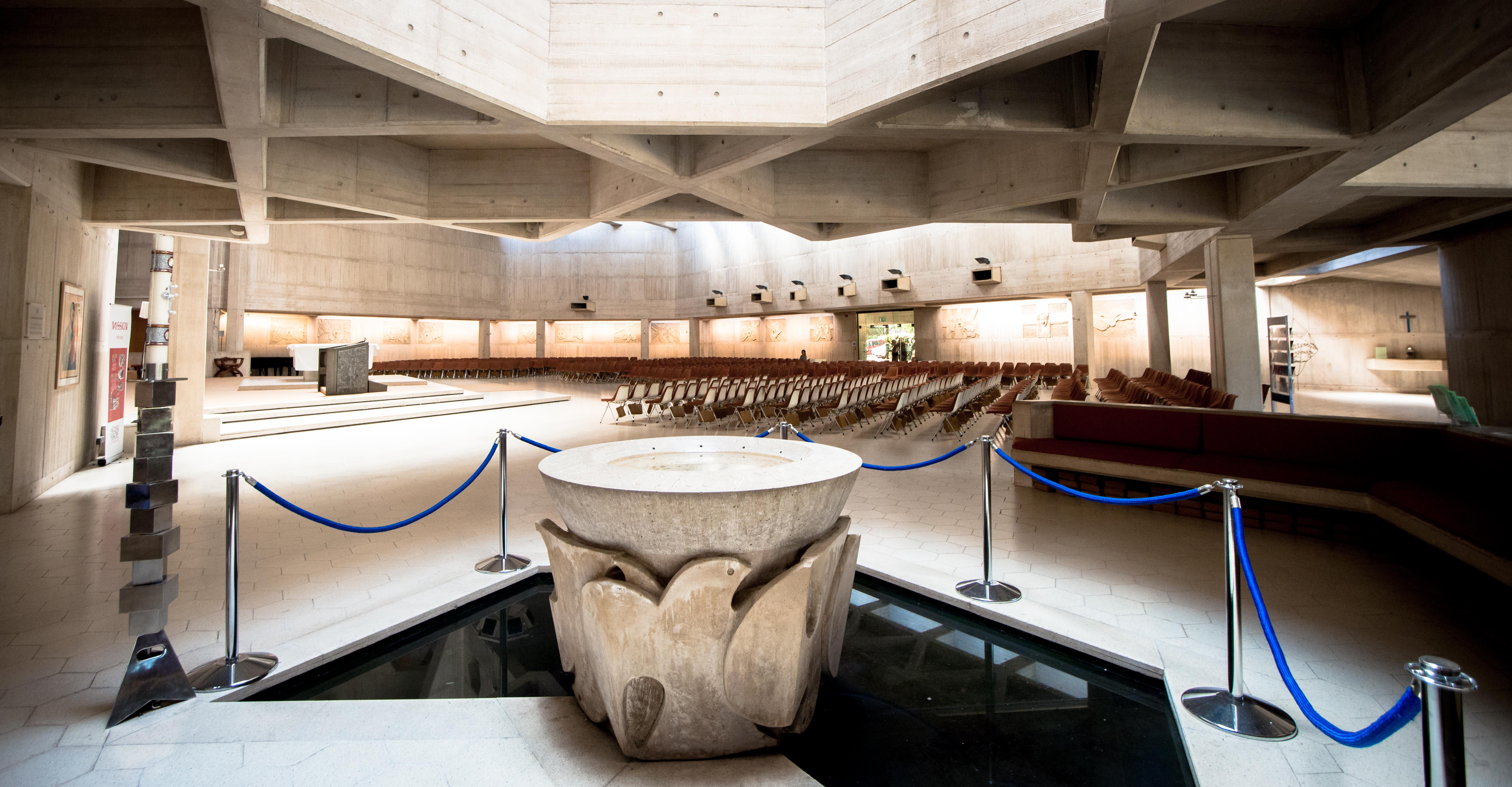
Font by Simon Verity, Paschal candle stand by Ronald Weeks (left), within baptistery, looking towards nave

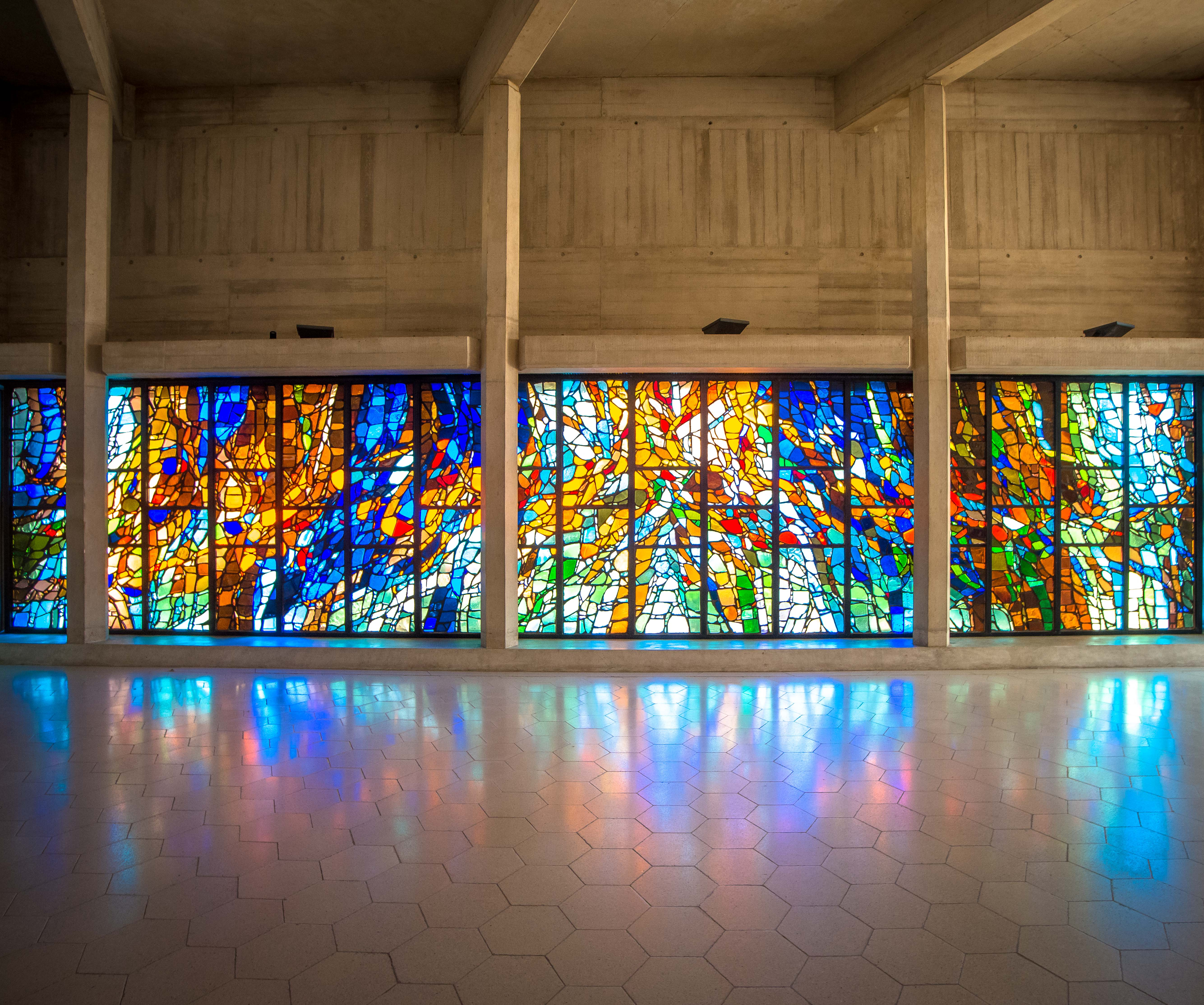
Narthex windows by Henry Haig

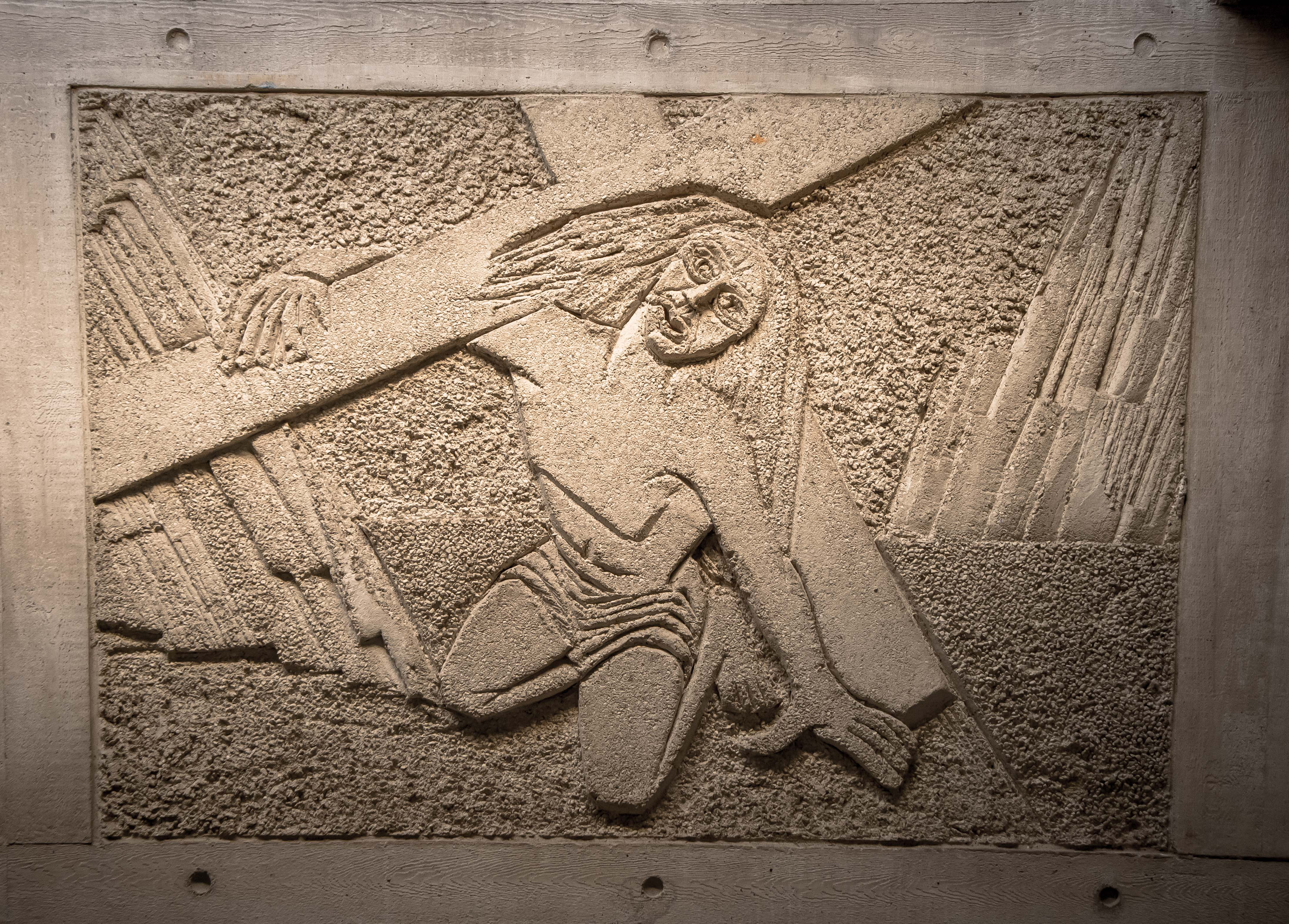
Station of the Cross by William Mitchell

== See also ==
- Bishop of Clifton
- Diocese of Clifton
- List of churches in Bristol
