= North Watford =

Area of Watford, Hertfordshire, England

Coordinates: 51.673°N 0.39°W

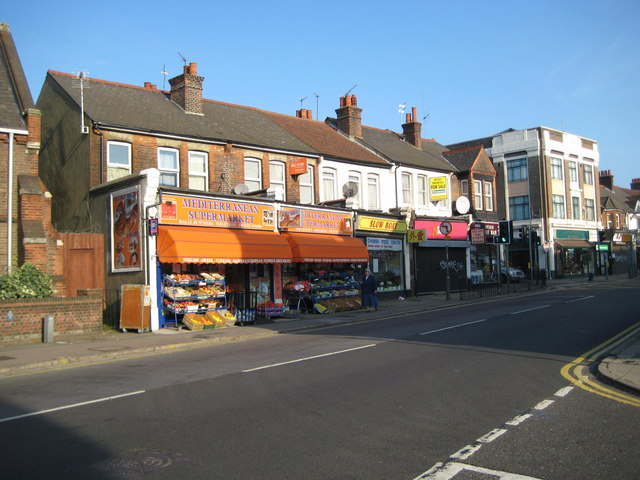
- 19th century houses & shopfronts on the St Albans Road, the area's main thoroughfare

- Location within Hertfordshire
- Population: 33,000
- OS grid reference: TQ108987
- District: Watford
- Shire county: Hertfordshire
- Region: East
- Country: England
- Sovereign state: United Kingdom
- Post town: WATFORD
- Postcode district: WD24
- Dialling code: 01923
- Police: Hertfordshire
- Fire: Hertfordshire
- Ambulance: East of England
- UK Parliament: Watford

North Watford is an area in the town of Watford, Hertfordshire, in the United Kingdom. It is now primarily a residential area which developed as a result of expansion from the town during the 19th century.

== Location ==
North Watford is situated between Watford town centre and Garston. The area of North Watford is not officially defined, but is generally understood as the area north of Watford Junction railway station. North Watford roughly corresponds to the boundaries of three electoral wards in Watford, Leggatts, Callowland and Tudor Wards. Together, they form a triangular area bounded to the south west by the West Coast Main Line, to the north by the A41 road (North Western Avenue) and to the south east by the River Colne, with the southern edge running along Colne Way and across the industrial areas north of Watford Junction station.

== History ==
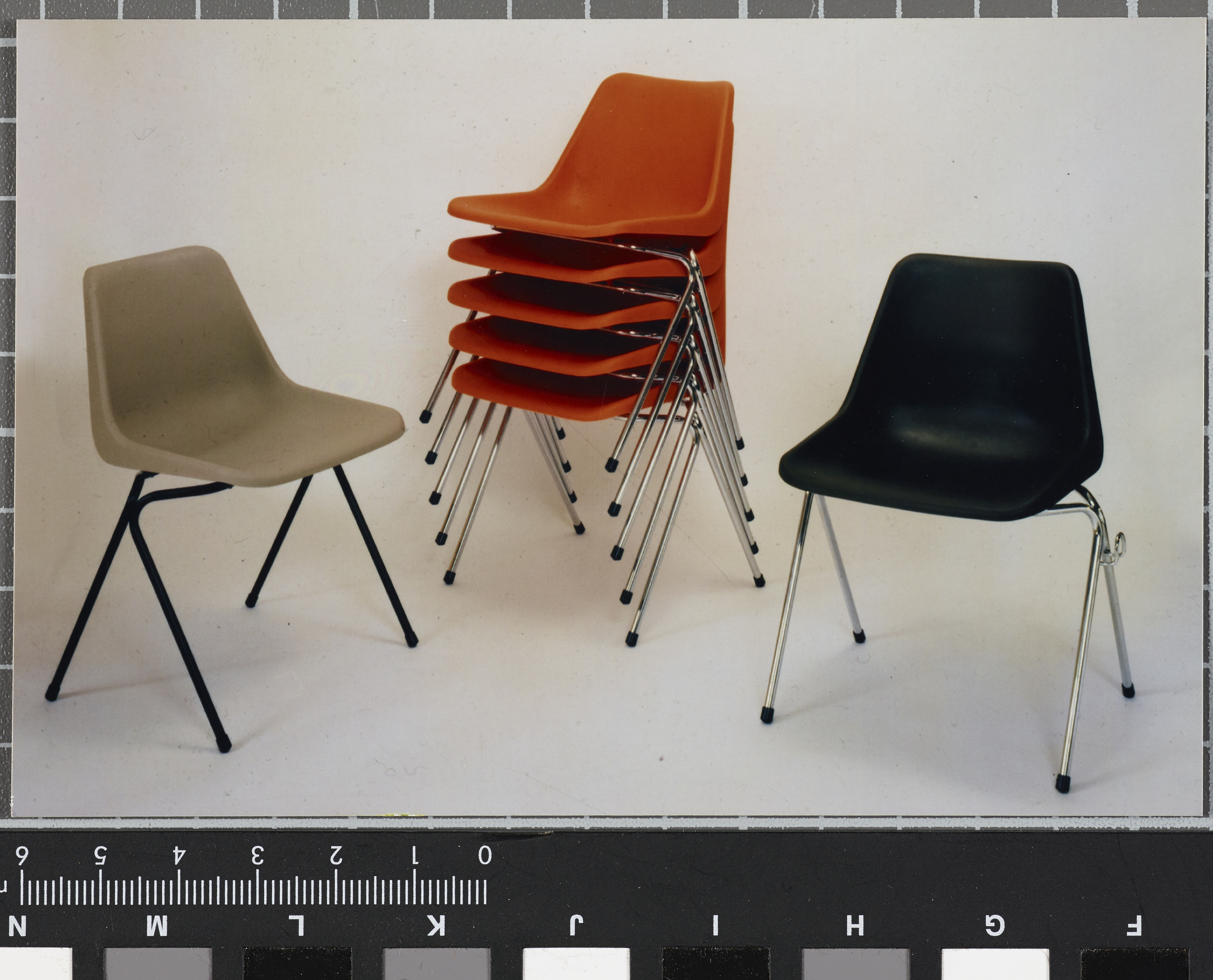
Robin Day's Polyprop Chair, designed in Watford

The earliest record for the town of Watford documents a charter granted by King Henry I to hold a market in Watford. Until the 19th century, Watford was a small town and the area to the north Watford was little more than farmland and manorial estates, owned by the Earls of Essex and the Earls of Clarendon. Census documents from the 1880s show that much of the farmland belonged to Callowland Farm and Bushey Hall Farm.

In 1833 the London and Birmingham Railway began to construct its new long-distance railway line through Watford which opened in 1838 between London Euston and Boxmoor. The advent of the railway improved links to London and other cities and made Watford attractive to industry; as a result, the need for more housing increased and the land usage in North Watford was given over to house building. In 1881 Callowland was purchased by the Earl of Essex from the Master and Fellows of Merton College, Oxford, and housing development began in the 1890s. The area was given the name of Watford New Town and later took the name of Callowland, but in 1916 the area was renamed North Watford. Today, North Watford is mostly residential and is mainly characterised by red brick terraced houses of the late 19th century.

Among the industries setting up in the area was Wells Watford Brewery Ltd. (Note: Not to be confused with Charles Wells Ltd, a brewery in Bedford) Founded in 1890 by Lincolnshire farmer Ralph Thorpe, the brewery built up a large operation on St Albans Road with its premises linked to the St Albans branch line via a short railway line for transporting beer into London. The company was taken over in 1951 by another Watford brewery, Benskins Brewery and eventually wound up in 1955. Thorpe was a prominent local figure who was one of the founders of Watford Football Club and served as mayor of the town 1923–25.

A large chocolate factory of Dr. Tibbles' Vi-Cocoa Company opened in North Watford in 1899. The company produced a range of cocoa products, including Dr. Tibbles' Vi-Cocoa, Dr. Tibbles' Coca tablets, Dr. Tibbles' Brain Feeder and Dr. Tibbles' Child's Restorer. The company's advertising claimed that these products offered numerous health benefits and revitalising effects; as well as extracts of cocoa and kola, some also reputedly contained an amount of cocaine in their ingredients. In February 1903, a fire broke out at Dr. Tibbles' factory, consuming the building in the largest fire that had ever occurred in Watford. The factory was closed and rebuilt. Trading as The Watford Manufacturing Company, the company produced supplies for frontline troops in World War I, but after expanding the premises after the war, the company went bankrupt in 1922.

In 1951, the British furniture manufacturer Hille moved from its premises in Hainault to the former Wells Brewery building. The company, founded in 1906 in the East End of London by a Russian immigrant, Salamon Hille, specialised in modern design furniture, most notably the polypropylene stacking chair designed by Robin Day while he worked at Hille in Watford. The Polyprop went on to become the world's best-selling chair. The company's success grew and in 1961 it opened a new showroom and office building on the St Albans Road, Hille House.

== Landmarks ==
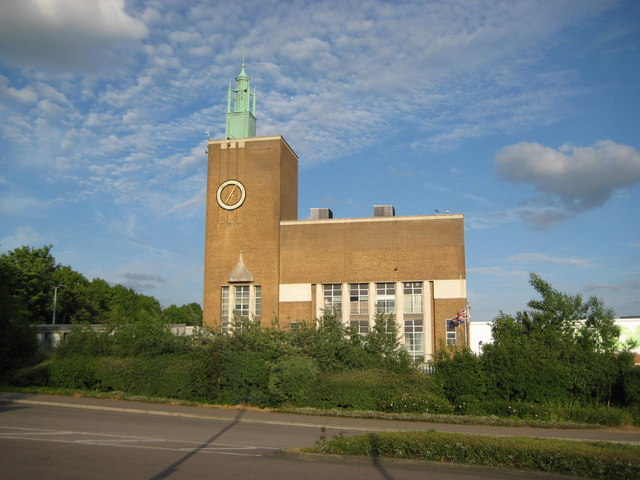
Odhams Printworks

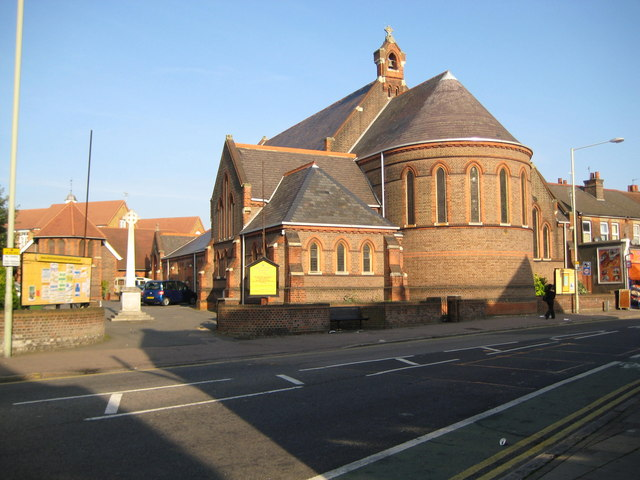
Christ Church, St Alban's Road

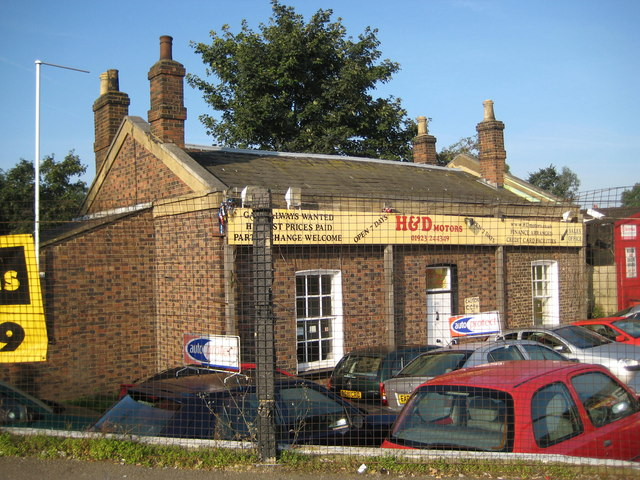
The original Watford railway station

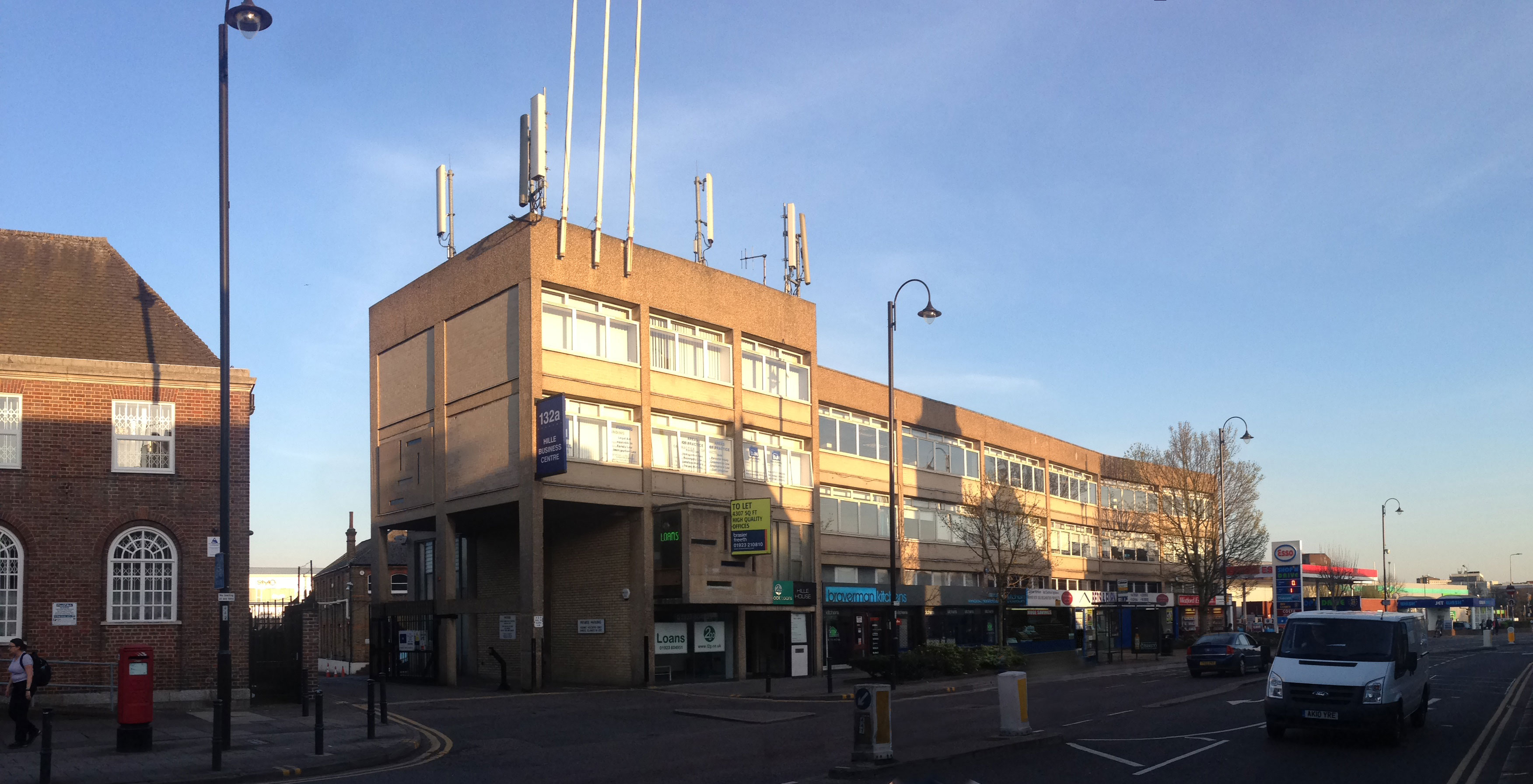
Ernő Goldfinger's Hille House on St Albans Road (1959)

The most prominent landmark building in North Watford is the former printworks of Odhams Press, a large brick and concrete structure which was built in 1954 to the designs of Yates, Cook & Darbyshire architects and modelled on the design of Stockholm City Hall. This building was an extension to an older printworks which had been built in 1937 by Sir Owen Williams. This locally listed building stands on the A41 North Western Avenue with its prominent clock tower overlooking the Dome Roundabout and it is still in use today as a print works. Its prominent clock tower houses a tank for holding water used during the printing process.

Another locally listed building in North Watford is Christ Church, an Anglican church on St Albans Road. This distinctive red brick structure was designed in a semi-Italian Romanesque style by the architects John Hudson and John Hunt and is noted for its semicircular brick apse. The foundation stone for the Church was laid in 1904 by Princess Christian of Schleswig-Holstein, fifth child of Queen Victoria and Prince Albert.

Opposite this church, at 124-132 St Albans Road, stands Hille House, the former offices of the furniture design firm Hille. This 1959 concrete office block has been locally listed as it is the work of the noted architect Ernő Goldfinger and an example of Brutalist architecture. The front of the building features a cantilevered concrete box glazed with brightly coloured glass, a signature of Goldfinger's design and the first of his buildings to have this feature. Behind this stands the former Wells Brewery (1890–1901). This was the premises of Wells Watford Brewery Ltd, a local beer brewing company. The brewery was taken over by Benskins Brewery in 1951 and closed in 1955.

North Watford's connection with railway history can be seen in the Grade-II-listed Old Station House at 147A St Albans Road. This small, single-storey red-brick building was built 1836–7 as the original Watford Station when the first section of the London-Birmingham railway was opened, a rare surviving example of architecture from the beginning of the railway age. In the short period when the Dowager Queen Adelaide was resident at Cassiobury House (c. 1846–49), this station was remodelled to provide her with a royal waiting room. It was also reportedly used by Queen Victoria and Prince Albert on a trip to visit Sir Robert Peel in November 1843, when they travelled by road from Windsor Castle to take a train from Watford to Tamworth. It closed in 1858 when it was replaced by the new station at Watford Junction and today the building is occupied by a second-hand car dealership.

The railway tunnel built under North Watford in 1837 is also a significant example of railway architecture, and the neoclassical stone entrance to the original western tunnel of the London & Birmingham Railway has been awarded Grade II listing

== Transport ==
=== Railway stations ===
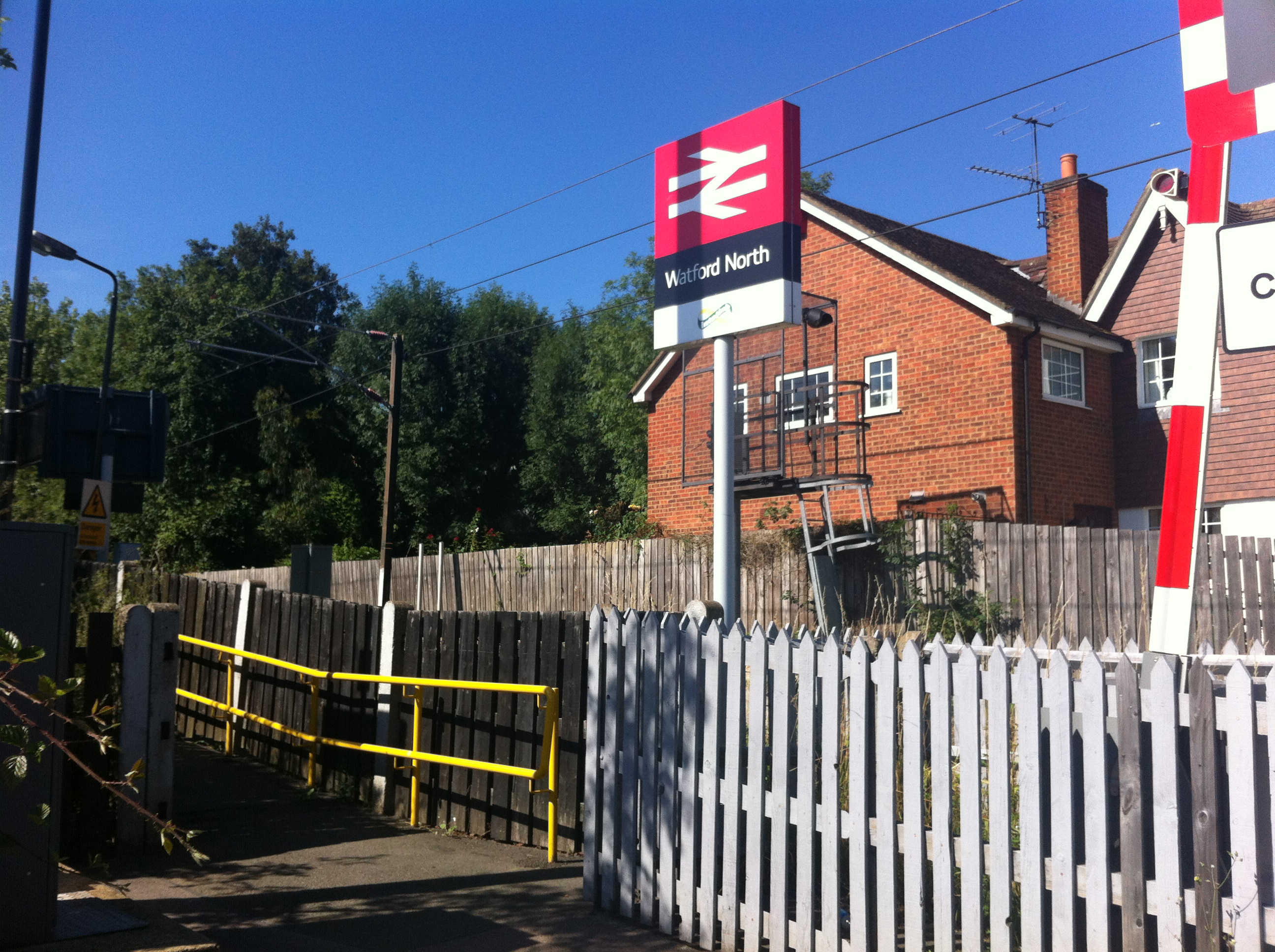
Watford North entrance

North Watford is served by Watford North railway station, a small halt on the suburban St Albans Branch Line between St Albans Abbey and Watford. The station was originally opened in 1910 as Callowland station, and was renamed Watford North in 1927. West Midlands Trains operates a local train service on this route today, operating as London Northwestern Railway.

The North Watford area is also served at its southern end by Watford Junction railway station, which provides local and InterCity rail links on the West Coast Main Line including a frequent service into London Euston. Mainline train services are operated by Avanti West Coast and West Midlands Trains. The station is also served by London Overground services on the Watford DC Line and Southern services on the cross-London route to Clapham Junction and East Croydon. London Underground Metropolitan line services were due to commence operation out of Watford Junction as part of the Croxley Rail Link in 2018/9, But said project has been canceled due to lack of funding. In 2014, it was proposed that the Crossrail project could build a future line via Watford Junction.

=== Bus routes ===
The main bus routes which serve Watford and the surrounding area all pass down St Albans Road to get to the town centre from Garston bus garage. This means the area has very good bus links, including those from other towns such as St Albans by the 724, 321, 621, 622 and 320. There are also local bus routes 1, 8, 10 and bus W19 which serves the local housing estate. There is also the R8, 319 and R16 buses which serve Asda and Sainsbury's superstore. All this will change in 2018 when Garston bus garage closes down to make way for development.

=== Road ===
Watford's links to the motorway network run through North Watford. The main thoroughfare through North Watford is the St Albans Road (A412) which runs northwards through the area from Watford town centre. At its northern end it joins the Dome Roundabout which links Watford to the A41 towards Hemel Hempstead, the North Orbital Road (A405) towards St Albans, and to the M1 and M25 motorways.

National Cycle Route 6 runs along the eastern boundary of North Watford, partly along the banks of the River Colne. This long-distance cycle path provides connections to Watford town centre, Rickmansworth, St Albans and beyond.

== Shops ==
St Albans Road and its environs house a wide variety of retail and leisure outlets. These include: newsagents, public houses, restaurants and a post office.
