= Frederick Scott (designer) =

British designer

- Frederick Scott
- Born: 14 July 1942; High Wycombe, UK
- Died: 31 January 2001 (aged 58); London
- Education: Royal College of Art
- Occupation: Furniture designer
- Known for: Elephant chair; Athena chair; Supporto chair
- Spouse: Anita Sattentau
- Children: one daughter, one stepson
- Website: www.supporto.co.uk

Frederick Scott (14 July 1942 – 31 January 2001) was a British designer who was best known for creating the Supporto chair.

Scott was born in High Wycombe, Buckinghamshire in 1942. Scott began his career as an apprentice at the G Plan factory, before going on to study furniture design at the Royal College of Art in 1963. In 1969 Scott was engaged as a designer for the modern furniture manufacturer Hille. The company was keen to develop its range by commissioning designers to work with new plastics, following its success with Robin Day's polypropylene chair. Scott's designs exploited the possibilities of moulding offered by polyurethane, and he rapidly made his mark with innovative and distinctive designs such as the Elephant chair and the Athena chair, and in 1974 Hille launched his folding chair.

Scott also worked on a new design for a wheelchair for disabled people, and this work inspired him to design an ergonomic aluminium office chair, the Supporto office chair, in 1976. Despite the commercial risk involved in its manufacture, Hille took a risk and brought the Supporto to market in 1979. It became an internationally successful product, and the chair was soon complemented by other seating and tables in the Supporto range. Supporto is still in production today, manufactured by Zoeftig Limited.

== Awards and recognition ==
- Design Award from the Design Council
- High back Supporto the best office chair according to The Independent.
