= Rosamind Julius =

English entrepreneur and furniture designer

- 1962 photo
- Born: 30 November 1923; London
- Died: 19 May 2010 (aged 86); Islington
- Employer: Hille Furniture
- Known for: Entrepreneurship in Furniture design
- Children: Corinne Julius

Rosamind Julius (30 November 1923 – 19 May 2010) was an English entrepreneur and furniture manufacturer. Together with her husband and her mother-in-law, they built up the Hille furniture company which used new British designers to create modernist furniture.

== Life ==
Rosamind Goldman was born in London in 1923. Her mother was born Rachel (or "Ray Hille") Hille. She was a leading figure in her Russian-Jewish family's furniture business. Hille furniture company was founded in 1906 by Salamon Hille in London. Her mother had married Morris Goldman and she had taken his name, but in 1932 they took over the Hille company and all of them changed their name to Hille. Goldman's early career was dictated by the second world war where she enlisted and worked for Louis Mountbatten. In 1944 she married Leslie Julius and in 1948 they had a daughter named Corinne Julius. Her husband had left the services as a Major and they both joined the company furniture business in 1945. They worked as a close team with credit being difficult to divide between them but her mother, Ray Hille, was also an important contributor to the company's success.

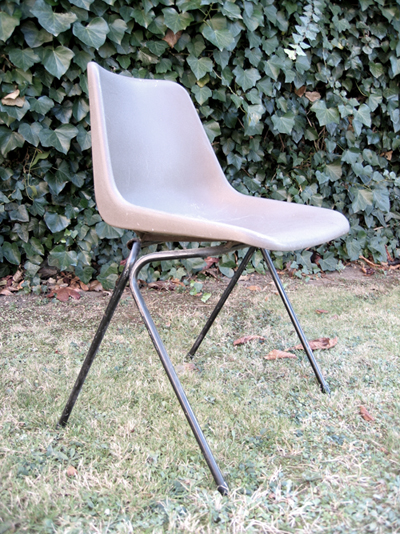
Hille polypropylene chair (1963), designed by Robin Day

The Hille furniture business was transformed when they met two award-winning British designers in America in 1949. Historically the business had created reproduction antiques and during the war it had repaired antique furniture for the Victoria and Albert Museum as it could not compete even after the war with the government's Utility furniture scheme. The business was temporarily saved at the end of the war by exporting Chippendale style furniture to America. The two designers, Robin Day and Clive Latimer, had won prizes for furniture design from the New York Museum of Modern Art. With Rosamind Julus and her husband as the entrepreneurs, the company changed direction and the new furniture was designed not for retail but for specification by architects and large projects. They were awarded the contract to deliver furniture for the Festival Hall. This was a prestigious commission and Day used a steel base for the tippable chair design. This design is still in the hall in 2014.

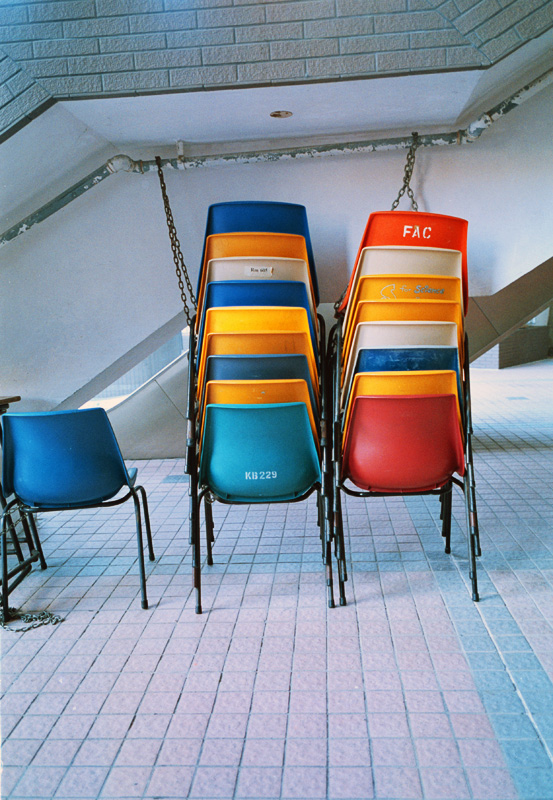
Collection of chairs

Robin Day designed a novel chair name Hillestak which used laminated wood and the stackable chairs became popular for public buildings. The partnership with Robin Day was very successful and in 1952 the Hille company set up showrooms in Mayfair where their modernist furniture could be displayed. Here they could host architects and interior designers. They won important contracts to supply prestige offices in London and the contract for the furniture for what would become Heathrow Airport. These chairs are still there (2014). By 1953 they had five showrooms in Britain and another in Grenoble. In 1958 they designed the furniture for Gatwick Airport. Rosalind and her husband's company continued to support British design and in 1963 Day designed another important chair this time in Polypropylene. This polypropylene chair would become the world's most commercially successful chair. Fred Scott designed the Supporto seating system in 1976 and it was launched in 1979. Meanwhile, they won contracts for British embassies, the Istanbul Hilton and the Unesco building in Paris. Their successful British designs were licensed overseas including the rights to manufacture tens of thousands of chairs for the Mexico Olympics.

The family stopped being involved in furniture in 1983 when they sold the business. Leslie Julius died in 1989, but Rosamind continued to lead. She was a fellow of the Royal College of Art and she and the designer Kenneth Grange led the organisation of an important conference in Aspen, Colorado in 1986 which helped to launch the work of the Spitting image designers Fluck and Law, the architect Norman Foster, the painter David Hockney and the fashion designer Bruce Oldfield.

She died a widow in 2010 in a hospital in Islington.
