= Hille (furniture) =

Furniture manufacturing company

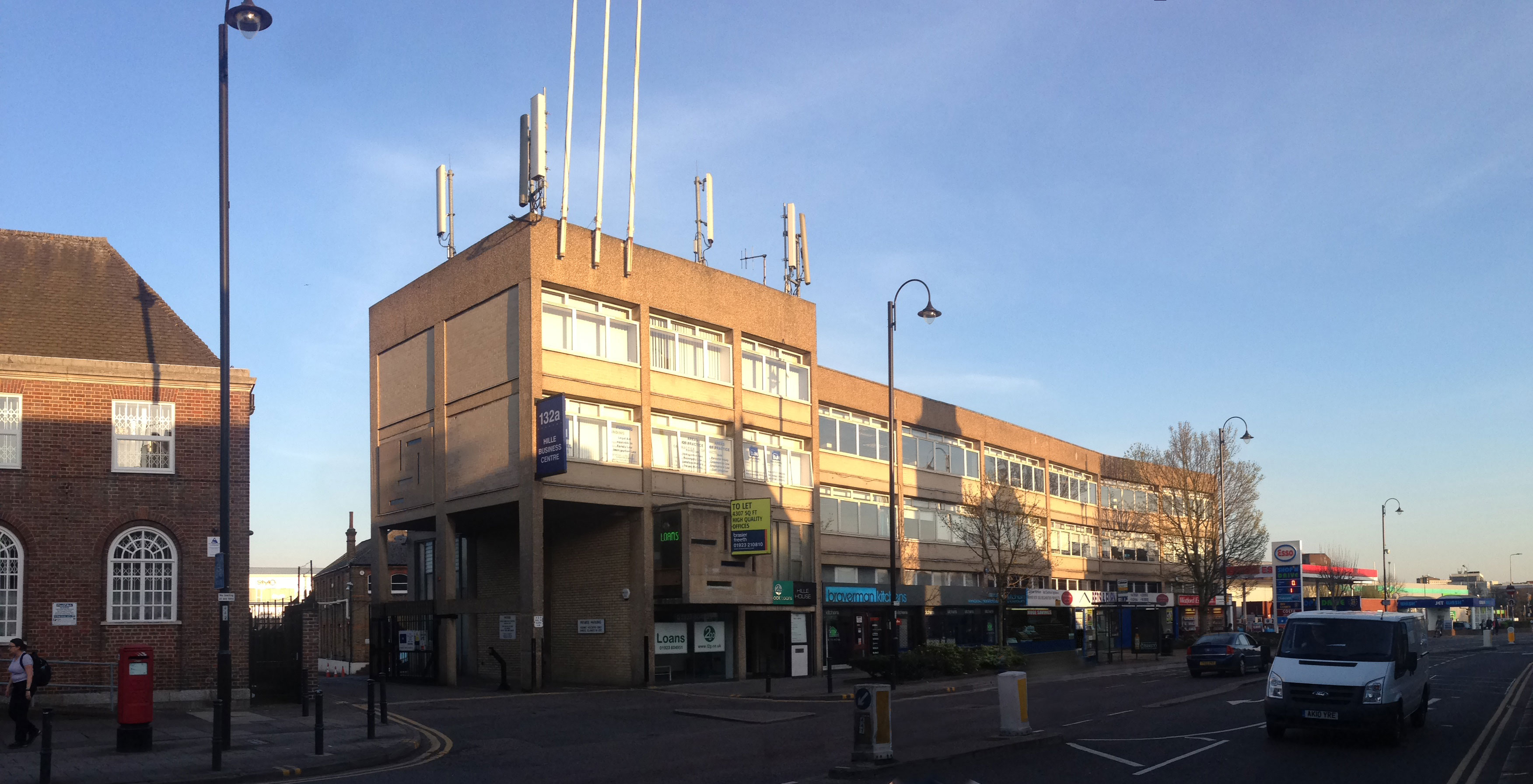
- Former Hille headquarters in North Watford
- Company type: Privately held company
- Industry: Furniture design & manufacturing
- Founded: 1906 in London, UK
- Founder: Salamon Hille
- Headquarters: Ebbw Vale, Wales
- Key people: Robin Day, Fred Scott, Richard Snell, David Rowe
- Products: Hillestack chair; Polyprop chair; Supporto seating system
- Website: hille.co.uk

Hille (/ˈhɪli/ HIL-ee} is a British modern furniture manufacturer which is especially noted for its range of Modernist chairs. Its products have been influential in the history of interior design and the company has been engaged internationally in a number of major design projects, including furnishings for the Royal Festival Hall and Gatwick Airport. A number of prominent furniture designers have worked for Hille, including Robin Day and Fred Scott.

== History ==
The company was founded in 1906 by Salamon Hille in London's East End.

The Hille furniture business was transformed when Salomon's granddaughter Rosamind Julius and her husband met two award-winning British designers in America in 1949. Historically the business had created reproduction antiques and during the war it had repaired antique furniture for the Victoria and Albert Museum. It could not compete in the new furniture market even after the war with the government's Utility furniture scheme. The business was temporarily saved at the end of the war by exporting Chippendale style furniture to America. The two designers, Robin Day and Clive Latimer, had won prizes for furniture design from the New York Museum of Modern Art. Together the company changed direction and the new furniture was designed not for retail but for specification by architects and large projects. They were awarded the contract to deliver furniture for the Festival Hall.

In 1951, Hille moved from its premises in Hainault to a former brewery building in Watford, Hertfordshire. As the company found success it began to expand, and in 1961 it opened a new showroom and office building at its North Watford premises, Hille House, a noted example of Brutalist architecture by the noted architect Ernő Goldfinger.

Robin Day designed a novel chair name Hillestack which used laminated wood and the stackable chairs became popular for public buildings. The partnership with Day was very successful and in 1952 the Hille company set up showrooms in Mayfair where their modernist furniture could be displayed. Here they could host architects and interior designers. They won important contracts to supply prestige offices in London and the contract for the furniture for, what would become, Heathrow Airport. By 1953 Hille had five showrooms in Britain and another in Grenoble.

In 1958 they designed the furniture for Gatwick Airport. The company continued to support British design and in 1963 Day designed another important chair for Hille, this time in polypropylene. The Polyprop sold in millions and became the world's best-selling chair. Today it is regarded as a modern design classic, and has been celebrated by Royal Mail with a commemorative postage stamp in the 2009 "British Design Classics" issue.

Fred Scott designed the Supporto seating system in 1979. Meanwhile, they won contracts for British embassies, the Istanbul Hilton and the Unesco building in Paris. Their successful British designs were licensed overseas including the rights to manufacture tens of thousands of chairs for the Mexico Olympics.

The family stopped being involved in furniture in 1983 when they sold the business. Leslie Julius died in 1989.

Today, Hille's core business is designing and manufacturing sports stadium seating, including seats for the Millennium Stadium in Cardiff, Swansea's Liberty Stadium, Murrayfield Stadium in Edinburgh and Twickenham Stadium in London. Hille also supplies seats for schools and hospitals and public seating for railway stations. In 2012, Hille relocated its operations from Burnley to Rassau in Ebbw Vale, Wales.

== Gallery ==
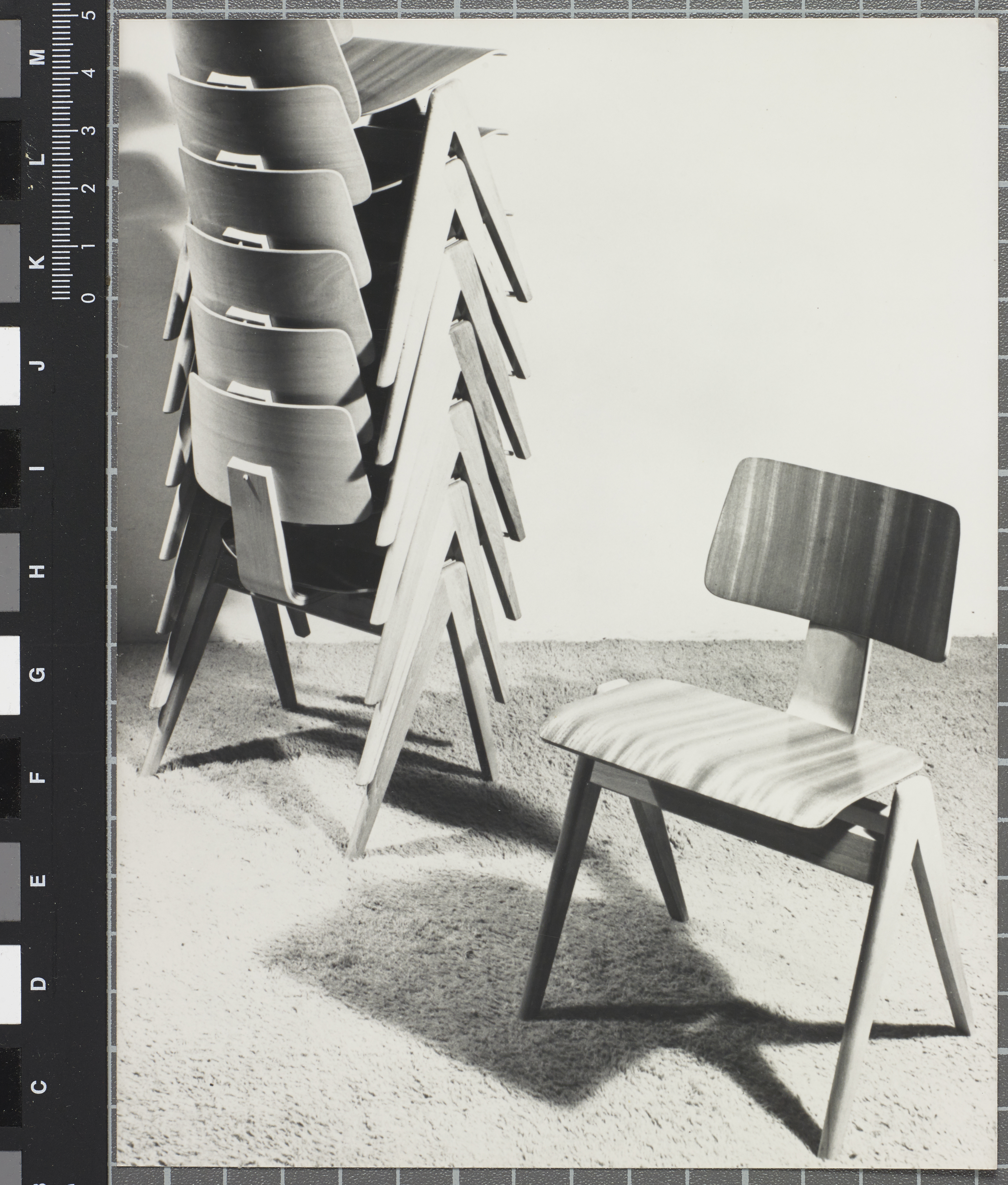
Hillestak chair (Robin Day, 1951) early version showing original leg joint

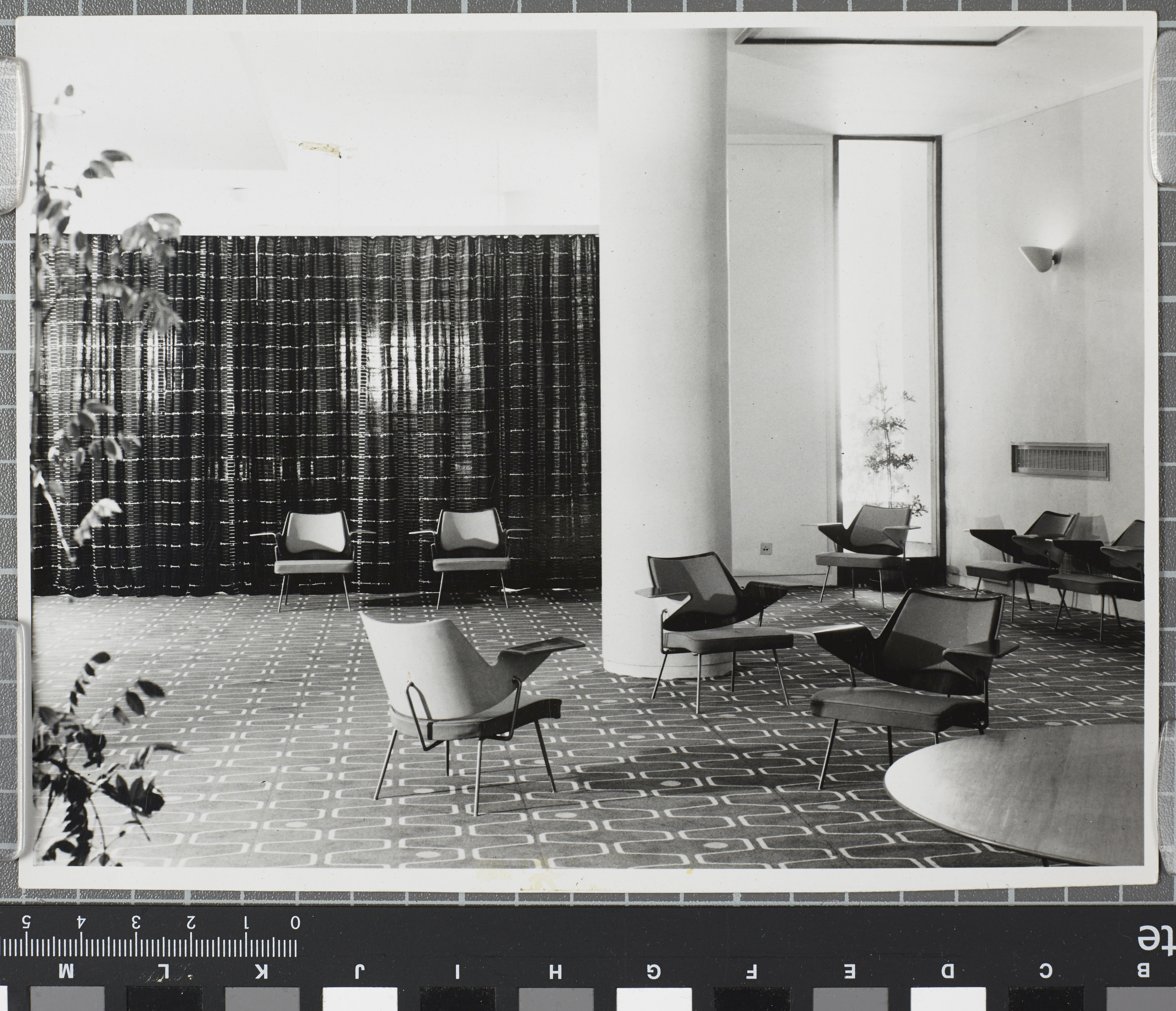
Royal Festival Hall lounge chairs (Robin Day, 1951)

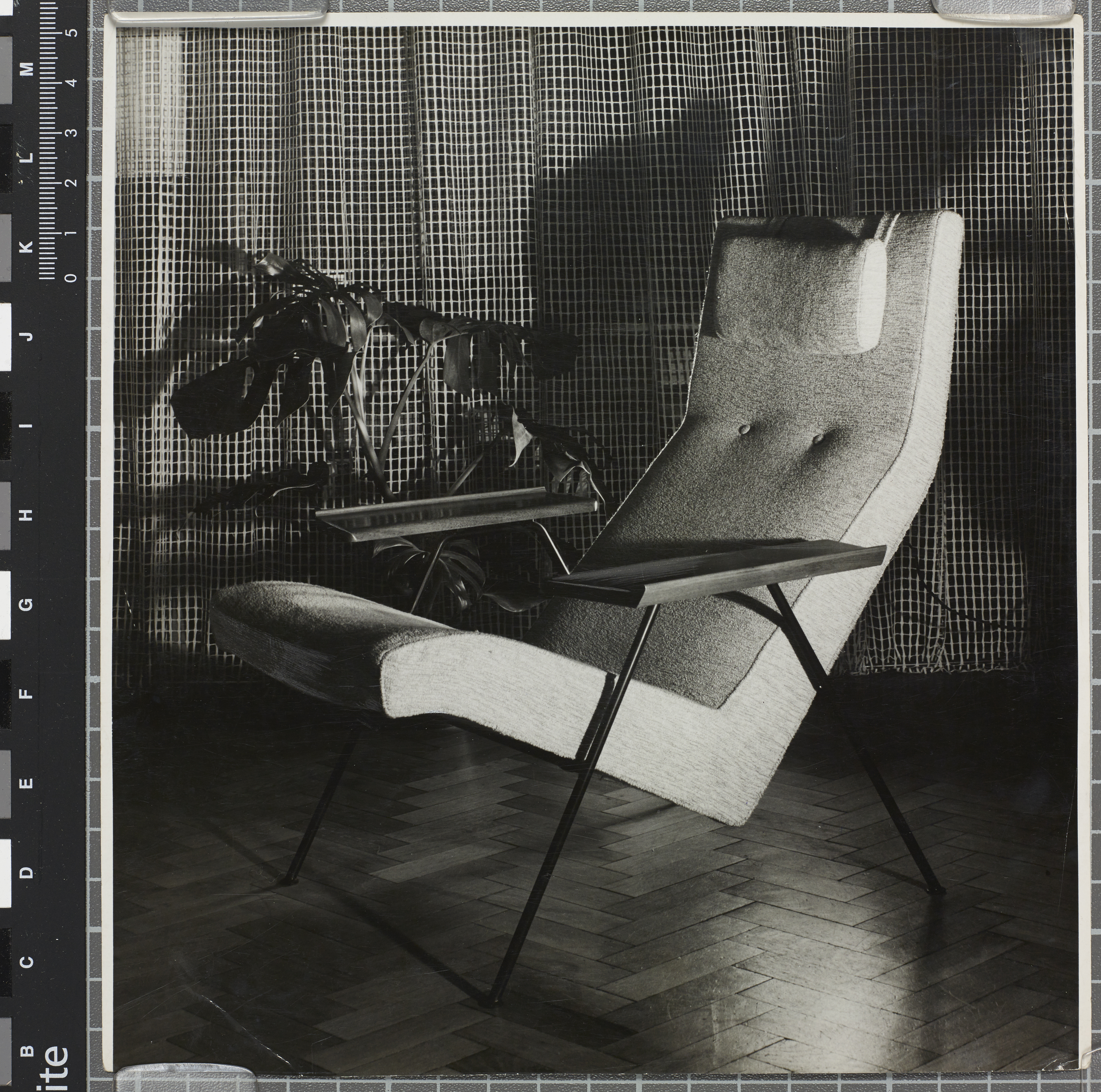
Reclining chair (Robin Day, 1952)

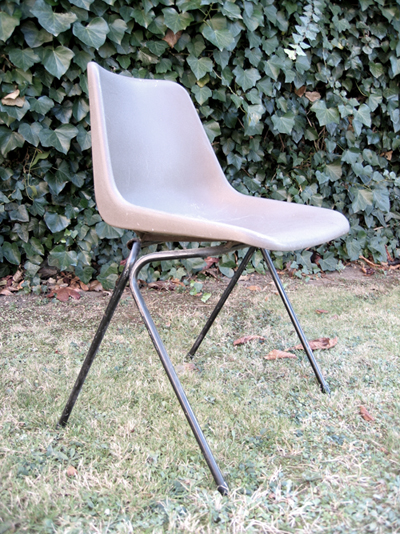
Hille polypropylene chair (Robin Day, 1963)

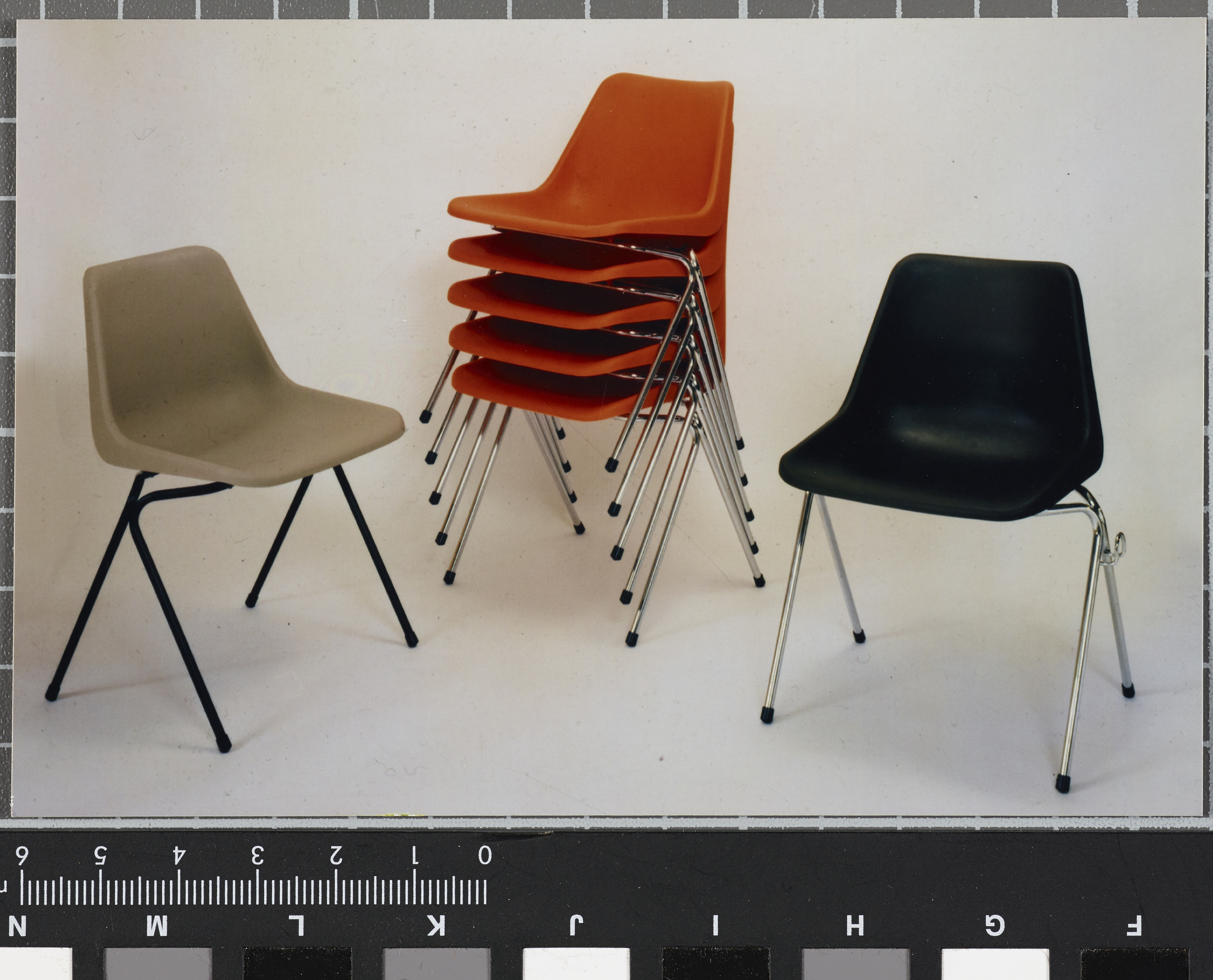
Polyprop stacking chairs in original colours (charcoal, light grey and flame red) (Robin Day, 1964)

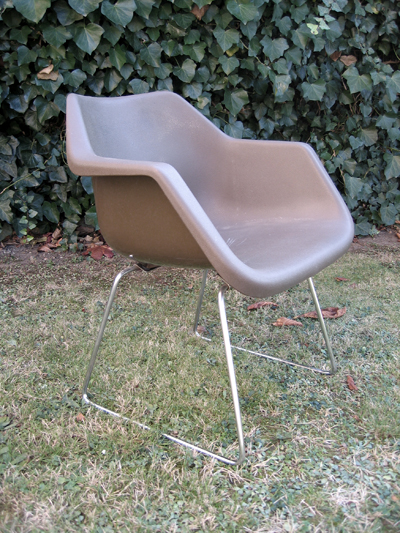
Hille polypropylene armchair with ski base (1967), designed by Robin Day

== See also ==
- Modern furniture
- Alessi
- American Furniture Warehouse
- Art Van
- BoConcept
- Duravit
- Habitat
- IKEA
- Kartell
- Ligne Roset
- Vitra
