= Lucienne Day =

British textile designer (1917–2010)

Lucienne Day OBE RDI FCSD
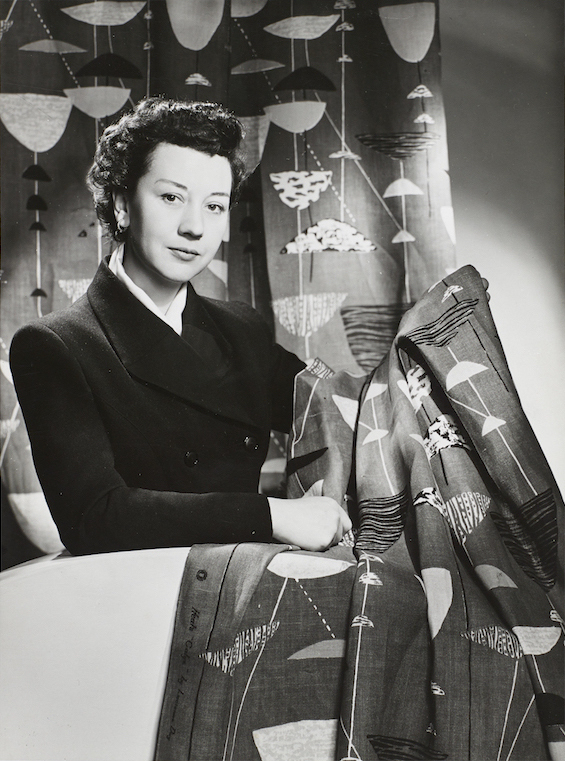
- Lucienne Day with Calyx, 1951
- Born: Désirée Lucienne Lisbeth Dulcie Conradi; 5 January 1917; Coulsdon, Surrey, England
- Died: 30 January 2010 (aged 93); Chichester, West Sussex, England
- Education: Royal College of Art
- Occupation: Textile designer
- Spouse: Robin Day
- Children: 1
- Website: Robin and Lucienne Day Foundation

Désirée Lucienne Lisbeth Dulcie Day OBE RDI FCSD (née Conradi; 5 January 1917 – 30 January 2010) was one of the most influential British textile designers of the 1950s and 1960s. Day drew on inspiration from other arts to develop a new style of abstract pattern-making in post-war British textiles, known as 'Contemporary' design. She was also active in other fields, such as wallpapers, ceramics and carpets.

== Childhood ==
Born in Coulsdon, Surrey, England, and raised in nearby Croydon, Lucienne Day was half-Belgian, the daughter of an English mother (Dulcie Conradi) and a Belgian father (Felix Conradi), who worked as a re-insurance broker. Initially educated at home, she attended Woodford School in Croydon from 1926–29 and a boarding school at the Convent of Notre Dame de Sion in Worthing, Sussex, from 1929 to 1934.

At the age of 17 Lucienne enrolled at Croydon School of Art, where she developed her interest in printed textiles. She went on to specialise in this field at the Royal College of Art, where she studied from 1937 to 1940. During her second year she was sent on a two-month placement to the firm Sanderson, where she worked in the company's large wallpaper studio. However, as Lesley Jackson notes: "The reality of working in a factory was an eye-opener for Day, who, with her growing taste for modern design, found it hard to adapt to the conservative style of the company."

== Marriage and early career ==
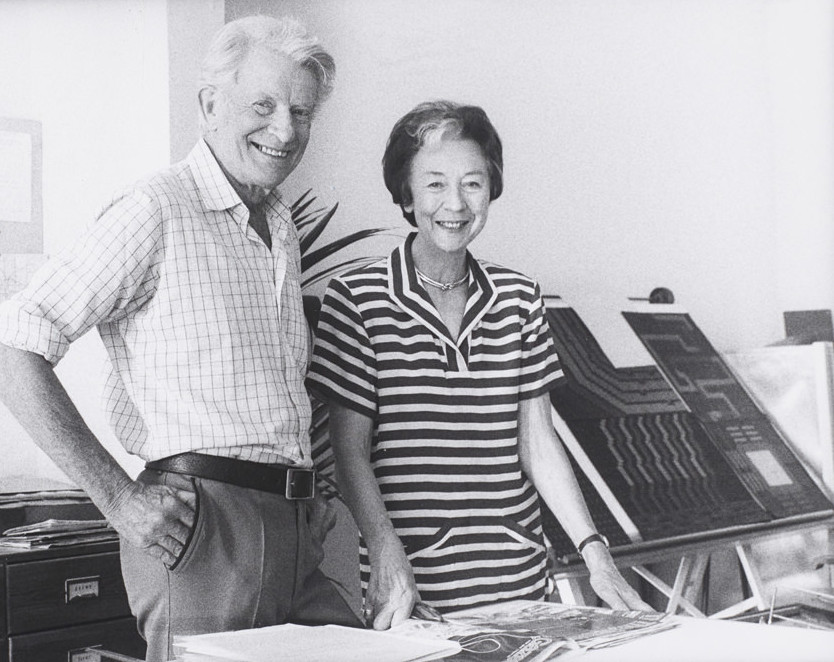
Robin and Lucienne Day in their Cheyne Walk Studio with Enigma silk mosaic (1987)

In March 1940, during her final year at the RCA, Lucienne met her future husband, furniture designer Robin Day, who shared her enthusiasm for modern design. Following their marriage on 5 September 1942, the couple set up home at 33 Markham Square in Chelsea, London, furnishing their flat with Lucienne's hand-printed textiles and Robin's hand-made furniture.

Due to wartime constraints on textile manufacturing, Lucienne was unable to pursue her career as a designer for several years. In the interim she taught at Beckenham School of Art, but as soon as the war was over she began practising as a freelance textile designer. Initially the main openings were in the field of dress fabrics, where her clients included Stevenson & Sons, Argand, Pasman Fabrics, Silkella, Horrockses and Cavendish Textiles.

In the longer term Lucienne's aim was to design furnishing fabrics, so she crossed over into this area at the earliest opportunity. Her first significant client was the Edinburgh Weavers, who produced two screen-printed furnishing fabrics in 1949. Shortly afterwards, she was commissioned to design a stylised floral by Heal's Wholesale and Export (later known as Heal Fabrics), the textile-producing subsidiary of the London department store Heal & Son. This fabric, Fluellin (1950), marked the start of her long relationship with Heal's, which lasted until 1974.

In 1952, Day and her husband moved into a Victorian-era house in London at 49 Cheyne Walk in Chelsea. Day transformed the interiors into a model of 'Contemporary' design and the house was featured in several magazines. The ground floor served as the Days' joint studio for almost five decades.

Beginning in 1962, around the same time she began working as a design consultant for John Lewis Partnership, Lucienne Day was made a faculty member at the Royal Designers for Industry. Between 1987–1989 Day became the first woman Master of Faculty. Five years after teaching Day began focusing on her works with printed fabrics and wallpaper designs.

== Festival of Britain and Calyx ==
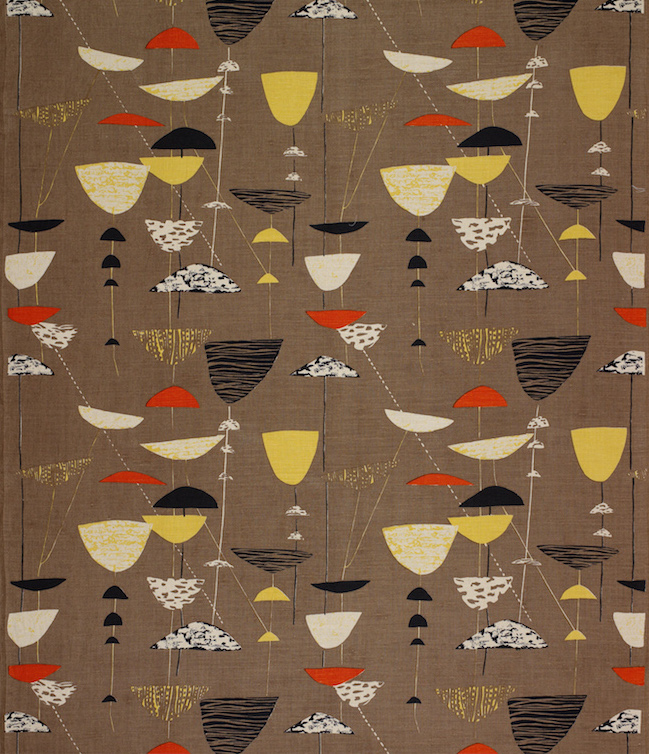
Calyx screen-printed furnishing fabric, Lucienne Day, Heal's Wholesale & Export, 1951

The Festival of Britain, a landmark exhibition held on London's South Bank in 1951, proved a decisive turning point in Lucienne Day's career. Seizing the opportunity to showcase her talents, she created several textiles and wallpapers which were displayed in various room settings in the Homes and Gardens Pavilion. Her most famous design, Calyx, was created as a furnishing fabric for an interior designed by her husband Robin Day. Hand screen printed on linen in lemon yellow, orangey-red and black on an olive-coloured ground, Calyx was a large-scale abstract pattern composed of cup-shaped motifs connected by spindly lines, which conjured up the aesthetic of modern painters and sculptors, such as Alexander Calder and Paul Klee.

Although Heal's were initially sceptical about Calyx, it proved a success, selling in large quantities over many years. Also exhibited at the Milan Triennale in 1951, where it won a Gold Medal, this design generated a new school of pattern-making which became known as the 'Contemporary' style. Calyx was widely emulated by other designers both at home and abroad.

Lucienne also designed three wallpapers for the Festival of Britain: Provence, block printed by John Line & Son, and Stella and Diabolo, screen printed by Cole & Son.

== Textile designs of the 1950s and 1960s ==
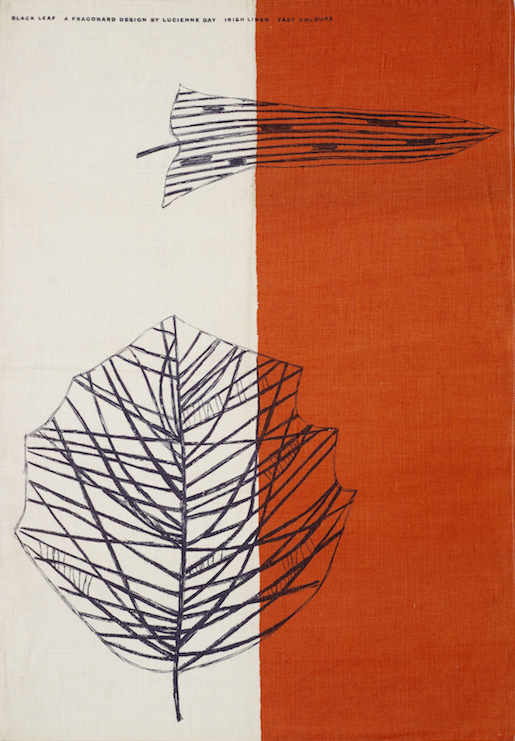
Black Leaf tea towel, Lucienne Day, Thomas Somerset & Co, 1959

Following the success of Calyx, Lucienne Day was commissioned by Tom Worthington, Heal Fabrics' managing director, to design up to six new furnishing fabrics each year. Over the course of their 25-year partnership, Lucienne created more than seventy designs for Heal's. Although she designed for other firms as well during this period, her textiles for Heal's form the core of her creative opus and include a string of patterns which typify the forward-looking post-war era, such as Dandelion Clocks (1953), Spectators (1953), Graphica (1953), Ticker Tape (1953), Trio (1954), Herb Antony (1956) and Script (1956).

At this date Lucienne's textiles were characterised by energetic rhythms and a spidery, doodle-like graphic style. Although apparently spontaneous, however, her designs displayed considerable technical skill, particularly their colourways and repeats. She began working with abstract designs in textiles and helped popularize this textile style in England. As well as pure abstracts, she often created stylised organic patterns incorporating motifs such as skeletal leaves, spindly stems, feathery seed heads and butterflies.

Later in the decade, responding to new artistic trends such as abstract expressionism and the architectural fashion for floor-to-ceiling picture windows, Lucienne's designs for Heal's became more overtly painterly and much larger in scale. Dramatic full-width patterns, such as Sequoia (1959) and Larch (1961), both featuring trees, and rugged textural abstracts such as Ducatoon (1959) and Cadenza (1961), reflect a significant evolution in style.

During the 1960s Lucienne adopted brighter colours and simpler forms of expression. As well as crisp flat florals, such as High Noon (1965), Pennycress (1966) and Poinsettia (1966), redolent of Flower Power, she developed a series of striking geometrics, including Apex (1967), Causeway (1968) and Sunrise (1969), which evoke parallels with Op Art.

Although Heal Fabrics were her principal client, Lucienne also designed textiles for Liberty's and British Celanese, whose acetate rayon fabrics were marketed by Sanderson during the mid 1950s. She also renewed her earlier associations with Edinburgh Weavers and Cavendish Textiles. Her dress fabrics for the latter were sold through the John Lewis Partnership.

Another important client during this period was the firm of Thomas Somerset, for whom Lucienne designed tea towels and table linen. Whereas her tablecloths and napkins were minimalist, her tea towels were playful, particularly designs such as Jack Sprat and Too Many Cooks (1959).

== Wallpapers, ceramics and carpets ==
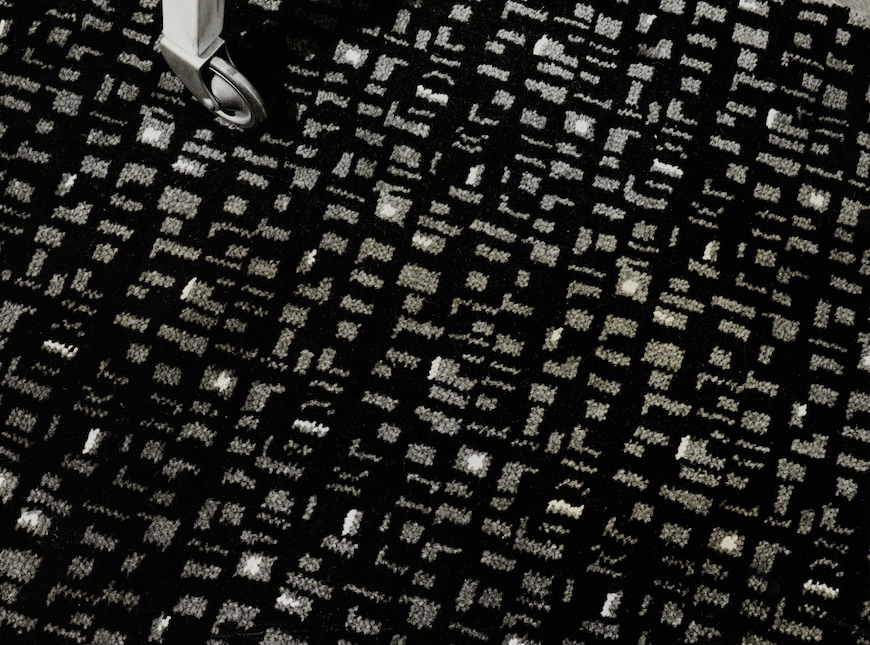
Tesserae carpet, Lucienne Day, Tomkinsons, 1957

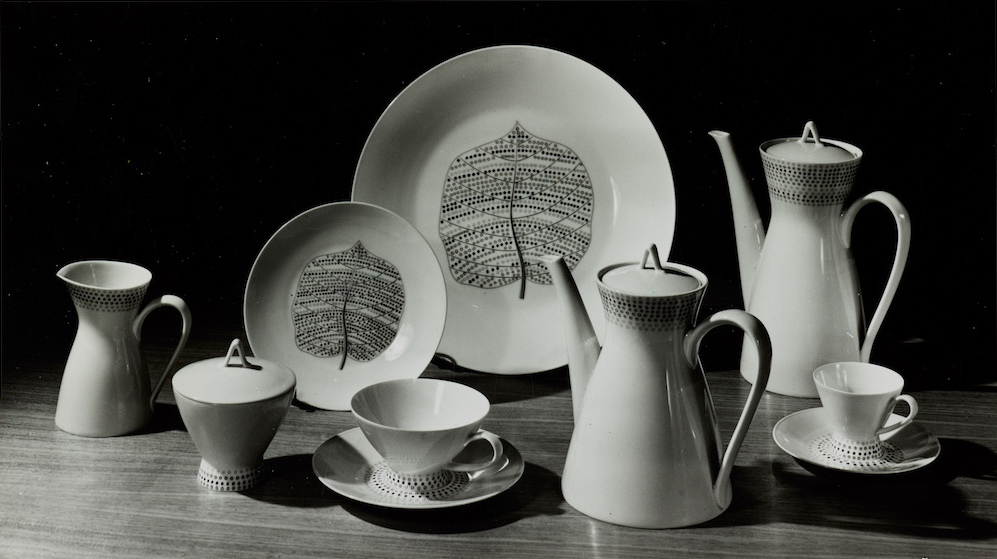
Bond Street porcelain plates, pattern designed by Lucienne Day, Rosenthal, 1957

After venturing into the field of wallpapers at the Festival of Britain, Lucienne Day continued to design wallpapers for the rest of the decade. Keen to reach a wider market, she teamed up with the progressive Lightbown Aspinall branch of the Wall Paper Manufacturers Ltd, whose products were collectively marketed under the tradename Crown. Although targeted specifically at architects, Lucienne's small-scale abstracts were available to the general public for domestic use. Being machine-printed rather than hand-printed meant that they were much more affordable than her previous wallpapers for John Line and Cole and Son.

Lucienne's partnership with the German company Rasch, who promoted her wallpapers as part of their international artists' range, gave her access to a European audience. Printed in just one or two colours with a deliberately restricted palette, her wallpaper designs were quieter and more recessive than her textiles, with smaller motifs and simpler compositions.

Carpets were another field in which Lucienne was extremely active during the 1950s and 1960s, collaborating with three leading British firms: Wilton Royal, Tomkinsons and I. & C. Steele. Her first carpet design – a mosaic-like pattern called Tesserae, produced by Tomkinsons – won a Design Centre Award in 1957. As colour consultant to Wilton Royal, Lucienne selected the colourways for their Architects Range and in 1964 produced her own collection of bold geometric designs. Her 1960s carpets for Steele's Studio 3 collection were also intended for contract use.

Today it is common practice for designers to work internationally, but during the post-war period this was quite rare. One of Lucienne's European clients was the German ceramics company Rosenthal. She designed a series of tableware patterns for Rosenthal from 1957 onwards and later joined the panel of international artists who oversaw Rosenthal's Studio Line.

== Design collaborations and consultancy work ==
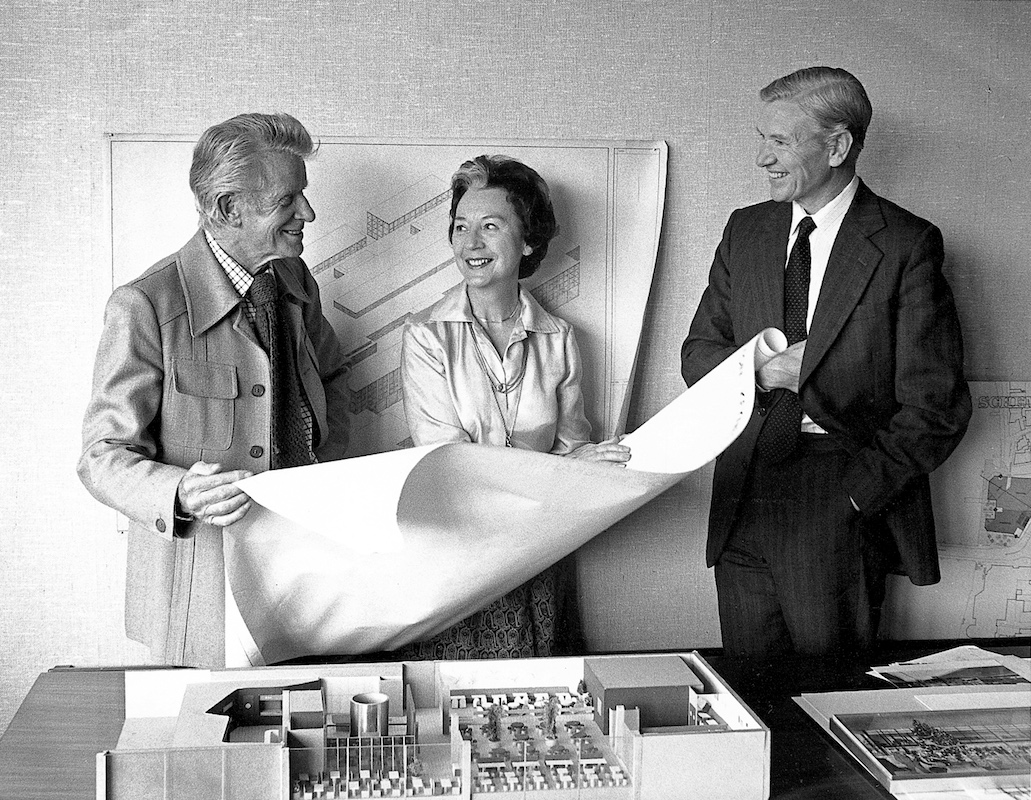
Robin and Lucienne Day with Harry Legg from John Lewis Partnership, 1979

Day and her husband shared a studio, but undertook few formal collaborations, apart from their consultancy work for BOAC and the John Lewis Partnership.

As joint design consultants to the British Overseas Airways Corporation from 1961 to 1967, the Days designed interiors for various aircraft, including the VC10 and the Super VC10. As well as selecting fabrics, carpets, paint colours and laminates, Lucienne designed patterns for the bulkheads and window surrounds.

As joint design consultants at the John Lewis Partnership from 1962 to 1987, the Days oversaw the introduction of a comprehensive new 'house style' affecting every aspect of the company's design, from interiors to stationery and packaging. After being rolled out across JLP's network of department stores, a similar scheme was developed for the expanding network of Waitrose supermarkets.

== Silk mosaics and later career ==
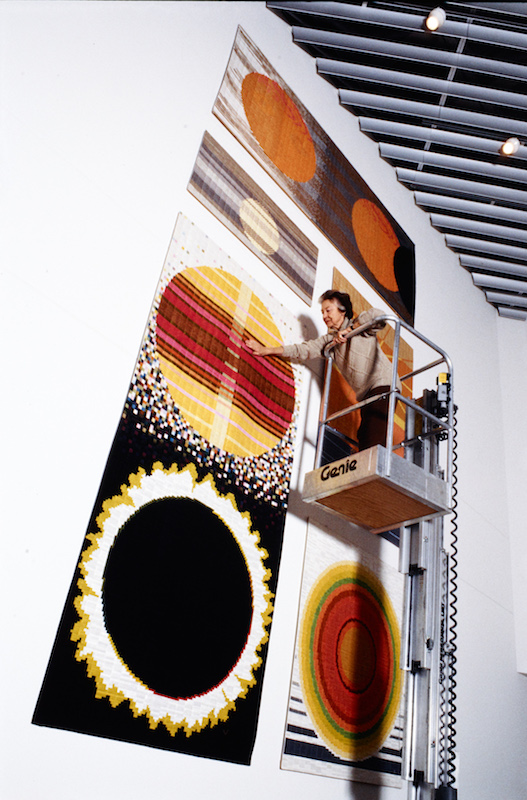
Aspects of the Sun silk mosaic, Lucienne Day, 1990

In 1975 Lucienne Day decided to withdraw from industrial design. Many of her long-established contacts had recently retired and she no longer felt in tune with prevailing styles. Seeking a new outlet for her creativity, she developed a new art form: one-off silk mosaic wall hangings. Designed using graph paper, they were constructed from small strips or squares of dyed silk, stitched together, hence the name silk mosaics. Vibrantly coloured, these hangings – some abstract, others with stylised motifs such as signs of the zodiac – were exhibited during the 1980s and 1990s at venues such as the National Theatre in London and the Röhsska Museum in Gothenburg.

Although the silk mosaic format was more restrictive than her earlier textile patterns, Lucienne relished the challenge of working within this self-imposed discipline, experimenting freely with the interplay of colour. Through commissions for specific interiors, such as Aspects of the Sun, a large composite hanging created in 1990 for the new John Lewis store at Kingston, she was able to engage with architecture more directly and ambitiously than ever before. Originally created for the café, Aspects of the Sun was re-hung in another part of the building in September 2016.

After moving to 21 West Street, Chichester, Sussex, in 2000, Lucienne Day officially retired. Plants had long been the inspiration for many of her designs. In later life she actively pursued her interest in botany and her love of gardening. She died on 30 January 2010 at the age of 93.

== Awards ==
Throughout her career, Lucienne Day won many awards, including a Gold Medal for Calyx at the Milan Triennale in 1951 and a Citation of Merit from the American Institute of Decorators in 1952. In 1954, four of her Heal's fabrics (Ticker Tape, Linear, Spectators and Graphica) won a Gran Premio at the Milan Triennale.

In 1957 she won a Design Centre Award from the Council of Industrial Design for her Tesserae carpet for Tomkinsons, the first of three awards. Her second was for three tea towels for Thomas Somerset – Black Leaf, Bouquet Garni and Too Many Cooks – in 1960. Her third came in 1968 for her Chrevron furnishing fabric for Heal Fabrics.

In 1962, Lucienne Day was made a Royal Designer for Industry (RDI), an appointment which, according to the Royal Society of Arts, honours designers who have achieved "sustained excellence in aesthetic and efficient design for industry." At that date she was only the fifth woman to be made an RDI, and she later served as the first female Master of the Faculty of Royal Designers for Industry from 1987–9. In 2004, she was awarded an OBE.

== Style and influences ==
Lucienne Day's early textiles were inspired by her love of modern art, especially the abstract paintings of Paul Klee and Joan Miró. Reflecting on recent trends in textiles in 1957, Lucienne observed: "In the very few years since the end of the war, a new style of furnishing fabrics has emerged.... I suppose the most noticeable thing about it has been the reduction in popularity of patterns based on floral motifs and the replacement of these by non-representational patterns – generally executed in clear bright colours, and inspired by the modern abstract school of painting."

However, although abstraction was the dominant idiom in her work, Lucienne also perpetuated the English tradition of patterns based on plant forms, often incorporating stylised motifs derived from nature, such as leaves, flowers, twigs and seedpods. After dabbling in painterly, textural abstraction during the early 1960s, she experimented with hard-edged, multi-layered geometric designs composed of squares, circles, diamonds and stripes during the mid to late 1960s. Stylised florals and arboreal designs remained recurrent motifs until the mid 1970s.

Lucienne Day believed that good design should be affordable and in 2003, she told The Scotsman newspaper that she had been "very interested in modern painting although I didn't want to be a painter. I put my inspiration from painting into my textiles, partly because I suppose I was very practical. I still am. I wanted the work I was doing to be seen by people and to be used by people. They had been starved of interesting things for their homes in the war years, either textiles or furniture."

== Legacy ==
Lucienne Day enjoyed a long career spanning six decades. Her post-war textiles are particularly well-known. As Lesley Jackson noted in 2010: "Her playful patterns capture the ebullience and optimism of the early 1950s, when all the pent up creative energy of the war years was unleashed in a flood of joyous creativity... Attuned to the needs of both architects and homemakers, and skilled at creating patterns for different media, Lucienne was pre-eminent in many fields of interior design."

Lucienne Day's post-war achievements were first brought to attention in a major international exhibition called The New Look: Design in the Fifties at Manchester City Art Gallery in 1991. A wide-ranging solo exhibition was held at the Whitworth Art Gallery in Manchester in 1993, curated by Dr Jennifer Harris, author of the accompanying monograph Lucienne Day: A Career in Design. In 2001 Lucienne and Robin Day's work was featured in a joint retrospective at the Barbican Art Gallery, London, the largest gathering of their work to date. This exhibition was accompanied by a book by design historian and curator Lesley Jackson called Robin and Lucienne Day – Pioneers of Contemporary Design (Mitchell Beazley, 2001), which documented the couple's careers in detail and traced the evolution of their styles.

A posthumous exhibition featuring the Days' work called Robin and Lucienne Day: Design and the Modern Interior, was held in Spring 2011 at Pallant House Gallery in Chichester. Lucienne Day's work is held in many public collections, but the two principal repositories are The Whitworth Art Gallery, University of Manchester, and the Victoria and Albert Museum, London, where selected archive material is also held in the Archive of Art and Design.

The Robin and Lucienne Day Foundation, established by the designers' daughter Paula Day in 2012, provides educational information about the Days through events and publications, including a website. The Foundation celebrated Lucienne Day's centenary year in 2017 by co-ordinating a nationwide programme of events highlighting different aspects of her career. The two main exhibitions were Lucienne Day: A Sense of Growth curated by Jennifer Harris at The Whitworth Art Gallery, which focused on her plant-inspired textiles, and the Arts University Bournemouth exhibition Lucienne Day: Living Design, which celebrated Lucienne Day's design legacy in a display of archive photographs and current reissues of her work. The Victoria and Albert Museum launched a Lucienne Day Online Collection.

The Foundation now regulates reissues of the Days' designs. Current licensees of Lucienne Day's designs include Classic Textiles (furnishing fabrics originally produced by Heal Fabrics), twentytwentyone (tea towels originally produced by Thomas Somerset), Bookroom Art Press (prints originally produced as tea towels), and Mini Moderns (wallpapers).
