= Modern furniture =

Furniture designed from the 19th century to the present day

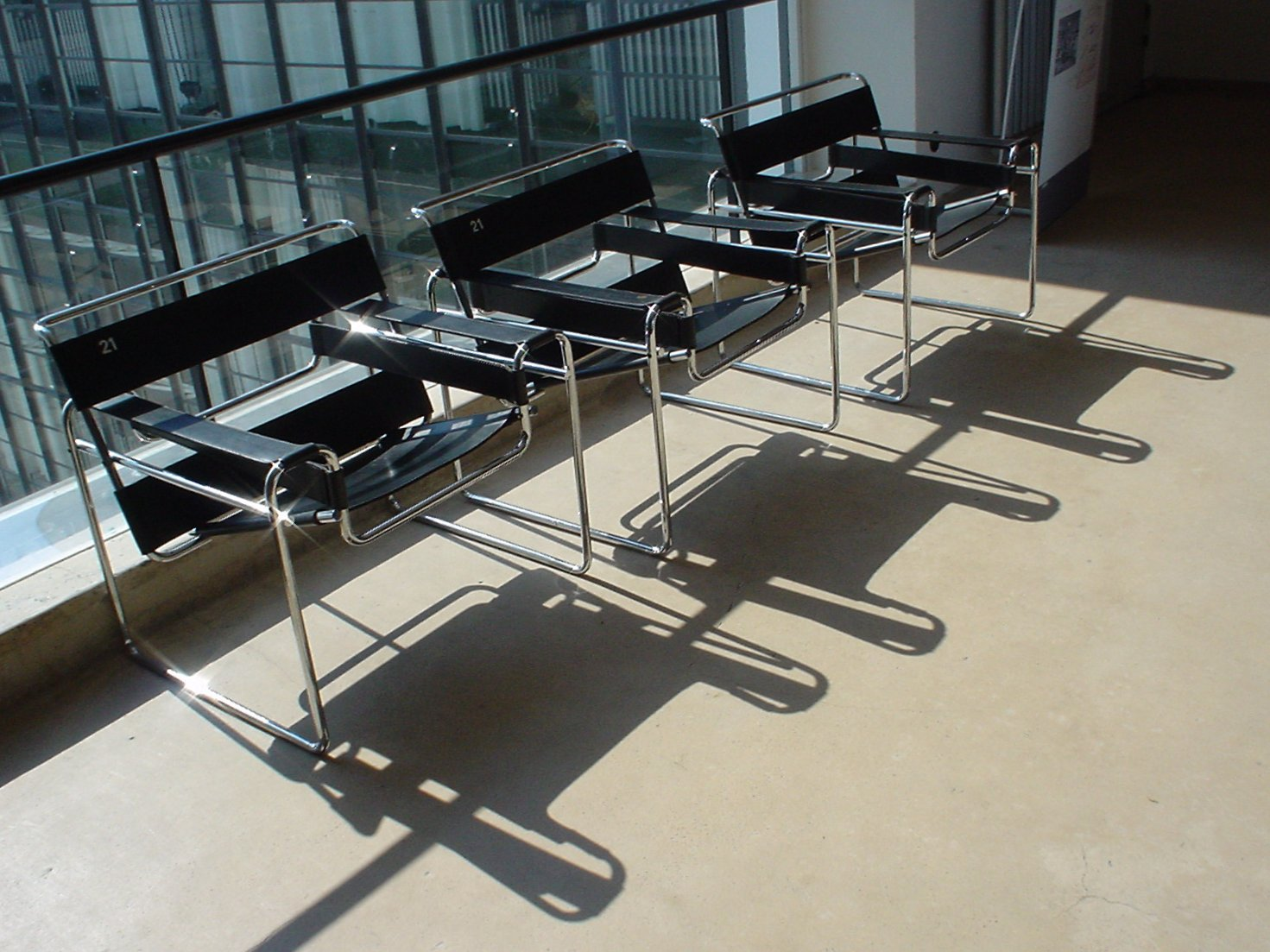
Three versions of Marcel Breuer's "Wassily Chair"

Modern furniture refers to furniture produced from the late 19th century through the present that is influenced by modernism. Post-World War II ideals of cutting excess, commodification, and practicality of materials in design heavily influenced the aesthetic of the furniture. It was a tremendous departure from all furniture design that had gone before it. There was an opposition to the decorative arts, which included Art Nouveau, Neoclassical, and Victorian styles.

Dark or gilded carved wood and richly patterned fabrics gave way to the glittering simplicity and geometry of polished metal. The forms of furniture evolved from visually heavy to visually light. This shift from decorative to minimalist principles of design can be attributed to the introduction of new technology, changes in philosophy, and the influences of the principles of architecture. As Philip Johnson, the founder of the Department of Architecture and Design at the Museum of Modern Art articulates:

"Today industrial design is functionally motivated and follows the same principles as modern architecture: machine-like simplicity, smoothness of surface, avoidance of ornament ... It is perhaps the most fundamental contrast between the two periods of design that in 1900 the Decorative Arts possessed ..."

With the machine aesthetic, modern furniture easily came to promote factory modules, which emphasized the time-managing, efficient ideals of the period. Modernist design was able to strip down decorative elements and focus on the design of the object in order to save time, money, material, and labour. The goal of modern design was to capture timeless beauty in spare precision.

== Philosophy ==
Prior to the modernist design movement, there was an emphasis on furniture as an ornament. The length of time a piece took to create was often a measure of its value and desirability. The origins of modernist design can be traced back to the Industrial Revolution and the birth of mechanized production. With new resources and advancements, a new philosophy emerged, one that shifted the emphasis of objects being created for decorative purposes to being designs that promote functionality, accessibility, and production.

The idea of accessible, mass-produced design that is affordable to anyone was not only applied to industrial mechanics, but also to the aesthetics of architecture and furniture. This philosophy of practicality came to be called Functionalism. It became a popular "catchword" and played a large role in theories of modern design. Functionalism rejected the imitation of stylistic and historical forms and sought an establishment of functionality in a piece. Functionalist designers would consider the interaction of the design with its user and how many of the features, such as shape, colour, and size, would conform to the human posture. Western design generally, whether architectural or design of furniture, had for millennia sought to convey an idea of lineage, a connection with tradition and history. However, the modern movement sought newness, originality, technical innovation, and ultimately the message that it conveyed spoke of the present and the future, rather than of what had gone before it.

== Influential groups ==
The modernist design seems to have evolved out of a combination of influences: technically innovative materials and new manufacturing methods. Following the Second Industrial Revolution, new philosophies and artists emerged from the De Stijl movement in the Netherlands, the Deutscher Werkbund and the Bauhaus school, both located in Germany.

=== De Stijl ===
The De Stijl (The Style) movement, was founded in 1917 by Theo Van Doesburg in Amsterdam. The movement was based on the principles of promoting abstraction and universality by reducing excessive elements down to the essentials of form and colour. Dutch design generally has shown a preference for simple materials and construction, but De Stijl artists, architects, and designers strove to combine these elements to create a new visual culture.

Characteristics of furniture from this movement include simplified geometry of vertical and horizontal compositions and pure primary colours and black and white. It was the rejection of the decorative excesses from Art Nouveau and promoted logicality through construction and function. Influential artists from this movement include Gerrit Rietveld, Piet Mondrian, and Mies van der Rohe, who continued to evolve the ideas of modernist design.

=== Deutscher Werkbund ===
Founded in 1907 in Munich, Germany, the Deutscher Werkbund was an organization of artists, designers, and manufacturers that pushed to create a cultural utopia achieved through a design and new ideas in the early twentieth century. They shared the Modern thought of "form follows function" as well as the "ethnically pure" design principles such as quality, material honestly, functionality, and sustainability. The DWB played a key role in advocating these to other German artists and designers, which inspired the development of many Modern design institutions. Among the most notable architects and designers from the DWB are: Hermann Muthesius, Peter Behrens, and Ludwig Mies van der Rohe.

=== The Bauhaus School ===
The Bauhaus school, founded in 1919 in Weimar, Germany, by architect Walter Gropius, was an art school that combined all aspects of art. It eventually was forced to move to Dessau, Germany, in 1925 due to political tensions, then Berlin, in 1932 until the doors of the school were closed from the pressure of the Nazi regime. With the change of location came a change of direction in the institution. The Bauhaus adopted an emphasis on production in Dessau, but maintained its intellectual concerns in design. Throughout the years, the goal of the institution was to combine intellectual, practical, commercial, and aesthetic concerns through art and technology. The Bauhaus promoted the unity of all areas of art and design: from typography to tableware, clothing, performance, furniture, art, and architecture. Prominent artists and designers from the Bauhaus include: Marcel Breuer, Marianne Brandt, Hannes Meyer (who was Gropius's successor, only to be replaced by Mies van der Rohe).

=== African and Asian culture ===
An aesthetic preference for the baroque and the complex was challenged not only by new materials and the courage and creativity of a few Europeans, but also by the growing access to African and Asian design. In particular the influence of Japanese design is legend: in the last years of the 19th century the Edo period in Japan, Japanese isolationist policy began to soften, and trade with the west began in earnest. The artifacts that emerged were striking in their simplicity, their use of solid planes of color without ornament, and contrasting use of pattern.

Japanese influence in art and culture– Japonism – swept Europe. The Western Art Nouveau movement is considered to have emerged from this influence. Designers such as Charles Rennie MacIntosh and Eileen Gray are notable in both their modern and Art Deco work, and they and others like Frank Lloyd Wright are notable for blending of the two styles.

== Materials ==
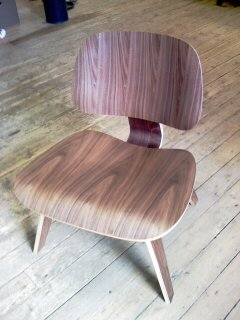
Eames Lounge Chair Wood (LCW)

The use of new materials, such as steel; glass, used by Walter Gropius; molded plywood, such as that used by Charles and Ray Eames; and plastics, were formative in the creation of these new designs. They represented a significant contrast to what came before. This interest in new materials and methods produced a blending of technology and art. This became a working philosophy among the members of the Deutscher Werkbund.

The Werkbund was a government-sponsored organization to promote German art and design around the world. Many of those involved with it including Mies van der Rohe, Lilly Reich and others, were later involved in the Bauhaus School, and so it is not surprising perhaps that the Bauhaus School took on the mantle of this philosophy. They evolved a particular interest in using these new materials in such a way that they might be mass-produced and therefore make good design more accessible to the masses.

== Iconic examples of modern furniture ==
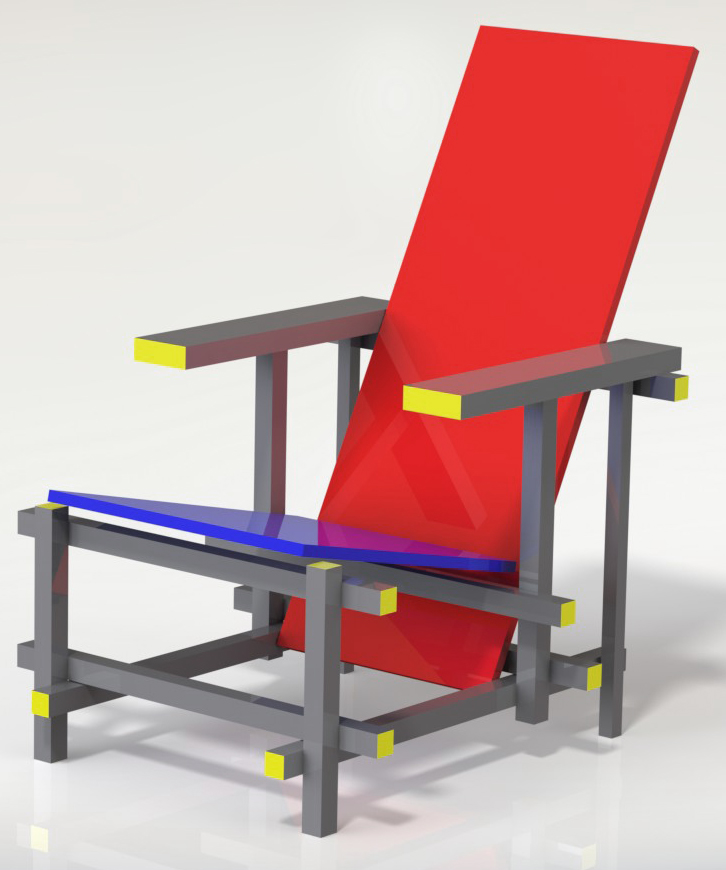
Gerrit Rietveld's Red and Blue Chair

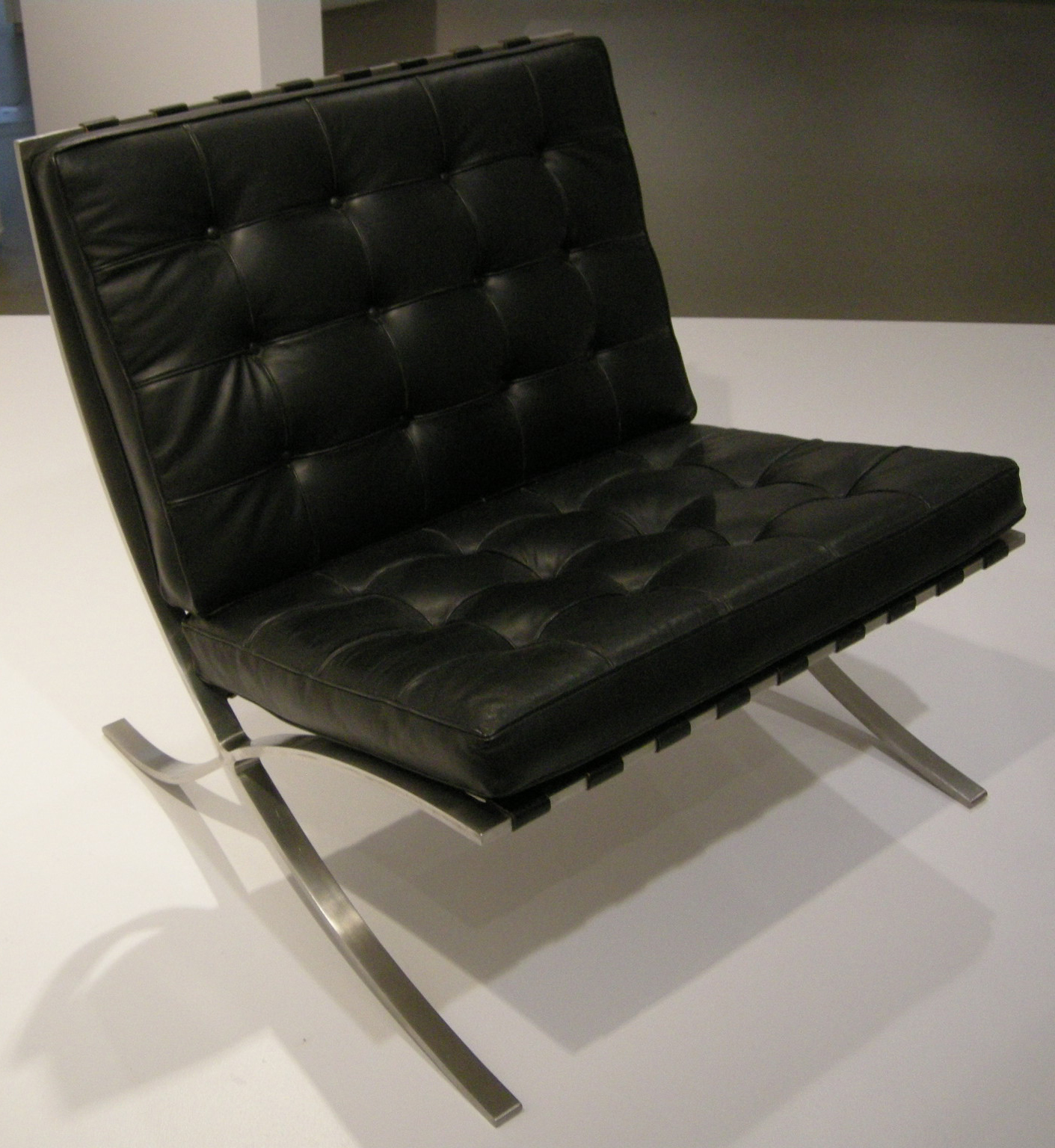
Mies van der Rohe's Barcelona chair

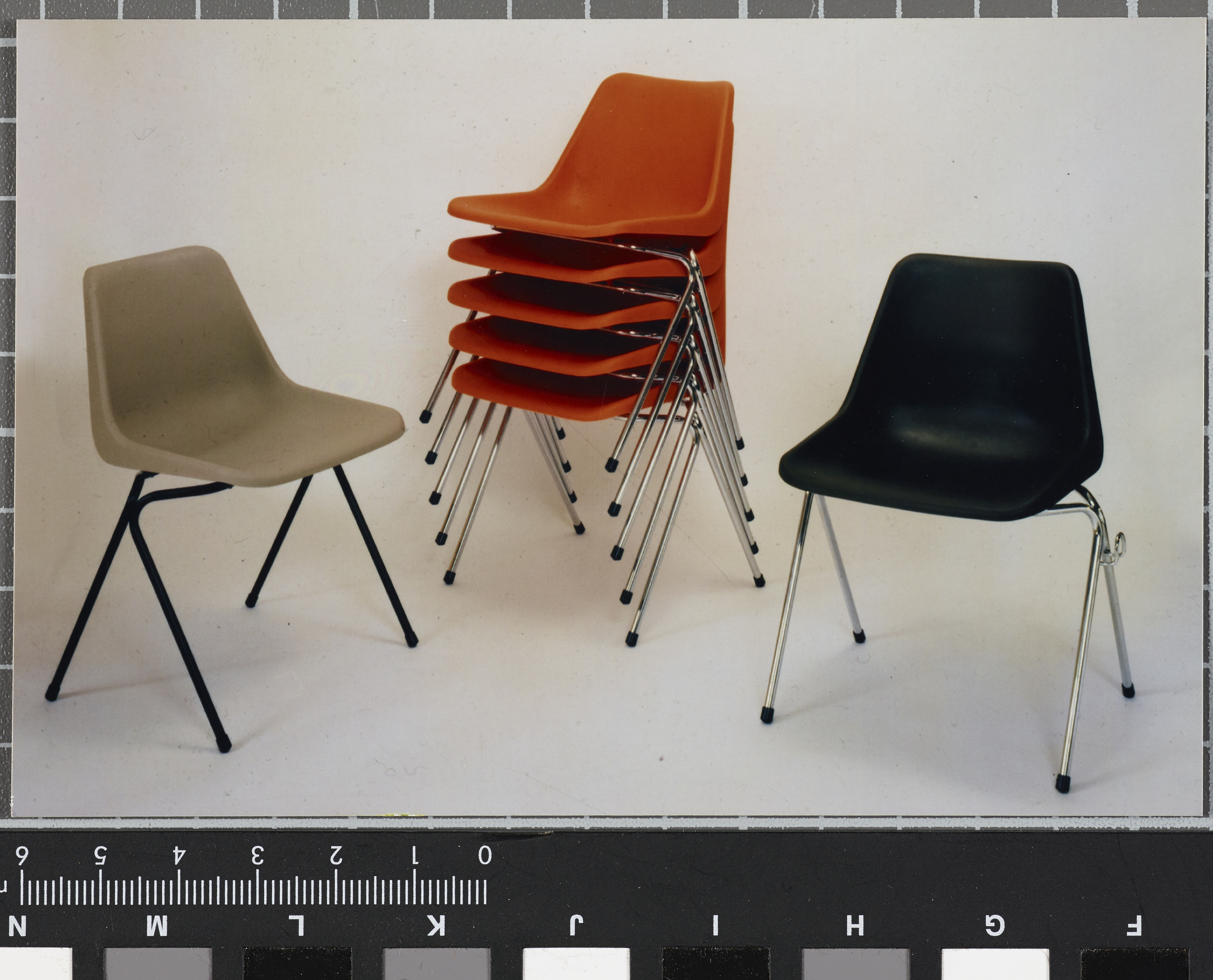
A stack of Robin Day's Polyprop chair

=== Gerrit Rietveld's Red-Blue Armchair ===
The first versions of Gerrit Rietveld's Red-Blue Armchair were created around 1917. However, they were originally stained black – the colour was eventually added to give characteristics of De Stijl in 1923. Rietveld's intent was to design a piece of furniture that could be cheaply mass-produced. He uses standard beechwood laths and pine planks that intersect and are fixed by wooden pegs. The functions of construction, the seat, the back and armrests are explicitly separated from one another visually. In fact, Rietveld saw the chair as the skeleton of an overstuffed armchair with all the excessive components removed.

=== Marcel Breuer's Wassily Chair ===
This modernist creation enjoyed enduring fame in the post-war period, seeing reproduction numbers upwards of four digits across two continents. The Wassily Chair, also known as the Model B3 chair, was designed by Marcel Breuer in 1925–26 while he was the head of the cabinet-making workshop at the Bauhaus, in Dessau, Germany.

This piece is particularly influential because it introduces a simple, yet elegant and light-weight industrial material to be used in structures within the domestic space: chrome plated tubular steel. The design of the chair is revolutionary with its use of symmetrical, geometric planes framed by the tubular steel. Breuer uses simple straps on canvas for the seat, back and armrests to support the seated figure. The concept of the use of tubular steel, a never before seen the material in the domestic space was inspired by the handles of Breuer's bicycle. He reasoned that if such a material was light-weight yet strong enough to support the body in motion, it is likely to be able to support the body at rest. He applies uncomplicated essentials (the canvas strips) to create a functional aesthetic as well. Nonetheless, the Model B3 Chair (dubbed the Wassily Chair by the manufacturing company, Gavina after learning of the anecdote involving the painter Wassily Kandinsky) inspired many artists and designers to include the use of chrome plated steel, including Le Corbusier, who includes it as a structure for his Chaise Longue.

=== Le Corbusier LC4 Chaise Longue ===
Inspired by Marcel Breuer's use of chrome plated tubular steel in his Wassily Chair, in 1928, Le Corbusier creates a sleek steel support for the back and seat of his Chaise Longue. The Chaise Longue features a movable seat section and an adjustable headrest, which is an early example of ergonomic design. With the tubular steel frames and leather or skin upholstery, the sleek Chaise Longue was initially manufactured for private French house commissions including the Villa Savoye, Poissy (1929–31) and the Ville-d'Avray. This piece epitomizes the mass production of the industrial age through the use of materials and structure. However, unlike the Wassily Chair, the complex design made reproduction expensive.

=== Le Corbusier LC2 Sofa ===
The Le Corbusier LC2 are armchairs and sofas with the chrome plated tubular steel frame supporting loose cushions placed on elasticated straps. The LC2 represented the new and modern conception of designer furniture in the Le Corbusier minimalism – style with the steel cage giving an element of industrial. The first results of the collaboration between Le Corbusier and Perriand were three pieces of furniture made with chrome-plated tubular steel frames.

=== Eileen Gray side table ===
Designed in 1927 as a bedside table for the guest room in E-1027, the home Eileen Gray designed for herself (and Jean Badovici) in Cap Martin, France, the asymmetry of this piece is characteristic of her "non-conformist" design style in her architectural projects and furniture. Eileen Gray had always been influenced by Japanese lacquer and furniture, and the minimalist lines and elegant structure found normally in traditional Japanese works are found in most of Gray's objects.

The name, E-1027, can be seen in a somewhat romantic reading: The E stands for "Eileen" and the numbers, corresponding to their sequence in the alphabet, stand for J, B, and G. The second and tenth letter allude to her friend and mentor, Jean Badovici.Gray's emphasis on functionalist design is apparent in her use of tubular steel and the concentric symmetry of the surface. Notably, this piece also has specific utility, as it can be adjusted such that one can eat breakfast in bed on it. Gray's sister had requested such accommodation during her visits to E-1027.

=== Mies van der Rohe Barcelona chair ===
The Barcelona chair has come to represent the Bauhaus design movement. Many consider it to be functional art, rather than just furniture. Designed by Mies van der Rohe and Lilly Reich in 1929 for the German Pavilion at the international design fair, the 1929 Barcelona International Exposition, it is said to have been inspired by both the folding chairs of the Pharaohs, and the X-shaped footstools of the Romans, and dedicated to the Spanish royal families. Like other designers following Breuer's example, he incorporates the use of chrome-plated flat steel bars to create a single S-shaped curve. The front legs cross the 'S' curve of the bars forming the seat and the back legs. It creates a sleek and intentionally simple aesthetic to the piece.

=== Robin Day Polyprop chair ===
In 1963 Robin Day designed the Polyprop chair for the British furniture design house Hille. Made of moulded polypropylene, the Polyprop sold in millions and became the world's best-selling chair. Today it is regarded as a modern design classic, and has been celebrated by Royal Mail with a commemorative postage stamp.

=== Noguchi coffee table ===
Noguchi table was designed by Isamu Noguchi (1904–1988), a sculptor, draftsman, potter, architect, landscape architect, product, furniture and stage designer. Half American, half Japanese, he is famous for his organic modern forms. He often stated, "Everything is sculpture, any materials, any idea without hindrance born into space, I consider sculpture." The Noguchi table – has become famous for its unique and unmistakable simplicity. It is refined and at the same time natural, it is one of the most sought-after pieces associated with the modern classic furniture movement.

== Chronology ==
Chronologically the design movement that produced modern furniture design, began earlier than one might imagine. Many of its most recognizable personalities were born of the 19th or the very beginning of the 20th centuries.

- Walter Gropius 1883–1969
- Lilly Reich 1885–1947
- Ludwig Mies van der Rohe 1886–1969
- Eileen Gray 1878–1976
- Le Corbusier 1887–1965
- Marcel Breuer 1902–1981

They were teaching and studying in Germany and elsewhere in the 1920s and 30s. At among other places the Bauhaus school of art and architecture. The furniture that was produced during this era is today known as "Modern Classic Furniture" or "Mid Century Modern".

Both the Bauhaus School and the Deutscher Werkbund had as their specific creative emphasis the blending of technology, new materials and art.

== Transitional furniture ==
Obviously not all furniture produced since this time is modern, for there is still a tremendous amount of traditional design being reproduced for today's market and then, of course, there is also an entire breed of design which sits between the two, and is referred to as transitional design. Neither entirely modern or traditional, it seeks to blend elements of multiple styles. It often includes both modern and traditional as well as making visual reference to classical Greek form and/or other non-western styles (for example Tribal African pattern, Asian scroll work etc.).

== See also ==
- Alessi
- American Furniture Warehouse
- Art Van
- BoConcept
- Duravit
- Habitat
- Herman Miller
- Hille
- IKEA
- Kartell
- Knoll
- Ligne Roset
- Multifunctional furniture
- Steelcase
- Vitra
