= Robin Day (designer) =

British industrial designer (1915–2010)

Robin Day OBE RDI FCSD
- Born: 25 May 1915; High Wycombe, England
- Died: 9 November 2010 (aged 95); England
- Education: High Wycombe School of Art; Royal College of Art
- Occupations: Furniture and industrial designer
- Known for: Polypropylene chair, Hille furniture, Royal Festival Hall seating
- Spouse: Lucienne Day
- Children: 1
- Website: Robin and Lucienne Day Foundation

Robin Day (25 May 1915 – 9 November 2010) was one of the most significant 20th-century British industrial designers, with a career spanning more than 70 years over several disciplines, ranging from furniture and interior design to exhibitions and graphics.

== Career ==
=== Early life, education and marriage ===
Robin Day grew up in the furniture-making town of High Wycombe in Buckinghamshire. High Wycombe Technical Institute, where he was a junior day student, had close links with the local furniture industry. Day progressed to High Wycombe School of Art in 1931 and then won a scholarship to study design at the Royal College of Art in 1934. On leaving the RCA in 1938, there were no suitable openings in the furniture industry, so he made architectural models and took a teaching post at Beckenham School of Art, where he developed a ground-breaking course in 3D design.

Day met his future wife, Lucienne Conradi, in 1940 at a dance at the RCA, where she was studying printed textile design. They married in 1942, moving into a flat in Chelsea. In 1952 the couple moved to a house on Cheyne Walk, their home and joint studio for the next 50 years.

=== Early post-war design career (1945–1950) ===
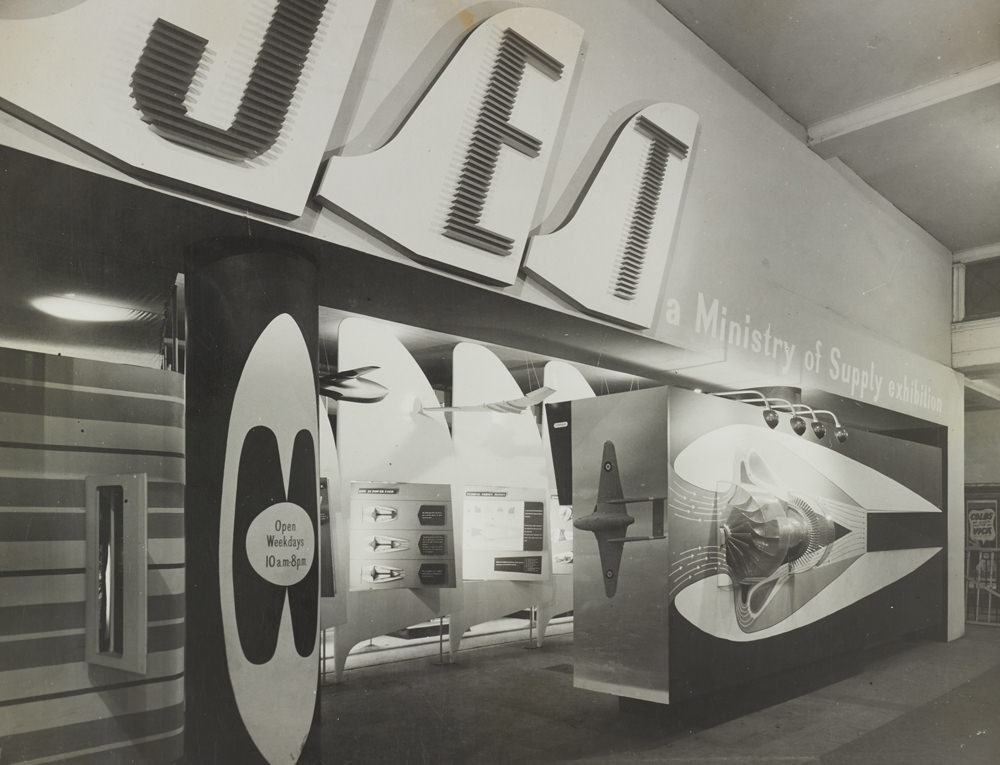
Jet exhibition, 1946

After the Second World War, Robin Day taught interior design at the Regent Street Polytechnic (now the University of Westminster), where he met the architect Peter Moro (1911–1998). The two men formed a partnership in 1946 designing public information exhibitions, mainly for the Central Office of Information and other government organisations, on subjects such as jet engines and scientific instruments. Day continued designing exhibitions and trade stands until the early 1960s for clients such as the radio manufacturer EKCO and the industrial giant ICI. He also designed a series of recruitment posters for the Royal Air Force during 1948–9.

Although the war had impeded Day's ambition to become a furniture designer, his fortunes changed in 1948 when he and Clive Latimer won First Prize in the Storage Section of the International Competition for Low-Cost Furniture Design organised by the Museum of Modern Art in New York. Their concept for a range of multi-purpose storage units fabricated from a tube of pre-formed moulded plywood was widely renowned. Although never mass-produced, a set of prototypes made by Heal & Son in 1949 demonstrated the principles behind the design. Supported on tubular aluminium legs, the cabinets were compact and flexible, with sliding doors, interchangeable shelf and drawer fittings and a writing desk with a drop-down flap.

Day's success in the MOMA competition brought him to the attention of Rosamind Julius and her husband of the S. Hille & Co., a small London furniture firm branching out into modern design. The prize was also instrumental in securing a commission to design the seating for the Royal Festival Hall in 1951, a milestone of Day's career.

=== Festival of Britain and Royal Festival Hall (1951) ===
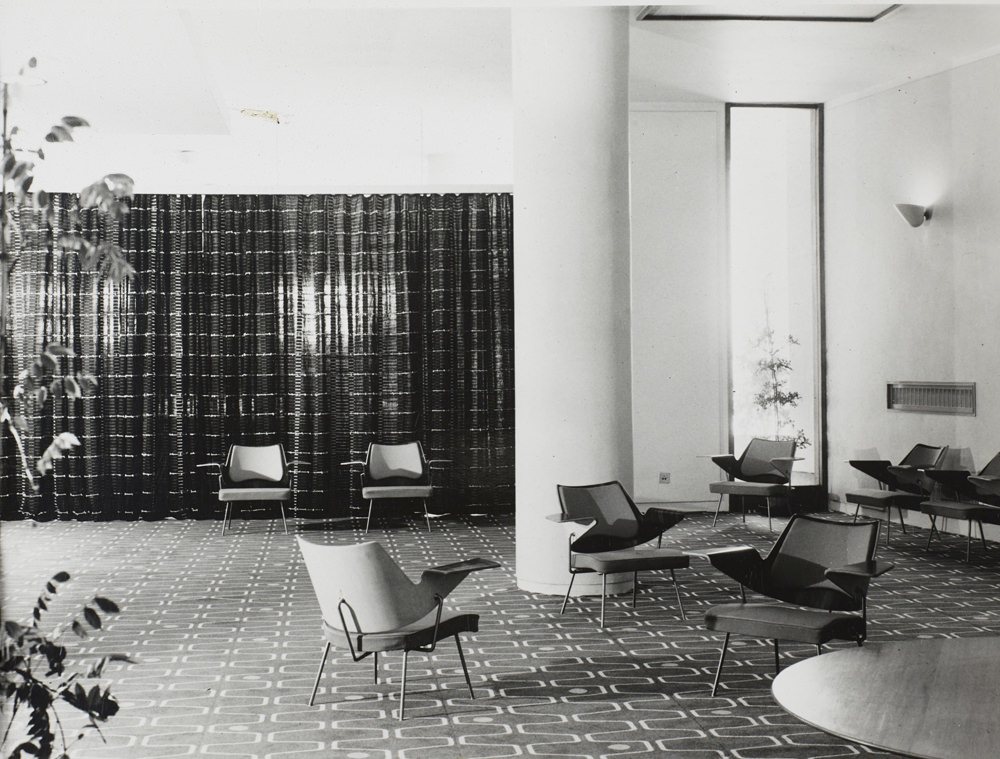
Royal Festival Hall Lounge Chairs in foyer, 1951

Robin Day's seat design for the Royal Festival Hall and his high-profile contributions to the Festival of Britain, held on the neighbouring site on London's South Bank, greatly enhanced his professional reputation. The brief for the Royal Festival Hall project required a wide range of furniture designs, including restaurant and foyer furniture, auditorium seating and orchestra chairs, each with specific functional requirements. Wanting to explore new manufacturing processes, Day co-opted materials and technology from the automotive industry for his concert hall seating, which was fabricated from pressed steel, supported by cast steel stanchions. This chair design is still in use today. The chairs he designed for the restaurant and foyer had sculptural moulded plywood seats with wing-like armrests and spindly black steel rod legs. Day was the first designer in Britain to exploit these materials in furniture.

Day's ingenuity was also evident in the two open-plan living room / dining room settings he created for the Homes and Gardens Pavilion at the Festival of Britain. Designed to illustrate what could be achieved on different budgets, both rooms were equipped with his Royal Festival Hall chairs, along with newly designed storage units. The economy cabinets were in oak, while the luxury cabinets were made from veneered mahogany on a frame of square-section tubular steel.

The Festival acted as a valuable platform for launching Robin Day's pared down 'Contemporary' aesthetic, which was also showcased at the Milan Triennale in 1951. Architects were particularly enthusiastic about his furniture as it fit well with the clean-lined, glass-walled modern buildings that were coming into fashion after the war, in the domestic sphere as well as the public and commercial domain.

=== Furniture Designs for Hille (1950s) ===
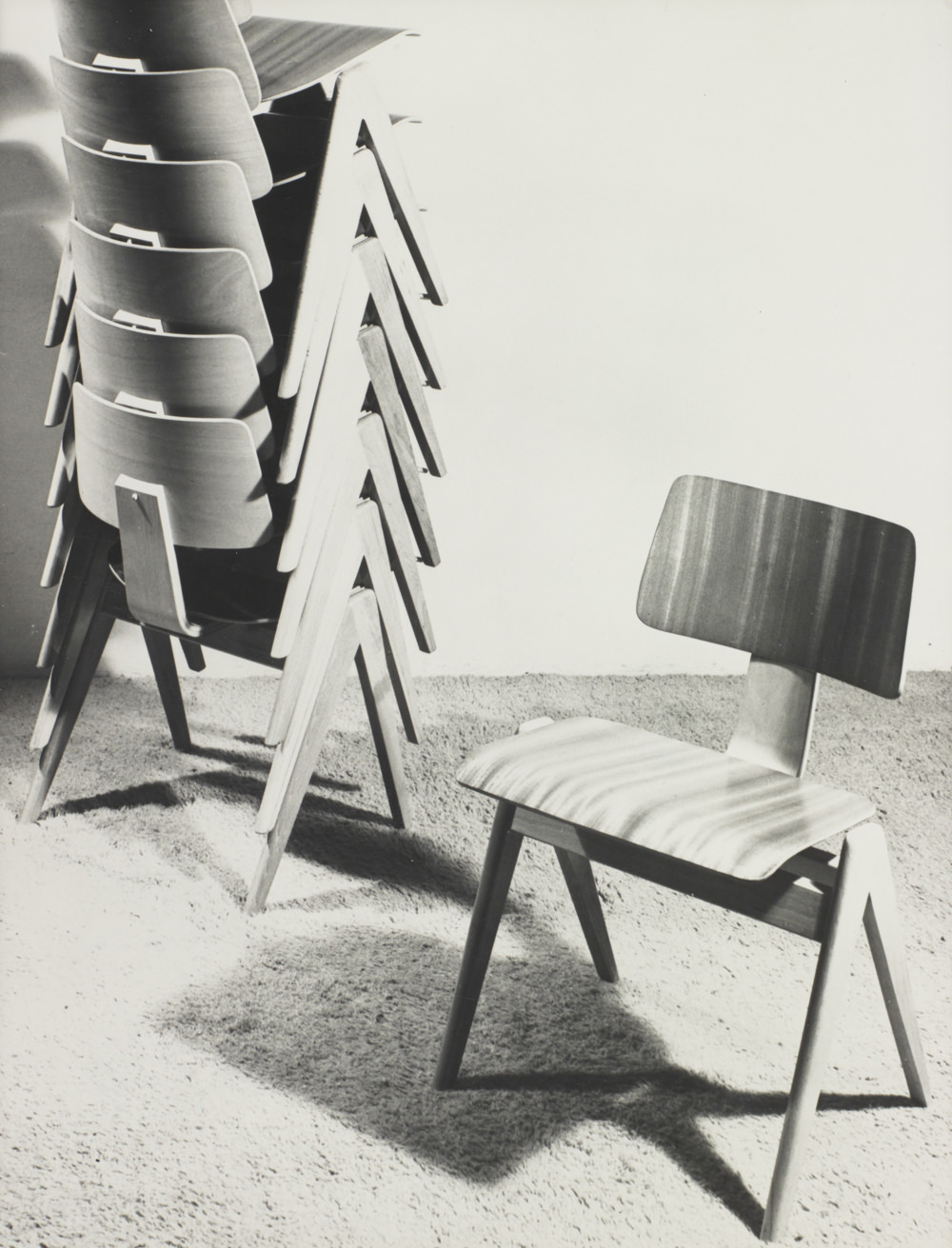
Hillestak chairs, 1951

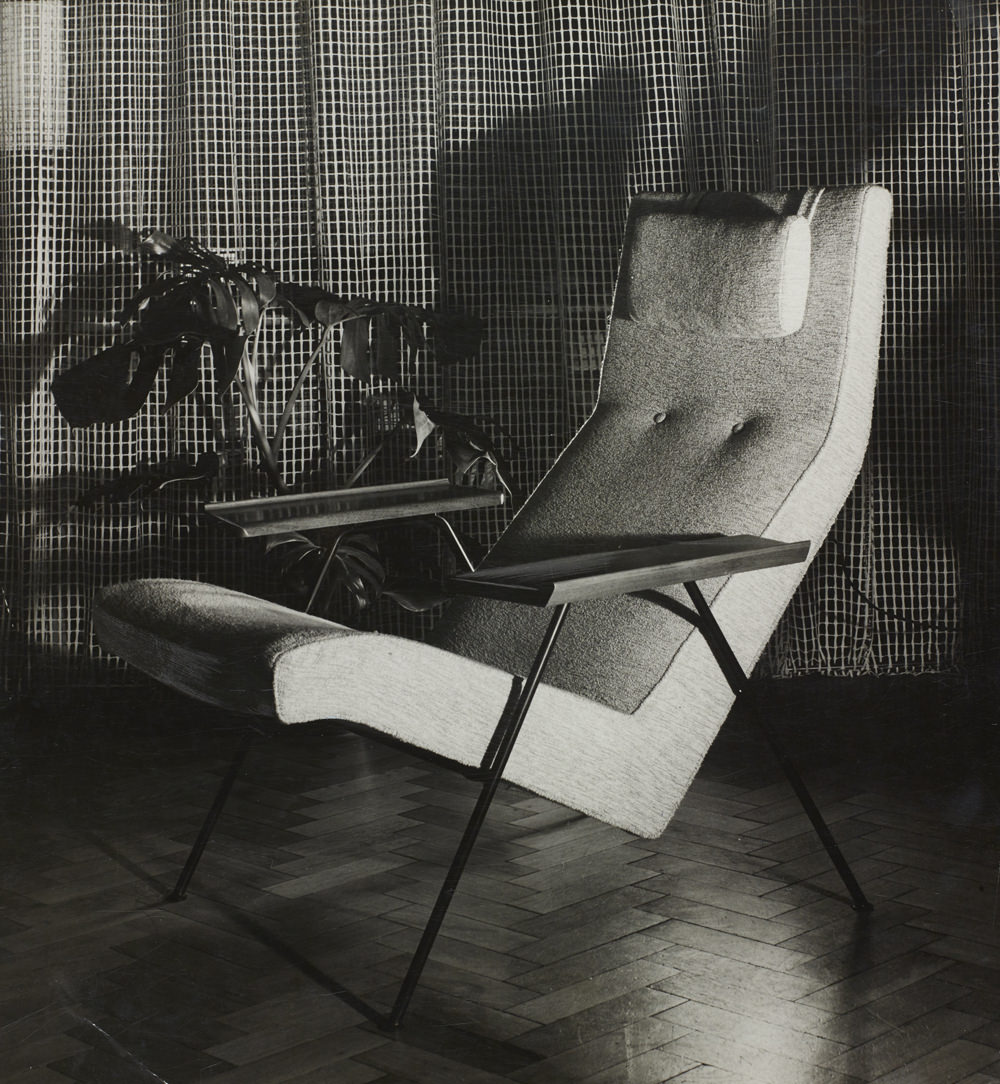
Reclining chair, 1952

Robin Day began designing for S. Hille & Co. – a small cabinet-making firm specialising mainly in high-quality reproduction furniture – in 1949. The company was run by Ray Hille (1900–1986), daughter of Salamon Hille, who had established the company in 1906. At Day's instigation, and with the support of Ray's daughter Rosamind Julius (1923–2010) and son-in-law Leslie Julius, who had recently joined the firm, the company underwent significant changes.

Although Day was never formally employed by Hille, he became their chief designer in effect. For the next 20 years, he created most of Hille's designs. His primary aim was joining functionality and technology. The utilitarian Hillestak Chair (1951), a stacking chair with a beech plywood seat and a solid beech frame, was his first mass-produced design. His Hilleplan (1953) and Interplan Units (1955) was derived from the storage systems he created for the Festival of Britain. Both were modular, so that multiple units could be combined in coordinated groups.

Day's post-war designs were more light and economical than previous chairs. His Reclining Chair (1952), for example, had a slim angular upholstered seat, floating wooden armrests and U-shaped steel rod legs. A minimalist frame was also adopted for the 675 Chair (1953), a dining chair with a slender floating moulded plywood seat back. In the Q Stak Chair (1954), Day's first one-piece moulded plywood shell chair, the number of components was reduced to the bare minimum in order to keep costs down.

Robin Day continued to expand Hille's furniture collections throughout the 1950s, pioneering technical innovations such as frames made of flat bar steel or square-section tubular steel. Day advocated the usage of Pirelli rubber webbing, which he adopted as a replacement for traditional coil-sprung upholstery. He left it exposed as a decorative feature on several designs, including the Gatwick Chair (1958), created for Gatwick Airport, and a modular seating system called the Form Group (1960), one of several Design Centre Award winners.

=== Polypropylene Chair ===
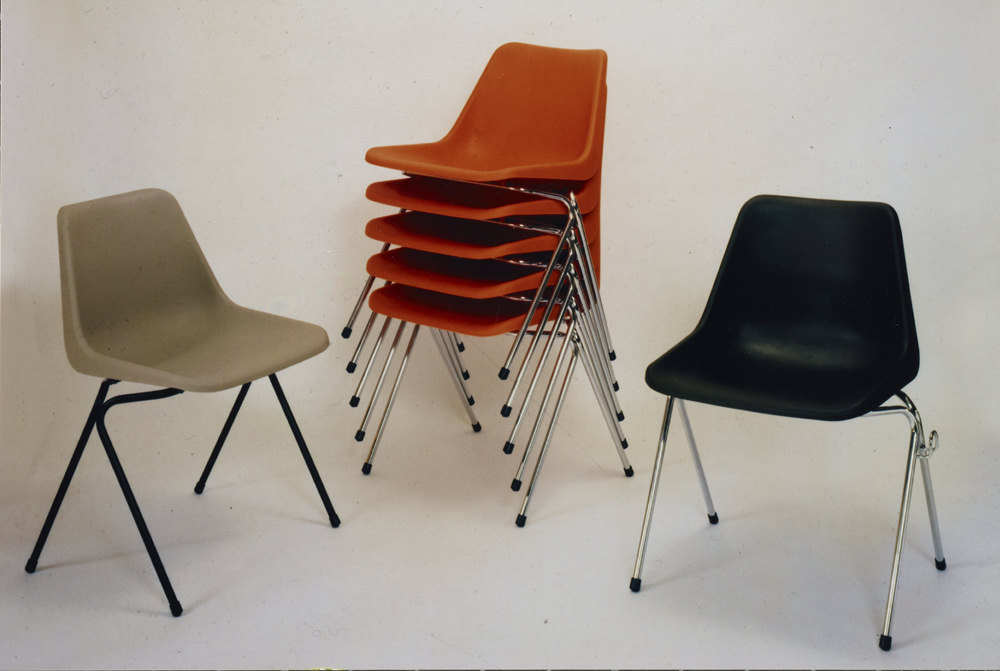
Polypropylene side chairs, 1964

Robin Day is best known for his injection-moulded Polypropylene Chair, originally designed in 1963 for the firm of S. Hille & Co. and still in production today by its successor Hille Educational Products.

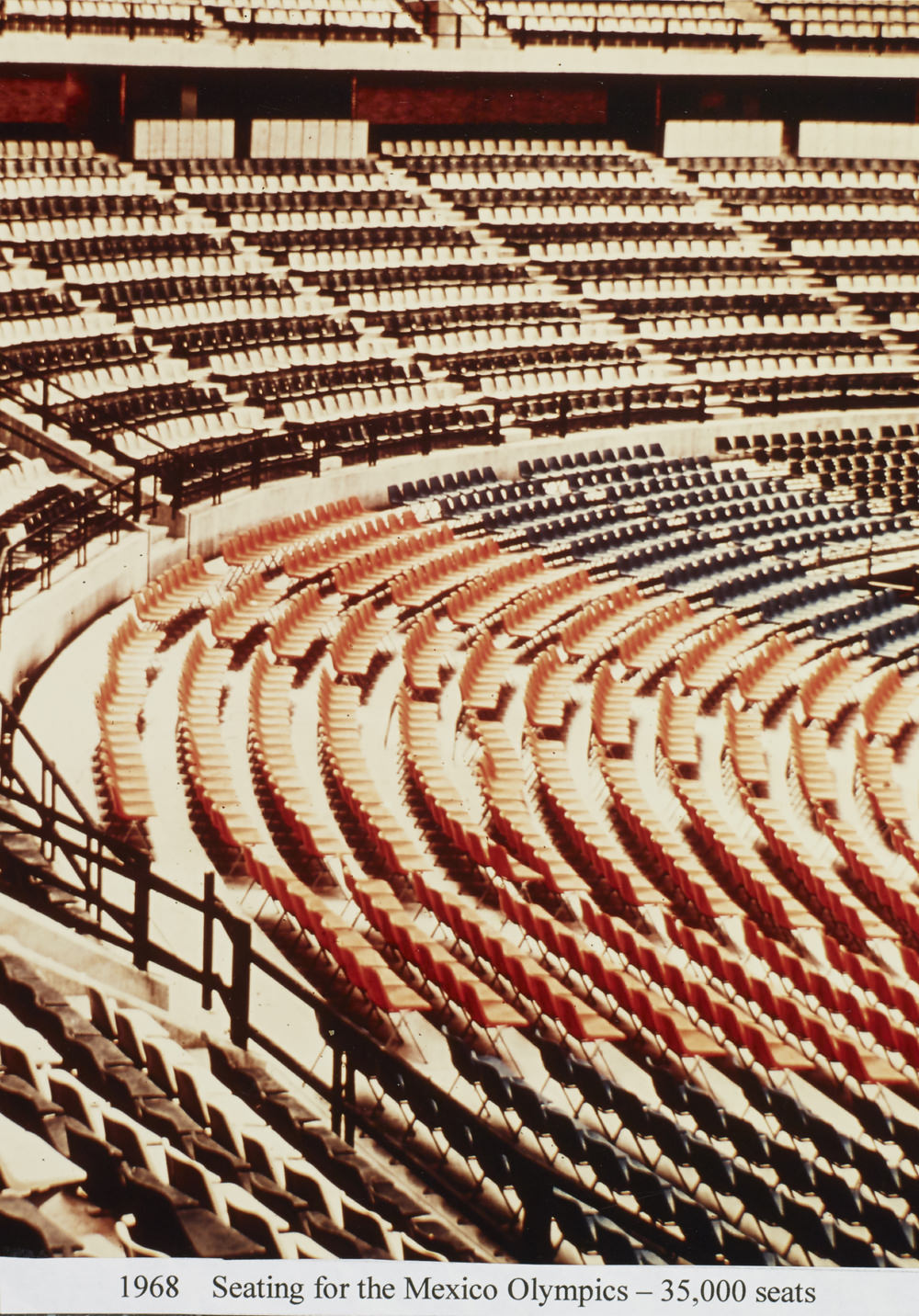
Polypropylene seating at Mexico Olympics 1968

This represented a major breakthrough in furniture design and technology. Originally created as a stacking chair, it was adapted for a variety of applications, ranging from airports to sports stadiums. In 2009 it was selected by Royal Mail to appear on a postage stamp as one of eight designs in a 2009 series celebrating "British Design Classics". Approximately 64 million polyprop chairs had been manufactured as of 2019, with Hille having sold around 14 million of them.

=== Polypropylene Chair Family (1963 to 1975) ===
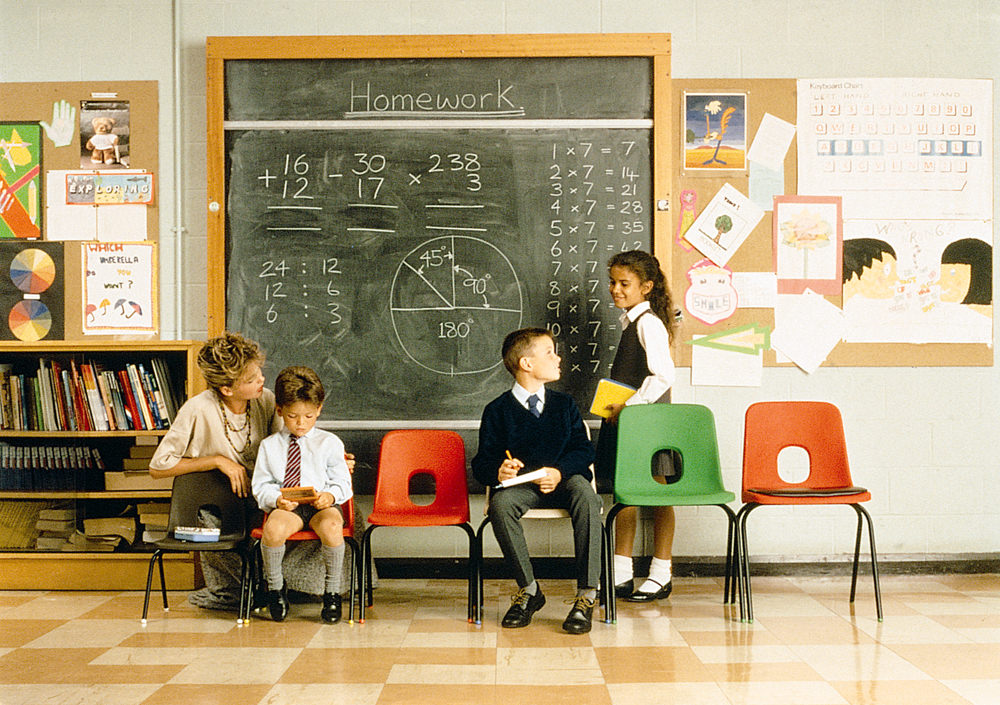
E-series School chairs, 1971

Both the Polypropylene Chair and the Polypropylene Armchair (1967) were designed to accommodate a wide range of different bases. Day later created a range of lightweight polypropylene shell chairs for schools called Series E (1971), produced in five different sizes with an oval hole in the back. His Polo Chair (1975) with its distinctive drainage/ventilation holes was another important addition to the Polypropylene Chair family. Designed for outdoors as well as inside, the Polo Chair was widely used for stadium seating, a specialist field in which Day became increasingly involved. He also experimented with other plastics during the 1960s and 70s, as well as continuing to refine his furniture designs in wood and steel. Examples from 1973 can be seen in the nave seating at Clifton Cathedral, Bristol.

=== Industrial Design and Interiors (1940s to 1970s) ===
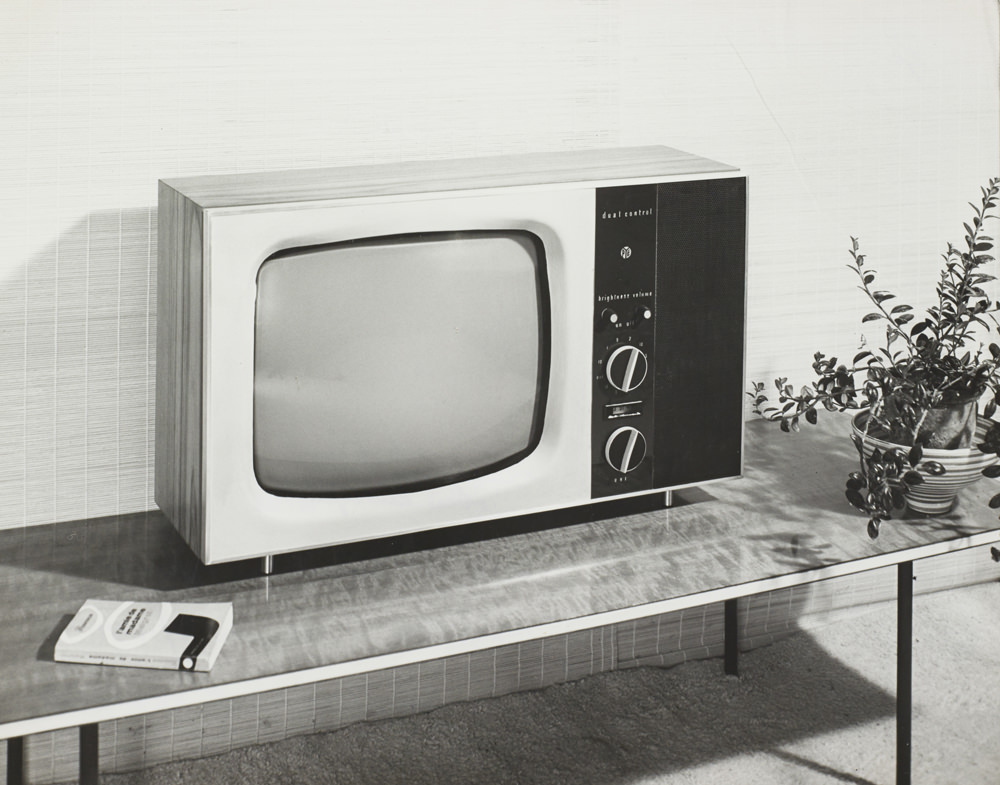
TV for Pye, 1965

Robin Day worked in a wide range of disciplines. Apart from Hille, his two principal industrial clients were the electronics firm Pye, for whom he designed radios and televisions from c.1948–1965, and the carpet manufacturer Woodward Grosvenor, for whom he created abstract designs for wilton carpets from c.1960–1966.

Day continued to collaborate with leading architects on custom-designed furniture for new buildings. In 1964 he designed the oiled teak refectory tables and chairs for the main dining hall at Churchill College, Cambridge, designed by Richard Sheppard, Robson and Partners. His largest and most ambitious commission was the seating for the Barbican Arts Centre, designed by Chamberlin, Powell and Bon, completed in 1981. This project, which occupied him throughout the 1970s, included auditorium seating for the theatre, concert hall and three cinemas, as well as café tables and chairs and long snaking sofas for the foyers.

=== Design Consultancy for John Lewis Partnership and BOAC (1940s to 1970s) ===
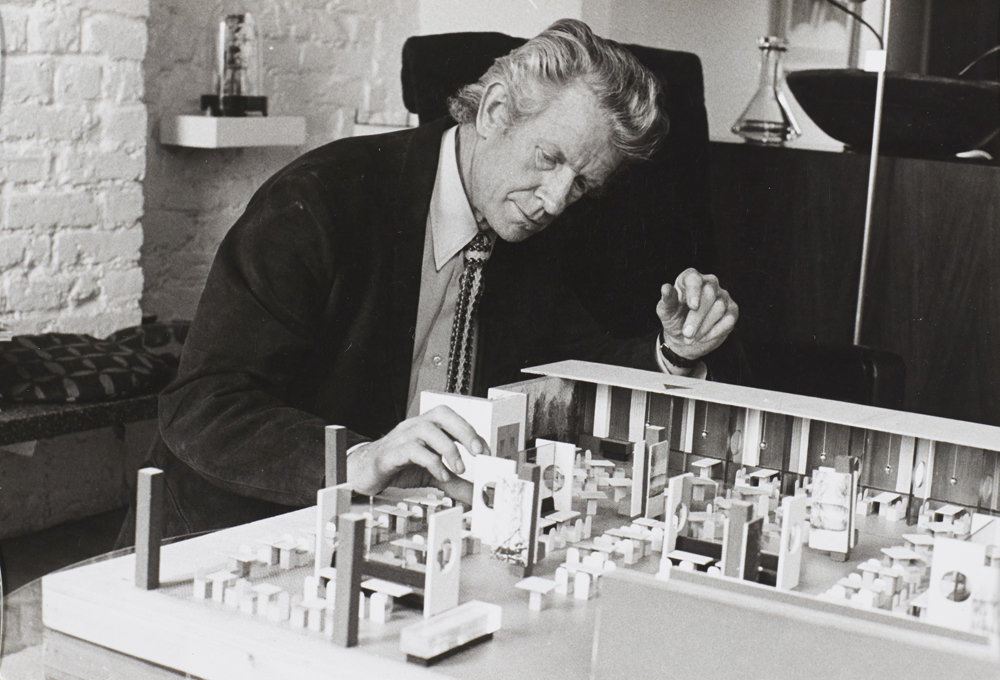
Robin Day with model of John Lewis restaurant, 1973

Although Robin and Lucienne Day shared a studio, they mainly worked in their own spheres, apart from two occasions when they collaborated as joint design consultants to the John Lewis Partnership and BOAC. For the latter they designed interiors for the company's fleet of Super VC10 aircraft during the 1960s. Robin later developed a prototype refreshment tray and tableware for Concorde, although this was never produced.

The Days' involvement were engaged with the John Lewis Partnership as joint design consultants for 25 years between 1962 and 1987. One of their main achievements at JLP was helping to develop a comprehensive new house style, covering needs from in-store signage and product packaging to company stationery and liveries for vans. Robin also designed the interiors of several Waitrose supermarkets and John Lewis department stores, notably Milton Keynes in 1979.

=== Later Designs, Awards and Reissues (1980s to 2000s) ===
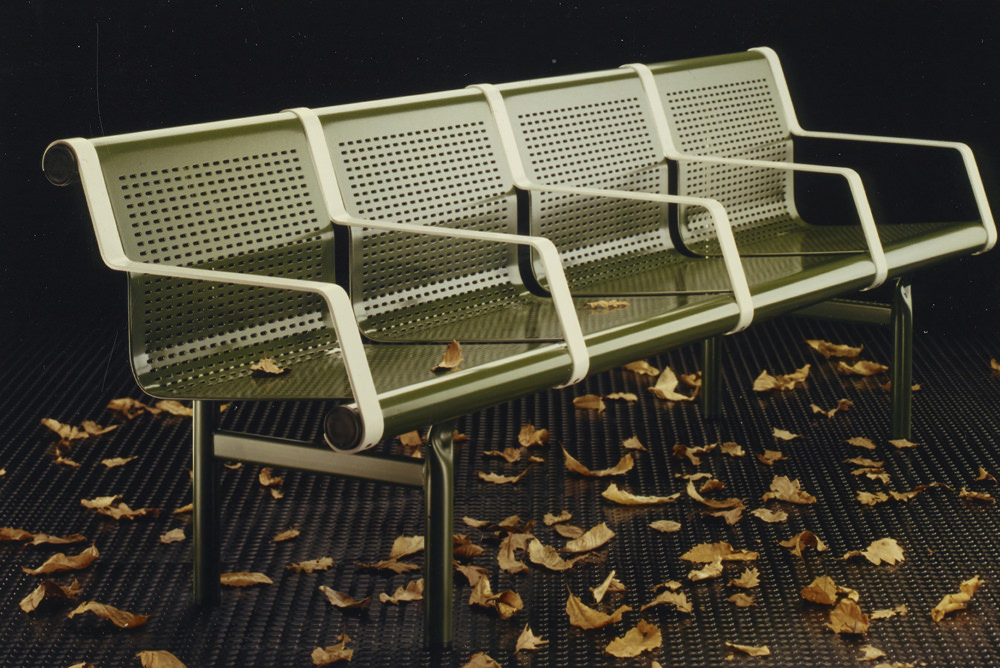
Toro bench, 1990

Public seating had been one of Robin Day's specialities since 1956 when he was asked to design a heavy-duty bench for British Rail. Three and a half decades later, he was invited to design a range of seating for use on London Underground stations. His durable perforated steel Toro Bench (1990) is still widely used today, along with a timber variant called Woodro (1991). These benches are amongst his most popular designs.

During the late 1990s Robin Day's work was championed by Tom Dixon, former Creative Director of Habitat. As well as selling the Polypropylene Chair, Habitat reissued new versions of two of Day's earlier designs, the Forum Settee (1964) in 1999 and the 675 Chair (1952) in 2000. These reissues triggered wider interest in Day's post-war designs and prompted commissions from several other firms.

Since Robin Day's death in 2010, the responsibility for licensing his designs has been taken over by the Robin and Lucienne Day Foundation, established by Paula Day in 2012. Licensees collaborate with the Foundation on authentic reissues of the original designs. They currently include &Tradition (Hillestak Chair and Table, RFH Lounge Chair, Dining Chair and Terrace Chair and Table, all designed in 1951), Case Furniture (675 Chair, Forum Sofa and Armchair) and twentytwentyone (Reclining Chair, Chevron Chair, Slatted Bench).

Robin Day received many honours over the course of his long career. He was appointed a Royal Designer for Industry in 1959 and appointed an OBE in 1983. He was a past winner of the Chartered Society of Designers' highest accolade, the Minerva Medal, awarded for lifetime achievement in the field of design.

== Design philosophy ==
Robin Day's early designs reflected the optimistic mood of the post-war era. 'To many of us then, design was more than just a profession – we were dedicated, competitive and filled with evangelical zeal,’ he later recalled. 'In my long years of designing, the thing that has always interested me is the social context of design and designing things that are good quality that most people can afford,’ he observed in 1999. 'It was always my mission to mass-produce low-cost seating, because I do think that clarity and what we call "good design" is a social force that can enhance people's environments. Day's democratic design ideals were reiterated by Fiona MacCarthy: 'His great aim was to make good design available all over the world, at prices affordable to ordinary people.... He was hugely impressed by the scope of design in Scandinavia. It was part of his emerging philosophy that the designer should influence all details of daily life, and he worked in graphics, exhibitions and interiors as well as designing products.'

Day's use of new technologies to efficiently conserve materials stemmed from the shortages of material following World War II. 'Metal for strength and lightness, rubber for comfort and efficiency, wood for touch and appearance,’ was how he summarised his preferences in 1959. These design practices continued even as construction materials again became available in bulk; his design philosophy began to revolve around "Things should be made because they are better and with regard to the limited resources of the planet, so they should be re-usable and long-lasting. People often think that mere newness is innovation, but it isn't." he declared in 1999 . 'Throughout his life he loved working with his hands,’ noted Lesley Jackson. 'His workshop became an essential adjunct to his design studio, as it was here that he fine-tuned the models for his production furniture. Minutely concerned with every technical and ergonomic detail, his approach to design was always very direct and hands-on.'

== Personal life ==
His wife Lucienne Day, née Conradi (1917–2010) was a renowned textile designer. The couple married in 1942 and had one daughter, Paula Day (born 1954).

== Resources ==
=== Exhibitions and Books ===
Robin and Lucienne Day's post-war design achievements resumed popularity in 1991 in a major international exhibition called The New Look: Design in the Fifties at Manchester City Art Gallery. Ten years later, their careers were covered in depth in a retrospective exhibition titled Robin and Lucienne Day: Pioneers of Contemporary Design at the Barbican Centre, London in 2001. Both exhibitions were curated by design historian by Lesley Jackson, who also wrote the accompanying books. Robin Day's furniture has also been documented in Modern British Furniture: Design Since 1945 by Lesley Jackson, published by the V&A in 2013. These books, based on extensive archive research and interviews with the designers, provide the primary source of information about Robin and Lucienne Day's careers.

An exhibition of Lucienne Day's textiles and Robin Day's furniture, "Robin and Lucienne Day: Design and the Modern Interior", was held between 26 March and 26 June 2011 at Pallant House Gallery in Chichester. The Days' work was also featured in a large exhibition at the V&A Museum in 2012 called British Design From 1948: Innovation in the Modern Age.

In 2015 The Robin and Lucienne Day Foundation celebrated Robin Day's centenary year with the exhibition Robin Day Works in Wood, which was shown at the V&A Museum as part of the London Design Festival.

=== Film ===
A documentary film called Contemporary Days: The Designs of Robin and Lucienne Day, directed by Murray Grigor for Design Onscreen, was completed shortly before Robin Day's death in 2010. The film was premiered at the Royal Society of Arts in the presence of Robin Day in an auditorium furnished with the designer's seating.
