= List of British films of 1963 =

A list of films produced in the United Kingdom in 1963 (see 1963 in film):

== 1963 ==
Title	Director	Cast	Genre	Notes
1963
80,000 Suspects	Val Guest	Claire Bloom, Richard Johnson, Yolande Donlan	Drama	
The Bay of St Michel	John Ainsworth	Keenan Wynn, Mai Zetterling, Ronald Howard	Adventure	Co-production with Greece
Billy Liar	John Schlesinger	Tom Courtenay, Julie Christie, Wilfred Pickles	Drama	Number 76 in the list of BFI Top 100 British films
Bitter Harvest	Peter Graham Scott	Janet Munro, John Stride, Alan Badel	Drama	
The Break	Lance Comfort	Tony Britton, William Lucas, Robert Urquhart	Crime	
Breath of Life	J. Henry Piperno	George Moon, Larry Martyn, Gabrielle Blunt	Crime	
Calculated Risk	Norman Harrison	William Lucas, John Rutland	Crime	
Call Me Bwana	Gordon Douglas	Bob Hope, Anita Ekberg, Edie Adams	Comedy	
The Caretaker	Clive Donner	Alan Bates, Donald Pleasence, Robert Shaw	Drama	Won a Silver Bear at Berlin
Carry On Cabby	Gerald Thomas	Sid James, Hattie Jacques, Charles Hawtrey	Comedy	
Carry On Jack	Gerald Thomas	Kenneth Williams, Bernard Cribbins, Juliet Mills	Comedy	
Children of the Damned	Anton M. Leader	Ian Hendry, Alan Badel	Horror	
The Christine Keeler Story	Robert Spafford	Yvonne Buckingham, John Drew Barrymore, Alicia Brandet	Drama	Co-production with Denmark
Clash by Night	Montgomery Tully	Terence Longdon, Jennifer Jayne	Crime	
Cleopatra	Joseph L. Mankiewicz	Elizabeth Taylor, Richard Burton, Rex Harrison	Drama	Co-production with the United States
Come Fly with Me	Henry Levin	Dolores Hart, Hugh O'Brian	Comedy	
The Cool Mikado	Michael Winner	Frankie Howerd, Stubby Kaye, Tommy Cooper	Musical	
The Cracksman	Peter Graham Scott	Charlie Drake, Nyree Dawn Porter, George Sanders	Comedy	
The Damned	Joseph Losey	Macdonald Carey, Oliver Reed, Alexander Knox	Sci-fi	
Death Drums Along the River	Lawrence Huntington	Richard Todd, Marianne Koch, Albert Lieven	Adventure	Co-production with West Germany
Dr. Crippen	Robert Lynn	Donald Pleasence, Samantha Eggar, Coral Browne	Crime drama	
Doctor in Distress	Ralph Thomas	Dirk Bogarde, James Robertson Justice, Samantha Eggar	Comedy	
Echo of Diana	Ernest Morris	Vincent Ball, Betty McDowall	Drama	
From Russia with Love	Terence Young	Sean Connery, Lotte Lenya, Robert Shaw	Spy/action	
The Girl Hunters	Roy Rowland	Mickey Spillane, Shirley Eaton	Crime	
Girl in the Headlines	Michael Truman	Ian Hendry, Ronald Fraser	Detective	
The Haunting	Robert Wise	Julie Harris, Claire Bloom	Thriller	
Heavens Above!	John and Roy Boulting	Peter Sellers, Bernard Miles	Comedy	
The Hi-Jackers	Jim O'Connolly	Antony Booth, Jacqueline Ellis	Crime	
The Horror of It All	Terence Fisher	Pat Boone, Erica Rogers	Comedy/horror	
I Could Go On Singing	Ronald Neame	Judy Garland, Dirk Bogarde	Musical	Co-production with the United States
Impact	Peter Maxwell	Conrad Phillips, George Pastell	Thriller	
Incident at Midnight	Norman Harrison	Anton Diffring, William Sylvester	Crime	Part of the Edgar Wallace series
The Informers	Ken Annakin	Nigel Patrick, Margaret Whiting, Harry Andrews	Crime	
It's All Happening	Don Sharp	Tommy Steele, Michael Medwin	Musical	
It's All Over Town	Douglas Hickox	Lance Percival, Frankie Vaughan	Musical	
Jason and the Argonauts	Don Chaffey	Todd Armstrong, Nancy Kovack	Fantasy/adventure	
Kiss of the Vampire	Don Sharp	Clifford Evans, Edward de Souza, Jennifer Daniel	Horror	
Ladies Who Do	C.M. Pennington-Richards	Peggy Mount, Harry H. Corbett, Robert Morley	Comedy	
Lancelot and Guinevere	Cornel Wilde	Cornel Wilde, Jean Wallace, Brian Aherne	Adventure	
Live It Up!	Lance Comfort	David Hemmings, Jenny Moss	Musical	
Lord of the Flies	Peter Brook	James Aubrey, Tom Chapin	Drama	
The Man Who Finally Died	Quentin Lawrence	Stanley Baker, Peter Cushing	Thriller	
Maniac	Michael Carreras	Kerwin Mathews, Nadia Gray	Thriller	
The Marked One	Francis Searle	William Lucas, Zena Walker, Patrick Jordan	Crime	
A Matter of Choice	Vernon Sewell	Anthony Steel, Jeanne Moody	Drama	
The Mind Benders	Basil Dearden	Dirk Bogarde, Mary Ure	Drama	
The Mouse on the Moon	Richard Lester	Margaret Rutherford, Ron Moody, Bernard Cribbins	Comedy	
Murder at the Gallop	George Pollock	Margaret Rutherford, Stringer Davis	Mystery	
Mystery Submarine	C.M. Pennington-Richards	Edward Judd, James Robertson Justice	Action	
Nine Hours to Rama	Mark Robson	Horst Buchholz, José Ferrer	Historical drama	
Nurse on Wheels	Gerald Thomas	Juliet Mills, Ronald Lewis, Joan Sims	Comedy	
Offbeat	Cliff Owen	William Sylvester, Mai Zetterling	Crime	
The Old Dark House	William Castle	Tom Poston, Robert Morley	Horror	Remake of 1932 film
Paranoiac	Freddie Francis	Janette Scott, Oliver Reed	Thriller	
A Place to Go	Basil Dearden	Bernard Lee, Rita Tushingham	Crime	
The Punch and Judy Man	Jeremy Summers	Tony Hancock, Sylvia Syms, Ronald Fraser	Comedy	
The Runaway	Tony Young	Greta Gynt, Alex Gallier	Thriller	
The Running Man	Carol Reed	Laurence Harvey, Lee Remick, Alan Bates	Drama	
Sammy Going South	Alexander Mackendrick	Edward G. Robinson, Fergus McClelland, Constance Cummings	Drama	Entered into the 3rd Moscow International Film Festival
The Scarlet Blade	John Gilling	Oliver Reed, Lionel Jeffries	Adventure	
The Servant	Joseph Losey	Dirk Bogarde, Sarah Miles, Wendy Craig, James Fox	Drama	Number 22 in the list of BFI Top 100 British films
The Sicilians	Ernest Morris	Robert Hutton, Reginald Marsh	Thriller	
Siege of the Saxons	Nathan Juran	Janette Scott, Ronald Lewis	Adventure	
The Silent Playground	Stanley Goulder	Roland Curram, Desmond Llewelyn	Thriller	
The Small World of Sammy Lee	Ken Hughes	Anthony Newley, Julia Foster	Drama	
Sparrows Can't Sing	Joan Littlewood	James Booth, Barbara Windsor, Roy Kinnear	Comedy	
Station Six-Sahara	Seth Holt	Carroll Baker, Ian Bannen, Denholm Elliott, Jorg Felmy, Mario Adorf, Peter van Eyck	Drama	Co-production with West Germany
A Stitch in Time	Robert Asher	Norman Wisdom, Edward Chapman	Comedy	
Stolen Hours	Daniel Petrie	Susan Hayward, Michael Craig, Edward Judd	Drama	
Strictly for the Birds	Vernon Sewell	Tony Tanner, Joan Sims	Comedy	
Summer Holiday	Peter Yates	Cliff Richard, Lauri Peters	Musical	
The Switch	Peter Maxwell	Anthony Steel, Zena Marshall	Crime	
Tamahine	Philip Leacock	Nancy Kwan, John Fraser	Comedy	
Tarzan's Three Challenges	Robert Day	Jock Mahoney, Woody Strode	Adventure	Co-production with the United States
That Kind of Girl	Gerry O'Hara	Margaret Rose Keil, David Weston, Linda Marlowe	Drama	
This Sporting Life	Lindsay Anderson	Richard Harris, Rachel Roberts, Alan Badel, William Hartnell	Drama	Number 52 in the list of BFI Top 100 British films
To Have and to Hold	Herbert Wise	Ray Barrett, Katherine Blake	Crime	
Tom Jones	Tony Richardson	Albert Finney, Susannah York, Hugh Griffith, Edith Evans	Comedy	Number 51 in the list of BFI Top 100 British films; winner of four Academy Award's including Best Picture
Two Left Feet	Roy Ward Baker	Michael Crawford, Nyree Dawn Porter	Comedy	
Uncle Vanya	Stuart Burge	Laurence Olivier, Joan Plowright, Michael Redgrave	Tragicomedy	
The V.I.P.s	Anthony Asquith	Richard Burton, Elizabeth Taylor, Louis Jourdan	Drama	
The Very Edge	Cyril Frankel	Anne Heywood, Richard Todd	Drama	
Walk a Tightrope	Frank Nesbitt	Dan Duryea, Patricia Owens	Crime	
West 11	Michael Winner	Alfred Lynch, Kathleen Breck, Diana Dors	Crime	
What a Crazy World	Michael Carreras	Joe Brown, Susan Maughan	Musical	
The Wild Affair	John Krish	Nancy Kwan, Gladys Morgan	Comedy	
The World Ten Times Over	Wolf Rilla	Sylvia Syms, Edward Judd	Drama	
The Wrong Arm of the Law	Cliff Owen	Peter Sellers, Lionel Jeffries	Comedy	
The Yellow Teddy Bears	Robert Hartford-Davis	Jacqueline Ellis, Jill Adams	Drama	

== See also ==
- 1963 in British music
- 1963 in British radio
- 1963 in British television
- 1963 in the United Kingdom
