= 1963 in British radio =

This is a list of events from British radio in 1963.

== Events ==
- 6 January – Alan Freeman takes over as presenter of Pick of the Pops; he remains with the programme until the BBC ceases to broadcast it in 1972, and then with revivals.
- 19 February – Actress Ellis Powell is dismissed from the leading role of Mrs Dale in the BBC Light Programme soap opera The Dales, which she has played since the first episode as Mrs Dale's Diary in 1948, and it is given to former musical actress Jessie Matthews; Powell dies 3 months later aged 57.
- 30 July – Mahler's Second Symphony (1895) gets its first performance at the BBC Proms, and proves so popular that conductor Leopold Stokowski and the London Symphony Orchestra repeat the whole of the final movement as an encore.
- 29 September–December – Don Moss joins Alan Freeman to host Pick of the Pops.
- 23 November – 20th anniversary of the first broadcast of the British Forces Broadcasting Service.
- Martin Esslin is appointed Head of Radio Drama at the BBC, a position he holds until 1977.
- Richard Imison is appointed Script Editor for BBC Radio Drama, a position he holds until 1991.

== Programme debuts ==
- 4 June – Pop Go The Beatles on the BBC Light Programme (1963)

== Continuing radio programmes ==
=== 1940s ===
- Music While You Work (1940–1967)
- Sunday Half Hour (1940–2018)
- Desert Island Discs (1942–Present)
- Family Favourites (1945–1980)
- Down Your Way (1946–1992)
- Have A Go (1946–1967)
- Housewives' Choice (1946–1967)
- Letter from America (1946–2004)
- Woman's Hour (1946–Present)
- Twenty Questions (1947–1976)
- Any Questions? (1948–Present)
- The Dales (1948–1969)
- Billy Cotton Band Show (1949–1968)
- A Book at Bedtime (1949–Present)

=== 1950s ===
- The Archers (1950–Present)
- Listen with Mother (1950–1982)
- From Our Own Correspondent (1955–Present)
- Pick of the Pops (1955–Present)
- The Clitheroe Kid (1957–1972)
- My Word! (1957–1988)
- Test Match Special (1957–Present)
- The Today Programme (1957–Present)
- The Navy Lark (1959–1977)
- Sing Something Simple (1959–2001)
- Your Hundred Best Tunes (1959–2007)

=== 1960s ===
- Farming Today (1960–Present)
- Easy Beat (1960–1967)
- In Touch (1961–Present)
- The Men from the Ministry (1962–1977)

== Births ==
- 14 January – Adjoa Andoh, film, television, stage and radio actress
- 4 April – Graham Norton, Irish actor, comedian, television presenter, columnist and broadcaster
- 2 May – Esther Freud, novelist and broadcaster
- 19 May – Michael Symmons Roberts, poet and radio dramatist
- 20 May – Jenny Funnell, radio and television actress
- 26 May – Simon Armitage, poet laureate and broadcaster
- June – Philip Middlemiss, radio and television actor
- 7 June – Lesley Douglas, BBC radio executive, Controller of Radio 2 and 6 Music from 2004–2008
- 2 July – Mark Kermode, film critic
- 30 October – Wendy Robbins, radio and television presenter and producer
- 3 November – Ian Wright, footballer and radio and television presenter
- 28 November – Armando Iannucci, Scottish broadcast and film writer-producer and presenter
- Unknown
  - Shola Adewusi, stage, screen and radio actress
  - Lynn Bowles, Welsh BBC Radio 2 travel presenter
  - Jeremy Rees, radio presenter

== Deaths ==
- 10 March – Lindley Fraser, Scottish-born academic economist and German-language broadcaster (born 1904)
- 18 March – Peter Eckersley, pioneering radio engineer (born 1892)
- 10 May – Stanley Maxted, war reporter and actor (born 1895)

== See also ==
- 1963 in British music
- 1963 in British television
- 1963 in the United Kingdom
- List of British films of 1963
