= Jo Wheeler =

British weather forecaster

- Born: 3 July 1963 (age 63); Manchester, England
- Occupation: Weather presenter
- Years active: 1983–present
- Employer: Freelance
- Known for: East Midlands Today (1991–94); Sky News (1994–2010, 2010–present, freelance)
- Spouse: Richard Edwards (2000–)
- Children: 2 sons, 3 daughters

Jo Wheeler (born 3 July 1963, Manchester) is an English weather forecaster who currently appears on TalkTV, Sky News and Square Raindrop.

== Early life ==
Her parents married in March 1958. Her grandfather, John Wheeler, was manager of the Grand Hotel in Manchester. The family moved from Cheadle to Wilmslow in January 1967, living at 11 Carrwood Road.

She had three brothers, including Nicholas and Alistair. Her father was TV and radio presenter Peter Wheeler (1934-2010). Her father appeared with Brian Trueman on ITV's North at Six', and on 'Scene at 6.30' with Bob Greaves and Mike Scott in the late 1960s. Her father joined BBC North West from 23 December 1966. Geoffrey Wheeler, her father's older brother, was a producer for BBC North West, and was famous as the presenter of Top of the Form and Songs of Praise. From around 1978 her father had a late night show on Radio 2, for sixteen weeks.

From 1974–78 she attended Wilmslow County Grammar School for Girls, which became comprehensive in 1978, and became part of Wilmslow High School. In April 1978 the boys' and girls' grammar schools took part in a joint production of All's Well That Ends Well, where she played the Countess of Roussillon. From 1978-79 she was at Dean Row County High School, where she gained 8 O-levels in 1979. From 1979–81 she went to the independent Cheadle Hulme School for her sixth-form.

She started a drama course at Manchester Drama School in September 1983, but attended for only four days, when Central TV picked her for an educational children's show.

Aged 19 in August 1982, she appeared in a promotional film for Express Dairies, made by Wyvern TV, of Swindon, to be shown to its 3,000 staff. The actors were David Gillies and Godfrey James, and it was filmed on Groby Road in Crewe.

== Career ==
=== ITV ===
Before joining Sky, Wheeler had spells working for Central East Television as a continuity announcer from 1983 at Lenton Lane Studios, later Carlton Studios, Nottingham. From January 1987 to November 1988 she worked with Orion Airways at Castle Donington.

=== BBC ===
She joined East Midlands Today as one of its first weather presenters when it was launched in 1991. She presented the afternoon weekend programme on Radio Lincolnshire from 1988–93.

=== Sky News ===
She joined BSkyB in October 1994 where she also presented forecasts for Channel 5 until February 2012. She was also voted Best European Weather Presenter in 1998.

She lived in Portugal for a seven-year period with her husband and five children, and commuted to the UK-based Sky News Centre in Isleworth on a weekly basis to present the weather. Because of this, she acted as a live reporter in Praia da Luz during the initial coverage of the disappearance of Madeleine McCann before journalists arrived from London.

In 2010, Sky News carried out a major overhaul of its presentation, removing most of its weather presenters Wheeler now works freelance.

== See also ==
- 1963 in British television
- Mark Radcliffe (radio broadcaster), his father worked with her father at Look North in Manchester, in the late 1960s
