= Pavilion Theatre, Torquay =

Former theatre in Devon, England

Coordinates: 50.4609°N 3.5267°W

Pavilion Theatre
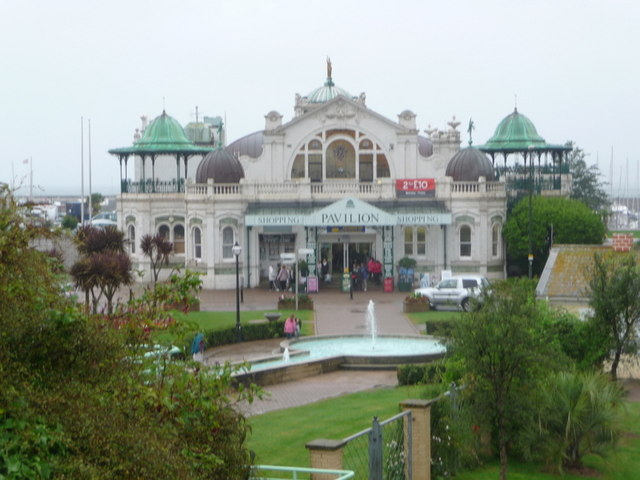
- The Pavilion in 2009, when it was a shopping arcade
- Interactive map of Pavilion Theatre
- Location: Torquay, Devon
- Built: 1912; 113 years ago
- Architect: Edward Rogers
- Architectural style: Art Nouveau style

Listed Building – Grade II
- Official name: Torquay Pavilion
- Designated: 13 March 1973
- Reference no.: 1291553

The Pavilion Theatre was a theatre in Torquay, Devon, England. It was one of the three main auditoriums in Torbay, and during the 1970s differed from the Princess Theatre, Torquay, and the Festival Theatre, Paignton, in that it had plays rather than variety shows during the lucrative summer seasons. It is a Grade II listed building.

== History ==
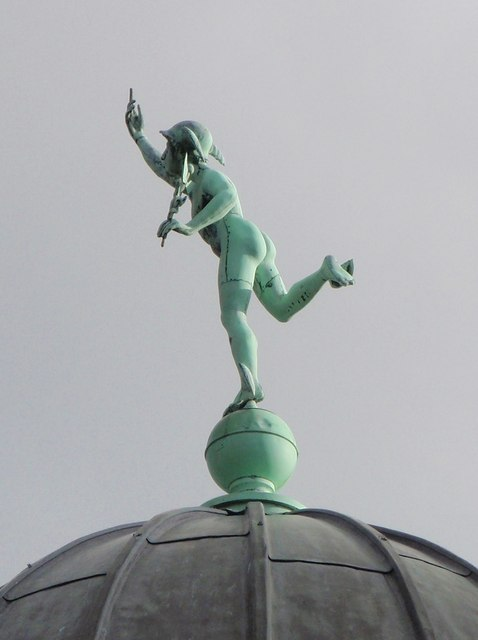
One of the figures of Mercury on a side-dome

The new municipal borough council decided to make a series of improvements after Torquay was made a municipal borough in 1892. In the late 19th century the Borough Engineer of Torbay, Henry Augustus Garrett, started to lay out the Princess Gardens, the Terrace Walk, Pier Pavilion and Torquay Pavilion on Torquay seafront. The Gardens were named in honour of Queen Victoria's daughter, Princess Louise, who laid the foundation stone in 1890.

Part of its site was on land reclaimed from the sea, and it was built on a concrete raft on which a steel framework was erected. The Pavilion's architect was Edward Rogers, who drew up the final plans with H. C. Goss. The plans were passed in 1903, but construction did not start until 1911 due to Rogers' death, and the work was taken over by Garrett. The Pavilion was officially opened by the mayor, Charles Towell, on Saturday 17 August 1912.

The design involved a symmetrical main frontage of five bays facing onto Vaughan Road. The central bay featured a segmental headed entrance with an iron canopy; on the first floor there was a Diocletian window flanked by pairs of Doric order pilasters supporting a gable. The outer bays contained curved structures fenestrated by round headed windows and surmounted by copper domes. The building was faced with white tiles made of Doulton's Carrara-enamelled stoneware. Its central copper-covered dome was topped with a life-size figure of Britannia and two smaller domes on each side bear figures of Mercury. Finely sculpted Art Nouveau-style cast iron edged the steps to the promenade deck and the octagonal bandstands or summer houses.

Apart from the foyer and auditorium, it had lounges and a cafe, all of which were panelled with oak. A municipal orchestra was founded and many famous conductors and singers performed here.

The council proposed demolishing the building in 1973, but it was listed in the same year. It closed in 1976, when it was leased to Rank Organisation and the interior was destroyed in adaptations for various types of amusements, first as a skating rink and then, in the 1980s, as a shopping arcade. As of July 2020, it was closed awaiting restoration; the steel girders which form its framework were heavily corroded. Torbay Council had leased the building to Marina Developments Ltd but that lease was ended in November 2024.

In May 2025, the Victorian Society included the building in its list of the 10 most endangered buildings in the country.

== Shows ==
Shows included:

Year	Show	Notes
1926	The Farmer's Wife	26 – 31 July 1926, Laurence Olivier
1926	Alf's Button	Monday 2 August
1930	The Apple Cart	started 11 August 1930
1930	Rose Marie	started 18 August 1930
1930	The Girl Friend	started 25 August 1930
1930	One Dam Thing After Another	started 1 September 1930
1930	Silver Wings	started 8 September 1930
1930	Lucky Girl	started 15 September 1930
1930	Godfrey Tearle & Mary Malone	started 22 September 1930
1930	Wild Rose	started 29 September 1930
1931	Charley's Aunt	w/c 16 February
1931	Sexton Blake	w/c 23 February
1932	Peg O' My Heart	w/c 15 February
1932	Grumpy	w/c 22 February
1933	The Dubarry	w/c Monday 14 August
1933	Lilac Time	w/c Monday 18 September, Edward Leer
1933	Faust	Wednesday 25 October (matinee)
1933	Madam Butterfly	Wednesday 25 October (evening)
1933	Il Trovatore	Thursday 26 October
1933	Gorno's Italian Marionettes	w/c 31 October
1937	Merrie England	Feb 2 - 6, Torquay Operatic Society
1938	The Burgomaster of Stilemonde	w/c 10 October
1938	The Green Pack	w/c 17 October
1939	Lilac Time	Monday 20 November, Darroll Richards
1948	The Rebel Maid	(June) Torbay Operatic & Dramatic Society
1951	The Desert Song	(June) Torbay Operatic & Dramatic Society
1951	Glamorous Night	(June) Torbay Operatic & Dramatic Society
1955	Beryl Reid	
1955	George Formby	
1955	Music for the Millions	Kay Cavendish
1956	Norman Evans	
1956	Music for the Millions	Jimmy Edwards, Reg Thompson, Harry Worth (Sept 17th for 6 days)
1956	Elsie & Doris Waters	
1956	Ken Tones	
1958	Variety Show	w/c Monday 26 May, Pavilion Orchestra, et al.
1958	Variety Show	w/c Monday 2 June, Jimmy Young, Arthur English, George & Lydia
1958	Perchance to Dream	w/c Monday 9 June, Torbay Operatic & Dramatic Society
1960	Ken Dodd 'Startime'	June to October
1960	Cinderella	Ruby Murray
1961	Laughing Room Only	Jimmy Jewel, Ben Warriss
1962	The Cigarette Girl	Week commencing Monday 28 May. By William Douglas-Home.
1962	Ballet Rambert	4 June
1962	The Gimmick	11 June, starring Dave King
1962	What a Racket	19 June-29 September, Maggie Millward, Jessie Matthews, Arthur Askey, Jack Douglas, Billy Tasker, Adele Strong, Bunny May, Linda James, Carole Gosheron and Michael Lomax.
1963	Best Laid Schemes!	Summer season commencing Wednesday 12 June. By Philip Weathers. Starring Thora Hird, Sydney Tafler, Freddie Frinton, Wendy Lovelock, William Maxwell, Barbara Bruce, Linda Bennett, Raymond Graham
1964	We're Frying Tonight!	Summer season play by John Waterhouse. Starring Jimmy Clitheroe, Albert Burdon, Eddie Molloy, Mollie Sugden, Robert Webber, William Moore, Lynda Reynolds, Philip Clive, Tommy Godfrey, Billy Windsor
1965	Doctor at Sea	John Slater, Edward Rigby, Andrew Ray
1968	Wedding Fever	Sid James, Beryl Mason, John Inman, Kathleen Worth, Robert Blacklock
1969	Stand by your Bedouin	Dickie Henderson
1970	Don't Tell the Wife	with Jack Douglas
1971	The Mating Season	with Sid James, Beryl Mason
1972	Stop It Nurse	with Charles Hawtrey, Kenneth Connor, Bernard Bresslaw
1973	Busman's Holiday	with Bob Grant, Stephen Lewis and Anna Karen
1975	Move Over Mrs Markham	with Tessie O'Shea, Ian Cullen, Virginia Stride, John Clegg and Jan Hunt
1976	The Eric Sykes Show	with Eric Sykes, Hattie Jacques, Derek Guyler
