= What Do We Do Now? =

1946 British film by Charles Hawtrey

- Trade advertisement
- Directed by: Charles Hawtrey
- Written by: George A. Cooper
- Produced by: Maurice J. Wilson
- Starring: George Moon; Burton Brown; Gloria Brent
- Cinematography: Charles Hawtrey
- Production company: Grand National Film Productions
- Release date: 1946
- Running time: 75 minutes
- Country: United Kingdom
- Language: English

What Do We Do Now? is a lost 1946 British second feature ('B') film directed by Charles Hawtrey and starring George Moon, Burton Brown and Gloria Brent. It was written by George A. Cooper and produced by Maurice J. Wilson.

It is notable for being one of only two films directed by Hawtrey. The other is Dumb Dora Discovers Tobacco (1946).

== Preservation status ==
It is believed to be a lost film. The British Film Institute National Archive holds no stills or ephemera, and no film or video materials.

== Plot ==
Wesley and Lesley are comedians performing at the Skewball Hippodrome. When fellow artiste Birdie Maudlin has her diamond brooch stolen, they turn amateur detectives. The robbery story forms the background to a series of music hall acts.

== Cast ==
- George Moon as Wesley
- Burton Brown as Lesley
- Gloria Brent as Diana
- Harry Parry as Frank Arundel
- Ronald Frankau as drunken patron
- Jill Summers as Birdie Maudlin
- Leslie Fuller as taxi driver
- Edmundo Ros's Conga Band as themselves
- Tom F. Moss as Vocali
- Ivor Barnard as Ted Goof
- Barry Lupino as Jeff
- Monti Crick as drunken patron
- Artie Ash as talent scout
- Maurice Bryceson as talent scout
- Douglas Steward as manager
- Vic Hagen as stage manager
- Gordon Begg as stage door keeper
- Raymond Herd as call boy
- Harry Parry and his Radio Rhythm Club Sextet Swing Band as themselves
- Gail Page as herself
- Steffani and his Thirty Silver Songsters as themselves

== Production ==
Location filming took place at Collins's Music Hall in Islington, London.

== Reception ==
The Monthly Film Bulletin wrote: "A thin story and poor dialogue serve merely as links between a series of music-hall turns by such artists as Ronald Frankau, Gloria Brent, Harry Parry, Jill Summers, Leslie Fuller, Edmundo Ros' Conga Band and Steffani and his Thirty Silver Songsters. George Moon is amusing as Wesley and receives adequate support from Burton Brown as Lesley, but the off-stage performances of some of the music-hall artists are very amateurish."

Kine Weekly wrote: "Crude and witless British musical extravaganza, with a provincial musical setting. ... Here we have a pathetic attempt to make a British Helzapoppin. Intentions are honourable, but wit and showmanship are completely lacking. Its laughs can be counted on a mittened-hand. We say no more, except to remind the provincial and industrial exhibitor that it has star value and carries the feature quoted ticket."

In The British 'B' Film Chibnall and McFarlane call the film a "lame comedy".
