= Peter Wheeler (broadcaster) =

British TV and radio broadcaster and actor (1934–2010)

- Born: 8 December 1934; West Hartlepool, England
- Died: 18 May 2010 (aged 75); Manchester, England
- Occupation: Actor • Presenter
- Years active: 1969–2003
- Children: 3 including Jo

Peter Keith Wheeler (8 December 1934 – 18 May 2010) was an English television and radio broadcaster and actor.

== Early life ==
Wheeler was born on 8 December 1934 in West Hartlepool.

He grew up in the north west of England, was educated at William Hulme's Grammar School, and first appeared as a boy actor in radio dramas.

== Career ==
Wheeler began presenting news reports and conducting interviews for Granada Television in the early 1960s, before working for BBC TV on Crossword On Two, a quiz show, and Call My Bluff in 1967. At around the same time, he also hosted the Granada children's quiz Junior Criss Cross Quiz. In 1971, he created and hosted another quiz, Full House, for Thames TV.

He regularly contributed narrations, credited as "court reporter", for the Granada TV drama series Crown Court between 1972 and 1984. In 1974 he started working, mainly as an off-screen voice, on What the Papers Say, at first on ITV and later Channel 4 and then BBC2. He also made appearances, often as himself, in television dramas including The Villains in 1964, and Coronation Street, in which he made several appearances between 1975 and 2001. He appeared as the toastmaster in a televised competition for after-dinner speakers, M'Lords, Ladies and Gentlemen, on Granada TV in 1978–79. His other work included a period hosting Come Dancing, and he narrated and presented many documentaries and training films from the 1960s onwards.

He formed his own broadcasting consultancy business, Peter Wheeler Associates, in 1981.

== Personal life and death ==
He had three sons and a daughter, Jo Wheeler. He was the younger brother of broadcaster Geoffrey Wheeler. He lived in Carrwood Road in Wilmslow.

Wheeler died of a heart attack aged 75 on 18 May 2010.
