= Geoffrey Wheeler (broadcaster) =

English broadcaster (1930–2013)

- Born: 24 September 1930; Manchester, England
- Died: 30 December 2013 (aged 83); Prestbury, Cheshire
- Occupation: Broadcaster
- Television: Songs of Praise; Top of the Form
- Spouse: Sheila Sinclair (m. 1954)
- Children: 2
- Relatives: Peter Wheeler (brother)

Geoffrey Wheeler (24 September 1930 – 30 December 2013) was an English broadcaster who presented and developed a range of factual and entertainment programmes on radio and television, including the BBC's Songs of Praise and Top of the Form.

== Life and career ==
Wheeler was born in Manchester, but as a child he lived in various places in Britain as his father worked as a hotel manager. While at the Grand Hotel near Piccadilly Gardens in Manchester both he and his younger brother, Peter, met Trevor Hill a BBC producer who regularly put up BBC guests there and for whom they appeared on BBC Radio's Children's Hour. He studied law at the University of Manchester. After auditioning for a radio drama, Wheeler made some 200 radio broadcasts for the BBC while still a student. In 1954 he became a trainee BBC radio producer for the Northern England region, making variety programmes with comedians such as Benny Hill and Morecambe and Wise, and rose to become senior programme producer for the region by 1962. He also began working as a television host on programmes including Come Dancing and, in 1960, an innovative early-evening regional programme using mobile cameras, Lookout.

After going freelance in 1963, he presented the school quiz show Top of the Form on BBC television from the early 1960s until the mid-1970s. For Yorkshire Television he presented the educational drama series How We Used to Live in 1969 and created the game show Winner Takes All. Wheeler set the questions and provided voiceovers on the show, which was first broadcast in 1975 and which was based around betting odds. The show was initially hosted by comedian Jimmy Tarbuck before Wheeler briefly presented it in 1987–1988.

Between 1965 and 1985, Wheeler presented the BBC's religious programme Songs of Praise on many occasions. He also appeared on Call My Bluff and Jackanory. From the 1990s Wheeler presented nostalgic BBC Radio programmes drawing on the corporation's archives, many covering the lives of show business performers in Britain earlier in the century.

Wheeler died after a lengthy illness in a Prestbury, Cheshire, hospice. Peter Wheeler (1934–2010), remembered for his voiceover work, was his brother.

He was also a lay reader in the Church of England.
