= Winner Takes All (game show) =

British TV game show (1975–1988)

- Genre: Game show
- Created by: Geoffrey Wheeler
- Presented by: Jimmy Tarbuck; Geoffrey Wheeler; Bobby Davro
- Starring: Vicky McDonald
- Announcer: Geoffrey Wheeler; Gaynor Barnes
- Country of origin: United Kingdom
- Original language: English
- No. of series: 14 (ITV); 1 (Challenge TV)
- No. of episodes: 248 (inc. 3 specials) (ITV); 65 (Challenge TV)

Production
- Running time: 30 minutes (inc. adverts)
- Production company: Yorkshire Television

Original release
- Network: ITV
- Release: 20 April 1975 – 28 June 1988
- Network: Challenge TV
- Release: 5 May 1997 – 1997

Winner Takes All is a game show that aired on ITV from 20 April 1975 to 28 June 1988, first hosted by Jimmy Tarbuck from 1975 to 1986 and then hosted by Geoffrey Wheeler from 1987 to 1988. The show then returned to the screens in 1997, this time on Challenge TV hosted by Bobby Davro.

== Gameplay ==
The two contestants started with 50 points each (30 points when it became a daytime show in 1988) and were asked multiple choice questions with six possible answers but each answer had some odds (Evens (removed by 1986), 2–1, 3–1, 4–1, 5–1 & 10–1) and after each question was asked, the contestants were asked how many points they would like to bet (up to 50 (30 in 1988)) and then, they selected the odds that corresponded to the answer they thought was correct, if they got the correct answer, they won the points the odds were worth, if they gave a wrong answer, they lost the points. After five questions, the contestant with the most points would go through to the final while the loser left the show with nothing. In later series, the losers took home a filofax (except the 1988 series where they took home an encyclopedia). In the Challenge TV version, the losers took home an assortment of games, a watch, and a paperweight. Then, they played again with two different contestants and the winner of that met the winner of the first game.

The two winners played for cash in the final and only the winner took the money home while the loser took home a consolation prize of £100. Until 1981, up to £1,000 could be won. The winning contestant was given the option of returning on the next show to add to his or her winnings, but if they returned and lost they would lose all but £100 of their winnings. By 1979, a defeated champion lost half the winnings.

In 1997, the final was played for points and the winner could accept a prize and leave the show or return for the first semifinal on the next show in an attempt to win a more valuable prize. Any champion who won five days in a row won a holiday in Las Vegas.

== Production ==
From 1980 until 1987, Winner Takes All started with an alternative version of the Yorkshire Television ident where the chevron would spin toward the screen revealing the four contestants who appeared on that week's edition. The final ITV series in 1988 was a Television Techniques production for Yorkshire Television.

The Challenge version was recorded at the former TVS studios at Vinters Park in Maidstone, but was produced by Yorkshire Television.

During his run as host, Jimmy Tarbuck would at the start of some editions come out carrying a briefcase containing £1,000 in £1 notes which was the top prize on Winner Takes All.

In 1989, Iorworth Hoare was jailed for rape after being identified from a photo he submitted to the show when applying to be a contestant.

== Transmissions ==
=== ITV era ===
==== Series ====
Series	Start date	End date	Episodes
1	20 April 1975	13 July 1975	13
2	14 May 1976	6 August 1976	13
3	1 July 1977	23 September 1977	13
4	14 April 1978	7 July 1978	13
5	16 March 1979	11 November 1979	22
6	16 May 1980	29 August 1980	16
7	5 June 1981	4 September 1981	14
8	11 June 1982	10 September 1982	14
9	1 July 1983	7 October 1983	14
10	25 May 1984	24 August 1984	14
11	26 May 1985	25 August 1985	14
12	25 May 1986	24 August 1986	14
13	20 July 1987	4 September 1987	14
14	11 April 1988	28 June 1988	60

- Series 1: The series was not fully networked (initinally only shown in the Yorkshire, Tyne Tees and Border regions) other regions not showing until later in the year, with Granada and HTV not broadcasting the series. LWT started broadcasting the series on 22 August 1975.
- Series 14: Grampian and Scottish started on 20 April, but Scottish Television finished on 7 July 1988, while Grampian completed the series on 15 July 1988; a number of episodes were held back.

==== Specials ====
Date	Entitle
23 December 1977	All Star Special
26 December 1979	All Star Special
29 June 1986	World Cup Special (shown as part of series 12)
28 December 1986	Christmas Special

=== Challenge TV era ===
Series	Start date	End date	Episodes
1	5 May 1997	1997	65
