= Norman and Henry Bones, the Boy Detectives =

British radio children's programme (1943–1965)

- Genre: Children's
- Running time: 30 minutes
- Country of origin: United Kingdom
- Language: English
- Home station: BBC Home Service
- Starring: Charles Hawtrey; Patricia Hayes; Harold Reese
- Written by: Anthony C. Wilson
- Produced by: Josephine Plummer (1943–1960); Graham Gauld (1960–65)
- Original release: 17 July 1943 – 9 April 1965
- No. of episodes: 108

Norman and Henry Bones, the Boy Detectives is a British radio children's drama mystery programme, broadcast by the BBC Home Service between 1943 and 1965 as part of Children's Hour.

It was created and scripted by Anthony C. Wilson (1916–1986), a schoolmaster at Feltonfleet Preparatory School, Cobham, Surrey, and a writer and amateur filmmaker.

== Premise ==
Each episode finds cousins Norman and Henry Bones, aged 16 and 14 respectively, on a different adventure, either in the fictitious fenland village of Sedgewick, or elsewhere.

== Cast ==
Charles Hawtrey played Norman Bones from the first episode through to "A Case of Coins" (1960), after which he left the series. Harold Reese played the role in subsequent episodes.

Peter Mullins played Henry Bones in the first two episodes, with Robert Raikes taking over in the third. Patricia Hayes played Henry for the remainder of the series.

Each episode featured a supporting cast.

== Episodes ==
Of the 108 episodes listed in the BBC Archive, only one complete programme, "The Cry of the Curlew" (originally broadcast 22 July 1950), is available for listening.

- "Mystery at Ditchmoor" (1943)
- "The Doctor Disappears" (1944)
- "Moonlight Castle" (1944)
- "The Invisible Thief" (1944)
- "Prisoner At Large" (1944)
- "The Trap-Door Mystery" (1945)
- "The White Owl" (1945)
- "Express Delivery" (1945)
- "Hunter's Moon" (1945)
- "The Mystery of Brookside School" (1945)
- "Stolen Plans" (1946)
- "The Trunk without a Keys" (1946)
- "A Missing Show Dog" (1947)
- "The Mysterious Lodger" (1947)
- "Deadly Nightshade" (1947)
- "Secret Headquarters" (1947)
- "The Giant's Head" (1948)
- "The Midnight Visitor" (1948)
- "Mystery Tour" (1948)
- "The Phantom Telephone" (1949)
- "Golden Pride" (1949)
- "The Secrets of Lagdon Fell" (1949)
- "Surprise Packet" (1949)
- "The Witch Who Couldn't Fly" (1949)
- "State Secrets" (1949)
- "The Cry of the Curlew" (1950)
- "Lights Out At Nine" (1950)
- "Secret Society" (1950)
- "Autumn Holiday" (1950)
- "A Hand Unseen" (1950)
- "The Great Attraction" (1951)
- "The Secret of the Black Box" (1951)
- "The House of Shadows" (1951)
- "The Mystery of Tyford Towers" (1951)
- "The North Wind Doth Blow" (1951)
- "Good Morning Mr Valentine" (1952)
- "The Pick of the Bunch" (1952)
- "The King John Goblet" (1952)
- "Lost Property" (1952)
- "The Devil's Pool" (1953)
- "Strange Departure" (1953)
- "Pictures in the Fire" (1953)
- "The Flying Flash" (1953)
- "The Temple Vase" (1953)
- "The Sealed Package" (1953)
- "The Helmet and the Spear" (1954)
- "The Chinese Dragon" (1954)
- "The Five Pines Problem" (1954)
- "Line of Fire" (1954)
- "When the Bough Breaks" (1954)
- "Storm Over the Fells" (1954)
- "The Blue Envelopes" (1954)
- "Strange Departure" (1955)
- "Mr Nobody's House" (1955)
- "Minstrels' Gallery" (1956)
- "The Witches Elbow" (1956)
- "The Riddle of the Rocks" (1956)
- "The Rainbow Boy" (1956)
- "The Secret of Pengrylh-Myr" (1957)
- "The Passage Under the Lake" (1957)
- "The Forest Cat" (1958)
- "The Ruttledge Inheritance" (1958)
- "Missile Mark Ten" (1958)
- "The Legend of Marcus Mere" (1958)
- "A Case of Forgeries" (1958)
- "Oak Before Ash" (1958)
- "The Langdon Legacy" (1959)
- "No Picnic" (1959)
- "The Nelson Letter" (1959)
- "W. Pays the Price" (1959)
- "The Case of the Missing Pianist" (1959)
- "Alexander Keepeth Watch" (1959)
- "Forced Landing" (1960)
- "Exit Edward Eastman" (1960)
- "A Case of Coins" (1960)
- "Red Light Warning" (1960)
- "Hobbilight Hall" (1960)
- "The Voice in the Chimney" (1960)
- "In Search of Ethel Gray" (1960)
- "Four Pink Pearls" (1960)
- "The Case of the Missing Secretary" (1960)
- "A Clue to My Secret" (1960)
- "House For Sale" (100th adventure) (1961)
- "The Orchid-House Mystery" (1961)
- "Troubled Waters" (1961)
- "The Singing-bird Clock" (1961)
- "The Roman Emperor" (1961)
- "The Smuggler's Way" (1961)
- "The Golden Tapestry" (1961)
- "The Night Avengers" (1962)
- "The Music Mystery" (1962)
- "The Peakdown Hold-Up" (1962)
- "A Present from the Tsar" (1962)
- "Five Black Diamonds" (1962)
- "Beware of the Dog" (1962)
- "Storm In The Valley" (1962)
- "Black Magic" (1964)
- "The Favourite came Fifth" (1964)
- "Hit and Run" (1964)
- "The Bones of a Dinosaur" (1964)
- "Time Will Tell" (1964)
- "A Ride in the Dark" (1964)
- "The Venetian Bowl" (1964)
- "The Screaming Tower" (1964)
- "A Pair of Golden Pheasants" (1964)
- "The Case of the Missing Tutor" (1965)
- "The Monster of Sculton Mere" (1965)
- "The Radcliffes of Wildwinds Hall" (1965)

== Books ==
Following the success of the broadcasts, Wilson published several books of Norman and Henry Bones adventures.
