= 1963 in British television =

This is a list of British television related events from 1963.

== Events ==
=== January ===
- 7 January – Granada Television first broadcasts World in Action, its influential investigative current affairs series which will run for 57 years.
- 13 January – The play Madhouse on Castle Street is broadcast in the BBC Sunday-Night Play strand. Little-known young American folk music singer Bob Dylan had originally been cast as the lead but proved unsatisfactory as an actor and the play has been restructured to give him a singing role; he gives one of the earliest public performances of "Blowin' in the Wind" over the credits.
- 20 January – ITV launches a new Sunday daytime educational strand called The Sunday Session.

=== February ===
- 18 February – The Strabane transmitter opens, bringing coverage to the west of Northern Ireland for the first time.

=== March ===
- 23 March – The 8th Eurovision Song Contest is held at the BBC Television Centre in London. Denmark wins the contest with the song "Dansevise", performed by Grethe and Jørgen Ingmann. The British entrant is Ronnie Carroll for the second consecutive year, singing "Say Wonderful Things", which places him fourth, also for the second consecutive year.

=== May ===
- 18 May – Athol Fugard's anti-apartheid play Blood Knot is recorded for ATV's Armchair Theatre series but never broadcast.

=== July ===
- 3 July – ITV Northern debuts the Hanna Barbara family cartoon seriesThe Jetsons ahead of other ITV regions.
- 8 July – The English comedy sketch Dinner for One with Freddie Frinton, having been shown live on Peter Frankenfeld's show GutenAbend in 1962, is recorded in English by Norddeutscher Rundfunk before an audience at the Theater am Besenbinderhof, Hamburg, West Germany. Regularly repeated on New Year's Eve in Germany and in other European countries, it is not seen in its entirety on British television until 2018.
- 20 July – BBC Grandstand features live coverage from the first day of the 3rd women's Test between England and Australia at The Oval. This is the earliest known live television broadcast of women's Test cricket.

=== August ===
- 9 August – Ready Steady Go! premieres on ITV.

=== September ===
- 30 September – BBC TV begins using a globe as their symbol. They will continue to use it in varying forms until 2002.

=== November ===
- 22 November – This evening's television reports the assassination of John F. Kennedy. However, the BBC's decision to screen the scheduled episodes of sitcom Here's Harry (starring Harry Worth) and medical drama Dr. Finlay's Casebook leads to the broadcaster receiving several thousand complaints. Called from a party to appear on a special edition of Associated-Rediffusion's This Week, Deputy Leader of the Labour Party George Brown has a drunken brawl with US actor Eli Wallach in the green room and when he goes on air millions of viewers see him interpret a fair question as an accusation of his having overstated his closeness to Kennedy, then give a morose and slurred tribute from which it is apparent he is intoxicated; he has to issue a public apology.
- 23 November
  - William Hartnell stars as the First Doctor in the very first episode of science fiction series Doctor Who. (first of the four-part serial An Unearthly Child). So many people complain of having missed it, because of the disruption to schedules caused by the assassination of John F. Kennedy, that the following Saturday, the first episode is repeated before the broadcast of the second one. Doctor Who runs until 1989, with a television film shown in 1996, and is revived in 2005.
  - That Was the Week That Was broadcasts a serious Kennedy tribute episode.

=== December ===
- 21 December – First episode of the seven-part serial The Daleks broadcast in the Doctor Who series, introducing the titular aliens (revealed fully in the following week's episode).
- 28 December – The satirical BBC show That Was the Week That Was (TW3) airs for the last time, with a end-of-the-year special.

=== Undated ===
- Admags, a form of infomercial, are prohibited on television by Parliament.
- Schweppes launches a campaign for their mineral waters using the slogan (voiced by William Franklyn) "Schhh... You know who."
- After Eight mints are promoted with a dinner party advertisement.

== Debuts ==
=== BBC Television Service/BBC TV ===
- 5 January – The Chem. Lab. Mystery (1963)
- 18 January – Mr Justice Duncannon (1963)
- 21 February – Moonstrike (1963)
- 24 February – The Desperate People (1963)
- 8 March – The Birth of a Private Man (1963)
- 31 March – The Sunday Play (1963)
- 7 April – Jane Eyre (1963)
- 3 May – The Spread of the Eagle (1963)
- 18 May – The Stanley Baxter Show (1963–1971)
- 19 May – Epitaph for a Spy (1963)
- 3 June – Hornblower (1963)
- 20 June – Maupassant (1963)
- 10 July – Taxi! (1963–1964)
- 13 July – The Dick Emery Show (1963–1981)
- 16 August – Marriage Lines (1963–1966)
- 28 August – Citizen 63 (1963)
- 31 August – Deputy Dawg (1960–1964)
- 1 September – No Cloak – No Dagger (1963)
- 3 September – Swallows and Amazons (1963)
- 22 September – First Night (1963–1964)
- 30 September – Spotlight South-West (1963–present)
- 5 October – The Telegoons (1963–1964)
- 6 October – Dig This Rhubarb (1963–1964)
- 9 October – Festival (1963–1964)
- 13 October – Kidnapped (1963)
- 1 November – Teletale (1963–1964)
- 23 November – Doctor Who (1963–1989, 1996, 2005–present)
- 28 November – Bold as Brass (1963–1964)
- 26 December – Laughter from the Whitehall (1963–1965)
- 28 December – Meet the Wife (1963–1966)
- Unknown – Bleep and Booster (1963–1977)

=== ITV ===
- 3 January – Hancock (1963)
- 4 January – Badger's Bend (1963–1964)
- 5 January –
  - Dimensions of Fear (1963)
  - Once Aboard the Lugger (1963)
- 6 January – Best of Friends (1963)
- 7 January – World in Action (1963–2000)
- 27 January – The Twilight Zone (1959–1964; 1985–1989)
- 2 February – 24-Hour Call (1963)
- 1 February – The Beverly Hillbillies (1962–1971)
- 4 February – The Plane Makers (1963–1965)
- 30 March –
  - Jezebel ex UK (1963)
  - The Human Jungle (1963–1964)
- 2 April – Crane (1963–1965)
- 7 April – Space Patrol (1963–1968)
- 7 May – Sierra Nine (1963)
- 29 May – The Des O'Connor Show (1963–1973)
- 31 May –
  - Stars and Garters (1963–1966)
  - The Victorians (1963)
- 3 June – Love Story (1963–1974)
- 9 June – Sergeant Cork (1963–1968)
- 3 July – The Jetsons (1962–1963, 1985–1987)
- 26 July – Bud (1963)
- 6 August – Smugglers' Cove (1963)
- 8 August – A Little Big Business (1963–1965)
- 9 August – Ready Steady Go! (1963–1966)
- 20 September – Burke's Law (1963–1966)
- 25 September – Our Man at St. Mark's (1963–1966)
- 28 September – The Sentimental Agent (1963)
- 1 October – Five O'Clock Club (1963–1966)
- 2 October – Espionage (1963–1964)
- 1 November – Friday Night (1963)
- 9 November – Emerald Soup (1963)
- 10 November – That's My Boy (1963)

== Continuing television shows ==
=== 1920s ===
- BBC Wimbledon (1927–1939, 1946–2019, 2021–2024)

=== 1930s ===
- Trooping the Colour (1937–1939, 1946–2019, 2023–present)
- The Boat Race (1938–1939, 1946–2019, 2021–present)
- BBC Cricket (1939, 1946–1999, 2020–2024)

=== 1940s ===
- The Ed Sullivan Show (1948–1971)
- Come Dancing (1949–1998)

=== 1950s ===
- Andy Pandy (1950–1970, 2002–2005)
- Watch with Mother (1952–1975)
- Rag, Tag and Bobtail (1953–1965)
- The Good Old Days (1953–1983)
- Panorama (1953–present)
- Picture Book (1955–1965)
- Sunday Night at the London Palladium (1955–1967, 1973–1974)
- Take Your Pick! (1955–1968, 1992–1998)
- Double Your Money (1955–1968)
- Dixon of Dock Green (1955–1976)
- Crackerjack (1955–1970, 1972–1984, 2020–2021)
- ITV Wimbledon (1956–1968)
- Opportunity Knocks (1956–1978, 1987–1990)
- This Week (1956–1978, 1986–1992)
- Armchair Theatre (1956–1974)
- What the Papers Say (1956–2008)
- Grandstand (1958–2007)
- Noggin the Nog (1959–1965, 1970, 1979–1982)

=== 1960s ===
- Sykes and A... (1960–1965)
- The Flintstones (1960–1966)
- Coronation Street (1960–present)
- Ghost Squad (1961–1964)
- The Avengers (1961–1969)
- Points of View (1961–present)
- Songs of Praise (1961–present)
- Compact (1962–1965)
- Steptoe and Son (1962–1965, 1970–1974)
- Hugh and I (1962–1967)
- The Saint (1962–1969)
- Z-Cars (1962–1978)
- Animal Magic (1962–1983)

== Ending this year ==
- Zoo Quest (1954–1963)
- That Was The Week That Was (1962–1963)

== Births ==
- 16 January – James May, motoring journalist and television show host
- 19 January – Martin Bashir, television journalist
- 22 January – Nicola Duffett, actress
- 27 January – Mark Moraghan, actor and singer
- 10 February – Philip Glenister, actor
- 16 March – Jerome Flynn, British actor
- 20 March – David Thewlis, English actor
- 16 April – Nick Berry, actor and singer
- 22 April – Sean Lock comedian and actor (died 2021)
- 27 April – Russell T Davies, Welsh-born screenwriter
- 11 May – Natasha Richardson, actress (died 2009)
- 20 May – Jenny Funnell, radio and television actress
- 22 May – David Schneider, actor
- 6 June – Jason Isaacs, actor
- 2 July – Mark Kermode, British film critic
- 3 July – Jo Wheeler, weather forecaster
- 7 August – Julia Ford, English actress
- 31 August – Todd Carty, actor and director
- 11 September – Colin Wells, actor
- 26 September
  - Lysette Anthony, English actress
  - Jo Caulfield, actress, writer and comedian
- 5 October
  - Ruth Goodman, social historian and television presenter
  - Nick Robinson, broadcast journalist, BBC News political editor
- 3 November – Ian Wright, footballer and radio and television presenter
- 10 November – Hugh Bonneville, actor
- 28 November – Armando Iannucci, Scottish comedian, satirist and producer
- 24 December – Caroline Aherne, comic actress/writer (died 2016)
- Unknown – Judy Flynn, actress (Ben and Holly's Little Kingdom)

== Deaths ==
- 30 January – Cecil McGivern, BBC Television Controller (born 1907)

== See also ==
- 1963 in British music
- 1963 in British radio
- 1963 in the United Kingdom
- List of British films of 1963
