= Dumb Dora Discovers Tobacco =

1946 British film by Charles Hawtrey

- Directed by: Charles Hawtrey
- Written by: Henry King; Victor Katona; Bill Duncalf
- Starring: Ronald Waldman; Henry Kendall; Flora Robson
- Cinematography: Jan Sikorsky
- Production companies: Hurley Productions; Grand National Film Productions
- Release date: 1946
- Running time: 41 minutes
- Country: United Kingdom
- Language: English

Dumb Dora Discovers Tobacco (also known as Fag End) is a 1946 British second feature ('B') short film directed by Charles Hawtrey and starring Ronald Waldman, Henry Kendall and Flora Robson. It was written by Henry King, Victor Katona and Bill Duncalf.

The film is notable for being one of only two films directed by Hawtrey. The other is What Do We Do Now? (1945), which is believed lost.

== Plot ==
Young hare-brained newspaper journalist "Dumb Dora" is assigned to write an article about the history of tobacco. Using excerpts from films and dramatised scenes, the film considers origins of smoking and modern tobacco production methods.

== Cast ==
- Ronald Waldman as commentator (voice)
- Henry Kendall as Mackenzie
- Flora Robson
- Claud Allister as Sir Percival
- Gene Gerrard as smoking tutor
- Pamela Stirling as Dora
- Orlando Martins
- Hugh Dempster as Peter Pottlebury
- Wally Patch as heckler
- Philip King as Justice Hare

== Reception ==
The Monthly Film Bulletin wrote: "Dumb Dora, a youthful and scatterbrain journalist, is given the job of writing an article on the history of tobacco for her paper. While she does the research work from books reclining on a sofa the film shows, amongst other things, the instruction of eager pupils in the new art by a special tutor in Raleigh's days, the changing attitude of women towards smoking ever since those days and an interesting but brief glimpse of the manufacture by machine and by hand of cigars and cigarettes. This film on a useful topic is ruined by its light-hearted vein and the ridiculous behaviour of the childish journalist."

Kine Weekly wrote: "Its culminating tour of a modern tobacco factory is interesting, but the re-enacted period sequences and snippets borrowed from old costume pieces are roughly strung together and accompanied by singularly unfunny commentary. Indifferent editing and mistimed humour seriously devalue value promising 'interest entertainment'. ... Pamela Stirling grossly overacts as Dora, and Henry Kendall fails to make the best of a bad job as commentator."

Chibnall and McFarlane wrote in The British 'B' Film that the film is "a hotchpotch of sketches and clips from old films".

== Preservation status ==
The British Film Institute states that a 35mm negative of the film is held in its collection.
