= Charles Hawtrey (actor, born 1914) =

English comic actor and theatre director (1914–1988)

- Hawtrey in Carry On at Your Convenience (1971)
- Born: George Frederick Joffre Hartree; 30 November 1914; Hounslow, Middlesex, England
- Died: 27 October 1988 (aged 73); Deal, Kent, England
- Education: Italia Conti Academy of Theatre Arts
- Occupations: Actor; comedian; singer; pianist; theatre director
- Years active: 1922–1987

George Frederick Joffre Hartree (30 November 1914 – 27 October 1988), known professionally as Charles Hawtrey, was an English actor, comedian, singer, pianist and theatre director.

He began at an early age as a boy soprano, in which role he made several records, before moving on to radio. His later career encompassed the theatre (as both actor and director), the cinema (where he regularly appeared supporting Will Hay in the 1930s and 1940s in films such as The Ghost of St. Michael's), through the Carry On films, and television.

== Life and career ==
=== Early life ===
Hawtrey was born in Hounslow, Middlesex, England, in 1914, to William John Hartree (1885–1952) and his wife Alice (née Crow) (1880–1965), of 217 Cromwell Road, as George Frederick Joffre Hartree. He took his stage name from the theatrical knight Sir Charles Hawtrey, and encouraged the suggestion that he was Hawtrey's son (though his father was actually a London car mechanic).

Following study at the Italia Conti Academy of Theatre Arts in London, he embarked on a career in the theatre as both actor and director.

=== 1920s and 1930s ===
Hawtrey made his first appearance on the stage in Boscombe, a suburb of Bournemouth, as early as 1925. At the age of 11 he played a 'street Arab' in Frederick Bowyer's fairy play The Windmill Man.

His London stage debut followed a couple of years later when, aged 13, he appeared in another 'fairy extravaganza', this time at the Scala Theatre, singing the role of the White Cat and Bootblack in the juvenile opera Bluebell in Fairyland. The music for this popular show had been written by Walter Slaughter in 1901, with a book by Seymour Hicks that provided part of the inspiration for J. M. Barrie's Peter Pan.

In Peter Pan itself, at the London Palladium in 1931, Hawtrey played the First Twin, with leading parts taken by Jean Forbes-Robertson and George Curzon. This played in several regional theatres, including His Majesty's Theatre in Aberdeen. In 1936 Hawtrey acted in a revival of the play, this time taking the larger role of Slightly alongside the husband-and-wife partnership of Elsa Lanchester and Charles Laughton, playing Peter and Hook. A review in The Daily Telegraph commended Hawtrey for having "a comedy sense not unworthy of his famous name".

Hawtrey played Jerry Morton in Bats in the Belfry, a farce written by Diana Morgan and Robert MacDermott, which opened at the Ambassadors Theatre, Shaftesbury Avenue, on 11 March 1937. The cast included Dame Lilian Braithwaite and Henry Kendall, as well as Vivien Leigh as Jerry's sister Jessica. The play ran for 178 performances at the Ambassadors Theatre before moving to the Golders Green Hippodrome on 16 August 1937.

Hawtrey acted in films from an early age, first appearing while still a child, and as an adult his youthful appearance and wit made him a foil to Will Hay's blundering old fool in the comedy films Good Morning, Boys (1937) and Where's That Fire? (1939). In all he appeared in more than 70 films including, from this period, Alfred Hitchcock's Sabotage (1936).

Hawtrey had another stage success in 1939, when he was cast in the role of Gremio in Tyrone Guthrie's production of The Taming of the Shrew at the Old Vic, in which Roger Livesey starred as Petruchio and his wife, Ursula Jeans, as Katherine.

Hawtrey was also an accomplished musician. He recorded as a boy soprano and was billed as 'The Angel-Voiced Choirboy' even at the age of 15. In 1930 he recorded several duets with the girl soprano Evelyn Griffiths (aged 11) for the Regal label. He was a semi-professional pianist for the armed forces during the Second World War.

=== 1940s ===
Hawtrey continued in music revue, starring in Eric Maschwitz's New Faces (1940) at the Comedy Theatre in London, and was praised for his "chic and finished study of an alluring woman spy". New Faces included the premiere of the song "A Nightingale Sang in Berkeley Square", which quickly became a wartime favourite.

During and after the Second World War, Hawtrey also appeared in the West End in such shows as Scoop, Old Chelsea, Merrie England, Frou-Frou and Husbands Don't Count. Hawtrey also directed 19 plays, including Dumb Dora Discovers Tobacco at the Q Theatre in Richmond and, in 1945, Oflag 3, a war drama co-written with Douglas Bader.

By the 1940s, Hawtrey was appearing on radio during Children's Hour in the series Norman and Henry Bones, the Boy Detectives (first broadcast in 1943) alongside the actress Patricia Hayes. Later, he provided the voice of snooty Hubert Lane, the nemesis of William in the series Just William. His catchphrase was "How's yer mother off for dripping?"

Hawtrey's film career continued, but The Ghost of St. Michael's (1941) and The Goose Steps Out (1942) were his last films with Will Hay. After the latter film he asked Hay to give him bigger roles, but Hay refused.

Hawtrey directed two films: What Do We Do Now? (1946), believed lost, a musical mystery written by the English author George Cooper and starring George Moon; and Dumb Dora Discovers Tobacco (1946), featuring Flora Robson.

In 1948, Hawtrey appeared at the Windmill Theatre, Soho, in comedy sketches presented as part of Revudeville. In the same year, he was incorrectly credited as 'Major Markham' in The Story of Shirley Yorke, (but see 'Filmography', and Edit Note), using two pseudonyms.

In 1949 he appeared as the bar-hand/piano player in the Ealing comedy Passport to Pimlico.

=== 1950s ===
In 1956, Hawtrey appeared alongside his future Carry On co-star Hattie Jacques in the comedian Digby Wolfe's ATV series Wolfe at the Door, a 12-week sketch show. Not screened in London, it ran in the Midlands from 18 June to 10 September. In this series Wolfe explored the comic situations that could be found by passing through doorways, into a theatrical dressing room, for example. The programmes were written by Tony Hawes and Richard Waring.

In the same year Hawtrey made a brief appearance in Tess and Tim (BBC) under the Saturday Comedy Hour banner. This short-run series starred the music hall comedians Tessie O'Shea and Jimmy Wheeler. In 1957, Hawtrey appeared in a one-off episode of Laughter in Store (BBC), this time working with Charlie Drake and Irene Handl.

Hawtrey's television career gained a major boost with The Army Game, in which he played the part of Private 'Professor' Hatchett. Loosely based on the film Private's Progress (1956), the series followed the fortunes of a mixed bag of army National Service conscripts in residence at Hut 29 of the Surplus Ordnance Depot at Nether Hopping in remote Staffordshire. I Only Arsked! (1958) was a feature film spin-off. Hawtrey left the series in 1958.

=== 1960s ===
In Our House (1960–1962) Hawtrey played a council official, Simon Willow. The series was created by Norman Hudis, the screenwriter for the first six Carry On films. Hattie Jacques and Joan Sims also starred. The series initially ran for 13 episodes from September to December 1960, returning the following year with Bernard Bresslaw and Hylda Baker added to the cast. Of the 39 episodes transmitted, only three survive.

Best of Friends (ITV, 1963) had essentially the same writers and production team as Our House. Hawtrey again acted alongside Hylda Baker but this time playing the role of Charles, a clerk in an insurance office, next door to a café run by Baker. She accompanied him on insurance assignments and protected him when he was feeling put upon by his Uncle Sidney, who wished to but could not, dismiss his nephew. The series ran to thirteen episodes (all lost) and was the last television series in which Hawtrey had a regular role.

By this time Hawtrey had become a regular in the Carry On films series. He was in the first, Carry On Sergeant (1958), and more than twenty others. His characters ranged from the wimpish through the effete to the effeminate and would always, regardless of the historical setting, be seen wearing Hawtrey's signature round glasses. In her autobiography, Barbara Windsor wrote about Hawtrey's alcoholism and his outrageous flirting with the footballer George Best. While filming Carry On Spying (1964), in which they played secret agents, Windsor thought that Hawtrey had fainted with fright over a dramatic scene on a conveyor belt. In fact, he had passed out because he was drunk. When he came on set with a crate of R. White's lemonade everyone knew that he had been on another binge. He smoked Woodbines and played cards between takes with Sid James and other members of the cast. In 1965, Hawtrey's mother Alice died; Hawtrey was grief-stricken and started drinking more. Apparently, Hawtrey could often be heard talking to his mother in his dressing room, even though she had died.

Gerald Thomas, the director of the Carry On films, explained in 1966 that "In the beginning Charles's shock entrance was an accident, but realising the potential I set out deliberately to shock and now his first appearance is carefully planned.... Apart from the comedy value of the unlikely role he plays, I'm careful to arrange the right timing for his actual appearance, so that the two factors combined surprise the audience into instant risibility." In the mid-1960s, Hawtrey performed in the British regional tour of the stage musical A Funny Thing Happened on the Way to the Forum, which also included his Carry On co-star Kenneth Connor.

=== Later life and career ===
Although the Carry On films made a handsome return for their producer, Peter Rogers, the cast were not well remunerated, commonly receiving a standard fee of £5,000 per film. Hawtrey used public transport to get to and from work, and was once given a lift to Pinewood Studios by Laurence Olivier. Requested to embrace Barbara Windsor at a meeting with the press, Hawtrey hurriedly left the room, requesting a man in her place.

Hawtrey moved in 1968 to Deal, in Kent, reputedly because of the sailors at the local naval base. He lived at 117 Middle Street, Deal, where he remained until his death. There is a small commemorative blue plaque on the front exterior wall of this property to identify his former residence. Hawtrey cut an eccentric figure in the small town, becoming well known for promenading along the seafront in extravagant attire, waving cheerfully to the fishermen and for frequenting establishments patronised by students of the Royal Marines School of Music.

In 1970, he appeared with Sid James in the South African film Stop Exchange. He made an appearance in Grasshopper Island (ITV 1971), a children's programme, alongside Patricia Hayes, Julian Orchard, Tim Brooke-Taylor and Frank Muir. Filmed in Wales and Corsica, this adventure series featured three small brothers nicknamed Toughy, Smarty and Mouse, who run away to find an uninhabited island.

Hawtrey's last film was Carry On Abroad (1972), after which he was dropped from the series. Hoping to gain higher billing, Hawtrey withdrew from a television programme, Carry On Christmas, in which he was scheduled to appear, giving just a few days' notice. Peter Rogers, the producer of the Carry On films and shows, said "He became rather difficult and impossible to deal with because he was drinking a lot. We used to feed him black coffee before he would go on. It really became clear that we were wasting time". Hawtrey's alcohol consumption had noticeably increased since Carry On Cowboy (1965), which was released in the year his mother died.

Without steady film work, Hawtrey performed in pantomime and summer seasons in the regions, playing heavily on his Carry On persona in such shows as Carry On Holiday Show-time and Snow White at the Gaiety Theatre, Rhyl (summer 1970), Stop it Nurse at the Pavilion Theatre, Torquay (1972), and Snow White and the Seven Dwarfs again at the Theatre Royal, Nottingham (April 1974). His last pantomime season was Christmas 1979.

Hawtrey also played parts in a series of radio plays about a criminal gang written by Wally K. Daly for the BBC, alongside Peter Jones, Lockwood West and Bernard Bresslaw. These were Burglar's Bargains (1979), A Right Royal Rip-off (1982) and The Bigger They Are (1985).

=== Personal life ===
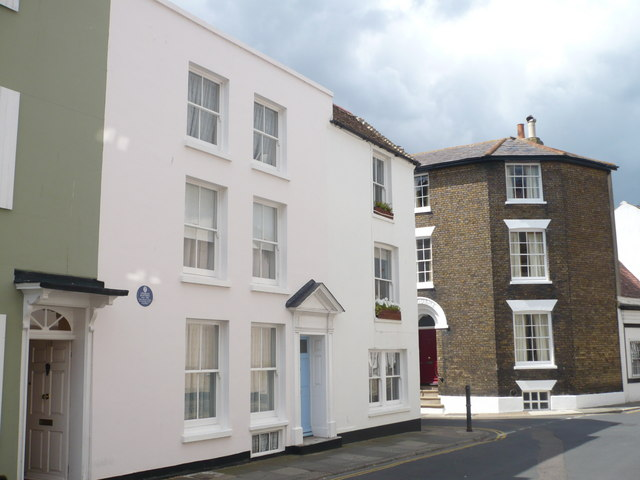
Hawtrey's residence in Deal, Kent where the 1984 fire occurred

Little is known about Hawtrey's early years or later private life which he guarded carefully. His outrageous drunken promiscuity did not attract sympathy, nor did his general peevish demeanour and increasing eccentricity earn him many close friends; Hawtrey would often swear at and rip up the paper of fans who asked for an autograph. Kenneth Williams recounted a visit to Hawtrey's home in Deal where he had hoarded old brass bedsteads in the belief that "one day he would make a great deal of money from them", and how Hawtrey would take home all leftover sandwiches from buffets held for the Carry On team. Williams commented on Hawtrey's acceptance of his homosexuality that "He can sit in a bar and pick up sailors and have a wonderful time. I couldn't do it."

Hawtrey spent most of his life living with his mother, who suffered Alzheimer's disease in later years; he would often bring her onto the set of his current film and then lock her in his dressing room when he was required for a scene. During a break in the filming of Carry On Teacher, Joan Sims cried out to Hawtrey that his mother's handbag had caught fire after her cigarette ash fell into it, to which an unfazed Hawtrey poured a cup of tea into the bag to extinguish the flames, snapped it shut and continued his conversation.

Hawtrey attracted media attention after his house caught fire on 5 August 1984, after he had gone to bed and left a cigarette burning on a sofa. Newspaper photographs from the time show a fireman leading an ill-looking, emotional, partially clothed and toupeeless Hawtrey to safety. Hawtrey told the press that "The smell of smoke woke me up and there were flames coming up the stairway. I've lost a lot of valuable antiques and sentimental keepsakes but I am all right. It was all very frightening".

=== Death ===
Hawtrey suffered a heart attack in June 1981, after which his health deteriorated. In late September 1988 Hawtrey was admitted to the Buckland Hospital in Dover, where it was discovered he suffered from peripheral artery disease, a condition brought on by a lifetime of heavy smoking. Hawtrey was told that to save his life, his legs would have to be amputated. He refused to have the operation, allegedly saying that he preferred 'to die with his boots on' and died at 3:30 am on 27 October 1988, at Windthorpe Lodge Nursing Home in Walmer, near Deal. It was claimed that on his deathbed he threw a vase at his nurse who asked for an autograph. On 2 November 1988, he was cremated and his ashes were scattered in Mortlake Crematorium, close to Chiswick in London. Nine mourners attended; no friends or family were there.

== Legacy ==
Hawtrey was portrayed by Hugh Walters in the television film Cor, Blimey! (2000). This was adapted by Terry Johnson from his stage play Cleo, Camping, Emmanuelle and Dick (1998); the original play did not feature Hawtrey as a character. In the BBC Four television play Kenneth Williams: Fantabulosa! (2006), Hawtrey was played by David Charles.

He is also the subject of a one-man biographical stage play, Oh, Hello!, by Dave Ainsworth, premiered in 2001 at The Torch Theatre, which was revived in 2014/2015 for the actor's centenary, with Jamie Rees in the role.

He has been the subject of two biographies: Charles Hawtrey 1914–1988: The Man Who Was Private Widdle (2002) by Roger Lewis and Whatshisname: The Life and Death of Charles Hawtrey (2010) by the broadcaster Wes Butters. BBC Radio 4 broadcast Butters' documentary, Charles Hawtrey: That Funny Fella with the Glasses, in April 2010.

Reference is made to Hawtrey by John Lennon (seemingly nonsensically) just before the song "Two of Us" on the Beatles' Let It Be album. Lennon says: "I Dig a Pygmy, by Charles Hawtrey and The Deaf-Aids. Phase one, in which Doris gets her oats."

The sleeve of the Smiths' compilation album The Very Best of The Smiths features Hawtrey.

== Filmography (as actor) ==
- Tell Your Children (1922) as minor role (uncredited)
- This Freedom (1923) (uncredited)
- Marry Me (1932) as Billy Hart
- The Melody-Maker (1933) as Torn
- Mayfair Girl (1933)
- Smithy (1933)
- High Finance (1933)
- As Good as New (1933)
- Trouble in Store (1934)
- Hyde Park (1934) as Secondary Supporting Role (uncredited)
- Little Stranger (1934)
- Murder at Monte Carlo (1935)
- Boys Will Be Boys (1935)
- Windfall (1935) (minor role, uncredited)
- Man of the Moment (1935) as Tom (uncredited)
- Get Off My Foot (1935)
- Well Done, Henry (1936) as Rupert McNab
- Cheer Up (1936) as dancing Boy Scout (uncredited)
- The Brown Wallet (1936) (bit part, uncredited)
- Sabotage (1936) as studious youth at the aquarium (uncredited)
- Good Morning, Boys (1937) as Septimus
- Melody and Romance (1937) reciting Shakespeare at audition (uncredited)
- Where's That Fire? (1940) as Woodley
- Jailbirds (1940) as Nick
- The Ghost of St. Michael's (1941) as Percy Thorne
- The Goose Steps Out (1942) as Max
- Let the People Sing (1942) as Young Orton
- Much Too Shy (1942) as student of Modern Art (uncredited)
- Bell-Bottom George (1943) as BBC man (uncredited)
- A Canterbury Tale (1944) as Thomas Duckett
- Meet Me at Dawn (1947) as reporter at the fair (uncredited)
- The End of the River (1947) as Raphael
- The Story of Shirley Yorke (1948) (Major Markham, a.k.a. 'Sibelius' / 'Mendelssohn' when playing the piano)
- Passport to Pimlico (1949) as Bert Fitch
- The Lost People (1949) as prisoner (uncredited)
- Dark Secret (1949) as Arthur Figson
- Room to Let (1950) as Mike Atkinson
- Smart Alec (1951) as Farr
- The Galloping Major (1951) as Lew Rimmel
- Hammer the Toff (1952) as cashier (uncredited)
- Brandy for the Parson (1952) as George Crumb
- You're Only Young Twice (1952) as Adolphus Hayman
- Five Days (1954) as Bill (uncredited)
- To Dorothy a Son (1954) as waiter at pub (uncredited)
- As Long as They're Happy (1955) as Teddyboy
- Timeslip (a.k.a.The Atomic Man; 1955) as office-boy (uncredited)
- Simon and Laura (1955) as railway porter
- Man of the Moment (1955) as play director (uncredited)
- Jumping for Joy (1956) as punter at bar (uncredited)
- Who Done It? (1956) as disc jockey
- The March Hare (1956) as Fisher
- Carry On Sergeant (1958) as Peter Golightly
- I Only Arsked! (1958) as Pvt. 'Professor' Hatchett
- Carry On Nurse (1959) as Humphrey Hinton
- Carry On Teacher (1959) as Michael Bean
- Please Turn Over (1959) as Jeweller
- Inn for Trouble (1960) as Silas Withering
- Carry On Constable (1960) as PC Timothy Gorse
- Carry On Regardless (1961) as Gabriel Dimple
- Dentist on the Job (1961) as Mr. Roper
- What a Whopper (1961) as Arnold
- Carry On Cabby (1963) as Terry 'Pintpot' Tankard
- Carry On Jack (1963) as Walter Sweetly
- Carry On Spying (1964) as Charlie Bind
- Carry On Cleo (1964) as Seneca
- Carry On Cowboy (1965) as Chief Big Heap
- Carry On Screaming! (1966) as Dan Dann
- Carry On Don't Lose Your Head (1966) as Duc de Pommfrit
- The Terrornauts (1967) as Joshua Yellowlees
- Carry On Follow That Camel (1967) as Captain Le Pice
- Carry On Doctor (1967) as Mr. Barron
- Carry On Up the Khyber (1968) as Pte. James Widdle
- Carry On Camping (1969) as Charlie Muggins
- Carry On Again Doctor (1969) as Doctor Ernest Stoppidge
- Zeta One (1969) as Swyne
- Carry On Up the Jungle (1970) as Tonka the Great / Walter Bagley
- Stop Exchange (1970) as The Butler
- Carry On Loving (1970) as James Bedsop
- Carry On Henry (1971) as Sir Roger de Lodgerley
- Carry On at Your Convenience (1971) as Charles Coote
- Carry On Matron (1972) as Dr. Francis A. Goode
- Carry On Abroad (1972) as Eustace Tuttle (final film appearance)

== Filmography (as director) ==
- What Do We Do Now? (1946)
- Dumb Dora Discovers Tobacco (1946)

== Television appearances ==
- Tess and Tim, BBC (1956)
- Wolfe at the Door, ATV (1956)
- Laughter in Store, BBC (1957)
- The Army Game, Granada (1957–1958) as Private 'Professor' Hatchett
- Our House, ABC (1960) as Simon Willow
- Best of Friends, ABC (1963) as Charles
- Ghosts of Christmas, a.k.a. Carry On Christmas, Thames (1969) as Spirit of Christmas Past / Angel / Convent Girl
- Carry On Long John, a.k.a. Carry On Again Christmas, a.k.a. I'm Worried About Jim Hawkins, Thames (1970) as Bell Ringer
- Grasshopper Island, ITV (1971) as The Elderly Boy
- The Princess and the Pea (short) (1979) as Court Jester
- The Plank, Thames (1979) as Co-Driver
- Movie Memories, Series 1 Episode 2, Anglia (1981) as self, interviewed by Roy Hudd
- Runaround, Halloween Special, Southern Television (1981) as Count Dracula
- Super Gran, "Super Gran and the State Visit", Tyne Tees (1987) as Clarence, Duke of Claridge (final television appearance)

== Theatrical appearances ==
- The Windmill Man, Boscombe Hippodrome (and tour) (1925) as Street Arab
- Bluebell in Fairyland, Scala Theatre, London (1927) as White Cat and Bootblack
- Peter Pan, The London Palladium (1931) as First Twin
- Peter Pan, The London Palladium (1936) as Slightly
- Members Only, Gate Studio Theatre, London (1936)
- Bats in the Belfry, Ambassadors Theatre, London (11 March – 14 August 1937) as Jerry Morton
- Shakespeare Birthday Festival, Old Vic, London (1938–1939)
- The Taming of the Shrew, Old Vic, London (1938–1939)
- New Faces (revue), Apollo Theatre (Shaftesbury Avenue), London (1940)
- The New Ambassadors Revue, Ambassadors Theatre, London (18 July – 14 September 1941)
- Scoop!, The Vaudeville Theatre, London (1942)
- Old Chelsea, Palace Theatre, Manchester (1943)
- Merrie England, Winter Garden Theatre, London (1944)
- Variety with Will Hay, Victoria Palace Theatre, London (1945)
- Revudeville, Windmill Theatre, London (1948)
- Frou-Frou, The New Lindsay Theatre, London (1951)
- Husbands Don't Count, Winter Garden Theatre, London (1 October – 29 November 1952) as Mouton
- A Funny Thing Happened on the Way to the Forum, Bristol Hippodrome, Pavilion Theatre, Bournemouth, and other locations (4 October – 4 December 1965) as Hysterium
- The Mating Game, Yvonne Arnaud Theatre, Guildford (24 June – 5 July 1969) as Arthur
- Stop It Nurse, Pavilion Theatre, Torquay (2 June – 30 September 1972) as Dr B C Dimple
- No Sex Please We're British, Theatre Royal, Margate (1974)
- Snow White and the Seven Dwarfs, Bristol Hippodrome (1976–1977)

== Radio appearances ==
This list is partially compiled from the BBC Radio Archive.

- Vaudeville, BBC Regional Programme London (1930)
- Will Shakespeare, BBC Regional Programme London (1931) as A Boy
- Vaudeville, "The Writ", BBC Regional Programme London (1932) as Hotchkiss
- An Ideal Husband, BBC National Programme Daventry (1932)
- I Sketch Your World, BBC Regional Programme London (1933)
- The Watched Pot, BBC Regional Programme London (1933) as William, a page-boy at Briony
- Charing Cross Road, BBC Regional Programme Northern (1934)
- Frederica, BBC Regional Programme Daventry (1934) as Johann Heinrich Jung-Stilling
- Postman's Knock, BBC Regional Programme London (1934)
- Big Business, BBC Regional Programme (1934)
- Pursuit of Adonis, BBC Regional Programme London (1934)
- The Breadwinner, BBC National Programme Daventry (1935)
- Old Words to New Music, BBC Regional Programme London (1936)
- The Calendar, BBC Regional Programme London (1936) as Andy Lynn
- The Secret Garden, BBC Regional Programme London (1937)
- The Trial of Peter Potter, BBC Regional Programme Northern Ireland (1937)
- David Copperfield, BBC Regional Programme London (1937)
- On and Off, BBC Regional Programme London (1938)
- The Squirrel's Cage, BBC Regional Programme Northern (1938)
- A Radio Version of the Fred Astaire-Ginger Rogers film Top Hat, Regional Programme Northern Ireland (1938)
- Royal Matinee, Regional Programme London (1939)
- An excerpt from the Eric Maschwitz revue New Faces, BBC General Forces Programme (1940)
- The Dragon's Dinner, BBC Home Service (1940)
- Review After Review, BBC Home Service (1940)
- The New Ambassadors Review, BBC General Forces Programme (1941)
- £250 Red Cross Radio Contest, BBC Home Service (1941)
- Sammelkin, BBC Home Service (1941) as Timothy Trant
- Birds of a Feather, BBC Home Service (1941)
- Darling I Loathe You, BBC Home Service (1941)
- Behind The Laughter, BBC Home Service (1941) as Syd Fletcher (as a boy)
- Just Kidd-ing, BBC General Forces Programme (1941)
- Intimate Review 1914-1942, BBC Home Service (1942)
- At This Time of Night, BBC Home Service (1942)
- Norman and Henry Bones, the Boy Detectives, BBC Home Service (1943–1960) as Norman Bones (108 episodes)
- Old Chelsea, BBC Home Service (1943)
- They Went Singing, BBC Home Service (1943) as Alfred Mortimer
- The Box of Delights, BBC Home Service (1943) as Mouse
- David, BBC Home Service (1943) as David (as a boy)
- Mystery at Witchend, BBC Home Service (1943) as David Morton
- Paul of Tarsus, BBC Home Service (1944)
- Dr Johnson, BBC Home Service (1944) as Samuel Johnson (as a boy)
- Treasure Island, BBC Home Service (1944) as Jim Hawkins (as a boy)
- John Bunyan, BBC Home Service (1944) Dickon (as a man)
- The Will Hay Programme, BBC General Forces Programme (1944–1945)
- Music Hall, BBC Home Service (1944–1945)
- The Swish of the Curtain, BBC Home Service (1944)
- William Booth, BBC Home Service (1944) as Jim
- The Secret Six, BBC Home Service (1944) as Charles Bouvery
- The Secret Six Again, BBC Home Service (1944) as Charles
- Mr Perrin and Mr Traill, BBC Home Service (1944) as Larkin
- The Tinderbox, BBC Home Service (1944) as Shoemaker's boy
- A Voyage to Lilliput, BBC Home Service (1945)
- The Story of Joseph, BBC Light Programme (1944) as Benjamin
- Just William, BBC Light Programme (1945) as Hubert
- Harriot Mellon, BBC Home Service (1946) as Freddy
- The Pied Piper of Hamlyn, BBC Home Service (1946) as Second burgher
- Musical Theatre of the Air, "Dear Appointment", BBC Home Service (1946) as Gus Green, the boy
- The Wishing Apple, BBC Home Service (1946) as The Serpent
- Full Cycle, BBC Home Service (1946) as David Hardcastle
- The Edistone Light, BBC Home Service (1947)
- The Story of David, BBC Home Service (1947)
- No Sentiment in Business, BBC Home Service (1947) as Ernie
- Three Men in the Snow, BBC Home Service (1947) as Fritz Hagedorn
- A New Heaven and a New Earth, BBC Regional Programme London (1948)
- Tom Lord's Cricket Ground, BBC Home Service (1948)
- Fallada! Fallada!, BBC Home Service (1948) as Curdkin
- Show Parade, "Dempson's Dummies", BBC Light Programme (1948)
- The Old Wives Tale, BBC Home Service (1948) as Cyril Povey
- The October Review, BBC Home Service (1949)
- The Case of the Lump of Metals, BBC Home Service (1949) as Corporal Mackworth of the RAF
- A Christmas Carol, BBC Home Service (1949) as Peter Cratchit
- Snakes and Snake Charmers, BBC Home Service (1949) as Jeremy
- Golden Pavements, BBC Home Service (1949) as Jeremy
- The Adventures of PC49, BBC Home Service (1950) as Parvo
- Pincer's Progress, BBC Home Service (1950) as Moss
- A House to Let, BBC Home Service (1951) as Flip
- Henry of Navarre, BBC Home Service (1952) as Charles IX
- Oliver Twist, BBC Home Service (1952) as Tom Chitling
- Horace Clabtrout and the Beanstalk, BBC Home Service (1954) as Horace Clabtrout
- Ray's a Laugh, BBC Light Programme (1953–1957)
- The High and Mighty, BBC Home Service (1954) as Edward VI
- The Feast of Lanterns, BBC Home Service (1955) as Mouse
- The Magic Pond, BBC Home Service (1956) as Han Chung
- Tomorrow Mr Tompion!, BBC Home Service (1956) as Master Banger
- Writing for Sound: 2: Dreaming Bandsmen, BBC Home Service (1956) as Junker Jim
- The Siege of Mocking Hill, BBC Home Service (1956) as Mr. Trimble
- Life with the Lyons, "Dial Special Branch", BBC Light Programme (1958)
- I Only Arsked, BBC Light Programme (1958)
- The Memoirs of Betsy Mae Meadows, "Somewhere a Voice is Calling", BBC Home Service (1965) as Cyrus
- The 78 Show, BBC Radio 2 (1975) as self
- Burglar's Bargains, BBC Radio 4 (1979) as Fingers
- Funny You Should Ask, BBC Radio 2 (1981) as self
- A Right Royal Rip-off, BBC Radio 4 (1982) as Fingers
- The Bigger They Are, BBC Radio 4 (1985) as Fingers
- A Harvest of Hayes, BBC Radio 4 (1988) as self
