= 1963 in British music =

This is a summary of 1963 in music in the United Kingdom, including the official charts from that year.

== Summary ==
A notable development of 1963 was the rise to fame of The Beatles. Their first album, released in March 1963, marked the beginning of a run during which eleven of their twelve studio albums released in the United Kingdom up to 1970 reached number one, and their third single, "From Me to You", came out in April, starting an almost unbroken string of seventeen British number one singles for the band. Their initial impact on American television and radio audiences in November 1963 also marked the beginning of the British Invasion of the US charts by British groups, which began in earnest the following year.

Meanwhile, Benjamin Britten reached possibly the peak of his fame and popularity, not only with celebrations of his fiftieth birthday but also with the release of his recording of the War Requiem. This sold 200,000 copies within just five months of its release – and indeed might have sold more if Decca Records had not been caught on the hop by its phenomenal success both in the UK and the US, so failing to capitalise on the initial demand – and won three Grammy awards.

== Events ==
- 3 January – The Beatles begin their first tour of 1963 with a five-day tour in Scotland to support the release of their new single, "Love Me Do", beginning with a performance in Elgin.
- 3–5, 7–8 and 10 January – Decca records Benjamin Britten conducting his 1962 War Requiem with the soloists he originally composed it for: Galina Vishnevskaya, Peter Pears and Dietrich Fischer-Dieskau together with the London Symphony Orchestra and The Bach Choir, in London. Within five months of its release the recording sells 200,000 copies, an unheard-of number for a piece of contemporary classical music at this time.
- 11 January – The John Lennon single "Please Please Me" is released by The Beatles in the UK, with "Ask Me Why" as the B-side.
- 11 February – The Beatles record their debut album Please Please Me in a single day at the Abbey Road Studios in London.
- 16 February – The Beatles achieve their first No. 1 hit single when "Please Please Me" tops the New Musical Express and Melody Maker charts in the UK.
- 22 February – The Beatles form Northern Songs Publishing Company.
- 22 March – The Beatles release their first album, Please Please Me.
- 23 March – The 8th Eurovision Song Contest is held in two studios at the BBC Television Centre, London. After much confusion regarding the results of the Norwegian jury, Denmark snatches victory from Switzerland after a close run when Danish husband-and-wife duo Grethe and Jørgen Ingmann take the prize with "Dansevise".
- 29 April – 19-year-old Andrew Loog Oldham signs a contract with The Rolling Stones, becoming their manager. Oldham had seen the band in concert the previous day at the Crawdaddy Club in London. One of the new manager's first actions is to remove Ian Stewart from the stage line-up, demoting him to road manager.
- 2 May – The Beatles reach No. 1 in what becomes the official UK Singles Chart (in Record Retailer) for the first time with the Lennon–McCartney composition "From Me to You".
- 11 May – The Beatles album Please Please Me goes to the top of the UK Albums Chart.
- 15 May – The recording of Benjamin Britten's War Requiem wins the composer three Grammy awards. Leslie Bricusse and Anthony Newley win Song of the Year for "What Kind of Fool Am I?"; other nominations include Lionel Bart for "As Long as He Needs Me".
- 29 May – On the 50th anniversary of its stormy première, 88-year-old Pierre Monteux conducts the London Symphony Orchestra in The Rite of Spring at the Royal Albert Hall, with its 81-year-old composer Igor Stravinsky in the audience.
- 7 June – The Rolling Stones' first single "Come On" is released in the UK.
- 30 July – Mahler's Second Symphony gets its first performance at the Proms, and proves so popular that conductor Leopold Stokowski and the London Symphony Orchestra play the whole of the final movement again as an encore.
- 3 August – The Beatles perform at The Cavern Club for the final time.
- 12 September – The Beatles reach No. 1 for the second time (according to the 'official' chart) with the Lennon–McCartney single "She Loves You" (released on 23 August).
- 15 October – The Daily Mirror uses the term "Beatlemania" in a news story about the group's concert the previous day in Cheltenham.
- 25 October – The Melos Ensemble premiere Reflections on a Theme by Benjamin Britten, a composite work by Richard Rodney Bennett, Nicholas Maw and Malcolm Williamson written as a tribute to Britten on his 50th birthday, at the Mahatma Gandhi Hall, 41 Fitzroy Square, London.
- October – The Springfields play their last concert, at the London Palladium. Three weeks later Dusty Springfield releases her first solo single.
- 29 October – Chart-topping singer Michael Holliday, depressed by marital and financial troubles, commits suicide by means of a drug overdose in Croydon.
- 22 November – The Beatles release their second album, With the Beatles.
- 30 November – After an unbroken 30-week spell at the top of the UK Albums Chart, The Beatles album Please Please Me is knocked off the top of the charts by With the Beatles.
- 12 December – The Beatles reach No. 1 for the third time (according to the 'official' chart) with the Lennon–McCartney single "I Want to Hold Your Hand" (released on 29 November).

== Charts ==
- See UK No.1 Hits of 1963

== Classical music ==
=== New works ===
- Benjamin Britten – Nocturnal after John Dowland
- Arwel Hughes – Pantycelyn (oratorio)
- Michael Tippett – Concerto for Orchestra
- William Walton – A Shakespeare Suite from Richard III
- Grace Williams – Trumpet Concerto

=== Opera ===
- Richard Rodney Bennett – The Mines of Sulphur
- Daniel Jones – The Knife
- Malcolm Williamson – Our Man in Havana

== Film and Incidental music ==
- John Addison – Tom Jones, starring Albert Finney.
- John Barry – From Russia with Love, starring Sean Connery.
- Richard Rodney Bennett – Billy Liar directed by John Schlesinger, starring Tom Courtenay.

== Musical theatre ==
- 4 July – Première of Pickwick, with music by Cyril Ornadel and lyrics by Leslie Bricusse, starring Harry Secombe in the title role.

== Musical films ==
- It's All Happening, starring Tommy Steele
- Live It Up!, starring David Hemmings, Kenny Ball
- Summer Holiday, starring Cliff Richard
- What a Crazy World, starring Joe Brown

== Births ==
- 15 January – Conrad Lant, English singer-songwriter and bass player (Venom and Cronos)
- 19 January – Caron Wheeler, singer
- 25 January – Carl Fysh, keyboardist (Brother Beyond)
- 11 February – Karen Matheson, folk singer
- 19 February – Seal, singer
- 20 February – Ian Brown, singer, musician (The Stone Roses)
- 21 February – Ranking Roger, musician (d. 2019)
- 16 March – Jerome Flynn, actor and singer
- 8 April – Julian Lennon, musician son of John Lennon
- 19 April – Graham Fitkin, composer, pianist and conductor
- 10 May – Debbie Wiseman, film composer
- 1 June – Mike Joyce, drummer (The Smiths)
- 25 June – George Michael, singer and songwriter (d. 2016)
- 26 June – Harriet Wheeler, English singer-songwriter (The Sundays)
- 2 July – Mark Kermode, English bassist and critic (The Dodge Brothers)
- 6 July – Stuart Garrard, guitarist
- 8 July – Susan Chilcott, operatic soprano (died 2003)
- 9 July – John Mark Ainsley, lyric tenor
- 25 August – Candida Doyle, keyboardist (Pulp)
- 29 August – Elizabeth Fraser, singer (Cocteau Twins)
- 3 August – Tasmin Archer, singer
- 11 September – John Pickard, composer
- 19 September – Jarvis Cocker, singer and songwriter (Pulp)
- 31 October – Johnny Marr, guitarist (The Smiths)
- 1 November – Rick Allen, drummer (Def Leppard)
- date unknown
  - Philip Cashian, composer, head of composition, Royal Academy of Music
  - Michael Zev Gordon, composer

== Deaths ==
- 17 March – William Henry Squire, cellist, 91
- 5 April – Julius Harrison, conductor and composer, 78
- 6 April – Anthony Bernard, organist, pianist, conductor and composer, 72
- 24 June – Sybil Evers, singer and actress, 59
- 29 August – Emma Lomax, composer and pianist, 90
- 10 September – Jack Beaver, film score composer, 63
- 15 September – Oliver Wallace, conductor and composer, 76
- 21 September – Ernest Whitfield, 1st Baron Kenswood, violinist, 76
- 29 October – Michael Holliday, singer, 38 (drug overdose)
- 5 November – Norman Walker, operatic bass, 55
- 11 December – Anthony Collins, conductor and composer, 70
- 26 December – Gwynn Parry Jones, singer, 72
- date unknown – Joy Boughton, oboist, 50

== See also ==
- 1963 in British radio
- 1963 in British television
- 1963 in the United Kingdom
- List of British films of 1963
