= Hugh Dempster =

British actor (1900–1987)

- with Vera-Ellen in Happy Go Lovely (1951)
- Born: 3 August 1900; London, England
- Died: 30 April 1987 (aged 86); Chicago, Illinois, United States
- Occupation: Actor
- Spouse: Emma Trekman

Hugh Dempster (3 August 1900 – 30 April 1987) was a British theatre and film actor, whose credits include more than 60 films.

Born in London, Dempster made his stage debut in 1920, and began his screen career in the silent film era. His credits included Vice Versa, Anna Karenina, The Winslow Boy, The Fan, Scrooge, The House Across the Lake and The Ghost Train (short film).

During World War II, Dempster served in the Royal Air Force.

Thirty-six years separated Dempster's first and last appearances on Broadway. He debuted in the 1929 melodrama Rope's End by Patrick Hamilton and in 1965 replaced Peter Sallis as Dr. Watson in the Sherlock Holmes-inspired musical Baker Street. In total, he played in several dozen productions.

Dempster died in Chicago, Illinois.

== Selected filmography ==
- The Great Well (1924)
- Lord Babs (1932)
- Music Hath Charms (1935)
- The Student's Romance (1935)
- Crackerjack (1938)
- Marigold (1938)
- Three Silent Men (1940)
- Garrison Follies (1940)
- Candles at Nine (1944) as Hugh Lacey
- Waltz Time (1945)
- The Trojan Brothers (1946)
- Dumb Dora Discovers Tobacco (1946)
- Anna Karenina (1948)
- Flesh and Blood (1951)
- Happy Go Lovely (1951)
- Scrooge (1951)
