= Gabrielle Blunt =

British actress (1919–2014)

- Born: 8 January 1919; Blean, Kent, England
- Died: 10 June 2014 (aged 95); Denville Hall, London, England
- Occupation: Actress
- Years active: 1940s–2001
- Spouses: Tony Thawnton (m. 1941; div. 1950) Julian Bond (m. 1955; div. 1972)

Gabrielle Hilda Blunt (8 January 1919 – 10 June 2014) was a British actress. She had a very long career in theatre, film and television mainly working as a character actress appearing in many British television programmes and films.

== Biography ==
Blunt was the daughter and only child of Henry Wilfrid Blunt and Maud Etta Hyde, who were married on 10 May 1915. She was the granddaughter of Sir John Harvey Blunt, eighth Baronet Blunt of London and Susan Hoad.

Blunt began her theatrical career in regional rep in the early 1940s touring Europe with the Entertainments National Service Association in 1945. The same year, she was seen in Vanbrugh's The Confederacy at the York Festival. In March 1945 she appeared in the stage version of "Pink String and Sealing Wax" by Roland Pertwee at the Grand Theatre, Derby. The Manager and Stage Director was Frank Tomsett and the play was directed by William Armstrong and the Author.

Blunt's first significant role was as Catriona Macroon in the film Whisky Galore!. In the early 1990s she appeared in a documentary about the film Whisky Galore, which was later also on a DVD release of the original 1949 film.

Blunt also appeared as Mrs Bulstrode in Wilt, a 1989 film adaptation of Tom Sharpe's novel. She became best known for her roles in British sitcoms, appearing over the years in Happy Ever After, Shine on Harvey Moon, Roll Over Beethoven, Drop the Dead Donkey, All Creatures Great and Small, The Fast Show, Pat & Margaret, Harry Enfield's Television Programme and Paul Merton: The Series and The Thin Blue Line.

She appeared in an early episode of the popular BBC sitcom One Foot in the Grave as Mrs Birkett, an elderly neighbour who accidentally gets trapped in the Meldrews' loft when Victor closes the trap door whilst she is up there looking for jumble that Margaret has prepared for her. She continues to be mentioned throughout the rest of the series, but is not seen again.

When she was nearly 80, in 1998, Blunt toured the UK and Europe in Out of Joint's premiere of Caryl Churchill's Blue Heart and she travelled to New York the following year to perform in it.

Blunt was married and divorced twice and had three children. Her first husband was the actor Tony Thawnton. Her second husband, Julian Bond, adopted her two children from her first marriage.

She continued to work in television and theatre until the early 2000s. Her final appearance on television was in November 2001 in an episode of the series Heartbeat.

She died at the age of 95 of natural causes in the actors' retirement home Denville Hall in London, England, on 10 June 2014.

== Partial filmography ==
Year	Title	Role	Notes
1949	Whisky Galore!	Catriona Macroon	
1950	Tony Draws a Horse	Grace	
1950	The Clouded Yellow	Addie the Housekeeper	Uncredited
1951	The Rossiter Case	Alice	
1952	Mandy	Miss Larner	
1953	Noose for a Lady	Agnes Potter	
1953	36 Hours	Wren	Uncredited
1954	The Love Lottery	Doreen	
1954	Dance Little Lady	Switchboard Operator	
1958	Rockets Galore!	Catriona	Uncredited
1963	Breath of Life	Winnie	
1976	Secrets of a Superstud	Aunt Cissy	
1989	Wilt	Mrs Bulstrode	
