= Call My Bluff =

British TV panel game (1965–2004)

- Genre: Panel game show
- Created by: Mark Goodson; Bill Todman
- Presented by: Robin Ray; Joe Melia; Peter Wheeler; Robert Robinson; Bob Holness; Fiona Bruce; Angus Deayton
- Theme music composer: Norrie Paramor
- Opening theme: "Ciccolino"
- Country of origin: United Kingdom
- Original language: English
- No. of series: 25 (BBC2); 9 (BBC1)
- No. of episodes: 542 (BBC2); 550 (BBC1)

Production
- Production location: Pebble Mill Studios (1996–2005)
- Running time: 30 minutes
- Production company: BBC Pebble Mill (1996–2005)

Original release
- Network: BBC Two
- Release: 17 October 1965 – 16 April 1994
- Network: BBC One
- Release: 13 May 1996 – 17 July 2005

Call My Bluff is a British panel game show based on the short-lived US version of the same name. It was originally hosted by Robin Ray and later, most notably, by Robert Robinson. Its most prominent panellist was Frank Muir. The theme music for the show was "Ciccolino" by Norrie Paramor.

== Format ==
The game comprised two teams of three (a captain and two guests) who would compete to earn points by identifying the correct definitions of obscure words. The teams took turns to give three definitions, one true and two bluffs, while the other team attempted to determine which was correct. If the correct choice was made the team earned one point, if not, the bluffing team earned one point. Both teams took turns bluffing and determining definitions.

Examples of words used in the show, taken from a 1972 book published in connection with it, include queach, strongle, ablewhacket, hickboo, jargoon, zurf, morepork, and jirble. The word queach was defined by the contestants as "a malicious caricature", "a cross between a quince and a peach" and "a mini-jungle of mixed vegetation" (with the last definition being the true one).

== Broadcast history ==
Call My Bluff originally aired on BBC2 from 17 October 1965 to 22 December 1988.

Robert Morley and Frank Muir captained the teams. Morley was later succeeded by Patrick Campbell, and Arthur Marshall took over in 1980. Various celebrities also stood in as team captains, including Kenneth Horne, Kenneth Williams and Alan Melville. The original series finished after Marshall's death, although a general change in the tone and atmosphere of broadcasting at the time may also have affected its temporary demise. For the majority of this run (from 1967 onwards) the host was Robert Robinson.

The show was resurrected in 1996 after an eight-year rest (apart from one special edition on 16 April 1994 for BBC Two's thirtieth birthday, which still featured Robert Robinson, but this time with Joanna Lumley as a team captain opposite Frank Muir), now as a daytime series on BBC1. It began airing on 13 May 1996 with Alan Coren and Sandi Toksvig as the team captains and Bob Holness replacing Robinson as chairman.

It was originally axed in 2002 after 499 editions, but was revived in January 2003 where Toksvig was replaced by the journalist Rod Liddle and newsreader Fiona Bruce took the chair. The series finished again on 17 July 2005.

Call My Bluff returned for a special during the BBC's 24 Hour Panel People in aid of Comic Relief 2011, with Alex Horne, Roisin Conaty, Russell Tovey, Tim Key, Sarah Cawood and David Walliams participating. The host was Angus Deayton.

== Transmissions ==
=== BBC2 ===
Series	Start date	End date	Episodes
1	17 October 1965	29 June 1966	37
2	2 October 1966	14 April 1967	26
3	1 October 1967	7 July 1968	39
4	24 April 1969	28 May 1970	59
5	14 September 1970	25 January 1971	20
6	14 June 1971	7 February 1972	34
7	13 November 1972	7 May 1973	26
8	3 September 1973	28 January 1974	22
9	30 September 1974	24 March 1975	26
10	29 April 1976	12 August 1976	16
11	29 April 1977	12 August 1977	16
12	22 March 1978	2 August 1978	18
13	2 January 1979	15 May 1979	20
14	13 January 1980	30 March 1980	12
15	3 July 1980	4 September 1980	10
16	13 February 1981	26 July 1981	20
17	28 January 1982	17 June 1982	20
18	11 April 1983	4 September 1983	20
19	23 January 1984	20 August 1984	29
20	19 October 1984	21 December 1984	10
21	29 October 1985	31 December 1985	10
22	8 January 1987	28 May 1987	20
23	10 September 1987	10 December 1987	14
24	14 April 1988	16 June 1988	9
25	26 October 1988	22 December 1988	8
One-off	16 April 1994		1

=== BBC1 ===
Series	Start date	End date	Episodes
1	13 May 1996	31 May 1996	14
2	2 September 1996	10 January 1997	80
3	1 April 1997	16 July 1997	58
4	2 September 1997	3 April 1998	131
5	5 January 1999	1 April 1999	65
5	23 May 2000		65
6	6 September 1999	17 December 1999	75
6	22 May 2000		75
7	24 May 2000	30 May 2002	77
8	19 May 2003	1 July 2003	30
9	1 June 2004	17 July 2005	20

Season 4 was due to premiere on 1 September 1997, but was postponed due to the death of Diana, Princess of Wales the night before. It was replaced by a delayed Going for a Song.

== Book ==
- Call my Bluff by Frank Muir and Patrick Campbell, published by Eyre Methuen, London, 1972.

== Reception ==
=== Critical response ===
Jon E. Lewis and Penny Stempel described Call My Bluff as a "civilised panel game" built on "verbal deception", with teams offering "plausible but false definitions".

== References in other works ==
- An episode of the early-1980s LWT sketch-comedy series End of Part One parodied the show as Scrape My Barrel, where panelists had to figure out the meaning of the word working class.
- The show (and in particular its host, Robert Robinson) was the subject of a sketch by Stephen Fry and Hugh Laurie in the second series of A Bit of Fry and Laurie.
- In the "Europe" episode of QI (series E), a segment was featured entitled "Call My Euro Bluff", featuring stories about laws in the EU. The panel then had to decide whether each story was true or a "bløff" (Stephen Fry pronounced it "blerff"). Fry frequently drops into the impersonation of Robinson that he used in the sketch from A Bit of Fry and Laurie.
- In the Doctor Who episode "Bad Wolf" Call My Bluff is mentioned as one of the games hosted in the game station.
- In May 2014 the quirks of the show were lampooned by Harry Enfield and Paul Whitehouse in BBC Two's satirical Harry and Paul's Story of the Twos, where the show was given the name "Speech Impediment" and the word chosen for the panel was paedophile.
