= Norman Harrison =

Australian sports shooter (born 1939)

Personal information
- Nationality: Australian
- Born: 13 May 1939 (age 87)

Sport
- Sport: Sports shooting
Medal record
Men's Shooting
British Commonwealth Games
Silver medal – second place	1974 Christchurch	Free pistol

Norman Edward Harrison (born 13 May 1939) is an Australian sports shooter. He competed in the men's 50 metre free pistol event at the 1976 Summer Olympics.
