= Polypropylene stacking chair =

Chair designed by Robin Day

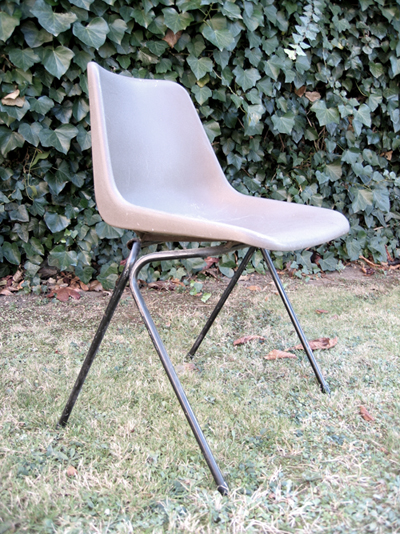
Hille Polypropylenne Chair (1963)

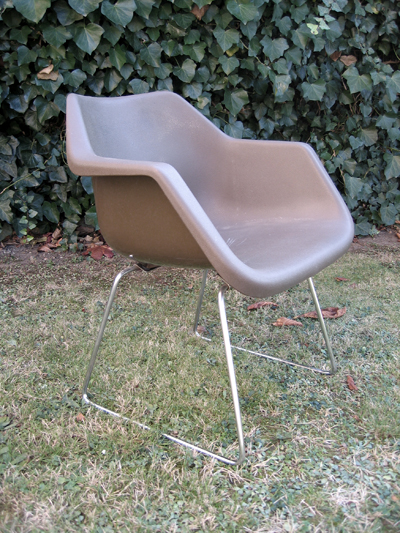
Hille Polypropylene Armchair with ski base (1967)

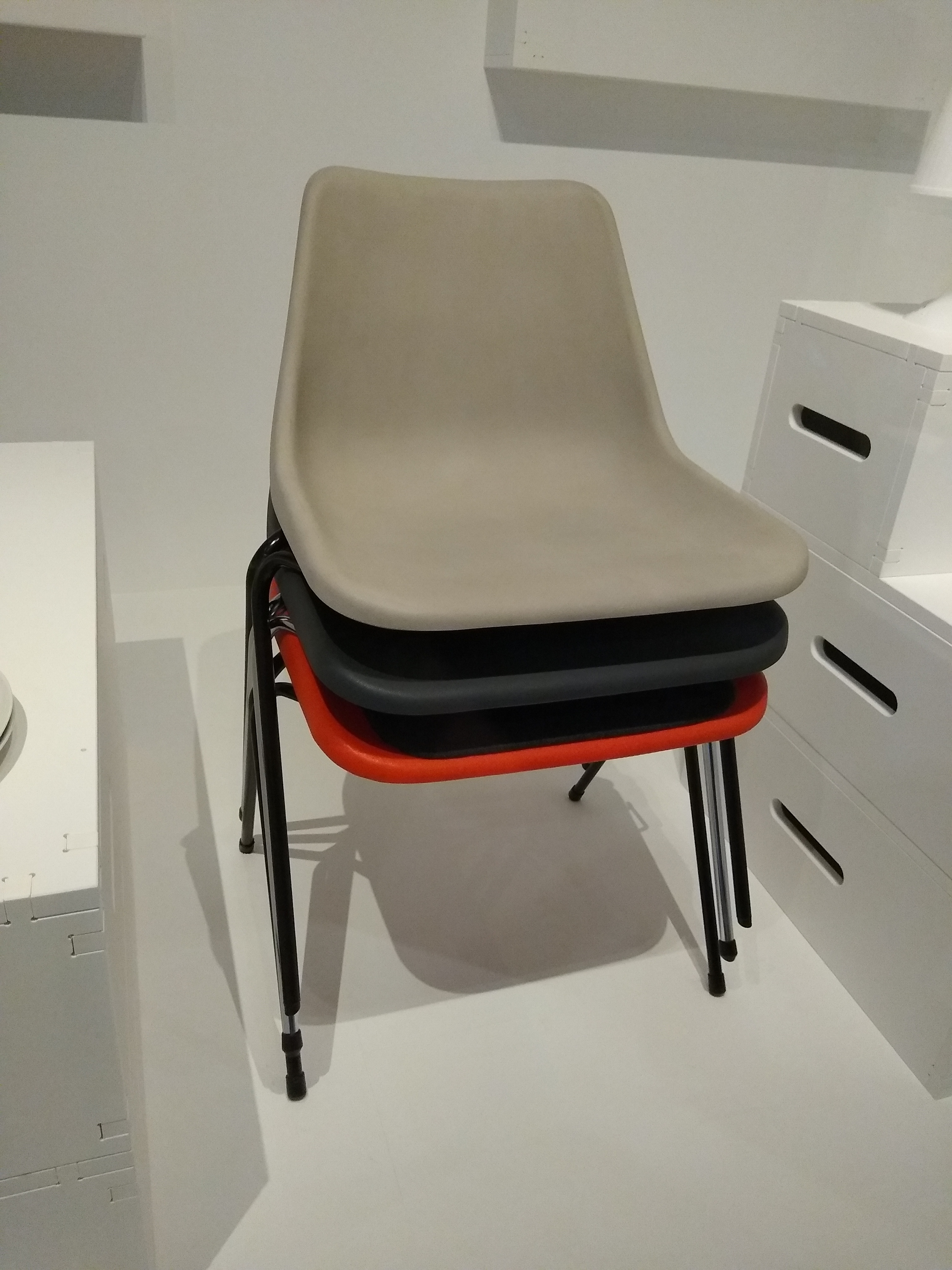
Robin Day polypropylene stacking chairs (1963)

The polypropylene stacking chair or polyprop is a chair manufactured in an injection moulding process using polypropylene. It was designed by Robin Day in 1963 for S. Hille & Co. It is now so iconic that it was selected as one of eight designs in a 2009 series of British stamps of "British Design Classics".

The polypropylene stacking chair is one of the very few chairs that, after over 50 years, is still in production and has been manufactured in forty countries around the world, for use in schools, hospitals, airports, canteens, restaurants, arenas, hotels, as well as homes.

== History ==
The chair first appeared on the market in a choice of charcoal or flame-red colours at a price of just under £3. The side chair won a Council of Industrial Design (now the Design Council) award in 1965.

The brief from Hille was for a low-cost, mass-produced stacking chair that would be affordable to all and meet virtually every seating requirement. Over time, it became available in a wide variety of colours and with different forms of base and upholstery. These variations have included Series E for children, made in five sizes with lifting holes, and Polo, which features rows of graduated circular holes, making it suitable for outdoor use.

== Mass production ==
The one-piece seat and back were injection moulded from polypropylene, a lightweight thermoplastic with a high impact resistance. Polypropylene was invented by an Italian scientist, Giulio Natta, in 1954.

Examples of the 1973 polypropylene stacking chair can be seen at Clifton Cathedral, Bristol, where it is used for the Nave and Sanctuary seating.

== See also ==
- Monobloc (chair)
- List of chairs
