= Breath of Life (1963 film) =

1963 British film by J. Henry Piperno

- Directed by: J. Henry Piperno
- Screenplay by: J. Henry Piperno
- Produced by: Bill Luckwell
- Starring: George Moon; Larry Martyn; April Wilding
- Cinematography: Cedric Williams
- Music by: Wilfred Burns
- Production company: Norcon Film Productions
- Release date: 6 October 1963
- Running time: 67 minutes
- Country: United Kingdom
- Language: English

Breath of Life is a 1963 British second feature ('B') film directed and written by J. Henry Piperno and starring George Moon, Larry Martyn and April Wilding.

== Plot ==
Garage mechanic Freddie gives the kiss of life to an abandoned baby, and saves its life. Twenty years pass, and the grown child – Tony – is arrested for theft and put on probation. Despite Freddie's continued help and kindness, Tony pursues a life of crime, and involves Freddie's children, Harry and Monica, in a bank robbery, where he kills the cashier. Tony and his gang escape, but the stolen money is taken by a rival gang. Together with accomplice Spud, Tony, Harry and Monica head for London, where they are arrested and tried. Tony is sentenced to death, Harry is imprisoned and Monica is acquitted. Freddie reflects on the breath of life he gave to baby Tony.

== Cast ==
- George Moon as Freddie
- Larry Martyn as Tony
- April Wilding as Monica
- Barry Halliday as Spud
- Vivienne Lacey as Marilyn
- Hugh Halliday as Harry
- Gabrielle Blunt as Winnie
- Leslie Wright as Max

== Reception ==
The Monthly Film Bulletin wrote: "Only the ending – with its seemingly unjust prison sentence for the innocent Harry – makes any sort of departure from convention and routine. The plot itself is weak and unconvincing, the acting and direction substandard."

Kine Weekly wrote: "This routine crime story makes an adequate support. Incidentally it will go on release with BLC/Columbia's The Running Man. ... In its class, this is a competent job without pretensions, but showing occasional signs of a limited budget. The story and direction offer no surprises and the acting is on a similar level. George Moon, as Freddie, Larry Martyn, as Tony, Barry Halliday, as Spud, and April Wilding, as Monica, all contribute solid performances."

In The British B Film, Chibnall and McFarlane describe the film as "an impoverished crook drama".
