= George Moon =

English actor (1909–1981)

George Moon in Time Flies (1944)

George Moon (19 March 1909 – 17 December 1981) was an English stage, film and television actor.

During the late 1950s he appeared as Ginger Smart in the television series Shadow Squad and its sequel Skyport.

Moon's largest television role came in 1977 when he played Tipping the butler in the short lived television series Lord Tramp alongside Hugh Lloyd and Joan Sims.

His daughter is the actress Georgina Moon.

George Moon (left), with Cecil Scott, and Pal Hanna in the talkie film "Diggers".

== Selected filmography ==
- Diggers (1931) – Joe Mulga
- A Co-respondent's Course (1931)
- Diggers in Blighty (1933) – Joe Mulga
- Lightning Conductor (1938) – George
- Me and My Pal (1939) – Hal Thommson
- Time Flies (1944) – Bill Barton
- What Do We Do Now? (1946)
- An Alligator Named Daisy (1955) – Al
- It's a Wonderful World (1956) – Taxi Driver
- Carry On Admiral (1957) – Casey (uncredited)
- Davy (1958) – Jerry
- The Boys (1962) – Mr. Champneys
- Breath of Life (1963) – Freddie
- A Matter of Choice (1963) – Spike
- Die, Monster, Die! (1965) – Taxi Driver (uncredited)
- Promise Her Anything (1965) – Neighbour
- Half a Sixpence (1967) – Pub Character
- Carry On Camping (1969) – Scrawny Man
- Carry On Dick (1974) – Mr. Giles
- Eskimo Nell (1975) – Nightwatchman
- Yesterday's Hero (1979) – Changing Room Attendant (uncredited)
