= Serge Semenenko =

Former Hollywood Banker

Serge Semenenko (1903 – April 24, 1980) was a prominent member of the so-called "White Russian" emigre community that fled Bolshevism and revolution, achieving success as a Hollywood banker in the 1950s and 1960s through his affiliation with the First National Bank of Boston. His is remembered as a gracious and generous philanthropist. His most notable gift was an elegant Park Avenue mansion in the northern reaches of Manhattan's Upper east Side, presented to the Synod of Bishops of the Russian Orthodox Church Outside of Russia in 1958.

He was born in Odessa (then part of Imperial Russia) on August 26, 1903 and fled with his family to Constantinople (now Istanbul ) at the age of 18. There he studied studied at both Classical College and Robert College and graduated with a GPA of 8.5 out of 10. He then moved to the United States to continue his studies at Harvard Business School.

In 1956 he was part of a group of investors who bought out the shares in Warner Bros. Pictures that were sold by Harry Warner and Albert Warner.

The Warners bought the Brunswick label in 1930, but the collapse of the record market during the Great Depression cost the studio heavily and the label was sold to the American Record Corporation at the end of 1931 for a fraction of its former value. As a result, Warner Bros. had shied away from any involvement in the record business for the next 25 years.

According to music historian Fred Goodman, Semenenko had a strong interest in the entertainment business. After joining the Warner Bros. board he pushed studio boss Jack L. Warner to establish a recorded music division, which was eventually incorporated in 1958 as Warner Bros. Records.

Semenenko put together a syndicate of six banks in 1963 to help a troubled Curtis Publishing Company.

In 1967, he resigned as vice-chairman and a director of First Boston after his activities were dissected in a first article in The Wall Street Journal.
