= Lina Basquette =

American actress (1907–1994)

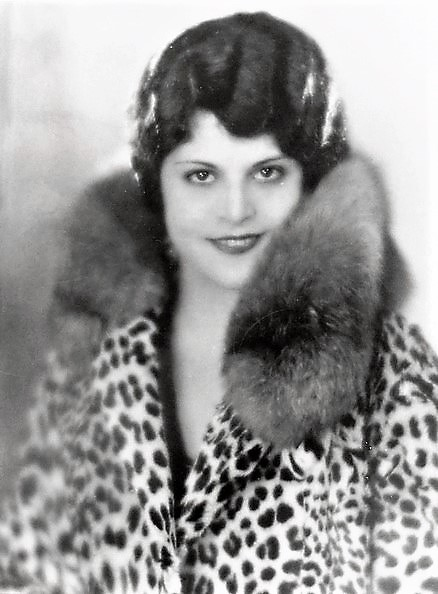
- Photographed by John de Mirjian
- Born: Lena Copeland Baskette; April 19, 1907; San Mateo, California, U.S.
- Died: September 30, 1994 (aged 87); Wheeling, West Virginia, U.S.
- Other names: Lena Baskette; Lena Basquette
- Occupation: Actress
- Years active: 1916–1943, 1991
- Spouses: Sam Warner (m. 1925; died 1927) Peverell Marley (m. 1929; div. 1930) Ray Hallam (m. 1931; died 1931) Theodore Hayes (m. 1931; div. 1932) (m. 1934; div. 1935) Henry Mollison (m. 1937; div. 1944) Warner Gilmore (m. 1947; div. 1950) Frank Mancuso (m. 1959; sep. 1959)
- Children: 2
- Relatives: Marge Champion (half-sister) Richard Belcher (half-brother)

Lina Basquette (born Lena Copeland Baskette; April 19, 1907 – September 30, 1994) was an American actress. She is noted for her 75-year career in entertainment, which began during the silent film era. Talented as a dancer, she was paid as a girl for performing and gained her first film contract at age nine. In her acting career, Basquette may have been best known for her role as Judith in The Godless Girl (1929).

Basquette also was noted for her several marriages, including her first, to the much older noted producer, Sam Warner, a co-founder of Warner Bros. film studio. When her film career declined, she returned for a period to dancing and stage performances. After she retired from the entertainment world, in 1947 Basquette moved to Bucks County, Pennsylvania, where she became a noted breeder of Great Danes; her dogs won numerous professional show prizes. She wrote several books on dog breeding as well. Later living in West Virginia, she also served as a judge for the American Kennel Club, and wrote a column.

== Early years ==
Basquette was born on April 19, 1907, as Lena Copeland Baskette, to parents Frank E. Baskette, a drugstore owner, and his wife Gladys Lee (née Rosenberg) Baskette in San Mateo, California. She began dancing as a child. A Victor Talking Machine Company representative saw her dancing to a record in her father's store. He hired her at the age of eight (through her parents) to advertise Victrolas at the 1915 Panama–Pacific International Exposition, held in San Francisco. Basquette later began studying ballet.

Baskette secured her first film contract at the age of nine in 1916 with Universal Studios in Los Angeles for the silent film series Lena Baskette Featurettes. Shortly after she was signed with Universal, her father Frank Baskette died by suicide. Baskette later blamed her father's death on her mother's ambition for fame and fortune.

Within a year, Gladys Baskette married dance director Ernest Belcher. Their daughter Marjorie Belcher, half-sister to Lina, was born in 1919 in Los Angeles, where the family was then living. Marjorie became a dancer and choreographer known as Marge Champion.

== Career ==
=== Early success ===
In 1923, Baskette and her mother traveled across the country by train to New York City, so that the girl could audition for John Murray Anderson. Anderson urged her to change the spelling of her surname from "Baskette" to "Basquette". Producer Charles Dillingham changed the spelling of her first name from "Lena" to "Lina" saying, "Lena is a cook, Lina is an artiste."

Before she could sign with Anderson, Florenz Ziegfeld cast the 16-year-old Basquette in his Ziegfeld Follies and cast her as a featured dancer. The Follies producers officially dubbed her "America's Prima Ballerina." The girl gained notice from Russian prima ballerina Anna Pavlova, who wanted to mentor her in classical ballet. Her mother Gladys Baskette decided that a career as a ballerina would not yield enough money and turned down Pavlova's offer. Basquette later said "I dreamed of being in a ballet company and it broke my heart."

== Marriage and family ==
By 1925, at age 18, Basquette was appearing in two concurrent Ziegfeld productions. She was spotted in Louie the 14th by Sam Warner, film producer and co-founder of Warner Bros. studio. Warner instantly fell in love with her and proposed marriage. Basquette did not want to marry him, as he was twenty years older than she. Her mother insisted that Basquette accept Warner's proposal, believing that the producer was wealthy (at the time, Warner Bros. was losing money).

Basquette and Warner were married in July 1925. After the marriage, Basquette grew to love and respect Warner; the couple had a daughter, Lita, in 1926. Warner died suddenly on October 5, 1927, the day before the opening of the highly anticipated Warner Bros. film, The Jazz Singer, which he had been working on tirelessly. Basquette was devastated by his death. She spent years battling Warner's family over money and custody of the couple's daughter.

== Return to films ==
Basquette returned to work in 1928, appearing in four films. That year, she was named one of thirteen WAMPAS Baby Stars. The following year, she appeared in The Younger Generation, directed by Frank Capra.

=== The Godless Girl ===
In 1929, she starred in the partial-sound film, The Godless Girl, directed by Cecil B. DeMille. This is the role for which she is best known. Basquette plays the title character Judith, who is based on Queen Silver, a child prodigy who early made speeches as a socialist activist. Judith is the leader of a high school atheist society; she forces members to renounce the Bible while placing a hand on the head of a live monkey.

In the film's climactic scene, DeMille insisted on realism while filming the reformatory going up in flames. During the filming, Basquette's eyelashes and eyebrows were burned. The Godless Girl was not a box office success in the United States, but it did well in Austria and Germany. Basquette later recalled that she received a fan letter from Adolf Hitler (before he achieved his political power) saying that she was his favorite movie star.

=== Decline ===
After appearing in The Godless Girl, Basquette found her popularity declining and she was offered fewer film roles. She was unofficially blacklisted in Hollywood due to her legal battles with the Warner family, which was trying to take custody of her daughter with Sam Warner in order to rear her as Jewish, and challenged settlement of his estate. She made a successful transition to sound films and appeared in some Western films in the 1930s.

In January 1937, Basquette was offered a contract with the Universum Film AG studio in Germany after the Nazi Party had taken power. After arriving in Germany, she was driven to Berchtesgaden, where she met Adolf Hitler, Rudolf Hess, and Joseph Goebbels. She later claimed that Hitler made a pass at her, and she kicked him in the groin. When he persisted, Basquette told him that her maternal grandfather, Lazarus Rosenberg, was Jewish. She left Germany the following day.

As her career in films continued to decline, Basquette returned to dancing. She performed in nightclubs and on the vaudeville circuit. In 1939, Basquette and her fifth husband, English actor Henry Mollison, appeared on stage together in Idiot's Delight, which toured in the United States, Australia and New Zealand. After appearing in 1943's A Night for Crime, Basquette retired from films.

== Later years ==
On August 9, 1943, Basquette was raped and robbed in Burbank, California after she gave a ride to 22-year-old army private George Paul Rimke. Basquette later testified that after she picked up the soldier, he forced her into the backseat and raped her. Rimke denied the charges but was found guilty on August 26, 1943, and sentenced to life in prison.

In 1947, Basquette used money from a trust fund left to her by her first husband, Sam Warner, and purchased a farm in Bucks County, Pennsylvania. In 1950, she and her sixth husband Warner Gilmore opened Honey Hollow Kennels; they began breeding and showing Great Danes. Basquette became the single biggest winner of Great Dane breed shows and was known as a noted dog breeder. She also wrote several books on the subject of dog breeding.

She retired from dog handling in 1983. Basquette moved to Wheeling, West Virginia, after her retirement. She continued to judge dog shows for the American Kennel Club and wrote a monthly column for Kennel Review.

Renewed interest in Basquette's films was sparked after a profile of her was published in 1989 in The New Yorker. Her films were screened in Washington, D.C. at the National Gallery of Art and at the Silent Movie Theatre in Los Angeles.

Basquette published her autobiography, Lina: DeMille's Godless Girl, in 1991. That same year she was cast in her first film in 48 years, an independent production titled Paradise Park. She played a grandmother who dreamed God was coming to grant a wish to residents of an Appalachian trailer park. The film also stars Porter Wagoner and Johnny Paycheck. It was her final film role.

== Personal life ==
=== Marriages and children ===
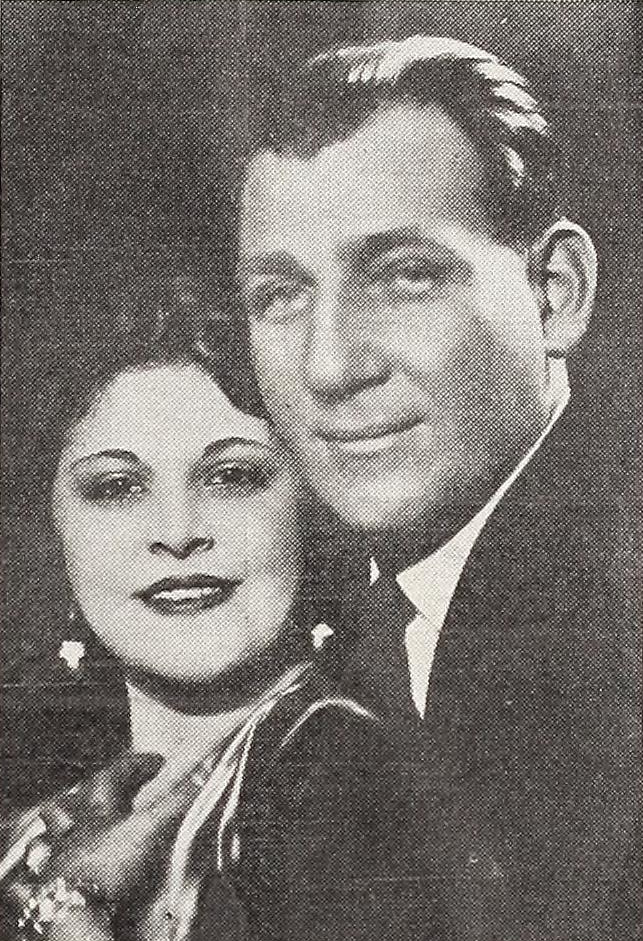
Basquette with her first husband, Sam Warner, about the time their daughter was born

Basquette was married 8 times. Basquette's first marriage was to Sam Warner, film producer and co-founder of Warner Bros. studio. The two were married on July 4, 1925, despite Warner's family's disapproval because Basquette was Catholic and not Jewish. They had a daughter, Lita (named after Charlie Chaplin's wife Lita Grey) in October 1926. After suffering severe headaches and a sinus infection aggravated by several abscessed teeth, Warner was admitted to California Lutheran Hospital in September 1927. Doctors discovered that he had developed a mastoid infection that was spreading to his brain. After four surgeries to remove the infection, Warner slipped into a coma. He died of pneumonia caused by sinusitis as well as epidural and subdural abscesses on October 5, 1927.

In January 1929, Basquette married cinematographer Peverell Marley. Shortly after the marriage, Harry Warner, Sam Warner's older brother, asked Basquette give up custody of her daughter Lita. He was concerned that she would raise Lita as a Roman Catholic like her rather than in the Jewish faith. Basquette said that she and Sam Warner had agreed to raise any female children they had as Catholic and any male children as Jewish. Harry Warner and his wife offered Basquette large amounts of money to relinquish custody but she refused. She finally relented after Harry Warner promised her that Lita would receive a $300,000 trust fund. On March 30, 1930, Harry Warner and his wife were awarded legal custody of Lita. Basquette quickly regretted her decision and tried to regain custody of her daughter.

In August 1930, Basquette left Marley as she tried to regain custody of Lita. When custody was denied, she attempted suicide by drinking poison at a party. She was saved when a guest heard her screams. Marley and Basquette were divorced in September 1930.

Basquette was never financially stable enough to regain custody of her daughter. The Warner family filed several legal suits against her to win back Sam Warner's share of Warner Bros. studio. Over the next 20 years, Basquette saw Lita on only two occasions: in 1935, when Harry Warner and his family moved to Los Angeles, and in 1947, when Lita married Dr. Nathan Hiatt. Basquette and her daughter reconnected in 1977 when Basquette backed a lawsuit that Lita brought against her uncle Jack L. Warner's estate.

Basquette's third marriage was to actor Ray Hallam in 1931. He died of leukemia three weeks after they were married. On October 31, 1931, she married Theodore Hayes, the former trainer of world heavyweight boxing champion Jack Dempsey. After discovering that Hayes was still married to another woman, Basquette was granted a Mexican divorce on September 10, 1932.

In her autobiography, Basquette said that, while she and Hayes were separated, she had an affair with Jack Dempsey. Dempsey ended the affair in July 1932 after which Basquette attempted suicide a second time. She and Hayes eventually reconciled and remarried in 1934. They had a son, Edward Alvin Hayes, in April 1934. The following year, they divorced in December 1935.

In April 1937, Basquette married British actor Henry Mollison in London. They separated in 1940, and divorced in October 1944.

In 1947, she married Warner Gilmore, the general manager of the St. Moritz Hotel. They divorced in 1951. Basquette's final marriage was to artist Frank Mancuso. They married in 1959 and separated that same year, but they were never divorced.

== Death ==
On September 30, 1994, Basquette died of lymphoma at her home in Wheeling, West Virginia, at the age of 87.

== Legacy ==
For her contributions to the film industry, Basquette has a star on the Hollywood Walk of Fame located at 1529 Vine Street.

== Filmography ==
Short subject
Year	Title	Role	Notes
1916	Juvenile Dancer		
1916	The Dumb Girl of Portici	Child	Uncredited
1916	Brother Jim	Margie Marsh	Credited as Lena Basquette
1916	The Grip of Crime		Credited as Lena Basquette
1916	Shoes	Undetermined role	Uncredited
1916	The Human Cactus		Credited as Lena Basquette
1916	The Caravan		Credited as Lena Basquette
1917	Polly Put the Kettle On	Nellie Vance	
1917	His Wife's Relatives		
1917	The Gates of Doom	Agatha as a child	
1917	The Star Witness		Credited as Lena Basquette
1917	A Dream of Egypt		Credited as Lena Basquette
1917	A Romany Rose		Credited as Lena Basquette
1917	A Prince for a Day		Credited as Lena Basquette
1917	Little Mariana's Triumph		Credited as Lena Basquette
1919	The Weaker Vessel	Jessie	

Features
Year	Title	Role	Notes
1922	Penrod		Uncredited; Lost film
1927	Ranger of the North	Felice MacLean	
1927	Serenade	The Dancer	Lost film
1928	The Noose	Dot	
1928	Wheel of Chance	Ada Berkowitz	Lost film
1928	Celebrity	Jane	
1928	Show Folks	Rita Carey	
1929	The Godless Girl	Judy Craig - The Girl	
1929	Come Across	Mary Houston	
1929	The Younger Generation	Birdie Goldfish	
1930	The Dude Wrangler	Helen Dane	Alternative title: Feminine Touch
1931	Goldie	Constantina	
1931	Pleasure	Helen	
1931	Arizona Terror	Katherine "Kay" Moore	
1931	Hard Hombre	Senora Martini	
1931	Morals for Women	Claudia	Alternative titles: Big City Interlude; Farewell Party
1931	Trapped	Girl Reporter	Alternative title: The Shadow #2: Trapped
1931	Mounted Fury	Nanette LeStrange	
1932	The Arm of the Law	Zelma Shaw, a Dancer	
1932	The Midnight Lady	Mona	Alternative title: Dream Mother
1932	Hello Trouble	Janet Kenyon	
1932	The Phantom Express	Betty	
1934	The Chump		
1936	The Final Hour	Belle	
1937	Souls at Sea	Brunette in Saloon	Uncredited
1937	Ebb Tide	Attwater's Servant	
1938	The Buccaneer	Roxanne	Uncredited
1938	Rose of the Rio Grande	Anita	
1938	Four Men and a Prayer	Ah-Nee	
1942	Who Calls		
1943	A Night for Crime	Mona	
1991	Paradise Park	Nada	Alternative title: Heroes of the Heart
