= My Four Years in Germany =

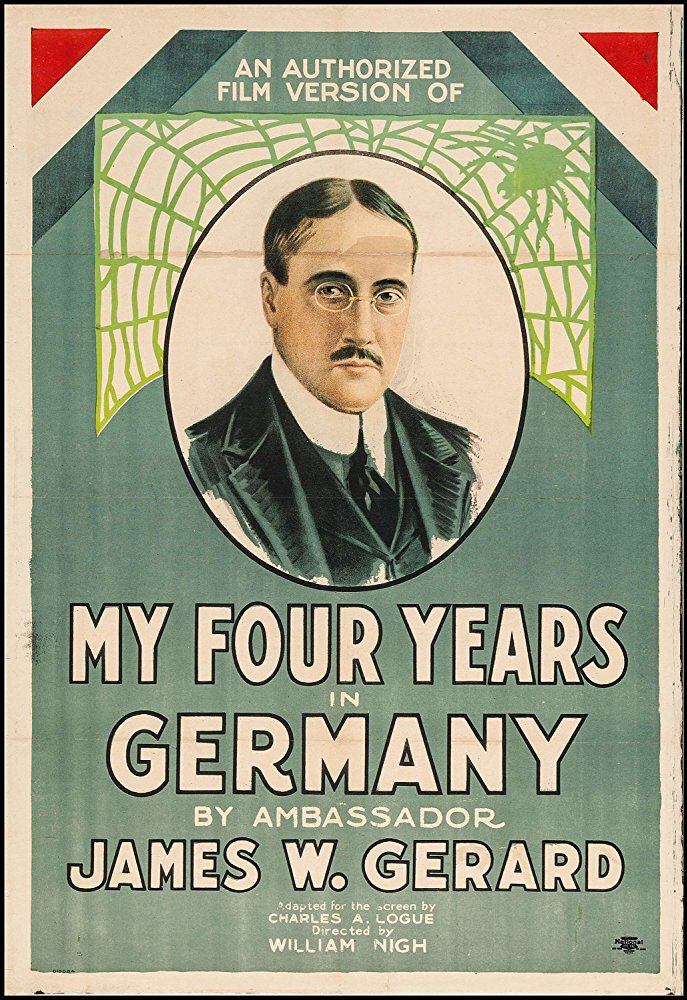
- Theatrical release poster
- Directed by: William Nigh; Clifford P. Saum (assist. director)
- Written by: Charles A. Logue
- Based on: My Four Years in Germany by James W. Gerard
- Produced by: Harry Warner; Albert Warner; Sam Warner; Jack L. Warner; Mark Dintenfass
- Starring: Halbert Brown
- Cinematography: Rial B. Schellinger
- Edited by: William Nigh
- Production companies: My Four Years in Germany Pictures, Inc. Warner Brothers
- Distributed by: First National Exhibitors' Circuit, Inc.
- Release dates: March 10, 1918 (New York City); April 29, 1918
- Running time: 108 minutes (10 reels)
- Country: United States
- Language: Silent (English intertitles)

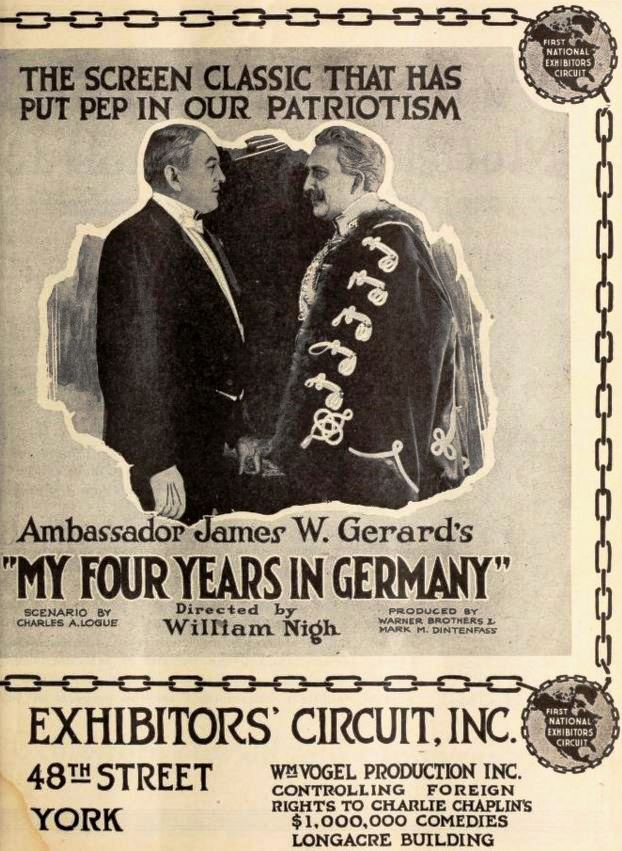
Advertisement for film.

My Four Years in Germany is a 1918 American silent war drama film directed by William Nigh, based on the experiences of real life U. S. Ambassador to Germany James W. Gerard as described in his book. It is notable as being the first film produced by the four Warner Brothers, Harry, Sam, Albert and Jack, although the title card clearly reads "My Four Years In Germany Inc. Presents ...". The film was produced during the height of World War I and is generally considered a prime example of war propaganda.

== Cast ==
- Halbert Brown as Ambassador James W. Gerard
- Willard Dashiell as Sir Edward Goschen
- Louis Dean as Kaiser Wilhelm II
- Earl Schenck as Crown Prince of Germany
- George Riddell as Field Marshal von Hindenburg
- Frank Stone as Prince Henry of Prussia
- Karl Dane as Chancellor von Bethmann-Hollweg
- Fred Hern as Foreign Minister von Jagow
- Percy Standing as Under-Secretary Zimmermann
- William Bittner as Grand Admiral von Tirpitz
- Arthur C. Duvel as Field Marshal von Falkenhayn
- Ann Dearing as Aimee Delaporte
- A. B. Conkwright as Socialist
- William Nigh as Socialist

== Reception ==
Like many American films of the time, My Four Years in Germany was subject to cuts by city and state film censorship boards. For example, the Chicago Board of Censors required cuts, in Reel 7, of the intertitle "Do you know where will be quarted tonight?", two scenes of officer entering cabin into which young woman runs and his exit, scene of young woman lying in bed with clothing disarranged after her criminal assault, scene of dead woman on ground, Reel 8, the intertitle "The first night we were quartered with the soldiers", and, Reel 10, scene of man drawing sword out of other man's body. The Chicago board's cuts totaled twenty feet of film.

== Preservation ==
A copy of My Four Years in Germany is held in the Turner Entertainment film library.
