= Albert Warner =

American film executive (1884–1967)

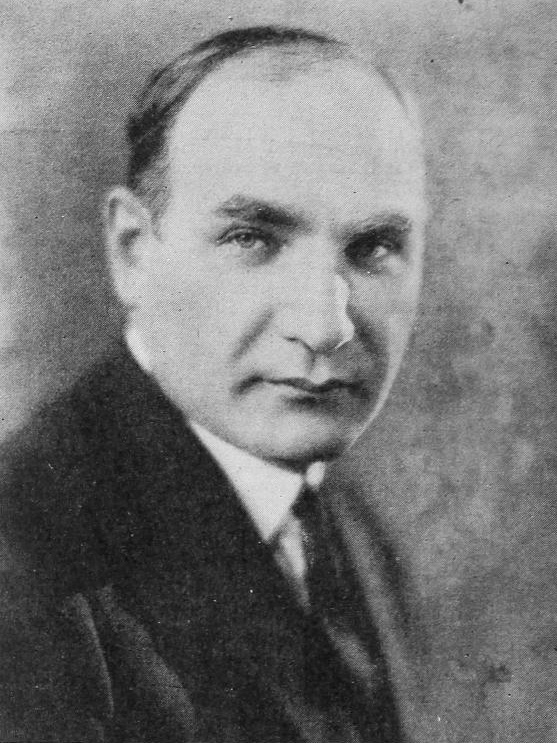
- Born: Aaron Abraham Wonsal; July 23, 1884; Krasnosielc, Congress Poland, Russian Empire
- Died: November 26, 1967 (aged 83); Miami Beach, Florida, U.S.
- Occupations: Film executive Co-founder of Warner Brothers
- Years active: 1903–1956
- Spouses: Bessie Krieger (m. 1908; died 1924) Bessie Siegal (m. 1925)
- Relatives: Brothers Harry, Sam, and Jack L. Warner

Albert Warner (born Aaron Abraham Wonsal, July 23, 1884 – November 26, 1967) was an American film executive who was one of the founders of Warner Bros. Pictures, Inc. He established the production studio with his brothers Harry, Sam, and Jack L. Warner. He served as the studio's treasurer until he sold his stock in 1956.

== Early years ==
Aaron Abraham Wonsal was born in the village of Krasnosielc, Poland (then part of Congress Poland within the Russian Empire). He was the son of Benjamin Wonsal, a shoemaker born in Krasnosielc, and Pearl Leah Eichelbaum, both Polish Jews. He came to Baltimore, Maryland with his mother and siblings in October 1889 on the steamship Hermann from Bremen, Germany. Their father had preceded them, immigrating to Baltimore in 1888 and following his trade in shoes and shoe repair. He changed the family name to Warner, which was used thereafter. As in many Jewish immigrant families, some of the children gradually acquired anglicized versions of their Yiddish-sounding names. Aaron and Jacob were late among the children to do so, becoming "Albert" and "Jack" after they came of age. However, his nickname was "Abe."

In Baltimore, the money Benjamin Warner earned in the shoe repair business was not enough to provide for his growing household. He and Pearl had another daughter, Fannie, not long after they arrived. Benjamin moved the family to Canada, inspired by a friend's advice that he could make an excellent living bartering tin wares with trappers in exchange for furs. Sons Jacob and David Warner were born in London, Ontario. After two arduous years in Canada, Benjamin and Pearl Warner returned to Baltimore, bringing along their growing family. Two more children, Sadie and Milton, were added to the household there. In 1896, the family relocated to Youngstown, Ohio, following the lead of Harry Warner, who established a shoe repair shop in the heart of the emerging industrial town. Benjamin worked with his son Harry in the shoe repair shop until he secured a loan to open a meat counter and grocery store in the city's downtown area.

In the late 1890s, Albert became fascinated by the bicycle craze that swept through the USA. and his older brother Harry opened a bicycle shop in Youngstown together as well. The two also tried to open a bowling alley together, but were unsuccessful.

Albert Warner stayed in school longer than any of his three brothers. In 1900, Warner entered Youngstown's Rayen High School, where he served as quarterback for the school's football team. Warner eventually dropped out, and in time got a job in Chicago as a salesman for the soap company Swift and Company. Warner's life would soon pursue a new direction after brother Sam was able to purchase a Kinetoscope in 1903.

== Film career ==
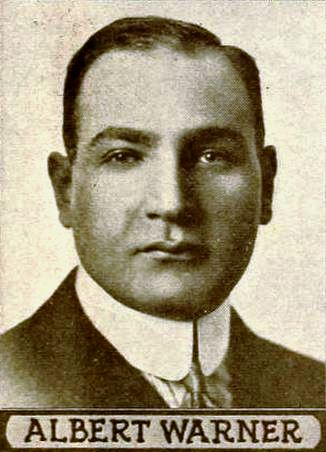
Albert Warner (1919)

As a young man, along with his brother Sam, Albert Warner entered the nickelodeon business, and started displaying copies of The Great Train Robbery from a Kinetoscope at carnivals in Ohio and Pennsylvania in 1903; Sam ran the projector and Albert sold tickets. In 1905, Harry agreed to join his two brothers' business and sold his Youngstown bicycle shop. During this time the three brothers purchased a building in New Castle, Pennsylvania; with their new building, the brothers established their first theater, The Cascade Movie Palace. The theater was so successful that the brothers were able to purchase a second theater in New Castle. This makeshift affair, called the Bijou, was furnished with chairs borrowed from a local undertaker. In 1907 the three brothers acquired fifteen additional theaters in the state of Pennsylvania, and named their new business The Dusquesne Amusement Supply Company. The three brothers then rented an office in the Bakewell building in downtown Pittsburgh with a loan from Max Fleischer. Harry then sent Sam to New York to purchase and ship films for their Pittsburgh exchange company, while he and Albert remained in Pittsburgh to run the business.

In 1909, the brothers sold the Cascade Theater to open a second film exchange company in Norfolk, Virginia, drawing youngest brother Jack into the fold. Afterwards, Sam and Jack went to Norfolk, while Harry and Albert stayed in Pittsburgh. However, one serious threat to the Warners film company was the advent of Thomas Edison's Motion Picture Patents Company (also known as the Edison Trust), which enforced Edison's patents and charged distributors exorbitant fees. In 1910 the Warners sold the family business to the General Film Company for "$10,000 in cash, $12,000 in preferred stock, and $30,000 in payments over a four-year period, for a total of $52,000". After selling their business the brothers found work distributing films for Carl Laemmle's Independent Motion Picture Company in Pittsburgh. In 1912 Sam would help the brothers earn a $1,500 profit by distributing the Italian film Dante's Inferno in the United States. Harry, encouraged by the success of Dante's Inferno and wary of Edison's growing monopoly, decided to leave Laemmle and establish an independent film production company for the four Warner brothers, Warner Features; Albert and Harry opened an office in New York, while Sam was sent to operate the company's new Los Angeles film exchange division, and Jack was sent to run the company's new San Francisco film exchange division. In 1918, thanks in part to a loan from Ambassador James W. Gerald, the brothers expanded operations and established a studio near Hollywood, California Sam and Jack moved to the West Coast to produce films while Albert and Harry remained on the East Coast to handle distribution.

Between the years 1919 and 1920 the studio was not able to earn any profits. During this time banker Motley Flint helped the Warners pay off their debts. Shortly afterwards the four brothers decided to relocate their studio from Culver City to Sunset Boulevard. The studio rebounded in 1921, after the success of the studio's film Why Girls Leave Home. As a result of the financial success of the film, its director, Harry Rapf, was appointed the studio's new head producer. On April 4, 1923, following the studio's successful film The Gold Diggers, Warner Bros. Pictures, Inc. was officially established. Albert remained in New York, where he ran the company's distribution and finances.

== Warner Bros. Pictures, Inc. ==
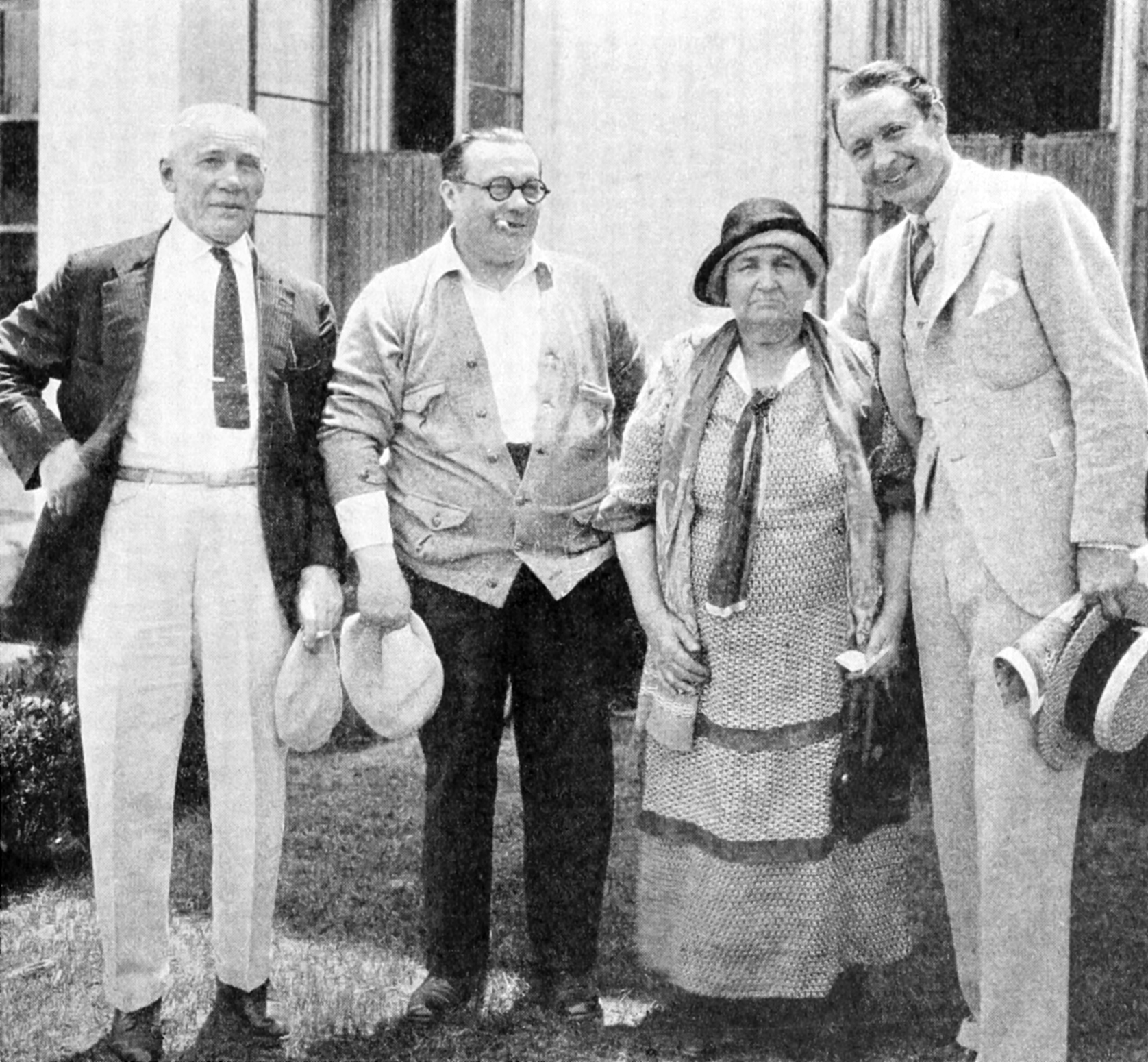
Benjamin and Pearl Warner, parents of the Warner brothers, were photographed with Warner Bros. actors Monte Blue (right) and Willard Louis (second from left) during a 1926 visit to their sons' West Coast studio.

Warner Bros' first film, Where the North Begins, brought success for the brothers not seen since My Four Years in Germany. The film also made the dog Rin Tin Tin the studio's first star. Newcomer director Darryl Zanuck's career was also greatly boosted through his productions of Rin Tin Tin. Zanuck would eventually become a top producer for the studio as well, and between 1928 and 1933 served as Jack Warner's right-hand man and executive producer, a position whose responsibilities included the day-to-day production of films. After establishing Warner Bros. Pictures the studio had overdrawn $1,000,000 (the amount which Warner had borrowed from Flint). At this, Albert convinced Harry not to purchase the screenrights to the hit play Rain. Harry then decided to help ease the company's financial status by acquiring forty theaters in the state of Pennsylvania.

More success would come for the studio after the brothers hired German director Ernst Lubitsch as head director; Rapf had departed the studio and accepted an offer to work at MGM. Lubitsch's first film at the studio, The Marriage Circle, became the studio's most successful film of 1924, and was also on the New York Times best list for the year. The studio's 1924 film Beau Brummel also made John Barrymore a top star at the studio. Despite the success the brothers now had they still could not compete with the "big three" studios (First National, Paramount, and MGM)

In 1925, Albert's older brother Harry and a large group of independent film-makers assembled in Milwaukee, Wisconsin, to challenge the monopoly the big three had over the film industry. Harry and the other independent film-makers at the Milwaukee convention agreed to spend $500,000 in newspaper advertisements; this action would help benefit Warner Bros. profits. With help from a loan supplied by Goldman, Sachs head banker Waddill Catchings, Warner would find a way to successfully respond to the growing concern the big three studios further presented to Warner Bros., and expanded the company's operations by purchasing the Brooklyn theater company Vitagraph. Through this purchase, the Warners then had theaters in the New York area.

In 1925 Sam Warner had also acquired a radio station, KWBC. After this, Sam decided to make an attempt to use synchronized sound in future Warner Bros. pictures. However, Harry Warner had initial reservations about the idea, in which he is quoted as saying "Who the hell wants to hear actors talk?" when his brother, Sam Warner proposed the idea to him. Under Warner and his brothers’ leadership, the company came to own and operate some 250 theaters to screen its films, and was a successful pioneer of the sound film industry. However, by February 1926 the brothers' radio business had failed, and the studio suffered a net loss of $333,413.

After a period of refusing to accept sound in the company's films, Harry Warner now agreed to use synchronized sound in Warner Bros. shorts for usage of background music, Harry then made a visit to Western Electric's Bell Laboratories in New York (which his younger brother Sam had earlier visited) and was impressed. A problem for the Warners was that the high-ups at Western Electric were perceived as anti-Semitic. Sam was able to convince the high-ups to sign with the studio after his wife Lina wore a gold cross at a dinner he attended with Western Electric. Afterwards, Harry signed a partnership agreement with Western Electric to use Bell Labs to test the sound-on-film process.

After the agreement was signed Vitaphone was established, and Sam and Jack decided to take a big step forward make Don Juan. The film began with eight Vitaphone features filmed in sound. Despite the success it had at the box office, the film was not able to recoup its expensive budget. Harry was now further convinced not to use any more sound in Warner Bros. pictures.

With Harry now refusing to allow further Vitaphone productions, Paramount head Adolph Zukor took advantage of the situation and tried to offer Sam a deal as an executive producer for his studio if he brought Vitaphone with him. Sam easily accepted Zukor's offer, but the offer died after Paramount lost money in the wake of Rudolph Valentino's death in late 1926. By April 1927, the Big Five studios (First National, Paramount, MGM, Universal, and Producers Distributing) had put the Warners in financial ruin, and Western Electric renewed the Warner's Vitaphone contract on non-exclusive terms that allowed other film company's to test sound with the company; the Warners were even forced to sell some of their stock to Harry Cohn, the head of the independent film company Columbia Pictures. Eventually, Harry agreed to accept Sam's demands to continue with Vitaphone productions, and the studio soon began production of the first talkie, The Jazz Singer; soon after its release, the film would indeed help establish the Warners as, arguably the three most important figures in the film industry. On October 5, 1927, Sam would die and younger brother Jack was given charge of the studio's production, despite the fact that Jack still did not have as much power over the studio as Harry did, as he was only the studio's vice president.

=== Kings of the talking screen ===
With the success of the Jazz Singer, more talkies followed. With the large sums of money the Warners now had on-hand, Harry was able to expand business operations further, acquiring the Stanley Corporation for the studio. This gave them a share in rival First National Pictures, of which Stanley owned one-third. After this purchase, Warner was soon able to acquire William Fox's one third remaining share in First National and was now officially the majority stockholder of the company. Harry, after purchasing a string of music publishers, established a music subsidiary-Warner Bros. Music- bought out additional radio companies, acquired foreign sound patents, and purchased a lithograph company. In 1929, with the large amount of money he now had made off of the studio's valuable subsidiaries, Albert acquired a large home in Rye, Westchester County, New York, which he dubbed "Caradel Hall."

== The Great Depression ==
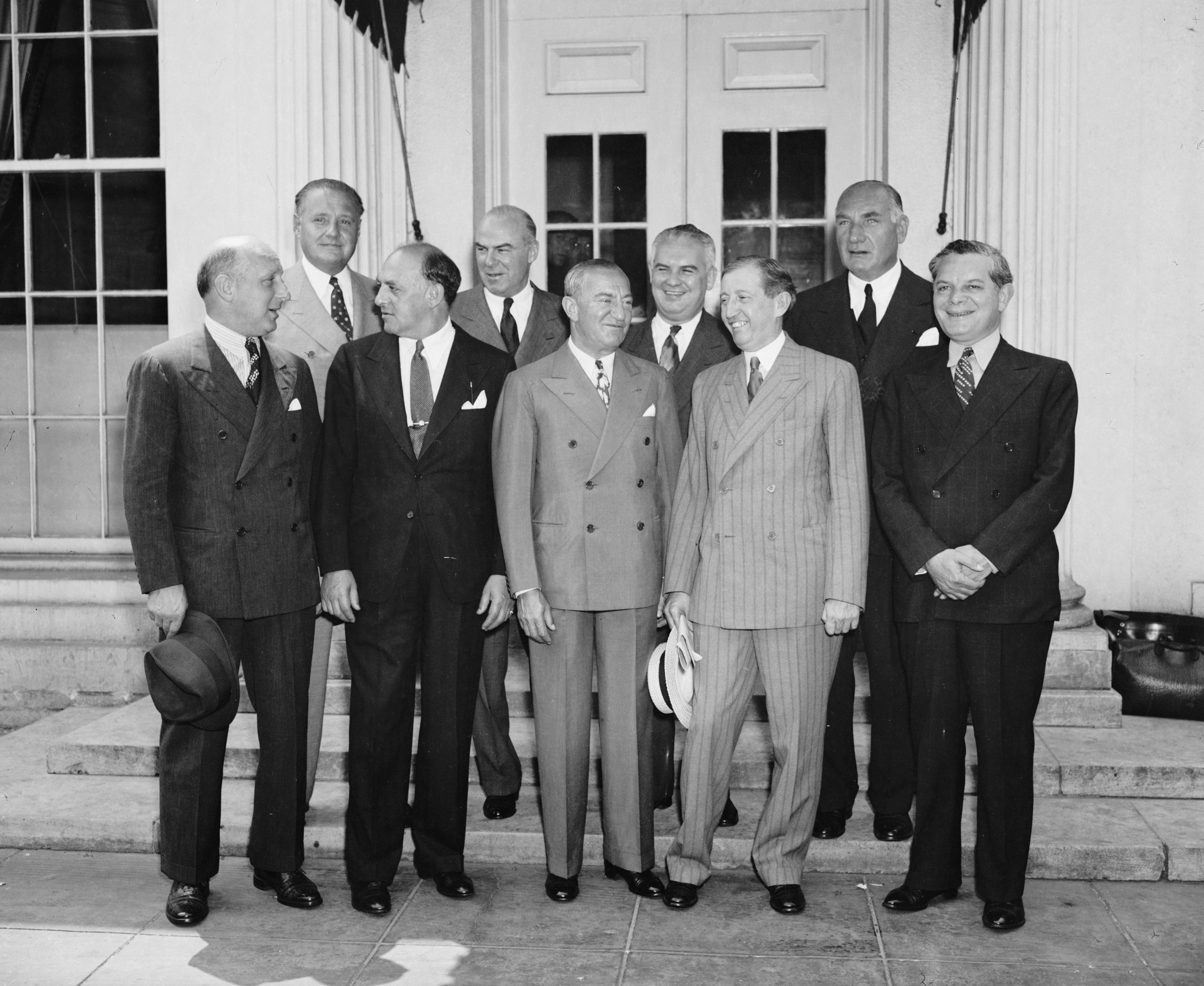
At the White House, Front row, left to right: Barney Balaban, Paramount; Harry Cohn, Columbia Pictures; Nicholas M. Schenck, Lowe's; Will H. Hays, and Leo Spitz, RKO. Back row: George J. Schaefer, United Artists; Sidney Kent, 20th Century Fox; N.J. Blumberg, Universal; and Albert Warner, Warner Bros. in 1938

With the Wall Street crash of 1929 officially marking the beginning of the Great Depression, Albert saw that the studio was in need of additional star power in order to survive. Following Albert's advice, Jack and Harry Warner acquired three Paramount stars (William Powell, Kay Francis, and Ruth Chatterton) for studio salaries doubled from their previous ones. This move proved to be a success, and stockholders maintained confident in the Warners. In late 1929, Jack Warner would hire sixty-one-year-old actor George Arliss to star in the studio's film Disraeli. To everybody's surprise, the film Disraeli was a success, and Arliss would win an Oscar for Best Actor for his role in the film and star in nine more films with the studio as well.

Following the decline of the musical market, Warner Bros. under production head Darryl F. Zanuck shifted toward gritty, realistic narratives often inspired by contemporary crime reports. This shift earned the studio the nickname 'the gangster studio. The commercial success of Little Caesar established Edward G. Robinson as a leading figure in the genre.

Another gangster film the studio produced was the critically acclaimed I Am a Fugitive From a Chain Gang, starring Paul Muni. In addition to Cagney and Robinson, Paul Muni was also given a big push as one of the studio's top gangster stars after appearing in the successful film I Am a Fugitive From a Chain Gang. The film got audiences in the United States to question the legal system in the United States, and by January 1933, the film's protagonist Robert Elliott Burns – who was still imprisoned in New Jersey – and a number of different chain gang prisoners nationwide in the United States were able to appeal and were released. In January 1933, Georgia chain gang warden J Harold Hardy – who was also made into a character in the film – sued the studio for displaying "vicious, untrue and false attacks" against him in the film. After appearing in the film The Man Who Played God, Bette Davis would also become a top star for the studio as well. In 1933, the studio's very successful film 42nd Street would revive the studio's musicals Most these new musicals featured Ruby Keeler and Dick Powell as the stars, and were mostly directed by Busby Berkeley.

By 1931, however, the studio would begin to feel the effects of the Depression as the general public became unable to afford the price for movie tickets. In 1931, the studio would reportedly suffer a net loss of $8,000,000.00. The following year, the studio would suffer an additional $14,000,000.00 net loss as well.

In 1933, relief for the studio came after Franklin Roosevelt became US president in 1933 and US economy rebounded due to the New Deal; because of this economic rebound, box office profits for Warner Bros. existed once again. However, this same year, the studio's long time head producer Darryl F. Zanuck quit, because: 1) Harry Warner's relationship with Zanuck became strained after Harry was strongly against allowing Zanuck film Baby Face to step outside the Hays Code boundaries; and 2) the studio reduced Zanuck's salary as a result of the financial woes the Great Depression gave the studio's net profits, and Harry still refused to raise his salary in the wake of the New Deal's rebound. Zanuck produced his letter of resignation to Jack Warner, and went on to establish his own company. In the wake of Zanuck's resignation, Harry Warner agreed to again raise the salary for the studio's employees.

In 1933, the studio was also able to bring newspaper tycoon William Randolph Hearst's Cosmopolitan films into the Warner Bros. fold. Hearst had previously been signed with MGM, but he ended his ties with the company after a dispute with the company's head producer Irving Thalberg over the treatment of Marion Davies; Davies was a longtime mistress of Hearst, and was now struggling to draw box office success. Through the studios partnership with Hearst, Harry's younger brother Jack was also able to sign Davies to a studio contract as well. Hearst's company and Davies' films, however, could not increase the studio's net profits. In 1934, Warner officially purchased the Teddington Studio as well.

In 1934, the studio would suffer a net loss of over $2,500,000.00. $500,000 of this loss was also the result of physical damage to the Warner Bros. Burbank studio that occurred after a massive fire that broke out in the studio around the end of 1934, and destroyed twenty years worth of early Warner Bros. films. The following year, Hearst's film adaption of William Shakespeare's A Midsummer Night's Dream would fail at the box office and the studio net loss increased. During the year 1935, the studio's revived musicals would also suffer a major blow after director Busby Berkeley was arrested after killing three people while driving drunk one night. By the end of the 1935, however, relief would come for the Warners, as the studio would rebound with a year-end net profit of $674,158.00.

== Post war era ==
On November 25, 1947, Albert Warner and other executives in the motion picture industry issued the Waldorf Statement, first promulgating the Hollywood Blacklist. Around this time, Albert also bought a second mansion in Miami Beach, Florida, where he lived for most of the remaining years of his life. By 1956, the studio was losing money and Albert wanted to retire and live full-time in his Miami Beach house.

In May 1956, the brothers announced they were putting Warner Bros. on the market. Jack, however, secretly organized a syndicate headed by Boston banker Serge Semenenko that purchased 90% (800,000 shares) of the company's stock. After the three brothers sold their stock, in an under-the-table deal with Semenenko, Jack officially joined Semenenko's syndicate and bought back all his stock, which consisted of 200,000 shares. The deal officially completed in July. Now the company's largest stockholder, Jack appointed himself as the new company president. By the time Harry and Albert learned of their brother's subterfuge, it was too late.

Albert read about Jack's dealings while spending time in New York City. He never spoke to Jack again, but he did later rejoin the company's board of directors to stop Jack "from stealing the stockholders blind".

Albert Warner died of a stroke in 1967 in Miami Beach. A funeral service was held in Los Angeles. Warner was then interred in Brooklyn, next to his first wife Bessie Krieger. After Albert's second wife Bessie Warner died in 1970 she was interred with him as well in Brooklyn.

== Personal life ==
In 1908, Warner married Bessie Krieger, in New Castle, Pennsylvania. Krieger died in 1923 from influenza. On April 23, 1925, Warner married Bessie Siegal, the widow of his friend, Jonas Siegal. The couple remained married until Warner's death in 1967. Through his marriage to Bessie Siegel, Warner had a stepson, Arthur Jack Steel, who married Ruth Mandel, and had sons John and Lewis Steel (named after Harry Warner's son Lewis Warner). Warner was noted as never adopting an upper class lifestyle, remaining unrefined throughout his life.

== Thoroughbred racing ==
Like his brother Harry, Albert too would be a fan of Thoroughbred racing and beginning in the 1930s owned horses he raced under the name Warbern Stable and later under the nom de course, Warner Stable. In March 1945 Warner purchased Elberton Hill Farm in Harford County, Maryland from G. Ray Bryson and his wife, Ella K. Bryson. The property was used for his East Coast racing operations under the management of trainer A. G. "Bob" Robertson.

Among Warner's best horses, Native Charger won the 1965 Flamingo Stakes and the Florida Derby that sent him on the road to the Kentucky Derby, in which he finished fourth to winner Lucky Debonair.

== Bibliography ==
- Krakowski, Andrzej (2011). Pollywood: jak stworzyliśmy Hollywood (Pollywood. How we created Hollywood). Wydawnictwo Naukowe PWN. ISBN 978-0-7432-0481-1.
- Sperling, Cass Warner; Cork Milner; Jack Warner Jr. (1998). Hollywood Be Thy Name: The Warner Brothers Story. University Press of Kentucky. ISBN 0-8131-0958-2.
- Thomas, Bob (1990). Clown Prince of Hollywood: The Antic Life and Times of Jack L. Warner. McGraw-Hill Publishing Company. ISBN 0-07-064259-1.
- Warner, Jack L.; Dean Jennings (1964). My First Hundred Years in Hollywood. Random Books. ASIN: B0007DZSKW.
