= Hello Trouble (1932 film) =

1932 film by Lambert Hillyer

- Directed by: Lambert Hillyer
- Written by: Lambert Hillyer
- Starring: Buck Jones; Lina Basquette
- Cinematography: Benjamin Kline
- Edited by: Gene Milford
- Production company: Columbia Pictures Corporation
- Distributed by: Columbia Pictures Corporation
- Release date: July 15, 1932
- Running time: 63 minutes
- Country: United States
- Language: English

Hello Trouble is a 1932 American pre-Code Western movie directed by Lambert Hillyer. The film stars Buck Jones and Lina Basquette.

== Cast ==
- Buck Jones as Ranger Jeff Douglas
- Lina Basquette as Janet Kenyon
- Wallace Macdonald as Le Tange
- Spee O'Donnell as Joey
- Ruth Warren as Emmy
- Otto Hoffman as Calvin Sharp
- Ward Bond as Kennedy
- Frank Rice as Hardpan
- Russell Simpson as Jonathan Kenyon
- Alan Roscoe as Gregg
- Morgan Galloway as Johnny Boyle
- Lafe Mckee as Sheriff Edwards
- Al Smith as Vaughn
