= The Younger Generation =

1929 film by Frank Capra

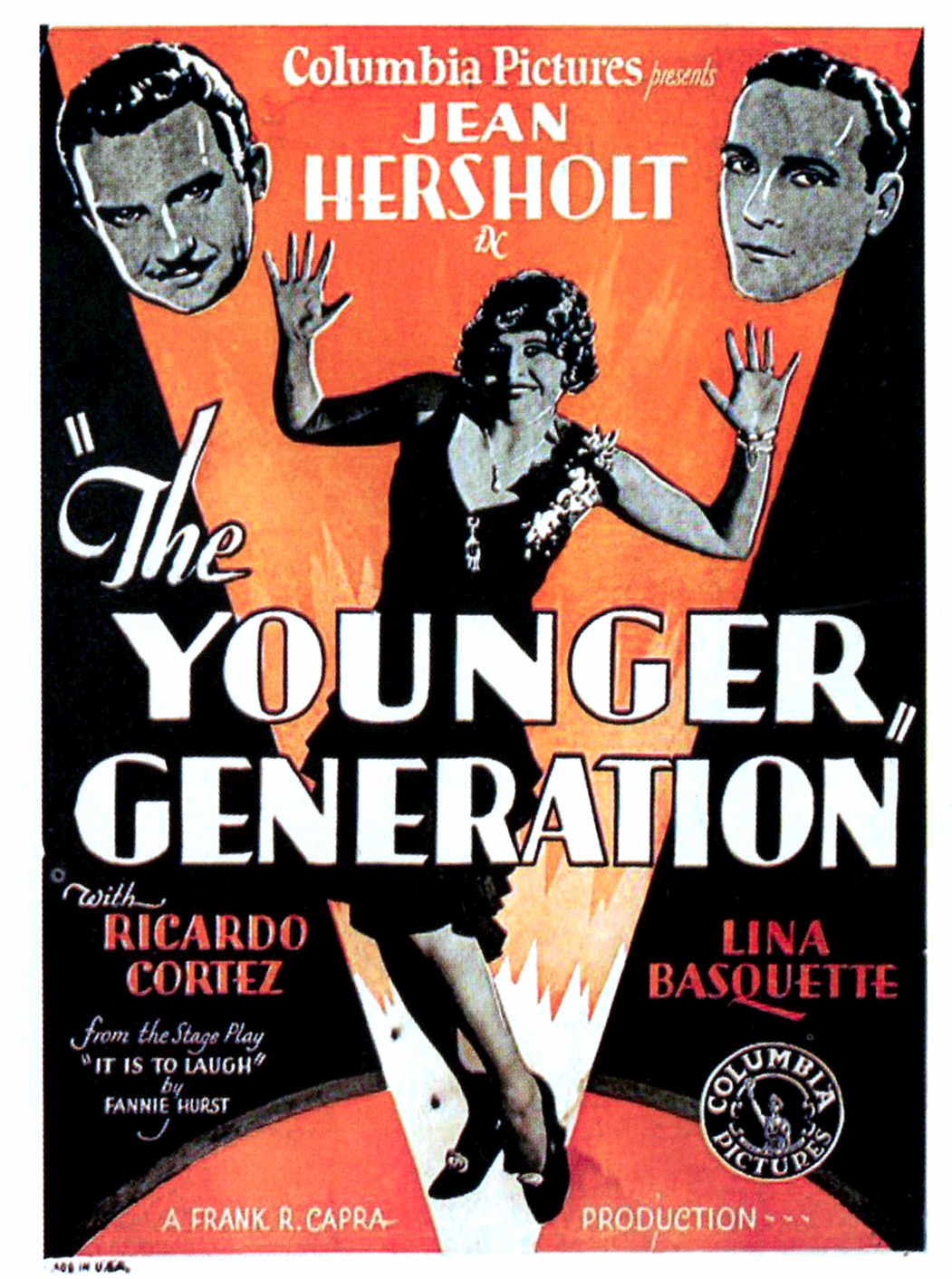
- Film poster
- Directed by: Frank Capra
- Written by: Howard J. Green (dialogue); Sonya Levien
- Based on: It Is to Laugh by Fannie Hurst
- Produced by: Jack Cohn
- Starring: Jean Hersholt; Ricardo Cortez; Lina Basquette
- Cinematography: Ted Tetzlaff
- Edited by: Arthur Roberts
- Music by: Mischa Bakaleinikoff
- Production company: Columbia Pictures
- Distributed by: Columbia Pictures
- Release date: March 4, 1929
- Running time: 75 minutes; 84 minutes (Turner Classic Movies print)
- Country: United States
- Languages: Sound (part-talkie); English intertitles

The Younger Generation is a 1929 sound part-talkie American drama film directed by Frank Capra and starring Ricardo Cortez. In addition to sequences with audible dialogue or talking sequences, the film features a synchronized musical score and sound effects along with English intertitles. The soundtrack was recorded using the Western Electric sound-on-film system. The film was produced by Jack Cohn for Columbia Pictures. It was Capra's first sound film. The screenplay was adapted from a 1927 Fannie Hurst play, It Is to Laugh.

== Plot ==
The Younger Generation (1929)

The child of Jewish immigrants, Morris Goldfish finds success as an art dealer. He moves his family to Fifth Avenue and changes his name to Maurice Fish. There, he finds his family to be damaging to his social status. In the end he finds that there is more to life than money.

== Cast ==
- Jean Hersholt as Julius (Pa) Goldfish
- Lina Basquette as Birdie Goldfish
- Ricardo Cortez as Morris Goldfish
- Rex Lease as Eddie Lesser
- Rosa Rosanova as Tilda (Ma) Goldfish
- Syd Crossley as Goldfish's Butler
- Joe Bordeaux as Crook (uncredited)
- Ferike Boros as Delancey Street Woman (uncredited)
- Clarence Burton as Police Desk Sergeant (uncredited)
- Paul Ellis as Crook (uncredited)
- Otto Fries as Tradesman (uncredited)
- Julia Swayne Gordon as Mrs. Striker (uncredited)
- Donald Hall as Minor Role (uncredited)
- Leon Janney as Eddie Lesser as a Boy (uncredited)
- Julanne Johnston as Irma Striker (uncredited)
- Virginia Marshall as Birdie Goldfish as a girl (uncredited)
- Jack Raymond as Pinsky (uncredited)
- Bernard Siegel as Minor Role (uncredited)

== Music ==
The film featured two theme songs. The first is entitled "A Bird Flew Into My Heart" and was composed by Lou Herscher. The second theme song is entitled "Because You Flew Away" and was composed by David Prince and Andrew B. Sterling.

== Release ==
=== Home media ===
The film was never given a home media release until Sony Pictures Entertainment issued it in 4K UHD Blu-ray format as part of their limited edition multi-film Frank Capra at Columbia Collection set, which was released on November 19, 2024.

== See also ==
- List of early sound feature films (1926–1929)
