= Warner Bros. =

Brand and corporate history article

Logo used from 2022 until 2026 by Warner Bros. Discovery, the former corporate parent of Warner Bros. Entertainment, which includes the longstanding film and television studios

The logo of Warner Music Group, which has been an independent company since 2004 and the only company still using the "Warner" name currently.

Warner Bros. (Note: Pronounced "Warner Brothers". The abbreviated form is always used in writing, except when referring to the four Warner brothers themselves. It is never read out loud as "Warner Bros" (-BROHZ or similarly); the opening voiceover of The Lego Batman Movie (2017) alludes to this common mistake.) is a brand name that has been used by several multinational mass media and entertainment companies and corporations, mostly based in the United States, originating from the original Warner Bros. Pictures, a major American film studio founded on April 4, 1923.

As of 2026, Skydance owns the motion picture and television assets derived from the original Warner Bros. studio, while the latter's original recorded music arm, Warner Records (formerly known as Warner Bros. Records), now a flagship subsidiary of Warner Music Group, has been independently owned since 2004. Several other former subsidiaries and divisions have been spun off or sold over the years, but they no longer use the Warner name.

== Historical overview ==
The Warner Bros. media conglomerate history began with the original Warner Bros. Pictures, Inc., which was founded on April 4, 1923, by brothers Harry, Albert, Sam, and Jack L. Warner, as a replacement for their previous business, the Warner Features Company, founded in 1910. Jack Warner took full control of the company in 1956. During this time the company expanded into cartoons (and by extension, animation) (Warner Bros. Cartoons), television (Warner Bros. Television Studios), and music publishing (Warner Bros. Music).

Warner Bros. Pictures, Inc., was acquired by Seven Arts Productions in 1967 to form Warner Bros.–Seven Arts. Kinney National Company then purchased Warner Bros.–Seven Arts in 1969 as part of a buying spree that also included National Periodical Publications (predecessor to DC Comics), Television Communications Corporation (predecessor to Time Warner Cable) and Paperback Library (predecessor to Warner Books). After spinning off its non-media assets, Kinney National Company was renamed Warner Communications.

Warner Communications was acquired by Time Inc. in 1990 to form Time Warner. In the mid-2000s, Time Warner spun off or sold several Warner-derived or branded divisions as independent companies, most notably Warner Music Group (which remains independent as of 2026) and Time Warner Cable (later acquired by Charter Communications), while Warner Books was sold to Hachette Livre. During this time, Time Warner's film and television assets were incorporated into a new Warner Bros. Entertainment subsidiary on December 3, 2002.

Time Warner, much reduced in scope at this point, was acquired by AT&T on June 15, 2018, and renamed WarnerMedia. AT&T then spun off and sold WarnerMedia to Discovery, Inc., to form Warner Bros. Discovery on April 8, 2022.

== List of entities derived from Warner Bros. ==
The following entities have used the Warner name and have been derived from or affiliated with the original Warner Bros. Pictures studio.

Top-level corporation:

- Warner Bros. Pictures (1923–1967)
- Warner Bros.–Seven Arts (1967–1969)
- Warner Bros. Entertainment, subsidiary corporation (2002–present)

Film and television studios:

- Warner Bros. Pictures (1969–present)
  - Warner Bros. Pictures Animation (2013–present)
- Warner Bros. Television Studios (1955–present)
  - Warner Bros. Animation (1980–present)
- Warner Bros. Cartoons (1929–1963)

Corporate parents:

- WarnerMedia, previously known as Warner Communications, the first iteration of Time Warner, Time Warner Entertainment, AOL Time Warner, and the second iteration of Time Warner (1972–2022)
- Warner Bros. Discovery (2022–2026)
- Skydance Corporation (2026–present)

Subsidiaries that were spun off:

- Warner Music Group
  - Warner Records, previously known as Warner Bros. Records
  - Warner Chappell Music
- Time Warner Cable
- Time Warner Telecom
- Warner Books
