= The Arm of the Law =

1932 film

- Directed by: Louis King
- Written by: Leon Lee
- Based on: The Butterfly Mystery by Arthur Hoerl
- Produced by: Trem Carr; W. Ray Johnston
- Starring: Rex Bell; Marceline Day; Lina Basquette.
- Cinematography: Archie Stout
- Edited by: Carl Pierson
- Production company: Trem Carr Pictures
- Distributed by: Monogram Pictures
- Release date: April 20, 1932
- Running time: 60 minutes
- Country: United States
- Language: English

The Arm of the Law is a 1932 American pre-Code crime film directed by Louis King and starring Rex Bell, Marceline Day and Lina Basquette. It was distributed by Monogram Pictures.

== Plot ==
A reporter investigates the murder of a nightclub dancer who had become involved in a divorce case.

== Cast ==
- Rex Bell as Robin Dale
- Marceline Day as Sandy
- Lina Basquette as Zelma Shaw
- Dorothy Revier as Mrs. Estelle Brandess
- Bryant Washburn as John Welling
- Donald Keith as Billy Treat
- Robert Frazer as Gregory Brandess
- Robert Emmett O'Connor as Detective Captain Blake
- Dorothy Christy as Mrs. Myrtle Welling
- Larry Banthim as Police Sergeant Jardin
- Gilbert Clayton as Dr. Wattles
- Wallace MacDonald as Newspaper Reporter
- William V. Mong as Bailey
- Fred 'Snowflake' Toones as Jackson
- Gordon De Main as Coroner

== Bibliography ==
- Katchmer, George A. Eighty Silent Film Stars: Biographies and Filmographies of the Obscure to the Well Known. McFarland, 1991.
