= Krasnosielc massacre =

Nazi massacre during the September campaign

- Part of Nazi crimes against the Polish nation
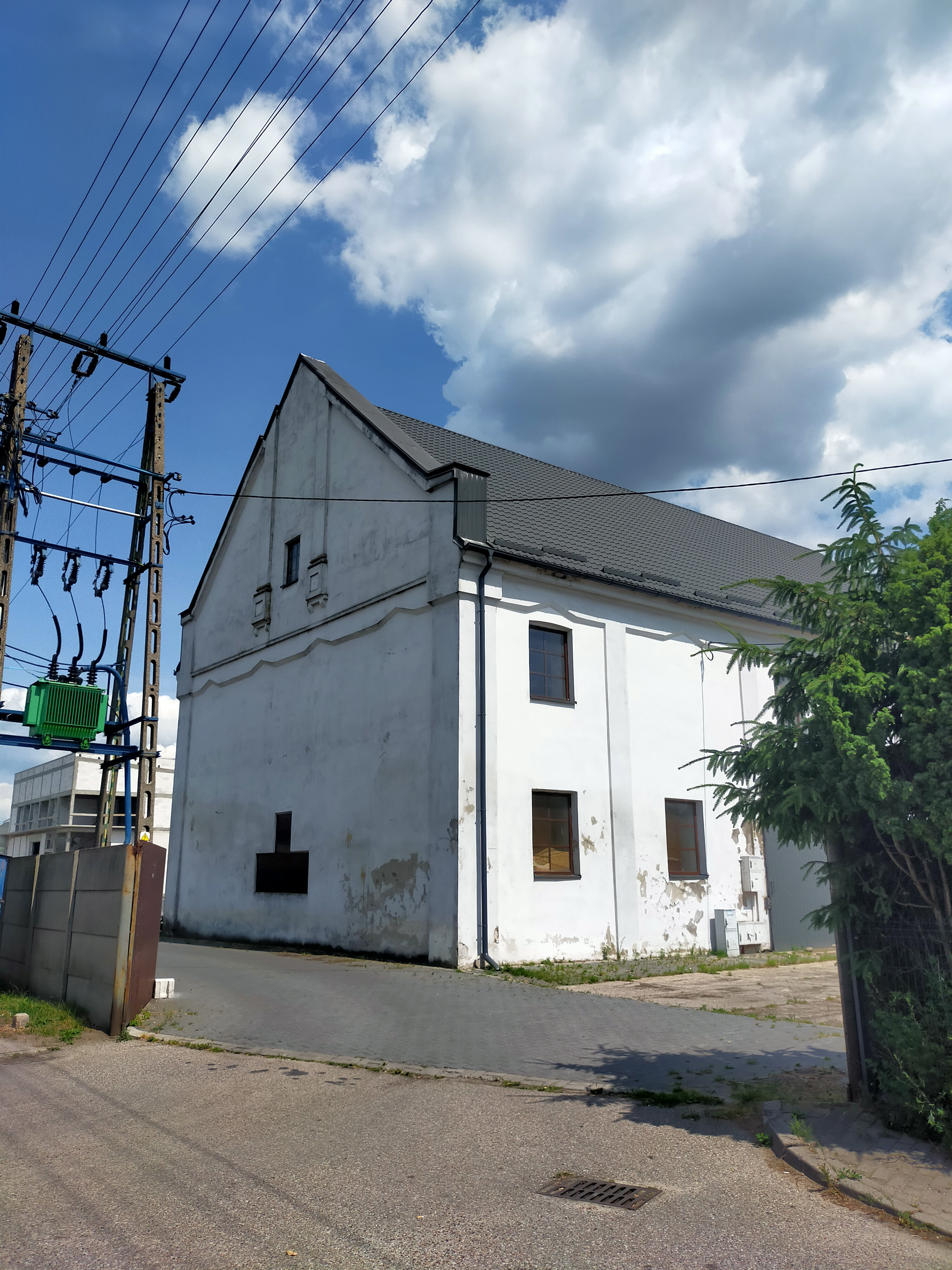
- Synagogue in Krasnosielc where the crime was committed
- Location: Krasnosielc
- Date: 5-6 September 1939
- Attack type: Mass murder
- Victim: c. 50 killed
- Perpetrator: Nazi Germany
- Motive: Invasion of Poland

The Krasnosielc massacre was a war crime committed by the Germans during the September 1939 campaign. It has sometimes been described as the first mass murder of Jews in Poland during WWII. On the night of 5 September 1939, SS and Wehrmacht soldiers herded a group of about 50 Jews into the synagogue in Krasnosielc, who were then shot dead. Although, according to the law then in force in the Third Reich, the massacre in Krasnosielc was arbitrary and unlawful, its perpetrators remained unpunished.

== Prelude ==
Before the outbreak of the World War II, Krasnosielc was home to around 2,000 Jews. After the German invasion began, many of them left their homes and headed towards Warsaw or east. On 4 September 1939, the village was captured by a separate battle group from the Kempf Panzer Division. (Note: The Kempf Panzer Division was an improvised unit. Both members of the SS-Verfügungstruppe and Wehrmacht soldiers served in its ranks.) Retreating Polish forces soldiers blew up the bridge over the Orzyc River. During the night of 4-5 September it was provisionally repaired by German sappers.

== Massacre ==
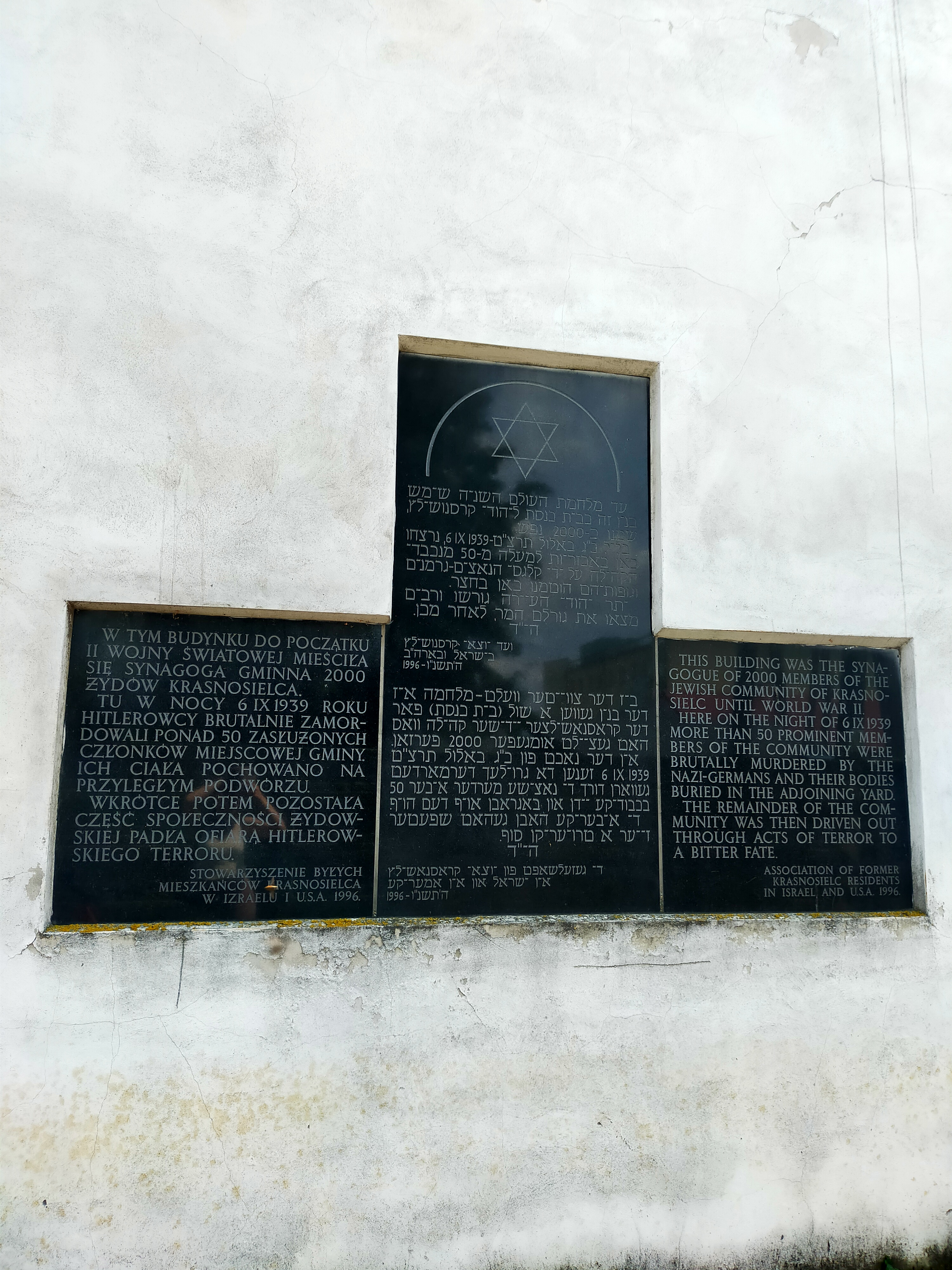
Plaque embedded in the wall of the synagogue in Krasnosielc

On 5 September, soldiers of the Kempf Division organised a large-scale łapanka in Krasnosielc. At that time, several dozen men of Polish and Jewish nationality were detained and forced to work on repairing the bridge. Both during the roundup and while working on the bridge, the Jews were treated in a brutal manner. They were beaten and humiliated by the soldiers, and there were incidents of beards and whiskers being cut off. Witnesses testified that 2-3 elderly Jews were shot on the banks of the Orzyc River. Soldiers were also said to have thrown one or two Jews into a swamp and then knocked them down with logs of wood.

In the evening, the Germans herded all the workers into the local synagogue. After a while, however, the Germans separated the Poles from the Jews, after which they escorted the former to a building standing by the nearby market square (a few young Jews then managed to slip away with the Poles). The soldiers then began to abuse the Jews again. Accompanied by mocking shouts (Your God is very good! Pray to your God! May He save you!), the detainees were forced to say their prayers. In the end, most of the Jews were shot. The massacre was directed by an SS-Sturmmann from the artillery regiment of the Kempf Division (surnamed Ernst) and by a chevalier of the Secret Police. Other Wehrmacht soldiers and SS-Verfügungstruppe also participated. After the execution was completed, the bodies of the murdered were thrown into a ditch near the Jewish bathhouse, (Note: It was located a few dozen metres from the synagogue.) doused with flammable liquid and set on fire. This is also where they were later buried.

That evening, the Germans murdered about 50 Jews in Krasnosielc. Six or seven men managed to survive the massacre thanks to the intervention of an unspecified Wehrmacht unit. A paramedic accompanying this unit also treated the wounds of the surviving Jews. They were then taken to a military hospital in Olsztyn, where they were given expert medical attention and treated well. The entire group later managed to make their way to Polish lands occupied by the USSR.

== Trial of perpetrators ==
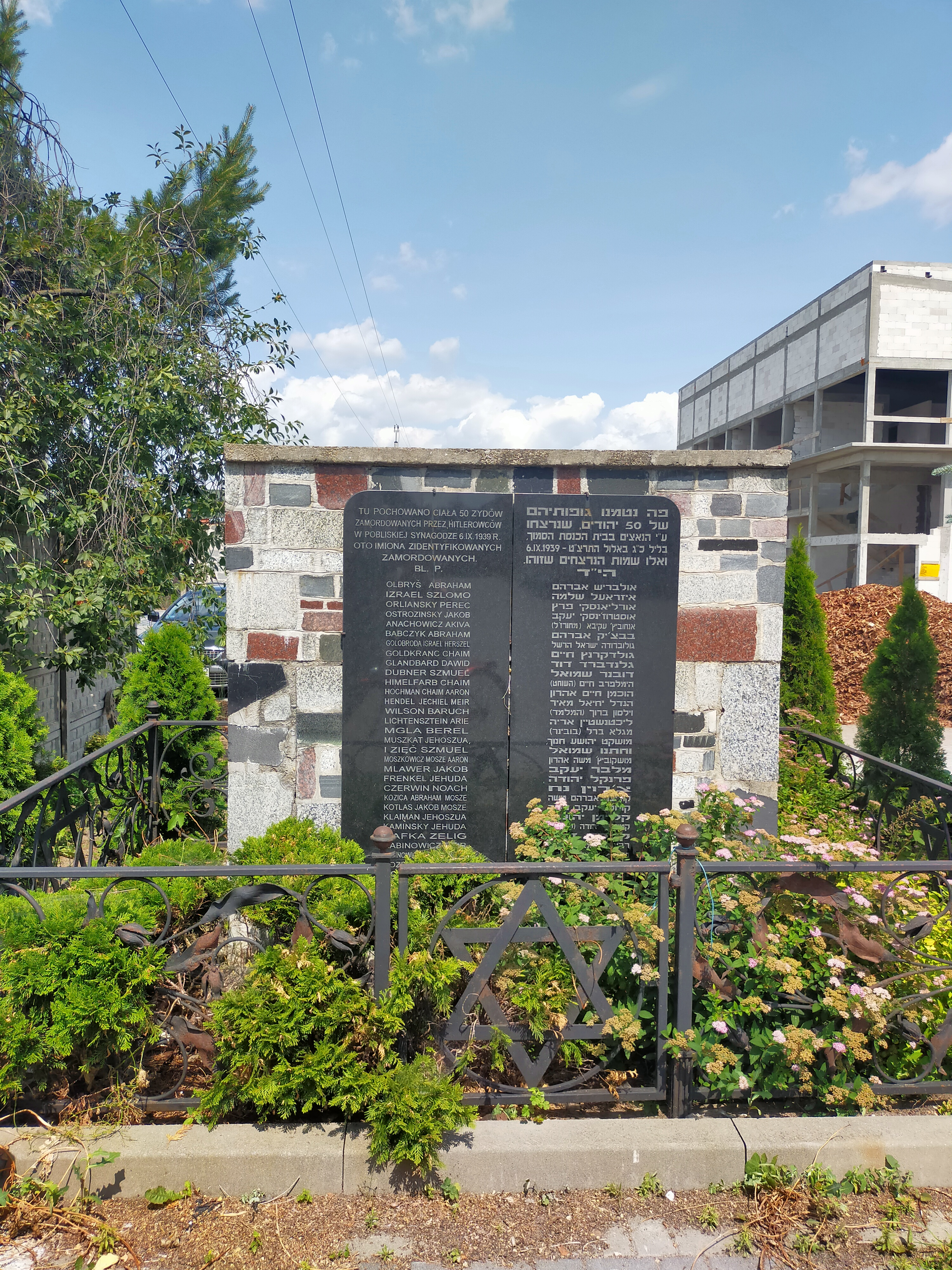
Monument erected in memory of the Jews murdered on 10 September 1939 in Krasnosielc

Already on 6 September 1939, the two soldiers in charge of the massacre faced a field court. SS-Sturmmann Ernst was sentenced to three years‘ imprisonment, while the Chief Officer received a sentence of nine years’ hard labour. The court justified the SS-Sturmmann's low sentence by stating that the convict was irritated because of the ‘many atrocities committed by the Poles against the Volksdeutsche, as well as because of the hostile attitude towards the Germans allegedly shown by the Jews. In addition, Ernst was considered to have "acted in youthful exuberance, completely without thinking", and was persuaded to commit the crime by ‘a certain non-commissioned officer’ who handed him a rifle. None of the other participants in the massacre were brought to justice. The trial of the perpetrators of the Krasnosielc massacre was one of the three cases in which the German military authorities decided to initiate criminal proceedings against soldiers responsible for crimes committed against Polish civilians during the September Campaign (the same was done only in the cases of the Błonie and Końskie massacres).

General Georg von Küchler commander of the German 3rd Army, which included the ‘Kempf’ Division considered the verdict "ridiculously lenient" and took steps to reopen the proceedings. However, his efforts were blocked by Reichsführer-SS Heinrich Himmler. Already on 4 October, the field court's verdict was, moreover, overturned under a general amnesty ordered by Hitler, covering soldiers convicted of crimes committed during the campaign in Poland.

American correspondent William L. Shirer claimed that the Krasnosielc massacre case "soon became widely known in Berlin". It was also noted in his War Diary by the Chief of Staff of the Supreme Land Forces Command (Oberkommando des Heeres), General Franz Halder. On the occasion of this affair, an exasperated Küchler is supposed to have declared that ‘Kempf's SS unit stains the honour of the army’, something Himmler could not forgive him for a long time. Some Polish sources state that Küchler's attitude was the reason why the 3rd Army became the only German army to participate in the invasion of Poland, whose staff was disbanded after the campaign. (Note: General Küchler's career, however, did not suffer much damage because of this. During the campaign in the West (1940) and the invasion of the USSR (1941), he commanded the German 18th Army. In January 1942, he took command of Army Group North leading the siege of Leningrad, and was promoted to Field Marshal in June of the same year. In the meantime, his relations with the SS had improved considerably. In the summer of 1940, Küchler even instructed officers and soldiers of the 18th Army to refrain from any criticism of SS and police units that were waging a national struggle in occupied Poland that required radical measures.)

== Memorial ==
A memorial tablet with the names of those murdered in the massacre was created in Israel and sent to Poland, where it was installed at the site of the massacre.
