= Krasnosielc =

- Village
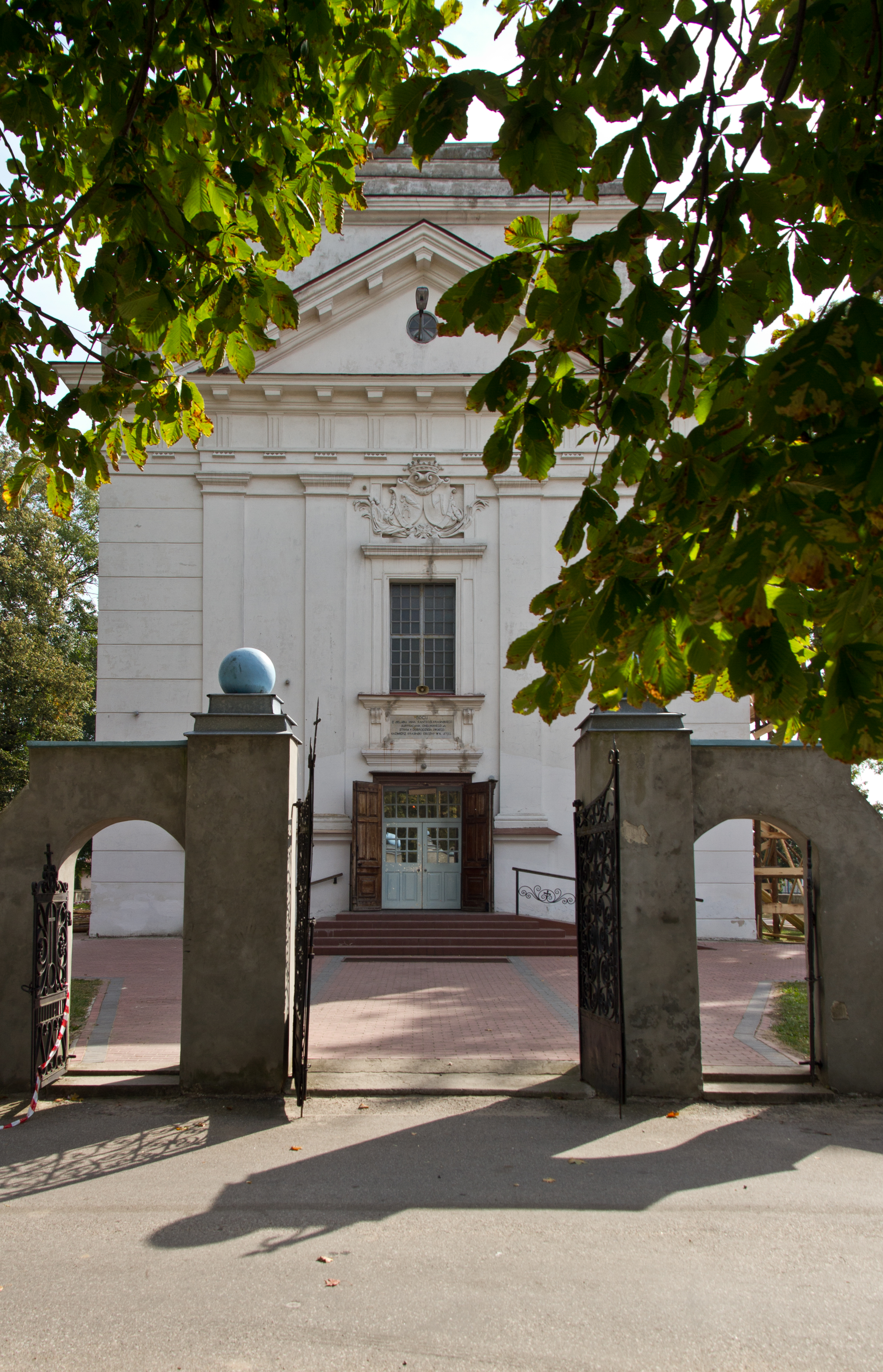
- Saint John Cantius Church

- Coat of arms

- Location within Poland
- Coordinates: 53°1′N 21°10′E
- Country: Poland
- Voivodeship: Masovian
- County: Maków
- Gmina: Krasnosielc

Population
  - Total: 1,300
- Time zone: UTC+1 (CET)
  - Summer (DST): UTC+2 (CEST)
- Vehicle registration: WMA
- Website: www.gminakrasnosielc.pl

Krasnosielc [krasˈnɔɕɛlt͡s] is a village in Maków County, in the Masovian Voivodeship, on the river Orzyc, in east-central Poland. It is the seat of the administrative district (gmina) called Gmina Krasnosielc.

== History ==
The village was first mentioned in documents in 1386, although there is evidence that the settlement is much older. It was previously known as Sielc and Siedlec (and in Yiddish: Silc). In 1386, the local Catholic parish was founded by bishop of Płock Ścibor z Radzymina and standard-bearer Paweł z Radzanowa of Prawdzic coat of arms. The village was located on a route which connected the cities of Ciechanów and Ostrołęka. It was a private village of Polish noble families, administratively located in the Przasnysz County in the Ciechanów Land in the Masovian Voivodeship in the Greater Poland Province of the Kingdom of Poland. In the 17th century, the village passed from the Ciemniewski family to the Krasiński family. Its name was then changed to Krasnosielc. Among the owners were Kazimierz Krasiński, notable late-18th-century Polish politician and participant of the Kościuszko Uprising of 1794, and his son Józef Wawrzyniec Krasiński, Polish senator, one of the richest Polish magnates of the first half of the 19th century. In 1781, Polish King Stanislaus II Augustus allowed four annual fairs to be held in Krasnosielc, and since 1786, eight annual fairs were held there. In 1824, the settlement obtained town rights.

Jews, who had begun to settle there in the mid-18th century, made up 60% of its population by 1841. The Jewish district was defined by a legal document according to which Jews were obliged to pay rent to count Józef Krasiński. A Jewish kahal was established in Krasnosielc in 1844 following an official complaint about improprieties of the kahal in Przasnysz. Krasnosielc lost its municipal status in 1869, soon after its last Polish owner Karol Krasiński died childless. In 1883 a synagogue was built. The town changed hands several times before Poland regained its independence in 1918.

The Jewish community of Krasnosielc ceased to exist in early September 1939. Following the German invasion of Poland, which started World War II, SS units of Panzer Division Kempf forced the Jews into the synagogue and massacred them there. A day later, the remainder (mostly men) were machine-gunned at the same location. The Krasnosielc massacre became widely publicized in Berlin as the first of its kind on Polish soil. In the beginning of the German occupation, the occupiers also carried out mass searches of homes of local policemen, postal workers and court employees. From 1939 to 1945, Krasnosielc was administered as part of Regierungsbezirk Zichenau, which was annexed to Nazi Germany as a part of the Province of East Prussia. In the following years, several Polish teachers from Krasnosielc were murdered in the Mauthausen concentration camp (see Nazi crimes against the Polish nation). In 1940, the Germans also carried out expulsions of Poles and operated a transit camp for Poles expelled from nearby villages. Expelled Poles were either enslaved as forced labour of new German colonists in the county or deported to more southern locations of occupied Poland, while their farms were afforested. Seven Poles from Krasnosielc were among the victims of a massacre committed by the SS in Żabikowo on January 22, 1945. German occupation ended in 1945, and the settlement was restored to Poland.

== Sports ==
The local football team is GUKS Krasnosielc. It competes in the lower leagues.

== Notable inhabitants ==
- Janusz Bojarski (born 1956), Polish general
- Harry Warner (1881–1958), co-founder of Warner Bros., born in Krasnosielc
- Sam Warner (1887–1927), co-founder of Warner Bros., born in Krasnosielc
