= Sam Warner =

American film studio executive (1887–1927)

- Born: Szmuel Wonsal; August 10, 1887; Krasnosielc, Congress Poland, Russian Empire
- Died: October 5, 1927 (aged 40); Los Angeles, California, U.S.
- Resting place: Home of Peace Cemetery
- Other names: S.L. Warner; Samuel L. Warner
- Occupations: Film executive Co-founder of Warner Bros.
- Years active: 1907–1927
- Spouse: Lina Basquette (m. 1925)
- Children: 1
- Relatives: brothers Harry, Albert, and Jack L. Warner

Samuel Louis Warner (born Szmuel Wonsal, August 10, 1887 – October 5, 1927) was an American film producer who was the co-founder and chief executive officer of Warner Bros. Pictures, Inc. He established the studio along with his brothers Harry, Albert, and Jack L. Warner. Sam Warner is credited with procuring the technology that enabled Warner Bros. to produce the film industry's first feature-length talking picture, The Jazz Singer. He died in 1927, on the day before the film's enormously successful premiere.

== Early years ==
Samuel "Wonsal" or "Wonskolaser", was born in the village of Krasnosielc, Poland (then part of Congress Poland within the Russian Empire). He was one of eleven children born to Benjamin, a shoe maker born in Krasnosielc, and Pearl Leah (née Eichelbaum), both Polish Jews. He had ten siblings. His sisters were Cecilia (1877–1881), Anna (1878–1958), Rose (1890–1955), Fannie (1891–1984) and Sadie (1895–1959). His brothers were Hirsz Mojżesz ((1881–1958), and later known as "Harry"), Abraham ((1884–1967), later known as "Albert" or "Abe"), Jacob ((1892–1978), later known as "Jack"), David (1893–1939) and Milton (1896–1915).

The family immigrated to Baltimore, Maryland in October 1889 on the steamship Hermann from Bremen, Germany. Their father had preceded them, immigrating to Baltimore in 1888, and following his trade in shoes and shoe repair. He changed the family name to Warner, which was used thereafter. As in many Jewish immigrant families, some of the children gradually acquired anglicized versions of their Yiddish-sounding names. Szmuel became Samuel, nicknamed Sam.

In Baltimore, Benjamin Warner struggled to make enough money to provide for his growing family. Following the advice of a friend, Benjamin relocated the family to Canada, where he attempted to make a living by bartering tin wares to trappers in exchange for furs. After two arduous years in Canada, Benjamin and his family returned to Baltimore. In 1896, the family relocated to Youngstown, Ohio, following the lead of Harry Warner, who established a shoe repair shop in the heart of the emerging industrial town. Benjamin worked with his son Harry in the shoe repair shop until he secured a loan to open a meat counter and grocery store in the city's downtown area. As a child, Warner found himself trying to find work through a range of various odd jobs.

== Career ==
=== Early business ventures ===
Samuel Warner was the first member of his family to move into the entertainment industry. In the early 1900s, he formed a business partnership with another Youngstown resident and "took over" the city's Old Grand Opera House, which he used as a venue for "cheap vaudeville and photoplays". The venture failed after one summer. Warner then secured a job as a projectionist at Idora Park, a local amusement park. He persuaded the family of the new medium's possibilities and negotiated the purchase of a Model B Kinetoscope from a projectionist who was "down on his luck". The purchase price was $1,000. Warner's interest in film came after seeing Thomas Edison's The Great Train Robbery while working as an employee at Cedar Point Pleasure Resort in Sandusky, Ohio. During this time, Albert agreed to join Samuel and together the two displayed showings of The Great Train Robbery at carnivals throughout the states of Ohio and Pennsylvania; Sam Warner would run the film projector and Albert would sell tickets.

In 1905, Harry Warner agreed to join his two brothers and sold his Youngstown bicycle shop. Through the money Harry made by selling the bicycle shop, the three brothers were now able to purchase a building in New Castle, Pennsylvania; The brothers named their new theater The Cascade Movie Palace. The Cascade Movie Palace was so successful that the brothers were able to purchase a second theater in New Castle. This makeshift theatre, called the Bijou, was furnished with chairs borrowed from a local undertaker. They maintained the theater until moving into film distribution in 1907. That year, the Warner brothers established the Pittsburgh-based Duquesne Amusement Company, and the three brothers rented an office in the Bakewell building in downtown Pittsburgh. Harry then sent Sam Warner to New York to purchase, and ship, films for their Pittsburgh exchange company, while he and Albert remained in Pittsburgh to run the business.

Their business, however, proved lucrative until the advent of Thomas Edison's Motion Picture Patents Company (also known as the Edison Trust), which charged distributors exorbitant fees. In 1909, the brothers sold the Cascade Theater for $40,000, and decided to open a second film exchange in Norfolk, Virginia; through this Norfolk company, younger brother Jacob (known as "Jack,") following Sam's advice, officially joined his three brothers' business and was sent to Norfolk by older brother Harry to serve as Warner's assistant. In 1910, the Warners would sell the family business, to the General Film Company, for "$10,000 in cash, $12,000 in preferred stock, and payments over a four-year period for a total of $52,000".

=== Formation of Warner Bros. ===
In 1910, the Warner brothers pooled their resources and moved into film production. After they sold their business, the brothers lent their support to filmmaker Carl Laemmle's Independent Moving Pictures Company, which challenged the monopolistic control of the Edison Trust; the brothers served as distributors for Laemmle's films in Pittsburgh. In 1912, Sam would help the brothers earn a $1,500 profit with his film Dante's Inferno. In the wake of this success, Harry Warner, seeing Edison's monopoly threat grow, decided to break with Laemmle and had the brothers start their own film production company, Warner Features. After this occurred, Harry Warner, who now had an office in New York with brother Albert, sent Sam and Jack to establish film exchanges in Los Angeles and San Francisco; Sam would run the company's Los Angeles division while Jack ran the company's San Francisco division. The brothers were soon poised to exploit the expanding California movie market. Their first opportunity to produce a major film came in 1918, when they purchased the film rights for My Four Years in Germany, a bestselling semi autobiographical account by Ambassador James W. Gerard that condemned German wartime atrocities. Profits from the success of My Four Years in Germany gave the four brothers the opportunity to establish a studio in the area near Hollywood. In the new Hollywood studio, Warner became co-head of production along with his younger brother, Jack. In this capacity, the two brothers secured new scripts and storylines, managed film production, and looked for ways to reduce production costs.

Between 1919 and 1920, the studio was not profitable. During this time, banker Motley H. Flint—who, unlike most bankers at the time, was not antisemitic— helped the Warners pay off their debts. The brothers then decided to relocate their production studio from Culver City to Sunset Boulevard. The studio would also rebound in 1921, after the success of the studio's film Why Girls Leave Home. With the film's success, director Harry Rapf was appointed the studio's new head producer. On April 4, 1923, following the studio's successful film Where the North Begins, Warner Bros. Pictures, Inc. was officially established.

One of the new company's first big stars would be the dog Rin Tin Tin. By directing Rin Tin Tin, newcomer director Daryl Zanuck's career would be greatly advanced. In addition to Rin Tin Tin, the studio was also able to gain more success with German film director Ernst Lubitsch, whose first film with the studio, The Marriage Circle, reached the New York Times Ten Best Films List of 1924. The film was also the studio's most financially successful film of the year and helped establish Lubitsch as the studio's top director. The Warners were also able to add another film to the New York Times Ten Best Films List with Beau Brummel. Despite the studio's success, the Warners were unable to compete with Paramount, Universal, and First National (The Big Three), and were soon threatened to be bought out by the end of 1924.

During this time, Harry Warner would provide more relief for the studio after he was able to purchase Brooklyn's Vitagraph Studios. In 1925, Sam Warner had also acquired a radio station, KFWB. After acquiring the radio station, Sam decided to make an attempt to use synchronized sound in future Warner Bros. Pictures. After a visit to Western Electric's Bell Laboratories headquarters, Sam Warner urged his brother, Harry, to sign an agreement with Western Electric to develop a series of "talking" shorts using the newly upgraded sound-on-film technology, a sound-on-disc system for motion pictures. Harry Warner, however, objected to using synchronized sound in the studio's films.

By February 1926, the studio had suffered a net loss of $333,413. Harry Warner ultimately agreed to use synchronized sound in Warner Bros. shorts if it was used only for background music. Harry Warner then made a visit to Western Electric's Bell Laboratories in New York and was impressed. One problem confronting the Warners though was that the high-ups at Western Electric were antisemitic. Sam Warner, however, was able to convince the high-ups to sign with the studio after his wife Lina, who was not Jewish, wore a gold cross at a dinner they attended with the Western Electric brass. Harry Warner then signed a partnership agreement with Western Electric to use Bell Laboratories to test the sound-on-film process. Warner and younger brother Jack then decided to take a big step forward and make Don Juan.

In May 1926, through the company's partnership with Western Electric, Sam formed a subsidiary known as Vitaphone. Through Vitaphone, the studio released a series of musical shorts and the feature-length Don Juan (which had a synchronized music track); upon establishing Vitaphone, Sam was also made Vice President of Warner Bros. Despite the money Don Juan was able to draw at the box office, it still could not match the expensive budget the brothers put into the film's production. These vehicles received further tepid responses, and Harry grew increasingly opposed to the venture.

Around this time, Paramount head Adolph Zukor offered Sam a deal as an executive producer for his studio if he brought Vitaphone with him; during the year, Harry had also become the company president. Sam Warner, not wanting to take any more of brother Harry's refusal to move forward with using sound in future Warner films, agreed to accept Zukor's offer, but the deal between them died after Paramount lost money in the wake of Rudolph Valentino's death. By April 1927, First National, Paramount, MGM, Universal, and Cecil B. De Mille's Producers Distributing (the Big Five studios) had put the Warners in financial ruin. Western Electric renewed the Warner-Vitaphone contract on the term that Western Electric was no longer exclusive, allowing other film companies to test sound. Harry Warner eventually agreed to accept Sam's demands. The Warner brothers pushed ahead with The Jazz Singer, a new Vitaphone feature based on a Broadway play and starring Al Jolson. The Jazz Singer broke box-office records, establishing Warner Bros. as a major player in Hollywood and single-handedly launching the talkie revolution.

== Personal life ==
In 1925, after years of bachelorhood, Warner met eighteen-year-old Ziegfeld Follies performer and actress Lina Basquette while spending time in New York visiting the Bell Laboratories. The two began an intense love affair. On July 4, 1925, the two were married. While Warner's younger brother Jack did not object to Basquette's Catholicism, the rest of the Warner family did. They refused to accept Basquette and did not acknowledge her as a member of the Warner clan. On October 6, 1926, the couple's only child, daughter Lita, was born.

After Sam Warner's death in 1927, brother Harry asked Lina Basquette to give up custody of the couple's daughter Lita. Harry Warner claimed he was concerned that little Lita would be raised as Catholic instead of Jewish (according to Basquette, she and Sam Warner agreed to raise any female children they had as Catholic and any male children as Jewish). Harry Warner and his wife offered Lina Basquette large amounts of money to relinquish custody of her daughter but she refused. She finally relented after Harry Warner promised her that Lita would receive a $300,000 trust fund ($5.8 million today), with Harry Warner and his wife awarded legal custody of Lita on March 30, 1930. Basquette quickly regretted her decision and attempted to regain custody of her daughter. Basquette, however, was never financially stable enough to do so as the Warner family launched several legal suits against her to win back Sam Warner's share of Warner Bros. studio. She would only see Lita on two occasions over the next twenty years: in 1935, when Harry Warner and his family moved to Los Angeles, and when Lita married Dr. Nathan Hiatt in 1947. Basquette and her daughter reconnected in 1977 when Basquette backed a lawsuit that Lita brought against her uncle Jack Warner's estate.

== Death ==
In September 1927, Jack—who was working nonstop with Sam on production of The Jazz Singer—noticed that his brother started having severe headaches and nosebleeds. By the end of the month, Sam was unable to walk straight. He was hospitalized and was diagnosed with a sinus infection that was aggravated by several abscessed teeth. Doctors also discovered that Warner had developed a mastoid infection of the brain. After four surgeries to remove the infection, Warner slipped into a coma. On October 5, 1927, the day before the premiere of The Jazz Singer, Sam Warner died from a combination of several conditions: pneumonia caused by sinusitis, osteomyelitis, and epidural and subdural abscesses.

According to Hollywood Be Thy Name, the 1993 memoir of Jack Warner Jr., and Cass Warner Sperling, character actor William Demarest claimed that Sam Warner was murdered by his own brothers. This allegation, leveled in 1977, was never corroborated, and Demarest's reliability was questioned because of his long dependence on alcohol; the last time that Sam would meet with his entire family was at his parents' wedding anniversary in 1926.

Crowds of movie stars gathered at the Bresse Brothers funeral parlor to attend Warner's funeral. A private memorial service was then held in the Warner Bros. studio on October 9, 1927. He is interred in the Warner family mausoleum at Home of Peace Cemetery in East Los Angeles, California.

As the family grieved over Warner's sudden death, the success of The Jazz Singer helped establish Warner Bros. as a major studio. While Warner Bros. invested only $500,000 in the film, the studio reaped $3 million in profits. Hollywood's five major studios, which controlled most of the nation's movie theaters, initially attempted to block the growth of "talking pictures". In the face of such organized opposition, Warner Bros. produced twelve "talkies" in 1928 alone. The following year, the newly formed Academy of Motion Pictures Arts and Sciences recognized Warner Bros. for "revolutionizing the industry with sound".

== Legacy ==
For his contribution to the motion picture industry, Sam Warner has a star on the Hollywood Walk of Fame at 6201 Hollywood Boulevard.

A gymnasium was donated by the Warner Brothers family to the Hebrew Orphan Asylum (HOA) of the City of New York on September 30, 1928, in memory of Sam L. Warner and Milton Warner. The HOA was located between 136th to 138th street, fronting Amsterdam Ave, in Hamilton Heights. The HOA was in operation on that site from 1884 to 1941. The buildings were then leased from the City - to the City College of New York (CCNY), in collaboration with the War Department, as a dormitory for returning veterans. The former Main Building was named "Army Hall" and the former Reception House was named "Finley Hall," Warner Gym kept its name. In 1952, the Board of Education built P.S. 192 as a connection to Warner Gym. CCNY traded the HOA property for a public park known as Jasper Oval (on Convent Ave), moving out in 1955. The HOA buildings, with the exception of Warner Gym, were demolished in 1956 to make way for the Jacob H. Schiff Park. Warner Gym can still be seen on 138th Street, close to Hamilton Place. An entrance vestibule just inside the side gate has a memorial stone from the Warner Family.
