= Come Across =

1929 film

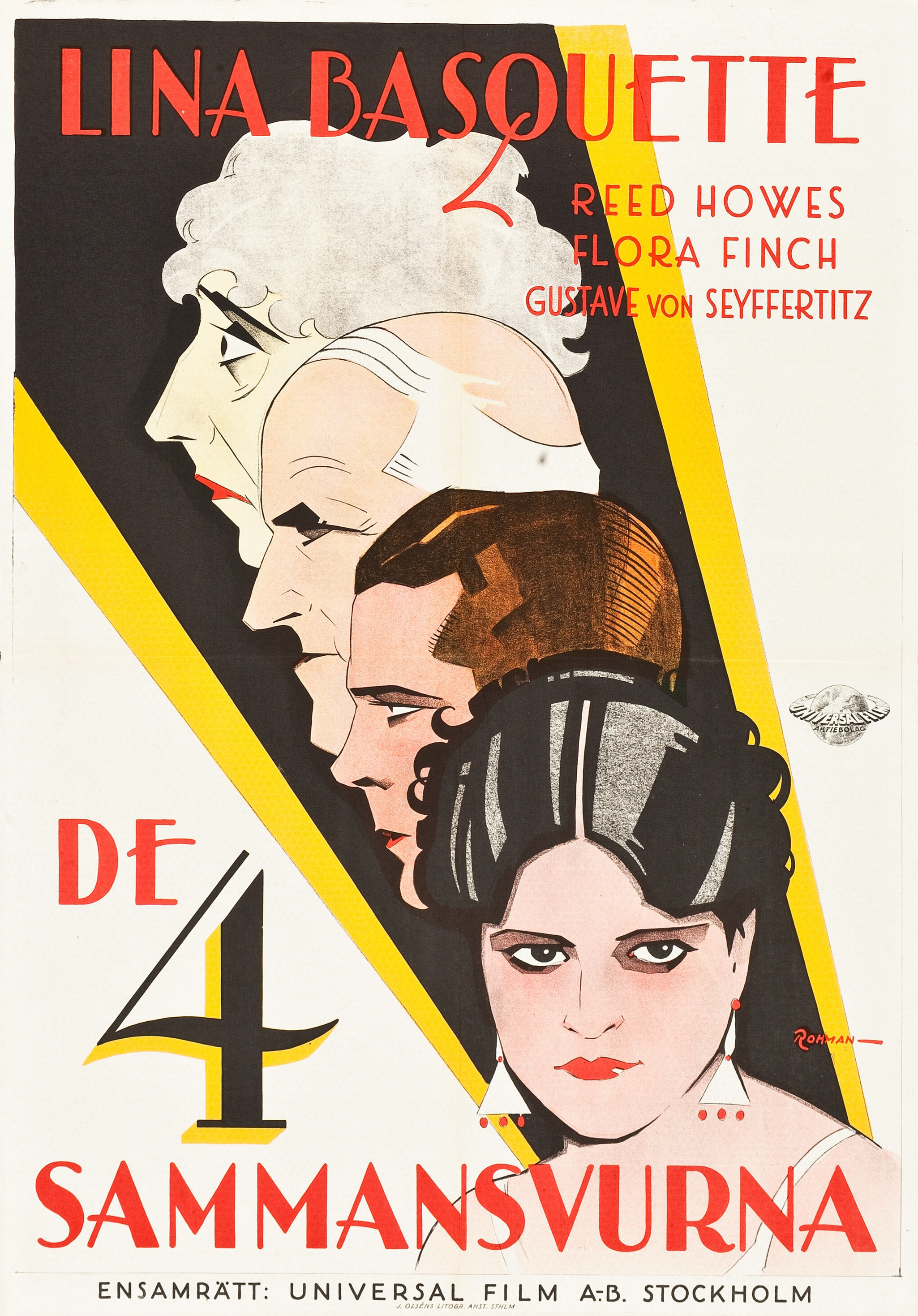
- Swedish theatrical release poster
- Directed by: Ray Taylor
- Screenplay by: Peter Milne; Jack Rollens; Monte Carter; Ford Beebe
- Based on: The Stolen Lady by William Dudley Pelley
- Starring: Lina Basquette; Reed Howes; Flora Finch; Crauford Kent; Gustav von Seyffertitz; Clarissa Selwynne
- Cinematography: Frank Redman
- Edited by: Thomas Malloy
- Production company: Universal Pictures
- Distributed by: Universal Pictures
- Release date: June 30, 1929
- Running time: 60 minutes (6 reels)
- Country: United States
- Languages: Sound (Part-Talkie); English Intertitles

Come Across is a 1929 American sound part-talkie crime drama film, directed by Ray Taylor and written by Peter Milne, Jack Rollens, Monte Carter and Ford Beebe. The film stars Lina Basquette, Reed Howes, Flora Finch, Crauford Kent, Gustav von Seyffertitz and Clarissa Selwynne. The film was released on June 30, 1929, by Universal Pictures. In addition to sequences with audible dialogue or talking sequences, the film features a synchronized musical score and sound effects along with English intertitles. The soundtrack was recorded using the Western Electric sound-on-film system. The film was distributed by Universal Pictures. The film is based on a short story by William Dudley Pelley which is entitled “The Stolen Lady.”

== Plot ==
Bored with her privileged life, socialite Mary Houston seeks thrills in the seedy world of the Sphinx Night Club. On a whim, she becomes a captivating cabaret dancer, unwittingly drawing the eye of the club's shady owner, Pop Hanson, and his charming accomplice, Harry. Pop concocts a daring scheme to swindle a Montana millionaire, enlisting Harry to pose as the man's long-lost brother. She joins his elaborate ruse, posing as his wife and using her aunt's mansion as their base. Torn between her attraction to Harry and her growing unease with the con, Mary hatches a counter-plan. Instead of risking Harry's reputation, she asks her old friend George, secretly harboring a jealous flame for Mary, to play the millionaire. Their scheme unravels in a dramatic twist fueled by George's consuming envy. He exposes the plot to the authorities, leading to chaos and arrests. In the fallout, the truth dawns - Harry is not a conman, but a playwright seeking inspiration for his next masterpiece.

== Cast ==
- Lina Basquette - Mary Houston
- Reed Howes - Harry Fraser
- Flora Finch - Cassie
- Crauford Kent - George Harcourt
- Gustav von Seyffertitz - Pop Hanson
- Clarissa Selwynne - Harriet Houston

== See also ==
- List of early sound feature films (1926–1929)
