= Harry Warner =

American studio executive (1881–1958)

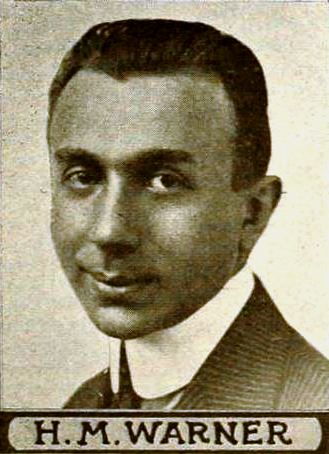
- Warner c. 1919
- Born: Hirsz Mojżesz Wonsal; December 12, 1881; Krasnosielc, Łomża Governorate, Congress Poland, Russian Empire
- Died: July 25, 1958 (aged 76); Los Angeles, California, U.S.
- Resting place: Home of Peace Cemetery, East Los Angeles
- Occupations: Film executive Co-founder of Warner Bros.
- Years active: 1903–1956
- Spouse: Rea Levinson
- Children: 3 including Sam's adopted daughter
- Relatives: brothers Albert, Sam, and Jack L. Warner

Harry Morris Warner (born Hirsz Mojżesz Wonsal; December 12, 1881 – July 25, 1958) was an American studio executive, one of the founders of Warner Bros. Pictures, Inc., and a major contributor to the development of the film industry. Along with his three younger brothers (Albert, Sam and Jack), Warner played a crucial role in the film business and establishing Warner Bros., serving as the company president until 1956.

== Early life ==
Warner was born Hirsz Mojżesz "Wonsal" or "Wonskolaser" to a family of Ashkenazi Jews from the village of Krasnosielc, Poland (then part of Congress Poland in the Russian Empire). He was the son of Benjamin Wonsal, a shoemaker born in Krasnosielc, and Pearl Leah Eichelbaum. His given name was Mojżesz (Moses), however, he was called Hirsz (Anglicized to Hirsch) in the United States. In October 1889, he came to Baltimore, Maryland with his mother and siblings on the steamship Hermann from Bremen, Germany. Their father had preceded them, immigrating to Baltimore in 1888 to pursue his trade in shoes and shoe repair. At that time that he changed the family name to Warner which was used thereafter. As in many Jewish immigrant families, some of the children gradually acquired anglicized versions of their Yiddish-sounding names. Hirsz became Harry, and his middle name Morris was likely a version of Mojżesz.

In Baltimore, the money Benjamin Warner earned in the shoe repair business was not enough to provide for his growing household. He and Pearl had another daughter, Fannie, not long after they arrived. Benjamin moved the family to Canada, inspired by a friend's advice that he could make an excellent living bartering tin wares with trappers in exchange for furs. Sons Jacob and David Warner were born in London, Ontario. After two arduous years living in Canada, the Warners returned to Baltimore. Two more children, Sadie and Milton, were added to the household there. In 1896, the family moved to Youngstown, Ohio, following the lead of Harry, who had established a shoe repair shop in the heart of the emerging industrial town. Benjamin worked with Harry in the shoe repair shop until he secured a loan to open a meat counter and grocery store in the city's downtown area.

In 1899, Harry opened a bicycle shop in Youngstown, Ohio with his brother, Abraham. Eventually, Harry and Abe also opened a bowling alley together. The bowling alley failed and closed shortly after it opened. Harry eventually accepted an offer to become a salesman for a local meat franchise, and sold meat in Ohio and Pennsylvania. However, by his nineteenth birthday, Harry was reduced to living in his parents' crowded household.

== Business career in films ==
In 1903, Harry's brothers, Abe and Sam, began to exhibit The Great Train Robbery at carnivals across Ohio and Pennsylvania. In 1905, Harry sold his bicycle shop and joined his brothers in their fledgling film business. With the money Harry made from selling the bicycle shop, the three brothers were able to purchase a building in New Castle, Pennsylvania. They used the building to establish their first theater, the Cascade. The Cascade was so successful that the brothers were able to purchase a second theater in New Castle. The makeshift theatre, called the Bijou, was furnished with chairs borrowed from a local undertaker.

In 1907, the Warners expanded the business further and purchased fifteen theaters in Pennsylvania. Harry, Sam, and Albert formed a new film exchange company, The Duquesne Amusement Supply Company, and rented an office in the Bakewell building in downtown Pittsburgh. Harry sent Sam to New York to purchase, and ship, films for their Pittsburgh exchange company, while he and Albert remained in Pittsburgh to run the business. In 1909, the brothers sold the Cascade Theater and established a second film exchange company in Norfolk, Virginia. Harry agreed to let younger brother Jack be a part of the company, sending him to Norfolk to serve as Sam's assistant. A serious problem threatened the Warners' film company with the advent of Thomas Edison's Motion Picture Patents Company (also known as the Edison Trust), which charged distributors exorbitant fees. In 1910, the Warners sold the family business to the General Film Company for "$10,000 in cash, $12,000 in preferred stock, and payments over a four-year period for a total of $52,000".

After they sold their business, Harry and his three brothers joined forces with independent filmmaker Carl Laemmle's Independent Motion Picture Company, and began distributing films from his Pittsburgh film exchange division. In 1912, the brothers earned a $1,500 profit with the film Dante's Inferno. In the wake of their success, Harry and the brothers broke with Laemmle and established their own film production company. They named their new company Warner Features. Once Warner Features was established, Harry acquired an office in New York with his brother Albert, sending Sam and Jack to run the new corporation's film exchange divisions in San Francisco and Los Angeles. In 1917, Harry won more capital for the studio when he was able to negotiate a deal with Ambassador James W. Gerard to make Gerard's book My Four Years In Germany into a film.

In 1918, after the success of My Four Years in Germany, the brothers were able to establish a studio near Hollywood, California. In the new Hollywood studio, Sam became co-head of production along with his younger brother, Jack. They were convinced that they would have to make movies themselves if they were to ever generate a profit. Between the years 1919 and 1920, the studio did not turn a profit. During that time, banker Motley Flint, who was unlike most bankers at the time, not anti-semitic, helped the brothers pay off their debts. The four brothers then decided to move their studio from Culver City, California, to the Sunset Boulevard section of Hollywood.

Warner decided to focus on making only dramas for the studio during that time. The studio rebounded in 1921 with the success of the studio's film Why Girls Leave Home; The film's director, Harry Rapf, became the studio's new head producer. On April 4, 1923, following the success of the studio's film The Gold Diggers, Warner Bros. Pictures, Inc. was officially established, with help from a loan given to Harry by Montly Flint. Harry became company president, with Albert as treasurer and Jack and Sam as co-heads of production. Harry and his family moved to Hollywood.

Harry hired Margaret J. Winkler as a secretary from 1917 to 1921. Impressed by her competence and knowledge in film distribution, he recommended Winkler to leave Warner Bros. and form Winkler Pictures, after refusing to distribute Pat Sullivan's Felix the Cat series on her recommendation. Harry personally recommended Winkler's services to a young Walt Disney, whose filmmaking endeavors under Winkler jumpstarted his career and the golden age of American animation in general.

=== Warner Bros. Pictures, Inc. ===
The studio discovered a trained German Shepherd named Rin Tin Tin in 1923. The canine made his starring debut in Where the North Begins, a film about an abandoned pup who is raised by wolves and befriends a fur trapper. According to a biographer, Jack Warner's initial doubts about the project were quelled when he met Rin Tin Tin, "who seemed to display more intelligence than some of the Warner comics." The trained dog proved to be the studio's most important commercial asset until the introduction of sound. Prolific screenwriter Darryl F. Zanuck produced several scripts for Rin Tin Tin vehicles and, during one year, wrote more than half of the studio's features. Between 1928 and 1933, Zanuck was the studio's executive producer, a position whose responsibilities included the day-to-day production of films; while Warner's younger brother Jack and Zanuck were able to develop a close friendship, Warner never really accepted Zanuck as a friend.

After establishing Warner Bros., the studio had unfortunately overdrawn $1 million (the amount which Warner had borrowed from Flint) and Warner decided to pay off the debt by expanding the studio's operations further. In the process, Warner acquired forty theaters in Pennsylvania. In 1924, Warner Bros. produced two more successful films, The Marriage Circle and Beau Brummell. In 1924, after Rapf left the studio to accept an offer at MGM, Ernst Lubitsch, the successful director of The Marriage Circle, was also given the title of head producer; Lubitsch added additional success to the studio's profits. The film Beau Brummel also made John Barrymore a top star at the studio as well. Although the studio now had success, the brothers were still unable to compete with The Big Three (Paramount, Universal, and First National).

In 1925, Harry and a large group of independent film-makers assembled in Milwaukee, Wisconsin to challenge the monopoly the Big Three had over the film industry. Harry and the other independent film-makers at the Milwaukee convention agreed to spend $500,000 in newspaper advertisements; this action would help benefit Warner Bros. profits. With help from a loan supplied by Goldman, Sachs head banker Waddill Catchings, Warner would find a way to successfully respond to the growing concern the Big Three Studios further induced to Warner Bros., and expanded the company's operations further by purchasing the Brooklyn theater company Vitagraph. Because of that, Warner Pictures now owned theaters in the New York area. Around the time, Warner purchased a home in the Los Angeles neighborhood of Hancock Park, where he stayed until 1929.

In the later part of 1925, Harry's younger brother Sam had also acquired a radio station, KFWB. After acquiring his radio station, Sam decided to make an attempt to use synchronized sound in future Warner Bros. Pictures. Harry had initial reservations about the idea; when Sam first made this suggestion, Harry wanted to focus on background music before delving into people talking on screen. Harry responded, "We could ultimately develop sound to the point where people ask for talking pictures" The company also began acquiring theaters. Eventually, Warner Bros. came to own and operate some 250 theaters. By February 1926, however, the brothers' radio business had failed, and the studio was facing a net loss of $333,413.00.

After a long period of refusing to accept the usage of sound in the company's films, Warner agreed to use synchronized sound in Warner Bros. shorts, as long as it was only used for background music, Harry then made a visit to Western Electric's Bell Laboratories in New York, (which younger brother Sam had visited earlier) and was impressed. One problem that occurred for the Warners, though, was the fact that the high-ups at Western Electric were perceived as anti-Semitic. Sam, though, was able to convince the high-ups to sign with the studio after his wife Lina wore a gold cross at a dinner he attended with Western Electric brass. After that, Harry signed a partnership agreement with Western Electric to use Bell Laboratories to test the sound-on-film process.

=== Godfather of Talkies ===
The success of Warner Bros.' early talkie films (The Jazz Singer, The Lights of New York, The Singing Fool and The Terror) catapulted the studio into the ranks of the major studios. Flush with cash, the Warners abandoned their old location in the Poverty Row section of Hollywood and acquired a big studio in Burbank, California. As a result of this success, Warner was able to acquire the Stanley Company of America (founded by Jules E. Mastbaum), which controlled most of the first-run theaters on the East Coast. The purchase gave them a share in rival First National Pictures, of which Stanley owned one-third. After the transaction Warner was soon able to acquire William Fox's one third remaining share in First National and now was officially the majority stockholder of the company. After the success of the studio's 1929 First National film Noah's Ark, Harry Warner agreed to make Michael Curtiz a major director at the Burbank studio as well.

After purchasing a string of music publishers, Warner diversified the company by establishing a music subsidiary-Warner Bros. Music- and buying out additional radio companies, acquiring foreign sound patents, and adding a lithograph company as well; he even was able to produce a Broadway musical Fifty Million Frenchmen. By the time the 1st Academy Awards took place, Warner was recognized as the second most powerful figure in the movie industry, just behind MGM head Nicholas Schenck. In the wake of the success of Gold Diggers of Broadway, journalists had dubbed Warner "the godfather of the talking screen." The studio's net profit was now over $14,000,000.00. During that time, Warner soon also grew tired of the Hollywood atmosphere and acquired a twenty-two acre ranch in Mount Vernon, New York. Once Warner returned to New York, he and Albert were able to work together once again.

=== The Great Depression ===
After Albert's advice, Jack and Harry Warner acquired the rights to three Paramount stars (William Powell, Kay Francis, and Ruth Chatterton) for salaries doubled from their previous ones. The move proved to be a success, and stockholders maintained confidence in the Warners. The first year of the Great Depression, 1930, did not badly damage the studio and Warner was even able to acquire more theaters for the studio in Atlantic City, New Jersey. During that time, Warner was engaged in a lawsuit with a Boston stockholder who accused him of trying use money from the studio's profitable businesses to try to purchase his vast 300 shares of stock and create a monopoly. The company however suffered a minor financial blow during the year after Motley Flint, the longtime banker for the studio, and by now also a close friend of the Warners, was murdered by an angry investor.

In the latter part of 1929, much to Harry's dismay, younger brother Jack hired sixty-one-year-old actor George Arliss to star in the studio's film Disraeli. To Warner's surprise, the film Disraeli was a success at the box office, Arliss won the Academy Award for Best Actor, and Warner was convinced to make him a top star for the studio as well. During the Depression era, the studio also produced a series of gangster films; Warner Bros. soon became known as "gangster studio." The studio's first gangster film Little Caesar was a great success at the box office. After Little Caesar, the studio agreed to cast Edward Robinson in a wave of gangster pictures. The studio's second gangster film, The Public Enemy, also arguably made James Cagney the studio's new top star, and the Warners were now further convinced to make more gangster films as well. Another gangster film the studio released during the Depression era was the critically acclaimed I Am a Fugitive from a Chain Gang. The film made Paul Muni a top studio star, and also got audiences in the United States to question the country’s legal system.

However, they would begin to feel the effects of the Depression in 1931. As ticket prices became unaffordable, the studio would lose money. By the end of 1931, the studio suffered a net loss of reportedly $8,000,000.00, During that time, Warner rented the Teddington Studios in southwest London. Hoping to fight off the financial problems the Depression gave the studio, Warner Bros was now focused on making films for the London market and Irving Asher was appointed as the Teddington Studio's head producer. Unfortunately, the Teddington studio could not bring in additional profit for the Warners, and the Burbank studio lost $14,000,000 in 1932 as well. In 1934, Warner officially bought out the struggling Teddington Studio.

However, relief would come for the studio after Franklin Roosevelt became US president in 1933 and the New Deal revived the US Economy. Moviegoers returned and during the year the studio was able to make a very profitable picture, 42nd Street, revived the studio's musical films business. However, in 1933, a blow happened as the studio's longtime head producer Darryl F. Zanuck quit over disagreements with Harry Warner, which included Warner being strongly against allowing Zanuck’s film Baby Face to step outside the Hays Code boundaries; and refusing to restore Zanuck’s salary, which had been reduced as a result of the financial woes the studio temporarily faced from President Roosevelt's bank holiday - let alone raise it in the wake of the New Deal's economic rebound. After Zanuck's resignation, studio director Hal B. Wallis became the studio's executive producer, and Harry who along with his brother Jack, was a notable "penny-pincher" finally agreed to bring salaries back up to industry expectations again.

In 1933, the studio was able to bring newspaper tycoon William Randolph Hearst's Cosmopolitan films into the Warner Bros. fold. Hearst had previously been signed with MGM, but he ended his ties with the company after a dispute with the company's head producer Irving Thalberg over the treatment of Marion Davies; Davies was a longtime mistress of Hearst, and was now struggling to draw box office success. Through the studio's partnership with Hearst, Harry's younger brother Jack was able to sign Davies to a studio contract as well. However, Hearst's company and Davies' films could not increase the studio's net profits.

In 1934, the studio had a net loss of over $2,500,000; $500,000 of the loss was the result of physical damage to the Warner Bros. Burbank studio which occurred after a massive fire broke out in the studio around the end of 1934 destroying twenty years' worth of early Warner Bros. films. The next year, Hearst's film adaption of William Shakespeare's A Midsummer Night's Dream failed at the box office and the studio's net loss increased. During that time, Warner was indicted, along with six other Hollywood studio figures who owned movie theaters, of conspiracy to violate the Sherman Antitrust Act through an attempt to gain a monopoly over theaters in the St. Louis area. In 1935, Warner, along with executives at RKO and Paramount, were put on trial for this charge. After a mistrial, Warner sold the company's movie theaters, at least for a short time, and the case was never reopened. One problem that remained for Warner, however, was that the studio's projectionist labor union had fallen under Mafia control.

In 1935, the studio's revived musicals also had a major blow after director Busby Berkeley was arrested after killing three people while driving drunk one night. During the studio's union crisis, Warner received a threatening phone call from a union member saying that he would seize Warner's daughter Betty and adopted daughter Lita within forty-eight hours. Warner then agreed to accept the union's demands, and the kidnapping threat ended. However, in 1935 Harry got some relief as the studio rebounded with a year-end net profit of $674,158.00. Around that time, a depressed Warner—seeing that the newly recovered business no longer needed loans to pay off debts—decided to go to California and acquired 3,000 acres (12 km^{2}) of ranch land just northwest of Hollywood in Calabasas, California. He later moved to a 1,100-acre ranch in the San Fernando Valley.

During 1936, the studio's film The Story of Louis Pasteur was a success at the box office. In addition to the film's box office success, Paul Muni won the Oscar for Best Actor in March 1937 for his performance as the title role. The studio's film The Life of Emile Zola (1937), also starring Muni, gave the studio its first Oscar for Best Picture.

== World War II ==
Warner occupied a central place in the Hollywood-Washington wartime propaganda effort during the Second World War, and by the end of 1942, served as a frequent, anti-Axis spokesman for the movie industry. Despite his conservative viewpoint and longtime affiliation with the Republican Party, Warner was also a close friend of President Franklin D. Roosevelt and supported him during the early 1930s. During Roosevelt's fight for the Democratic nomination in early 1932, the Warners made an effort to make his name known throughout the state of California. After Roosevelt was nominated, the three brothers asked their friends to contribute to his campaign. Jack Warner even staged a "Motion Picture and Electrical Parade Sports Pageant" at L.A. Stadium in Roosevelt's honor in 1932. During Roosevelt's 1932 campaign, Warner and the studio also contributed $10,000.00 to the Democratic National Committee. In the wake of Nazi Germany's rise to power, Warner became a key proponent of US intervention in Europe.

Prior to the beginning of the war in Europe, Warner had produced a series of film shorts which glorified America's fight against Germany during World War I; Warner later received an honorary award for producing the shorts. By the fall of 1938, Warner had gradually helped block the distribution of Warner Bros. films in Nazi Germany and its ally Italy. Prior to the war's beginning in Europe, Warner supervised the production of two anti-German feature films, The Life of Emile Zola (1937) and Confessions of a Nazi Spy (1939). He spent large sums of money to get many of his relatives and employees out of Germany when the war officially began in the latter part of 1939. Before the U.S. officially entered World War II, Warner supervised the production of three more anti-German films: The Sea Hawk (1940), which portrayed Spain's King Phillip II as an equivalent to Adolf Hitler; Sergeant York (1941), and You're in the Army Now (1941).

After America's entry into the war, Warner decided to focus on making just war films. During the duration of the war these included Casablanca, Yankee Doodle Dandy, This Is the Army, and the controversial film Mission to Moscow. At the premieres of Yankee Doodle Dandy (in Los Angeles, New York, and London), audiences for the film purchased a total of $15,600,000.00 in war bonds for the governments of England and the United States. By the middle of 1943, however, it became clear that audiences were tired of war films. Despite the growing pressure to abandon the topic, Warner continued to produce them, losing money in the process. Eventually, in honor of studio contributions to the war cause, the United States Government would name a Liberty Ship after the brothers' father, Benjamin Warner, and Warner would be given the honor of christening the ship. By the time the war ended, $20,000,000.00 worth of war bonds would be purchased through the studio, the Red Cross collected 5,200 pints of plasma from studio employees, and 763 studio employees, including Warner's son-in-law Milton Sperling and nephew Jack Warner Jr., served in the U.S. armed forces.

After a dispute over ownership of Casablanca's Oscar for Best Picture, head producer Hal B. Wallis broke with Warner and resigned from the studio. After Casablanca, Humphrey Bogart became arguably the studio's top star. In 1943, Olivia de Havilland (whom Warner was now loaning to different companies) sued Jack Warner for breach of contract. De Havilland cited that the government laws only required employee contracts to reach a maximum of seven years; When de Havilland won her case many of the studio's longtime actors were freed of their contracts. To help retain them, Harry decided to eliminate the studio's suspension policy.

== Postwar era ==
In 1947, Warner, who was by now exhausted from all his years of arguing with his brother Jack, decided to spend more time at his San Fernando Valley ranch and to expand his interest in horse racing. Along with brother Jack, in 1938, Harry Warner became one of the founders of Hollywood Park Racetrack. In partnership with Mervyn Le Roy, he created the W-L Ranch Co. Thoroughbred racing stable. In 1947, the Warner-LeRoy stable was able to acquire a valuable racehorse named "Stepfather." Warner had a bitter rivalry with his brother Jack over the years, particularly due to Jack's longtime infidelities (as Jack had been engaged in affairs with a wide range of various women since Warner Bros. Inc. was established in 1923) and waste of the Burbank studio's money. In the 1930s Harry, like most of his relatives, also refused to accept Jack's second wife, actress Ann Paige - with whom Jack had an affair while still married to his first wife Irma Solomon - as a member of the Warner clan. When Jack and Ann officially got married in January 1936, Harry and the rest of the Warner family refused to attend the ceremony. In a letter Harry sent to Jack on his wedding day to Ann, Harry said "the only thing that could come from this day was that our parents didn't live to see this."

Throughout the early years of the studio's existence, various people, including Warner's younger brother Sam, were buffers between Harry and Jack. The last person to serve as a buffer between the two, father Benjamin Warner, died on November 5, 1935. After Benjamin's death, Jack and Harry were now barely on speaking terms, and were merely just business partners to one another. Jack's marriage to Ann was also arguably a huge turning point in the two brothers' fragile relationship as well; Harry's arguments with Jack were now practically on a daily basis.

By the early 1950s, the brothers' long-simmering feud had risen to new heights, as Jack began spending a lot of his time in France, occasionally ignored managing the studio in favor of vacationing, gambling, and socializing with royalty, and spent studio money lavishly on 3-D films. On one occasion during that time, studio employees claimed they saw Harry Warner who was very furious at his brother Jack chase him through the studio with a lead pipe, shouting "I'll get you for this, you son of a b_".

The studio prospered post-war time, and by 1946, company payroll had reached $600,000 a week for studio employees, and the studio's net profit would reach $19,424,650.00 by the end of the year as well. During that time, Warner hired his son-in-law, Milton Sperling, to head an independent film production company for the studio. In 1947, Harry also tried to move Warner Bros. headquarters from the longtime New York building to the Burbank area, but was unsuccessful. By the end of 1947, the studio had a record net profit of $22,000,000.00, although the following year, the studio profits would decrease by 50%.

During that time, the studio was a party to the United States v. Paramount Pictures, Inc. antitrust case. The suit, brought by the Justice Department and the Federal Trade Commission, claimed that the five integrated studio-theater chain combinations restrained competition. The Supreme Court heard the case in 1948, and ruled for the government. As a result, Warner and four other major studios were forced to separate production from exhibition. In early 1953, the brothers finally fulfilled their end of the bargain and sold their theater chain to Fabian Enterprises. In 1948, Bette Davis, now fed up with Jack Warner, was a big problem for Harry after she and a number of her colleagues, departed from the studio after finishing the film Beyond the Forest. By 1949, the studio's net profit had fallen to $10,000,000.00, and the studio would soon suffer more losses with the rise of television.

In 1949, Warner, seeing the threat of television grow, decided to shift his focus towards television production. However, the Federal Communications Commission would not allow Warner to do so. After an unsuccessful attempt to convince other movie studio bosses to switch their focus to television, he abandoned his television efforts. As the threat of television grew in the early 1950s, Warner's younger brother, Jack, decided to try a new approach to help regain profits for the studio. In the wake of United Artists' successful 3-D film Bwana Devil, Jack decided to expand into 3-D films with the studio's film House of Wax (1953). While the film proved successful for the studio, 3-D films soon lost their appeal among moviegoers. After the downfall of 3-D films, Warner decided to use CinemaScope in future Warner Bros. films. One of the studio's first CinemaScope films, The High and Mighty, brought the studio some profit.

In 1954, Warner and his brother Jack were finally able to engage in the new television medium, providing ABC with a weekly show, Warner Bros. Presents. Warner Bros. Presents was not a success. In 1955, the studio was able to debut a very successful western television drama, Cheyenne The studio then followed up with a series of Western dramas such as Maverick, Bronco and Colt .45. The studio's television westerns, indeed, helped compensate for the net losses that the studio was now given at the box office Within a few years, Warner, who was accustomed to dealing with actors in a high-handed manner, provoked hostility among emerging television stars like James Garner, who filed a lawsuit against Warner Bros. over a contract dispute. Jack Warner was angered by the perceived ingratitude of television actors who seemed to show more independence than film actors, and this deepened his contempt for the new medium. Through this success, Warner began to be known as the "Strategic Generalissimo" by his employees.

By 1956, the studio's profits had dropped to new lows. Warner and Jack's tumultuous relationship worsened when Warner learned of Jack's decision to sell the Warner Bros.' pre-1949 films to Associated Artists Productions for the modest sum of $21 million. "This is our heritage, what we worked all our lives to create, and now it is gone," Warner exclaimed, upon hearing of the deal. Shortly after doing this, Jack took a long vacation in southern France. The brothers' fragile relationship had reached a new low.

== Retirement ==
In May 1956, the brothers announced they were putting Warner Bros. on the market. Jack, however, had secretly organized a syndicate, headed by Boston banker Serge Semenenko, which purchased 90% (800,000 shares) of the company's stock; At first Harry rejected Semenenko's earlier offer to purchase his stock in February 1956, but later accepted the offer after Semenenko increased his bid and agreed to make Simon Fabian—the head of Fabian Enterprises who had also become a friend of the Warners—president of Warner Bros. After the three brothers sold their stock, Jack (through his under-the-table deal with Sememenko) joined Semenenko's syndicate and bought back all his stock, which consisted of 200,000 shares. The deal was completed in July 1956. Jack, who was now the company's largest stockholder, named himself president.

Warner found out about Jack's dealing while reading an article in Variety on May 31, 1956 and collapsed after reading the news. The next day, he checked into Cedars of Lebanon Hospital and doctors told him he had a suffered a minor heart attack the previous day. While at the hospital, Warner had a stroke that impaired his walking ability and forced him to use a cane for the rest of his life. Six days after his stroke, he left the hospital and decided to sell 42 of his thoroughbred racehorses. The subterfuge proved too much for Warner and he and his family never spoke to Jack again; when Jack made a surprise appearance at Harry's San Fernando ranch, to attend Harry's 1957 wedding anniversary to Rea Levinson, nobody in the Warner family attending the event spoke to Jack. All Warner was now dedicated to doing was raising horses.

Shortly after that when Jack was away one day, Warner made one last visit to the studio to take US$6,000,000 (equivalent to about $66,955,020 in 2025) out of his old studio account. He gave $3 million to his wife Rea, and $1.5 million each to his two daughters Doris and Betty. In the meantime, he sold a large portion of the remaining studio stock he had to Semenenko and made sure he never came near the Burbank studio ever again.

== Personal life ==
On August 23, 1907, Warner married his girlfriend, Rea Levinson. It has been reported by family members that Harry dedicated a huge chunk of his life to make Rea happy. Harry and Rea had three children: Lewis Ethan (b. October 10, 1908), Doris (b. September 13, 1913), and Betty Leah (b. May 4, 1920). Harry and his family were also very faithful to Jewish customs and traditions.

On April 5, 1931, Warner's son Lewis, whom he appointed as head of Warner Bros. Music, died after he had an infected, impacted wisdom tooth extracted, which led to sepsis and then double pneumonia. After Lewis' death, Warner, who was now left without a recognized heir to his empire, descended into an extreme state of depression. In 1932, the Warners donated a theater in Lewis' honor to Worcester Academy, Lewis' alma mater. Warner also felt his brother Sam's widow, actress Lina Basquette, was a tramp and not worthy of raising a child with the last name Warner. While Jack didn't mind that Lina was Catholic, Harry and the rest of the Warner family did. They refused to have any part in Lina's life, and did not acknowledge her as being a member of the Warner clan.

In 1930, Basquette went broke and Warner decided to file for guardianship over Sam and Lina's daughter, Lita. On March 19, 1930, Warner and his wife Rea became the legal guardians of Lita through a $300,000 settlement in Lita's trust fund. Basquette was never financially able to take care of or regain custody of Lita and in 1931, she tried to commit suicide by poison. After her suicide attempt, Basquette only saw her daughter on two occasions in the next twenty years. In 1947, Basquette filed for a large share of Sam's estate, which was by now worth $15,000,000 in stocks alone. Basquette claimed that the Warner brothers reorganized Sam's will under New York statutes, while Sam died while living in California, where, at the time of Sam's death in 1927, laws gave widows a larger share in their husband's wills. The lawsuit eventually ended when Basquette settled for a $100,000 trust fund from Harry's fortune.

Warner's daughter, Doris, was married to director Mervyn LeRoy on January 3, 1934. Warner, with no male heir to his studio after Lewis died, made LeRoy his new heir to the Warner Bros. studio. Harry had two grandchildren, Warner Lewis LeRoy (1935-2001) and Linda LeRoy Janklow (b. 1939) (married to Morton L. Janklow) through Doris, his daughter. On one occasion, in the late 1930s, Doris read a copy of Margaret Mitchell's Gone With the Wind and became interested making a film adaption of the book for the studio as well; Doris then offered Mitchell $50,000 for the book's screen rights. However, Uncle Jack refused to allow the deal to take place, after seeing how expensive the film's budget would have been for the studio. The couple divorced on August 12, 1945, and Warner was left without an heir again. Two months after her divorce from LeRoy, Doris and director Charles Vidor got married. They had three sons, Michael, Brian and Quentin. Doris and Charles were married until his death in 1959.

In 1936, Betty Warner began an affair with one of Darryl F. Zanuck's assistants Milton Sperling. They married on July 13, 1939. Betty Warner and Milton Sperling had four children, Susan (b. December 4, 1941), Karen (b. April 8, 1945), and Cass (b. March 8, 1948), and Matthew. The two remained married for twenty-four years. In 1964, Betty married Stanley Sheinbaum. Her daughter, Cass Warner Sperling, and her husband, actor Wings Hauser were the parents of actor Cole Hauser.

== Death ==
Warner died on July 25, 1958, from a cerebral occlusion. Some people close to Harry, however, believed he died of a broken heart; Harry's wife Rea even stated, after Harry's funeral took place, that "he didn't die, Jack killed him." He left an estate valued at $6,000,000 with 50% bequeathed to his wife and 25% to each of his daughters, Doris and Betty (married to producer Milton Sperling). For his contributions to the motion picture industry, Harry Warner has a star on the Hollywood Walk of Fame at 6441 Hollywood Boulevard.

== Legacy ==
In 2004, Slippery Rock University in Slippery Rock, Pennsylvania dedicated a film institute to him. The university also hosts an annual Harry Warner film festival.

== In popular culture ==
- In an episode of Millionaire Hot Seat in Australia, contestant Barry Soraghan had a question for $1 million, which was about the Warner Brothers and which one of them had died on the eve of The Jazz Singer. Harry Warner was incorrectly identified as the Warner brother who died on the eve of The Jazz Singer (Sam was the correct answer).
