= Where the North Begins =

1923 film

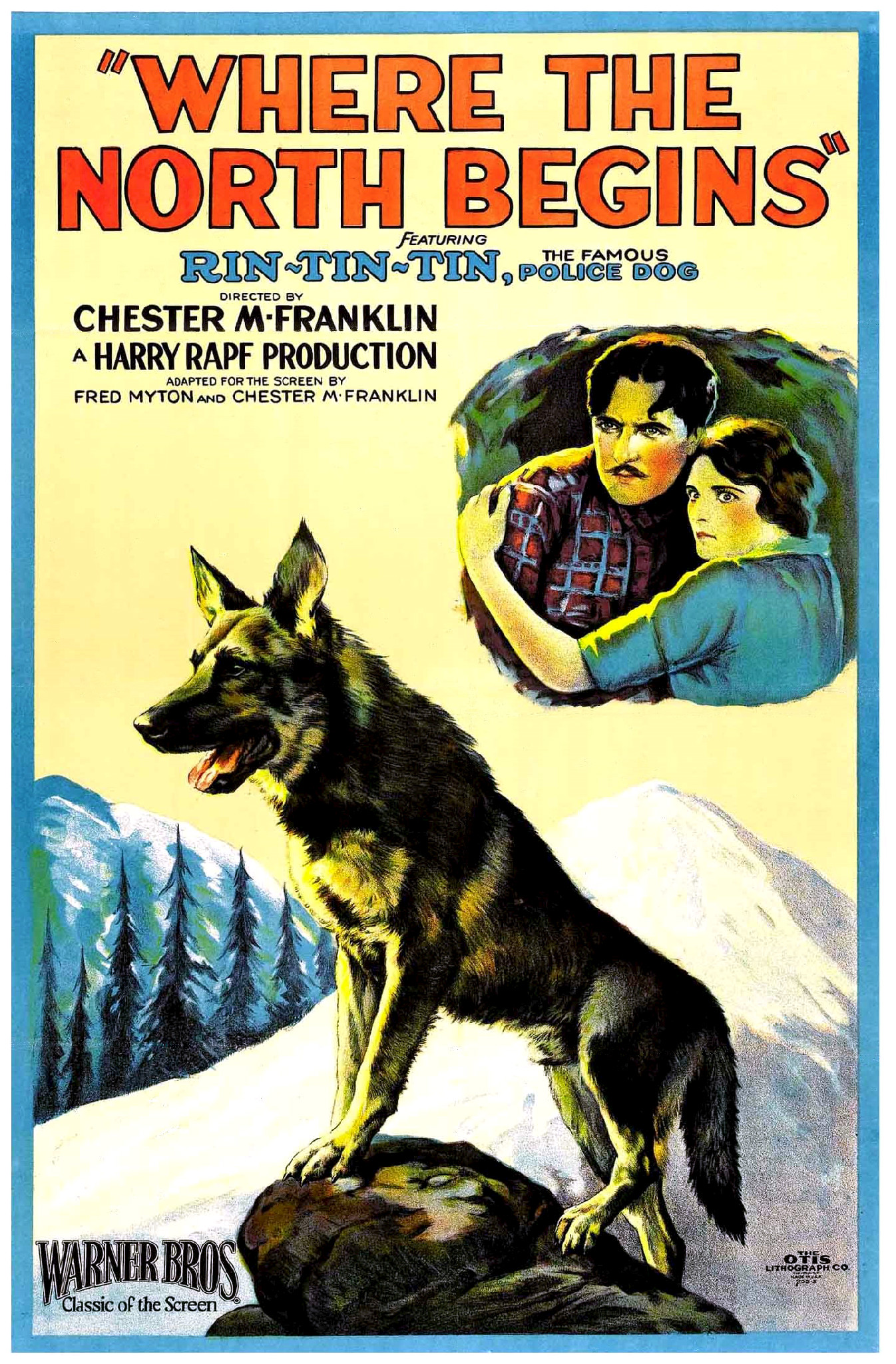
- Theatrical release poster
- Directed by: Chester M. Franklin
- Written by: Fred Myton; Chester M. Franklin
- Story by: Fred Myton; Millard Webb
- Produced by: Harry Rapf
- Starring: Claire Adams; Rin Tin Tin; Walter McGrail
- Edited by: Lewis Milestone
- Production company: Warner Bros.
- Distributed by: Warner Bros.
- Release date: July 1, 1923
- Running time: 60 minutes (6 reels)
- Country: United States
- Language: Silent (English intertitles)
- Budget: $73,000
- Box office: $441,000

Where the North Begins is a 1923 American silent drama film produced and distributed by Warner Bros. This was the third film for up-and-coming canine actor Rin Tin Tin. The film survives today and lapsed into the public domain on January 1, 2019, along with all remaining American works from 1923 that had not yet lapsed.

== Plot ==
A German Shepherd puppy ('the Wolf-Dog') is adopted by a wolf pack in the frozen far north of Canada. Several years later he becomes good friends with a French fur-trapper called Gabriel Dupre. Meanwhile, a corrupt trading post manager plots to get rid of Dupre and steal Dupre's sweetheart. The Wolf-Dog runs away after being falsely accused of attacking a baby, but his name is ultimately cleared and Dupre brings him back. Ultimately, the Wolf-Dog kills the villainous manager.

== Cast ==
- Claire Adams as Felice McTavish
- Rin Tin Tin as The Wolf-Dog
- Walter McGrail as Gabriel Dupre
- Pat Hartigan as Shad Galloway
- Myrtle Owen as Marie
- Charles Stevens as 'The Fox'
- Fred Huntley as Scotty McTavish

== Production ==
The full film

Warner Brothers decided to invest $100,000 in producing the screenplay as written by Rin Tin Tin's owner and trainer, Lee Duncan. Director Chester M. Franklin shot the film's exterior scenes in Canada but he stayed too long and shot too much footage, spending more than the budget. The negatives were processed in Hollywood and the Warner executives saw that the movie was wandering off script, with too much beautiful scenery and not enough plot development. Warner hired a second director, Millard Webb, to shoot the story in parallel with Franklin's effort. Editor Lewis Milestone recalled that he noticed unworkable continuity mistakes between the two directors such as actor Walter McGrail shot in two different locations but at the same time in the script. Milestone tried to avoid editing what he saw as a doomed film, but producer Harry Rapf insisted he finish it. Milestone stipulated that writer Julien Josephson join him in the cutting room; the two men spent months watching and memorizing all the film footage, and they rewrote and assembled the film in a documentary fashion, letting the available film elements tell the story.

Warner executives previewed the finished film but indicated sweeping changes before it was to be released. Milestone resisted this; he felt it worked well as it was. Milestone suggested to Rapf that the film be previewed locally with a test audience. Accordingly, the film was shown while the Warner executives waited outside; the response was very positive. Duncan and Rin Tin Tin were present at the theater's entrance greeting theatergoers as they left. The Warner executives asked Duncan if he knew the audience members and he said yes, he lived in the neighborhood. The test screening was thus considered flawed because of the likelihood of a sympathetic audience. Another screening was arranged in another location, without Duncan and the dog. This second test was a great success and the film was put in distribution exactly as Milestone and Josephson had reworked it.

== Box office ==
According to Warner Bros records, the film earned $396,000 domestically and $45,000 foreign.
