= Ann Warner =

American socialite and arts patron (c. 1908–1990)

- Ann Warner, on right, with Marlene Dietrich, 1939; photographed by Jean Howard
- Born: c. 1908
- Died: 8 March 1990 (aged 81–82); Los Angeles, California, U.S.
- Other names: Ann Boyar; Ann Page Alvarado; Ann Warner
- Occupations: Socialite, arts patron
- Known for: Subject of Salvador Dalí's Portrait of Mrs. Jack Warner; second wife of Jack L. Warner
- Spouses: Don Alvarado (divorced); Jack L. Warner (m. 1936; d. 1978)
- Children: 2, including Joy Page

Ann Warner (c. 1908 – March 8, 1990), also known as Ann Page and born Ann Boyar, was an American socialite and arts patron. A onetime aspiring actress in Los Angeles, she became widely known as the second wife of studio executive Jack L. Warner. Salvador Dalí painted her in the mid-1940s in the oil portrait Portrait of Mrs. Jack Warner (cat. no. P 665). Page was a prominent figure in Hollywood society and was named one of the ten best-dressed women in 1972.

== Early life and first marriage ==
Page moved from New Orleans to Los Angeles to pursue acting and early on used the stage name "Ann Page." She first married the actor Don Alvarado, with whom she had a daughter, the actress Joy Page, born in 1924. The couple later divorced.

== Marriage to Jack L. Warner ==
Page married Jack Warner on January 10, 1936, in Armonk Village, New York. The couple had one daughter, Barbara, and Warner became stepfather to Joy Page from her previous marriage.

As the wife of one of Hollywood's most powerful studio executives, Warner became a central figure in the entertainment industry's social circles during the 1940s and 1950s. Her social world included stars such as Marlene Dietrich and Lili Damita; a 1948 photograph published by The New Yorker shows Warner with Dietrich, Damita, and Jack Warner. Contemporary accounts describe Ann Warner as among Dietrich's close companions within Hollywood's discreet network of lesbian and bisexual actresses and friends, referred to by Dietrich as "the sewing circle."

== Fashion and arts patronage ==
Warner was noted for her refined taste and became a significant figure in fashion circles. According to Richard Gully, a former assistant to Jack Warner, she helped finance couturier Pierre Balmain's early fashion house and supported him by regularly wearing his designs.

In the mid-1940s, Salvador Dalí painted Warner in Portrait of Mrs. Jack Warner (also listed as Portrait of Ann Warner), an oil on canvas dated c. 1944 and catalogued as P 665. The work is held by the Morohashi Museum of Modern Art in Fukushima, Japan. The painting's provenance includes the Warners and later David Geffen, with subsequent auction sales in 1990 and 1996 before entering the Morohashi collection.

== Influence on Warner's career ==
Warner played a significant role in her husband's later career decisions. Contemporaries and biographers note that she urged Jack Warner to "slow down," which became a factor in his decision to sell a controlling block of Warner Bros. stock to Seven Arts Productions in November 1966 and move toward retirement.

After Warner was critically injured in a car accident in France in August 1958, tensions between Warner and her stepson Jack M. Warner escalated during the studio head's hospitalization. The already strained relationship between father and son ended soon afterward, with biographical accounts suggesting Warner's influence played a role in the family rift.

== Later years and death ==
Following Jack Warner's death in 1978, Warner inherited the bulk of his estate and continued to reside at the couple's Beverly Hills mansion. She remained active socially but became increasingly private in her final years.

Warner died on March 8, 1990, at Cedars-Sinai Medical Center in Los Angeles following an illness. Reports of her exact age varied, as birth records were unclear. Services were private and she was cremated. Retrospectives of Hollywood society note that she had become increasingly isolated in her later years.

== Legacy ==
Warner's legacy rests primarily on her role as a fashionable Hollywood hostess and her position within the entertainment industry's social elite during the Golden Age of Hollywood. Her image as the subject of Dalí's society portrait has been featured in accounts of the Warner family and Hollywood history. Coverage of her social circle and influence also appears in profiles of Warner and their confidant Richard Gully.
