= Gregory Orr =

Gregory Orr may refer to:

- Gregory Orr (filmmaker) (born 1954), American writer and director of documentary and fiction films
- Gregory Orr (poet) (born 1947), American poet
