= The Sewing Circle =

The Sewing Circle may refer to:

- Sewing Circle (Hollywood), a sapphist Hollywood clique from 1910–1969
- The Sewing Circle: Hollywood's Greatest Secret: Female Stars Who Loved Other Women, a 1995 book by Axel Madsen
- The Sewing Circle, a short story by Gorg Huff published in the 2004 anthology The Grantville Gazette

== See also ==
- Sewing circle, a social group which gathers to sew together
