= Heart of a Child (novel) =

1940 novel

- First edition
- Author: Phyllis Bottome
- Language: English
- Genre: Drama
- Publisher: Faber and Faber
- Publication date: 1940
- Publication place: United Kingdom
- Media type: Print

Heart of a Child is a 1940 novel by the British writer Phyllis Bottome. Set in the Tirol, Austria, it focuses on a boy and his pet Saint Bernard.

== Adaptation ==
In 1958 it was adapted into a film of the same title directed by Clive Donner and starring Jean Anderson, Donald Pleasence and Maureen Pryor.

== Bibliography ==
- Goble, Alan. The Complete Index to Literary Sources in Film. Walter de Gruyter, 1999.
- Jones, Amanda. Bringing Up War-Babies: The Wartime Child in Women’s Writing and Psychoanalysis at Mid-Century. Routledge, 2018.
