= Private Worlds =

1935 film by Gregory La Cava

- Directed by: Gregory La Cava
- Written by: Gregory La Cava; Lynn Starling
- Based on: Private Worlds by Phyllis Bottome
- Produced by: Walter Wanger
- Starring: Claudette Colbert; Charles Boyer; Joel McCrea; Joan Bennett; Helen Vinson
- Cinematography: Leon Shamroy
- Edited by: Aubrey Scotto
- Music by: Heinz Roemheld (uncredited)
- Production company: Paramount Pictures
- Distributed by: Paramount Pictures
- Release date: April 19, 1935
- Running time: 84 minutes
- Country: United States
- Language: English
- Budget: $435,032
- Box office: $819,118

Private Worlds is a 1935 American drama film which tells the story of the staff and patients at a mental hospital and the chief of the hospital, who has problems dealing with a female psychiatrist. The film stars Claudette Colbert, Charles Boyer, Joel McCrea, Joan Bennett, and Helen Vinson.

The movie was written by Phyllis Bottome, Gregory La Cava, and Lynn Starling and was directed by La Cava. Cinematographer Leon Shamroy used early zoom lenses to create special effects for the film.

Claudette Colbert was nominated for the Academy Award for Best Actress for the film.

The film is based on the 1934 novel of the same title by British writer Phyllis Bottome, who has had several of her works transferred to film, such as The Mortal Storm (MGM, 1940).

== Plot ==
The film tells of problems in the lives of doctors and patients. A female doctor (Colbert) probes the twisted minds of her patients in a mental institution. The very caring psychiatrist and her colleague face discrimination by a conservative new supervisor.

== Cast ==
- Claudette Colbert as Dr. Jane Everest
- Charles Boyer as Dr. Charles Monet
- Joan Bennett as Sally MacGregor
- Helen Vinson as Claire Monet
- Joel McCrea as Dr. Alex MacGregor
- Jean Rouverol as Carrie Flint
- Esther Dale as Matron
- Guinn 'Big Boy' Williams as Jerry
- Dora Clement as Bertha Hirst
- Sam Godfrey as Tom Hirst
- Samuel S. Hinds as Dr. Arnold
- Theodore von Eltz as Dr. Harding
- Stanley Andrews as Dr. Barnes

== Reception ==
The film had a loss of $10,458.
