= William T. Orr =

American actor and producer (1917–2002)

- Born: William Ferdinand Quinn, Jr. September 27, 1917; New York City, U.S.
- Died: December 25, 2002 (aged 85); Los Angeles, California, U.S.
- Resting place: Forest Lawn Memorial Park (Hollywood Hills)
- Occupations: film and television producer actor
- Years active: 1930s–1970s
- Spouse: Joy Page (m. 1945; div. 1970)
- Children: 2, including Gregory Orr
- Awards: Golden Boot Award, 2002

William T. Orr (born William Ferdinand Quinn Jr.; September 27, 1917 – December 25, 2002) was an American actor and television producer associated with various Western and detective programs of the 1950s-1970s. In most of his Warner Bros. series, he was billed as "Wm. T. Orr." Orr began his career as an actor; his film credits included The Mortal Storm, The Gay Sisters, and The Big Street.

== Early years ==
Orr was the son of William Ferdinand Quinn, a stockbroker and alderman, and Gladys Quinn (née Turney), an actress, formerly Herrmann, later Orr, later Hall. The Quinns divorced in 1923. Gladys later married two more times, including to Morrison Boal Orr, "heir to the Orr Felt & Blanket Company fortune". After the marriage, the son became known as William Turney Orr. He had a half-sister, Maury, who later worked as a TV director.

Orr was educated at the Coburn School in Miami, Rumsey Hall School, and Phillips Exeter Academy. In 1934, he was elected as a member of the Christian Fraternity Cabinet, "a board of twelve students prominent in school activities" at Phillips Exeter". When he was 18, he moved with his half-sister and his divorced mother to Los Angeles. He worked as a model, studied acting with Ben Bard, and performed in some plays. An agent arranged a screen test for Orr, but it was unsuccessful.

== Acting career ==
Orr imitated celebrities in Bard's revue, Hit Parade, (1938) and acted in George and Margaret at the Little Theatre for Professionals of Beverly Hills. He appeared in another revue, Meet the People, in Los Angeles, and portrayed a romantic interest of Ann Rutherford's character in The Hardys Ride High (1939).

Warner Bros. signed Orr to a $300-per-week contract, but he acted more for other studios when he was loaned out than he did for Warner Bros. He primarily made short films for his home studio, while he appeared in nearly 20 films overall from 1938 to 1943.

During World War II he was an officer in the Army Air Force. He was assigned to the First Motion Picture Unit, and he appeared in training films.

== Production career ==
As the first head of Warner Bros. Television department, Orr forged a fruitful alliance with ABC, which resulted in the network having a number of prime time hits, such as Maverick, 77 Sunset Strip, and F Troop. At the height of this relationship in the early 1960s, Orr had nine programs in prime time simultaneously.

Of these, though, no program was more significant than one of his earliest, Cheyenne. It was a groundbreaking series that was both the first hour-long western and the first series of any kind made by a major Hollywood film studio consisting entirely of content wholly exclusive to television.

Randy Cassingham, a curator at The Paley Center for Media (previously The Museum of Television and Radio) once encapsulated Orr's importance to Warner Bros. by saying, "Television began as a step-child. But because of Orr, it became equal with film in creating revenue and jobs for the studio." One of the key reforms he made to effect this change was to move Warner's nascent television department from cramped quarters in New York City to Los Angeles studios separate from the film division.

Orr's responsibilities at Warner Bros. expanded on February 28, 1961, when he was named vice president in charge of motion pictures in addition to continuing his duties with TV programs.

Despite broadly positive posthumous recognition for his work as a whole, Orr did receive negative press during the height of his career—as well as afterwards—for his business practices. Time Magazine characterized Orr and Jack Warner as co-architects of unfair contracts during late-1950s pay disputes waged by Warner Bros. star television actors Clint Walker, James Garner, and Edd Byrnes. Orr's series were also noted for the cost-saving practice of recycling scripts from one series to another, switching only character names; during a writers' strike, such repurposed scripts were credited to "W. Hermanos".

Orr's star dimmed by 1963, as almost all of his series had run their course and had been cancelled. In 1963, towards the end of the 5th season, Jack Webb replaced Orr as executive producer of ABC's 77 Sunset Strip detective series. For the 6th season, Webb completely changed the theme song and format and retained only Efrem Zimbalist Jr. in the role of Stuart Bailey. The revision was a disaster, and the program was cancelled even prior to the end of the sixth season.

Orr was hired by Frank Sinatra's Essex Productions and continued as a television producer through 1966, including a stint as the executive producer of the first season of F Troop. After 1966, his only production credit was on the 1973 film Wicked, Wicked.

== Personal life and death ==
Orr married Jack L. Warner's stepdaughter Joy Page in 1945. The couple divorced in 1970. They had a daughter, Diane, and their son Gregory Orr is a writer and producer.

A stroke left Orr unable to speak or walk. On December 25, 2002, Orr died of natural causes at his home in Los Angeles. He was buried at the Forest Lawn Memorial Park in Hollywood Hills, Los Angeles.

== Honours ==
In 1994, a Golden Palm Star on the Palm Springs, California, Walk of Stars was dedicated to him. In August 2002, Orr was named as a recipient of a Golden Boot Award for his involvement with Western productions.

An elementary school and street in Norwalk, California, are named for him.

== Filmography ==
Year	Title	Role	Notes
1938	Touchdown, Army	Cadet Beale	Uncredited
1938	Brother Rat	Member of the Guard	Uncredited
1939	The Hardys Ride High	Dick Bannersly	
1939	Invitation to Happiness	Bellboy	Uncredited
1940	Those Were the Days!	Minor Role	Uncredited
1940	The Mortal Storm	Erich Von Rohn	
1940	My Love Came Back	Paul Malette	
1941	Honeymoon for Three	Arthur Westlake	
1941	Thieves Fall Out	George Formsby	
1941	Three Sons o' Guns	Kenneth Patterson	
1941	Navy Blues	Mac	
1941	Unholy Partners	Thomas 'Tommy' Jarvis - an alias of Tommy Jarrett	
1942	The Gay Sisters	Dick Tone	
1942	The Big Street	Decatur Reed	
1943	He Hired the Boss	Don Bates	
