= Conquest of Cochise =

1953 film by William Castle

- Film poster
- Directed by: William Castle
- Screenplay by: Arthur Lewis; DeVallon Scott
- Story by: DeVallon Scott
- Produced by: Sam Katzman
- Starring: John Hodiak; Robert Stack; Joy Page
- Cinematography: Henry Freulich
- Edited by: Al Clark
- Color process: Technicolor
- Production company: Columbia Pictures
- Distributed by: Columbia Pictures
- Release date: September 1953
- Running time: 71 minutes
- Country: United States
- Language: English

Conquest of Cochise is a 1953 American Western film set in 1853 at the time of the Gadsden Purchase. Produced by Sam Katzman and directed by William Castle, it stars John Hodiak, Robert Stack and Joy Page.

== Plot ==
Army Major Tom Burke is assigned to lead four troops of cavalry dragoons into Tucson in the Gadsden Purchase, recently acquired by the United States from Mexico. Both the Apache, led by Cochise, and Comanche Indian tribes are at war with the Mexican population. In addition to the three stakeholders, Major Burke faces a treacherous businessman whose profits from selling alcohol to all parties is threatened by the prospect of peace.

== Cast ==
- John Hodiak as Cochise
- Robert Stack as Maj. Tom Burke
- Joy Page as Consuelo de Cordova
- Rico Alaniz as Felipe
- Fortunio Bonanova as Mexican Minister
- Edward Colmans as Don Francisco de Cordova
- Alex Montoya as Jose Garcia
- Steven Ritch as Tukiwah
- Carol Thurston as Terua
- Rodd Redwing as Red Knife
- Robert Griffin as Sam Maddock (as Robert E. Griffin)
- Poppy del Vando as Señora de Cordova

== Production ==
The film was shot at Santa Clarita, California, Corriganville movie ranch and the Vasquez Rocks Natural Area Park in Agua Dulce, California.

William Castle says Katzman insisted Indians wear bathing caps to indicate they had shaved their heads in order to save money.
