= Phyllis Bottome =

British writer (1882–1963)

- Bottome, circa 1932
- Born: 31 May 1882; Rochester, United Kingdom
- Died: 22 August 1963 (aged 81); London
- Occupation: writer
- Spouse: Alban Ernan Forbes Dennis
- Writing career
- Genres: novels, nonfiction
- Notable works: The Dark Tower, The Mortal Storm

Phyllis Forbes Dennis (née Bottome /bəˈtoʊm/ bə-TOHM; 31 May 1882 – 22 August 1963) was a British novelist and short story writer. The Oxford Dictionary of National Biography said of her, "In her long career Bottome wrote on a wide range of subjects in several genres, producing popular, feminist novels and, in her non-fiction, raising the public's awareness of political dangers; her recurring theme was personal freedom."

== Life and career ==
Bottome was born in 1882, in Rochester, Kent, the daughter of an American clergyman, Rev. William MacDonald Bottome, and an Englishwoman, Mary (Leatham) Bottome. (Note: Some sources gives 1884 as the year of birth, but Bottome's autobiography Search for A Soul says, "I was born on the night when May turns into June in the year 1882".)

In 1901, following the death of her sister Wilmett from tuberculosis, Bottome was diagnosed with the same disease. She travelled to St Moritz in the hope that this would improve her health as mountain air was perceived as better for patients with tuberculosis.

In 1917, in Paris, she married Alban Ernan Forbes Dennis, a British diplomat working, first, in Marseilles and then in Vienna as Passport Control Officer, a cover for his real role as MI6 Head of Station with responsibility for Austria, Hungary and Yugoslavia. They had met in 1904 at a villa in St Moritz, where Bottome was lodging.

Bottome studied individual psychology under Alfred Adler, and was his patient, while in Vienna. Later, in 1939, she wrote a biography of him (Alfred Adler: Apostle of Freedom) at his behest: in her preface she writes, "I fully realize my lack of qualifications in undertaking the great task of writing Adler's life; but it was a task laid upon me by Adler himself."

In 1924 she and her husband started a school in Kitzbühel in Austria. Based on the teaching of languages, the school was intended to be a community and an educational laboratory to determine how psychology and educational theory could cure the ills of nations. One of their more famous pupils was Ian Fleming, author of the James Bond novels. In 1960, Fleming wrote to Bottome, "My life with you both is one of my most cherished memories, and heaven knows where I should be today without Ernan." It has been argued that Fleming took the idea of James Bond from the character Mark Chalmers in Bottome's spy novel The Lifeline. Other pupils at Kitzbühel who went on to become authors included Ralph Arnold, Cyril Connolly (who wrote about his time there in The Unquiet Grave), and Nigel Dennis.

In 1935, her novel Private Worlds was made into a film of the same title. Set in a psychiatric clinic, Bottome's knowledge of individual psychology proved useful in creating a realistic scene. Bottome saw her share of trouble with Danger Signal, which the Hays Office forbade from becoming a Hollywood film.

Germany became Bottome's home in the late 1930s, and it inspired her novel The Mortal Storm, the film of which was the first to mention Hitler's name and be set in Nazi Germany, and openly criticized the Nazi regime. Film historian Pam Hirsch wrote, "Bottome's novel had unflinchingly shown the effects of the rise of Nazism, and also, to some extent, helped to explain why Jews had not immediately left Germany in the face of rising Nazi persecution." Bottome was an active anti-fascist. A New York Times report Bottome's visit to the city in October 1938 said, "The present government of Great Britain, according to Miss Bottome, is definitely pro-Nazi. She charged that Mr. Chamberlain had brought back from Germany dishonor without peace and that war would occur as soon as Germany asked for something Great Britain 'really wants.'"

In total, four of her works—Private Worlds, The Mortal Storm, Danger Signal, and The Heart of a Child—were adapted to film.

Bottome died in London on 22 August 1963. Forbes Dennis would die in July 1972 in Brighton.

There is a large collection of her literary papers and correspondence in the British Library acquired in 2000 (Add MSS 78832-78903). A second tranche, consisting of correspondence and literary manuscripts, was acquired by the British Library in 2005. The British Library also holds the Phyllis Bottome/Hodder-Salmon Papers consisting of correspondence, papers and press cuttings relating to Bottome.

== Books ==
She wrote her first novel when she was just seventeen.

- Life, the Interpreter, 1902
- The Master Hope, 1904
- The Dark Tower, 1916
- The Second Fiddle, 1917
- The Derelict, 1917 (U.S.), 1923 (U.K.)
- Helen of Troy and Rose, 1918, The Century Company
- A Servant of Reality, 1919
- Kingfisher, 1922
- The Victim, and The Worm, 1923
- The Perfect Wife, 1924
- Life of Olive Schreiner, 1924
- Old Wine, 1925
- The Belated Reckoning, 1926
- The Messenger of the Gods — The Story of a Girl of Today, 1927, George H. Doran Company
- The Rat, 1927, George H. Doran Company. Novelization of the 1924 play by Ivor Novello and Constance Collier
- Strange Fruit: Stories, 1928
- Windlestraws, 1929
- The Advances of Harriet, 1933
- Private Worlds, 1934
- Level Crossing, 1936
- The Mortal Storm, Oct 1937
- Alfred Adler: Apostle of Freedom (1939)
- Danger Signal, 1939 (original title: Murder in the Bud)
- Masks and Faces, 1940
- Formidable to Tyrants, 1941
- London Pride, 1941. A boy's experience of the Blitz and the Second World War. His family are separated by evacuation and a bombing raid destroys their home. After another raid he is injured and evacuated away from London.
- Mansion House of Liberty, 1941
- Heart of a Child, 1942
- Within the Cup, 1943
- Survival, 1943
- From the Life, 1944, London, Faber & Faber. Six studies of the author's friends Alfred Adler, Max Beerbohm, Ivor Novello, Sara Delano Roosevelt, Ezra Pound, Margaret MacDonald Bottome.
- The Lifeline, 1946
- Innocence and Experience, 1947
- Search for a Soul, 1947
- Fortune's Finger, 1950
- Under the Skin – Love Drew no Color Line when a White Woman entered a Negro's World, 1950
- The Challenge, 1953
- The Secret Stair, 1954
- Against Whom? 1954. By chance a patient is brought to a sanatorium on the verge of death. How he not only recovers but manages to influence the lives of the scientists who have observed him is the subject of this novel. In the course of the book the principal characters find either that they must think of others and put that thought into practise or that those same 'others' will become their enemy and destroy, one by one, his most intimate relationships.
- Eldorado Jane, 1956
- Walls of Glass, 1958
- The Goal, 1962. Her autobiography.
- Our New Order or Hitler's? A Selection of Speeches by Winston Churchill, Archbishop of Canterbury, Anthony Eden & Others, ed. by Ph. Bottome, Penguin Books Middlesex, 1943
