= Danger Signal =

1945 film by Robert Florey

- Theatrical release poster
- Directed by: Robert Florey
- Screenplay by: C. Graham Baker; Adele Comandini
- Based on: Danger Signal; 1939 novel by Phyllis Bottome
- Produced by: William Jacobs
- Starring: Faye Emerson; Zachary Scott
- Cinematography: James Wong Howe
- Edited by: Frank Magee
- Music by: Adolph Deutsch
- Distributed by: Warner Bros. Pictures
- Release date: November 14, 1945 (United States)
- Running time: 78 minutes
- Country: United States
- Language: English
- Budget: $471,000
- Box office: $1,110,000

Danger Signal is a 1945 American film noir starring Faye Emerson and Zachary Scott. The screenplay was adapted from the 1939 novel of the same name by Phyllis Bottome.

== Plot ==
A mysterious pulp writer—and psychopath—named Ronnie Mason, steals a dead woman's wedding ring and money and leaves a fake suicide note. The woman's husband, Thomas Turner, when questioned by the local police, believes his dead wife might have been seeing Mason behind his back. He also believes his wife was murdered, but in the absence of other evidence, the police list it as a suicide and drop the case.

Mason leaves town, changes his name to Marsh and, displaying a noticeable limp he acquired jumping from the dead woman's bedroom window and a veteran's pin he steals from a fellow passenger on the L.A. bus, passes himself off as a wounded veteran and rents a room in a house Mrs. Fenchurch shares with her elder daughter Hilda, a public stenographer, and the teenaged Anne. All three women are extremely impressionable, and to the consternation of Professor Andrew Lang, who secretly loves Hilda, the girls fall for Marsh's charms.

Hilda and Marsh get involved, even spend a weekend retreat together --- financed by the earnest, thrifty Hilda. Marsh claims to be broke, awaiting his first sale, but conceals it when the MacLellen Publishing Company sends him $200 for his short story "Dark Island," to be published in the next issue of Adventure Tales magazine.

Hilda sees visions of marriage straight ahead. When Marsh learns that Anne might inherit a great deal of money, he drops Hilda cold and secretly takes up with Anne. Eventually the truth comes out about them. Hilda is both jealous and suspicious, enough so that she plots to lure Marsh to a beach house and poison him. She is unable to go through with it, but when Marsh runs off, he is surprised by Turner, who has tracked him down. Recognizing him, he runs away, tripping and plunging off a steep cliff to his death.

Bunkie reunites with Anne in his new midshipman uniform. Dr. Lang rings the doorbell with flowers in hand to surprise Hilda, hoping for a date. He interrupts her typing upstairs. When she demurs because of "work," he reminds her she is busy doing steno work for him, and demands she accept his invitation to a concert, which she does. Downstairs, Bunkie asks Anne out and then kisses her.

== Cast ==
- Faye Emerson as Hilda Fenchurch
- Zachary Scott as Ronnie Mason / Marsh
- Richard Erdman as Bunkie Taylor (as Dick Erdman)
- Rosemary DeCamp as Dr. Jane Silla
- Bruce Bennett as Dr. Andrew Lang
- Mona Freeman as Anne Fenchurch
- John Ridgely as Thomas Turner
- Mary Servoss as Mrs. Fenchurch
- Joyce Compton as Kate
- Virginia Sale as Mrs. Crockett

== Reception ==
Bosley Crowther, the film critic for The New York Times, panned the film, describing it a "diluted little melodrama" in which the filmmakers resort to a car chase in order to relieve boredom. In the Bottome novel, Hilda does indeed poison Marsh. Warner Bros., however, thought it improper for Faye Emerson, the daughter-in-law of President Franklin D. Roosevelt by her marriage to Elliott Roosevelt, to portray a murderess.

=== Box office ===
According to financial accounts at Warner Bros., the film was a box-office success, earning $689,000 domestically and $421,000 internationally.
