= Heart of a Child =

1958 British film by Clive Donner

- British theatrical poster
- Directed by: Clive Donner
- Written by: Leigh Vance
- Based on: Heart of a Child by Phyllis Bottome
- Produced by: Alfred Shaughnessy
- Starring: Jean Anderson; Donald Pleasence
- Cinematography: Peter Hennessy
- Edited by: John Trumper
- Music by: Bruce Montgomery
- Production company: Beaconsfield Productions
- Distributed by: J. Arthur Rank Film Distributors (UK)
- Release date: April 1958
- Running time: 73 min.
- Country: United Kingdom
- Language: English

Heart of a Child is a 1958 British second feature ('B') drama film directed by Clive Donner and starring Jean Anderson and Donald Pleasence. It was adapted by Leigh Vance from the 1940 novel of the same title by Phyllis Bottome.

== Plot ==
During wartime rationing, Karl, a young Austrian boy, is beaten by his father, Spiel, who threatens to sell the boy's St. Bernard dog to the butcher to pay for food for the family. However, much to the father's fury, Karl sells the dog himself to a kindly veterinarian. The dog, with the help of Maria, a spinster, then rescues Karl after he is trapped in a snowstorm. Maria ends up marrying the vet, and Karl's father ends up letting Karl keep the dog.

== Cast ==
- Jean Anderson as Maria
- Donald Pleasence as Spiel
- Richard Williams as Karl
- Maureen Pryor as Frau Spiel
- Norman MacOwan as Heiss
- John Glyn-Jones as Priest
- Willoughby Goddard as Stott
- Andrew Keir as Constable
- John Boxer as Breuer
- Carla Challoner as Elsa

== Production ==
It was the second feature film directed by Clive Donner, who had turned down two films after his debut The Secret Place.

Filming started September 1957 and took place in Austria and at Beaconsfield Studios. Alfred Shaugnessy who produced said it was made by the "Box organisation". He called it "a very sentimental story in what I would call ‘Lassie’ territory" and claimed he took over directing for ten days when Donner came down with the flu, although says Donner reshot most of this.

According to Donner they reshot the ending twice at the request of Earl St John who was dissatisfied with it; then Sydney Box wrote another ending and that was used. Donner said the film "was not a happy experience" even though there was location work in Austria.

== Reception ==
Donner said "I don't think it did as great business as it could have done because sentimentality of that sort is something I wasn't right for and I think I was fighting it. If I'd really gone for broke I think I would've done big, big business."

After watching the film Bottome said Donner had "done an excellent job. The spirit and the characters have been kept—and that’s what counts.”

The Monthly Film Bulletin wrote: "This conventional boy-loves-dog story appears something of a retreat for the director, Clive Donner. His first film, The Secret Place, in itself a not very original East End crime story, revealed a promising talent for characterisation and realistic settings, freshly observed. Heart of a Child, with its mainly platitudinous dialogue and somewhat vague sense of time and place, lacks these virtues. Spiel, rather theatrically played by Donald Pleasence, never comes convincingly to life, and it is difficult to hold confidence in his abrupt reformation so soon after beating his son about the head with a log, and then refusing to help save his life when he is trapped in the snow. The boy is characterised with almost Dickensian sentimentality, and inexpertly played by Richard Williams. However, if young audiences can accept the happy ending without question, then they are not likely to be unduly critical of the somewhat inflexible direction and the heavily insistent music score. Jean Anderson acts with firm sympathy; and Rudi, the St. Bernard, is undoubtedly the film's best friend."

Filmink argued "who wants to see Donald Pleasance [sic] soften at the love of a boy for his dog?"

In British Sound Films: The Studio Years 1928–1959 David Quinlan rated the film as "average", writing: "Heavily made tear-jerker doesn't touch the emotions."
