= Private Worlds (Bottome novel) =

1934 novel

- First US edition
- Author: Phyllis Bottome
- Language: English
- Genre: Drama
- Publisher: Harmondsworth (UK); Houghton Mifflin (US)
- Publication date: 1934
- Publication place: United Kingdom
- Media type: Print

Private Worlds is a 1934 novel by the British writer Phyllis Bottome. It is set in a psychiatric hospital. It was the seventh most popular work of fiction published in America that year.

== Adaptation ==
It was adapted into a 1935 American film of the same title directed by Gregory La Cava and starring Claudette Colbert, Charles Boyer and Joel McCrea.

== Bibliography ==
- Goble, Alan. The Complete Index to Literary Sources in Film. Walter de Gruyter, 1999.
- Hayward, Rhodri. The Transformation of the Psyche in British Primary Care, 1870-1970. A&C Black, 2014.
- Kimyongür, Angela. Women in Europe between the Wars: Politics, Culture and Society. Routledge, 2017.
