= The Mortal Storm (novel) =

1937 novel

- First US edition
- Author: Phyllis Bottome
- Language: English
- Genre: Drama
- Publisher: Faber and Faber (UK); Little, Brown (US)
- Publication date: 1937
- Publication place: United Kingdom
- Media type: Print

The Mortal Storm is a 1937 novel by the British writer Phyllis Bottome. An anti-Nazi novel, it depicts the impact of Adolf Hitler's regime on a German family, and their conversion to resistance against the Third Reich. Bottome had visited Germany and Austria regularly in the 1930s and spoke fluent German.

Her novel was well received and sold well. But Caroline Moorehead points out that the book was heavily indebted to the earlier novels Crooked Cross (1934) and The Prisoner (1936) by Sally Carson, and overshadowed those books due to its success. "The Mortal Storm not only traces an almost identical plot [to The Prisoner] but is uncannily similar in tone and style. How did no one notice?"

== Film adaptation ==
In 1940 it was made into the film The Mortal Storm by the Hollywood studio MGM, directed by Frank Borzage and starring Margaret Sullavan, James Stewart and Robert Young.

== Bibliography ==
- Goble, Alan. The Complete Index to Literary Sources in Film. Walter de Gruyter, 1999.
- Spiro, Mia. Anti-Nazi Modernism: The Challenges of Resistance in 1930s Fiction. Northwestern University Press, 2012.
