= Gregory Orr (filmmaker) =

American film director

- Born: August 6, 1954 (age 71); Los Angeles
- Occupations: Filmmaker, director

Gregory William Orr (born 6 August 1954) is an American writer and director of documentary and fiction films. He is the son of actress Joy Page and TV producer William T. Orr, and step-grandson of Jack L. Warner, one of the Warner Brothers.

== Career ==
Orr attended Boston University and the California Institute of the Arts, where he studied under film director Alexander Mackendrick.

In 1993 Orr produced his first documentary, Jack L. Warner: The Last Mogul, a feature-length biography of his mother's stepfather, the movie pioneer Jack L. Warner.

Orr's other films include Parole: Prison Without Bars (2000), The Day They Died (2003), Alone (2004, short), and Recreator (2011). As Recreator, later entitled, Cloned: The Recreator Chronicles (2012), marked the filmmaker's debut in feature-length, psychological thrillers.
