= London Pride (novel) =

1941 novel

- First US edition
- Author: Phyllis Bottome
- Language: English
- Genre: Drama
- Publisher: Faber and Faber (UK); Little, Brown (US)
- Publication date: 1941
- Publication place: United Kingdom
- Media type: Print

London Pride is a 1941 novel by the British writer Phyllis Bottome. It takes place in wartime London and follows an East End family during the height of The Blitz during the summer of 1940. It is seen through the eyes of a seven-year-old boy Ben, named after Big Ben, whose mother is a charwoman and his father is a docker. During the novel his neighbours are killed in an air raid and his own house bombed before he is eventually evacuated to the countryside at the conclusion.

== Bibliography ==
- Calder, Robert L. Beware the British Serpent: The Role of Writers in British Propaganda in the United States, 1939-1945. McGill-Queen's Press, 2004.
- Welsh, Dave. Underground Writing: The London Tube from George Gissing to Virginia Woolf. Liverpool University Press, 2010.
