= Thieves Fall Out =

1941 film by Ray Enright

- Theatrical release poster
- Directed by: Ray Enright
- Screenplay by: Charles Grayson; Ben Markson
- Based on: Thirty Days Hath September; 1938 play by Irving Gaumont; Jack Sobell
- Produced by: Bryan Foy
- Starring: Eddie Albert; Joan Leslie; Jane Darwell; Alan Hale, Sr. William T. Orr; John Litel
- Cinematography: Sidney Hickox
- Edited by: Clarence Kolster
- Music by: Heinz Roemheld
- Production company: Warner Bros. Pictures
- Distributed by: Warner Bros. Pictures
- Release date: May 3, 1941
- Running time: 72 minutes
- Country: United States
- Language: English

Thieves Fall Out is a 1941 American comedy film directed by Ray Enright and starring Eddie Albert and Joan Leslie, with Jane Darwell, Alan Hale, Sr., William T. Orr, and John Litel in support. Written by Charles Grayson and Ben Markson, the B-film was released by Warner Bros. Pictures on May 3, 1941.

== Plot ==
Eddie Barnes is employed by his father, Rodney, owner of the prosperous Barnes Slumber Accessories Company, at a menial, low-paying position. Eddie, who still lives at home with his parents, is deeply in love with Mary Matthews, the daughter of Charles Matthews, Rodney's chief but unfriendly (and even wealthier) competitor. Lacking the financial means to marry, and fearing that Mary will leave him for a rich, annoying, and disrespectful rival, Eddie implores his father for a pay raise, but is denied.

In a bid to secure his future with Mary, Eddie decides to sell a full future interest in a $100,000 legacy he is to inherit from his late maternal Grandfather Allen upon his mother's death in order to purchase a business. To minimize the risk involved (in laying out cash against a future payout) the broker he approaches insists Eddie be married and a father before committing to the deal. Eddie is given two months to manage both steep requirements.

Following the advice of his spunky, congenitally buttinsky maternal Grandmother to act like his impetuous and successful Grandfather, Eddie sweeps Mary off her feet, elopes with her, and in spite of objections from her parents to all aspects of it, the couple moves in with Mr. and Mrs. Barnes. The outraged and imperious Mr. Barnes compounds the upheaval by vowing angrily he will come retrieve Mary in two months if both he and she are not completely satisfied with her new life.

Meanwhile, the broker sells a half-interest in his business to a notorious local gangster, Chic Collins.

The days fly by, but Mary does not become pregnant – and it's all too rushed, anyway. Still, the deadline and its requirements loom. So does the closing date on the business deal. On the very last day before both expire Grandma Allen sees Mary knitting a baby top, and is able to convince both Eddie and the broker a child is on the way. Overwhelmed in the high-spirits of the announcement, the dour broker consents to honoring his half the deal (without a child actually being born). Eddie gets his money – a mere $0.33 cents on the dollar, but enough to meet the $31,000 business price and get going.

The company makes springs – and has both the Barnes and Matthews mattress firms as customers. The previous owner had made a bad deal on a large government contract (patriotically offering to manufacture a custom spring at his cost, without making a profit). It was just too much, requiring expensive retooling the company could not afford, so it folded. To not lose that still-pending business yet be able to move forward, Eddie jacks prices sharply for both fathers' companies, neither of whom has an alternative supplier. Indignantly submitting to the gouging the men get twice as outraged when they learn it is Eddie behind it. Though over a barrel, each however recognizes the initiative in what Eddie's doing that they both craved but did not believe was in him.

Everything is going swimmingly with Eddie, Mary, and their business. The legacy broker, however, a swindler beneath a respectable façade, sells out the rest of his company to Collins, who is intent on using it for blackmail and extortion. Recognizing the wealth on both sides of Eddie and Mary's families, he decides to lean hard on Eddie and squeeze more money out of him. It comes in the form of a threat to his mother's life, as if she dies Collins gets all $100,000 coming to him immediately. But, if Eddie wants to "protect" her from any possible misfortune, he can take out an "insurance policy" by buying back his future inheritance for "just" $75,000. Obviously he does not have that kind of money himself, and trying to explain it all – and get help from both sets of parents while confessing that not only is he faced with paying $108,000 in all for his $100,000 legacy but has put his mother's life in the hands of dangerous gangsters – will not go over well.

Collins and his top henchman make a surprise appearance at the Barnes home to force the issue, where it readily comes out that Eddie had ulterior motives – no matter the purity of his heart – in proposing to Mary and plunging towards parenthood. Mary reveals she'd been knitting the top for another friend's baby shower, and is appalled at Eddie's deception, and what she believes it reveals about him. Her father escorts her sobbing back to their home. She takes up with the rival suitor.

Grandma comes to the "rescue" again. Due to confusion, Chick thinks she is Eddie's mother, not his real one. Grandma proposes to Eddie that she fake an accident in front of Collins' car, let him believe he killed the right woman, and use the ploy reveal his duplicitous hand to the law. Instead, she's knocked unconscious in the attempt, Collins and his gunman think she's dead, throw her in the car, and speed away frightened. She comes to and spills the beans on her plan. Stumped, they take her to the brokerage's skyscraper office, where she first threatens to jump (to bring in the authorities), then they counter-threaten to push her off (to silence her). Stalling for time, she holds the gangsters at bay hoping that help will arrive in time. Realizing it's been too long for their plan to have worked, Eddie notifies the police, who swarm the brokerage office and take the gangsters prisoner just in time.

All is forgotten, and everyone is nice to one-another, relieved no-one's been harmed.

== Cast ==
- Eddie Albert as Eddie Barnes
- Joan Leslie as Mary Matthews
- Jane Darwell as Grandma Allen
- Alan Hale, Sr. as Rodney Barnes
- William T. Orr as George Formsby
- John Litel as Tim Gordon
- Anthony Quinn as Chic Collins
- Edward Brophy as Rork
- Minna Gombell as Ella Barnes
- Vaughan Glaser as Charles Matthews
- Nana Bryant as Martha Matthews
- Edward Gargan as Kane
- Hobart Cavanaugh as David Tipton
- Frank Faylen as Pick
- William B. Davidson as Harry Eckles
- Etta McDaniel as Blossom

== Bibliography ==
- Fetrow, Alan G. Feature Films, 1940–1949: a United States Filmography. McFarland, 1994.
