= The Lifeline =

1946 novel

- First edition
- Author: Phyllis Bottome
- Language: English
- Genre: Thriller
- Publisher: Faber and Faber
- Publication date: 1946
- Publication place: United Kingdom
- Media type: Print

The Lifeline (sometimes written as The Life-Line) is a 1946 thriller novel by the British writer Phyllis Bottome. It has been suggested as a direct influence on Ian Fleming, who had once attended a school run by Bottome, and his later creation of the James Bond stories. Equally the protagonist Mark Chalmers may have been partly based on Fleming himself. It was the only spy novel written by Bottome.

== Synopsis ==
An Eton schoolmaster heading off on his annual visit to the Austrian Alps, which has recently been annexed by Germany agrees to a casual request from a Foreign Office friend to carry a message to the country. Before long he finds himself embroiled in the anti-Nazi resistance and targeted by the Gestapo.

== Bibliography ==
- Buckton, Oliver. The World Is Not Enough: A Biography of Ian Fleming. Rowman & Littlefield, 2021.
- Lassner, Phyllis. British Women Writers of World War II: Battlegrounds of their Own. Springer, 1998.
