= Danger Signal (novel) =

1939 novel

- First edition (UK)
- Author: Phyllis Bottome
- Original title: Murder in the Bud
- Language: English
- Genre: Drama
- Publisher: Faber and Faber (UK); Little, Brown (US)
- Publication date: 1939
- Publication place: United Kingdom
- Media type: Print

Danger Signal is a 1939 thriller novel by the British writer Phyllis Bottome. Typist Hilda Fenchurch broods over her failed love affair with medical student Ronnie Mason, and is disturbed when she discovers that he has now turning his attention towards her younger sister. Fearful of the exposure of her own affair, she resolves to murder him. It was originally published under the alternative title of Murder in the Bud.

== Film adaptation ==
In 1945 it was adapted into the American film Danger Signal directed by Robert Florey and starring Faye Emerson and Zachary Scott. The script had problems with the Hays Code, with objections to several elements in the original novel. The film version shifted the setting from England to Los Angeles.

== Bibliography ==
- Goble, Alan. The Complete Index to Literary Sources in Film. Walter de Gruyter, 1999.
- Taves, Brian. Robert Florey, the French Expressionist. 1987.
