= The Man Who Cheated Himself =

1950 film by Felix E. Feist

- Theatrical release poster
- Directed by: Felix E. Feist
- Screenplay by: Seton I. Miller; Philip MacDonald
- Story by: Seton I. Miller
- Produced by: Jack M. Warner
- Starring: Lee J. Cobb; Jane Wyatt; John Dall
- Cinematography: Russell Harlan
- Edited by: David Weisbart
- Music by: Louis Forbes
- Color process: Black and white
- Production company: Jack M. Warner Productions
- Distributed by: 20th Century Fox
- Release dates: December 29, 1950 (Philadelphia); January 9, 1951 (Los Angeles); February 8, 1951 (New York)
- Running time: 81 minutes
- Country: United States
- Language: English
- Budget: $500,000

The Man Who Cheated Himself is a 1950 American crime film noir directed by Felix E. Feist and starring Lee J. Cobb, Jane Wyatt and John Dall.

== Plot ==
Wealthy socialite Lois Frazer, divorcing her fortune-hunter husband Howard, finds a gun that he had bought. She kills him with it in front of the new man in her life, Lt. Ed Cullen, a homicide detective with the San Francisco police. Cullen takes control, discarding the weapon and moving the body. Cullen is assigned to investigate the case, assisted by his younger brother Andy, who is new to the homicide division and delays his honeymoon to keep working on his first big case.

The gun is found and used in another killing by a young punk named Nito Capa. Cullen, with few options to save himself and Lois, tries to pin both crimes on Capa. However, Andy continues to connect Ed to the first murder, catching him in several evasions and lies. In desperation, Ed knocks Andy unconscious, ties and gags him and calls Lois and tells her they need to flee. Police roadblocks seal the city, but Andy has a hunch about where Ed has taken Lois to hide at the abandoned ruins of Fort Point under the Golden Gate Bridge, where Andy and his brother played as children. Their escape plan almost works, but they are arrested.

Outside the courtroom, Ed sees Lois affectionately offering to do anything for her lawyer if he can prevent her conviction. Defeated, Ed offers her a cigarette and they share a final goodbye gaze.

== Cast ==
- Lee J. Cobb as Lt. Ed Cullen
- Jane Wyatt as Lois Frazer
- John Dall as Andy Cullen
- Lisa Howard as Janet Cullen
- Harlan Warde as Howard Frazer
- Tito Vuolo as Pietro Capa
- Charles Arnt as Ernest Quimby (as Charles E. Arnt)
- Marjorie Bennett as Muriel Quimby
- Alan Wells as Nito Capa

== Production ==
The film was initially known as The Gun. It was the first independent production by Jack M. Warner and started filming on location in San Francisco on May 15, 1950, and at General Service Studios. It was initially set to be distributed by United Artists, but by June, the distributor had been changed to Twentieth Century-Fox. In August 1950, the film was retitled The Man Who Cheated Himself.

== Release ==
The Man Who Cheated Himself was first screened in Philadelphia on December 29, 1950, and opened in more cities on New Year's Day.

== Reception ==
In a contemporary review for The New York Times, critic A. H. Weiler wrote: "Credit 'The Man Who Cheated Himself' with being explicit. For the melodrama ... does not resort to common film-flam, excessive fireworks or hide a fact from the moment its title is flashed on the screen to its climax. What it sets out to prove—the titular thesis that its leading man is a gent doomed to defeat—it does conclusively. But, since it is perfectly lucid, the picture, in the main, is robbed of suspense, leaving little else but a workmanlike story depicted fairly professionally if not with great verve or speed. ... Call 'The Man Who Cheated Himself' interesting but not exciting fare."

Critic Philip K. Scheuer of the Los Angeles Times wrote: "Cobb appears reasonably harassed as the cop divided between an unholy passion for the woman and his affection for his kid brother—not to mention his guilty sense of dereliction to duty—but he falls to give us the 'why' of the character. This is probably because the screen play (by Phillp MacDonald and Seton I. Miller) chooses to present the character objectively, neither condemning nor condoning. Miss Wyatt seems miscast as the cheating wife, though of course one never can tell."

In The Philadelphia Inquirer, reviewer Mildred Martin wrote: "Despite its awkward title, 'The Man Who Cheated Himself' is generally stralghforward ,,, Whether you find it convincing or not depends to a large extent upon your ability to accept Cobb as a romantic type so bedazzled by a murderous minx he would be willing to risk hls career to save her nasty little neck."

== See also ==
- List of films in the public domain in the United States
