= Joy Page =

American actress (1924–2008)

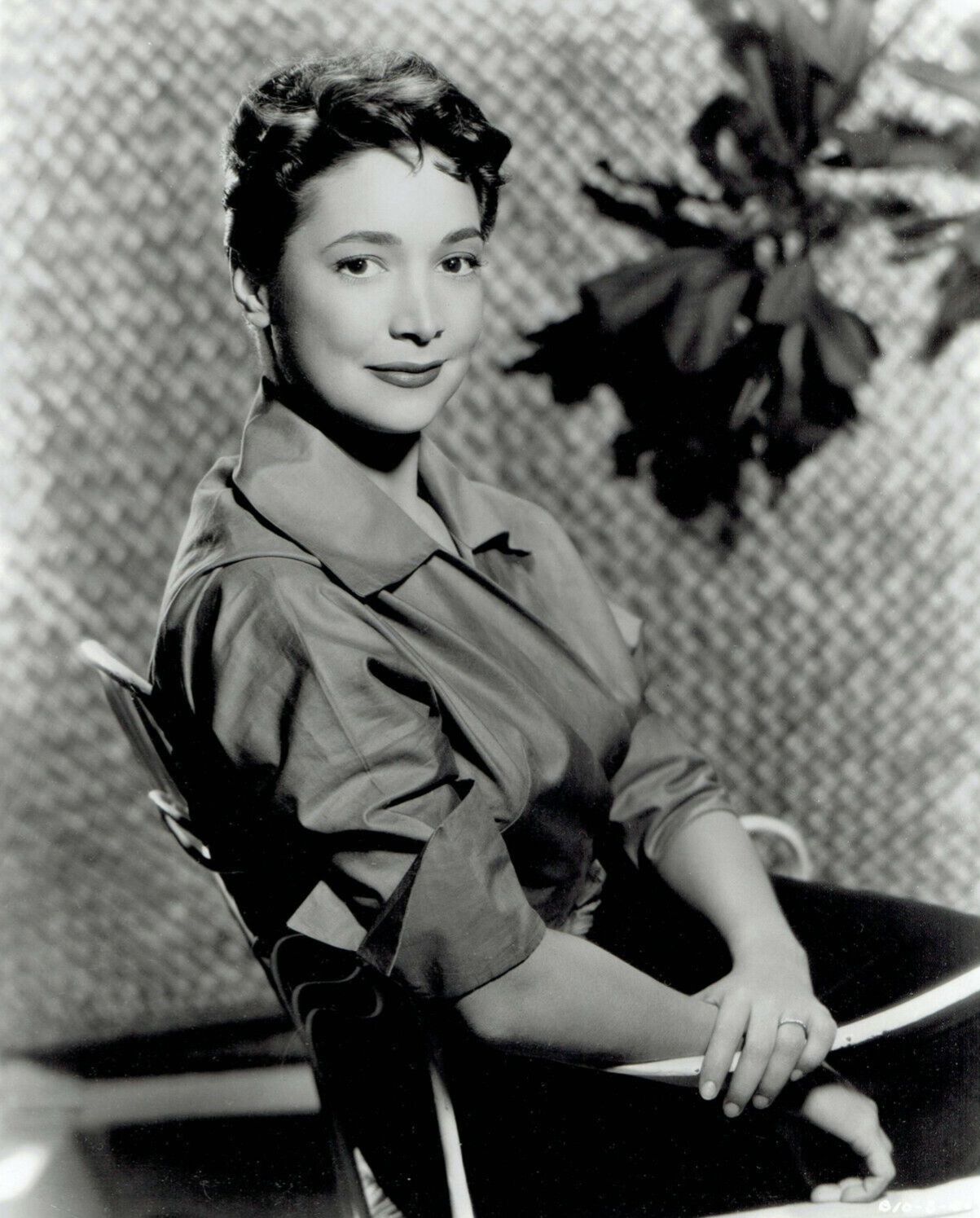
- Page in 1956
- Born: Joy Cerrette Paige; November 9, 1924
- Died: April 18, 2008 (aged 83)
- Other name: Joanne Page
- Occupation: Actress
- Years active: 1942–1959
- Spouse: William T. Orr (m. 1945; div. 1970)
- Children: 2, including Gregory Orr
- Parents: Don Alvarado (father); Ann Warner (mother)
- Relatives: Jack L. Warner (stepfather); Jack M. Warner (stepbrother)

Joy Page (born Joy Cerrette Paige; November 9, 1924 – April 18, 2008) was an American actress. She is best known for her role as the Bulgarian refugee Annina Brandel in Casablanca (1942). She was sometimes credited as Joanne Page.

== Early life ==
Page was the daughter of Mexican-American silent film star Don Alvarado (born José Ray Paige, in New Mexico) and Ann Warner, the daughter of Russian Jewish immigrants. Her parents divorced when she was eight.

In 1936, her mother married Jack L. Warner, then head of Warner Bros. studios.

== Career ==
Page landed the part of Bulgarian refugee Annina Brandel in Casablanca without any help from her stepfather, as he did not want a family member taking up acting. Page herself only tried out for the role at the suggestion of her acting coach, viewing the part as "corny and old-fashioned", according to her son; she only changed her mind when she learned that Bergman had been cast. She was only seventeen and fresh out of high school. Page, along with Dooley Wilson and Humphrey Bogart, were the only American-born feature actors in the film.

Warner refused to sign Page to a contract, and she never appeared in another Warner Bros. film. She went on to act in a number of films for other studios, including a featured role in her next film, Kismet in 1944. She was usually billed as Joanne Page, and also made some television appearances. In 1945, Page married actor William T. Orr. He became a Warner Bros. executive, leading to accusations of nepotism. She retired from acting after appearing in the first season of Disney's miniseries The Swamp Fox in 1959. The year before, in her final film role, she played Prairie Flower, a Sioux Indian and mother of White Bull, played by Sal Mineo, in Tonka.. She also appeared in an episode of Wagon Train as the wife of Bill Tawnee ("The Bill Tawnee Story").

== Personal life ==
Page married actor William T. Orr in 1945. She died on April 18, 2008, of complications arising from a stroke and pneumonia.

== Filmography ==
Year	Title	Role
1942	Casablanca	Annina Brandel
1944	Kismet	Marsinah
1948	Man-Eater of Kumaon	Lali
1950	Bullfighter and the Lady	Anita de la Vega
1953	Conquest of Cochise	Consuelo de Cordova
1953	Fighter Attack	Nina
1955	The Shrike	Charlotte Moore
1958	Tonka	Prairie Flower
