= Kismet (1944 film) =

1944 Metro-Goldwyn-Mayer film directed by William Dieterle

- Directed by: William Dieterle
- Screenplay by: John Meehan
- Based on: Kismet; 1911 play by Edward Knoblock
- Produced by: Everett Riskin
- Starring: Ronald Colman; Marlene Dietrich; James Craig; Edward Arnold
- Cinematography: Charles Rosher
- Edited by: Ben Lewis
- Music by: Score: Herbert Stothart; Songs: Harold Arlen (music); Yip Harburg (lyrics)
- Color process: Technicolor
- Production company: Metro-Goldwyn-Mayer
- Distributed by: Loew's, Inc
- Release date: August 22, 1944
- Running time: 100 minutes
- Country: United States
- Language: English

Kismet is a 1944 American Metro-Goldwyn-Mayer fantasy-drama film in Technicolor starring Ronald Colman, Marlene Dietrich, Joy Page, and Florence Bates. James Craig played the young Caliph of Baghdad, and Edward Arnold was the treacherous Grand Vizier. It was directed by William Dieterle, but was not a success at the box office. Dieterle had directed Dietrich two decades before in the German silent film Man by the Wayside, which was both the first role in which Dietrich was cast competitively and Dieterle's directorial debut.

The film is based on the play of the same name by Edward Knoblock, which was also the basis for a 1953 musical. The play had been filmed three times before, in 1914, 1920, and again in 1930 by Warner Brothers in an English version directed by John Francis Dillon and in a German-language version directed by William Dieterle that was released in 1931.

== Plot ==
The story takes place "when old Baghdad was new and shiny", in an Arabian Nights atmosphere. Colman plays Hafiz, a middle-aged beggar and magician who parades about as the King of Beggars during the day, and as the Prince of Hassir during the night. As the Prince of Hassir he meets Lady Jamilla, the Queen of the Grand Vizier's harem, who knows he is a poser but is fascinated by him.

Meanwhile, the young Caliph disguises himself as the "son of the Royal Gardener", and roams the streets of Baghdad to learn about his subjects firsthand, despite the disapproval of his trusted adviser Agha. During his sojourns, he meets and falls in love with Marsinah, Hafiz's daughter. Unknowingly on another sojourn, he meets the "Prince of Hassir" and is amused by his magic tricks, specifically the one where Hafiz draws a knife from handkerchiefs.

Determined to make a "world of dreams" for his daughter Marsinah, Hafiz has built high walls around his house, so as to raise her up on fairy tales and the promise she will marry royalty. Marsinah's nurse, Karsha, growls "Bah!" every time Hafiz gets expansive about the future. She knows that Marsinah has fallen in love with a "gardener's son", but keeps it from Hafiz. Marsinah tells her suitor about Hafiz's promise of a "prince who will batter the walls down". The Caliph returns to his palace, planning to propose marriage to Marsinah.

The next day, Hafiz witnesses an attempt on the Caliph's life by an agent of the Grand Vizier. The Vizier kills the would-be assassin before he can be caught and questioned, as the Caliph suggested, and ever more so, the Caliph suspects him of being behind the plot.

Although he knows the Caliph is unmarried, Hafiz decides the Vizier is good enough for his daughter, for he might be Caliph himself soon. Stealing fancy clothes from the market, Hafiz talks his way into the Vizier's presence as the Prince of Hassir and offers him Marsinah's hand in marriage. The Vizier plies Hafiz with wine and food and shows off his dancing girls. A reluctant Jamilla only agrees to perform when she realizes the guest is her false Prince of Hassir. In a private moment, Hafiz asks Jamilla to leave the Vizier and marry him, and she agrees. Marsinah will take her place as Queen of the Harem and be the wife of the Grand Vizier. Returning home, Hafiz tells his daughter to prepare for her wedding day; Marsinah is despondent of this, and then resigns herself to her kismet.

Then Hafiz is arrested for theft of those fancy clothes and is brought before the amused Vizier. He is sentenced to have his hands cut off, but before the sentence can be carried out, a messenger ominously summons the Vizier to appear before the Caliph. To ensure his obedience, the Vizier's palace is surrounded by the Caliph's soldiers. Hafiz bargains with the Vizier for his hands and life, and for his daughter to become the new Queen of the Harem and the wife of the Grand Vizier. This bargain is to be sealed, with Hafiz offering to kill the Caliph by using his magic and shows the Grand Vizier his trick of drawing a knife from handkerchiefs and throws it, expertly, to its mark.

Hafiz, with help of the Grand Vizier's office, arranges to meet with the Caliph at a public open air audience. The plan is suspected when the Caliph's officers tell him about the source of the petition. This is further complicated when they notify him at the last moment n that Hafiz is the man he has been searching for to ask for Marsinah's hand in marriage. Hafiz, unaware that the Caliph is the man to whom he showed his knife trick and whom his daughter is in love with, wangles his way closer to the Caliph so that he can do the trick and assassinate the Caliph. Knowing what to expect, the Caliph leans out of the way of the thrown knife. In the confusion, the Vizier escapes and orders that Marsinah be killed. Hafiz, realzing what his failure means, rushes to Marsinah to save her. In the harem, Hafiz and the Vizier fight it out. After Hafiz kills the Vizier, the palace guards arrive and arrest Hafiz.

As punishment, the Caliph makes Hafiz a Prince of the desolate and barren region of Hassir and orders him out of Baghdad by sunset. Prince Hassir agrees and asks that the Caliph, when he seeks his daughter to become his wife, tear down the walls of Hafiz's home, fulfilling the dreams that he told his daughter about.

The Caliph orders his men to tear down the walls and arrives on his white horse. Marsinah is told that the man she recognizes as the gardener's son is really the Caliph, and the lovers are united. Though Hafiz, now the Prince of Hassir, is exiled from Baghdad for life, he sees that his beloved daughter will be wedded to the Caliph and, with Jamilla by his side, they leave Baghdad for Hassir together, thus fulfilling his kismet too.

== Cast ==
- Ronald Colman - Hafiz
- Marlene Dietrich - Jamilla
- James Craig - Caliph
- Edward Arnold - The Grand Vizier
- Hugh Herbert - Feisal
- Joy Page - Marsinah (as Joy Ann Page)
- Florence Bates - Karsha
- Harry Davenport - Agha
- Hobart Cavanaugh - Moolah
- Robert Warwick - Alfife
- Frank Morgan - Narrator (uncredited)
- Barry Macollum - Amu (uncredited)

== Awards ==
The film was nominated for four Academy Awards: Best Cinematography, Best Music, Best Sound (Douglas Shearer) and Best Art Direction (Cedric Gibbons, Daniel B. Cathcart, Edwin B. Willis, Richard Pefferle).

== See also ==
- List of American films of 1944
