= Jean Anderson =

English actress (1907–2001)

- Born: Mary Jean Heriot Anderson; 12 December 1907; Eastbourne, Sussex, England
- Died: 1 April 2001 (aged 93); Edenhall, Cumbria, England
- Occupation: Actress
- Years active: 1947–2000
- Spouse: Peter Powell (m. 1934; div. 1949)

Mary Jean Heriot Powell (12 December 1907 – 1 April 2001), better known by her stage name Jean Anderson, was an English actress best remembered for her television roles as formidable matriarch Mary Hammond in the BBC drama The Brothers (1972–1976) and as rebellious aristocrat Lady Jocelyn "Joss" Holbrook in the Second World War series Tenko (1982–1985). She also had a distinguished career on stage and appeared in 46 films.

== Early life and stage ==
Anderson was born on 12 December 1907 in Eastbourne, Sussex to Scottish parents, and grew up in Guildford, Surrey. She trained at the Royal Academy of Dramatic Art from 1926–1928. Her first professional engagement was in Many Waters at the Prince's Theatre, Bristol, in 1929 with her fellow RADA student Robert Morley.

In 1934 she joined the Cambridge Festival Theatre, appearing in The Circle by Somerset Maugham and Yahoo by Lord Longford. In 1935 she played Lady Macbeth with The Seagull Players in Leeds.

In 1936 Lord Longford's company from the Gate Theatre, Dublin were appearing at the Westminster Theatre in London. Anderson joined them to appear in Ah, Wilderness! and stayed on for the rest of their season, including Carmilla, The Moon in the Yellow River, Youth’s the Season . . . ? and Yahoo. When the company returned to Dublin she went with them and appeared regularly at the Gate Theatre for three years. Among many notable productions were As You Like It, The Duchess of Malfi, The Cherry Orchard and Doctor Faustus.

John Cowell wrote:

Jean Anderson, with her fascinating voice and medieval good looks, became a tower of strength in Longford Productions... As Longford’s first leading lady, she brought a new and fresh charm to every role. Her Rosalind in As You Like It caught the scent of the musk-rose in the hidden places of the Forest of Arden.

When Anderson returned to London in 1940 she joined the staff of the Players’ Theatre Club, which was a popular refuge from the war. When the director Leonard Sachs was called up for service, Anderson took over running the club and kept it going for the duration.

Her acting career resumed after the war with 1066 and All That, Don Juan in Hell, The Apple Cart and The Moon in the Yellow River with Jack Hawkins. At this point the focus of her work swung to television and film, but she continued to appear on stage in notable productions, such as Pirandello’s Six Characters in Search of an Author directed by Dame Ngaio Marsh, Hedda Gabler, an all-star Uncle Vanya at Hampstead Theatre, and Les Liaisons Dangereuses with Alan Rickman and the Royal Shakespeare Company in London and also on Broadway. Her last stage work was in Terence Rattigan’s Harlequinade in 1988.

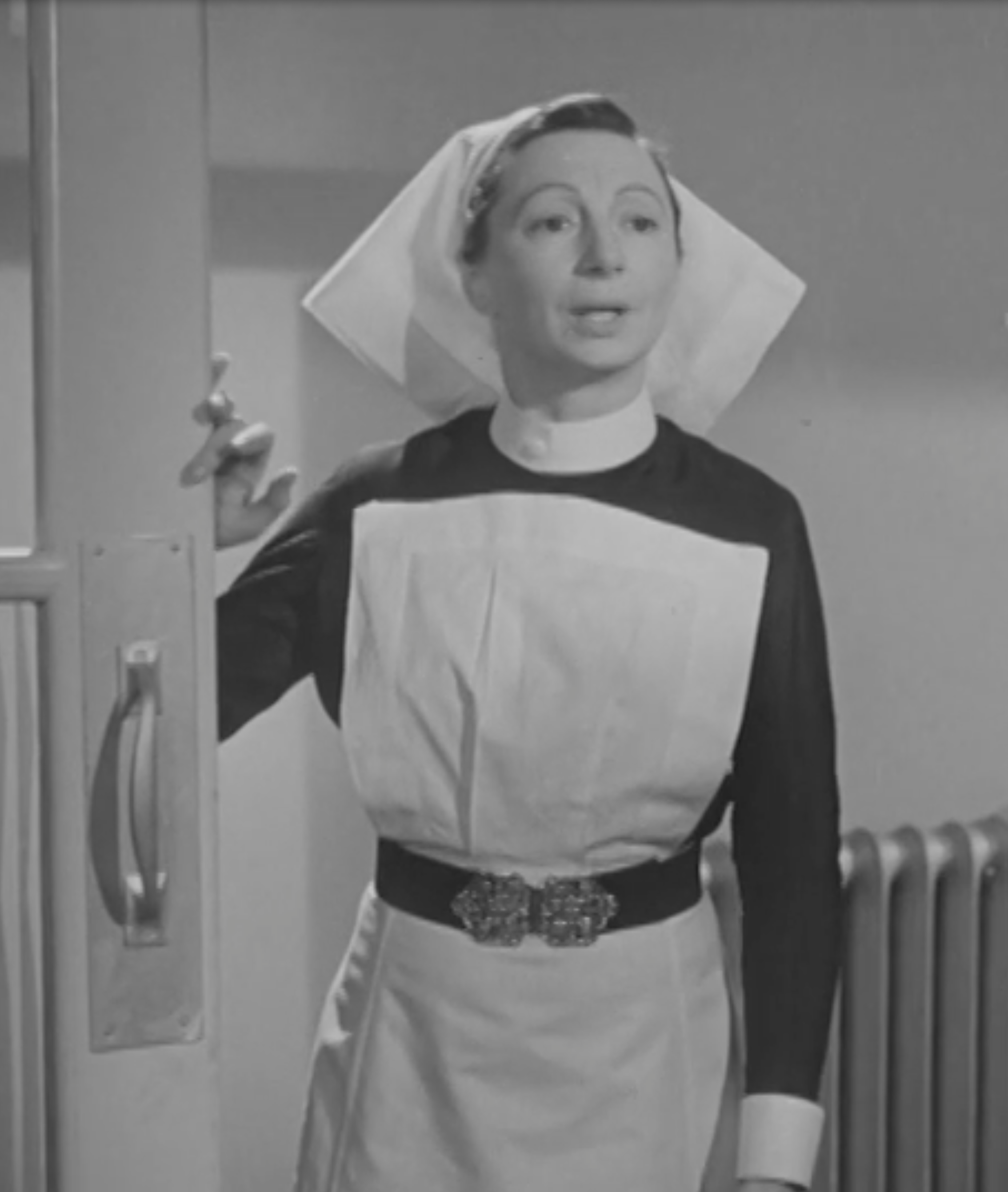
As Night Sister in Life in Her Hands (1951)

== Television ==
Her first appearance on television was in Weep for the Cyclops on BBC in 1947.

Other TV credits include: Police Surgeon, Maigret, The Odd Man, The Man in Room 17, The Borderers, Paul Temple, Codename, Oil Strike North, Miss Marple, Inspector Morse, Campion, Rab C. Nesbitt, Keeping Up Appearances and Hetty Wainthropp Investigates. She also played the role of the mother in The Railway Children in two separate BBC adaptations in 1951 and 1957.

She reprised her role in the play The Moon in the Yellow River BBC 1953. Her last television work was in Keeping Mum in 1998 on BBC.

== Filmography ==
=== Films ===
- The Mark of Cain (1947) – Extra (uncredited)
- Bond Street (1948) – Dress Shop Assistant (uncredited)
- Elizabeth of Ladymead (1948)
- The Romantic Age (1949) – Miss Sankey (uncredited)
- Seven Days to Noon (1950) – Mother at Railway Station (uncredited)
- Out of True (1951) – Dr. Bell
- The Franchise Affair (1951) – Miss Tuff
- Life in Her Hands (1951) – Night Sister
- White Corridors (1951) – Sister Gater
- High Treason (1951) – Woman in Street (uncredited)
- The Brave Don't Cry (1952) – Mrs. Sloan
- Time Bomb (1953) – Matron (uncredited)
- Street Corner (1953) – Miss Haversham – Store Detective
- Johnny on the Run (1953) – Mrs. MacIntyre
- The Kidnappers (1953) – Grandma MacKenzie
- The Pleasure Garden (1953) – Aunt Minerva
- The Weak and the Wicked (1954) – Policewoman in Court (uncredited)
- Lease of Life (1954) – Miss Calthorp
- Laughing in the Sunshine (1956) – Diana Masefield
- The Secret Tent (1956) – Mrs. Martyn
- A Town Like Alice (1956) – Miss Horsefall
- The Barretts of Wimpole Street (1957) – Wilson
- Lucky Jim (1957) – Mrs. Welch
- Robbery Under Arms (1957) – Ma Marston
- Heart of a Child (1958) – Maria
- A Night to Remember (1958) – Stuffy Lady in Lifeboat (uncredited)
- SOS Pacific (1959) – Miss Shaw
- Solomon and Sheba (1959) – Takyan
- Spare the Rod (1961) – Mrs. Pond
- Little Girls Never Cry (1962) – Aunt Kate
- Waltz of the Toreadors (1962) – Agnes
- The Inspector (1962) – Mrs. Jongman
- The Three Lives of Thomasina (1963) – Mrs. MacKenzie
- The Silent Playground (1963) – Mrs. Lacey
- Half a Sixpence (1967) – Lady Botting
- Country Dance (1970) – Matron
- The Night Digger (1971) – Mrs. Millicent McMurtrey
- Dear Parents (1973)
- The Lady Vanishes (1979) – Baroness
- Screamtime (1983) – Mildred
- Madame Sousatzka (1988) – Lady with Removal Men
- Leon the Pig Farmer (1992) – Mrs. Samuels
- Simon Magus (1999) – Roise
- The Harpist (1999) – Mrs. Merz
- Endgame (2000) – Nell

Her last role was in Conor McPherson’s film of Samuel Beckett’s Endgame, shot in Dublin just a few months before her death.

=== Television ===
- Weep for the Cyclops (1947) – Rebecca Dingley
- The Governess (1948) – Kate
- Charles and Kate (1949) – Mrs. Bracebridge
- The Railway Children (1951) – Mother (12 episodes)
- The Fifty Mark (1951) – Aunt Stella
- A Tomb with a View (1951) – Miss Heron
- BBC Sunday Night Theatre (1952–59) – Various (8 episodes)
- Joey's Burglar (1953) – Mrs. Spencer
- Shadow and Substance (1953) – Miss Jemima Cooney
- Dear Randolph (1953) – Hilda Randolph
- Douglas Faibanks Presents (1954–56) – Various (2 episodes)
- The Messenger (1955) – Elizabeth
- Remember Jane (1955) – Miss Temple
- ITV Play of the Week (1956–62) – Various (5 episodes)
- The Railway Children (1957) – Mother (8 episodes)
- The Survivors (1957) – Jane Decker
- The Kentish Robin (1957) – Queen Elizabeth I
- Dona Clariñes (1957) – Dona Clariñes
- African Patrol (1958) – Linda Newton (1 episode)
- Uncertain Mercy (1958) – Miss Watson
- Boyd Q.C. (1959) – TBC (1 episode)
- No Hiding Place (1959) – Mrs. Evesham (1 episode)
- Interpol Calling (1959) – Nun (1 episode)
- Saturday Playhouse (1959–60) – Various (2 episodes)
- The Vise (1959) – Marion (1 episode)
- A Chance to Live (1960) – Winnie Thorpe
- Armchair Mystery Theatre (1960) – Meg
- BBC Sunday Night Play (1960-2) – Various (2 episodes)
- The Knight Errant Limited (1960) – Mrs. Smith (1 episode)
- Someone to Talk To (1960) – Jessie Truscott
- Police Surgeon (1960) – Miss Pears (2 episodes)
- Armchair Theatre (1961–71) – Various (3 episodes)
- Maigret (1960) – Madame Gallet (1 episode)
- Somerset Maughan Hour (1961) – Mrs. Hannay (1 episode)
- Doctor Knock (1961) – Madama Pons (1 episode)
- Ghost Squad (1961) – Tante Marie (1 episode)
- Suspense (1962) – Miss Reid (1 episode)
- Wuthering Heights (1962) – Ellen
- The Odd Man (1963) – Miss Twilight (1 episode)
- Moonstrike (1963) – Madame (1 episode)
- The Third Man (1963) – Lady Fiona (1 episode)
- Lorna Doone (1963) – Miss Ridd (11 episodes)
- Smuggler's Bay (1964) – Aunt Jane (2 episodes)
- Thursday Theatre (1964) – Monica Pleydon MP (1 episode)
- Dr. Finlay's Casebook (1964–67) – Various (4 episodes)
- The Wednesday Play (1964) – Miss Grant (1 episode)
- The Sullavan Brothers (1964) – Mrs. Lamorbey (1 episode)
- Alexander Graham Bell (1965) – Jeannie MacEwan (3 episodes)
- Jury Room (1965) – Miss Jenkins (1 episode)
- Buddenbrooks (1965) – Frau Consul (6 episodes)
- Jackanory (1966) – Storyteller (6 episodes)
- The Heart of Midlothian (1966) – Meg Merdockson
- This Man Craig (1966) – Miss Dougall (2 episodes)
- Sir Arthur Conan Doyle (1967) – Ada Grey (1 episode)
- Look and Read (1967) – Miss Brown (6 episodes)
- St. Ives (1967) – Miss Gilchrist (4 episodes)
- Late Night Horror (1968) – Mrs. Revdale (1 episode)
- BBC Play of the Month (1968) – Miss Ramsden (1 episode)
- The Tenant of Wildfell Hall (1968) – Mrs. Maxwell (2 episodes)
- Run a Crooked Mile (1969) – Sister Teresa
- The Borderers (1970) – Lady Grizel (1 episode)
- Wicked Women (1970) – Mrs. Wallace (1 episode)
- Kate (1970) – Pamela Stanton (1 episode)
- Paul Temple (1970) – Marthe (1 episode)
- Codename (1970) – Penelope Blanchard (1 episode)
- Bachelor Father (1970) – Mrs. Jenkins (1 episode)
- Little Women (1970) – Aunt March (7 episodes)
- Fathers and Sons (1971) – Princess Natasha (2 episodes)
- Alberte (1972) – Mrs. Digby (1 episode)
- The Adventures of Black Beauty (1972) – The Hon. Mrs. Jameson (1 episode)
- Scoop (1972) – Great Aunt Anne (2 episodes)
- The Brothers (1972–76) – Mary Hammond (92 episodes)
- Late Call (1975) – Voice #1 (1 episode)
- Oil Strike North (1975) – Mrs. Douglas (1 episode)
- The ITV Play (1980) – Charlotte Ardsley (1 episode)
- Love Story: A Chance to Sit Down (1981) – Dolly (3 episodes)
- Q.E.D. (1982) – Aunt Effie, Lady Euphimia Martin (1 episode)
- Tenko (1982–84) – Joceyln Holbrook (20 episodes)
- Tears Before Bedtime (1982) – Jean (1 episode)
- Summer Season (1985) – Mrs. Mcleod (1 episode)
- The Good Doctor Bodkin-Adams (1986) – Mrs. Langton-Jones
- Miss Marple (1987) – Mrs. Fane (1 episode)
- Campion (1989) – Belle Lafcadio (2 episodes)
- Back Home (1989) – Grandmother Dickinson
- Screen One (1990) – Molly Cowper (1 episode)
- Screen Two (1990-1) – Various (2 episodes)
- Casualty (1990-6) – Various (2 episodes)
- The Black Velvet Gown (1991) – Madame Gulmington
- Tonight at 8:30 (1991) – Aunt Martha (1 episode)
- G.B.H. (1991) – Dr. Goldup (3 episodes)
- The House of Elliot (1991) – Mrs. Spenser-Ewell (1 episode)
- Keeping Up Appearances (1991) – Mrs. Fortescue (1 episode)
- Trainer (1991) – Harriet May (1 episode)
- Heartbeat (1992) – Victoria Wainwright (1 episode)
- The Bogie Man (1992) – Mrs. Napier
- Inspector Morse (1993) – Lady Hinksey (1 episode)
- Diana: Her True Story (1993) – Lady Femoy
- Rab C. Nesbitt (1993) – Mrs. Monteith (1 episode)
- Moonacre (1994) – Mrs. Heliotrope (6 episodes)
- The Whipping Boy (1994) – Queen Mum
- Second Thoughts (1994) – Hermoine (1 episode)
- Mission Top Secret (1994) – Aunt Edith Cranberry (1 episode)
- Doctor Finlay (1995–96) – Mrs. Stirling (2 episodes)
- Family Money (1997) – Dolores (1 episode)
- Rebecca (1997) – Grandma (1 episode)
- The Uninvited (1997) – Elizabeth Madigan (1 episode)
- The Beggar Bride (1997) – Lady Alice Hurleston (2 episodes)
- Hetty Wainthropp Investigates (1998) – Alice Marsden (1 episode)
- Keeping Mum (1998) – Norma (1 episode)

== Personal life and death ==
In 1934 she married Peter Powell, who directed her in many plays over the years. They divorced in 1949. They had a daughter, Aude Powell, who became an agent, representing significant clients such as Rik Mayall and Billy Boyd.

She had a London home in Barnes, and in her later years moved to Eden Valley in the north-west of England near her daughter. Her interests were collecting porcelain figurines and horse racing.

She was the subject of This Is Your Life in 1985 when she was surprised by Eamonn Andrews.

Anderson died in 2001, aged 93.
