= The Mortal Storm =

1940 film by Frank Borzage

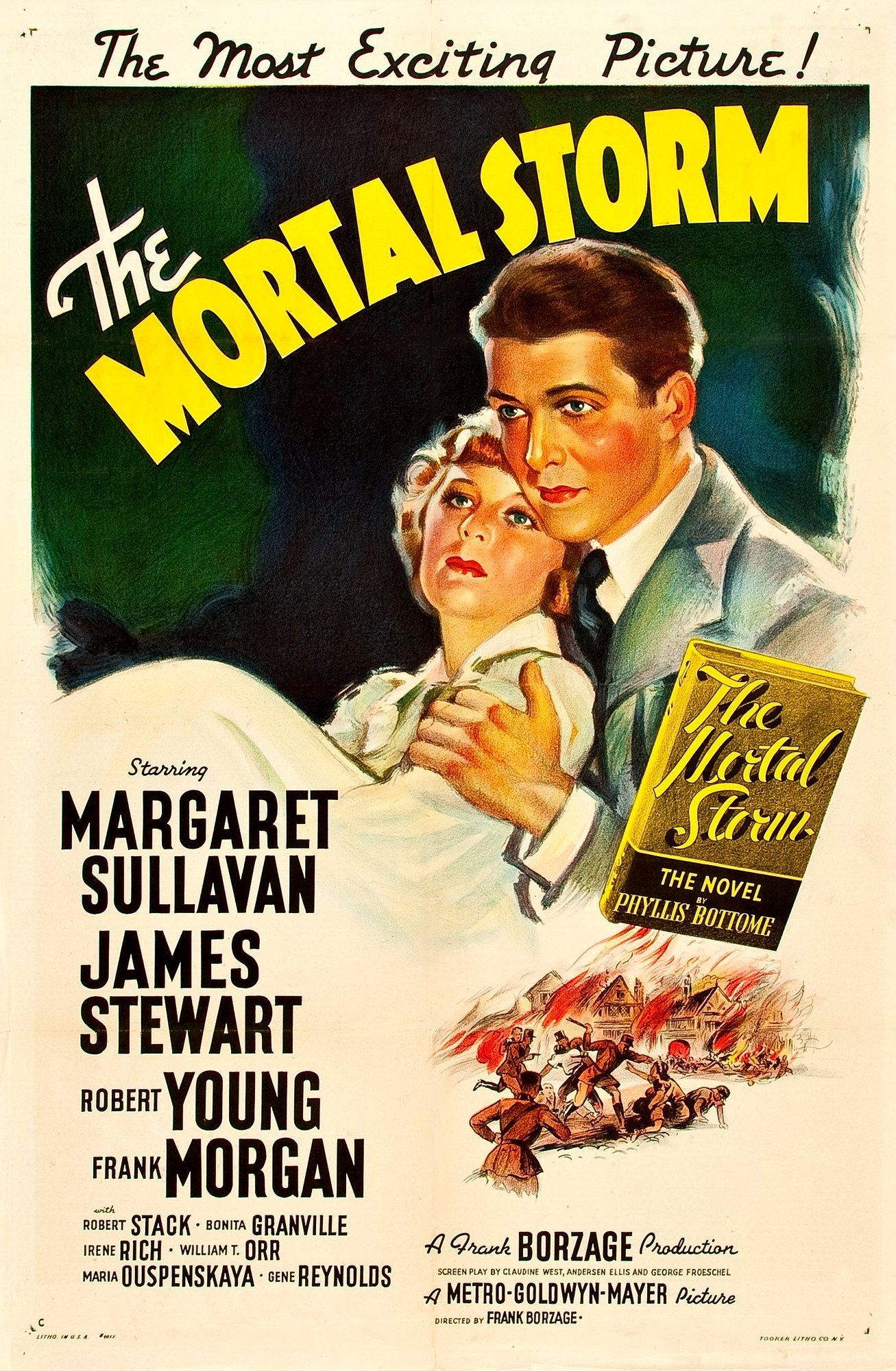
- Directed by: Frank Borzage
- Screenplay by: Claudine West; Hans Rameau; George Froeschel
- Based on: The Mortal Storm; 1937 novel by Phyllis Bottome
- Produced by: Frank Borzage; Victor Saville
- Starring: Margaret Sullavan; James Stewart; Robert Young; Frank Morgan; Robert Stack; Bonita Granville; Irene Rich; William T. Orr; Maria Ouspenskaya; Gene Reynolds
- Narrated by: Shepperd Strudwick
- Cinematography: William H. Daniels; Lloyd Knechtel; Leonard Smith
- Edited by: Elmo Veron
- Music by: Bronislau Kaper; Eugene Zador; Edward Kane
- Production company: Metro-Goldwyn-Mayer
- Distributed by: Loew's Inc.
- Release date: June 14, 1940
- Running time: 100 minutes
- Country: United States
- Language: English

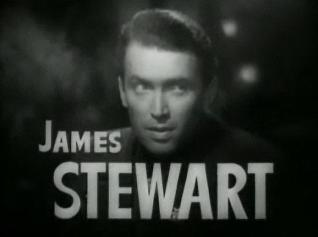
Frame from movie trailer

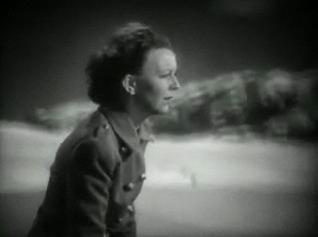
Margaret Sullavan in The Mortal Storm theatrical trailer

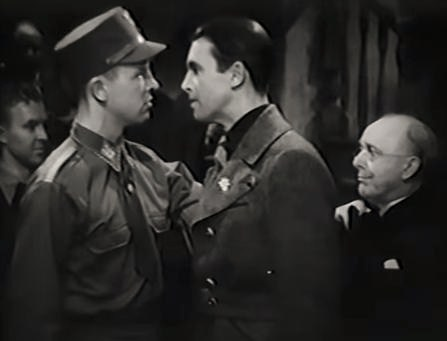
Dan Dailey and James Stewart in the trailer

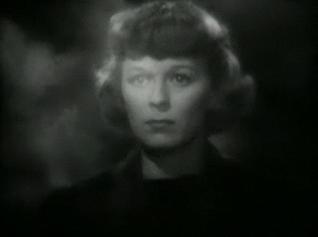
Margaret Sullavan in the trailer

Original theatrical trailer

The Mortal Storm is a 1940 American drama film produced by Metro-Goldwyn-Mayer. It was directed by Frank Borzage and stars Margaret Sullavan and James Stewart. The film shows the impact on Germans after Hitler becomes chancellor of Germany and gains unlimited power. The supporting cast features Robert Young, Robert Stack, Frank Morgan, Dan Dailey, Ward Bond and Maria Ouspenskaya.

The Mortal Storm was the first MGM production that dramatized the persecution of Jews under the Nazi regime in Germany during World War II, without explicitly using the word “Jew.”

== Plot ==
In the mountains of Germany near the Austrian border on January 30, 1933, Professor Viktor Roth, a distinguished "non-Aryan" professor who is adored by his students, celebrates his 60th birthday. His family consists of his wife Amelie, his daughter Freya, his young son Rudi and his adult stepsons Erich and Otto von Rohn. His class greets him with applause and a trophy presented by Martin Breitner and Fritz Marberg. The professor is proud of his family's "tolerance and sense of humor."

At a celebratory dinner, Fritz happily announces that he and Freya will be married, although Freya says that she hasn't agreed yet. Then the maid brings news: Adolf Hitler has become chancellor of Germany. Listening to the radio, Amelie worries about what will happen to free thinkers and non-Aryans. The ecstatic young men leave for a meeting, but Martin demurs.

Martin, Fritz, and Freya meet at an inn, where Professor Werner is bullied by a gang for not singing along with the "Horst Wessel Song." Martin interferes and the bullies allow Werner to leave. Fritz delivers Martin an ultimatum: join the party or be wiped out with other "pacifist vermin," but Martin refuses. Outside, the gang is beating Werner. On the train ride home, Fritz criticizes Freya for behavior unbecoming the daughter of a "non-Aryan."

Professor Roth refuses to teach the doctrine of racial purity, and his classes are boycotted. Students, who are now all in uniform, rally to burn banned books.

When Martin brings Freya home, the waiting gang assaults him. Mrs. Roth intervenes, admonishing her sons, who move out of their home to avoid being tainted by their relatives' un-Nazi attitudes. Weeks later, Freya comes to Martin's mountain farm. She wants him to meet their friends at the inn. He confesses his love to her. Professor Werner appears, begging for help because he is soon to be arrested. That night, Martin takes him on skis through a secret pass to Austria while the women successfully resist police attempts to intimidate them.

Professor Roth is arrested and Freya begs Fritz to learn where the professor has been taken. Fritz reluctantly arranges a brief meeting between Viktor and his wife at the concentration camp where he is imprisoned. Viktor urges her to leave the country with Freya and Rudi.

Otto comes home with news that the professor has died, supposedly from a heart attack, but Freya believes that he was killed.

At the border, Freya is detained for carrying her father's unpublished manuscript and is told that she will not be allowed to leave Germany. Returning home, she finds a note from Martin's mother, requesting that she comes to her farm. When she does, Freya finds Martin waiting to take her to Austria. Martin and Freya drink from the bride cup, with Hilda's blessing. Elsewhere, the Nazis beat Elsa until she reveals the pass. A Gestapo officer testing Fritz's loyalty makes him leader of the ski patrol. Fritz orders them to fire at Martin and Freya as they attempt to ski to safety. Freya is shot and dies in Martin's arms in Austria.

In the Roths' home, Fritz tells Erich and Otto of Freya's death and flees, crying, "It was my duty!" Erich is furious that Martin is free and storms out of the house. Before Otto leaves, he recalls in his mind some conversations that had taken place there—some, words by his father. Over celestial music, a man speaks: "I said to a man who stood at a gate, Give me a light that I may tread safely into the unknown. And he replied, Go out into the darkness and put your hand into the hand of God. That shall be to you better than a light, and safer than a known way."

== Cast ==
- Margaret Sullavan as Freya Roth
- James Stewart as Martin Breitner
- Robert Young as Fritz Marberg
- Frank Morgan as Prof. Viktor Roth
- Robert Stack as Otto von Rohn
- Bonita Granville as Elsa
- Irene Rich as Amelie Roth
- William T. Orr as Erich von Rohn
- Maria Ouspenskaya as Hilda Breitner
- Gene Reynolds as Rudi Roth
- Ward Bond as Franz
- Russell Hicks as Rector of University
- William Edmunds as Lehman, University Doorman
- Esther Dale as Marta, the Roths' Maid
- Dan Dailey as Hal or Holl, Youth Party Leader (billed as Dan Dailey, Jr.)
- Granville Bates as Professor Berg
- Thomas W. Ross as Professor Werner
- Lloyd Corrigan as Postman
- Howard Lang as Old Man On Train (uncredited)
- Henry Victor as Nazi who confiscates Manuscript (uncredited)
- Shepperd Strudwick as The Narrator (uncredited)

== Production ==
The film is based on the 1937 novel The Mortal Storm by the British writer Phyllis Bottome, who had moved to Austria in 1924 when her husband Alban Ernan Forbes Dennis was posted there. Dennis was a British diplomat and an MI6 station head with responsibility for Austria, Hungary and Yugoslavia. In 1930, she moved to Munich. She witnessed the rise of fascism, the rise to power of the Nazi party and the transformation of Nazi Germany.

The film's script diverged considerably from the story told in the book, but Bottome felt that the film retained the book's essence. However, Bottome wrote: "What it is to be a Nazi has been shown with unequivocal sincerity and life-likeness, but in the scene between the Jewish professor and his son, Rudi, there was a watering down of courage. Those familiar with the father’s definition of a good Jew will miss its full significance in the film because the central idea has been overlaid by insignificant words." The Mortal Storm was the only MGM movie to explicitly criticize the Nazi regime before America’s entry into World War II in December 1941. The film, however, made only oblique references to its antisemitic policies.

The Freya Roth character is the daughter of a Junker mother and a "non-Aryan" father. It is implied that Freya, her father and Rudi are Jews, but the word "Jew" is never actually used, and they are identified as "non-Aryans." However, in the scene where professor Roth is visited by his wife in the concentration camp, the sleeves of his shirt bear the large letter J (possibly to represent the yellow Star of David that Jews were forced by the Nazis to wear on their clothing). Metro-Goldwyn-Mayer movie mogul Louis B. Mayer, was aware that Warner Bros. studio pictures had been banned in Germany after their release of the anti-Hitler Confessions of a Nazi Spy (1939). Mayer was loath to lose the lucrative German market. As such, MGM films were presented to the Nazi German consul for approval, and objectionable scenes were modified before the film’s release in Germany.

Mountain snow scenes were filmed in Salt Lake City, Utah and Sun Valley, Idaho.

The score by award-winning composer Bronislau Kaper and by Eugene Zador was credited to the pseudonym of Edward Kane. MGM paid $250 for the rights to the "Horst Wessel Song" for use in the 1938 film Three Comrades. However, with the World War II underway in 1940, the German publisher demanded script approval in return for usage of the song. MGM ignored the request, and had Zador simply arrange the "Horst Wessel Lied" with English lyrics by Earl Brent. The English version of the song was titled "Close Up The Ranks".

The film concludes with an excerpt from the poem "The Gate of the Year," which King George VI made famous when he quoted it during his Christmas 1939 radio broadcast.

The Mortal Storm was the last of five films in which Margaret Sullavan and James Stewart appeared together. The others were Next Time We Love (1936), The Shopworn Angel (1938), Land of Liberty (1939) and The Shop Around the Corner (1940).

== Reception ==
Bosley Crowther of The New York Times calls The Mortal Storm "magnificently directed and acted ... a passionate drama, struck out of the deepest tragedy, which is comforting at this time only in its exposition of heroic stoicism." Howard Barnes' review in the New York Herald Tribune laments that Europe was at war by the time of the film's release: "Less than a year ago, it would have had far more dramatic and emotional impact than it has at this time. ... It is not MGM's fault, but the timing on the making of The Mortal Storm has been extremely bad."

A review in Variety states: "It is not the first of the anti-Nazi pictures, but it is the most effective film exposé to date of the totalitarian idea, a slugging indictment of the political and social theories advanced by Hitler. ... Performances are excellent." Harrison's Reports writes: "This is the most powerful anti-Nazi picture yet produced. It excels in every department—that of acting, direction, production and photography." Film Daily writes: "Because of its virulent exposition of Nazi methods, this film must be seen by every American ... Magnificently directed by Frank Borzage, pulsating with dramatic power, and played up to the hilt by a transcendingly skillful cast, it will electrify audiences wherever it is shown." John Mosher of The New Yorker praises the film's story for being presented "without any theatrical nonsense" and adds, "What is outstanding about Frank Borzage's direction is its restraint. The cruel story is told without any of the highlights of horror. We feel that what lies behind is worse than what we are shown."

The Mortal Storm ranks tenth on Film Daily's year-end nationwide poll of 546 critics naming the best films of 1940.

On the review aggregator website Rotten Tomatoes, 100% of 15 critics' reviews are positive.

== See also ==
- List of films with a 100% rating on Rotten Tomatoes, a film review aggregator website

== Sources ==
- Blauvelt, Christian. 2024. Hollywood Victory: The Movies, Stars, and Stories from World War II. Running Press, Philadelphia. ISBN 978-0-7624-9992-2
- Bogle, Charles. 2018. How the American establishment censored Hollywood during its “Golden Age.” World Socialist Web Site, May 17, 2018. How the American establishment censored Hollywood during its “Golden Age” Accessed 19 December 2023.
