= Jack M. Warner =

American film producer (1916–1995)

- Born: March 27, 1916
- Died: April 1, 1995 (aged 79); Los Angeles, California, U.S.
- Education: University of Southern California
- Occupation: Film producer
- Spouse: Barbara Richman (m. 1948; div. 1972)
- Children: 3
- Parents: Jack L. Warner; Irma Claire Salomon
- Relatives: Joy Page (step sister)

Jack Milton Warner (March 27, 1916 – April 1, 1995) was an American film producer and son of Hollywood movie mogul Jack L. Warner.

== Early life ==
Jack M. Warner was born on March 27, 1916, the only child of Irma C. (née Salomon) and Jack L. Warner. His father co-founded the film studio Warner Bros. Pictures with his brothers Harry Warner, Albert Warner, and Sam Warner. According to the federal census of 1930, Jack—then 14 years old—lived with his mother and father in "Beverly Hills City", California, along with five live-in servants, who performed the daily duties of butler, housekeeper, cook, "Ladies Maid", and chauffeur. His family was Jewish.

== Career ==
After graduating from the University of Southern California in 1938, Warner worked at Warner Bros.'s Burbank studio in the company's short-subject department. His experience in that position was later applied during his military service in World War II, when he helped to produce training films for the United States Army. Following the war he returned to Warner Bros., joined its distribution company, and later became a producer. Among the early films he produced were The Hasty Heart (1949), starring Richard Todd and Ronald Reagan, The Admiral Was a Lady, and The Man Who Cheated Himself (1950) starring Lee J. Cobb and Jane Wyatt. Warner had also been in charge of Sunset Productions, a television production and licensing subsidiary of Warner Bros. that later became "Warner Bros. TV Commercial and Industrial Films" and even later was merged into Warner Bros. Cartoons.

In 1958 Warner was dismissed from his position at Warner Bros. by his father. The two had become estranged after the elder Warner divorced his first wife Irma, Jack's mother, in 1935. Jack was never reconciled to his father's new wife Ann Page. The son learned only through announcements in the film industry's trade press that he had lost his job. He later wrote a novel Bijou Dream based loosely on his relationship with his father, who died in 1978.

Jack M. Warner in 1957 appeared as a contestant on You Bet Your Life, a televised quiz show hosted by Groucho Marx. Warner at the time served as president of the Mental Health Foundation of Los Angeles County, California; and he competed on the quiz show to win money, which he intended to contribute to the foundation. Although Warner did not win the "big money" on the show, he did win $250.

== Personal life and death ==
Warner married Connecticut native Barbara Richman in 1948. Together, they had three children. Warner died of cancer of the lymph nodes on April 1, 1995, at age 79 at Cedars-Sinai Medical Center in Los Angeles. His body was interred at Hillside Memorial Park in Culver City, California.
