= Sewing Circle (Hollywood) =

Sapphist Hollywood clique (1910–1969)

Sewing Circle (often styled the Hollywood sewing circle) is a euphemism used from the silent era through the mid-twentieth century for informal networks of lesbian and bisexual women, primarily actresses, writers, and filmmakers, in Hollywood. The term is discussed in film history and biography and has been used by curators framing scholarship on sapphic icons of early Hollywood.

== Etymology and usage ==
Film and theatre sources credit actress-producer Alla Nazimova with coining or popularizing "sewing circle" as discreet code for women who loved women in Hollywood's studio era; later accounts note the term's currency in circles around Marlene Dietrich. Sources emphasize it was not a formal club but a private, flexible network shaped by studio publicity, the Hays Code, and prevailing social mores.

Sewing Circle is also the phrase used (by Marlene Dietrich, for instance) to describe the group of lesbian and bisexual woman writers and actresses, such as Mercedes de Acosta and Tallulah Bankhead, and their relationships in celebrity circles, particularly during Hollywood's Golden Age from the 1910s to the 1950s. Unlike de Acosta and Bankhead, most members of the Sewing Circle were closeted. This usage of the term Sewing Circle was coined by the actress Alla Nazimova.

== Historiography and reception ==
Axel Madsen's monograph popularized the term in the 1990s, prompting mainstream coverage and debate about evidence standards for studio-era private lives; reviewers noted the book's reach and cautioned against sensationalism, urging careful corroboration. Institutional usage, such as the Academy Museum’s 2024 screening series The Sewing Circle: Sapphic Icons of Early Hollywood.

== Associated figures ==
- Alla Nazimova — Often credited with originating or popularizing the euphemism in Hollywood.
- Marlene Dietrich — Later usage and popularization are frequently associated with Dietrich's social milieu; scholarship and criticism discuss her connection to the subculture and to queer screen/persona politics.
- Ona Munson — Listed in a standard theatre reference as a member; that source attributes the term's origin to Nazimova.
- Eva Le Gallienne — Linked by reputable overviews to Nazimova and to the informal network described by the euphemism.
- Dorothy Arzner — Pioneering studio director frequently situated by scholars within queer Hollywood histories of the period.
- Ann Warner — Cited in a popular history as a close companion of Dietrich.
- Claudette Colbert — Claims of an affair with Dietrich circulate.

== See also ==
- Closeted
