= The Small World of Sammy Lee =

1963 British film by Ken Hughes

- Directed by: Ken Hughes
- Screenplay by: Ken Hughes
- Based on: story by Ken Hughes
- Produced by: Alec C. Snowden
- Starring: Anthony Newley; Julia Foster; Robert Stephens
- Cinematography: Wolfgang Suschitzky
- Edited by: Henry Richardson
- Music by: Kenny Graham
- Production company: Elgin Films
- Distributed by: British Lion Films (UK); Bryanston Films; Seven Arts Pictures
- Release date: 20 April 1963 (UK)
- Running time: 107 minutes
- Country: United Kingdom
- Language: English
- Budget: £190,067
- Box office: £49,981 (UK)

The Small World of Sammy Lee is a 1963 British black-and-white comedy-drama crime film written and directed by Ken Hughes and starring Anthony Newley, Julia Foster and Robert Stephens.

== Plot ==
Sammy Lee is the striptease compère at Peepshow Club in Soho. He has five hours to pay off a £300 gambling debt, and spends the day calling in all the favours he can think of from people he knows, trying all kinds of dodgy deals to raise cash. At the same time, he has to compere the afternoon and evening sessions at the strip club. Patsy, a girl he knows from Bradford, turns up, and does everything she can to help him, including doing a turn as a stripper.

When the deadline comes, Sammy has got some of the cash, but not enough. He realises he has lost. He tells the audience at the club some home truths about the strip joint, what the girls think of them, and what lowlives they are. He decides to flee by coach to Bradford with Patsy.

At Victoria Coach Station, he finds the bookie's two thugs waiting for him, and he leaves Patsy to take the coach alone. He faces his inevitable beating. When he regains consciousness he finds that one of his attackers has had a change of heart, and has left his wallet and cash beside him.

== Cast ==
- Anthony Newley as Sammy 'Lee' Leeman
- Julia Foster as Patsy
- Robert Stephens as Gerry Sullivan
- Wilfrid Brambell as Harry
- Warren Mitchell as Lou Leeman
- Miriam Karlin as Milly
- Kenneth J. Warren as Fred
- Clive Colin Bowler as Johnny
- Toni Palmer as Joan
- Cyril Shaps as Maurice 'Morrie' Bellman
- Roy Kinnear as Lucky Dave
- Harry Baird as Buddy Shine
- Harry Locke as stage manager
- Al Mulock as card dealer
- June Cunningham as Rita
- Derek Nimmo as Rembrandt
- Alfred Burke as Big Eddie
- Elmer as Lofty
- Lynda Baron as Yvette
- Ken Wayne as barman
- Kevin Brennan as poker player
- Billy Milton as hardware store manager
- Ronald Radd as Big Alf
- Coleridge Goode as Buddy Shine's bassist
- Louis Adams as Sydney
- Nora Gordon as Mrs. Harris
- Steve Plytas as Nick
- Harry Landis as Lucky Dave's clumsy bartender
- Rita Webb as cleaning woman #1
- Lucy Griffiths as cleaning woman #2
- Charlotte Naden as Woman walking down street

== Original TV Play ==
The film was based on the 1958 BBC TV one-character television play Sammy, also directed by Hughes and starring Newley, described by Variety as "a masterful piece of work."

The original TV play was adapted for American TV in 1958 as Eddie on Alcoa Theatre, starring Mickey Rooney and directed by Jack Smight. The production was censored at the last minute: during the final scene Rooney's character is beaten up, but the sponsors worried that this was too violent, so instead the screen went dark for twenty seconds. Variety called it "interesting, at times exciting." Both Rooney and Smight won Emmies for the show.

== Production ==
The original TV play was very successful and Hughes had requests to turn it into a feature film, but he was reluctant, considering that the one-person aspect of the story was crucial. In 1959 he was going to make the film for Warwick Productions but had not written the film.

Eventually he decided to adapt it, but he disliked the job he did. "I did everything wrong," he said. "I opened the story out in all the obvious ways. I showed what was happening at the other end of the telephone calls, for instance, when Sammy's end was all that was really needed." He then did another version, which he liked.

In June 1962 it was announced that Anthony Newley would star in the film version. Newley had just achieved a London stage success in Stop the World I Want to Get Off (1961) and later repeated this success on Broadway. The film was co-produced by Kenneth Hyman of Seven Arts. It was one of Seven Arts' first distribution efforts. Newley called it "the drama of the perennial loser."

The film was going to be produced by Kenneth Hyman but he became available so Frank Godwin did the job instead. Godwin said "The chemistry between Ken Hughes and I was great, and we worked together extremely well in the development of the script and the casting of numerous Soho characters, a background with which we were both familiar."

Julia Foster played the female lead. She has said that Ken Hughes was "scary ... and he frightened me slightly". She has also said that when she confronted him he told her that he had set out to make her feel more vulnerable. She appears nude in the film, which was rare at the time.

Godwin says the original title was Sammy but Michael Balcon requested it be changed so as to avoid confusion with the film Sammy Going South. Ken Hughes wanted to call it The Small Sad World of Sammy Lee which Godwin says he liked "but the distributors got cold feet about the 'sad' bit so eventually it became The Small World of Sammy Lee. This perhaps gave the impression that it was a small picture, which it certainly wasn't."

== Music ==
Music for the film was composed by Kenny Graham. A soundtrack album did not appear at the time of the film's release, but one was later released by Trunk Records in 2013.

== Reception ==
According to Godwin, "The film had some outstanding notices, especially in the US, though it was not very well sold by the distributors. But perhaps it started out on the wrong foot because of that title problem."

=== Box Office ===
The film was a box office disaster and caused Bryanston to lose £80,000. Hughes said that "nobody came near me" after the film came out.

=== Critical ===
The Monthly Film Bulletin wrote: "It commands attention primarily by its breezy workmanship, its variety of sets and frisky dialogue. ... Script and direction look to the Mediterranean for their terms of reference – and photography to the nouvelle vague – especially in the exhilarating gallop round Soho at the outset of the film, the melancholy echo of the score in empty streets among the dustbins at dawn, and the incongruous stop shot when Sammy begins to tire of running and wants to 'get out of it'. The camera, busily trailing Sammy around club and café, shops and billiard-room, jazz-den, bedroom and bus terminal, punctuates his feverish activities with close-ups of stress, and picks up the look of reportage from time to time – but without the brittle edge of an exposé or the conviction of documentary."

Bosley Crowther in The New York Times called it "monotonous".

According to Filmink, "The film contains much to admire, including superb photography and acting ... and a glimpse of Soho of the time. It is repetitive (Sammy tries to get money, almost gets it, doesn’t) and how much you like it will very much depend on your opinion of Anthony Newley."

Andrew Pulver wrote in November 2016 for The Guardian, at the time of the film's re-release: "It’s a genuine curiosity: the last knockings of black-and-white, beat-influenced hipster cinema before a tide of gaudily-coloured, new wave-inspired, pop art films. Ken Hughes, its director, reached back to the pre-war working-class bohemianism so perfectly captured by Graham Greene and Gerald Kersh".

The Radio Times Guide to Films gave the film 2/5 stars, writing: "This fast-moving drama, expanded from a BBC TV play, finds Anthony Newley as a smart-aleck strip-show compere, spending a frantic night trying to raise cash to pay off his gambling debts. Newley was involved with several offbeat and nearly forgotten projects, but this is worth seeing for a string of appearances by familiar British television faces. The black-and-white photography makes the suitably grim Soho locations even grimmer."

British film critic Leslie Halliwell said: "Overlong 'realist' comedy-melodrama based on a TV play and filled with low-life 'characters'; vivid but cursed with a tedious hero."

In Soho on Screen, Jingan Young writes: "Low budget crime-noirs Soho Incident [1956] and The Small World of Sammy Lee are both extremely successful in utilising the urban space of Soho as a metaphor to introduce their protagonists’ state of mind."
