= Sunday in New York =

1963 film by Peter Tewksbury

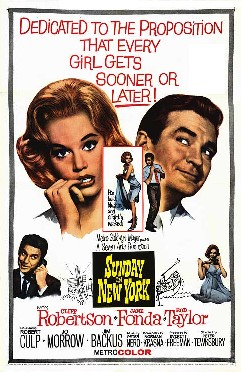
- Theatrical release poster
- Directed by: Peter Tewksbury
- Screenplay by: Norman Krasna
- Based on: Sunday in New York; 1961 play by Norman Krasna
- Produced by: Everett Freeman
- Starring: Cliff Robertson; Jane Fonda; Rod Taylor; Robert Culp; Jo Morrow; Jim Backus
- Cinematography: Leo Tover
- Edited by: Fredric Steinkamp
- Music by: Peter Nero
- Production company: Seven Arts Productions
- Distributed by: Metro-Goldwyn-Mayer
- Release date: November 13, 1963
- Running time: 105 minutes
- Country: United States
- Language: English
- Budget: $2 million
- Box office: $2 million (US/Canada rentals)

Sunday in New York is a 1963 American romantic comedy film directed by Peter Tewksbury from a screenplay by Norman Krasna, based on Krasna's 1961 play of the same name. Filmed in Metrocolor, the film stars Cliff Robertson, Jane Fonda, and Rod Taylor, with Robert Culp, Jo Morrow, and Jim Backus. The score was composed and recorded by Peter Nero, who also appears as himself performing in a nightclub; Mel Tormé sang the title song.

== Plot ==
Eileen Tyler, a 22-year-old music critic for the Albany Times Union, is suffering from her breakup with Russ Wilson, a handsome, athletic, and thoroughly self-absorbed scion of Albany's richest family. Seeking advice on the premarital sex she has refused him, she appears unannounced at the chic Upper East Side loft apartment of her elder brother Adam, an airline pilot. Eileen confides to him that she thinks she may be the only 22-year-old virgin left in the world. Adam assures her that men want women who preserve their virtue, and, at her insistence, swears he has not slept around. An anxiously anticipated rendezvous with his occasional girlfriend Mona Harris, scuttled by Eileen's arrival, lets the audience know otherwise.

Shut out of his own apartment, Adam gamely tries to find a place for a tryst with Mona, ginning a cover story for Eileen that the pair are going skating at Rockefeller Center. Some time after their departure, Adam's boss rings up, desperate to locate an "on-call" pilot. Anxious to deliver the message to her brother, Eileen heads for the skating rink, only to begin a series of misadventures with a visiting Philadelphia music critic, Mike Mitchell.

These eventually lead the pair back to Adam's apartment to dry out rain-soaked clothes together. Scotch and some double-messaging from Eileen result in an outlandish attempt on her part to seduce a bewildered but ultimately game Mike—until he discovers she is a virgin. Invoking an unspoken code of honor among sexually active males, he refuses to take hers, much to Eileen's disorientation and annoyance. After cooling off, the bumptious and still semi-clad pair begin to calmly talk things through, only to be ambushed by the unannounced arrival of an obnoxiously giddy and hellfire marriage-bent Russ. Desperate to avoid being incriminated for something worse than had actually occurred, the pair pretends Mike is Adam, a ruse that comes off smoothly until Adam himself appears in his own doorway.

A modest farce devolves into a broad one, with an irritated Adam only scarcely willing to play his unwelcome part. Socked by him for even having tried to make love to his sister, Mike attempts an orderly retreat to Philadelphia while the ruse still holds, only to end up socked later outside the apartment by Russ after Eileen tried and failed to make a clean breast of things with her by-then fiance. Adam catches Mona on the telephone; he proposes and she says yes.

Soaked again, and with Adam apparently called away to fly, Mike ends up seeking dry refuge in Adam's apartment—once more, initially all on the up-and-up. He and Eileen retire separately. After believing he has locked her in the bedroom and literally thrown the key out the window, Mike confesses his love through the door. Met with dead silence, he retreats downstairs, only to have Eileen, who had meanwhile innocently slipped there, run into his arms.

A voiceover reveals Eileen ended up married and living happily in Tokyo with Mike, bearing the adoring couple three lovely daughters.

== Cast ==
- Rod Taylor as Mike Mitchell
- Jane Fonda as Eileen Tyler
- Cliff Robertson as Adam Tyler
- Robert Culp as Russ Wilson
- Jo Morrow as Mona Harris
- Jim Backus as Chief Pilot Drysdale
- Peter Nero as himself

== Production ==
The play was seen on Broadway by Eliot Hyman and Ray Stark of Seven Arts Productions who "thought it would make a good movie", according to Stark. Other companies were interested in film rights, but Stark called Krasna direct in Switzerland and did the deal. According to one account, the rights cost $150,000 plus a percentage of the gross. Another account claims the price was $200,000.

The film was a part of a multi-picture deal between Seven Arts and MGM. Lead roles originally were offered to Natalie Wood and Warren Beatty, who turned them down. Peter Tewksbury, better known for his work in television, signed to direct. Robert Redford auditioned to reprise his stage role but said his reading "did not go well" and he was not cast.

Jane Fonda agreed to star in the film for a fee of $100,000 (equivalent to $1,052,000 in 2025). She later described her character as "an absolute bore", adding, "She talks so much about her virginity; and you know the more she talks about it, the more it's on her mind. I mean, for God's sake, let her make her mind up one way or the other—and stop all that talking."

Filming started 21 April and took place in the spring of 1963 on location in New York and on the MGM backlot in Los Angeles, with Adam's address given as 120 E. 65th Street. Rod Taylor later said he and Fonda "got on like a couple of lovely kids", adding the film "seemed like a labor of love to her... [it] was a wonderful, frothy time."

Jim Hutton, who had just made Period of Adjustment (1962) with Fonda, makes a cameo in the movie.

== Reception ==
=== Critical ===
In a review for The New York Times of the playwright's "frank screen version" of the play, Bosley Crowther characterized the film as another in a series of films that dwelled on a subject first brought to the screen ten years earlier in The Moon Is Blue: "There once was a time when the candor of Mr. Krasna's mildly popular Broadway play about an Albany girl who struggles bravely with the problem of her virtue during a rainy afternoon in New York might have caused the Production Code people a moment or two of anxious pause. They might then have thought it a bit too racy for youthful and innocent ears". On the film itself, Crowther said "the extent of the film's disconcertion and delight for a viewer will depend upon how prone one may be to a juvenile quandary and to the nimble performing of a pleasant cast. The twists of the plot are downright hackneyed—the confusions of opening the wrong doors, mistaking people and getting caught in dishabille. But the actors are all attractive, and so long as one can go along with them in their valiant attempts at pretending this is hot stuff, one may have a good time."

Variety called it "a cut above the average of its lightweight class."

According to Time magazine, "Sunday in New York is another brightly salacious Hollywood comedy about the way of a man with a maid who just may. 'This motion picture,' leers an announcement flashed on the screen as a teaser, 'is dedicated to the proposition that every girl gets...sooner or later.' As usual, winking wickedness turns out to be mostly eyewash, but the plot—more to be pitied than censored—gets a buoyant lift from stars Jane Fonda, Cliff Robertson and Rod Taylor. All three abandon themselves to the film version of Norman Krasna's trite Broadway farce with disarming faith, as though one more glossy, glittering package of pseudo sex might save the world."

In 2019, when asked if she disliked any of her films, Fonda commented that she was "surprised how many people say they love Sunday in New York. Why?"

=== Box office ===
The film broke even for the studio in North America by earning $2 million in distributor rentals.

== See also ==
- List of American films of 1963
