= Seven Arts Productions =

American film production company, 1957–1967

- Industry: Film
- Genre: Entertainment
- Founded: December 1957; 68 years ago
- Founder: Eliot Hyman; Ray Stark; Norman Katz
- Defunct: July 15, 1967; 59 years ago
- Fate: Merged with Warner Bros. Pictures to form Warner Bros.-Seven Arts
- Successors: Company; Warner Bros.-Seven Arts; Library: Warner Bros. Pictures (excluding co-productions)
- Key people: Eliot Hyman; Ray Stark; Norman Katz
- Parent: Warner Bros.-Seven Arts (1967–1969)

First logo (1957–1961)

Second logo (1964–1967)

Seven Arts Productions was a film production company established in 1957 by Eliot Hyman, Ray Stark, and Norman Katz. It produced films for distribution by other studios.

== Formation ==
The company was established in December 1957. It originated from Associated Artists Productions (AAP), managed by Ray Stark and Eliot Hyman, which specialised in acquiring older films and reselling them to television. Stark and Hyman sought to enter film production; however, AAP's principal stockholder, Louis Chesler, did not share this interest, which led to the creation of Seven Arts.

According to Stark, the company aimed to remake older Warner Bros. films or adapt previously filmed stories into stage plays. Hyman served as a private partner while continuing as president of AAP. His son, Kenneth Hyman, acted as liaison between Seven Arts and AAP. David Stillman was appointed president of Seven Arts.

=== Canadian takeover ===
Maxwell Goldhar, Kenneth Kelman, and George R. Gardiner took over Donnell & Mudge Ltd. and turned it from a tanning business into a holding and investment company. George Gardiner, president of PRM, became Donnell & Mudge's president. These connections led to Donnell & Mudge becoming a subsidiary of Associated Artists Productions. Donnell & Mudge was renamed to United Telefilms Ltd. on June 6, 1958. United Artists acquired AAP in October 1958, sold its stake in United Telefilms to a Toronto broker syndicate in April 1959, and was renamed to Creative Telefilms & Artists Ltd. on December 23, 1959. Creative Telefilm later acquired Stark and Hyman's Seven Arts Productions studio and on August 12, 1960, renamed itself to Seven Arts Productions Ltd. A U.S. television distribution subsidiary, Seven Arts Associated Corp., was formed in Delaware around the time of the rename.

== United Artists era ==
Seven Arts' first film was The Gun Runners, released by United Artists. A review in Variety remarked that Seven Arts, "by reputation, has become one of Hollywood's major independents before canning a single picture." Its second official production was Ten Seconds to Hell, a co-production with Hammer Films filmed in Germany. Seven Arts also played a significant, though often uncredited, role in co-financing Hammer's early horror films such as The Curse of Frankenstein and Dracula. The company also had early success on Broadway, helping to finance The World of Suzie Wong.

In September 1958, Seven Arts signed a five-year contract with Jacques Bergerac. In December of that year, it entered into a three-picture agreement with John Huston for Freud, Montezuma, and Lysistrata. The first film Huston ultimately made for Seven Arts was The Misfits (1961), released through United Artists.

In September 1960, Seven Arts announced plans to invest US$17.5 million in 13 to 15 films, with a total projected budget of US$30 million. These included The Misfits, West Side Story, Two for the Seesaw, and By Love Possessed for United Artists. The company also retained interests in films such as The Nun's Story, Strangers When We Meet, The Last Sunset (originally titled The Day of the Gun), and Anatomy of a Murder, due to its ownership of certain rights. In addition, it was involved in 18 Hammer Films productions in the United Kingdom. At the time, Seven Arts was also developing future projects including The Roman Spring of Mrs. Stone, The Sergeant, The Powder Keg, The Watch That Ends the Night with Tyrone Guthrie, and The Long Walk with Laurence Harvey. On Broadway, the company planned to produce a musical adaptation of Gone with the Wind and an American version of the television series Romancero. Seven Arts also invested in real estate in the Bahamas.

Disagreements eventually arose between Seven Arts and United Artists, leading to the termination of their partnership. It was agreed that three properties originally owned by Seven Arts—West Side Story, By Love Possessed, and Two for the Seesaw—would instead be produced by the Mirisch Corporation. West Side Story proved to be particularly successful. In February 1961, Kenneth Hyman relocated to London to oversee Seven Arts' European operations.

Seven Arts reported a loss of US$1,090,212 in 1960 but achieved a profit of US$1.1 million in 1961. In June 1961, the company issued its first annual report, which announced the formation of the Seven Arts–Bryanston Film Company (see below), a US$5 million real estate investment in the Bahamas, and the acquisition of the Famous Artists Agency. At the time, it had talent contracts with figures such as Fred Coe, John Patrick, John Huston, Mel Ferrer, and Isobel Lennart.

== Expansion ==
In July 1962, Seven Arts announced plans to produce twenty films for MGM over the following years, describing the agreement as "the largest single pact ever negotiated with a major distributor by an independent producing company." The company also entered into a four-picture deal with 20th Century Fox, a three-picture deal with Warner Bros. Pictures, and a two-picture deal with Columbia Pictures, in addition to its existing arrangement with the Mirisch Corporation to make films for United Artists.

The MGM deal included titles such as Lolita, The Main Attraction, Tamahine, The Night of the Iguana, A Global Affair, Sunday in New York, Of Human Bondage, The Careful Man (directed by Joshua Logan), A Candle for St. Jude by Rumer Godden, This Property Is Condemned, Film of Memory (based on a French play), The Wild Affair, Meet Me in Monte Carlo (a musical with Alain Delon and Nancy Kwan), Not That Kind of Girl, and The New Adventures of Robin Crusoe.

The 20th Century Fox agreement covered Gigot, The Other Side of the Mountain by John Patrick, The Disenchanted, and The Hunt for Kimathi. The Warner Bros. slate included The Count of Monte Cristo, Panic Button, and What Ever Happened to Baby Jane?. Columbia's agreement involved The Enchantress with Robert Mitchum and Assault on a Queen, produced by Mel Ferrer. The latter was eventually transferred to Warner Bros. and retitled Rampage.

In addition, Seven Arts announced investments in a number of projects, including The Anatolian Smile from Elia Kazan, The Lonely Passion of Judith Hearne from John Huston, an untitled film by Vittorio De Sica, Robert Rossen's adaptation of The Hostage by Brendan Behan, Dr. Strangelove, Richard Brooks's The Streetwalker, Sammy Going South, The Loneliness of the Long Distance Runner, and adaptations of Reflections in a Golden Eye and Oh Dad, Poor Dad, Mamma's Hung You in the Closet and I'm Feelin' So Sad. The company was also developing Broadway projects, including a planned musical version of Casablanca with producer David Merrick.

Not all of these projects were realised, while others were produced by different studios. Several, however, were completed, including the commercially successful What Ever Happened to Baby Jane? In May 1963, the Los Angeles Times described Seven Arts as "a deep, dark mystery" in Hollywood. At the time, the company had contract actors including Nancy Kwan, Sue Lyon, Keir Dullea, Victor Buono, Alain Delon, and Sandy Dennis.

In October 1963, Seven Arts announced plans to release three art-house films: Gentleman's Companion, Les Mystifiés, and Sammy Going South. At the same time, it was developing No Strings, Reflections in a Golden Eye, Settled Out of Court, A Candle for St. Jude, This Property Is Condemned, and Conspiracy of Silence.

Seven Arts also distributed feature films and television programs for broadcast. In 1960, Warner Bros. licensed its post-1949 library to Seven Arts for television syndication. Similar arrangements were made with 20th Century Fox and Universal Pictures. The company also acquired theatrical reissue rights to some Fox titles.

Lou Chesler's involvement in Seven Arts was controversial. In April 1964, Chesler resigned as chairman and board member to focus on his business interests in the Bahamas. As part of this transition, Seven Arts sold its stake in the Grand Bahamas Holding Company. According to some accounts, Eliot Hyman may have pushed for Chesler's departure due to Chesler's alleged connections to organised crime figures such as Meyer Lansky.

=== Bryanston ===
Seven Arts signed a co-production agreement with the British company Bryanston. The partnership produced two films, Sammy Going South and The Small World of Sammy Lee, both of which performed poorly at the box office. Seven Arts also handled the U.S. release of Bryanston's The Loneliness of the Long Distance Runner, which was another box-office disappointment.

The two companies considered co-producing Tom Jones, but withdrew due to rising production costs. The film was subsequently acquired by United Artists and went on to achieve both critical acclaim and commercial success.

=== Seven Arts Television ===
Seven Arts conducted its television distribution operations through Seven Arts Associated Corp., a Delaware subsidiary established in 1960 and marketed as Seven Arts Television. The division distributed feature films and television programming in the United States and internationally. In 1960, Warner Bros. licensed the television rights to its post-1949 feature-film library to Seven Arts. The company subsequently made similar arrangements with 20th Century Fox and Universal Pictures, and acquired the theatrical reissue rights to some Fox films.

Seven Arts Television also handled independently produced television programming. Its releases included the music series Night Train and Hal Seeger's revival of Out of the Inkwell, a package of 100 colour cartoons featuring Koko the Clown.

In 1965, Seven Arts Productions International established a syndication department to oversee the worldwide acquisition, production and sale of television programming other than feature films. W. Robert Rich, executive vice-president and general manager of Seven Arts Television, appointed Roger Carlin director of European sales and Vicente Ramos director of Latin American sales. The division became part of Warner Bros.–Seven Arts following the 1967 merger and operated as Warner Bros.–Seven Arts Television.

== Merger with Warner Bros. ==
In November 1966, Seven Arts Productions acquired a controlling interest in Warner Bros. Pictures from Jack L. Warner for US$32 million. The companies merged on July 15, 1967 as Warner Bros.-Seven Arts, which was later rebranded as Warner Bros. Inc. following its acquisition by Kinney National Company in 1969.

In his final year as head of production, Ray Stark remarked that he "hated ten" of the eleven films he produced, with the exception of Arrivederci Baby. He stated that his favourite productions at Seven Arts were The World of Suzie Wong, The Night of the Iguana, and Reflections in a Golden Eye, all of which, he noted, were made independently of Eliot Hyman. Stark nonetheless described Hyman as "the smartest TV man in the business—and a financial wizard". Reflecting on his role at Seven Arts, Stark commented that "what I have really been is a deal maker. When you turn out a lot of film I guess there's a certain security." He later expressed his wish to focus more on producing.

== Other uses ==
Neither the later Seven Arts Pictures nor the defunct releasing company Seven Arts—a joint venture formed in the early 1990s between Carolco Pictures and New Line Cinema (which later merged into Warner Bros.)—was related to the original Seven Arts Productions.

== Selected filmography ==
=== For United Artists ===
- The Gun Runners (1958) – first film from Seven Arts
- Subway in the Sky (1959)
- Ten Seconds to Hell (1959) – also with Hammer Films
- The Misfits (1961)
- By Love Possessed (1961) – with The Mirisch Company
- West Side Story (1961) – with The Mirisch Company
- Two for the Seesaw (1962) – with The Mirisch Company

=== For Paramount Pictures ===
- Thunder in the Sun (1959)
- Seven Days in May (1964) – with Joel Productions, John Frankenheimer Productions
- Promise Her Anything (1965)
- Is Paris Burning? (1966)
- This Property Is Condemned (1966)
- Assault on a Queen (1966)
- Drop Dead Darling (1966), also known as Arrivederci, Baby!
- Oh Dad, Poor Dad, Mamma's Hung You in the Closet and I'm Feelin' So Sad (1967)

=== For Warner Bros. ===
- The Roman Spring of Mrs. Stone (1961)
- The Count of Monte Cristo (1961) – French production
- What Ever Happened to Baby Jane? (1962)
- Rampage (1963)

=== For 20th Century Fox ===
- Gigot (1962)
- The Bible: In the Beginning... (1966)

=== For Woodfall ===
- The Loneliness of the Long Distance Runner (1962)

=== For MGM ===
- Lolita (1962)
- The Main Attraction (1962)
- Sunday in New York (1963)
- The Night of the Iguana (1964)
- A Global Affair (1964)
- Tamahine (1963)
- Of Human Bondage (1964)
- The Hill (1965)
- The Dirty Dozen (1967)

=== For Hammer Films ===
(Most of these were released in the United States through 20th Century Fox)

- Ten Seconds to Hell (1959)
- The Hound of the Baskervilles (1959)
- The Terror of the Tongs (1961)
- She (1965)
- Die! Die! My Darling! (1965)
- The Nanny (1965)
- Rasputin the Mad Monk (1966)
- The Plague of the Zombies (1966)
- Dracula: Prince of Darkness (1966)
- The Reptile (1966)
- One Million Years B.C. (1966)
- The Witches (1966)
- Slave Girls (1967)
- The Viking Queen (1967)
- A Challenge for Robin Hood (1967)
- Frankenstein Created Woman (1967)
- The Anniversary (1968)
- Quatermass and the Pit (1968)
- The Vengeance of She (1968)
- The Lost Continent (1968)
- The Devil Rides Out (1968)
- Dracula Has Risen from the Grave (1968)

=== For Bryanston ===
- Sammy Going South (1963) – distributed through Paramount
- The Small World of Sammy Lee (1964)
- The Wild Affair (1963)

=== For Associated British ===
- Why Bother to Knock? (1964, U.S. release), also known as Don't Bother to Knock

=== For Allied Artists ===
- Never Put It in Writing (1964)

=== Self-produced films ===
- Once Before I Die (1966)
- You're a Big Boy Now (1966)
- The Defector (1966)
- Reflections in a Golden Eye (1967)
- The Shuttered Room (1967)

=== For Gold Star ===
- The Frozen Dead (1966)
- It! (1967)

=== Other ===
- Invincible Gladiator (1961; U.S. release in 1964 by Seven Arts)

== Theatre credits ==
- The World of Suzie Wong (1958–1960)
- Two for the Seesaw (1958)
- Rhinoceros (1960) – invested in the original Broadway production
- Everybody Loves Opal (1961)
- Watch the Birdie! (1964)
- Funny Girl (1964–1967)
- Any Wednesday (1964–1966)
- The Owl and the Pussycat (1964–1965)

== Unfilmed projects ==
- The Gentleman's Gentlemen (1958)
- The Intruder (1958), based on the novel by Charles Beaumont — later filmed in 1962 by Roger Corman
- Montezuma (1958), script by John Huston and Philip Yordan (unproduced)
- Lysistrata (1958), script by Charles Kaufman (unproduced)
- Irresistible (1958), by Daniel Mainwaring (unproduced)
- Mrs 'Arris Goes to Paris (1959), by Paul Gallico – intended as both a musical and a film; later adapted into TV films in 1992 and 2022
- Sundown at Crazy Horse (unproduced)
- There Was a Little Girl (1961), by Daniel Taradash (unproduced)
- The Lonely Passion of Judith Hearn, from the novel by Brian Moore, to be directed by John Huston — later filmed in 1987 as The Lonely Passion of Judith Hearne
- The Voyagers, by Jacques Deval (unproduced)
- A Candle for St Jude, based on the novel by Rumer Godden, with a script by John Patrick, intended as a vehicle for Nancy Kwan (unproduced)
- The Singlehander (1961), to be directed by Louis Malle (unproduced)
- Marco Polo, produced by Raoul Levy and starring Alain Delon — filming began but was abandoned
- The Man Who Would Be King, directed by John Huston, from the story by Rudyard Kipling — later filmed in 1975 with Huston directing
- Fifth Coin, based on a script by Francis Ford Coppola (unproduced)

=== Unmade stage productions ===
- Howell and Hummell – based on Richard Rovere's 1947 biography about two lawyers; book by Joseph Heller, music by Saul Chaplin, produced by Diane Krasny (unproduced)
- The Legendary Mizeners – about the Mizener brothers, by S. N. Behrman, produced by Diane Krasny (unproduced)
- Wind It Up and It Breaks, by Cy Howard (unproduced)
- Mrs 'Arris Goes to Paris — not staged, though the novel was later adapted into a 1992 TV film and a 2022 film
- French Street (unproduced)
