= W. H. Canaway =

English writer

- Born: William Hamilton Canaway; June 12, 1925; Altrincham, Cheshire, England, UK
- Died: May 22, 1988 (aged 62); Derbyshire, England, UK
- Education: University College of North Wales, Bangor
- Occupations: Novelist; Screenwriter; Lecturer
- Writing career
- Pen name: Bill Canaway
- Period: 1957–1988
- Genres: Adventure fiction; Historical fiction; Nature writing
- Notable works: Sammy Going South (1961); The IPCRESS File (1965 screenplay)

William Hamilton Canaway (1925 – 22 May 1988) was the author of novels that combined adventure with natural history and a love of the outdoors. He was born in 1925 in Altrincham, Cheshire, England, UK, and died on 22 May 1988 (age 62) in Derbyshire, England, UK.

Canaway's 1961 novel Sammy Going South was made into an adventure film in 1963.

As Bill Canaway, he co-wrote the screenplay for the 1965 film version of Len Deighton's The IPCRESS File.

== Novels ==
- A Creel of Willow (1957)
- A Snowdon Stream (The Gwyrfai) (1958)
- The Ring-Givers (1958)
- The Seal (1959)
- Sammy Going South (1961)
- Find the Boy: 2 (1961)
- The Hunter and the Horns (1962)
- My feet upon a rock (1963)
- Crows in a Green Tree (1965)
- The Grey Seas of Jutland (1966)
- The Mules of Borgo San Marco (1967)
- A Moral Obligation (1969)
- A Declaration of Independence (1971)
- Harry Doing Good (1973)
- The Glory of the Seas (1974)
- Seal (1975)
- The Willow-Pattern War (1976)
- The Trouble Trip (1976)
- The Solid Gold Buddha (1979)
- The Helmet and the Cross (1987)
