= The Grey Seas of Jutland =

Novel about the First World War

- Author: W. H. Canaway
- Language: English
- Publisher: Hutchinson
- Publication date: 1966
- Publication place: United Kingdom
- Media type: Print (hardback & paperback)
- Pages: 256

The Grey Seas of Jutland is a 1966 novel by W. H. Canaway.

== Plot introduction ==
Two cousins, one British and one German, join their country's naval forces and fall in love with the same girl. Their ongoing rivalry comes to a head in the thick of the Great War, when their ships close for action in the Battle of Jutland. The Author points out that no destroyer named Nilotic took part in the Jutland action, and that no capital ship named Sachsen was involved. He acknowledges a debt of gratitude to Captain Geoffrey Bennett, Royal Navy.

The book is divided into two major sections; Time Growing and Time Fighting.

== Plot ==
At the beginning of the 1900s, George Wynne is growing up in his Father's Herefordshire rectory. He is intended for the Church, but a chance encounter with a sailor sets him on the track of a naval career. George meets his German cousin, Werner Stelling who is inspired by George to also aim for a naval career. They both fall in love with their beautiful but wayward American cousin, Claire Edwardes.

The cousins go through their country's naval colleges and are commissioned. George proposes marriage to Claire, but she evades the issue, eventually confessing to a long-standing sexual affair with a young farmhand on the family estate. George is horrified, but does not tell Claire of his own experience with a prostitute in the London docklands.

George's sister June is married to a local farmer. After the celebrations, Claire's Mother, who is going through a divorce, makes clumsy drunken advances to George. She reveals that Claire has loved only Werner.

By the start of the Great War, George is a Lieutenant, and Werner is a Leutnant zur See.

May 1916 finds George in command of HMS Nilotic, a torpedo destroyer, part of a flotilla steaming out of the Firth of Forth into the North Sea. The flotilla will join the Grand Fleet under Admiral Jellicoe, which will shortly be involved in the Battle of Jutland. Werner is serving aboard the battleship Sachsen, part of the German High Seas Fleet commanded by Admiral Scheer.

Nilotic is soon in the thick of the fighting. George uses a brief respite to re-read a letter from Claire; she has married another man. Then a lookout spots the Sachsen. Consumed with rage, George deliberately disobeys orders and alters course to intercept the Sachsen. In the ensuing action, both of the ships are critically damaged and most of the George's crew are killed. George is forced to abandon ship, but not before firing his last torpedo at the German ship. Both George and Werner find themselves in the water; George tries to kill Werner with his remaining strength, but fails. The cousins are rescued by a Swedish ship. Headed for internment, a kind of peace is made between them.
