= Associated Artists Productions =

American entertainment company

Associated Artists Productions, Inc.
- Formerly: Associated Artists (1948–1951); PRM, Inc. (1954–1956); Associated Artists Productions, Inc. (1956–1958); United Artists Associated (1958–1968)
- Type: Private
- Industry: Television syndication
- Founded: 1948 (first incarnation); 1954 (second incarnation)
- Founder: Eliot Hyman
- Defunct: October 1958 (as Associated Artists Productions); 1968 (as United Artists Associated)
- Fate: Folded into United Artists, assets merged with Turner Entertainment Co.
- Successors: United Artists Television
- Headquarters: New York City, United States
- Products: Television packages of feature films and theatrical short subjects and cartoons
- Owner: Eliot Hyman (1948–1951; 1954–1958)
- Parent: United Artists (1958–1968)
- Subsidiaries: The 199 Corp.; a.a.p. Records, Inc.

Associated Artists Productions, Inc. (styled as a.a.p.), later known as United Artists Associated, was an American distributor of theatrical feature films and short subjects for television. Associated Artists Productions was the copyright owner of the Popeye the Sailor shorts by Paramount Pictures, and the pre-1950 Warner Bros. Pictures film library, notably the pre-August 1948 color Looney Tunes and Merrie Melodies series of animated shorts, and the black-and-white Merrie Melodies shorts from Harman-Ising, excluding Lady, Play Your Mandolin!.

== History ==
=== Associated Artists ===
Associated Artists was founded in 1948 by Eliot Hyman. It handled syndication of around 500 films, including the Republic Pictures and Robert L. Lippert libraries, but both companies soon entered television distribution. It also handled syndication for Monogram Pictures and Producers Releasing Corporation.

In 1951, Hyman sold the company to David Baird's Lansing Foundation, which in turn sold it to the startup company Motion Pictures for Television (MPTV), where Hyman served as a consultant. Hyman also became a partner in Mouline Productions, the producers of Moby Dick, while financing and producing other films and TV projects.

=== Associated Artists Productions ===
In July 1954, Hyman launched another TV distribution company which used the Associated Artists name, Associated Artists Productions, Inc., with the purchase of the syndication rights to the Universal Sherlock Holmes films from MPTV. His son Ken served as vice-president. Associated Artists Productions also acquired distribution rights to Johnny Jupiter, Candid Camera, thirteen Artcinema Associates feature films, thirty-seven Western films, and three serials. In March 1956, Hyman's company was acquired by PRM, Inc., an investment firm headed by Lou Chesler.

PRM closed the purchase of the entire pre-December 1949 Warner Bros. Pictures library in February 1956 for $21 million, with a.a.p. and its theatrical subsidiary Dominant Pictures handling distribution sales. On December 5, 1956, PRM changed its name to Associated Artists Productions Corp.

A.A.P. also purchased the Popeye the Sailor cartoons produced by Fleischer Studios and Famous Studios from Paramount Pictures on June 11, 1956. This purchase and the Warner Bros. cartoon package combined gave A.A.P. a library of over 568 theatrical cartoon shorts, which would be staples of children's television for many years. Warner Bros. and King Features Syndicate retained merchandising rights to the characters in each respective cartoon package.

In January 1957, A.A.P. announced plans to purchase the short subject library of Metro-Goldwyn-Mayer for $4.5 million. Around 900 shorts would be included in the package such as the Tom and Jerry cartoons and Pete Smith comedies, among others. Although the deal was nearly finalized, it fell through, reportedly due to the price of the sale. MGM would then distribute the shorts themselves through their own in-house television subsidiary Metro TV.

National Telefilm Associates announced plans to buy control of AAP Corp. on November 18, 1957. By December 16, 1957, control of A.A.P. was the subject of litigation which was passed on to the New York Supreme Court between the parties of A.A.P., NTA, and Harris minority shareholder group.

=== United Artists Associated ===
The company was acquired by United Artists (UA) in 1958, with UA borrowing the full amount $27 million from Manufacturers Trust when A.A.P. shareholders needed cash quickly. The A.A.P. purchase did come with the uncollected accounts' receivable amount around the purchase price. Several employers left AAP, including employer Ray Stark, so the group formed Seven Arts Productions. The resulting division was named United Artists Associated, Inc. (styled as u.a.a.). U.A.A. made a deal to distribute Beany and Cecil internationally. With the twin syndicated packages of Looney Tunes/Merrie Melodies and Popeye, U.A.A. took a look at a number of shorts in the A.A.P./pre-1950 WB library that appealed to children and packaged them in a third group known as The Big Mac Show, which has a cartoon wrap around.

== Library ==
AAP's library includes:

- Warner Bros. Pictures' films released prior to January 1, 1950, excluding films that are either in the public domain or owned by third-party companies
  - Distribution rights to the pre-September 1948 The Vitaphone Corporation library
    - Distribution rights to the pre-August 1948 Warner Bros. Cartoons library, excluding films that are in the public domain (color cartoons and Bugs Bunny: Superstar only) (Note: The latest released Warner Bros. cartoon sold to a.a.p. was Haredevil Hare, which was released on July 24, 1948.)
      - Distribution rights to every Harman and Ising-produced Merrie Melodies cartoon, except Lady, Play Your Mandolin!
- The Fleischer Studios/Famous Studios Popeye cartoons, originally released by Paramount Pictures between 1933 and 1957

== Film archive ==
In 1969, the United Artists Corporation presented to the Library of Congress the earliest surviving preprint material from the pre-1950 Warner Bros. Pictures film library (including First National Pictures). The collection contains 200 silent features (1918–29), 800 sound features (1926–50), 1,800 sound shorts (1926–48), and 337 Looney Tunes and Merrie Melodies shorts (1931–48). While consisting largely of Warner Bros. releases, the collection includes nearly two hundred sound features released by Monogram Pictures Corporation between 1936 and 1946 and 231 Popeye cartoons produced by Fleischer Studios and Famous Studios released between 1933 and 1957. Most motion pictures exist in the original black-and-white/Technicolor camera negatives. The Library is converting those items on nitrate to safety film stock and has obtained reference prints for seventy of the better known Warner Bros. features, such as Gold Diggers of 1935 (1935), High Sierra (1941), I Am a Fugitive from a Chain Gang (1932), The Jazz Singer (1927), and Little Caesar (1930). There are no United Artists films (such as James Bond and The Pink Panther franchise; these are owned by Metro-Goldwyn-Mayer) in the United Artists Collection. The early synchronized sound Vitaphone shorts are lacking accompanying sound discs.

This is a large collection of nitrate negatives and masters, which are still undergoing transfer to acetate stock. Most of the safety film copies exist only in the preservation master stage, limiting accessibility for viewing and duplication. Some years ago, the Library of Congress obtained 16mm prints (though many are television prints, flat in picture quality and occasionally edited) for the pre-1950 Warner Bros. features. Additional prints have been added to the collection, ranging from "reject fine grain master positives" (copies made for preservation but deemed inadequate) suitable for reference use, to high-quality 35mm prints reserved for theatrical projection. United Artists also sent 16mm prints of most of the Warner Bros. and Monogram films to the Wisconsin Center for Film and Theater Research, such as My Four Years in Germany (1918), Conductor 1492 (1924), Midnight Lovers (1926) and Joe Palooka in Triple Cross (1951).

Titles and holdings are listed in the various M/B/RS catalogs. There are a number of published reference books on Warner Bros. films. Copyrights are still in effect for most of the films in this collection; a donor restriction also applies. United Artists has passed through various hands, but current ownership of this material resides with Turner Entertainment Co.

== Ownership of properties ==
Metro-Goldwyn-Mayer purchased United Artists, including the A.A.P. library, from Transamerica Corporation in May 1981 and became MGM/UA Entertainment Co.

On June 16, 1982, Warner Communications was in talks to buy back rights to the pre-1950 Warner Bros. Pictures library (along with the pre-1948 Warner Bros. live-action and animation shorts) from MGM/UA for $100 million in cash. The MGM-Warner deal was terminated on July 28 of that same year, after two companies failed to complete acquisitions of MGM/UA's record company asset and the pre-1950 Warner Bros. film libraries; the main reason is that the negotiations fell apart because of dozens of unresolved points, probably relating to the oldest Warner Bros. films.

Turner Broadcasting System (via Turner Entertainment Co.) took over the library in 1986 during Ted Turner's brief ownership of MGM/UA. When Turner sold back the MGM/UA production unit, he kept the MGM library, including the Warner Bros. Pictures films and Popeye cartoons from the A.A.P. library, for his own company.

The Warner Bros. film libraries were reunited in 1996 when Time Warner, then the parent company of Warner Bros., bought Turner. Turner remains the copyright owner in name only to the former Associated Artists Productions properties, while Skydance Corporation (including Warner Bros. Pictures and Warner Bros. Clockwork) handles their distribution.

== Subsidiaries ==
- The 199 Corp. was the subsidiary that held the rights to the Monogram Pictures catalogue under the United Artists Television trademark.
- a.a.p. Records, Inc. was a music arm of A.A.P., which distributed the Official Popeye TV Album.
- United Telefilms Limited was the Canadian division of A.A.P., which existed around the same time. Live action films used a variation of the main A.A.P. logo, but the initials "UTL" would be spelled out, and a notice at the bottom said "Distributed in Canada by United Telefilms Limited". United Artists sold UT to a Toronto broker syndicate in April 1959 and it eventually became Seven Arts Productions Ltd.
  - United Telefilm Records was a music label of United Telefilms.
    - UT Records, Tel Records, and Warwick Records were subsidiaries of United Telefilm Records.
- Dominant Pictures Corporation was a subsidiary of A.A.P., which distributed the features that the company purchased to theaters. It re-released a number of films from the pre-1950 WB library, as well as a number of British films which A.A.P. bought the rights to. Dominant also sold and/or leased 16mm prints of WB library titles to non-theatrical rental libraries. The subsidiary was later folded into UA's main theatrical distribution arm after the company was sold to UA. Some pre-1931 WB library is considered lost.
