= Gigot (film) =

1962 film by Gene Kelly

- Theatrical release poster
- Directed by: Gene Kelly
- Screenplay by: John Patrick
- Story by: Jackie Gleason
- Produced by: Kenneth Hyman
- Starring: Jackie Gleason
- Cinematography: Jean Bourgoin
- Edited by: Roger Dwyre
- Music by: Jackie Gleason
- Color process: Color by DeLuxe
- Production company: Seven Arts Productions
- Distributed by: 20th Century-Fox
- Release date: November 1962
- Running time: 105 minutes
- Country: United States
- Language: English
- Budget: $1.5 million
- Box office: $1.6 million (rentals)

Gigot (English: /dʒiːˈɡoʊ/, French: [ʒiɡo]) is a 1962 American comedy-drama film directed by Gene Kelly and starring Jackie Gleason.

== Plot ==
Gigot (Gleason) (the name means "leg of mutton" in French) is a mute Frenchman living in a cellar in the Ménilmontant district of Paris in the 1920s. He ekes out a hand-to-mouth existence as a janitor at his landlady's apartment building. He is routinely treated with condescension by neighbors and often is made the butt of practical jokes. However, he is a decent and kindhearted fellow, traits not unnoticed by children and the animals he often feeds. Gigot has one unusual predilection: he is attracted by funeral processions and finds himself attending, whether or not he ever knew the departed. He can't help but cry along with all the other mourners.

After being abused by locals at a pub, he chances upon a woman, Colette (Katherine Kath), and her 6-year-old daughter Nicole (Diane Gardner), huddled in a doorway trying to stay dry. He takes them to his dingy basement abode, gives them what food and drink he has, a bed to sleep in, and shelter from the rain. Colette is suspicious but is so exhausted that she accepts.

Gigot gleefully dotes upon Nicole. Gigot is astonished to discover she is ignorant of what a church is, completely unaware of God. Nicole points to a crucifix and asks about it. The mute attempts to convey the identity and significance of Christ as the savior of the world, but Nicole cannot understand. Frustrated at his inability to explain, Gigot begins punching himself in the face, until Nicole cries for him to stop, and reassures him by imitating the motions Gigot used in his own attempts to explain.

Gigot entertains the little girl by dancing to his old gramophone, and by dressing as a waiter to feed his pet mouse. He is very protective, running alongside her on a merry-go-round to make sure she doesn't fall off. He also intervenes to protect Colette's honor while she is, in fact, in the act of propositioning a man who has sexual intercourse with prostitutes, to pick her and use her services on a bench near the merry-go-round. Gigot is beaten by the frustrated man and the john's compatriot for his trouble.

Furious over his interference with her "activities," Colette threatens to bolt with Nicole unless Gigot can provide her a life with a "man of means." Given only an hour to prove himself, Gigot happens past a bakery. The baker and his wife (having taken advantage of him for years) have been called away, thus leaving their till unattended. Gigot seizes the opportunity and steals their money.

With those ill-gotten gains, Gigot goes on a shopping spree, buying much-needed new clothes for Colette and Nicole, with a straw boater and a shave for himself. He buys a grand meal and drinks for all at a restaurant. But the good times are not to last — Colette's ex-boyfriend wants her back, and Colette succumbs. She expects to take Nicole along, but her pimp persuades her to wait.

The next morning, two bumbling bureaucrats try to remove Gigot to a home for the feeble-minded. Meanwhile, the baker has discovered the theft, and when Colette returns, Gigot and Nicole are missing. Gigot becomes a suspect, but he and Nicole are only playing at an abandoned basement chamber below the streets of Paris, while Gigot dances for her with so much gusto that the roof timbers fall in. They are nearly buried in rubble and Nicole is unconscious. Gigot rushes the girl to the church where the priest calls a doctor, but hearing Nicole feebly asking for him to play the music Gigot rushes out to retrieve the gramophone. While returning, he runs into the angry mob and flees. During the chase the gramophone falls onto the conveyor mechanism of a coal loader. Desperate to retrieve it for Nicole's sake, Gigot ignores the danger and warnings of the crowd chasing him and climbs into the loader. Ultimately the conveyor dumps the gramophone and Gigot down a chute with both falling into the river. The crowd rushes to the bank to find him and desperately try to warn off a ship heading towards the spot where Gigot disappeared. The warnings have no effect, and Gigot's hat is seen floating on the surface of the water in the wake of the ship's passing.

Thinking him dead, the locals are despondent over their despicable actions. In remorse they organize a funeral for Gigot, though all they have is his chapeau to bury. Gigot survived and is merely hiding. Unknowingly, he witnesses his own funeral procession and as usual is compelled to join it. When the time comes for the eulogy, he realizes it is for him. Gigot is spotted by the crowd and the chase begins again.

== Cast ==
Gigot (Jackie Gleason) and Nicole (Diane Gardner) cater a mouse's dinner in Gigot.

- Jackie Gleason as Gigot
- Katherine Kath as Colette
- Gabrielle Dorziat as Madame Brigitte
- Jean Lefebvre as Gaston
- Jacques Marin as Jean
- Albert Rémy as Alphonse (as Albert Remy)
- Yvonne Constant as Lucille Duval
- Germaine Delbat as Madame Greuze
- Albert Dinan as Bistro Proprietor
- Diane Gardner as Nicole
- Frank Villard as Pierre (as Franck Villard)
- Camille Guérini as Priest (as Camille Guerini)
- René Havard as Albert
- Louis Falavigna as Monsieur Duval
- Jean Michaud as Gendarme
- Richard Francoeur as Baker
- Paula Dehelly as Baker's Wife
- Jack Ary as Blade (as Jacques Ary)

== Background and other information ==
Gleason had conceived the story himself years earlier and had long dreamed of making the film. He wanted Orson Welles as director, and Paddy Chayefsky as screenwriter. Though Welles was an old friend, the board at Fox rejected him as being an overspender. Gene Kelly was selected as a compromise. Chayefsky was not interested and John Patrick, writer of Teahouse of the August Moon, was signed instead.

The film was shot on location in Paris. Most of the production crew and cast were French; some spoke no English. Gleason bore with this in two ways: Kelly spoke French, and Gleason's character had no lines, being mute.

Gleason was extremely proud of the film, which earned one Academy Award nomination for Best Adapted Score. Gleason himself was nominated for a Golden Globe for Best Actor (Drama), but lost to Gregory Peck. Gleason received a story credit and a music credit. On the other hand, according to the book, The Films of Gene Kelly, by Tony Thomas, Kelly himself said that the film "had been so drastically cut and reedited that it had little to do with my version".

== Reception ==
When the movie was shown at the Radio City Music Hall, The New York Times critic Bosley Crowther did not much care for Gigot: "[Gleason's] characterization of a lonely, unspeaking vagabond, who hungers for social acceptance and the warmth of somebody's love, is modeled after Chaplin... [U]nfortunately, Mr. Gleason, for all his recognized comic skill when it comes to cutting broad and grotesque capers, as he does now and then, does not have the power of expression or the subtleties of physical attitude to convey the poignant implications of such a difficult, delicate role."

Prolific critic Leslie Halliwell was not nearly so polite: "[A] grotesque piece of self-indulgence, the arch example of the clown who wanted to play Hamlet. Plotless, mawkish and wholly unfunny."

Life magazine was perhaps more taken with the spirit of the film, calling it a "genial fable. Gleason portrays a Parisian ragamuffin who, though trapped in a world of silence and poverty, finds great joy in just being alive." The unsigned piece observes that "Because he cannot speak, people think Gigot is a fool and constantly make cruel fun of him. But like all legendary simpletons, Gigot has a heart of 36-carat gold and when he outsmarts the smart alecks, many customers in a good many lands are going to have their happiest cry since Little Red Ridinghood...."

Shamus Gwynn of the Irish Independent said “The movie touched me as a child long before I burdened myself with the yoke of a critic. Then upon my professional review many years later, I found the movie still moved me and does to this day. A subtle classic.”

In its entry on Jackie Gleason, the Encyclopedia of Hollywood Film Actors said the performer had "some starring vehicles, of which Gigot, from a story by Gleason himself, was the noblest attempt. In it he played, quite nicely, a mute, slow-witted Parisian janitor, but the extreme sentimentality of the whole piece turned off both critics and public."

Kelly later said "the people I wanted to like it didn't; it was not my picture when it ended up. Seven Arts made 40 and more cuts or changes without telling Jackie Gleason or me; we were both very unhappy about it."

Fox studio head Richard D. Zanuck claimed that the film was so unsuccessful that the studio was reluctant to approve Gleason to star in subsequent roles when he was mentioned for the lead of The French Connection.

== Remake ==
In 2004, the film was remade for television as The Wool Cap with William H. Macy.

== See also ==
- List of American films of 1962
- List of films featuring the deaf and hard of hearing
