= Warner Bros.–Seven Arts =

American entertainment company (1967–69)

Warner Bros.–Seven Arts, Inc.
- Type: Public
- Industry: Film; Television; Music
- Genre: Entertainment
- Predecessor: Warner Bros. Pictures, Inc. (1923–1967); Seven Arts Productions (1957–1967)
- Founded: July 15, 1967; 59 years ago
- Defunct: December 16, 1969; 56 years ago
- Fate: Acquired by Kinney National Services Inc. and rebranded as Warner Bros. Inc.
- Successor: Warner Bros. Inc. (1969–present)
- Headquarters: 4000 Warner Boulevard, Burbank, California, United States
- Area served: Worldwide
- Key people: Benjamin Kalmenson (President); Haskel Masters (Vice-President); Jack L. Warner (Vice-Chairman of the board); Eliot Hyman (Chairman of the board)
- Owner: Kinney National Services (1969)
- Parent: Independent (1967–1969); Kinney National Services Inc. (July–December 1969)
- Subsidiaries: Warner Bros.–Seven Arts Television; Warner Bros.–Seven Arts Records; Atlantic Records; Seven Arts Productions; Warner Bros.–Seven Arts Animation

Warner Bros.–Seven Arts, Inc., doing business as Warner Bros–Seven Arts or W7, was an American multinational entertainment and music conglomerate. After Jack L. Warner sold his controlling interest in Warner Bros. Pictures, Inc., Seven Arts Productions acquired the company and later merged the two companies on June 30, 1967. Within two years, W7 was acquired by Kinney National Services in 1969.

== History ==
Seven Arts Productions acquired Jack L. Warner's controlling interest in Warner Bros. Pictures for $32 million in November 1966. The merger between the two companies was completed by July 15, 1967, and the combined company was named Warner Bros.–Seven Arts. Hyman, founder of Seven Arts, was named chairman. Warner Bros. Pictures president Benjamin Kalmenson served as president of the combined company. Warner remained on the board as vice chairman. Alan Hirschfield was named financial vice president in October.

The head of production was Hyman's son, Kenneth Hyman. During his tenure, Hyman oversaw the production of hits like Bullitt, Girl On A Motorcycle, Rachel, Rachel and The Heart Is a Lonely Hunter, and The Wild Bunch, as well as George Lucas' first film THX 1138.

In February 1968, Warner Bros.–Seven Arts sold its 25% stake in Associated British Pictures Corporation to Electric & Musical Industries.

The acquisition included Warner Bros. Records (which was renamed Warner Bros.–Seven Arts Records), and Reprise Records. Later that same year, Warner Bros.–Seven Arts also purchased Atlantic Records.

=== Acquisition by Kinney ===
Within a year of the acquisition, Warner Bros.–Seven Arts was fielding merger offers. By 1969, it had become a takeover target for multiple companies, including Commonwealth United Corporation, National General Corporation, and Kinney National Service. However, concern over antitrust laws ultimately ruled out National General and Commonwealth, leaving Kinney as the preferred suitor. Kinney sold its Ashley Famous talent agency in order to avoid any conflict of interest in the deal.

Warner Bros.–Seven Arts was officially acquired by Kinney National Company on July 4, 1969. The Hymans resigned from the company and Ted Ashley was named chairman of the film studio in August. On December 16, 1969, Warner Bros.–Seven Arts was rebranded as Warner Bros. Inc.

The final film to be released under the Warner Bros.–Seven Arts name was Frankenstein Must Be Destroyed, which was released on February 11, 1970. The studio's next film, Woodstock, which was released in March, was credited as a Warner Bros. production, and this credit would be applied to all other productions from the studio afterward with Warner Bros. reestablished as a major film studio.

In September 1971, Kinney National spun off its non-entertainment assets as National Kinney Corporation, and changed its name to Warner Communications Inc. on February 10, 1972.

== Filmography ==
- The Shuttered Room (1967)
- Bonnie and Clyde (1967)
- Camelot (1967)
- Reflections in a Golden Eye (1967)
- Wait Until Dark (1967)
- Cool Hand Luke (1967)
- The Cats (1968)
- Firecreek (1968)
- Countdown (1968)
- Norman Normal (1968); produced by Warner Bros.–Seven Arts Animation
- Bye Bye Braverman (1968)
- Kona Coast (1968)
- Chubasco (1968)
- Petulia (1968)
- The Heart Is a Lonely Hunter (1968)
- The Green Berets (1968)
- Assignment to Kill (1968)
- I Love You, Alice B. Toklas (1968)
- Rachel, Rachel (1968)
- Finian's Rainbow (1968)
- Bullitt (1968)
- Sweet November (1968)
- The Sea Gull (1968)
- The Sergeant (1968)
- Dracula Has Risen from the Grave (1968); with Hammer Films
- The Picasso Summer (1969)
- The Big Bounce (1969)
- 2000 Years Later (1969)
- The Wild Bunch (1969)
- The Learning Tree (1969)
- The Rain People (1969)
- The Valley of Gwangi (1969); with Hammer Films
- The Great Bank Robbery (1969)
- Moon Zero Two (1969); with Hammer Films
- Once You Kiss a Stranger (1969)
- The Sweet Body of Deborah (1969)
- The Arrangement (1969)
- Jeff (1969); with Alain Delon's Adel Productions
- Looney Tunes and Merrie Melodies shorts (1967–69); produced by Warner Bros.–Seven Arts Animation
- The Rise and Rise of Michael Rimmer (1970); with David Paradine Productions and London Weekend Television
- Crescendo (1970)
- Last of the Mobile Hot Shots (1970)
- Start the Revolution Without Me (1970)
- Frankenstein Must Be Destroyed (1970); with Hammer Films

== See also ==
- List of record labels
