= United Telefilm Records =

Canadian owned record label

- Founded: 1959
- Founder: United Telefilms Limited
- Country of origin: United States

United Telefilm Records was a Canadian owned record label, a division of United Telefilms Limited, based in New York. It was the founded in 1959.

It was the mother label of Warwick Records.

== See also ==
- List of record labels
