= Kenneth Hyman =

American film producer (1928–2026)

- Born: December 11, 1928; New York City, U.S.
- Died: January 29, 2026 (aged 97); Oxfordshire, England
- Occupation: Film producer
- Notable work: The Dirty Dozen
- Father: Eliot Hyman

Kenneth Hyman (December 11, 1928 – January 29, 2026) was an American film producer, best known for The Dirty Dozen (1967). The son of Eliot Hyman, he was head of UK operations for Seven Arts Productions and head of production for Warner Bros.-Seven Arts. While head of Warner Bros.-Seven Arts, among his achievements was hiring black director Gordon Parks for The Learning Tree (1969).

Hyman was born in New York City on December 11, 1928. He was raised in Westport, Connecticut. Hyman died in Oxfordshire, England, on January 29, 2026, at the age of 97.

== Filmography ==
- The Hound of the Baskervilles (1959)
- The Stranglers of Bombay (1959)
- The Terror of the Tongs (1961)
- Gigot (1962)
- What Ever Happened to Baby Jane? (1962)
- The Hill (1965)
- The Dirty Dozen (1967)
- Emperor of the North Pole (1973)
