= Sammy Going South =

1963 British film by Alexander Mackendrick

- 1963 British cinema poster
- Directed by: Alexander Mackendrick
- Screenplay by: Denis Cannan
- Based on: Sammy Goes South by W.H. Canaway
- Produced by: Hal Mason
- Starring: Edward G. Robinson
- Cinematography: Erwin Hillier
- Edited by: Jack Harris
- Music by: Tristram Cary
- Production companies: Great Shows, Ltd. Bryanston Films
- Distributed by: Bryanston Films (UK); Paramount Pictures (US)
- Release date: 21 April 1963 (UK)
- Running time: 118 minutes
- Country: United Kingdom
- Language: English
- Budget: £385,000

United States theatrical poster for "A Boy Ten Feet Tall"

Sammy Going South (retitled A Boy Ten Feet Tall for its later US release) is a 1963 British adventure film directed by Alexander Mackendrick, photographed by Erwin Hillier and starring Edward G. Robinson, Fergus McClelland and Constance Cummings.

Sammy Going South was based on a 1961 novel by W. H. Canaway and adapted for the screen by Denis Cannan. It was produced by Michael Balcon Productions and Bryanston Films. The film had a difficult production period; Robinson suffered a heart attack and some cast members were bitten by snakes. It was first broadcast on British television on BBC2 on Christmas Day 1970 and on American television by the American Broadcasting Company (ABC) in 1971.

== Plot ==
Ten-year-old English boy Sammy Hartland lives in Port Said, Egypt, with his parents. When they are killed in a bombing during the Suez Crisis, the boy flees the city in the ensuing panic. He sets out to reach his only living relative, an aunt who lives 5,000 miles to the south in Durban, South Africa - at the other end of the continent and in a different hemisphere. Along his journey Sammy encounters a colourful array of characters. His first "guide" is an Arab peddler who dies in a freak accident.

Sammy is then rescued by wealthy tourist Gloria van Imhoff. When she wants to return him to Port Said, Sammy runs off and encounters a gruff old hunter/diamond smuggler, Cocky Wainwright, whose life is subsequently saved by the boy. When the police search for Sammy, they arrest the old man, who has been a fugitive for years. After Sammy is finally united with his Aunt Jane, he learns that the old smuggler left him his entire fortune.

== Cast ==
- Edward G. Robinson - Cocky Wainwright
- Fergus McClelland - Sammy Hartland
- Constance Cummings - Gloria van Imhoff
- Harry H. Corbett - Lem
- Paul Stassino - Spyros Dracandopolous
- Zia Mohyeddin - the Syrian
- Orlando Martins - Abu Lubaba
- John Turner - Heneker
- Zena Walker - Aunt Jane
- Jack Gwillim - District Commissioner
- Patricia Donahue - Kathy
- Jared Allen - Bob
- Guy Deghy - Doctor
- Marne Maitland - Hassan (scenes cut from finished film).
- Steven Scott - Egyptian Policeman

== Production ==
=== Development ===
The film was based on a 1961 novel by W.H. Canaway.

Film rights were purchased by Bryanston Films, a company run by Michael Balcon. He hired Alexander Mackendrick to direct (the two men had worked together at Ealing). Mackendrick had not made a film since The Sweet Smell of Success.

The film had a budget of £385,000 with £269,500 being provided by Bryanston-Seven Arts, partnership between Bryanston and Seven Arts. There was additional investment from Enterprises (a South African company) and the US arm of Seven Arts of £57,750 each. Bryanston Seven Arts intended to make three films: Sammy Going South, The World of Sammy Lee and Tom Jones. It wound up only making the first two.

=== Casting ===
Fergus McClelland was an eleven years old pupil at Holland Park Comprehensive School in London in March 1962 when he was chosen from hundreds of other boys to play Sammy. According to the actor Donald Sinden, (who had worked for the film's executive producer Sir Michael Balcon at Ealing Studios when he made The Cruel Sea) his youngest son, Marc Sinden, then aged eight, was originally offered the part of Sammy, but he turned the offer down on his son's behalf as "only a handful of child actors ever make it as adult actors and if Marc wants to be an actor, he should wait until he is old enough to make the decision himself."

Alexander Mackendrick thought that Fergus was perfect for the role. "He was a lean, hard, little boy. Tough as old nails...a really strong character", said Mackendrick. "He had the hunted look of an abused child, which in some ways he was. He came from a disturbed home; his parents were getting divorced and there were problems. So he was the perfect casting. But when he went out to Africa, he started having the time of his life. The unit adored him and, to my dismay, started to feed him...he put on weight and there was no way I could stop it. So, instead of this hunted and abused child, who’s supposed to be starving and neurotic, you had a sturdy, stocky, well fed little character. A good actor, but the physique betrayed itself." In an interview on the DVD release of the film McClelland believed he won the role when he was seen insisting on combing his own hair that the casting director thought was self-reliance in character with Sammy.

=== Shooting ===
Filming began in Africa in May 1962 in CinemaScope and Eastman Colour and finished at Shepperton Studios in England in November of that year (Fergus McClelland celebrated his 12th birthday on the set in September 1962). For political reasons filming could not be done in Port Said, Egypt, so Mombasa in Kenya stood in for the scenes set at the height of the Suez Crisis of 1956 and the air attack on Port Said. Some long shots were done clandestinely by a second unit in Egypt, with an Arab boy dressed as Sammy, and the negative was later smuggled out of the country.

The making of the film was very troubled. Executive producer Sir Michael Balcon saw the story as a warm tale of an innocent 10-year-old boy’s triumph over adversity, set against the scenery of the African continent which would be shown to best advantage by CinemaScope and Eastman Colour. The film’s director, Alexander Mackendrick, had an entirely different understanding of the story, which was altogether darker. He saw it as "the inward odyssey of a deeply disturbed child, who destroys everybody he comes up against". Mackendrick tried his best to compromise with these two contrasting interpretations, which arguably detracted from the overall focus of the film. Balcon deleted key scenes vital to the narrative, which undermined the film considerably. Despite the cutting of these scenes, something of the seriousness and realism that Mackendrick strived to put on film still came through.

=== Post Production ===
Originally the finished film came in at over three hours and two film editors were brought in by Balcon to trim it considerably to a more manageable 129 minutes, removing, among other scenes, shots of the Syrian peddler lusting after Sammy (oddly enough, a small part of these censored scenes apparently made it to the release version and can be seen on the present DVD). When submitted to the British Board of Film Censors in February 1963, they ordered additional cuts (the sounds of a man screaming) before they would grant the film the "U" certificate that the producers were after.

== Premiere ==
The film was chosen for the Royal Film Performance of 1963 and premiered at the Odeon, Leicester Square, London, attended by Queen Elizabeth, the Queen Mother on Monday 18 March 1963. It went on nationwide release in April. Shortly afterwards it was trimmed of a further nine minutes. This shortened version was the one used for its first showing on British television in 1970 and all subsequent television showings in the United Kingdom.

In 2010, when Optimum Releasing wanted to release the film on DVD in the UK, they made a thorough search for the original 128-minute version, without success. Not even the British Film Institute had one. Optimum released the 119-minute version, running 114 minutes at PAL running speed, instead. The original version is now believed lost.

== US Release ==
When the film was released in the United States it was retitled A Boy Ten Feet Tall and was cut by 40 minutes so that it would fit on a double bill. Tristram Cary's score was also replaced by another score composed by Les Baxter. Regarding the American distributors changing the title of the film, Fergus McClelland claimed in a BBC Radio interview recorded in June 2010: "They were very worried that white Americans would think it was about a black boy called Sammy and wouldn't go to see the film."

== Reception ==
=== Critical ===
Released theatrically in the United States as the headliner of a double bill with Crack in the World, Sammy Going South was reviewed by Howard Thompson for The New York Times. He commented: "... "Boy" is above average, in detailing the 2,000-mile trek of a war orphan during the Suez crisis in 1956, from Port Said to Durban, South Africa. The picture aims to convey the emotional growth of the battered youngster, played by 10-year-old Fergus McClelland, in his encounters with toughening, adult relationships. Most fortunately indeed, at about midpoint, that wonderful old actor Edward G. Robinson saunters into view as a grizzled, warm-hearted diamond smuggler, and gives the picture its real substance."

=== Awards ===
Nominated for a BAFTA Film Award for best British cinematography in 1964, Sammy Going South was also entered into the 3rd Moscow International Film Festival.

=== Box office ===
The film was a box office disappointment.
