= Eliot Hyman =

American film producer (1904–1980)

- Born: 1904; New York City, U.S.
- Died: July 23, 1980 (aged 75); Westport, Connecticut
- Occupation: Film executive

Eliot Hyman (1904 – July 23, 1980) was an American film executive who was a major investor and syndicator of theatrical films for television. He is perhaps best known as the guiding force behind the successful Associated Artists Productions. He later co-founded Seven Arts Productions.

== Biography ==
Hyman was born and raised in New York City, and worked in the family business of wholesale automobile tires. In 1934, he partnered with a friend to deal in microfilm, and the advent of World War II increased their business and revenue. In 1946, as an investment, he bought eight old movie westerns for $1,500 apiece -- and sold them three days later to the new WPIX TV station in New York -- for $11,125 apiece. This launched Hyman's career as a successful investor.

Hyman solicited financial backers and incorporated in 1947 as Telinvest, a company actively buying TV rights to old movies. This was before commercial television took hold, and Hyman shrewdly made deals with independent producers who had dozens of old negatives that had exhausted their earning potential in theaters. Hyman explained the relatively low prices of old films as merchandise at this time: "No one really understood what television was all about. They thought it was simply going to be an extension of radio." Author Scott MacGillivray explains that feature films did not yet fit into the sponsorship schedule established in radio: "Pioneer television broadcasts generally ran 15 or 30 minutes each, and anything that ran longer was usually serialized over several days."

Eliot Hyman had launched his own syndication firm, Associated Artists Productions (a.a.p.), in early 1950, drawing from his holdings of films produced by Monogram Pictures and Eagle-Lion Films between 1938 and 1946. Hyman continued to acquire old pictures until he amassed an extensive library of more than 500 titles. Then he sold them all to Motion Pictures for Television (MPTV), an early TV syndicator established by former movie executive Matty Fox, securing Hyman a lucrative post as company officer. Hyman repaid his Telinvest backers and sold his interest in that corporation for $1,250,000. On the heels of these transactions, in August 1951, Steve Broidy, president of Monogram, offered Hyman a package of 199 feature films for $1,250 apiece. Hyman bought the films, which went on to earn between $12,000,000 and $15,000,000, by Hyman's estimate.

Hyman and Fox engineered numerous deals. For example, 12 Sherlock Holmes mysteries starring Basil Rathbone and Nigel Bruce were acquired from Universal by James Mulvey, president of Samuel Goldwyn Productions. Mulvey sold them to Fox, who resold them to Hyman.

Film producer Kenneth Hyman was his son.

== Associated Artists Productions ==
To this point Hyman had been dealing with independent producers and minor studios disposing of older backlogs. In July 1956, Hyman revitalized his a.a.p. company by making his first big deal with a major studio. He bought the Warner Bros. backlog of 750 features, 1,500 shorts, and 337 cartoons for $21,000,000. The purchase paid immediate dividends, as dozens of TV stations signed up with a.a.p. In a.a.p.'s first seven months alone, Hyman secured sales contracts worth $13,600,000.

Hyman also bought the Fleischer Studios/Famous Studios Popeye cartoons from Paramount Pictures. He also began investing in films, including two major productions of director John Huston, Moulin Rouge (1953) and Moby Dick (1956). He helped arrange the financing of the first horror film from Hammer Film Productions, The Curse of Frankenstein (1957).

In 1958, Hyman sold Associated Artists Productions to United Artists and became president of United Artists Associated, for whom he bought the screen rights to several successful theatrical properties, e.g. plays and musicals, that became major films, including "West Side Story", "The World of Suzie Wong", and "Two for the Seesaw". He also produced other motion pictures for theatrical exhibition through other companies that he formed.

In 1960, Hyman went on his own again to form Seven Arts Productions and engaged in worldwide distribution of feature films for television. At the same time Seven Arts directly financed and produced a number of films, including Lolita (1962), What Ever Happened to Baby Jane? (1962), and Seven Days in May (1964). He also guided Seven Arts into stage production, including Broadway presentations of "The Night of the Iguana", "Funny Girl", "The Owl and the Pussycat" and several other shows.

From November 1966 to July 1967, Seven Arts and Warner Bros. were merged, and the company became Warner Bros.-Seven Arts. Hyman was the chairman of Warner Bros.-Seven Arts from 1967 to 1969.

In 1969, Warner Bros.-Seven Arts was sold to Kinney National Company which dropped the Seven Arts name. Hyman retired from the company and became a private investor.
