= List of Father Brown episodes =

TV series

Father Brown is a British television detective period drama that has been broadcast on BBC One since 14 January 2013. It stars Mark Williams as the eponymous crime-solving Roman Catholic priest. The series is loosely based on short stories by G. K. Chesterton. As of 9 January 2026, 140 episodes of Father Brown have aired, currently in its thirteenth series.

== Series overview ==
Series	Episodes	Originally released	
Series	Episodes	First released	Last released
1	10	14 January 2013	25 January 2013
2	10	6 January 2014	17 January 2014
3	15	5 January 2015	23 January 2015
4	10	4 January 2016	15 January 2016
5	15	23 December 2016	19 January 2017
6	10	18 December 2017	12 January 2018
7	10	7 January 2019	18 January 2019
8	10	6 January 2020	17 January 2020
9	10	3 January 2022	14 January 2022
10	10	6 January 2023	10 March 2023
11	10	5 January 2024	8 March 2024
12	10	10 January 2025	14 March 2025
13	10	9 January 2026	27 March 2026

== Episodes ==
=== Series 1 (2013) ===
No. overall	No. in series	Title	Directed by	Written by	Original release date
1	1	"The Hammer of God"	Ian Barber	Tahsin Güner	14 January 2013
The brother of an Anglican vicar is killed with a blacksmith's hammer. When the blacksmith's wife confesses to the murder, Father Brown is convinced she is lying. With little time to save her, the priest must work hard to deduce who among the victim's enemies was truly responsible for the crime.
2	2	"The Flying Stars"	Ian Barber	Rachel Flowerday	15 January 2013
The wife of Colonel Adams is found drowned while wearing her ornate necklace, known as the Flying Stars. The necklace is bequeathed to her daughter, but it is then stolen from the family home while the occupants are performing a play. Father Brown investigates the death and the theft, and his suspicions are aroused by the discovery of an Italian coin.
3	3	"The Wrong Shape"	Dominic Keavey	Nicola Wilson	16 January 2013
Leonard Quinton, a former doctor turned poet living with his estranged wife, a young mistress, and an Indian guru manservant, is told by the guru that he will die that day. Before a poetry recital at his home, Quinton asks Father Brown to look after his wife if something happens to him. Quinton is found dead later that day, after apparently hanging himself, but Father Brown and Inspector Valentine suspect murder. A poisoned cat and the unmarked headstone of a baby buried in the garden, along with a German drug for morning sickness treatment that Quinton gave to his wife the previous year, provide the tragic answer.
4	4	"The Man in the Tree"	Dominic Keavey	Rebecca Wojciechowski	17 January 2013
While Father Brown is at the train station to meet a visiting German priest, Lady Felicia discovers a man in a tree, who is badly injured. The man had been stripped of his belongings, and Brown surmises that he was pushed from a train crossing a viaduct nearby. The injured man is taken to the hospital but remains unconscious, with his identity unknown. The police eventually suspect Sid Carter of robbing the man, but Brown sets out to prove his innocence.
5	5	"The Eye of Apollo"	Matt Carter	Tahsin Güner	18 January 2013
The cult known as the Church of Apollo comes to Kembleford, led by its charismatic leader Kalon. Shortly after their arrival, jealously emerges amongst its followers before Kalon's wife is found murdered. Brown is convinced someone found a way of reaching her within her locked room, and works to discover the culprit while finding a way to prevent Susie leaving with Kalon thanks to his charms. Michael Maloney would later reprise his role of Kalon, in series 9 episode 4 "The Children of Kalon".
6	6	"The Bride of Christ"	Ian Barber	Jude Tindall	21 January 2013
Father Brown is shocked when a nun dies before him, and discovers her death was due to cyanide poisoning. When a second nun dies in the same manner, suspicions are placed on the victims' convent, especially when it transpires the nuns there are holding on to bottles of cyanide. First appearance of Lorna Watson as Sister Boniface.
7	7	"The Devil's Dust"	Dominic Keavey	Dan Muirden	22 January 2013
A 14-year-old Ruth Bennett is ostracised by Kembleford's villagers for a skin complaint believed to be caused by her father's work. When she goes missing and her blood-stained pyjamas are found in the search for her, Father Brown determines to discover what happened, and has plenty of suspects with links to the missing girl.
8	8	"The Face of Death"	Matt Carter	Lol Fletcher	23 January 2013
When Lady Margaret runs a man down in a road accident, the victim's son blames her for deliberately killing them. At a masked charity garden party, an attempt is made on Margaret that leads to the death of another guest wearing an identical mask to her husband's. When she is eventually murdered afterwards, Father Brown investigates the matter, after the police's prime suspect disappears.
9	9	"The Mayor and the Magician"	Dominic Keavey	Nicola Wilson	24 January 2013
At the Kembleford's annual village fête, the obnoxious mayor William Knight is electrocuted at the microphone while making a speech. Father Brown investigates when the mayor's wife is arrested for murder, and receives a surprising clue from the confessional. Meanwhile, Mrs. McCarthy is shocked when her deceased husband turns up dressed as a magician.
10	10	"The Blue Cross"	Ian Barber	Paul Matthew Thompson	25 January 2013
Father Brown receives a warning from the international thief, Hercule Flambeau, that he intends to steal a priceless relic, the Blue Cross. Brown enters a battle of wits to prevent the theft, and in the process discovers there is a deep connection between himself and Flambeau, linked with the Great War. First appearance of John Light as Hercule Flambeau.

=== Series 2 (2014) ===
No. overall	No. in series	Title	Directed by	Written by	Original release date
11	1	"The Ghost in the Machine"	Matt Carter	Rachel Flowerday	6 January 2014
Father Brown investigates the disappearance of a parishioner, Charlotte McKinley, who believed she was being haunted by her sister who had disappeared nine years previously. Husband Victor (Andrew Havill), a struck-off doctor, is arrested as being responsible for the murder of both women. Final regular appearance of Hugo Speer as Inspector Valentine. First appearance of Tom Chambers as Inspector Sullivan.
12	2	"The Maddest of All"	Matt Carter	Tahsin Güner	7 January 2014
Ex-serviceman Felix Underwood, a mental patient at the Danvers Retreat, dies suddenly in the street. Events take an unusual turn when he returns to life two days later at his church committal. Father Brown assists Inspector Sullivan to discover the reason for the resurrection, and gets himself committed at Danvers to covertly investigate the premises. Dr Henshaw is played by Adrian Rawlins, who had previously appeared alongside Mark Williams in the Harry Potter film series as Harry’s father, James Potter.
13	3	"The Pride of the Prydes"	Paul Gibson	Jude Tindall	8 January 2014
The opening to the public of Pryde Castle, an estate mired in death duties, ends when guide Audrey Diggle (Marcia Warren), is struck and killed by an arrow. She was an expert on the Pryde's family history, including an old curse that the first born would be mad. When a page from the parish birth records goes missing, Father Brown is convinced that the motive lies in the Pryde family's past. All the family members are known to use a longbow.
14	4	"The Shadow of the Scaffold"	Paul Gibson	Rachel Flowerday	9 January 2014
Violet Fernsley (Emma Stansfield) – convicted of killing her pig-farmer husband, whose body has never been found – is given a temporary reprieve from the gallows when she claims she is pregnant. The pregnancy test gives Father Brown three days to find the real killer. When her husband's finger turns up in a pig's stomach, it points to a serial killer amongst the family. Father Brown's investigation concludes God's law is above man's law. First appearance of John Burton as Sergeant Goodfellow.
15	5	"The Mysteries of the Rosary"	Ian Barber	Paul Matthew Thompson	10 January 2014
The Lannington Rosary, missing for 500 years, is a relic blessed with healing powers. Professor Hilary Ambrose (James Laurenson) sends an ancient prayer book containing a clue to its whereabouts to his old friend Father Brown, before he goes missing and his home is ransacked. Father Brown receives unexpected help from the untrustworthy Flambeau, returned from the dead. A terminally ill fellow priest, Father Ignatius (Anton Lesser), also desperately seeks the rosary to heal both himself and others. Second appearance of John Light as Hercule Flambeau.
16	6	"The Daughters of Jerusalem"	Matt Carter	Jude Tindall	13 January 2014
Father Brown is laid up in his attic bedroom with a broken leg, and young Father Roland Eager is acting as his locum. His film of African orphans being shown at the Kembleford Women's Institute is switched for a pornographic film. In the following days, two members of the Institute are murdered, one poisoned and one stabbed with a hat pin. Inspector Sullivan arrests Dianah Fortescue, whose husband was arrested earlier in a Soho pornographic cinema. Father Brown investigates with the help of Mrs. McCarthy, Lady Felicia, Sid Carter, and a telescope.
17	7	"The Three Tools of Death"	Paul Gibson	Lol Fletcher	14 January 2014
Alice Armstrong has been treated by electroshock therapy for memory loss and depression after she accidentally killed her mother. When her father is murdered and a rope, gun, and knife are left behind, Magnus the chauffeur is suspected together with Peter, Armstrong's secretary, whom Alice loves. The truth of a father in debt leads Father Brown to another conclusion about the deaths.
18	8	"The Prize of Colonel Gerard"	Ian Barber	Dominique Moloney	15 January 2014
Edward Gerard, a former prisoner of war who returns from North Korea suffering with nightmares and sympathetic to his captors, greatly displeases his martinet uncle, Colonel Cecil Gerard (Nicholas Jones), who threatens to commit him to an asylum. When the Colonel is murdered, the suspects include Edward, the Colonel's daughter (an adopted Chinese girl) who was going to run away with Edward, the brother-in-law, and Edward's mother, who married the colonel after the death of Edward's father. Father Brown finds the solution lies in the family history and the Colonel's sexual intentions toward his adopted daughter. Jai-Li Gerard was portrayed by Katie Leung. She had starred with Mark Williams in the Harry Potter film series.
19	9	"The Grim Reaper"	Matt Carter	David Semple	16 January 2014
Obnoxious farmer John Tatton has an equally obnoxious son, Alfred, who has been harassing Oona, the young wife of Dr. Crawford (James Fleet). Alfred told his father that he was having an affair with Oona, and when Alfred is killed in a threshing machine, poison pen letters appear accusing the doctor of his murder. Only Mrs. McCarthy knows that Oona is pregnant.
20	10	"The Laws of Motion"	Paul Gibson	Tahsin Güner	17 January 2014
Audrey MacMurray (Tracy-Ann Oberman) is a ruthless businesswoman with many enemies. While racing her car at a local hill climb track, she is killed when her brake line has been cut. Father Brown's investigation infuriates Inspector Sullivan, who already has his own suspect in custody, and the Inspector arrests Father Brown for a breach of the peace to put an end to his amateur sleuthing. While in jail however, Father Brown receives more information that makes him believe that he is right and, with Sid and Mrs. McCarthy, he escapes to convince the guilty party to do the right thing.

=== Series 3 (2015) ===
No. overall	No. in series	Title	Directed by	Written by	Original release date
21	1	"The Man in the Shadows"	Paul Gibson	Rob Kinsman	5 January 2015
Sid stumbles across someone preparing to put a dead man into a river, but Inspector Sullivan covers up the death as an accident. Sid is arrested when he and Father Brown investigate mysterious activities at a local stately home, and Lady Felicia is blackmailed by MI5 spymaster Daniel Whittaker looking for a Soviet agent who has infiltrated a secret intelligence base there. Daniel Flynn would later reprise his role of Daniel Whittaker, in series 6 episode 5 "The Face of the Enemy".
22	2	"The Curse of Amenhotep"	Matt Carter	Jude Tindall	6 January 2015
When the young wife of Sir Raleigh Beresford dies mysteriously after touching the sarcophagus of Amenhotep – an Egyptian mummy Beresford had brought back from his excavations some 26 years earlier, during which his first wife was killed in a rock fall – a deadly curse is suspected.
23	3	"The Invisible Man"	Matt Carter	Tahsin Güner	7 January 2015
The circus returns to Kembleford, and local waitress Laura is held to her promise – given in jest the previous year – to marry the clown or the hypnotist. The clown is murdered; in his dying breath he names the hypnotist. Laura's boyfriend, the clown's girlfriend, and another clown are all suspected. Laura's willingness to marry the hypnotist puzzles Father Brown, even though he agrees to marry the couple.
24	4	"The Sign of the Broken Sword"	Ian Barber	Stephen McAteer	8 January 2015
A major is murdered on an army base by a legendary broken sword during commemoration of the men killed during the evacuation of Dunkirk. The sword belonged to the regiment's colonel, who used the sword to charge an enemy position with his men. Father Brown has to uncover the secret of two murders being kept to uphold the honour of the regiment. Loosely based on the 1911 story of the same title.
25	5	"The Last Man"	John Greening	Jude Tindall	9 January 2015
The arrest of the new cricket captain of Kembleford's cricket team for the murder of the team's fast bowler, a suicide the year before in the cricket pavilion, and a match against a rival village to determine the ownership of the cricket ground finds Father Brown consoling the victim's mother, solving a murder involving blackmail, playing cricket, and watching Lady Felicia as the "last man" of the innings.
26	6	"The Upcott Fraternity"	Paul Gibson	Paul Matthew Thompson	12 January 2015
Father Brown is visiting his old Rector (Dudley Sutton) at Upcott Seminary for trainee priests when a student commits suicide, Father Brown attempts to find the truth behind his death and that of a student a year earlier, both members of a secret fraternity that has closed ranks. Father Brown enlists Sid to go undercover as a trainee priest despite Mrs. McCarthy's misgivings.
27	7	"The Kembleford Boggart"	John Greening	Jonathan Neil	13 January 2015
The domineering father (Simon Williams) of a successful young writer, 22-year-old Hannah, is murdered in a locked room and the only suspect is an itinerant traveller who comes to Kembleford every year in a caravan with his mother. Father Brown's suspicions are aroused when the murder has the hallmarks of a boggart, an unwelcome infant from another world created by Hannah in her book.
28	8	"The Lair of the Libertines"	Matt Carter	Lol Fletcher	14 January 2015
Father Brown, Mrs. McCarthy, and Lady Felicia find themselves stranded at a hotel hired by Madame Chania (Ronni Ancona) and her guests, international playboys, seeking hedonistic pleasures. When a local prostitute is found murdered in the grounds and two of the guests are killed, Father Brown realises they are in the lair of a hunter intent on killing them all.
29	9	"The Truth in the Wine"	Ian Barber	Kit Lambert	15 January 2015
A dead dog in a vat of wine precedes the shooting to death of an itinerant labourer and theft of wages from the safe in the study of Colonel Anthony Forbes-Leith, owner of a failing winery. Father Brown discovers none of the suspects are who they pretend to be.
30	10	"The Judgement of Man"	Ian Barber	Paul Matthew Thompson	16 January 2015
An exhibition of valuable art at the Belvedere Museum includes a priceless artwork on loan from the Vatican. Father Brown spots his nemesis Hercule Flambeau and accurately suspects he plans to steal the painting. Flambeau is shocked to encounter a woman from his past he thought dead. She is seeking to avenge the death of her parents by killing the curator, who had helped the Nazis loot paintings from Jewish families. Third appearance of John Light as Hercule Flambeau.
31	11	"The Time Machine"	Ian Barber	Tahsin Güner	19 January 2015
Lady Felicia involves Father Brown with Jacob Francis, a young quantum physicist, who claims to have built a time machine so he can go back in time to prove his father was murdered in his locked laboratory by one of his family. After Francis appears to prove his machine works, he is murdered in the same laboratory, leaving Father Brown's only option to use the machine and see who killed the father and son.
32	12	"The Standing Stones"	Matt Carter	Rachel Flowerday	20 January 2015
Father Brown and Mrs. McCarthy visit the cottage hospital in the village of Standing where many of the children have been struck down by an outbreak of polio. When a local barmaid is found murdered at the local stone circle, her best friend Ginnie is arrested for her murder, after it is discovered that they had fallen out over Ginnie blaming her for her son contracting polio. Unfortunately, the supposed murder weapon that is hoped will clear her only seems to strengthen the case against her. Then a local mystic makes a connection between the death and a legend about sacrificing an innocent at the stones – and someone tries to kill Ginnie and make it look like suicide.
33	13	"The Paradise of Thieves"	Diana Patrick	Rob Kinsman	21 January 2015
Father Brown and Mrs. McCarthy are at the local bank when armed robbers burst in and insist Father Brown accompany then as they force the manager to open the locked vault. The robbers flee when the vault is opened and the manager's son-in-law is discovered dead inside. As the only key-holder, the manager is arrested by Inspector Sullivan. Father Brown finds that the manager has been embezzling funds to finance a seedy nightclub owned by his son-in-law, but he needs Sid's help to break into the vault to discover how the murder was committed.
34	14	"The Deadly Seal"	Diana Patrick	Dan Muirden	22 January 2015
While hearing confession, Father Brown hears a penitent declare that Bishop Talbot will be shot and killed the next day. Knowing the Bishop is attending a shooting party organised by a theatrical producer but unable to reveal what he heard, Father Brown also attends the shoot. Although the Bishop is saved, his assistant, Albert Davies, is killed instead. Father Brown discovers a deadly pact between a child abuse victim and the murdered man's wife to kill Davies and another man while providing each other with unbreakable alibis.
35	15	"The Owl of Minerva"	Matt Carter	Jude Tindall	23 January 2015
A body of a journalist about to expose an offshoot of the Freemasons, The Illuminati, is found in the woods. Inspector Sullivan's investigations find him on the run for killing a fellow detective and seeking sanctuary in the confessional at St Mary's. Father Brown – with the aid of Mrs. McCarthy, Lady Felicia, and Sid – rallies round to try to prove his innocence and protect him from a deadly organisation with members highly placed in the community. Final regular appearance of Tom Chambers as Inspector Sullivan.

=== Series 4 (2016) ===
No. overall	No. in series	Title	Directed by	Written by	Original release date
36	1	"The Mask of the Demon"	Paul Gibson	Jude Tindall	4 January 2016
Lady Felicia knows the Hollywood star Rex Bishop who is in Kembleford filming a "B" movie The Brides of the Demon. He invites Father Brown and Mrs. McCarthy, who is a fan of his, to view the filming. Tensions are evident among the film's participants – the director, his actress wife, a starlet, Rex Bishop, and the writer. The director is found dead wearing a demon's mask, and Inspector Mallory does not appreciate Father Brown's help. First appearance of Jack Deam as Inspector Mallory. Filming took place at Coughton Court.
37	2	"The Brewer's Daughter"	Paul Gibson	Kit Lambert	5 January 2016
Sid falls for Grace Fitzgerald, the married heiress to a brewery, and is her alibi when Mallory arrests her for murdering her father in a fire. Refusing to use Sid as an alibi, Grace asks Father Brown to search for the real killer, and he uncovers evidence that her husband and her stepsister killed the father. The suicide by another lover of Grace's and the note he left complicate the issue, as he had been sacked by her husband when he caught them kissing.
38	3	"The Hangman's Demise"	David Beauchamp	Dan Muirden	6 January 2016
A former hangman, Henry Lee, is confronted at his wedding anniversary by a mother about her son whom he executed a year before for the murder of a court secretary – an execution where the condemned man whispered to Lee the identity of the real killer. The following morning Lee is poisoned with hemlock. His friend George, an ex-policeman, is arrested and released. The mother, recently released from prison, is arrested, and a motive for Lee's wife emerges. Father Brown untangles a web of deceit and corruption in the police as Lee lies dying.
39	4	"The Crackpot of the Empire"	David Beauchamp	Lol Fletcher	7 January 2016
Father Brown is apprehensive when he receives an invitation to a party given by the recently-released Uncle Mirth, a former music hall comedian whom Father Brown helped put in an asylum. When Father Brown and the other invitees arrive at the venue, a derelict warehouse, he and Mirth's brother find envelopes containing their death certificates. Inspector Mallory finds another death certificate for a second brother who had died of a heart attack outside the presbytery the previous day.
40	5	"The Daughter of Autolycus"	Paul Gibson	Jude Tindall	8 January 2016
Father Brown knows the Pope's coronation gift to the Queen of a priceless cross is too tempting to Flambeau and convinces the Bishop to let him guard it. Flambeau arrives on Father Brown's doorstep seeking his help to steal the cross in order to save the life of his daughter, whom he has never met. She has been kidnapped by Flambeau's former partner, whom he once left for dead. Before they can steal the cross, it goes missing from the Bishop's Palace. Father Brown has underestimated Papal politics, Flambeau's daughter, and the consciences of men. Fourth appearance of John Light as Hercule Flambeau.
41	6	"The Rod of Asclepius"	David Beauchamp	Jude Tindall	11 January 2016
Lady Felicia's reckless driving lands her and Mrs. McCarthy in adjoining hospital beds. A new admission to the ward dies the following morning on the operating table. A nurse claims it is murder and is found dead the same afternoon, forcing Inspector Mallory to do more than his initial cursory investigation. Once Sid makes it past the officious substitute parish secretary and notifies him of developments, Father Brown follows a different line of inquiry. Lady Felicia and Mrs. McCarthy's snooping put the latter in danger on the same operating table.
42	7	"The Missing Man"	David Beauchamp	Rachel Flowerday	12 January 2016
A pilot returns from the dead after eight years as Father Brown is about to marry his wife to his brother. No one except his daughter and the family's dog is pleased to see him, especially his father who believes him to be a deserter. When the returnee is found shot in the head and blood-stained women's clothing is found, Inspector Mallory charges the wife, dismissing the daughter's claims that another woman entered the house. Father Brown finds a visiting card for a cross-dressing bar, realises the identity of the real killer, and decides the culprit cannot be exposed.
43	8	"The Resurrectionists"	James Larkin	Rob Kinsman	13 January 2016
Father Brown is puzzled when the grave of a recent burial is opened and the body is removed, only for it to turn up at the premises of a different undertaker. Inspector Mallory is even more mystified as the victim was known to die of decapitation in a motorcycle accident, but there's no sign of such an injury now. The undertaker is arrested, and the animosity between him and the victim's mother is evident for all to see. Father Brown uncovers the reason behind their hatred and the forbidden love which the victim had for the undertaker's daughter.
44	9	"The Sins of the Father"	Paul Gibson	Al Smith	14 January 2016
Robert Twyman, a leading aeronautics magnate, receives a note that his son, a pianist and contestant in a local variety show, would be killed if he does not confess. Next morning the son is found strangled next to his piano in a locked house with only his father and butler present. Twyman is convinced a rival pianist and journalist is his son's killer. Inspector Mallory arrests Twyman after Lady Felicia finds him standing over the journalist's dead body by her piano. Father Brown notices that both pianists had been playing the same piece of music and finds the answer in a book given to him by Doctor Mordaunt Jackson, a psychoanalyst currently lecturing in Kembleford.
45	10	"The Wrath of Baron Samdi"	James Larkin	Tahsin Güner	15 January 2016
Baron Samdi is the voodoo spirit of the dead that Emmanuel Jannite invokes when he follows his love, Yveline Lafond, from Haiti to Kembleford. Lafond is working as lead singer in a jazz band. The band leader, also in love with Lafond, is found dead in a swimming pool, poisoned, and Jannite is killed in an accident following a police chase. Inspector Mallory believes the case closed, but Father Brown's snooping uncovers the real killer. As he confronts the culprit, Father Brown collapses after being informed that he has already been poisoned. Final regular appearance of Alex Price as Sid Carter until the Series 9 opener "The Menace of Mephistopheles" (2022).

=== Series 5 (2016–17) ===
No. overall	No. in series	Title	Directed by	Written by	Original release date
46	1	"The Star of Jacob"	Paul Gibson	Jude Tindall	23 December 2016
The Duke of Frome, John Langton – with his wife, their baby born after complications during childbirth, a domineering nanny, nursery maid, and valet – arrive at Montague Hall for Lady Felicia's Yuletide ball. During the evening, the baby is taken from his cot. Inspector Mallory suspects an inside job by the valet when his secret wife arrives, while Father Brown is more interested in the fact that the baby was born at a home for unmarried mothers. Mrs. McCarthy, under pressure from the diocese to provide a Christmas service fit for a Duke, receives unexpected help from Michael Negal, a vagrant she finds sleeping in the confessional.
47	2	"The Labyrinth of the Minotaur"	Paul Gibson	Jude Tindall	2 January 2017
Self-indulgent Robert Malmort and studious Joan Vanderlande are brought together by their parents – Lady Davina Malmont and millionaire Norman Vanderlande – with a view to marriage. When the Malmont maid Ruby is found dead, Lady Felicia's niece Bunty is suspected. Father Brown suspects the answer lies at the end of an underground maze, and a sad secret the Malmorts are hiding is revealed. Following her latest scandal, Bunty's father insists she stay in Kembleford, and Lady Felicia needs her to look after her home as she is leaving with her husband, Monty, who has been appointed Governor of Northern Rhodesia. Final regular appearance of Nancy Carroll as Lady Felicia Montague. First appearance of Emer Kenny as Penelope (Bunty) Windermere.
48	3	"The Eve of St John"	Gary Williams	Jude Tindall	3 January 2017
Kembleford District Council holds an emergency meeting of the local clergy to discuss a coven in Crow's Wood. Father Brown's liberal views on witchcraft do not go down well, and when the dead body of a coven member in the woods is found, feelings run high in the village. Tensions are fanned by the Reverend Gillespie, a Methodist minister whose wife and daughter died in the Blitz. Father Brown invites the warlock, Eugene Bone; his partner, Selina Crow; and new initiate, Dione Moon, to dinner. But an unexpected addition to Mrs. McCarthy's mushroom soup recipe puts the priest's outreach efforts in jeopardy.
49	4	"The Chedworth Cyclone"	Paul Gibson	Paul Matthew Thompson	4 January 2017
Roy Tomkins, a washed-up boxer and rival of Jed Cornish, the 'Chedworth Cyclone', is found dead at the gym. Father Brown is drawn into the shady world of London boxing promoter and racketeer Dennis Nelson, who is involved in illegal betting, fixed fights, and blackmail. Suspected of the murder, Jed is arrested and then released into the custody of Father Brown, who uncovers Jed's secret love for Nelson's girlfriend. She had lured a town councillor into a compromising position so Nelson can obtain a boxing venue. Father Brown has to uncover the murderer, ensure a fair fight, and break Nelson's hold over everyone.
50	5	"The Hand of Lucia"	Paul Gibson	Lol Fletcher	5 January 2017
Lucia Morell, the bankrupt writer of erotic novel Lulu and Lucia, is murdered with an axe and her hand removed; she had previously been the object of another attack. Her threat to reveal the person she based the character of Lulu on is thought to be the motive. Suspects include Lady Ursula Lansford of Uxbridge, who runs a home for released female prisoners; Lansford's son, who was humiliated by Lucia; the gardener, a former friar; and two ex-prisoners. Bunty becomes ill after eating the gardener's soup, and one of the girls is poisoned. When the hand is discovered in Lady Ursula's private bathroom, the gardener confesses. Father Brown believes the answer is in the novel and finds a clue leading to the real killer.
51	6	"The Eagle and the Daw"	Gary Williams	Kit Lambert	6 January 2017
Katherine Corven, awaiting execution for murdering her husband, summons Father Brown, who helped to convict her, to hear her confession. She tells him that she has arranged the death of her lover Raymond Worrall. When Inspector Mallory finds Worrall in a locked cottage dead from a gunshot to the head and Father Brown in possession of a pistol and the key to the cottage, he arrests him on suspicion of murder. Bunty and Mrs. McCarthy seek to prove his innocence, and Sergeant Goodfellow contrives his escape from the police station cell. A jackdaw egg at the cottage provides Father Brown with a clue to explain the death of Worrall. Kate O'Flynn would later reprise her role of Katherine Corven, in series 6 episode 2 "The Jackdaw's Revenge".
52	7	"The Smallest of Things"	Bob Thomson	Tahshin Güner	9 January 2017
Agnes Lesser creates aids to detection in the form of dioramas of crime scenes. She invites Father Brown to an awards ceremony at her home where she unveils an exact diorama of her mother's death, at the bottom of a staircase ten years previously, to the shocked guests including her father, the Chief Constable, and the detective who investigated at the time, hoping the death would be reinvestigated. When the detective is murdered after removing a miniature newspaper from the diorama, Inspector Mallory is arrested for his murder, and Father Brown realises the newspaper holds the clue to the tragic events that had befallen the Lesser family, including the death of Agnes' younger sister by drowning.
53	8	"The Crimson Feather"	Paul Gibson	Kit Lambert	10 January 2017
Mrs. McCarthy's goddaughter Joselyn visits and then disappears. A red feather leads Father Brown to a private gentlemen's club, The Crimson Feather. With Bunty's help, Father Brown discovers Joselyn is at the club, where she has been working for months. When one of the other girls, Verity, is murdered at the club wearing Joselyn's costume, both Bunty (as Pepper Seymore, a burlesque dancer) and Mrs. McCarthy (as a cleaner) take undercover jobs at the club looking for clues. Father Brown discovers Verity's pregnancy, jealousy, unrequited love, and blackmail, along with special services being offered within the club.
54	9	"The Lepidopterist's Companion"	Paul Gibson	Kit Lambert	11 January 2017
Mrs. McCarthy looks after Kembleford's Mobile Library when the manager, Margaret Cartwright, is discovered injured in the library van by her assistant Ada. Cartwright's husband Graham, a photographer, accidentally kills his assistant, Ada's boyfriend Lewis, with a cricket bat, believing him a burglar. Lewis is found to have been poisoned, and Father Brown discovers a cache of nude photographs of local girls, one whom is Ada. Inspector Mallory arrests Cartwright while Father Brown wonders why a book, The Lepidopterist's Companion, is loaned out so often for only a day or two and who used the studio where the pictures were taken.
55	10	"The Alchemist's Secret"	Simon Gibney	Rob Kinsman	12 January 2017
Professor Hilary Ambrose, who is experiencing memory loss and delusions, seeks the help of Father Brown to solve a riddle over 300 years old relating to an Alchemist who hid a formula believed to turn lead into gold. When one of his students is murdered and the evidence points to Ambrose, Inspector Mallory arrests him. To prove his innocence, Father Brown has to solve the riddle, find the hidden formula, and discover the real killer. Discovering the terrible secret of the formula and the killer poses a dilemma for Father Brown but explains why an entire village, Thorndike, disappeared from the map over 300 years ago.
56	11	"The Sins of Others"	Diana Patrick	Tahsin Güner	13 January 2017
Sid Carter is released from prison after a year following his conviction of assault (of which he was innocent) on Judith Miles, then a prostitute now working in a solicitor’s office. Accompanied by Father Brown but bent on revenge, Sid confronts his defence lawyer, Giles Foster, at the home of a Edward Reese, who recently appointed Foster a judge. When Foster is found dead, stabbed by a champagne glass to the throat, Sid is accused by Reese's son of the murder. Father Brown becomes a target of a paid assassin, and his only clue to the murder is a pail of ashes. First guest appearance of Alex Price as Sid Carter.
57	12	"The Theatre of the Invisible"	Bob Thomson	David Semple	16 January 2017
The radio quiz show Up to You comes to Kembleford, and Mrs. McCarthy and Bunty win an audition to become contestants. The cast's landlady is murdered by smoke from a blocked chimney, yet her three kittens survive. The three cast members and the new producer, who falls for and wants to impress Bunty, are suspected. Father Brown is concerned when Bunty invites the cast members to stay at Montague Hall. Bunty finds the show announcer's diary revealing his colourful lifestyle and his newfound prospects. When he is found dead in a locked bathroom, Father Brown realises Bunty and blackmail are the motives.
58	13	"The Tanganyika Green"	Simon Gibney	Catherine Skinner	17 January 2017
Aldous Kemp and his daughter Grace arrive in Kembleford for the County Fair to sell a valuable item so he can pay for her training as a doctor. Kemp was an employee of the East African Postal Service, which he had in common with John Hammond, whose father's business is failing. Bunty lodges antiques appraiser Wynford Collins at Montague Hall and is surprised when petrol is stolen from her car, while Mrs. McCarthy believes he's a fraud. When Kemp is murdered, Inspector Mallory arrests first the daughter, then John Hammond. Father Brown recognises John's skill as an engraver and that the Tanganyika Green is a rare stamp.
59	14	"The Fire in the Sky"	Diana Patrick	Kit Lambert	18 January 2017
Fear of alien invasion hits Kembleford as Charlotte, daughter of widower William Bayley, goes missing overnight and lights are seen in the sky. Charlotte arrives at the police station and collapses from injury and abdominal pains. The hospital doctor, a war hero, confirms she is pregnant. The next day William Bayley is found dead from poisoning, and Inspector Mallory arrests Sean Crimp, Charlotte's boyfriend who was recently dismissed as Bayley's gardener. More lights appear in the sky overnight, strange symbols appear around town, and Crimp disappears from his police cell. Father Brown finds the answer in a science fiction comic that the younger brother of Charlotte's hospital nurse is reading.
60	15	"The Penitent Man"	Paul Gibson	Tahsin Güner	19 January 2017
Hercule Flambeau, awaiting trial for murder, asks for Father Brown to act as his chaplain and professes his innocence. However, at his pre-trial hearing, he pleads guilty and is condemned to death. Father Brown realises he is part of Flambeau's plan to find a gold medallion hidden by the architect of the prison where he is being held. The plan begin to unravel when Flambeau's supposed victim fails to reappear, having been murdered by his wife, who is intent on obtaining the gold medallion for herself. Father Brown has to assist with Flambeau's escape from the condemned cell. Fifth appearance of John Light as Hercule Flambeau.

=== Series 6 (2017–18) ===
No. overall	No. in series	Title	Directed by	Written by	Original release date
61	1	"The Tree of Truth"	Paul Gibson	Jude Tindall	18 December 2017
A skeleton from a seven-year-old murder case is found buried in the woods, bringing doubts on the conviction of the confessed killer. Inspector Mallory and Father Brown reinvestigate the murder. Sid Carter brings letters for Father Brown and Bunty from Lady Felicia, as well as a Christmas present for Mrs. McCarthy. Father Brown, Mrs. McCarthy, and Bunty audition for the local amateur pantomime, Cinderella, but do not get the roles they expected. Sid is recruited to partner Father Brown, and Mallory and Sergeant Goodfellow get cast as the ugly stepsisters. When an accident happens during rehearsals, Father Brown realises the truth lies within the theatre. Second guest appearance of Alex Price as Sid Carter and voice-over cameo of Nancy Carroll as Lady Felicia.
62	2	"The Jackdaw's Revenge"	Gary Williams	Kit Lambert	2 January 2018
Katherine Corven, moments before being executed for murdering her husband, is reprieved on the confession of her housekeeper. Father Brown is afraid she will take revenge on his friends. A wardress from Corven's prison is found hanged in a locked cottage, and Corven's alibi is provided by the Mother Superior of a convent where she is training as a postulant. A local reporter pursues Father Brown, accusing him in the press of impropriety with Corven. Bunty goes missing, and Father Brown is blackmailed to confirm the story under the threat of Bunty's life. A jackdaw flying in the church gives Father Brown the clue to the death of the wardress. Kate O'Flynn reprises her role of Katherine Corven from series 5 episode 6 "The Eagle and the Daw".
63	3	"The Kembleford Dragon"	Christiana Ebohon-Green	David Semple	3 January 2018
British Railways proposes closing Kembleford Station due to non-profitability, causing its stationmaster, Ben Webb, to have a heart attack. At a fete to save the station, Webb's body is found in a trunk on the platform, apparently bludgeoned to death. Learning Webb was a philanderer over many years gives Father Brown many suspects – Webb's pregnant wife Julia, a bus company boss, a British Railways manager, and the church's new cleaner Pandora, who disappeared the day of Webb's murder. The murder is complicated when it is discovered that Webb died from drowning. This episode guest-stars Jessie Cave, another former Harry Potter co-star of Mark Williams.
64	4	"The Angel of Mercy"	Niall Fraser	Dan Muirden	4 January 2018
Mrs. McCarthy's friend, Freda, dies in her sleep at a care home. Father Brown suspects foul play when he smells an unusual odour from the body. Animosity between Freda's son and Freda's friend, Charlie, who is to inherit Freda's estate, arouses Father Brown's suspicions until Charlie dies in his sleep. Another death and Mallory arrests Freda's son. All the victims were terminally ill, and a white feather at each scene suggests they were complicit in their own death by an angel of mercy. Bunty's former nanny Ellen, who is terminally ill and uses a wheelchair, goes missing, and Bunty fears the worst after finding a white feather in her room.
65	5	"The Face of the Enemy"	Christiana Ebohon-Green	Tahsin Güner	5 January 2018
Lady Felicia and Sid return from Northern Rhodesia and visit Kembleford while her husband is in London. MI5 agent Daniel Whittaker blackmails Lady Felicia over her affair with Benedict Northam, who Whittaker says is a Soviet agent. She is to acquire a roll of film he has containing top-secret material. At a fundraising event, she is confronted by Northam, and a sculptor is shot dead. Whittaker orders Mallory to find Lady Felicia as the prime suspect. Father Brown becomes involved with spies, British and Soviet, and does not know who is friend or foe, traitor or patriot. Lady Felicia has to choose between lover and husband, and Moscow get a film they do not expect. Third guest appearance of Alex Price as Sid Carter and second guest appearance (first as more than a voice-over cameo) of Nancy Carroll as Lady Felicia. Daniel Flynn reprises his role of Daniel Whittaker from series 3 episode 1 "The Man in the Shadows".
66	6	"The Devil You Know"	Niall Fraser	Jude Tindall	8 January 2018
Alec Frobisher, deputy commander at Scotland Yard and formerly with the War Crimes Commission, is found garrotted at Kembleford Bowls club. Inspector Mallory is taken off the case, as he was present at the time, and replaced by Inspector Ironside, who is after Mallory's job. Mallory seeks Father Brown's help. Eric and Christina Worcester, immigrants from post-war Europe, are found to have had connections with the SS and a concentration camp, respectively, in occupied Poland. When Eric apparently commits suicide, a typewritten suicide note gives Father Brown the clue to solve the murders.
67	7	"The Dance of Death"	Piotr Szkopiak	Rob Kinsman	9 January 2018
Father Brown, Mrs. McCarthy, and Bunty attend a ballroom dancing competition, and one of the contestants, Lucy Dawes, is murdered. Her blind dancing partner Alexander Walgrave, who found the body, believes he knows who the murderer is and asks Father Brown and Bunty to prove it. A necklace Lucy was wearing is missing, and when it is found in the possession of her fiancé, Oliver Dewitt, Inspector Mallory arrests him. Father Brown realises the answer lies in the past, when Alexander was blinded by being pushed downstairs. To continue his investigation, Father Brown, Mrs. McCarthy, and Bunty join the competition.
68	8	"The Cat of Mastigatus"	Piotr Szkopiak	Mark Hiser & Bridget Colgan	10 January 2018
St Saviours schoolgirl May Lewis is found with a serious head injury in the boiler room of the adjoining boys school, Kemble Martyrs. Father Brown discovers the weapon, a cricket bat, and Inspector Mallory arrests the owner – schoolboy Daniel Gates, May's boyfriend and grandson of the headmaster. May is attacked again in hospital, and school gardener Jack Coll, suspected of attacking her, is found dead. Father Brown uncovers a tradition of brutal corporal punishment at Kemble Martyrs, including the use of a modified cat o' nine tails.
69	9	"The Flower of the Fairway"	Gary Williams	Rachel Flowerday	11 January 2018
Raylan Reeve, an ostentatious American, opens a golf course but is met with anonymous threatening messages. During the inaugural competition, The Flower of the Fairway, Bunty – competing and proving a serious rival to Reeve's granddaughter – finds a body in the reeds. Inspector Mallory allows the contest to continue, until a gunshot is heard and Reeve is found shot dead in his study. Mallory arrests neighbour Hermione Harvey, who had a revolver and hated Reeve for damaging her garden. Father Brown investigates the Reeve family and uncovers a dark family secret, when a daughter can also be a sister.
70	10	"The Two Deaths of Hercule Flambeau"	Paul Gibson	Kit Lambert	12 January 2018
Two items catch Father Brown's eye in the newspaper: Flambeau's death in Italy and the Iron Crown of Lombardy believed to contain a nail from the True Cross on display at Gloucester cathedral. Father Brown opens a letter containing a key that Flambeau had sent to him a few days before his death. A woman claiming to be his wife, Lisandra Flambeau, wants the key, but it is stolen while the presbytery is empty. Father Brown becomes part of an elaborate plan of Flambeau and Lisandra to steal the crown, requiring a key and the combination to a safe. Flambeau double-crosses his wife, and to flush out her husband, she injects Father Brown with a slow-acting poison. Sixth appearance of John Light as Hercule Flambeau.

=== Series 7 (2019) ===
No. overall	No. in series	Title	Directed by	Written by	Original release date
71	1	"The Great Train Robbery"	Paul Gibson	Jude Tindall	7 January 2019
Opera diva Bianca Norman offers Lady Felicia and Mrs. McCarthy passage in her personal Pullman train carriage with her adopted children, latest husband, and staff. The carriage is stopped and robbed; the lights are shot out by two shots fired and a third kills Norman. To escape, the robbers kidnap Lady Felicia and Mrs. McCarthy. Father Brown and Bunty reconstruct the robbery with the family, while Lady Felicia and Mrs. McCarthy deal with the inept robbers to discover that family problems are the motive for both the robbery and the killing. Third guest appearance of Nancy Carroll as Lady Felicia.
72	2	"The Passing Bell"	Ian Barber	David Semple	8 January 2019
Mervyn Glossop, St Mary's Bell Captain, is upset when Canon Fox's nephew Jaime Cheeseman is appointed the new diocesan musical director. After insulting and threatening Cheeseman and the other bell ringers, Glossop is found dead in the bell tower. Father Brown uncovers a web of secrets among the group of bell ringers — gambling, forbidden love, robbery, perjury, and blackmail — giving all a motive to kill Glossop.
73	3	"The Whistle in the Dark"	Ian Barber	Tahsin Güner	9 January 2019
Professor Robert Wiseman, who prides himself on his rationality, organises an auction of a medieval whistle he claims can summon spirits. Father Brown enveigles himself into the house as a severe thunderstorm moves into the area. The bidders soon arrive: an army major, a clairvoyant and her son, and a collector of objets d'art. Father Brown soon finds the professor has been faking the signs of the whistle's power because he needs money for his impoverished daughter and grandchildren. As the night progresses, Wiseman is murdered, and the whistle goes missing. A second murder occurs, with Father Brown's dangerous conclusion that the murderer is one of the remaining guests. Mark Williams and Jeff Rawle previously starred together in Harry Potter and the Goblet of Fire as Arthur Weasley and Amos Diggory respectively.
74	4	"The Demise of the Debutante"	Paul Gibson	Lol Fletcher	10 January 2019
Maude Riley, a nurse at the Rosewood Finishing School for Girls, is murdered following her release from prison for preparing to perform an illegal abortion on student Nell Winford. Maude’s husband, Jimbo, who blames the school's chaplain Reverend Willard for her arrest, believes he killed her and confronts him at the school at gunpoint. Jimbo's gun goes off when he drops it, hitting Mrs McCarthy, and Mallory arrests him. With Bunty's assistance, Father Brown uncovers the secrets of the school's staff and students.
75	5	"The Darkest Noon"	Christiana Ebohon-Green	Kit Lambert	11 January 2019
Father Brown and Inspector Mallory are called to Spencer Hall, but are missing the morning after, when Edmund Noon is found dead in St Mary’s churchyard next to grave of George and Jasmin Haggard, whom he is believed to have murdered. Flashbacks show that Noon lured both Mallory and Father Brown to profess his innocence of the crime. Sergeant Goodfellow, Mrs McCarthy, and Bunty use reasoning, deduction, and clues to try finding the missing men. Even "Blind 'Arry" Slow pitches in, finding an important key in the churchyard.
76	6	"The Sacrifice of Tantalus"	Dominic Keavey	Kit Lambert	14 January 2019
Inspector Mallory and Sergeant Goodfellow pursue Alan Tylett, who is wanted for killing a policeman. They enter the abandoned home where Tylett is hiding, and when a shot is fired at Mallory, Goodfellow jumps forward and takes the bullet. Both officers are hospitalised, with Goodfellow unconscious and in serious condition. Inspector Sullivan – posing as "Inspector Trueman" – is sent from Special Branch to take over the case. He and Father Brown work together to capture Tylett, who protests his innocence. Tylett gives them evidence of a wide-ranging web of police corruption. They realize that if Goodfellow regains consciousness at the hospital, he would be in danger if he is able to identify the shooter. First guest appearance of Tom Chambers as Inspector Sullivan.
77	7	"The House of God"	Paul Gibson	Dan Muirden	15 January 2019
Patrick O'Leary, a stalwart of St Mary's, has been warmly welcoming Mrs McCarthy's help with his gardens. His gestures turn romantic after his sacked gardener Angelica Evans dies of cyanide poisoning in front of the congregation. Mrs McCarthy and Father Brown uncover the secret of O'Leary's apparent house of God where three women – his gardener, his widowed niece, his housekeeper and her son – lived together. Mrs McCarthy provides Father Brown with the clues to solve the murder, while Inspector Mallory pursues the wrong suspect.
78	8	"The Blood of the Anarchists"	Dominic Keavey	Lol Fletcher	16 January 2019
Lionel, the writer/actor for a performing troupe of travelling anarchists is found dead in a locked farm outbuilding, an apparent suicide. The troupe had been invited to perform by farmer's wife Sally Clegg, who knew troupe leader Titan Stark when she was much younger. Titan is also found dead, leaving the other two members of the troupe in fear for their lives. Titan's daughter Magdelana seeks comfort from married actor Angus Boyle, who rejects her. Inspector Mallory arrests Sally's husband, and Father Brown uncovers the desires within the troupe and the love between husbands and wives.
79	9	"The Skylark Scandal"	Christiana Ebohon-Green	Rachel Smith	17 January 2019
Lord Hollingworth is murdered at the Skylark Youth Hostel, where Father Brown, Mrs McCarthy, Bunty, Inspector Mallory, and Sergeant Goodfellow are all staying on an outing with the Kembleford Ramblers and Twitchers. Ill feeling between Hollingworth and the ramblers was apparent when they crossed his land. His sponsorship of the hostel, nearby convent and girls school ended 15 years previously, and his daughter, Hetty, an old schoolfriend of Bunty’s, has been covering up blackmail letters her father had been receiving.
80	10	"The Honourable Thief"	Paul Gibson	Kit Lambert	18 January 2019
Lady Felicia returns to Kembleford to sell family valuables after her husband, Monty, loses a fortune in a diamond mine. Nicholai Solovey – who previously had offered to buy her necklace, which he claims belonged to his family – steals it and places it in an impregnable safe in his hotel room. Father Brown asks for help from Flambeau, who agrees because Solovey betrayed him in the past. Flambeau hatches a plan using Bunty, Mrs McCarthy, and Lady Felicia as distractions while he attempts to break into the safe. Father Brown fears his trust in Flambeau may be misplaced when he steals the entire contents of the safe, disappears and returns to Paris. Fourth guest appearance of Nancy Carroll as Lady Felicia. Seventh appearance of John Light as Hercule Flambeau.

=== Series 8 (2020) ===
No. overall	No. in series	Title	Directed by	Written by	Original release date
81	1	"The Celestial Choir"	Paul Gibson	Kit Lambert	6 January 2020
The Kembleford Choristers, this year led by Mrs. McCarthy, reach the finals of the Three Counties Choir Competition 1953 at Worcester Cathedral. Mrs. McCarthy arranges a coach to take the choristers – including Sergeant Goodfellow and Lady Felicia, Inspector Mallory, whose daughter is singing in a junior competition, and Father Brown. Events conspire to prevent them reaching Worcester in time. Father Brown suspects sabotage by one of the choristers, but Mallory and Mrs. McCarthy suspect someone from a rival choir. A dark secret from the past proves all of them right. Fifth guest appearance of Nancy Carroll as Lady Felicia.
82	2	"The Queen Bee"	Dominic Keavey	David Semple	7 January 2020
Beekeeper Beatie May – the flamboyant, outgoing, over-protective mother of her adopted son Shambu – is found dead in a smoke-filled room. May had wanted to add a codicil to her will with an anagram for her son to decipher leading to the location of a diamond hidden on her property. The message was never added, and her solicitor claims to have lost it. Mallory arrests Shambu because of recent accidents affecting his mother. Father Brown talks with Miss Slither, her neighbour of sixty years who had recently been insulted by May. A missing cake and a photograph of a soldier killed in the First World War who was May's gardener provide the answer.
83	3	"The Scales of Justice"	Darcia Martin	Dominique Moloney	8 January 2020
Inspector Mallory arrests Bunty for the murder of wealthy socialite Teddy Neville-Crowley at a party the previous day. Blood on her dress and her admitting that she hit him with a branch while fighting off his advances send her to trial, where her improper behavior is laid bare. Looking to clear Bunty, Father Brown and Sergeant Goodfellow, discover Teddy was being blackmailed, a secret child whose mother killed herself, and a sister-in-law who hated him. Father Brown gains access to Teddy's blood-soaked clothes and discovers an anomaly of blood on his socks. With Goodfellow and Mallory, they search amongst grass cuttings for a broken fingernail.
84	4	"The Wisdom of the Fool"	Paul Gibson	Lol Fletcher	9 January 2020
The "Convention of Merriment" fair of jesters, led by an ex-chief inspector, is in Kembleford, birthplace of comedian Uncle Mirth. When a discredited doctor stumbles into the fair and dies, Inspector Mallory closes the fair. Father Brown, Mrs McCarthy, and Bunty discover the troupe is part of a group of vigilantes, who travel the country righting what they consider wrongs. Fearing exposure, the group condemns the three to execution, to be carried out by Bunty's friend, whose brother was murdered.
85	5	"The Folly of Jephthah"	Darcia Martin	Kit Lambert	10 January 2020
Flambeau seeks Father Brown's help to catch a thief, Alexander Romanici, who is actually Flambeau's daughter Marianne Delacroix. She has been stealing items ahead of her father, including from an Italian crime lord, Vincenzo Murgida (Vincenzo Nicoli), who will kill to recover his property. Father Brown is asked to act as referee and organise a contest between the pair, with the loser having to give up criminal ways. Father Brown devises a contest to recover five chess pieces; the person with the most pieces wins. Neither Flambeau nor Father Brown realise Marianne has made a deal with Murgida; a deal he does not intend to honour. Eighth appearance of John Light as Hercule Flambeau.
86	6	"The Numbers of the Beast"	Paul Gibson	Dan Muirden	13 January 2020
Mrs. McCarthy's sister, Roisin, turns up in Kembleford owing money to loan sharks. She takes Mrs. McCarthy to her newfound friend, a fortune teller and lifter of curses. Reading Mrs. McCarthy's tea leaves, he predicts the winning numbers in a charity bingo game worth £730 – a game Mrs. McCarthy wins. Feeling guilty, she gives half the money to the bingo organiser raising money to pay for the restoration of a church roof. Also at the game are Anna Bailey and her husband Peter, who suffers from schizophrenia. When Anna – who had told Father Brown she's discovered a fraud – is found dead and her husband found with the murder weapon, Mallory arrests him. Father Brown looks for the connection between the fortune teller, the bingo organiser, Alison, Peter, and Mrs. McCarthy's win.
87	7	"The River Corrupted"	Jennie Paddon	Kit Lambert	14 January 2020
Sid returns to Kembleford aboard a canal boat with his new girlfriend Maeve and her father, Pat Lochlin. Lochlin has an argument in a pub with local factory owner, Roger Barford, who is later found dead, bludgeoned with one of Lochlin's fishing tools, a Priest, and with a jeweler's receipt for a gold necklace stuffed into his mouth. Barford had asked Lochlin to collect a valuable necklace from a jeweler, but Lochlin replaced it with a cheap imitation. Father Brown discovers Barford got barmaid Polly Beavington her job at the pub after she was dismissed from his factory for theft. The necklace is found in the possession of Maeve, who found it on the ground near her father's boat. Father Brown discovers that Barford truly loved his childless wife, though she suspected her husband of infidelity. Fourth guest appearance of Alex Price as Sid Carter.
88	8	"The Curse of the Aesthetic"	Paul Gibson	Lol Fletcher	15 January 2020
An artist's model, Isabella, appears to commit suicide, though no body is found. Father Brown, Bunty, and Mrs. McCarthy are drawn into artist Benjamin Milton's obsessive and hallucinatory thoughts of Isabella and his overprotective nanny. When the nanny is murdered, Benjamin expects to die. An equally obsessed art critic wants to buy all his artworks of Isabella and is nearly electrocuted. Father Brown discovers finger scratch marks on the inside of a locked store cupboard door in the artist's studio. He also discovers a book of Jacobean plays that the artist loved, which included the play A Chaste Maid in Cheapside; in her suicide note, Isabella referred to herself as a Chaste Maid.
89	9	"The Fall of the House of St Gardner"	Jennie Paddon	Rachel Smith	16 January 2020
Bunty helps her latest boyfriend, Harvey St Gardner, and his sister, fashion designer Lady Vivien St Gardner-Verde, hold a fashion show in Kembleford, housing the entourage at Montague Hall. They are followed by gossip columnist Barbara Farrell, who has Bunty, Harvey, Vivien, her husband Sir Ralph, and top model Camille in her sights for past and present misdemeanours, since Harvey had her sacked for printing gossip about Bunty. When Farrell is murdered, Father Brown uncovers secrets of opium use, gambling debts, assault, and the cryptic message of "deadheading the roses," leading to a back street abortionist in London's East End. Mallory's pursuit of Bunty's boyfriend tests her loyalties.
90	10	"The Tower of Lost Souls"	Dominic Keavey	Tahsin Güner	17 January 2020
Reginald Brody is found dead at the bottom of a tower owned by Alistair Hemsley MP, an apparent suicide by jumping from the sealed roof. Chief Inspector Valentine returns and believes that a red scarf Brody was wearing is related to an eight-year-old murder in which Brody's son was arrested, convicted and recently hanged himself in prison. The next day Valentine and Hemsley's brother William, who had purchased a red scarf the morning before Brody's body was found, go back to the top of the tower. William tells Valentine his family members are "evil" right before someone strikes Valentine over the head, knocking him out. When he regains consciousness, William is lying dead, and a bloody knife is in Valentine's hand. Chief Inspector Sullivan returns to investigate Valentine's arrest, to the annoyance of Inspector Mallory, who had already been moved aside by Valentine. Father Brown with Bunty and Mrs. McCarthy have to solve three murders. They discover a secret room in the house left as a shrine to Hemsley's late father. First guest appearance of Hugo Speer as Inspector Valentine. Second guest appearance of Tom Chambers as Inspector Sullivan. Final regular appearance of Emer Kenny as Bunty Windermere.

=== Series 9 (2022) ===
No. overall	No. in series	Title	Directed by	Written by	Original release date
91	1	"The Menace of Mephistopheles"	Isher Sahota	Dominique Moloney	3 January 2022
Phillip Darlington is stabbed to death, and Inspector Mallory arrests his son Lawrence after finding a knife in his bedroom – a knife that Sergeant Goodfellow saw Mallory plant. After confronting Mallory and observing his unusual behavior, Goodfellow seeks Father Brown's help. Father Brown and Sid Carter discover Mallory's wife and children have been abducted, which complicates matters. Darlington's daughter, Arabella, also returns home from Oxford, having just been married that weekend. Brother and sister claim they slept throughout the night of the murder, Lawrence in the house and Arabella with her new husband in Oxford. A stolen car and a man known to Sid's prison contacts, who Mallory wronged ten years ago, are potential keys to the Inspector's recent behavior. Alex Price as Sid Carter returns to the series.
92	2	"The Viper's Tongue"	Steve M Kelly	Kit Lambert	4 January 2022
Estate owner Walter Penmark is found burnt to death in a locked room after receiving a warning containing a picture of a winged dagger with the legend IGNIS, meaning "fire" in Latin. Peggy Langdon is also murdered with a falling block of ice after receiving a similar warning, GRANDO, meaning "hail". Mrs McCarthy receives a third warning, FAMES, meaning starvation. Lest Mrs McCarthy become the next victim, Father Brown and Sid investigate, discovering that Walter Penmark's wife had committed suicide. She had been the victim of abuse from Penmark, gossip from Mrs. Langdon, and well-meaning advice from Mrs McCarthy to stay in her marriage. Her sister, Ruby Nellins, returned from America for the funeral and stayed on in Kembleford to run a business. Attention also focuses on a businessman trying to buy up several properties in town for a development, including Peggy Langdon's guesthouse and others owned by Walter Penmark.
93	3	"The Requiem for the Dead"	John Maidens	Michelle Lipton	5 January 2022
Notorious child killer Ned Hannigan returns to Kembleford, having served 14 years after confessing to the murder of his childhood girlfriend Maggie Banks. In the midst of Mrs McCarthy's preparation for the Best Kept Village competition, Hannigan is attacked by Maggie's father, and leaves after talking with Father Brown. A little while later Father Brown and Sid, searching for Maggie's mother who was absent from her home, find Hannigan's body in the woods. Inspector Mallory arrests Maggie's mother after finding her fingerprint on Hannigan's watch. Father Brown finds that Maggie's brother, Daniel, had visited Hannigan just before his release from prison. Hannigan had never revealed where the body was. Father Brown wonders why Hannigan returned to Kembleford and who he was meeting, and his only clue in Hannigan's prison bag is a wooden representation of the constellation Gemini.
94	4	"The Children of Kalon"	Jo Hallows	Tahsin Güner	6 January 2022
Gerald Firth (Kalon – see Series 1, Episode 5 "The Eye of Apollo") beseeches Father Brown to speak on his behalf at the mental health facility where he has been confined. Father Brown secures his release but is shocked when Firth rejoins The Church of Apollo, now run by his disciple Tobias. Tobias's partner, Thelma, is unhappy to have Kalon back, as she remembers his past actions with the girls of the church and is concerned for her daughter, Clara. When Thelma is found dead in Kalon's locked room, Inspector Mallory arrests Firth. Father Brown believes Firth is innocent, even though Clara had written to him in prison, and delves into the various relationships at the church. But to solve the crime, he has to fish in murky waters. Michael Maloney reprises his role of Kalon from series 1 episode 5.
95	5	"The Final Devotion"	Steve M Kelly	Kit Lambert	7 January 2022
Cardinal Ratcliffe tasks Father Brown with finding a priceless Papal tiara hidden in a 15th-century castle. Father Brown takes Lady Felicia, visiting after a row with her husband, to pose as a prospective bride looking for a wedding venue and Mrs McCarthy – reluctantly – as the bride's mother. Flambeau appears at the castle, having announced himself to the castle owner, Lady Cecily, as the groom wanting to surprise his fiancée. Flambeau offers his services in finding the tiara and claims to be a reformed man. Circumstances dictate that Father Brown and Flambeau work together to find the tiara when a criminal partner whom Flambeau wronged in the past turns up. Flambeau reveals the real treasure he came in search of. Sid Carter is absent. Sixth guest appearance of Nancy Carroll as Lady Felicia. Ninth guest appearance of John Light as Hercule Flambeau.
96	6	"The New Order"	Jo Hallows	Neil Irvine	10 January 2022
Lord Arthur Hawthorne and his wife return to Kembleford when he retires from editorship of his newspaper. He insists that Father Brown give him special attention, a request the priest politely declines. At Hawthorne's garden party, held to announce his son Gabe's becoming editor, he is threatened by Stanley Buchanan, who was exposed as a homosexual in Hawthorne's paper. As he is about to announce his son's new role, Hawthorne is wounded by a rifle shot. Father Brown finds himself accused of breaking the seal of the confessional and is suspended from his parish, with his place taken by Father Featherstone, Hawthorne's London priest. Inspector Mallory arrests Buchanan, but Hawthorne suspects his wife or son, who is unwilling to join the paper. A second attempt on Hawthorne's life leads to Buchanan's release. With Mrs McCarthy's help, Father Brown investigates and uncovers Hawthorne's philandering, his wife's unhappiness, his son's desire to get away from his father, and Father Featherstone's thwarted ambitions. Sid Carter is absent.
97	7	"The Island of Dreams"	Ruth Carney	David Semple	11 January 2022
Father Brown, Sergeant Goodfellow, Inspector Mallory and his family receive an invitation to the 20th anniversary of Chummy's holiday camp. During the visit, owner Marjorie Chummy – who'd been the target of some nasty pranks – is strangled with an apron belonging to camp maid and general dogsbody Mavis Jug. Inspector Mallory arrests her while Father Brown and Sergeant Goodfellow look at the other camp staff – Jock McCudgeon, Griff Grimshaw, and Sandy Beauchamp – who were kept under a tight rein by Mrs Chummy but who were on stage when her death was heard on the loudspeaker. Father Brown discovers that a child, Billy Fairfield, had died in the camp swimming pool several years earlier when Mavis Jug, then an "Orangecoat" entertainer and in charge of first aid, was away from the area and Mrs Chummy did not try to save him. Mrs McCarthy and Sid Carter are absent.
98	8	"The Wayward Girls"	Ruth Carney	Dominique Moloney	12 January 2022
Bunty, facing a speeding fine issued by Sergeant Goodfellow, agrees to give a talk at Langley Hall, a borstal (British Juvenile Hall) for girls of ages 16-23 years. Bunty's compact mirror is stolen and found in the possession of one of the girls, Brenda Palmer, who is locked out in the courtyard. But soon borstal governor Cecilia Watson is found murdered in the courtyard, and Brenda goes on the run by hiding in Bunty's car. Father Brown and Bunty return to the borstal to help Sergeant Goodfellow's investigation, as Inspector Mallory is on annual leave. They have to unravel the lies and ill feeling between two girls, Brenda and Kate Goodall (who has a secret boyfriend), and tensions among the uniformed staff, as the governor's deputy, the lenient Emily Harris takes charge over long-serving Helen Delaney, who is as hard line as the murdered governor. Father Brown uncovers exploitation of recently released girls. Mrs McCarthy, Inspector Mallory and Sid Carter are absent. First guest appearance of Emer Kenny as Bunty Windermere. First appearance of Ruby-May Martinwood as Brenda Palmer.
99	9	"The Enigma of Antigonish"	Isher Sahota	Lol Fletcher	13 January 2022
Ex-employee Finbar Finch served time in jail after a brutal attack on spa owner Elsie Peters during a robbery at the spa. The long-term effects of the attack have left Elsie with seizures. Finch returns to Kembleford after his release, which rattles Elsie, her husband Captain Peters, and her sister Lola. He meets with Father Brown, vowing that he has a new life since experiencing a religious conversion during his incarceration. Right after the priest leaves, Finch is killed by a shotgun blast to his face. The shotgun used was taken from the spa, and a brooch found at the shooting leads Inspector Mallory to arrest Lola. Father Brown finds a clue in a poem Finch had read, "Antigonish".
100	10	"The Red Death"	John Maidens	Kit Lambert	14 January 2022
Sir Charles Hakeworth is garrotted at a New Year's Eve masked ball held at Montague Hall by Lord "Monty" and Lady Felicia Montague. A death threat, stating that the Red Death was coming for Hakeworth, had already led to Inspector Mallory closing the estate, meaning the killer is among those trapped there. With the aid of Mrs McCarthy, Sid, and Bunty, Father Brown looks for the killer among four people who knew Hakeworth would be present: his wife; his doctor; Bunty's friend Ruth Moulton; and Robert, Earl of Finchmore, whose father committed suicide after Hakeworth's affair with his mother. After Moulton is stabbed, Father Brown sees a figure in a red mask escaping from her room. Lady Felicia, unhappy with her marriage, has a decision to make when a one-way airline ticket to New York arrives from Flambeau. Seventh guest appearance of Nancy Carroll as Lady Felicia. Tenth guest appearance of John Light as Hercule Flambeau. Second guest appearance of Emer Kenny as Bunty Windermere. Last appearances of Sorcha Cusack as Mrs McCarthy and Jack Deam as Inspector Mallory.

=== Series 10 (2023) ===
All episodes for this series became available on the BBC iPlayer from the 6 January 2023

No. overall	No. in series	Title	Directed by	Written by	Original release date	BBC One broadcast
101	1	"The Winds of Change"	John Maidens	Dan Muirden	6 January 2023	6 January 2023
The newly opened Kembleford Model Village features two-inch figurines of village characters such as Father Brown, Sergeant Goodfellow, Mrs McCarthy (who has returned to Ireland) and Bunty (on safari in Africa). A housing development proposed by Harry Grover is causing tensions in the village before a crucial parish council vote. When Joe Telford and Jennifer Mossop, two council members opposed to the development, are murdered, Father Brown notices their figurines in the model were moved before their deaths to the locations where they were killed. Inspector Sullivan, temporary replacement for Inspector Mallory who has transferred to Scotland, arrests Grover who was found with Mossop's body, murder weapon in hand. Father Brown is aided by Mrs Devine, who had hoped to become the next parish secretary before Father Brown gave the position to the efficient Mrs Burns. When Father Brown and Mrs Devine find his figurine is missing, he asks her to find it while he heads towards the police station. Apprehension of the murderer is followed by good news for Mrs Devine and bad news for Inspector Sullivan. First Appearance of Claudie Blakley as Mrs Devine. Return of Tom Chambers as Inspector Sullivan as a series regular.
102	2	"The Company of Men"	Paul Riordan	Dominique Moloney	6 January 2023	13 January 2023
Brenda Palmer, whom Father Brown met at a borstal (youth detention center) for girls, arrives at his door asking for help after being accused of theft by Jasper Granford, the owner of the gentlemen's club where she worked. Lady Felicia and Mrs Devine accompany both to the club. Father Brown quickly discovers the real culprit, the owner's son Bertie. Lady Felicia is annoyed when Granford orders her and Mrs Devine out of the club. When Granford is murdered and his safe robbed, Inspector Sullivan arrests Bertie, who is desperate for money. A club member, Colonel Partridge, has disappeared leaving his jacket at the murder scene, and Bertie admits they were working together on the robbery but not the murder. Granford abused his wife and acquired the club by bankrupting the former owner, who now works as manager. With Mrs Devine's help, Father Brown finds that Granford made his money by bankrupting and then buying several businesses. Night cleaner Moira, who has befriended Brenda, worked in a theatre Granford put out of business. The jacket left at the scene provides a clue, with its odour of candlewax and turpentine. Brenda is taken on by Father Brown as housekeeper. First series regular appearance of Ruby-May Martinwood as Brenda Palmer. Eighth guest appearance of Nancy Carroll as Lady Felicia.
103	3	"The Gardeners of Eden"	Michael Lacey	David Semple	6 January 2023	20 January 2023
Celebrity florist Octavia Eden, diagnosed with a terminal illness, returns to live in Kembleford where she was born. Living at the manor with her daughter, Lizzy Eden, and niece, Noele Scharma, she gives them a series of tasks to determine who will inherit her business. At one of the events, John Mulch, the previous owner of the manor, dies of aconite poisoning. Mulch was an angry, embittered man, and Sullivan arrests his wife, who has Aconitum plants growing in her back garden. Believing her to be innocent, Father Brown probes into the reason Octavia left Kembleford heartbroken 45 years previously and inadvertently gets Brenda Palmer arrested for breaking and entering. The daughter and niece call a truce and complete the last task together, to the delight of the dying Octavia, who knows they had more in common than she had told them.
104	4	"The Beast of Wedlock"	John Maidens	Lol Fletcher	6 January 2023	27 January 2023
The vicar of the village of Wedlock, Rev Duncan, asks for Father Brown's help to find Gabriel Wadey, the missing son of his churchwarden Sam Wadey. Gabriel is believed to have been attacked by a phantom big cat that had already attacked Sylvia Garcia. Her ex-husband, Professor Garcia, was making money by writing about the cat. Father Brown recognises Sam Wadey who saved his life when they were both soldiers in The Great War. When Rev Duncan is found dead, seemingly attacked by the cat, Inspector Sullivan arrests Sam Wadey, based on testimony from the local duchess. Sam is released when she recants, and Father Brown discovers that Professor Garcia was withholding information about Gabriel's affair with Sylvia, who was upset when Gabriel broke off the affair to move to London to earn a living as a gigolo. Rev Duncan's hobby as a zoologist gives Father Brown a clue to the whereabouts of Gabriel and the death of the vicar.
105	5	"The Hidden Man"	Michael Lacey	Tahsin Güner	6 January 2023	3 February 2023
Flambeau believes he is being framed for thefts and murders across Europe when valuables he stole 25 years earlier are re-stolen and his handkerchief calling card left at the scene. Because the last of the stolen items, a gold bracelet, is up for sale at a nearby auction house, he asks for Father Brown's help. Having received an anonymous tip about Flambeau's presence, Inspector Sullivan arrives at the auction house just as a security guard is murdered and the bracelet stolen. Flambeau is captured, secretly passing the bracelet to Father Brown, and claims the auctioneer killed the security guard. Sullivan's arrest of Flambeau may provide his ticket back to Scotland Yard, even though Father Brown finds evidence supporting Flambeau's claim. Father Brown investigates the background of the bracelet, its original theft 25 years ago and the suicide of a businessman. He is kidnapped by the killer and his accomplice, and Flambeau escapes from Sullivan to find Father Brown and the bracelet, aided by Mrs Devine and Brenda. Eleventh guest appearance of John Light as Hercule Flambeau.
106	6	"The Royal Visit"	Paul Riordan	Mark Brotherhood	6 January 2023	10 February 2023
Plans for a royal visit by Princess Margaret to open a new school library in Kembleford are thrown into disarray when the library is vandalised and caretaker Raymond Harrison is murdered. Harrison, a pickpocket who had been in prison, carried a locket with a schoolgirl photo of the current headmistress Amanda Clement. Harrison also owed money to Mayor Wood. Royal protection officer Inspector Beckett and Elizabeth Barnes, royal aide to Princess Margaret, were also present. Inspector Sullivan arrests Clement whose fingerprints were on the murder weapon. Father Brown is more interested in a gold lighter that Barnes had, which actually belonged to Princess Margaret, that had been pickpocketed by Harrison and recovered by Inspector Beckett, who knew of Harrison's past. An old newspaper of Harrison's, now missing, also interests Father Brown, but finding it relies on Inspector Sullivan's memory of a football match played in 1937. It seems likely that the playing of the national anthem at the end of the episode was in memory of the passing of Queen Elizabeth in September 2022.
107	7	"The Show Must Go On"	Miranda Howard-Williams	Sarah-Louise Hawkins	6 January 2023	17 February 2023
The Kembleford Players need help preparing to perform Much Ado About Nothing in memory of the child of director Patrick Maitland and his actress wife Charlotte. Some years earlier, the baby died in her cot while Patrick was looking after her. When Charlotte breaks her leg, Mrs Devine takes the role of Beatrice. Father Brown inveigles his way into playing the Friar, and Sergeant Goodfellow is already playing a number of minor roles. Brenda helps with the papier-mâché props. After leading man Jeremy Sandford is poisoned by weed killer in his hip flask, Father Brown discovers he was a con-man and blackmailer who had ruined the lives of his victims, including members of the players' families. He always operated with an accomplice, and Inspector Sullivan receives anonymous letters leading him to arrest first a local farmer and then Patrick Maitland, who was Sandford's best friend and had an identical hip flask. Mrs Devine is pleased when Inspector Sullivan agrees to play Benedick.
108	8	"The Sands of Time"	Dominic Keavey	Neil Irvine	6 January 2023	24 February 2023
Brenda is doing extra work at clock collector Oswald Hartigan's home and is smitten with his manservant Jake Hunt. Father Brown and Mrs Devine are invited to the unveiling of a valuable world-famous Nightingale clock. Also in attendance are Hartigan's young wife Betty, previously his maid who he married after his first wife died, his grasping son Lord Hartigan, and previously estranged friend watch repairer Stan Hoskens. When the son is found dead, apparently hit by the clock, which is missing, Father Brown notices coal dust in his hand. Inspector Sullivan arrests Hoskens after discovering a blood-stained handkerchief in his pocket. Brenda discovers the clock hidden in Hunt's wardrobe. Father Brown has noted a sudden reconciliation between father and son before the murder, coal dust on Oswald's tie, his wife's unusual craving, Hosken's relationship with Hartigan, and Jake Hunt's past as a Polish wartime refugee.
109	9	"The Wheels of Wrath"	Dominic Keavey	Matthew Cooke & Vincent Lund	6 January 2023	3 March 2023
Motorbike gang the Ton Up's arrive in Kembleford, one of whom, Roger Norton, seems to be on a pilgrimage, lighting a candle in St Mary's. When he is killed by barbed wire strung across the road, Father Brown investigates. The suspects were all at a local cafe owned by Denny Beaton, who is estranged from his family and from whom gang leader Billy Turner had stolen money. Norton had taken Turner's place in a race at the last minute. Cafe assistant Lance South had an argument and threatened Turner. South was also in love with Lisa Morris, who is trying to escape her domineering mother by leaving with Turner, who rebuffs her. Inspector Sullivan arrests South. Father Brown is more interested in why Norton had lit a candle in church, and with Sergeant Goodfellow's help discovers Turner and Norton were involved in the death of a young girl. Father Brown challenges Turner to a race – bicycle v motorbike.
110	10	"The Serpent Within"	Miranda Howard-Williams	Dan Muirden	6 January 2023	10 March 2023
Inspector Sullivan finds himself in the cells after his informant Harry Davenport is murdered during the course of a burglary while Sullivan was staking out the wrong house. Woman Police Sergeant Francis arrives from London and discovers stolen jewellery from past robberies in the Kembleford area in Sullivan's desk and home. Francis had been sent by Detective Superintendent Alan Alford – the very man Sullivan was to testify against at a police corruption hearing that could have seen him return to his old job in London. Father Brown and Mrs Devine are determined to prove his innocence, which is difficult, as he had been pawning his possessions to send cash to his parents, whose London home had burned down. The situation becomes more tense when Mrs Devine is kidnapped by a ruthless killer demanding that Sullivan confess to the robberies. Sergeant Goodfellow, waiting for his Inspector's exam result, is at loggerheads with the fast-tracked Sergeant Francis.

=== Series 11 (2024) ===
All episodes for this series became available on the BBC iPlayer from the 5 January 2024

No. overall	No. in series	Title	Directed by	Written by	Original release date	BBC One broadcast
111	1	"The Kembleston Olimpicks"	Miranda Howard-Williams	Dan Muirden	5 January 2024	5 January 2024
The 1955 Kembleston Olimpicks between the villages of Kembleford and Hambleston bring murderous tensions between the teams with accusations of cheating and contestants unable to compete. Kembleford team captain, Dr Geoffrey Fleming, disqualifies his own brother Brian for cheating, despite his claims of innocence. When a contestant is poisoned during the spinach-eating contest with a bowl meant for Dr Fleming, Inspector Sullivan arrests Brian for murder. To prove his innocence, Father Brown has to find someone with a grudge against the doctor and is not short of candidates. Mrs Devine and Inspector Sullivan's not-so-secret affair is exposed when her son, Eddie Devine, who idolised his dead father Ronald, arrives home unexpectedly. A photograph taken by Ronald Devine at the 1952 Olimpicks gives Father Brown a clue. First appearance of Barney Wilkinson as Eddie Devine.
112	2	"The Forensic Nun"	Ian Barber	Neil Irvine	5 January 2024	12 January 2024
The Kembleford Arts and Crafts Fair, organised by newcomer to the village Gaynor Garfield, brings artistic rivalries to the fore, which is compounded when renowned artist Marmaduke Snell arrives. His obnoxious behaviour towards the other artists and craftspeople is tolerated by Garfield. When he is poisoned by cyanide in a bottle of wine, Inspector Sullivan arrests the winemaker – none other than Sister Boniface who brought the wine, which she had bottled herself at her nearby convent, St Agnes. With Mrs Devine's and Sergeant Goodfellow's help, Father Brown frees Sister Boniface from jail without Inspector Sullivan's knowledge, allowing her to prove her innocence. The discovery of a wedding ring, a missing tin of metal polish and glucose tablets provide a solution. Second appearance of Lorna Watson as Sister Boniface. Ingrid Oliver, Watson's comedy double act partner is also in the episode. This episode serves as a prequel to the spin-off series Sister Boniface Mysteries (also starring Watson), which began airing in 2022.
113	3	"The Hermit of Hazelnut Cottage"	Miranda Howard-Williams	David Semple	5 January 2024	19 January 2024
Brenda receives a letter apparently from Dr Angus McClurgy of Butterley Rise. In 1944, she was sent to live with him as an evacuee until he sent her to a children's home. Brenda, Father Brown and Mrs Devine visit McClurgy, who lives as a hermit in a ramshackle cottage. He denies writing the letter and does not initially recognize Brenda. Father Brown discovers that the letter was sent by neighbour Dotty Finglesham because McClurgy was holding up a property developer who was going to provide new bungalows for the residents. McClurgy's refusal leads the developer to purchase an adjacent piece of land, Butterley Meadow, for the bungalows, much to the distress of several residents, including Brenda's former fellow evacuee Susan Payne. The developer is later found murdered and buried in a grave far bigger than required. He had cheated landowner Lord Sprockett into selling him the meadow, which Finglesham had used as a shrine to her husband, who was killed flying in the First World War. Brenda also remembers Susan's claim to have seen an injured German pilot who was shot down nearby. Father Brown has to uncover buried World War II memories from all those present.
114	4	"The Last Supper"	Paul Riordan	Sarah-Louise Hawkins	5 January 2024	26 January 2024
A food fair comes to Kembleford hosted by Mrs Devine's old school friend, chef and cookery book writer Harriet Sykes and her publisher husband David. With her two chefs, Lei Yen and Rafi Fardi, Sykes is out to impress London hotel owner Hugo Pearl-Blythe and gives Mrs Devine a lot of unwelcome responsibilities. Restaurant critic Chester Gates turns up unexpectedly, and his vicious ego upsets everyone. He is about to publish his memoirs with chapters about all three chefs. When Gates is found dead from rat poison, the evidence leads Inspector Sullivan to arrest Lei Yen. She had been in Gates' room, and the chapter of his memoirs about her father is missing. Father Brown looks into the backgrounds of all concerned – including David Sykes who had secretly sent Gates tickets – while Brenda and Mrs Devine try to keep the fair running.
115	5	"The Father, The Son"	Ian Barber	Tahsin Güner	5 January 2024	2 February 2024
Flambeau returns to Kembleford after receiving the obituary of his father Gabriel Hawksworth. He discovers that his father lured him there to help recover a gold crown belonging to the Vatican, which Hawksworth had stolen from a museum for crime baron Drake Underwood. A security guard, Elliot Tucker, was killed during the robbery. Flambeau reluctantly agrees, not trusting his father's claim of a religious conversion and a desire to help the guard's widow and young son. Discovered by Underwood while stealing the crown, Flambeau escapes with his father's help. Along with Father Brown, they are pursued by Underwood, his son and two henchmen, with Inspector Sullivan not far behind. The three end up at the widow's home with disastrous results. Fleeing to nearby woods, Underwood catches up with them, and Father Brown's priestly office is needed. Twelfth guest appearance of John Light as Hercule Flambeau.
116	6	"The Quill of Osric"	Paul Riordan	Lol Fletcher	5 January 2024	9 February 2024
Murder with Tea, an annual celebration weekend of local crime writers, is held at the home of Lady Violet. Entrants for the crime-writing award vie for The "Quill of Osric," in memory of famed crime writer Osric Wolf, who committed suicide exactly a year earlier. Among the entrants are ex-Gloucester University students Walter Mitford, sponsored by Lady Violet, and Jack Wilmott, there at the insistence of his overbearing father, acclaimed crime writer Sir Kingsley Wilmott. A literary agent, Miss Lipton, is on hand, looking to sign a new author. When Jack Wilmott and then Miss Lipton are attacked, Father Brown investigates and discovers accusations of plagiarism going back years. Jack Wilmott won a university prize that Mitford felt should have been his. Father Brown also discovers Jack Wilmott's latest book has a character with a promiscuous history similar to that of Lady Violet's youth – a past that she had kept hidden from everybody except Osric Wolf.
117	7	"The Word of the Condemned"	Michael Lacey	Dominique Moloney	5 January 2024	16 February 2024
Lady Felicia asks Father Brown to investigate the death of her goddaughter, Sophie Blackthorn, believed to be the fourth victim of The Bride Killer, William Harrow, who is awaiting hanging. Lady Felicia has been told her goddaughter's husband Ralph may have killed her. Father Brown, Lady Felicia, Mrs Devine, and Brenda go to the Blackthorn Institute, a college for criminal studies set up in memory of Sophie and run by Ralph and forensic pathologist Professor Pritchard. They meet student Daniel Price, who has evidence pointing to another suspect, but he is poisoned before he can share his findings. Father Brown has to untangle the close relationships among husband, wife, the husband's sister, Professor Pritchard, and the professor's assistant. A photograph of a tyre from a local butcher's van is the only clue. Ninth guest appearance of Nancy Carroll as Lady Felicia.
118	8	"The Last Tango in Kembleford"	Michael Lacey	Rebecca Ramsden	5 January 2024	23 February 2024
The Fletcham's Dance School is run by brother and sister Derek and Gillian Fletcham, who hold a talent showcase that the ambitious Gillian expects to propel her to stardom. She ditches her brother in favour of Italian professional Mario Cantoloni, whom she knows from years ago. When Gillian is murdered, Inspector Sullivan arrests the brother, who was found with the body, blood on his hands and his sister's cherished necklace in his pocket. Father Brown delves into other members of the dance school, including husband and wife Robert and Pauline Highbury. Robert supported his wife's love of dancing by bankrolling the school, which is in debt because of Gillian's profligacy. Father Brown looks for a motive other than dancing, and a herb garden with yarrow, which can induce an abortion, provides a clue, as does an appointment in Robert's diary at a Catholic adoption agency. He also knows Cantoloni is not who he seems.
119	9	"The Dead of Night"	Carys Lewis	Sarah Anson	5 January 2024	1 March 2024
In the days before Louisa Ross's memorial mass, wealthy Bernard Ross is convinced his daughter, who committed suicide while suffering an unusual illness, has risen from her grave. His conviction that she is a vampire is fed by friend Gilbert Gallamore. The arrival of vampire hunter Silas O'Hagen compounds the story, and he offers to destroy the vampire for a fee. Father Brown tries to dispel Ross's fears, but that night Gallamore is found dead seemingly from a vampire bite. Louisa Ross's necklace, which had been buried with her, is on the floor beside the victim. Inspector Sullivan is ill, so Sergeant Goodfellow is temporally promoted to investigate the crime, along with several fraud cases in nearby villages. Father Brown helps Goodfellow as they interview Ross, housemaid Janice Higgins, Ross's sister-in-law Christine Kipley, and O'Hagen. A probable cause for Louisa's mysterious symptoms, what she wrote in her diary, and a photo in the memorial booklet provide further clues.
120	10	"The Scars of War"	Carys Lewis	Dan Muirden	5 January 2024	8 March 2024
A memorial to the Kembleford Home Guard bomb disposal unit brings old memories to the fore: the death of Mrs Devine's husband as he approached an unexploded bomb and the disappearance of Rachael Waterson's young son and his bicycle. Attending the memorial are Eddie Devine wearing his father's medals, widow Rachael Waterson, Private John Carlton, conscientious objector Oscar Treadwell, and overbearing and vindictive Captain Fred Howton. Eddie confronts Howton, claiming that he should have dealt with the bomb that killed his father, and when Howton is murdered that night by a bullet fired from 64 yards away, Eddie is implicated when a matching rifle is found in Mrs Devine's shed. Inspector Sullivan asks Father Brown to help prove Eddie's innocence. Father Brown uncovers a wartime affair, a marriage ended, wartime service unrecognised, and a recent dismissal. A bicycle buried in the woods and a wartime logbook lead Father Brown to the murderer and a ticking bomb. Mrs Devine is upset with Inspector Sullivan for arresting her son and after seeing him with a younger woman. Second appearance of Barney Wilkinson as Eddie Devine.

=== Series 12 (2025) ===
All episodes for this series became available on the BBC iPlayer from the 10 January 2025

No. overall	No. in series	Title	Directed by	Written by	Original release date	BBC One broadcast
121	1	"The Battle of Kembleford"	Ian Barber	Dan Muirden	10 January 2025	10 January 2025
The re-enactment of the 16th century battle of Kembleford causes tension among three historians. When one is killed, Inspector Sullivan reluctantly arrests the dead man's wife, who had argued with him the previous day. Father Brown believes her to be innocent and investigates the history of the battle and backgrounds of the three historians. Inspector Sullivan's visiting father, an ex-policeman, is shocked to find Father Brown and his son's fiancé Mrs Devine investigating, believing it detrimental to his son's career, and issues an ultimatum to his son. Guest appearance of Denis Lawson as Walter Sullivan.
122	2	"The Kembleston Players"	Paul Gibson	Neil Irvine	10 January 2025	17 January 2025
Hambleston Amateur Dramatic Society (HADS) is in trouble with a lack of members, and chairman Teddy Sadwick asks Mrs Devine for help. She agrees and enlists Father Brown, Brenda, Inspector Sullivan, and Sergeant Goodfellow to play various roles in a play called The Most Perfect Murder. The playwright is Father Osmond Lindsay, a fan of Father Brown, who is stumped for an ending. When he does devise an ending based on a newspaper report of a real murder, it sets off a chain of events that leads to the murder of Herman Jolly, found behind a panel of scenery he had constructed. The apparent murder weapon was a spanner owned by Bonnie Codling, who Inspector Sullivan arrests only to release her when Emerald Baptiste's fingerprint is found on the tool. The two priests investigate using a notebook Father Osmond found on the dead man's body and uncover fraud, a baby born out of wedlock and an earlier murder.
123	3	"The Horns of Cernunnos"	Paul Gibson	Lol Fletcher	10 January 2025	24 January 2025
Father Brown is called to the home of old friend Sir Benedict Gellert, whose daughter Marianne is having visions of a horned devil and a hooded man. The home has a pagan burial grounds within its boundaries. With Father Brown are companions Mrs Devine and Brenda, and they all stay the night. In the morning Mrs Devine wakes up in the bed of Sir Benedict with him lying by her side stabbed to death. Inspector Sullivan has to arrest her but pleads with Father Brown to find the real killer. Suspects in the house are Sir Benedict's troubled daughter Marianne, his second wife Lilith who sleeps in a separate bedroom, Dr Marcellus Lasden a very old friend of Sir Benedict who is treating Marianne, and gamekeeper Fenwick. The only clues are a thumbprint in a book and a locked window in Marianne's room.
124	4	"The Invisible Friends"	Miranda Howard-Williams	David Semple	10 January 2025	31 January 2025
Radio producer and writer, Kenneth Clay, brings the cast of "The Muckles, an everyday story of farming folk" to his childhood home in Kembleford to record episodes of the show. When obnoxious cast member Charlie Chumley is murdered, Inspector Sullivan arrests fellow cast member Elizabeth Warmley for poisoning his throat spray. Father Brown hears the recorded script for a future episode, which provides a motive for all the cast members. A wartime map of bombed cities in Britain and St Mary's bells provide clues to uncovering a wartime secret and the murderer.
125	5	"The Cup of Calabria"	Ian Barber	Tahsin Güner	10 January 2025	7 February 2025
Cardinal Papillon asks Father Brown to contact Flambeau to help recover the Cup of Calabria, believed to made from wood of the true cross and stolen by a rogue priest, Father Vincent Lazarus. Flambeau, still grieving the loss of his father, agrees to help Father Brown starting at a private auction of religious artifacts. The bidding for the cup ends at £70,000, but the successful bidder collapses and dies before the sum is paid. Brenda is sworn to secrecy about Flambeau's presence, but Mrs Devine finds out and feels she must tell Inspector Sullivan. A trail of deceit and double cross among criminals leads to Sullivan's capturing Flambeau and Father Brown recovering the cup. Thirteenth guest appearance of John Light as Hercule Flambeau.
126	6	"The Lord of the Dance"	Caroline Slater	Rebecca Ramsden	10 January 2025	14 February 2025
The South West regional finals of TV ballroom dancing series Go Dancing is held at The Hambleston Grand hotel, ahead of the 1955 finals. Father Brown and Mrs Devine support Brenda, who has agreed to partner Frederick Thorncastle, whose dancing partner has glandular fever. Brenda finds Thorncastle obnoxious, and the rivalry between the three main dance couples is toxic. An attempt on Thorncastle's life fails when Brenda pushes him out of the way of a falling spotlight. Father Brown investigates and discovers motives among the other two couples and the TV producer: one has a secret that at the time could have him jailed, another has a past criminal record, and another is mourning a brother who died after a dancing accident. The only clue is a pair of dancing shoes, and Father Brown has to take decisive action to prevent another deadly attempt on Thorncastle's life. Guest appearance of Angela Rippon as the Dancing Duchess.
127	7	"The Deserving Poor"	Caroline Slater	Lou Ramsden	10 January 2025	21 February 2025
Father Brown, Mrs Devine, and Brenda visit Thorp's Almhouses for women, having received a letter requesting spiritual advice, apparently from resident Adelaide Jenks. The Almshouse is run by martinet Cormac Thorp and has been in his family for years. Father Brown discovers someone they know hiding in Jenk's home – Harold "Blind 'arry" Slow, who actually sent the letter. Although the Almshouse is for women only, Slow has been staying with Jenks since losing his home. When Thorp's body is discovered the next morning, having fallen from the roof, Chief Inspector Sullivan arrests Slow, who confesses to killing Thorp. Father Brown uncovers the discontent of the residents and Thorp's plans to sell the property – something the residents do not want to happen. Guest appearances of Anita Dobson as Eunice Lytton and Linda Thorson as Gladys Carpenter.
128	8	"The Sisters of Aeschylus"	Michael Lacey	Liberty Martin	10 January 2025	28 February 2025
Lady Felicia's novel badly needs rewriting and editing, and she invites The Sisters of Aeschylus, three published writers, to Montague Hall to assist her before a reading to invited publishers and dignitaries. She also invites Father Brown, Brenda, Mrs Devine, and Inspector Sullivan. Unexpectedly, publisher Sherman Quinn and his assistant turn up a day early. The intoxicated Quinn insults the "sisters" and cruelly dismisses Lady Felicia's book. The next morning he is found dead from cyanide poisoning. Based on the evidence, Inspector Sullivan arrests one of the sisters. Father Brown recovers a ring with the letters SQ in the hearth and discovers, with help from Sister Boniface, how the poison was administered. He uncovers the other sisters' secrets and examines the mysterious death of Sherman's father, Samuel, two months earlier. Mrs Devine is mistakenly jealous of Lady Felicia's intentions towards Chief Inspector Sullivan. Tenth guest appearance of Nancy Carroll as Lady Felicia.
129	9	"The Puzzle of Banburismus"	Miranda Howard-Williams	Rebecca Ramsden	10 January 2025	7 March 2025
At the annual general meeting of Kembleford's Sewing Circle, Sergeant Goodfellow's wife, Violet, is voted down as chair in favour of Catherine Glover, who has an ambitious idea for a tapestry depicting Kembleford's history and its people. Glover is murdered, and Inspector Sullivan arrests William Fitzgibbon, whom he believes was having an affair with Glover. Father Brown investigates the sewing circle – including Fitzgibbon's wife and expert seamstress Judith Skelton. The only clues are a wooden comb with broken teeth, similar to one William Fitzgibbon had, and some poems exchanged between Glover and Fitzgibbon. This leads Father Brown to uncover wartime secrets regarding the sinking of an aircraft carrier. The case has consequences for Sergeant Goodfellow and for Mrs Devine, who has been forbidden to help Father Brown after an ultimatum by Inspector Sullivan's father. Sullivan also receives news that will change his and Mrs Devine's life.
130	10	"The Blessing of the Father"	Michael Lacey	Dan Muirden	10 January 2025	14 March 2025
The days leading up to the wedding of Inspector Edgar Sullivan and Isabel Devine take a turn for the worse when the car of his father, Walter Sullivan, is vandalised and he is wounded by a pistol shot. Father Brown and the suspended Sergeant Goodfellow investigate. Goodfellow finds the gun, a police pistol signed out to Detective Superintendent Archibald Drake, a wedding guest who finds that his unwanted early retirement was engineered by Walter Sullivan to make room for Edgar's promotion. Another suspect is wedding florist Irene Frost, whom Walter fired because of her criminal record. Mrs Devine's son Eddie finds a small diamond next to the vandalised car. Father Brown discovers that, 40 years previously, Edgar's mother Grace was prevented by Walter from pursuing her own career as a doctor, something she had just learned from Drake. Frost also mentions to Father Brown that her fiancé was killed during the blitz of 1941. Second appearance of Denis Lawson as Walter Sullivan, eleventh guest appearance of Nancy Carroll as Lady Felicia and third appearance of Barney Wilkinson as Eddie Devine. Guest appearance of Cherie Lunghi as Grace Sullivan.

=== Series 13 (2026) ===
All episodes for this series became available on the BBC iPlayer from the 5 January 2026

No. overall	No. in series	Title	Directed by	Written by	Original release date	BBC One broadcast
131	1	"The Good Refuge"	Sean Healy	Dan Muirden	9 January 2026	9 January 2026
Mrs McCarthy returns to Kembleford, ostensibly to sell her house but really to see her unwed niece Máira with six-week-old twins. Mrs McCarthy had sent her from Ireland to Our Lady's Good Refuge for Penitent Women. Finding Máira had absconded from the refuge with one of her twins, Mrs McCarthy is unsympathetic to the story her niece tells about Sister Agatha and Nurse Dorothy Hyde who run the refuge. Father Brown decides to investigate. When Hyde is murdered and Máira has taken her second twin, she is arrested by Inspector Sullivan. Father Brown has to clear her name and makes an enemy of Canon Fox; the Sullivans solve a housing problem; and Mrs McCarthy learns a salutary lesson.
132	2	"The Hole in My Heart"	Ian Barber	Rebecca Ramsden	9 January 2026	16 January 2026
The Hart Brothers (Johnny and Jack), an aspiring Rock and Roll band, come to Kembleford to play a one-off concert, arranged by their ambitious manager, to impress representatives of Decca Records. When Johnny the front man of the band is electrocuted at rehearsals by a faulty amplifier, Inspector Sullivan arrests the brothers estranged mother Meredith Blunkett. Believing her innocent, Father Brown investigates brother Jack, the real talent behind the band, manager Howie Brooks and band photographer Betty Jacobson. All have a motive, but a bracelet with the initials JB and the death of apprentice electrician Jeremy Burke in Salford a few years earlier are his only clues.
133	3	"The Palace by the Sea"	Paul Riordan	David Semple	9 January 2026	23 January 2026
Inspector Sullivan's cash-strapped Aunty Pat invites him and his wife to a grand reopening of her hotel at the seaside, with the proviso they help her get the hotel ready for an inspector who could list it in a prestigious guide. Mrs Sullivan invites Father Brown, Sergeant Goodfellow, and Brenda to help out. The hotel's deputy managers, Raymond and Cynthia Wendle, met and married at the hotel thirty years ago. Unexpectedly former employee Max Bishop turns up as a guest. He had made up an inseparable trio with Raymond and Cynthia until Aunty Pat sacked him for stealing from guest rooms. When Bishop turns up dead on the beach the next morning, the local police sergeant arrests Aunty Pat for murder. Father Brown discovers the Wendle's have separate bedrooms and that Cynthia had invited Bishop in order to request a loan to save the hotel. He also finds that Bishop had plans to turn the hotel into flats. A photograph of Aunty Pat, Raymond and Cynthia provides another clue.
134	4	"The Crackpot and the Dummy"	Miranda Howard-Williams	Lol Fletcher	9 January 2026	30 January 2026
Uncle Mirth returns to the Wedlock Theatre with his dummy Mr Kafka. During rehearsals Mr Kafka "announces" that Eric Gramby, co-owner of the theatre, had an affair with Uncle Mirth's late wife Monique several years earlier. Later Gramby is found dead on stage, murdered with Uncle Mirth's cut-throat razor and Mr Kafka sitting on the stage with blood on his gloves. Inspector Sullivan arrests Uncle Mirth, who may be having a nervous breakdown. Father Brown, unsure of Uncle Mirth's innocence because of a love letter from Monique to Gramby found under Mr Kafka's hand in Uncle Mirth's dressing room, investigates the motives of others – including Uncle Mirth's niece and manager, of whom Gramby had taken lewd photographs; Mrs Gramby whose father began the theatre, which she suspects her husband wanted to sell; and Kount Volker, a has-been comedian whose career had been stifled by Gramby.
135	5	"The Shadow of Lazarus"	Paul Riordan	Asher Pirie	9 January 2026	6 February 2026
Flambeau and Principal Officer Francis from the Vatican turn up at Father Brown's to enlist his help in recovering a precious icon stolen some years before. The only clues are held by a prisoner, ex-priest Vincent Lazarus, who has sworn to kill Father Brown and Flambeau. Lazarus gives Father Brown a bible clue in exchange for his travelling Stole. The clue leads to a wall safe in the home of Lady Veronica's, an old flame of Flambeau's, but while in another room the safe is opened and the icon gone. Lazarus tricks Father Brown with more bible clues to bring a bomb into the prison and uses it to escapes. From the escape Father Brown and Flambeau realise where the icon is and come face to face with Lazarus who, has killed one accomplice and then another for refusing to kill. Fourteenth guest appearance of John Light as Hercule Flambeau.
136	6	"The Obedient Wife"	Miranda Howard-Williams	Rebecca Ramsden	9 January 2026	27 February 2026
A charity auction organised by the Costswold Policemen's Wives Society, who invite Mrs Sullivan and Mrs Goodfellow to cover for absent committee members. Led by Mrs Webber, the superintendent's wife, the committee is fuelled by jealousy and tension among members and their husbands. When the superintendent is found dead and Mrs Goodfellow unconscious in the same room, Inspector Sullivan arrests Mrs Webber, who had been meeting another man every Thursday. Father Brown believing she is innocent uncovers her secret and a shortlist of names; one of whom was due to be promoted by the superintendent. A new radio system the superintendent was trialling and a bank robbery when a policeman, working with one of the men on list, was killed might provide the solution.
137	7	"The Bodhi Tree"	Vicki Kisner	Rebecca Ramsden	9 January 2026	6 March 2026
Lady Felicia invites Father Brown, Mrs Sullivan, and Brenda to her friend's, Francis Dewfield, manor that she has converted to a Buddhist retreat. There they meet Lama Tenzin Choda, her spiritual guide, Bastian Hawthorn, her spiritual friend, and Shuggie Gower, a Scottish convert living in a tent. Also there is her niece Tabitha Dewfield celebrating her twenty-first birthday who is a non-believer. There is to be a Buddhist blessing to generate publicity for the retreat that needs money to keep going. When Francis is poisoned and Inspector Sullivan arrests Choda, Father Brown uncovers everybody had a motive for murder and his only clue is a paperclip among the remains of a burnt letter.
138	8	"The Oath of Silence"	Vicki Kisner	Dominique Moloney	9 January 2026	13 March 2026
Mrs Sullivan is called as a juror in the murder of pottery owner Arthur Goddard, a friend of Father Brown, brutally stabbed. The defendant David Ensley changes his plea to not guilty. Sacked by Goddard on the day he was murdered for firing the kiln twice and ruining the products. Ensley was also in possession of money from the firm's cash box. Father Brown discovers from Goddard's estranged daughter Josie, that Ensley had been left his house and pottery that would revert to her if Ensley was hanged. The estrangement caused by Josie's elopement at 16 with publican Royce Holland. Events turn sinister when Mrs Sullivan is threatened; compounded by one of the other jurors to find Ensley guilty. Inspector Sullivan finds an abandoned blood soaked car thought to be owned by a missing smuggler. A rival pottery owner who had tried to buy the pottery that would have paid off debts owed by Royce bring them under Father Brown's suspicions.
139	9	"The Power of Suggestion"	David Innes Edwards	Philip Ralph	9 January 2026	20 March 2026
Producer Ron Sanderson moves filming of a commercial for Flix soap powder to Kembleford because of difficulties with fading Hollywood star Katherine Vale. In tow are copy writer Meg Wilson, Eva Richards a starlet being mentored by Vale; Frank Hicks owner of the company that makes Flix unexpectedly also turns up. Tensions on set lead to, during, a break, the murder of Vale. Inspector Sullivan arrest Frank Hicks with the available evidence while Father Brown turns his attention to the other three suspects. Production of the commercial continues with starlet Eva Richards and Mrs Sullivan stepping in for a mother daughter scenario that Meg Wilson is unhappy about. Another clue is Vale's earrings turning green.
140	10	"The Bishop's Revenge"	Ian Barber	Neil Irvine	9 January 2026	27 March 2026
Canon Fox returns from Rome as Bishop-elect for the diocese and announces he intends to transfer Father Brown to a Scottish parish. Fox is staying in his old parish with a friend Lord Rufus Silk, and his daughter Lady Martha. Lord Silk was widowed when his wife gave birth to Martha; his only son, Bertie Silk, was killed in action eleven years previously. The night before his institution Fox is kidnapped and the Silk family and Mrs Tilda Nettles, parish secretary to the current incumbent Father Lindsay who is Foxe's nephew, come under suspicion. Father Brown and Father Lindsay search for clues and a letter regarding Bertie Silk provides the motive that Fox cannot confirm due to a confessional oath. Father Lindsay makes a request to his uncle which affects Brenda's job as housekeeper to Father Brown. Final appearance of Ruby-May Martinwood as Brenda Palmer.
