= Chloe Hayward =

British fashion model and actress

- Born: Chloe Hayward
- Occupations: Fashion model; actress
- Modeling information
- Agency: Elite Model Management

Chloe Hayward is an English fashion model and actress from London.

== Early life and education ==
Hayward attended Tiffin Girls' School. She studied English and Drama at the University of Birmingham.

== Breakthrough ==
Hayward was discovered after being spotted by Sarah Leon, an agent of Next Model Management. Whilst still at school, she appeared on the covers of such publications as Glamour, The Independent Magazine and Tank Magazine. In 2007, Hayward fronted the advertising campaign of Topshop, a chain of women's clothing shops. In 2009, she featured in a fashion campaign for Agent Provocateur, an international lingerie brand based in the United Kingdom.

She has featured in editorial shoots for Vogue, Elle, Dazed & Confused and Cosmopolitan. She has appeared on the cover of S Magazine, Suitcase Magazine and Vogue Italia. She has worked with British photographer Rankin for Hunger Magazine and worked with David Sims, Ellen Von Unwerth and David Burton. She has featured in campaigns for Clinique.

Hayward began her film career with the short film Shoot Me! directed by Kate Hardie and featuring Claire Skinner. She was in Stephen Frears's The Program 2015 as Lance Armstrong's wife Kristin, and had multiple roles in Sky Arts "Likely Stories" based on Neil Gaiman's short stories of the same name.

She lives in New York.
