= Asha Leo =

English model

- Born: 5 January 1982 (age 44); Kingston upon Thames, England
- Occupations: Fashion model; television presenter
- Years active: 1995–present
- Modelling information
- Height: 5 ft 9 in (1.75 m)
- Hair colour: Brown
- Eye colour: Green
- Agency: ICM, 3 Arts, Ford Models, LA Talent
- Website: ashaleo.com

Asha Leo (born 5 January 1982) is a British fashion model and television presenter of Welsh and Indian descent.

== Career ==
She was discovered at the age of 13, which lead her becoming a model.

Upon moving to America, Leo hosted The Brit List on BBC America. After moving to Los Angeles she hosted red carpet award shows, commenting on celebrity style as well as films and television trivia.

On NBC she has hosted on both Access Hollywood and Access Hollywood Live. Her bi-weekly segment "Access Style Deals" focuses on the fashion trends.

== Personal life ==
Leo grew up in Kingston-upon-Thames and attended The London College of Fashion where she earned a degree in Fashion Promotion, PR, and Journalism and Broadcast. Leo attended Tiffin Girls' School.
