= Tiffin Girls' School =

The Tiffin Girls' School

Location
- Richmond Road; Kingston upon Thames, London, KT2 5PL; England
- 51.425°N 0.303°W

Information
- Type: Grammar Academy
- Motto: Latin: Sapere Aude ("Dare to be Wise")
- Established: 1880; 146 years ago
- Founders: Thomas and John Tiffin
- Department for Education URN: 136615 Tables
- Ofsted: Reports
- Chair of Governors: Sarah Beeching
- Headteacher: Emma Kilburn
- Staff: 72
- Gender: Girls
- Age: 11 to 22
- Enrolment: approx. 1200
- Capacity: 1001
- Houses: Bebbington, Flavell, Nicolle, Orford, Schofield, Watson
- Colours: Blue and white
- Former pupils: Tiffin Old Girls / Tiffin Girls' alumnae
- Website: http://www.tiffingirls.org/

The Tiffin Girls' School is a girls' selective school in Kingston upon Thames, south west London, England; it moved from voluntary aided status to become an academy in 2011.

== History ==
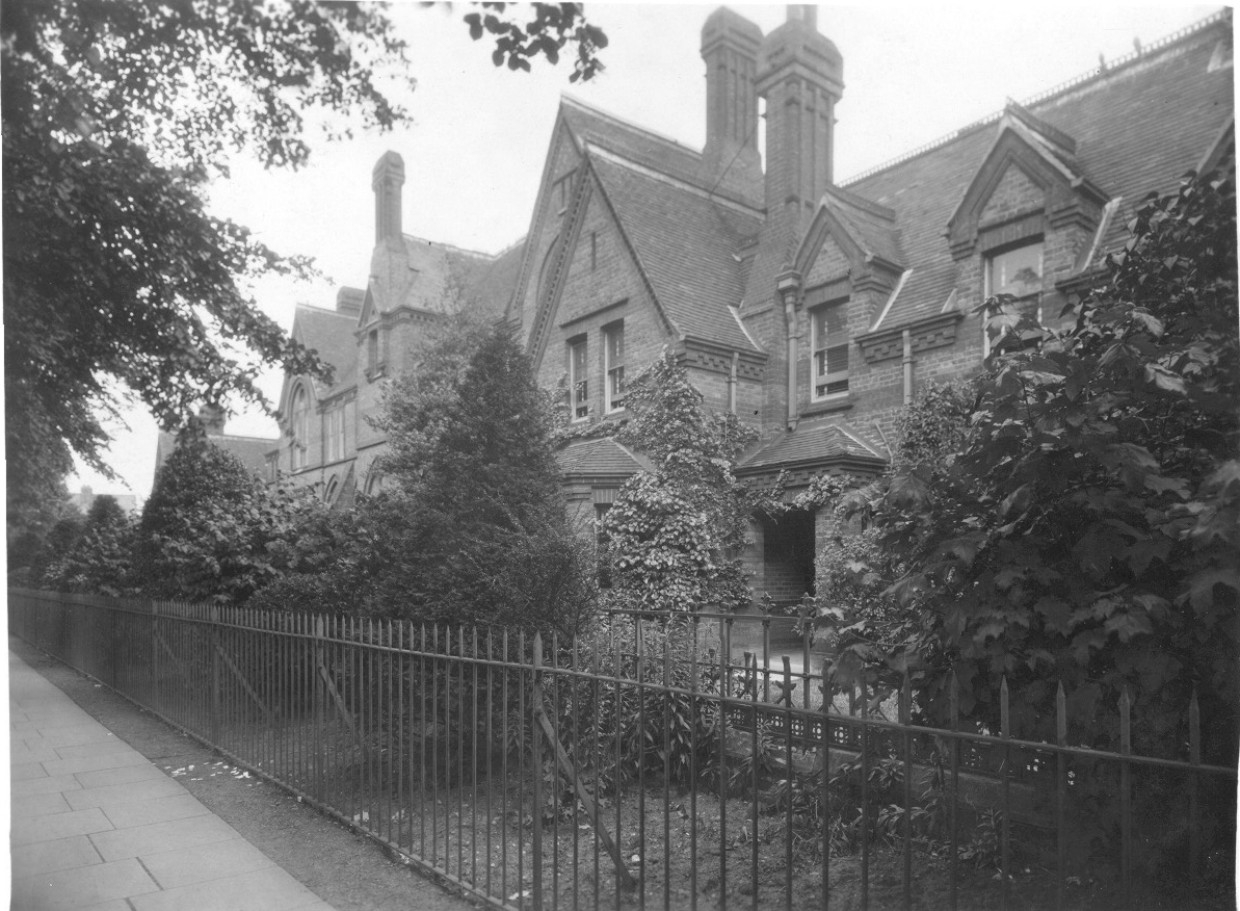
The Tiffin Girls' School old building

The Tiffin name is borrowed from Thomas and John Tiffin, prosperous brewers in the early seventeenth century, who left money in their wills for the education of the poor. The money was first used for scholarships for one or two boys to attend an existing private school but, thanks to investment and donations from other local benefactors, nearly 100 children were benefiting from the charitable fund by the 1820s.

By 1869, when the charity schools had closed and the money was no longer needed by the Public Elementary School, the Trustees proposed to dedicate the Tiffin money exclusively to Kingston Grammar School. The dispute that ensued went on until 1872 when it was ruled that the Grammar School should not receive more than a quarter of the income from charities. In 1874, plans were drawn up for two new schools, a Tiffins' School for boys and one for girls, each to take 150 pupils. The Tiffin Girls' School was originally called The Tiffin's Girls' School, but the name was changed as it caused some confusion.

The single building by "The Fairfield" (now recreational cricket ovals), which housed both schools, was completed in 1879 and opened in 1880. Rhoda Ward Fysh was appointed as the girls' school's first headmistress. After fifty years in a previous building in Richmond Road, the school moved to its present site, also in Richmond Road, in 1987. The building had previously been occupied by The Tudor School which was closed by the local authority in 1986.

In 1999, the school benefited from a £500,000 Sport England Lottery Fund Grant. This, combined with fundraising from the school, enhanced the sports facilities for both school and community use. Improvements included a floodlit all-weather astro turf for hockey, floodlit netball/tennis courts and refurbished changing facilities as well as a community sports development programme for after school, weekends and holidays.

On 15 December 2003, a fire caused by a short circuit due to a leak in the roof burned down a large portion of the main building. The Tiffin Fire Appeal raised a significant amount of money for rebuilding.

The new part of the school was completed in 2006. The new wing was named the Holdsworth Wing after the retired Chair of Governors, Sandra Holdsworth. The construction of a new drama studio was completed in 2007. The school raised money for a new music studio, which opened in September 2009.

The school became an academy on 1 April 2011.

== Present day ==
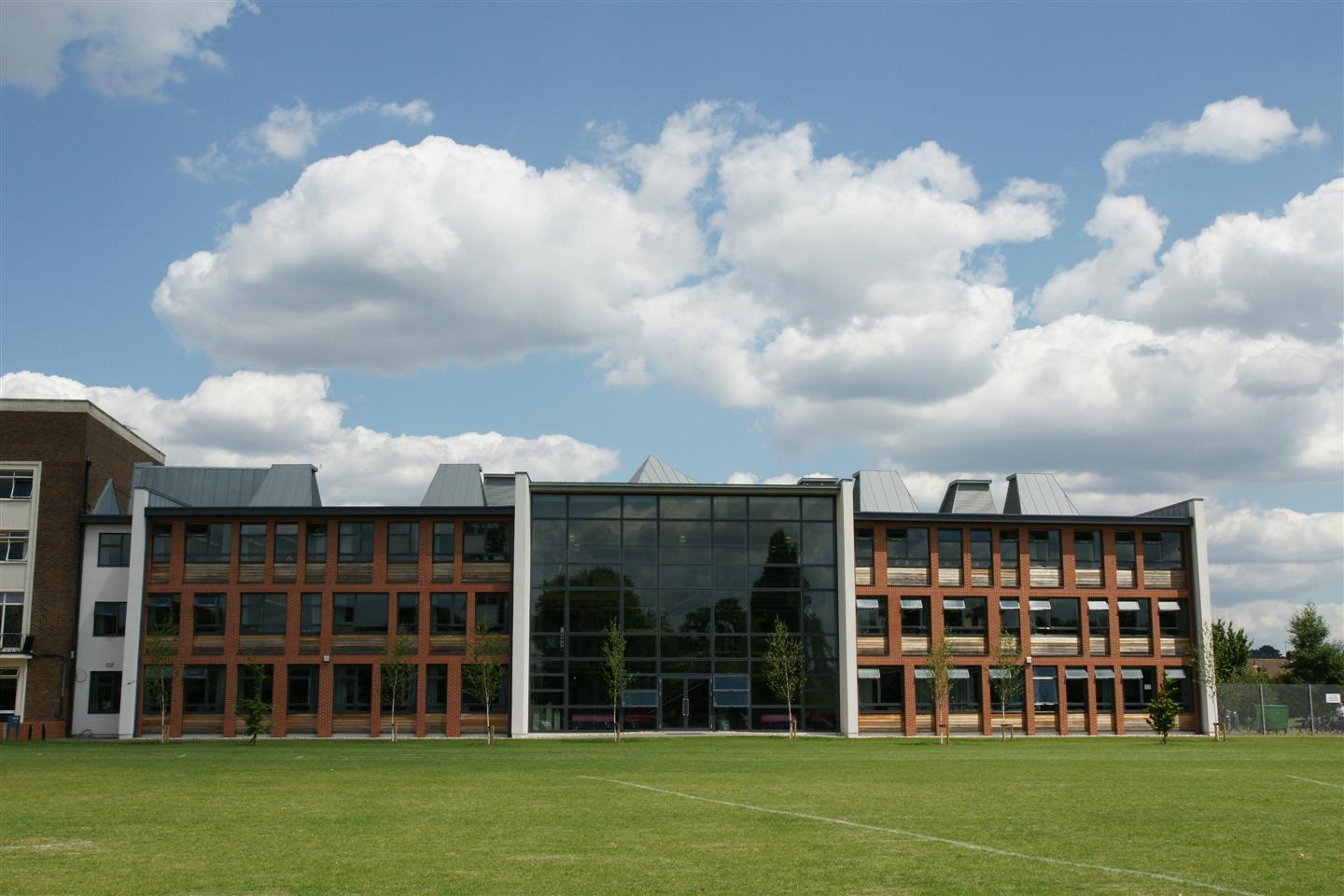
Holdsworth Wing

There are approximately 1,200 pupils aged between 11 and 18, including approximately 300 in the sixth form. They are split into six houses – Bebbington (Red), Flavell (Yellow), Schofield (Blue), Watson (Green), Orford (Orange) and Nicolle (Purple). All are named after former headmistresses of the school.

== Curriculum ==
Pupils in Years 7–9 study Maths, English, Biology, Chemistry, Physics, Religious Studies, Spanish, French, Latin, Design and Technology, Art, Computing, Music, Geography, History, PE and Drama. There is also one period of PSHE/Pastoral.

In Years 10 and 11, pupils continue 10 subjects to GCSE level. All GCSEs are sat at the end of Year 11. English Language, English Literature, Biology, Chemistry, Physics and Maths are compulsory. This leaves four options to be chosen, of which one must be a modern language (French or Spanish). Girls also take core PE lessons and have one period a week for PSHE/Pastoral. The options they have are as follows : Art, Music, DT, Latin, the language which they have not already chosen as part of their compulsory GCSE, Geography, History, Religious Studies, Computer Science, Drama.

In Year 12, pupils choose four subjects to begin their A level studies. Subjects follow A Level specifications with the exception of Music which follows the Pre-U course. At the end of Year 12, girls drop one subject, taking forward three subjects to A level.

== Admissions ==
Entry into the school is by academic selection, using a Mathematics and English test and the school prioritises girls from its catchment area. Prior to 2012, the tests were both verbal and non-verbal reasoning, with a Mathematics and English test being added that year. From 2015 both rounds of tests were in Mathematics and English and the school added further priority to girls with pupil premium funding from its catchment area. 180 children are admitted to the school each year, this number being increased from 150.

== Notable former pupils ==
- Elspeth Attwooll, Lib Dem MEP for Scotland
- Sophie Bray, British field hockey player who competed for Team GB at the 2016 Summer Olympics.
- Alison Cooper, businesswoman, chief executive of Imperial Tobacco
- Jan Etherington, writer and producer
- Lisa Faulkner, actress
- Barbara C. Freeman, author and illustrator
- Jill Gascoigne, actress
- Phyllis Ginger, artist
- Chloe Hayward, fashion model
- Amy Hoggart, comedian and actress
- Kim Ismay, actress
- Asha Leo, model/presenter
- Ingrid Oliver, comedian and actress
- Katherine Parkinson, actress
- Sophy Ridge, Sky News presenter
- Rosianna Halse Rojas, YouTuber
- Lynne Truss, author
- Lorna Watson, comedian and actress
- Sarah Winckless, bronze medal winner at 2004 Olympics in women's double sculls
