= Watson & Oliver =

- Watson & Oliver intertitle
- Genre: Sketch comedy
- Written by: Lorna Watson; Ingrid Oliver; Kevin Cecil; Alex Lowe
- Directed by: Richard Boden; Simon Gibney
- Starring: Lorna Watson; Ingrid Oliver; Adrian Scarborough; Hugo Speer; Rhona Croker; Matthew Earley; Bob Golding; Tom Parry; Daniel Lawrence Taylor
- Country of origin: United Kingdom
- Original language: English
- No. of series: 2
- No. of episodes: 12

Production
- Executive producers: Mark Freeland; Robert Popper
- Producer: Simon London
- Camera setup: Multiple-camera setup
- Running time: 29 minutes

Original release
- Network: BBC Two; BBC HD
- Release: 20 February 2012 – 30 May 2013

Watson & Oliver is a British sketch show starring Lorna Watson and Ingrid Oliver, known for their performances together at the Edinburgh Fringe. The show features a mixture of pre-recorded sketches and material performed in front of a studio audience. It was shown on BBC Two and BBC HD; the first series began on 20 February 2012. A second and final series started on 25 April 2013.

== Production ==
The programme was filmed in front of a live studio audience. It is a co-production between the BBC's in-house comedy department and independent production company Popper Pictures.

== Episodes ==
=== Series 1 (2012) ===
Regular characters included a pair of Georgian ladies, a guard and inmate at a women's prison, Playboy bunnies Candy and April, and Prince William and Kate Middleton reminiscing about their wedding day. Guest stars for this series included John Barrowman, Daniel Rigby, Adrian Scarborough, Sophie Thompson, Felicity Montagu, Daisy Aitkens, Hugo Speer, Colin Salmon and Perry Benson.

Episode	Broadcast
1. Episode One: In the first episode, it emerges that Lorna Watson has a slight issue with timekeeping. We also see Wills and Kate relaxing at home, and visit a typical East End café. John Barrowman drops in for a performance with Ingrid.	Mon 20.02.12
2. Episode Two: This week, the ladies with Absolutely No Sense & Sensibility perform at the pianoforte, and we look inside the offices of the Bad Men.	Mon 27.02.12
3. Episode Three: In this week's episode, the Georgian ladies have Absolutely No Sense or Sensibility whilst picknicking, and a pair of schoolgirls go clothes shopping. Back in the studio, Lorna and Ingrid receive some surprising news from James Bond producer Barbara Broccoli.	Mon 05.03.12
4. Episode Four: The Teenage Girls try to catch the bus home but are distracted by two boys. Meanwhile, Colin Firth is humble, and Julio Iglesias is reunited with his son Enrique for a chat and a song.	Mon 12.03.12
5. Episode Five: Miss Steepes and Miss Rutherford try to gatecrash Brigadier Burnham's Biannual Ball. Candy and April have a photoshoot on a golf course, and Romeo and Juliet is analysed in an English class by the Teenage Girls.	Mon 19.03.12
6. Episode Six: Superhero AlloyMan has problems with his new suit; Fi & Bea are off to Spain; and Sir Thomas and Mr Bridgewater have marriage on their minds. Have Miss Steepes and Miss Rutherford finally caught their prey? Back in the studio, Lorna and Ingrid attempt to put on their own Olympic Opening ceremony.	Mon 26.03.12

=== Series 2 (2013) ===
A guard and inmate at a women's prison, two policewomen and the scholars Fi and Bea are regular characters of this series.

Episode	Broadcast
1. Episode One: A realistic cookery programme shows how to bin your burnt dinner and order a take-away; two policewomen get a bit too musical; a prime minister comes up with the ultimate excuse to duck out of a boring dinner; a homeless girl invites her date back to her bench; a disco at the prison; and there's wall-to-wall cakes and cockney mums in a loving re-creation of Call the Midwife.	Thu 25.04.13
2. Episode Two: This week's sketches include a meeting with a forgetful spy; a supermarket shopping trip with a Brazilian carnival dancer; and details on how to get hold of a proper cup of tea.	Thu 02.05.13
3. Episode Three: Prime Minister Frances invents a war, Susan has a bit of a problem with a wasp, Bea and Fi have a bit of a problem with a Take That calendar and a rodent control operative shows her more sensitive side. A warrior from the future has a warning about tea, and the Kooky Girls, the girls that can sell you anything and like to ride bikes with baskets.	Thu 09.05.13
4. Episode Four: This episode features the agony of a teenage date; the mysterious power of an unfashionable brown dress; and a great new way to stay fit and lose weight - terror. Plus a poodle and a basset hound discuss the finer points of dog shows.	Thu 16.05.13
5. Episode Five: This episode features some very flirty Europeans, the psychology of biscuit eating and a hen night that goes horribly horribly wrong. Plus it looks as if prisoner Pat and warder Jean may be about to part forever.	Thu 23.05.13
6. Episode Six: Three ways to escape a boring conversation; an actress learns how to cry on cue; an author discovers her new erotic novel is too embarrassing to read out loud; and somewhere in Spain a matador and a bull are falling in love.	Thu 30.05.13 @ 10pm

== Reception ==
The first series of Watson & Oliver received mixed reviews. The Daily Telegraph found the show "hugely enjoyable" and said "it has a rare sense of comic mischief that teases but doesn't offend". However, the Radio Times gave a negative review, saying that "on the whole it's pretty poor, with a few thin laughs in a clutch of woefully under-written sketches".

The Daily Mirror gave a mixed review, saying "They’ve got the talent and are both immensely likeable, but what they’re lacking right now is better material." as did The Independent, which found the show's style "old-fashioned" but said "They are both talented comic actresses as well as comedians. A more up-to-date vehicle would help."

The first series' opening episode drew 1.05 million viewers, but the audience shrank to 550,000 viewers by the end of the series.
