= Storage 24 =

2012 film by Johannes Roberts

- Film poster
- Directed by: Johannes Roberts
- Screenplay by: Johannes Roberts; Davie Fairbanks; Marc Small; Noel Clarke
- Story by: Noel Clarke
- Produced by: Manu Kumaran; Noel Clarke
- Starring: Noel Clarke; Colin O'Donoghue; Antonia Campbell-Hughes; Laura Haddock
- Cinematography: Tim Sidell
- Edited by: Martin Brinkler
- Music by: Christian Henson
- Production companies: Unstoppable Entertainment; Big Yellow Films; Medient Entertainment
- Distributed by: Universal Pictures
- Release date: 29 June 2012
- Running time: 87 minutes
- Country: United Kingdom
- Language: English
- Budget: £1.6 million
- Box office: $646,175

Storage 24 is a 2012 British science fiction horror film directed by Johannes Roberts, and co-written by Roberts, Davie Fairbanks, Marc Small, and Noel Clarke from an original idea by Clarke, who also starred in the leading role. The film co-stars Antonia Campbell-Hughes and Colin O'Donoghue, the film follows a group of people become trapped inside a storage facility with a highly unwelcome guest.

Storage 24 was theatrically released in the United Kingdom on 29 June 2012 by Universal Pictures. The film had grossed $646,175 and received mixed reviews from critics, who praised it as entertaining, but criticised its plot and uneven execution.

== Plot ==
A military aircraft crashes in central London, releasing its highly classified contents. Following the crash, a malfunction at the Storage 24 facility causes the security shutters to lock, trapping several people inside: Charlie, his best friend Mark, Charlie's ex-girlfriend Shelley, her best friend Nikki, Nikki's boyfriend Chris, the building receptionist, Jake and a maintenance engineer, Bob. Charlie arrives at the facility with Mark shortly after the incident. However, since the facility's power is intermittently failing and everyone else is forced back together when they realise they cannot leave the building.

Meanwhile, Bob (the electrician) and Jake (the receptionist) are attempting to unlock the shutters by checking the electrical distribution boards in the basement. Bob is attacked and mysteriously killed. Jake flees and hides in an open storage room. Chris chances on him and witnesses him being killed by an alien creature. Looking around, Charlie, Mark, Shelley and Nikki come across Chris huddled in the room, in shock, with blood dripping onto his face from above. From this, they locate Jake's shredded remains above the ceiling panels. As Nikki runs from the room, a middle-aged man grabs her, threatening her with an electric toothbrush. They stun him and tie him up, believing he is the murderer. When he regains consciousness, they learn he is merely an eccentric resident of a nearby storage unit, hiding from his wife. When Chris recovers they learn that a deadly creature of some kind is on the loose, and they are not safe.

Together, they hide themselves in one of the storage rooms as the creature lurks outside. However, Chris runs; the creature catches him and rips out his heart. The group then decides to stay in the unit rented by the man, David, because it is lockable from the inside. David helps them to piece together what must have happened, by showing them the news channels on a collection of televisions he has acquired. Their only hope is to escape from the facility, and to do that they will need the engineer's equipment in the basement. Before they venture there, they decide to use the ventilation ducts in order to search other units for weapons.

Mark and Charlie search several units, but find only a knife, a crowbar, and some fireworks. As they return, the creature breaks through the duct inches from Charlie and Mark abandons him. Mark returns to the group and distributes the weapons, telling them that Charlie is dead. Charlie has somehow escaped the creature, and stumbles into the group; there is a slightly awkward reunion. Heading for the basement, they are confronted by the creature, and David sacrifices himself to give the others time to escape. They split into pairs to search the basement. Charlie and Nikki find the electronic keypad controlling the shutters near Bob's mutilated body. When they return, Mark is alone. He tells them Shelley has been taken by the creature and they must leave immediately. Charlie insists on a rescue attempt and doubles back with Nikki.

In a corridor nearby, Shelley is held captive by the creature. As it prepares to kill her, she stabs it with the knife and runs, but is cornered in a lift. Charlie and Nikki send a walking toy dog rigged with lit fireworks down the hallway. The fireworks explode, allowing Shelley to escape to Charlie. Believing the creature dead, they run to Reception only to find Mark has barred its door with the crowbar. They plead with him; he stares distractedly, leaving them trapped. Charlie kicks the door open, and tries to open the shutters with the keypad. Just then the creature breaks through the wall behind Mark, and kills him. With Nikki's aid, Charlie kills the creature by thrusting the crowbar through its abdomen and says: 'I Just want to go home.'

Charlie finally releases the security shutters, and the trio emerge into the street. Shelley apologises and Charlie accepts the break-up. They go their separate ways. London is ablaze, under heavy attack from alien spaceships. The film ends abruptly.

== Cast ==
- Noel Clarke as Charlie
- Colin O'Donoghue as Mark
- Antonia Campbell-Hughes as Shelley
- Laura Haddock as Nikki
- Jamie Thomas King as Chris
- Alex Price as Jake
- Ned Dennehy as David
- Geoff Bell as Bob
- Ruth Gemmell as Ruth
- Davie Fairbanks as Greg
- Amy Pemberton as Lucy
- Robert Freeman as the Alien

== Reception ==
=== Critical response ===
On Rotten Tomatoes, the film has a rating of 40% based on 35 reviews, with a rating of 4.9/10. On Metacritic, the film has a score of 52 out of 100, based on reviews from six critics.

Jeremy Clarke from The Guardian said "Johannes Roberts' warehouse-set monster flick is unexpectedly entertaining", giving the film four stars out of five. Kim Newman from Empire gave the film three stars out of five and called it "a superior British horror sci-fi."

=== Box office ===
Storage 24 grossed $689,652 worldwide. It entered the UK chart at number 13, making $372,153. In Turkey it entered at number 7 in the charts and in Hong Kong it entered at number 10. In the US, it was released for one day, on one screen, making $72, before being released on DVD and VOD through Magnolia.
