= Ingrid Oliver =

British comedian and actress (born 1977)

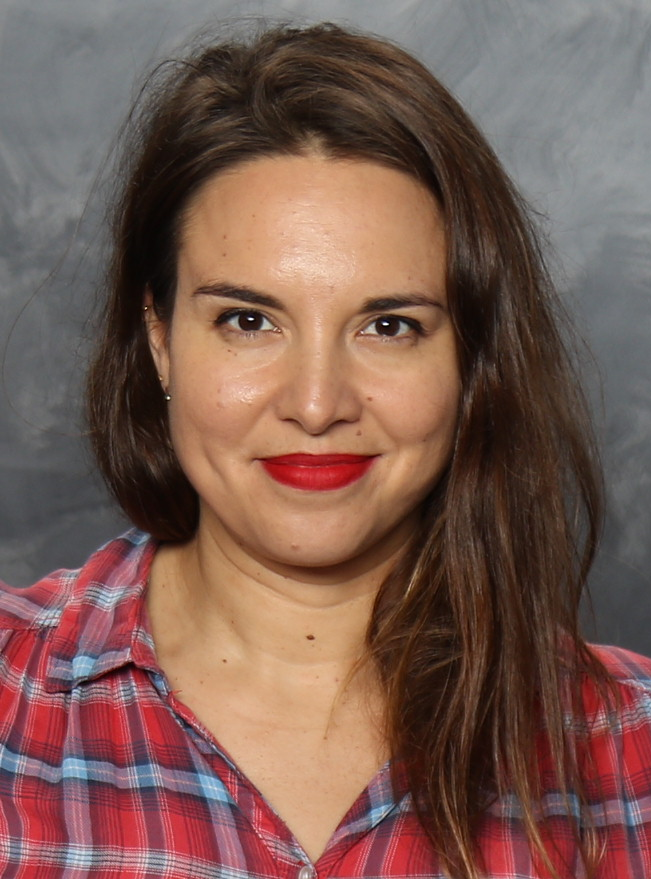
- Oliver at the 2017 Super Retrocon
- Born: 25 February 1977 (age 49)
- Citizenship: United Kingdom; Germany
- Education: New College, Oxford
- Occupations: Actress; comedian; writer
- Years active: 2005–present
- Spouse: Richard Osman (m. 2022)
- Mother: Jo Gideon

Ingrid Oliver (born 25 February 1977) is a British actress and comedian, and one half of the comic double act Watson & Oliver. She played Petronella Osgood, a supporting character in the BBC television series Doctor Who.

== Career ==
Oliver and her comedy partner Lorna Watson met at Tiffin Girls' School in Kingston upon Thames. She then read modern languages at New College, Oxford. In September 2005, Watson and Oliver performed their first show together at the Canal Cafe Theatre in London. They took sell-out shows to Edinburgh Festival Fringe in 2006 and 2007.

Oliver has performed in various radio and television programmes, including Doc Martin, The Penny Dreadfuls' radio series The Penny Dreadfuls Present... The Brothers Faversham and the radio series Another Case of Milton Jones. She played the part of Natalie in Peep Show on Channel 4.

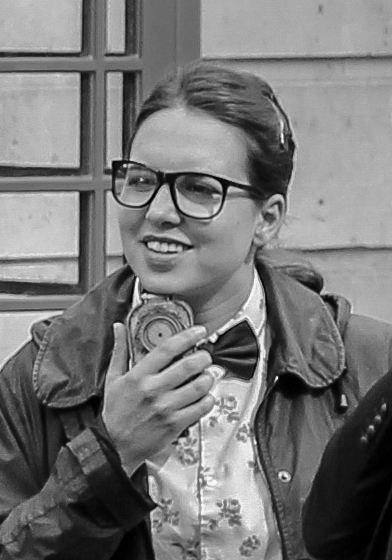
Oliver on the set of Doctor Who in Cardiff in 2014

She appears in the film Angus, Thongs and Perfect Snogging as Miss Stamp, and in early 2009 could be seen in Channel 4's sitcom Plus One.

In 2010, Oliver played Mimi Throckmorton in Material Girl on BBC One, alongside Lenora Crichlow and Dervla Kirwan. In 2012, she appeared on Let's Dance For Sport Relief with comedy partner Lorna Watson, dancing Boléro, famously used by Torvill and Dean. The following year, she appeared in the first episode of The Great Comic Relief Bake Off and was named as 'Star Baker'. The same year, she appeared in the 50th anniversary special of Doctor Who, "The Day of the Doctor", as Petronella Osgood. She reprised the role in the episodes "Death in Heaven", "The Zygon Invasion", and "The Zygon Inversion"; UNIT, an audio drama spinoff series produced by Big Finish Productions; and Doctor Who: Redacted, a BBC radio drama spin-off series.

In 2024, Oliver played a supporting role in Sweetpea on Sky Atlantic.

In 2025, Oliver was one of the judges of the 'Published Novel' category of the Comedy Women in Print Prize.

== Personal life ==
Oliver was born to a German father and English mother. Her grandfather, Eric Gideon, was a D-Day veteran who died in 2017, shortly after receiving the Légion d'Honneur for his service to France during the war. Her mother is former Conservative MP Jo Gideon, who became the Member of Parliament (MP) for Stoke-on-Trent Central in 2019. Oliver has British and German nationality.

She began a relationship with Richard Osman in 2020; they became engaged in May 2022 and married in December 2022. They met when she was a contestant on TV celebrity quiz show Richard Osman's House of Games.

== Filmography ==
=== Film ===
Year	Title	Role	Notes
2008	Angus, Thongs and Perfect Snogging	Mrs. Stamp	
2017	You, Me and Him	Lily	
2019	The Hustle	Brigitte Desjardins	
2019	Last Christmas	Police Woman Crowley	
2025	The Thursday Murder Club	Joanna	

=== Television ===
Year	Title	Role	Notes
2005	Footprints in the Snow	Back-Up Organiser	TV film
2005	Doc Martin	Radio Technician	Episode: "Aromatherapy"
2006	Vital Signs	Mother #2	Episode #1.2
2006	Now the Weather	Unknown	Unaired Pilot
2007	Biffovision	Mrs. Peggy	TV film
2007	Watson & Oliver: The Movie	Various characters	TV film; also writer
2007	Comedy Showcase	Rebecca Black	Episode: "Plus One"
2008	The Gym	Miriam	1 episode
2008	Peep Show	Natalie	Episode: "Jeremy's Mummy"
2008	Tonightly	Ingrid	Episode #1.1
2008	The Wrong Door	Various characters	6 episodes; also writer
2009	Plus One	Rebecca Black	5 episodes
2009	The Fixer	Sadie	Episode #2.4
2010	The Persuationists	Harriet	Episode: "The Australianess"
2010	Material Girl	Mimi Throckmorton	6 episodes
2011	Twenty Twelve	Assistant producer of The Today Programme	Episode #1.6
2011	Lead Balloon	Jenny	Episode: "Pig"
2012–2013	Watson & Oliver	Various characters	12 episodes; also writer
2012–2016	The Increasingly Poor Decisions of Todd Margaret	Yancy McPickles/Vanessa Blojabditz	4 episodes
2013–2015	Doctor Who	Petronella Osgood	4 episodes
2014	GameFace	Clare	Episode: "Pilot"
2016	Plebs	Camilla	Episode: "Justin Junior"
2017	The Magicians	Hudson River Dragon (voice)	Episode: "The Rattening"
2019	Silent Witness	DI Briggs	2 episodes
2019	Defending the Guilty	Fiona	3 episodes
2021	The Watch	Doctor Cruces	4 episodes
2023	Beyond Paradise	Cassie Parker	Episode #1.4
2024	Father Brown	Gaynor Garfield	Episode: "The Forensic Nun"
2024	Sweetpea	D.I. Diana St. John	4 episodes
2026	Run Away	Yvonne Previdi	8 episodes
2026	Rivals	Clara	1 episode

=== Stage ===
Year	Title	Role	Venue	Notes
Unknown	Goethe's Faust	Gretchen	St. John's College Theatre	
Unknown	King Lear	Cordelia	Tabard Theatre	
Unknown	Heartbreak House	Hesione Hushabye	Tabard Theatre	
Unknown	Anatol	Annie	Tabard Theatre	
2003	Revolving Door	Kelly	Theatro Technis	
2003	Butterflies Are Free	Florence Baker	Vienna's English Theatre	
2003	Loveplay	Various characters	Finborough Theatre	
2004	Eskimo Sisters	Mo	Camden People's Theatre	
2006	The Shelter	Angela Trumpet	Lawrence Batley Theatre	
2015	Harvey	Myrtle Mae Simmons	Birmingham Repertory Theatre	
2017	Ingrid Oliver: Speech!	Various characters	Edinburgh Festival Fringe	One-woman show

=== Video games ===
Year	Title	Role
2013	Company of Heroes 2	Unknown
2018	Doctor Who Infinity: The Dalek Invasion of Time	Petronella Osgood (voice)
2019	Doctor Who Infinity: The Horror of Flat Holm	Petronella Osgood (voice)
2021	Doctor Who: The Lonely Assassins	Petronella Osgood

=== Radio ===
Year	Title	Role	Production	Notes
2007–2012	The Castle	Lady Charlotte	BBC Radio 4 (series 1–3)	24 episodes
2007–2012	The Castle	Lady Charlotte	BBC Radio 4 Extra (series 4)	24 episodes
2008	The Brothers Faversham	Alexandra Faversham	BBC Radio 7	4 episodes
2008	More Brothers Faversham	Alexandra Faversham	BBC Radio 7	4 episodes
2009	Cavity	Kirsty	BBC Radio 4	
2013	ElvenQuest	Penthiselea	BBC Radio 4	6 episodes
2014	The Architects	Sarah	BBC Radio 4	4 episodes
2014	Men About The House	Eve Feevis	BBC Radio 4	Pilot
2015	A Trespasser's Guide to The Classics	Emma	BBC Radio 4	Episode: "The Rat-Catchers of Yonville"
2019–2022	Party's Over	Christine Tobin	BBC Radio 4	12 episodes
2021	The Attendant	Denise/Evil Denise	BBC Radio 4	Episode: "Sci-Fi"
