= Alex Price =

British actor (born 1985)

- Born: 8 May 1985 (age 41); Manchester, England, UK
- Occupation: Actor
- Years active: 2000–present
- Height: 6 ft 1 in (1.85 m)
- Children: 1

Alex Price (born 8 May 1985) is a British actor who has appeared in various television programmes including Being Human, Merlin and Doctor Who. He starred in feature-length films, such as A Horse with No Name, and in a variety of short films.

From 2013 to 2022, he played Sid Carter, one of the main characters in the television series Father Brown. Price was praised by critics for his performance of Proteus in the television series Penny Dreadful. He has appeared in a vast number of stage productions like Is Everyone OK? (Nabokov Touring Project), Colourings (Old Red Lion), The Duchess of Malfi (National Theatre Studio), and Birdland (Royal Court Theatre). In 2016, he was cast as Draco Malfoy in the Harry Potter play, Harry Potter and the Cursed Child. Most recently he appeared in The Capture, a BBC drama about deep fake technology.

== Personal life ==
Alex Price has a younger sister and is married and has a son (2011).

== Television ==
Year	Title	Format	Role	Notes
2008	Casualty	Television series	Daniel Freed	1 episode
2009	Being Human	Television series	Gilbert	1 episode
2009	Merlin	Television series	Sir William of Daira	1 episode
2009	Merlin: Secrets and Magic	Documentary series	Himself	1 episode
2009	Mouth to Mouth	Television series	Tyler	6 episodes
2010	Doctors	Television series	Sam Griffin	1 episode
2010	Doctor Who "The Vampires of Venice"	Television series	Francesco	1 episode
2010	Doctor Who Confidential	Documentary series	Narrator	13 episodes
2010	Going Postal	Television series	Roger	
2010	Lewis	"Falling Darkness"	Victor Clerval	S4:E4
2012	Above Suspicion: Silent Scream	Television series	Dan Hutchkins	3 episodes
2012	Vera: Sandancers	Television series	Lance Corporal "Budgie" O'Connor	
2013–16	Father Brown	Television series	Sid Carter	4 series As regular
2017–2020	Father Brown	Television series	Sid Carter	4 episodes guest star
2022	Father Brown	Television series	Sid Carter	6 episodes as regular cast
2014–15	Penny Dreadful	Television series	Proteus	4 episodes
2016	Beowulf: Return to the Shieldlands	Television series	Koll	
2016	Doctor Thorne	Television series	Reverend Caleb Oriel	

== Film ==
Year	Title	Format	Role
2006	Internal	Film	Extra
2007	Saturday 3pm	Film	Patrick
2007	Fervour	Film	Hans
2008	Clubbed	Film	Pluto
2010	A Horse with No Name	Film	Vince Vinyl
2010	Eric & Ernie	Film	Nigel
2012	Storage 24	Film	Jake

== Theatre ==
Year	Title	Role	Theatre	Location
2008	Colourings	Mark	Old Red Lion Theatre	London, United Kingdom
2010	Bingo	Son	Minerva Studio	Chichester, United Kingdom
2011	Beautiful Thing	Tony	Royal Exchange Theatre	Manchester, United Kingdom
2011	Electra	Orestes	Gate Theatre	London, United Kingdom
2012	Bingo	Son	Young Vic	London, United Kingdom
2013	Before the Party	David	Almeida Theatre	London, United Kingdom
2014	Birdland	Johnny	Royal Court Theatre	London, United Kingdom
2016–2017	Harry Potter and the Cursed Child	Draco Malfoy	Palace Theatre	London, United Kingdom
2018	Harry Potter and the Cursed Child	Draco Malfoy	Lyric Theatre	New York City, United States
