= Lorna Watson =

British comedian, TV presenter (born 1977)

- Born: 3 October 1977 (age 48); North London, England
- Occupations: Comedian, actor, television presenter
- Years active: 2001–present

Lorna Watson (born 3 October 1977) is a British comedian, actress, and television presenter. She was one of the presenters of Spy School. Her acting roles include starring in Sister Boniface Mysteries and various characters in television sketch shows Rush Hour, The Wrong Door, and Watson & Oliver with comedy partner Ingrid Oliver.

== Early life and career ==
Watson was born in North London, England, and her initial appearances were during 2001–2002 in the comedy entertainment TV series Gatecrashers.

Among her early performances, in 2007 Watson appeared as Milly in series 2, episode 1, "The Work Outing", of The IT Crowd, and as Svetlana in the comedy drama TV movie Christmas at the Riviera.

In March 2012 she appeared on Let's Dance for Sport Relief with Ingrid Oliver; they danced to Ravel's Boléro. The two met at Tiffin Girls' School in Kingston upon Thames. Her influences are French & Saunders and Fry & Laurie.

In 2013, Watson appeared as Sister Boniface in the Father Brown episode "The Bride of Christ" and took part in a special series of The Great British Bake Off. In 2015, she starred in a special episode of Horrible Histories in which she played Boudicca. She also played a one-off character called 'Thingy' in the "Fashion Phonies" episode of CBBC's Hotel Trubble.

She appeared as Dorothy Eatbins in 13 episodes of the Animal TV miniseries in 2018.

In January 2020, it was announced that Watson would be reprising her Sister Boniface role for a new series called Sister Boniface Mysteries, with a ten-episode first series premiering on the streaming service BritBox. The second series aired in 2023 with filming for a third series beginning in June for broadcast in 2024, with Watson also recording a return to Father Brown.

Watson is the author of the 2024 children's book Rabbit on the Rampage published by Walker Books.

She guest starred as Felicity Crawford in Midsomer Murders season 25, episode 4, "Top of the Class", in 2025.
