= List of The Sandbaggers characters =

This is a list of the main and recurring fictional characters from the Yorkshire Television espionage series, The Sandbaggers.

== Main characters ==
=== Neil Burnside ===
A career intelligence officer, Burnside is Director of Operations ("D-Ops") of SIS, a former Sandbagger, and an ex-Royal Marines officer. At the beginning of the series, Burnside has been in his position "less than six months." He is devious, manipulative, cynical, aggressive and independent-minded, putting him frequently in conflict with others. He is devoted to the preservation of Britain's national security, but while battling the KGB, his main sources of antagonism are the people on his side: superiors in SIS, whom he alternately considers too cautious or too reckless; self-serving politicians who grant or withhold permission for his covert operations; territory-hungry MI5 officers; and entrenched civil servants. Coming from a working-class background, he resents the fact that most of his superiors got their positions through their middle- and upperclass pedigree. A heavy drinker while a Sandbagger, Burnside stopped drinking alcohol shortly after becoming D-Ops.

His single-minded devotion to his job cost him his marriage before the start of the series, though he maintains a close relationship with his former father-in-law, Sir Geoffrey Wellingham, the Permanent Undersecretary of State at the Foreign and Commonwealth Office. This provides him a conduit through which to bypass both the Deputy Chief of SIS and C himself. His one attempt at a romantic relationship is with Laura Dickens, a Sandbagger recruit in the first series; aside from this, Burnside's life outside SIS is all but non-existent.

The series begins roughly six months after Burnside has become Director of Operations. Fiercely protective of his agents, Burnside tries to keep them from being abused by others in power, despite the risks inherent in their profession. He is played by Roy Marsden.

=== Willie Caine ===
Head of the Special Operations Section ("Sandbagger One"), Willie Caine was a sergeant in the Parachute Regiment and, according to Burnside, is the best operative of his kind in the world. Caine and Burnside were Sandbaggers together before the latter's promotion; perhaps because of this former relationship, Caine is not afraid to speak his mind nor to openly differ with Burnside, but is steadfastly loyal to him. Although he dislikes both violence and guns, he is prepared to use them when necessary; he also shows himself on a number of occasions to be willing to risk his life, both for SIS and for Burnside personally. Besides Burnside, Caine is the only character who appears in every episode of the series; he is played by Ray Lonnen.

=== Mike Wallace ===
Introduced as "Sandbagger Three" in the first episode of the second series, Wallace quickly becomes "Sandbagger Two" after the death of fellow Sandbagger Tom Elliott; he remains Sandbagger Two for the remainder of the series, the longest Sandbagger tenure after Willie Caine. A fluent French speaker, Wallace develops from new recruit to seasoned veteran over the second and third series, even successfully undertaking a dangerous mission to rescue a wounded CIA operative trapped in Sukhumi (then part of the USSR). Burnside puts his career on the line to protect Wallace from a vengeful station chief in the second series episode "A Question of Loyalty". He is played by Michael Cashman.

=== Sir James Greenley ===
Greenley is the Head of SIS, code-named "C", when the series begins, and has been in the job only "a short time." A diplomat by training, Greenley is initially treated with suspicion by Burnside. Over the course of the first two series, Burnside develops trust in and an affection for Greenley, who has the difficult task of balancing political as well as security concerns. Greenley becomes an almost paternal figure to Burnside. While Greenley respects Burside's expertise and always considers his opinions seriously, Greenley is also firm in his decisions and does not tolerate Burnside's insubordination. He retires at the end of the second series as a result of angina, and Burnside is disappointed to see him replaced by the less benevolent John Tower Gibbs (Dennis Burgess), who remains C for the rest of the series. Greenley often wears the crested tie of Merton College, Oxford. He is played by Richard Vernon.

=== Sir Geoffrey Wellingham ===
Sir Geoffrey Wellingham, KCMG, DSC is the Permanent Undersecretary of State at the Foreign and Commonwealth Office that oversees SIS. As Burnside's former father-in-law, he is Burnside's contact within Whitehall, and the two often share information and use each other. This avenue of communication is somewhat outside regular channels, and although it can be useful for both Burnside and SIS, the two men occasionally become adversaries when their agendas differ. Due to his background, experience, and position, Wellingham can be a formidable opponent for Burnside, and reminds him of that more than once. Wellingham wears the tie of the Royal Engineers frequently. He appears in all but two episodes in the series and is played by Alan MacNaughtan.

=== Matthew Peele ===
The Deputy Head of SIS, former Head of Hong Kong Station and, like Burnside, a career intelligence officer. Unlike Burnside, Peele has little field experience and is more concerned with avoiding in-fighting with MI5, keeping politicians happy, and furthering his ambitions to higher rank. As a result, Peele often stands against what he sees as Burnside's recklessness, contempt for the proper chain of command, and lack of political tact. He is disliked by his subordinates and considered weak-willed, aloof, and easily manipulated, but on several occasions proves himself just as committed to the security of Britain as Burnside; their relationship evolves over the course of the series to one of mutual respect (if still antagonistic). Although his military service is never discussed, Peel wears a Royal Artillery tie occasionally. Peele appears in all but two episodes and is played by Jerome Willis.

=== John Tower Gibbs ===
Introduced in the last episode of the second series ("Operation Kingmaker"), John Tower Gibbs replaces Sir James Greenley as C and remains in that capacity until the end of the series. Gibbs is a career intelligence officer, former head of the Washington and Bonn stations and working with the Joint Intelligence Committee when he is appointed C. He and Burnside have an antagonistic relationship from the start, stemming from an altercation they had when Burnside was a Sandbagger and Gibbs was head of Bonn station. Unlike his predecessor, who called Burnside "Neil", Gibbs refers to Burnside only by his surname, disapproves of his methods, and is suspicious of the special relationship with the CIA, preferring to see it phased out. For his part, Burnside views Gibbs as a tyrant who will stifle his (Burnside's) ability to run his directorate. They clash throughout the third series, but in one episode where Burnside is on leave and Caine is Acting D-Ops, Caine and Gibbs work very well together. Gibbs is seen most often wearing the green tie of the Intelligence Corps, though occasionally he wears a crested University of Oxford tie. Gibbs is played by Dennis Burgess.

=== Jeff Ross ===
The head of the CIA's London station, Ross is Burnside's confidant, connection to the CIA, and closest, if not only, friend. The two often have lunch and work together to preserve the "special relationship" between the CIA and SIS, and Ross takes an interest in Burnside's (non-existent) personal life. The close relationship between the two does not prevent Ross from using Burnside and SIS on at least one occasion for his own ends; when Ross cons Burnside in an attempt to use SIS to head off an MI5 investigation into an American general, Burnside, feeling betrayed, terminates their friendship. However, they reconcile shortly afterwards and remain friends for the remainder of the series. Ross is played by Bob Sherman.

=== Edward Tyler ===
Director of Intelligence (D-Int) for SIS, Tyler appears in the second series and the first two episodes of the third. He and Burnside have a friendly relationship of mutual respect; Burnside considers Tyler the best D-Int he's ever known, and Tyler offers Burnside whatever help he can in operations.

In the episode "To Hell with Justice", Tyler is revealed to have been a double agent for 23 years. He asks the KGB to lift him in Malta, but leaves a trail for SIS to follow and stop the lift. Burnside arrives, intending (against direct orders from C) to kill him. Rather than put his friend through such an ordeal, Tyler calmly dies by suicide with a cyanide pill.

He is played by Peter Laird.

=== Laura Dickens ===
After the deaths, in quick succession, of Sandbaggers Two and Three (Jake Landy and Alan Denson) in the third episode of the first series, Laura Dickens (Diane Keen) is recruited from the MI6 training school, the first woman ever to join the Sandbaggers, despite her opposition to special operations and almost immediate antagonism with Burnside. She initially views the Sandbaggers, and other such units around the world, as playing "cowboys and Indians" and perpetuating conflicts between countries, in particular between East and West. However, she slowly warms to both the Sandbaggers and Burnside personally, and the two begin a romantic relationship, albeit a complicated one due to psychological trauma in her past. She is killed in the final episode of the first series on a dangerous mission to East Berlin.

=== Other characters ===
Other Sandbaggers who appear only briefly are Jake Landy (David Glyder) and Alan Denson (Steven Grives), both killed in the third episode of the first series, and Tom Elliot (David Beames), killed in the first episode of the second series. Burnside's capable and fiercely loyal personal assistant, Diane Lawler (Elizabeth Bennett), retires at the end of the second series and is replaced by Marianne Straker (Sue Holderness), who stays with Burnside throughout the third series. Karen Milner (Jana Sheldon) is a CIA field officer who reports to Jeff Ross and sometimes works alongside one or more of the Sandbaggers; she is only seen in the second series.

After Tyler's suicide, he is replaced as D-Int by Paul Dalgetty (David Robb), an arrogant and considerably less capable officer who has a completely antagonistic relationship with Burnside. Dalgetty openly maneuvers to replace Burnside as D-Ops, going so far as to hide intelligence communiqués from Burnside in order to manipulate Gibbs and Peele, but at the end of the series, he remains D-Int.

== Bibliography ==
- Mackintosh, Ian. (1978). The Sandbaggers. Corgi Childrens.
