= Diana Coupland =

British actress (1928–2006)

- Coupland c. 1973
- Born: Betty Diana Coupland; 5 March 1928; Leeds, West Riding of Yorkshire, England
- Died: 10 November 2006 (aged 78); Coventry, England
- Other names: Diana Betty Norman; Diana Betty Miller
- Occupation: Actress
- Years active: 1943–2006
- Spouses: Monty Norman (m. 1956; div. 1975); Marc Miller (m. 1980)
- Children: 1

Diana Betty Miller (née Coupland; 5 March 1928 – 10 November 2006) was an English actress and singer, best remembered for her role, which she played from 1971 to 1976, in the sitcom Bless This House, as Jean Abbott, wife of Sid James's character Sid.

== Early life ==
Coupland was born in Leeds, West Riding of Yorkshire in 1928, the only child of Elsie (née Beck) and Denis Coupland. She originally wanted to be a ballet dancer but could not fulfil this ambition, owing to a horse-riding accident. Her music career began when she was 15; Barney Colehan, a BBC producer, heard her sing and invited her onto one of his radio shows.

By the time she reached the age of 18, she was singing full-time at the Mecca Locarno in Leeds, and the following year, moved to London with her parents, where she became a resident singer at Mecca's Tottenham Court Road ballroom. Coupland became a leading singer of the 1940s and 1950s, working at the Dorchester Hotel and the Savoy Hotel.

== Career ==
Coupland serenades the opening scene of the film Flannelfoot (1953) in which she featured as a nightclub singer. In 1959, she was unexpectedly cast by Joan Littlewood as Sally in the Theatre Workshop musical Make Me An Offer, and soon appeared in West End shows such as Gigi and Not Now, Darling.

She made her television debut in a 1961 episode of Emergency – Ward 10. Her other early roles were in Dixon of Dock Green, Maigret, The Wednesday Play, Softly, Softly and Z-Cars. After playing a mother in Please Sir! and the Siberian wife in Mel Brooks's film The Twelve Chairs (1970), she was cast as Jean Abbott, the long-suffering wife of Sid James's character, in Bless This House, which began its run in February 1971. She reprised the role in the 1972 feature film, and continued in the role until James died in 1976. She appeared in several other films, including The Millionairess (1960), The Family Way (1966), Charlie Bubbles (1967), Spring and Port Wine (1970), The Rise and Rise of Michael Rimmer (1970), The Best Pair of Legs in the Business (1972) and Operation Daybreak (1975).

She also dubbed the singing voices of actresses who could not sing, including Lana Turner in Betrayed, and provided the demo for Ursula Andress's performance of the song "Underneath the Mango Tree" in the first James Bond film Dr. No, her demo performance features in an earlier scene where Bond listens to a phonograph. She gave up professional singing in the 1960s.

During the late 1970s and 1980s, Coupland appeared in Wilde Alliance, Triangle, Dickens of London and Juliet Bravo. Her casting in Triangle occurred after the death of the actor originally due to play the owner of the shipping line. She had been on the set with her husband, a director on the programme, and was offered the part. She appeared in an episode of One Foot in the Grave in 1992, and in 2000 had a six-week role as Maureen Carter in EastEnders. Following this, Coupland appeared in Doctors, Casualty and in 2005 Rose and Maloney, her final television appearance.

== Personal life ==
Coupland married twice. Her first husband was composer Monty Norman whom she married in May 1956 at the St John's Liberal Synagogue after converting to Judaism. They divorced after 20 years of marriage, having had one daughter. In 2001, she gave evidence in a High Court case after her former husband sued The Sunday Times following a 1997 article suggesting that Norman had falsely taken credit and royalties for the James Bond theme music, which was claimed actually to have been written by John Barry. Coupland described the article as "blatantly untrue"; Norman was awarded £30,000. She married, secondly, to Marc Miller, a producer, in 1980.

== Death ==
Coupland, who was a patron of National Lupus UK, died at the University Hospital in Coventry in November 2006, aged 78, after failing to recover following an operation to resolve long-term heart problems.

== Filmography ==
Year	Title	Role	Notes
1953	Flannelfoot	The Singer	
1960	The Millionairess	Nurse	
1964	Redcap	Iris Pearson	
1966	The Family Way	Mrs. Ross	
1968	Charlie Bubbles	Maud	
1970	Spring and Port Wine	Daisy Crompton	
1970	The Twelve Chairs	Madam Bruns	
1970	The Rise and Rise of Michael Rimmer	Mrs. Spimm	
1972	Bless This House	Jean Abbot	
1973	The Best Pair of Legs in the Business	Mary Sheridan	
1975	Operation Daybreak	Aunt Marie	
2001	Another Life	Mrs. Lester	
