= The Sandbaggers =

British spy drama television series

- Genre: Spy drama
- Created by: Ian Mackintosh
- Developed by: Ian Mackintosh
- Starring: Roy Marsden; Richard Vernon; Ray Lonnen; Alan MacNaughtan; Elizabeth Bennett; Jerome Willis; Bob Sherman; Diane Keen; Dennis Burgess; Michael Cashman
- Theme music composer: Roy Budd
- Country of origin: United Kingdom
- Original language: English
- No. of series: 3
- No. of episodes: 20

Production
- Executive producer: David Cunliffe
- Producer: Michael Ferguson
- Running time: approx. 50 minutes
- Production company: Yorkshire Television

Original release
- Network: ITV
- Release: 18 September 1978 – 28 July 1980

The Sandbaggers is a British spy thriller television series created by Ian Mackintosh, about men and women on the front lines of the Cold War. Set contemporaneously with its original broadcast on ITV from 1978 to 1980, The Sandbaggers examines the effect of espionage on the personal and professional lives of British intelligence officers and their American colleagues. All but three of the 20 episodes were written by Mackintosh, who disappeared in 1979 during production. The series was produced in Leeds by Yorkshire Television.

== Premise ==
Neil Burnside (Roy Marsden) is director of operations (D/Ops) in Britain's Secret Intelligence Service (SIS). The series refers to the service as SIS rather than the more colloquial MI6, though reference is often made to MI5, the UK's domestic intelligence service. Burnside oversees a small, elite group of intelligence officers, the Special Operations Section, nicknamed "Sandbaggers", composed of highly trained operatives whose missions tend to be politically sensitive or particularly vital to UK security.

In many episodes, the primary antagonists are not foreign operatives but rather the UK government and the bureaucracy of SIS itself, as Burnside struggles to operate his directorate in the face of budget cuts and what he believes to be unwarranted interference. A continuing theme of the series is the so-called "special relationship" between SIS and America's Central Intelligence Agency (CIA) and the UK-USA Agreement, which Burnside goes to great lengths to preserve.

== Series creator ==
The Sandbaggers was created by Ian Mackintosh, a Scottish former naval officer turned television writer, who had achieved success with the BBC television series Warship. He wrote all the episodes of the first two series of The Sandbaggers. In July 1979, during the shooting of the third series, he and his girlfriend were declared lost at sea after their single-engine aircraft went missing over the Pacific Ocean near Alaska, following a radioed call for help. Some details surrounding their disappearance caused speculation about what occurred, including their stop at an abandoned United States Air Force base and the fact the plane crashed in the small area not covered by US or Soviet radar.

Mackintosh disappeared after he had written four scripts for the third series, so other writers were called in to bring the episode count up to seven. The Sandbaggers ends on an unresolved cliffhanger because the producers decided no one else could write the series as well as Mackintosh and chose not to continue it in his absence. Ray Lonnen, who played Sandbagger Willie Caine, indicated in correspondence with fans that there were plans for a follow-up season in which his character, using a wheelchair, had taken over Burnside's role as Director of Special Operations. As Lonnen was the only cast or production team member to state knowledge of this fourth season storyline, it is unclear if this was the actual storyline planned or an attempt at humour by Lonnen.

Because of the atmosphere of authenticity that the scripts evoked and the liberal use of "spook" jargon, there has been speculation that Mackintosh might have been a former operative of SIS or had, at least, contact with the espionage community. This has extended to speculation that his disappearance was not an accident, and/or was a consequence of a secret mission he was undertaking. There is a possibility that Mackintosh may have been involved in intelligence operations when in the Royal Navy, but no conclusive evidence has surfaced. When asked, Mackintosh himself was always coy about whether he had been a spy.

Whether or not Mackintosh had experience in espionage, the structure of the SIS depicted in The Sandbaggers is perhaps closer to the CIA than the SIS. There is no formal section of the SIS known as the Special Operations Section, as far as is publicly known, and there is no intelligence unit known as the Sandbaggers. However, the departures from accuracy in the show may have been deliberate, to avoid problems with the SIS under the Official Secrets Act. Lonnen mentioned in an interview that one episode in the second series was vetoed because it dealt with sensitive information, which explains why the second series has only six episodes.

== Production and story style ==
The series takes a realistic, austere, and cynical view of Cold War espionage, undercutting many conventions of the spy thriller genre, in direct contrast to the "girls, guns, and gadgets" of James Bond. Burnside is a harried spymaster who doesn't drink; Willie Caine is an intelligence officer rather than a "super spy", who abhors guns and violence, and is paid a basic civil servant's salary. There are very few action sequences in the dialogue-heavy episodes; the drama instead arises from the high emotional toll taken on Burnside and the Sandbaggers operating in a world of moral ambiguity.

The plots are complex, multi-layered, and unpredictable: regular characters are killed off abruptly, and surprise twists abound. In a typical episode, Burnside moves from office to office speaking and arguing with his colleagues across Whitehall and in the intelligence community. These are interspersed with scenes of the Sandbaggers operating in the field, as well as the "Ops Room", where missions are coordinated and controlled.

== Theme music ==
The title theme music, composed by jazz pianist Roy Budd, establishes its rhythmic undertone with the cimbalom, an instrument often associated with spy thrillers (John Barry, for example, used the cimbalom in his scores for The Ipcress File and The Quiller Memorandum). From series 2 onwards, the theme contains an additional organ playing the same melody line. This version (or 'mix') was also used in the opening titles of episode 2 and episode 7 of series 1).

Unusually for an episodic drama, The Sandbaggers is almost entirely devoid of incidental music. One notable exception is the last episode of series 1 (episode 7) where Burnside's feelings get the better of him for reasons the audience (by then) fully understand.

== Locations ==
Most exterior filming was done in Leeds and the surrounding Yorkshire countryside. The producers successfully used the modernist and brutalist architecture available in Leeds and Yorkshire to create convincing vignettes of eastern bloc locations, but much of this has been redeveloped, reclad or demolished in recent years. Additional exteriors were filmed on location in London and Malta, otherwise the series uses stock footage and set-up shots of foreign locations. With the exception of a very few interior locations, most of the interiors were standing sets, shot on videotape, at Yorkshire Television's studios on Kirkstall Road, Leeds. The contrast between the studio work and the location work on 16mm film is clear to see on screen.

The series uses several regular London locations to set the scene, most notably in and around Westminster. The Foreign and Commonwealth Office on Whitehall and the adjacent King Charles Street appear regularly, and this is where the statue of Robert Clive is sited, looking out into St James's Park. The Boyle Street entrance to 25 Savile Row in Mayfair was used as SIS headquarters and despite some superficial changes it is still recognisable today. The former US Embassy on Grosvenor Square in Mayfair is the location of Jeff Ross's office (and is now a hotel).

=== Art ===
In series one and two, the large painting that hangs in Greenley's office is "The Charge of the Light Brigade" by Robert Alexander Hillingford. When Gibbs becomes "C" in series three, it is replaced by a painting of the Battle of Cape St. Vincent. The painting in Wellingham's office is "Northumberland House, Charing Cross," by John Paul. The painting in Peel's office is an unnamed wooded landscape. In Burnside's office is an unnamed cavalry painting.

== Cast ==
From left to right: Jeff Ross (Sherman), Willie Caine (Lonnen) and Neil Burnside (Marsden) in Burnside's office

Neil Burnside (Roy Marsden)

Burnside is the Director of Operations (D/Ops) of the British Secret Intelligence Service (SIS, also known as MI6). Himself a former Sandbagger and a former Royal Marine officer, Burnside has been D/Ops for only six months at the start of the series. He is arrogant and obsessively dedicated to his job, and regularly finds himself at odds with his superiors, politicians, the Foreign Office, and the Security Service (MI5). The opening titles reveal that Burnside's middle initial is D., as shown on a letter addressed to "N.D. Burnside, Esq." on his desk.

Willie Caine (Ray Lonnen), "Sandbagger One"

Caine, a former paratrooper, is head of the Special Operations Section. He shares a bond of friendship and trust with Burnside, and is not afraid to speak his mind; Burnside describes Caine as "probably the best operative currently operating anywhere in the world". He is the only character besides Burnside to appear in every episode of the series.

Sir James Greenley (Richard Vernon), "C" (series 1 and 2)

Greenley is the recently appointed chief of SIS, code-named "C". Burnside is initially wary of Greenley, who was a diplomat before becoming C, but over time they develop a close relationship; Burnside describes Greenley as "the best C SIS has ever had". He retires at the end of the second series due to angina and is replaced by John Tower Gibbs.

Matthew Peele (Jerome Willis), Deputy Chief

As Deputy Chief, Peele is usually the first person to whom Burnside reports. They share an antagonistic relationship, as Burnside views Peele as a nuisance with no opinions of his own, while Peele considers Burnside reckless, arrogant, and untrustworthy. Peele is generally disliked by most characters, but displays considerable tact and intelligence throughout the series, as he is often more aware of/concerned with the bigger picture than Burnside.

Sir Geoffrey Wellingham (Alan MacNaughtan)

Burnside's personal and professional life come together in Wellingham, Burnside's former father-in-law and the Permanent Secretary at the Foreign Office which oversees SIS. They share an informal but sometimes antagonistic relationship which on occasion is tested to its limit, but also maintain an unspoken fondness and respect for each other.

Jeff Ross (Bob Sherman), head of London station, CIA

Ross is Burnside's only friend, and the two maintain a close personal and professional relationship; he tends to share Burnside's disdain of bureaucratic and political interference. They occasionally work at odds with one another, but are most often allies fighting their common enemies (the Soviets, and bureaucracy within their own agencies). Ross shows himself to be considerably more ruthless and cold-blooded than Burnside on several occasions.

John Tower Gibbs (Dennis Burgess), "C" (series 3 only)

Gibbs replaces Greenley as C in the last episode of the second series. A former head of station with whom Burnside has an antagonistic relationship, Gibbs disapproves of Burnside and his method of operating. His appointment (along with a continued lack of funding) leads to increased tension within SIS. Gibbs and Burnside regularly clash throughout the third series.

Other Sandbaggers

The posts of Sandbaggers Two and Three are filled throughout the series by Jake Landy (David Glyder), Alan Denson (Steven Grives), Laura Dickens (Diane Keen), Tom Elliott (David Beames) and Mike Wallace (Michael Cashman).

Other characters

Diane Lawler (Elizabeth Bennett) is Burnside's fiercely loyal personal assistant; she leaves SIS when she marries at the end of the second series, handpicking her replacement, Marianne Straker (Sue Holderness), who stays with Burnside for the remainder of the series.

Edward Tyler (Peter Laird) is introduced as SIS Director of Intelligence (D/Int) in the first episode of the second series. Tyler, described as "brilliant" by Wellingham and considered the best D/Int SIS has ever had, shares a friendly relationship with Burnside. In the third series he is replaced as D/Int by Paul Dalgetty (David Robb). Dalgetty, who appears in only two episodes, is openly antagonistic towards Burnside and manoeuvres to replace him as D/Ops in "Who Needs Enemies" (3-06).

Sam Lawes (Brian Osborne), Brian Milton (Barkley Johnson) and Bruce (Paul Haley) are often on duty in the Ops Room, coordinating missions.

== Episodes ==
Each of the 20 episodes of The Sandbaggers runs just over fifty minutes without commercials, originally airing with commercial breaks that divided the episode into three acts. Animated bumpers similar to the end credits lead into and out of the commercial breaks.

=== Series 1 ===
No.	Title	Directed by	Written by	Original release date	Guest cast
1–01	"First Principles"	Michael Ferguson	Ian Mackintosh	18 September 1978	Olaf Pooley (Lars Torvik); Richard Shaw (Ted); Brian Haines (Vice Chief of Air Staff); Roger Kemp (Assistant Chief of Air Staff)
Norway's fledgling secret service attempts a spy mission in the Kola Peninsula, but their aircraft crashes in Russian territory. The head of their secret service, Lars Torvik, appeals to Burnside to mount a recovery operation, which Burnside refuses to do; however, the Norwegian government uses political leverage by offering to purchase a British missile defence system, and Whitehall forces Burnside to accept the assignment. While Burnside is gathering data and planning the operation, which is generally considered suicidal, Torvik becomes impatient and requests help from the CIA. When Willie Caine and Jake Landy — Sandbaggers One and Two, respectively — arrive at the aircraft, they find its crew has already been led out by the Americans. They try to catch up with the party, which is inadvertently heading for a Russian military base, but cannot prevent their capture. They escape to Norway undetected, which the UK government is able to use as leverage to sell the defence system to the Norwegians. Locations: The Norwegian Embassy is at 25 Belgrave Square, London. Torvik and Burnside meet at Park Square, Leeds. Ross and Burnside meet by the Roosevelt memorial on Grosvenor Square, London. The crash site and tundra of the Kola Peninsula were filmed up on Ilkley Moor. The Oslo airport interior was filmed in Leeds Bradford Airport (now completely remodelled).
1–02	"A Proper Function of Government"	Michael Ferguson	Ian Mackintosh	25 September 1978	Laurence Payne (Sir Donald Hopkins); Michael O'Hagan (Stan)
When Sir Donald Hopkins, a top government advisor, is unexpectedly seen in Vienna, it is suspected that he intends to defect. Meanwhile, fictional East African President Lutara has been executing British citizens, and SIS has put together a proposal for his assassination. Burnside sends Caine and Sandbagger Three, Alan Denson, to Vienna to deal with Hopkins, and with Jake Landy already on a mission in Iran, proposes that if the Lutara assassination is approved, he will do it himself. This proposal gets no support from his superiors, but he tries to sway Sir Geoffrey Wellingham by suggesting he will get back together with Belinda Wellingham, his ex-wife and Sir Geoffrey's daughter, in exchange. The assassination is rejected by the Prime Minister on the grounds that the taking of human life is not a "proper function of government". Meanwhile, the government is initially unconcerned about Hopkins, but when a top KGB agent is also spotted in Vienna, Whitehall urgently requests that Hopkins be brought back to the UK, hypocritically giving an order to assassinate him if he cannot be taken quietly. Wellingham asks Burnside to go to Vienna and handle the operation himself, giving him the chance to earn the accolades he'd hoped to get through the Lutara assassination, but Burnside refuses, unwilling to undermine Caine. Caine returns Hopkins to the UK, where he is quietly removed from his post and imprisoned. Locations: Burnside's apartment block is at Frobisher House off Dolphin Square in Pimlico. Burnside leaves his flat, walks south onto Grosvenor Road, turns right onto St George’s Square and walks north to Lupus Street, and waits to catch the number 24 bus to Westminster at the stop opposite 15 St George’s Square. In Vienna, Caine intercepts Hopkins in a park in Yorkshire (location tbc). Wellingham and Burnside walk north along Victoria Embankment next to Westminster Pier.
1–03	"Is Your Journey Really Necessary?"	Derek Bennett	Ian Mackintosh	2 October 1978	Brenda Cavendish (Sally Graham); Andrew Bradford (Phil Fyffe); Michael O'Hagan (Stan)
Jake Landy cannot escape Russian territory after assassinating a Soviet general, a mission Burnside initiated without clearance at the request of the CIA. To prevent Landy's capture, he is shot dead by Denson, under orders from Burnside. Denson announces that he intends to resign so that he can marry Sally Graham, but Burnside cannot afford to lose two Sandbaggers at once, so he assigns Caine to investigate Graham—despite SIS' lack of jurisdiction within the UK—in the hope of finding something to break up the relationship. Meanwhile, a British diplomat in Paris, Charles Rumney, has been seen having a secret homosexual affair and is considered a security risk. To avoid dismissing him and causing political problems for his brother Andrew, a promising opposition politician, Wellingham asks Burnside to deal with it quietly. It goes poorly, and Burnside discovers it was due to Wellingham's machinations; a supporter of the current government, he wished to force the resignation of Andrew Romney. When nothing comes of Caine's investigation into Sally Graham, Burnside attempts to blackmail her into ending the relationship herself, upsetting her. Denson is killed by a taxi when crossing a street; when Burnside and Caine visit Graham with the news, they find that she has died by suicide. Locations: Burnside confronts Sally Graham by the orangery in Holland Park gardens in London.
1–04	"The Most Suitable Person"	David Reynolds	Ian Mackintosh	9 October 1978	Stephen Greif (Det. Chief Insp. Gomez); Christopher Benjamin (David Follett); John F. Landry (Stephen Jackson); Hubert Rees (Gordon Forsyth); David McAlister (Peter Waterhouse); Jonathan Coy (Colin Grove)
Burnside must fill the two open Sandbagger positions. Colin Grove, who works for mission planning, is keen to join but Burnside believes he would be a bad candidate. Caine visits the SIS Field School to search for potential replacements, and is recommended top student Laura Dickens; upon meeting Burnside, she is not interested but agrees to join on a temporary basis after he stresses how much she is needed. Meanwhile, Jeff Ross reveals that the CIA have observed Grove visiting a private psychiatrist, raising concern of a leak and jeopardising the special relationship. Grove is sent to Helsinki on a pretext, and further investigation of the psychiatrist uncovers a spy ring involving various government and military personnel. In Gibraltar, a British agent based in Morocco is found dead; Caine is sent to investigate, but while the opposition remains active, no one can decipher their motives. Dickens is sent to Tangier to examine the dead agent's documents, and eventually she, Caine, and Burnside deduce that he was following a recently-released political prisoner intent on revenge against Gibraltar's governor. In London, Burnside confronts Grove, who reveals he was investigating the psychiatrist unofficially, to prove he could be a Sandbagger, and that he had notified a friend in MI5 eight months earlier; Burnside promptly fires him for causing so much trouble and nearly ending the Special Relationship, but is happy to take advantage of MI5's failure to uncover the spy ring itself. Caine and the local police foil the attempt to kill the Governor of Gibraltar. Locations: Colin Grove is seen walking along Devonshire Place in London, close to Harley Street. The SIS field school was filmed at Creskeld Hall in Arthington, north Leeds. Ross and Burnside meet for a "late lunch" at the Italian Garden, Kensington Gardens. Later, Ross and Burnside walk through the rose garden and past a sculpture of Pan at the Sheffield Botanical Gardens, before emerging at Waterloo lake in Roundhay Park, Leeds. In Gibraltar, Caine is pursued by a white Mercedes down Waterside in Knaresborough, from the junction with Water Bag Bank, past the Old Manor House painted like a chessboard, and down towards the viaduct.
1–05	"Always Glad to Help"	David Reynolds	Ian Mackintosh	16 October 1978	Peter Miles (Hamad); Gerald James (Director General of Intelligence); Terence Longdon (Commodore); Alan Thompson (Winfield); Malcolm Hebden (Morris); Peter Ivatts (Wilson)
The Defence Intelligence Staff ask Burnside to send divers to examine a Russian commercial ship, which Burnside resists. Wellingham asks Burnside to help plan a coup d'état in the (fictional) sheikdom of Al-Jalladah to allow Sheikh Hamad to replace his Soviet-aligned father, but Burnside is suspicious of Hamad's motives and withholds SIS approval pending an investigation. Peele immediately supports Wellingham, eager for the political influence should SIS succeed, but C sides with Burnside. Peele tries to get support for the coup from the Ministry of Defence; MoD won't cooperate unless the Russian ship is examined, to which Peele agrees. Burnside assigns Dickens to get close to Hamad; after less than two days Hamad asks her to marry him, and she discovers that he doesn't intend to return to the Middle East but rather is going to Texas to study the oil business. After assurance from Ross that there is no CIA involvement, Burnside and the Sandbaggers conclude that the coup is a fake: the pro-Arab Hamad would lure the British SAS into a trap wherein they would be crushed by a pan-Arab army, ridding his country of the Soviets and showing the world that the Arabs could defeat the United Kingdom. The operation is cancelled, while the operation on the Russian ship is carried out successfully and reveals that the hull is equipped with a secret underwater hatch for divers. Peele tries to be conciliatory, but Burnside rebuffs him, saying they were both merely lucky. Locations: The episode opens with set-up shots of the north entrance to the Ministry of Defence (MoD) main building on Horse Guards Avenue, Westminster. Hamad takes Dickens bowling at Humber Bowl in the Merrion Centre, on Merrion Way, Leeds (now called Tenpin Leeds).
1–06	"A Feasible Solution"	Michael Ferguson	Ian Mackintosh	23 October 1978	Sarah Bullen (Jill Ferris); Kenneth Watson (Hugh Douglas); Richard Cornish (Philip Jeremiah); Donald Churchill (Professor Colby); Peter Cassell (Angelos)
British and Russian missile engineers go missing in Cyprus, and it is suspected that the Greek Cypriot National Front wants to build missiles for an attack on Northern Cyprus. When the Nicosia Station No. 2 is assassinated, Burnside sends Caine to Cyprus with the replacement No. 2, Jill Ferris, who is fresh from the school. When Caine and Ferris are attacked on the road, Ferris' competence and demeanour lead Caine to conclude that she is an experienced agent, and he and Burnside deduce that she is a KGB plant; Caine decides to continue working with Ferris until the operation is complete. Burnside clandestinely examines Dickens's psychiatric evaluations, then invites her out to dinner, after which they have an intimate conversation at his house. After discovering that the engineers are being held in a fortified building near the Northern Cyprus border, Burnside attempts to get backup from the CIA and/or the British military, without success. He refuses to send Dickens as backup, and Caine and Ferris assault the building alone, successfully rescuing the two engineers, although Caine is shot in the shoulder. He reveals to Ferris that he knows she is KGB, and allows her to take the Russian engineer, whom she promptly executes. Back in London, Burnside is furious at Caine, since Ferris could have been left in place in the Nicosia station to be supplied with false information. Locations: In Cyprus, Caine and Ferris are ambushed on a dirt road, filmed at Caley Crags on the Otley Chevin, north of Leeds. Ross and Burnside meet on Trafalgar Square, London.
1–07	"Special Relationship"	Michael Ferguson	Ian Mackintosh	30 October 1978	Alan Downer (Baumel); Richard Shaw (Ted); Cyril Varley (Paul); Brian Ashley (Mittag)
Burnside and Dickens are now in a relationship. When photographs need to be collected from an informant in East Berlin, Burnside has no choice but to send Dickens, who is fluent in German. She collects the photos but is arrested by the SSD, and Burnside scrambles to arrange an exchange. C is reluctant, but Burnside points out that Dickens was recently briefed on the Hungarian underground network and must be returned before she breaks under interrogation. The only available swap is a KGB agent held by the French; in exchange, the French demand a copy of all intelligence received from the Americans for a period of one year. Burnside reluctantly agrees, but realising it could never be kept secret from the Americans, he informs Jeff Ross, who accompanies him to Berlin. As she is being escorted across the East-West border, Dickens is shot dead by a CIA agent. Caine is furious, and Burnside emotionally explains that he had no other option: he couldn't leave Dickens in East Berlin to talk, nor could he allow the end of the Special Relationship. Caine angrily resigns, but after cooling off returns to work the following morning. Locations: Mittag's apartment in East Berlin was filmed at the old Quarry Hill housing complex in Leeds (demolished, 1978). After lunch Burnside and Dickens take a walk through the Hyde Park area of Woodhouse Moor, Leeds. Ross tells Burnside the mission is "go" on Cavendish Street at the south entrance to the Parkinson Building on the Leeds University campus. Burnside is brought to tears on the south west steps of Lambeth Bridge, Westminster, in front of Thames House.

=== Series 2 ===
No.	Title	Directed by	Written by	Original release date	Guest cast
2–01	"At All Costs"	Michael Ferguson	Ian Mackintosh	28 January 1980	Gwyn Gray (Lady Greenley); Joan Peters (Embassy guest)
One year after the end of the first series, two new Sandbaggers have been recruited, Tom Elliott and Mike Wallace. On the first anniversary of Dickens' death, a message is received from Vladimir Galabov, the head of the Bulgarian secret service, who is willing to provide valuable information provided it is collected in person by Elliott in Sofia on the same night. Burnside suspects a setup, but no motive can be discovered, and Director of Intelligence Edward Tyler believes the offer to be genuine. Elliott travels to Sofia and receives the documents from Galabov, but they are interrupted by armed police, revealing that it was Galabov who was being set up. Elliott escapes over a wall but is shot in the back; he manages to get to a safe house and collapses onto the bed, paralysed. Burnside and Caine go to Sofia, where they are armed by Ross, but when they reach Elliott, they have no way to help him. Caine offers to put Elliott out of his misery, but Burnside insists on doing it himself, only to find Elliott has already died. Locations: Burnside smokes a cigarette on the south west steps of Lambeth Bridge, Westminster, in front of Thames House. Burnside and Ross have their "10:20 meeting" in the McDonalds at 155 Victoria Street, London, which is still there. The entrance has moved and the interior redecorated, but you can still sit at their usual table. In Sofia, Burnside and Caine swap TWA bags with Ross on a bench outside the biology department in zone 1, campus west of York University. The bench is directly opposite the biology greenhouses with the "Eric Milner-White A block" of student accommodation across the lake.
2–02	"Enough of Ghosts"	Peter Cregeen	Ian Mackintosh	4 February 1980	Edith MacArthur (Lady Wellingham); Anthony Higgins (Dehousse); Wolf Kahler (Lincke); Donald Pelmear (Nigel Elliott); Barbara Lott (Martha Elliott); Matthew Long (Arthur); Jurgen Anderson (Albrecht); Hugo Bower (Wendicke); Allyson Rees (Air stewardess)
Caine tells Burnside he wants to leave the Sandbaggers; before he can, Wellingham is abducted in Brussels. Burnside sends both Caine and Wallace, ignoring a direct order from Peele to send only one Sandbagger. Information from Tyler's section and the CIA point to the Boulin terrorist group, who have been operating in Brussels but have been ignored by the Belgian police. After Caine and Wallace make an educated guess and search near the kidnapping site, an agent from Germany's GSG 9 named Lincke arrives to help with the investigation; the kidnappers make a ransom demand in which all NATO countries are threatened. The Boulin group itself issues a denial, but the Belgian police round them up, after which Wellingham is abruptly released. Burnside travels to Brussels and, realising what has happened, confronts Lincke with the truth: the kidnappers were actually GSG 9 agents, who kidnapped Wellingham so that Britain would put pressure on Belgium to round up the Boulin group. Caine decides to remain in the Sandbaggers. Locations: The episode features set-up shots and stock footage of Brussels, including the Brussels Hilton. The scene where Wellingham gets into the limo was shot in Yorkshire (location tbc). Ross and Burnside discuss Wellingham's safe outside the old War Office building at 57 Whitehall (now a hotel). The interiors and exteriors of the farm house where Wellingham does his paperwork, and Caine and Wallace do some driving, were most likely filmed in flat lands of the Vale of York or Humberhead Levels (location tbc). Burnside has tea with Lady Wellingham at the "Parkway Tower" (location tbc). Caine and Lincke wait for the Brussels police on York Place, Leeds (the Hotel Metropole is clearly visible in the background). The police car pulls up outside Devonshire House at 37-38 York Place, and Boulin's base is on the first floor of the then semi-derelict 5 York Place (the interior windows match the exterior). After the raid, the police can be seen exiting the building through the right hand doorway which accesses the upper floors. The left door accesses the ground floor, which appears to be a construction site (it is currently a lap dancing club).
2–03	"Decision by Committee"	Michael Ferguson	Ian Mackintosh	11 February 1980	Andrew Lodge (Colonel Gaines); David Beale (C.G.S.); Yashar Adem (Aziz); David Freedman (Kadhim); Stephanie Fayerman (Brigitte); Timothy Stetson (Karl); Kim Fortune (Ahmed); Marta Gillot (Stewardess); Rosalie Williams (English lady); Edwin Brown (Belgian man)
Peele gives Burnside a negative annual report, citing his conduct in the previous episodes and his predilection for acting alone instead of through proper channels. Burnside thinks his career is doomed and considers resigning, but soon a plane is hijacked with Caine and Karen Milner, a CIA agent, onboard. The hijackers direct the plane to Istanbul and demand the release of recently arrested Iraqi terrorists. They threaten to kill two British defence chiefs onboard and, if their demands continue to be unmet, blow up the aircraft. Burnside pushes for an SAS rescue mission, saying that the Sandbaggers need to know that everything possible will be done when they are in trouble. The Cabinet, after long discussion, decides not to give in to the hijackers' demand, but also reject a rescue mission because of the political consequences if it fails. Burnside orders the head of his Special Projects Team, Colonel Ben Gaines, to prepare the team for the rescue operation, despite the fact that they don't have the training or equipment for such a task; he also asks Wellingham for an aircraft. However, Gaines goes to Peele to get the order revoked, and Wellingham refuses to help. When the time arrives for the hijackers to kill the first chief, Caine and Milner overpower them, seizing their guns to shoot them dead. Burnside tells Peele that decision by committee achieved nothing, while officers making their own rules saved the day. Upon Caine's return, Burnside assures him that an SAS rescue was ready to go. Locations: In Sri Lanka, Caine and Milner's hotel is the carefully dressed Trust House Forte Hotel, in Bramhope, north Leeds (now a Britannia hotel). Burnside and Ross meet for a drink in the lounge on the top floor of the London Hilton on Park Lane. The runway exteriors (including the model 'Malaysian World' Boeing 707) were filmed at Leeds Bradford Airport (the control tower and Cookridge Tower can be seen in wide shots). The aeroplane interiors were shot on film so appear to have been filmed on location inside a real aircraft or in a cabin training fuselage. Burnside drives with C, in a Daimler, from Lambeth, across Westminster Bridge, to see Wellingham at the Foreign Office.
2–04	"A Question of Loyalty"	Michael Ferguson	Ian Mackintosh	18 February 1980	Patrick Godfrey (Walter Wheatley); Charles Hodgson (Harry Maddison); Philip Blaine (Gary Shearburn); Igor Gridneff (Polish Police Officer)
Wallace blames embassy staff in Warsaw for botching an operation to pick up a defecting scientist, but the embassy blames Wallace; Burnside believes Wallace, but Peele supports the embassy. Burnside can only avoid the suspension of Wallace by staking his own job on the outcome of an investigation by Peele and strains his relationship with C by openly doubting Peele's integrity. Meanwhile, in Stockholm, the station No. 2, Pat Bishop, is suspected of passing information to the KGB. Burnside sends Wallace to investigate and asks Ross for backup. Ross insists that he take Milner out for dinner first, where she tries to talk with him about his troubles, but Burnside is upset that Ross has revealed so much to her and is hostile. When Ross says he couldn't get approval to send Milner to Stockholm, Burnside sends Caine instead. Milner intercepts Burnside and tells him the CIA have monitored Caine, and she is telling him this without approval from Ross. Caine and Wallace surveil Bishop, but when it appears he has been tipped off, they return to London. Burnside reads Bishop's file, and—combining the information with the CIA and Milner's actions—deduces that he had long ago been recruited by the CIA to infiltrate SIS and was passing misinformation to the KGB. He meets Ross and tells him Bishop will be removed from the station, but circumspectly blames the Canadians, to avoid damaging the special relationship. To Burnside's surprise, Peele's investigation comes out in favour of Wallace. Locations: In Warsaw, Wallace waits for Motika outside Leeds Polytechnic's Brunswick Building (demolished in 2009 to make way for the Leeds Arena); the top of Wade House at the Merrion Centre can be seen when he returns to his car. Motika's apartment was in the Hunslet Grange Flats, Leeds (demolished, 1983). In Sweden, Caine and Wallace walk beside the River Ouse just north of the Lendal Bridge in York, along what is now the 'Dame Judi Dench Walk'. Milner meets Burnside in the fog on the south west steps of Lambeth Bridge, Westminster, in front of Thames House. Litman waits for his meeting on the Blue Bridge in York, where the River Foss meets the Ouse.
2–05	"It Couldn't Happen Here"	Peter Cregeen	Ian Mackintosh	25 February 1980	Daphne Anderson (Mary Herron); Norman Ettlinger (Senator Herron); Weston Garvin (Senator O'Shea); Tony Church (Stratford-Baker); Don Fellows (Al Briscoe); John Crosse (Newscaster)
When Senator Herron, a prominent civil rights supporter, is assassinated in the United States, Ross suspects the FBI, which he also believes was responsible for the murders of John F. Kennedy and Martin Luther King. The US Secret Service requests backup from both Sandbaggers at Herron's funeral to protect his replacement, Senator Donald O'Shea, as they apparently trust neither the FBI nor CIA. At Herron's funeral, O'Shea gives a speech but ignores Caine's instructions and is also assassinated. The assassin turns out to be a lone madman. Meanwhile in West Germany, an officer of the SIS is killed in a car crash while on holiday with the driver, a prominent British politician named George Stratford-Baker. He covers up his involvement and returns to the UK, but although he is soon identified by the police, they drop the investigation after political pressure. Burnside investigates Stratford-Baker further, initially thinking it would be useful to have a hold over a cabinet minister, despite Peele wanting to call him off. He asks Ross about Stratford-Baker and learns that he was a Marxist activist before going into politics. He has Milner search his apartment and she finds suspicious equipment. Wellingham says that MI5 has known for years that Stratford-Baker was a KGB agent, but the Prime Minister has refused to act. Burnside confronts Stratford-Baker in a park, but he refuses to yield, saying that there's no solid evidence against him. Burnside ponders the ethics of the SIS assassinating him, discussing it with Wellingham, who asks him not to bother C because he (C) is suffering from angina and will be leaving soon. Burnside says assassination would be unethical and lead to more of the same. However, on learning that Stratford-Baker will soon be visiting Singapore, he asks Caine to visit their friends in the Singaporean government and arrange a traffic accident. Locations: In West Virginia, Herron's house was filmed at Newton Kyme Hall, Tadcaster, north east of Leeds. Ross and Burnside have a McDonald's lunch in St James's Park opposite HM Treasury. In West Virginia, O'Shea and Caine drive past University House, the Refectory, and the Clothworkers' Building on Leeds University campus. Herron's funeral is held at the Saltaire United Reformed Church in Shipley, north Bradford. Burnside confronts Stratford-Baker in St James's Park (the Duke of York column is visible above the trees).
2–06	"Operation Kingmaker"	Alan Grint	Ian Mackintosh	3 March 1980	NA
Burnside loses two close allies at once: Greenley departs due to angina, and Lawler is resigning to get married. Wellingham is leading a committee to find a replacement C, and the leading candidate is John Tower Gibbs, an SIS officer who has been seconded to the Joint Intelligence Committee for the last three years. Gibbs is competent but abrasive and has a particular dislike for Burnside after they butted heads when the latter was Sandbagger One. Despite Caine's (and everyone's) misgivings, Burnside launches "Operation Kingmaker", using the two Sandbaggers in an attempt to convince Wellingham to choose Peele as C instead. Caine discovers that Wellingham is concerned about Libyan influence in Malta, so Burnside tutors Peele on the subject before taking him to lunch with Wellingham, where he is suitably impressive. A tip from Tyler leads to Gibbs' personal records, where Caine finds that Gibbs' first assignment in Copenhagen was cut short; Burnside uses Lawler's replacement, Marianne Straker, to access the security files, revealing that Gibbs was sent home after an affair with a Danish politician's wife. Burnside tells Wellingham about it and says it's a standing joke in the office; Wellingham appears to come out in favour of Peele, and Burnside returns to his office triumphant. However, he is shocked to find a new memorandum from Peele, advocating the amalgamation of MI5 and SIS, which Peele staunchly defends despite never being in favour of it before. Burnside returns to Wellingham and confesses his schemes, and Wellingham reveals that Gibbs had been appointed C that morning, before any of Burnside's manoeuvring. Wellingham had been on to Burnside since Peele brought up Malta, and asked Peele to write the amalgamation paper to find out if he (Peele) really had a mind of his own, as Burnside claimed. Burnside offers to resign, but Wellingham, having put Burnside in his place, says he prefers to see him suffering under Gibbs. However, he assures Burnside that should he ever try anything similar again, he will be out of the service. Locations: Peele buys a suit from a Dunn & Co. store at 373 Strand, London (now closed). Burnside emerges from St James's Park and runs into Gibbs on the Clive steps outside the Foreign Office. Later Peele and Burnside, in a Daimler, are driven (from the Foreign Office) north along Horse Guards Road, left onto The Mall, right onto Marlborough Road, past St James's Palace, to meet Wellingham for lunch. Later, Burnside and Milner drive south down Bolton Street, turn right onto Piccadilly and head towards Knightsbridge via the Hyde Park Corner road underpass.

=== Series 3 ===
No.	Title	Directed by	Written by	Original release date	Guest cast
3–01	"All in a Good Cause"	Peter Cregeen	Ian Mackintosh	9 June 1980	Gale Gladstone (Jenny Ross); John Steiner (Trevor D'Arcy); Kristopher Kum (Chinese waiter)
One week after the events of the previous series, Burnside must respond to a budgetary proposal to close the Caribbean station in Kingston, and his initial letter, drafted by Wallace, is rejected by Gibbs as too blunt. Marianne Straker discovers a ruling that would prevent the closure of the Kingston station if it were more than 1,000 miles from the station at Caracas; although the distance is actually around 800 miles, Burnside drafts a response saying it's over 1,000 miles, securing Wellingham's endorsement so that nobody will check and the Kingston station will remain open on this technicality. At the same time, Burnside learns that MI5 is investigating Jeff Ross's wife, Jenny, who Ross says is bored and unhappy. Burnside orders Caine to watch Jenny, and finds that she is meeting a man named D'arcy; he realises he is being fed information about the investigation by MI5. Caine follows D'arcy but loses him, suggesting he's a trained agent, possibly KGB, intending to blackmail Ross; Burnside surmises that MI5 knows this and is planning to save Jenny at the last minute in order to impress the CIA. Caine spots another man watching Jenny, and trails him back to the US embassy, then learns from Tyler that D'arcy is Burnside's counterpart in MI5. He meets D'arcy, who tells him that it's not MI5 targeting the CIA, but the CIA targeting MI5: Ross was using Jenny to attempt to compromise D'arcy, to get leverage to stop an MI5 investigation into a paedophiliac American general. MI5 involved SIS because they knew Burnside would go to Ross and inadvertently break up the CIA scheme. Burnside angrily confronts Ross about being used and severs (personal) ties with him. The Kingston-Caracas ruse is successful and the station is kept open, but Gibbs notices the trick after the fact and warns Burnside against using such tactics in the future. Locations: D'Arcy and Burnside stroll along Carlton House Terrace in London, past the Royal Society, turn right down the steps at the Duke of York column, cross The Mall and walk into St James's Park.
3–02	"To Hell With Justice"	Peter Cregeen	Ian Mackintosh	16 June 1980	John Alkin (Len Shepard); Mark Eden (Bernard Tindale); Glynis Barber (Margaret Muller)
Tyler takes a working holiday in Malta without his wife and is discovered by the station with a woman whom he hasn't reported for a routine check. Burnside is notified, but to avoid damaging Tyler's career, refrains from reporting it, instead sending both Sandbaggers to Malta without clearance. He decides, if Tyler has turned, he'll have him killed without informing Peele or Gibbs; Peele insists on knowing why the Sandbaggers are in Malta, and in turn tells Gibbs. Gibbs tells Burnside that assassination is not an option without the PM's approval. Ross informs Burnside that the CIA knows that the woman is a KGB agent, and Burnside asks him not to tell his superiors since he'll deal with it himself if necessary, to avoid a public trial that could be the end of SIS. Burnside goes to Malta and confronts Tyler, who confesses that he has been a double agent since the start of his career, when he fell in love with a girl in Moscow and was blackmailed. He decided recently to defect to Moscow, but once in Malta delayed any action, subconsciously hoping to be caught. Burnside balks at the prospect of killing Tyler, insisting on bringing him back to England after all; however, wishing to spare his family and SIS the ordeal, Tyler dies by suicide via a cyanide pill. Locations: This episode features extensive exterior and interior location filming in Malta. Tyler stays at the Excelsior Hotel (now the Grand Excelsior) in Floriana. Tyler and Burnside talk at the Upper Barrakka Gardens.
3–03	"Unusual Approach"	David Cunliffe	Ian Mackintosh	23 June 1980	Rio Fanning (Bob Cheever); Philip Bond (Sir Roderick Hives); David Horovitch (Philip Skinner); Brigitte Kahn (Christina Stratos); Matthew Long (Arthur); Paul Ridley (Russian Policeman); Andy Graham (Russian Official); Terry Pearson (APSO); Lindsay Blackwell (Air stewardess)
Wellingham and Peele are going to a conference on Rhodes, so Gibbs takes the opportunity to send Burnside with them under the pretext of giving him a vacation. When Caine takes over as Acting D-Ops, Jeff Ross asks him to mount an operation to rescue CIA agent Bob Cheever, who is wounded and hiding in Sukhumi after killing a Soviet officer. He offers SIS a "blank cheque", which leads the Foreign Office to approve the mission over Caine's reluctance. Both the CIA and the USSR expect the rescue attempt to come from the Turkish border to the southeast, so Caine has Wallace (posing as a French salesman) fly Paris–Moscow–Krasnodar and drive to Sukhumi from the opposite direction. Wallace makes it to Sukhumi, and finds that Cheever does not match the false papers he has brought; Cheever guesses that Ross expected Wallace to get caught, thereby diverting attention from a subsequent CIA mission from the Turkish border. Meanwhile in Rhodes, Wellingham and Burnside are desperately bored by Peele; Skinner, the top British agent in Greece, warns Burnside that the KGB is expected to target participants at the conference with honeypots. Later, a Greek woman makes a pass at Burnside, so he strings her along, falsely telling her that he is happily married with two daughters, before telling her at the last minute that she has been wasting her time. At his room that night, Skinner tells him that the woman is in fact a Greek agent who is on leave after a messy divorce, exactly as she'd claimed. Wallace returns Cheever safely to London. Locations: In Rhodes, Burnside, Peel, and Wellingham stay at the Villa Messina in Rabat, Malta (now a care home). In Russia, Wallace's arrival at Krasnodar airport was filmed on the Leeds University campus in the section of the "red route" corridor linking the EC Stoner Building to the Mathematics and Earth Sciences Building. The Roger Stevens Building is visible through the window behind. A few shots of the control tower at Leeds Bradford airport cement the illusion.
3–04	"My Name Is Anna Wiseman"	David Cunliffe	Gidley Wheeler	30 June 1980	Carol Gillies (Anna Wiseman); Guy Deghy (Fyodor Solodovnikov); Anthony Schaeffer (Rogerson); Terry Walsh (Training Officer); Terry Pearson (APSO)
Anna Wiseman was an employee of SIS under Tyler several years ago. She asked Burnside for help in becoming a sleeper agent in the Eastern Bloc. Burnside advised that she must first leave SIS, and it was arranged that she was sacked for a supposed affair with Peele's predecessor. She went on to become a top civilian at NATO headquarters in Brussels and has engaged in an affair with a Russian diplomat who is going to help her defect. However, on learning that she has cancer and less than a year to live, Wiseman has decided instead to allow herself to be arrested by the Soviets as an enemy agent, and at the show trial to make a case for human rights. She makes a voice recording for future propaganda broadcast and gives it to Burnside, who has a longstanding interest in helping dissident movements in the Eastern Bloc. He believes she could be a significant inspiration to dissidents. With Gibbs absent, he tries to convince Peele to approve an operation to help her defect, without revealing her plan to be arrested, but Peele refuses to allow it since it would involve stealing a NATO secret document. Burnside tells her that she won't get official support, but she decides to defect anyway. Burnside sends Wallace without approval to help make her defection more newsworthy; he shoots her in the shoulder as she is picked up. The ruse is successful and Wiseman's defection is front page news; Burnside successfully claims to Peele and Gibbs that he had nothing to do with it. Locations: In Brussels, Anna's apartment was filmed at the Granby Hotel, Harrogate (now a care home). Caine climbs the stairs of the Merrion Centre multi-storey car park on Merrion Way, Leeds (refurbished, 2013), to collect a letter from a VW Beetle parked on the top floor. Merrion House (refurbished, 2018), Leeds College of Technology (demolished, 2021) and Leeds Civic Hall (still extant) are all clearly visible against the sky. Burnside meets Anna at a First World War cemetery near Ypres which was filmed at the Harrogate (Stonefall) Cemetery. The gatehouse to the Harewood Estate in north Leeds was used as the entrance to the cemetery. Wallace takes the cello to 15 Park Place, Leeds, where he watches Anna walk down the steps of "Hotel Rogiet" at 28 Park Place (now demolished). The large brutalist building seen at the end of the street is the Leeds International Pool (demolished, 2009). The airport scenes were shot on the Leeds University campus, using the ground floor of the Roger Stevens Building and the section of the "red route" corridor linking the Roger Stevens to the Mathematics and Earth Sciences Building. Burnside leaves the office on Boyle Street, then he walks south along Victoria Embankment, turns right onto Bridge Street and past Westminster tube station, crosses Canon Row, buys an Evening Standard and stops outside St Stephen's Tavern, before continuing on towards Parliament Square, bearing right onto Parliament Street.
3–05	"Sometimes We Play Dirty Too"	Peter Cregeen	Arden Winch	7 July 1980	John Line (Maple); Michael Sheard (Dr. Crabbe); Jean Rimmer (Irene Banks); Derek Godfrey (Robert Banks); Aimée Delamain (Penelope); Sherrie Hewson (Betty Galthorpe); Milos Kirek (Vales); Susan Kodicek (Nadina); John Fuest, Douglas Reid, Raymond Sidebottom, Ian Wright (Restaurant Quartet)
Robert Banks is a British industrialist, former scientist and a top source for the Joint Intelligence Bureau residing in Prague. When he is reported dead in a car crash, Burnside finds it suspicious and sends Caine to Prague to investigate. Caine learns that Banks was having an affair with a Czech business client, who Ross reports is a KGB or SNB agent. Further investigations suggest that the death was faked. His wife in the UK also knows about the affair and believes he is still alive. When Caine discovers where Banks is hiding and visits him, Banks says that he is in love with the agent, and although he knows her true job, he has decided to defect so that he can live with her in Prague. Caine tells him that he is just the latest in a long line of victims, and she would soon disappear. Caine shows Banks faked photographs of her in bed with numerous other prominent men, so Banks agrees to return to the UK with Caine. Locations: Burnside walks east on Northumberland Avenue, Westminster, and enters the old Ministry of Defence (MoD) offices in the Metropole Hotel (now a hotel again). After arriving in Prague, Caine is driven to the "ACI "offices in Leeds (location tbc). The ACI interiors were filmed at 49 St Paul's Street, Leeds (the distinctive brickwork of St Pauls House can be seen through the windows). Ross and Burnside meet at the Imperial Camel Corps Memorial in Victoria Embankment Gardens, London.
3–06	"Who Needs Enemies"	Peter Cregeen	Gidley Wheeler	14 July 1980	Edith MacArthur (Lady Wellingham); Harry Webster (Dr. O'Toole); John Eastham (Nick Pearson); Lola Young (Ward sister); Mary Cornford (Judy)
Burnside is antagonising everyone, including Caine and Wellingham. When a medical report confirms that Burnside is showing signs of stress, Peele proposes to Gibbs that his job be given to Paul Dalgetty, Tyler's replacement as D-Int. When Underwood, the head of Madrid station, commits suicide, Burnside is suspicious and sends Caine to take charge of the station for a few days. Underwood had received a secret CIA evaluation of SIS from a new GRU double agent. Part of the evaluation was sent to Dalgetty, who breaks protocol by hiding it from Burnside and giving it directly to Peele; it describes Burnside as "tending to play a one-man band causing friction and distrust in SIS". Gibbs proposes that Burnside become the new head of Madrid station, which is supported by Wellingham and would be technically a promotion, but to a station with little relevance. Burnside is resigned to his fate, and while walking alone at night is mugged and committed to hospital; Lady Wellingham visits and suggests that getting back together with Belinda would be good for his career. He discharges himself early and returns to the office, where Caine gives him the other part of the CIA evaluation: Underwood's entry states that his wife had been engaged in lesbian affairs, which led to his suicide. Burnside demands that Peele show him the rest of the document, and then confronts Ross about it. Ross shows him his copy, which is favourable to both Burnside and Underwood, revealing that the version received from GRU was faked to sow discord within SIS. Dalgetty is at fault for not passing the evaluation to Burnside, and Gibbs asks Burnside to remain as Director of Operations. Locations: Ross and Burnside walk from Horse Guards and across Horse Guards Parade, Whitehall. Later, Ross and Burnside have a coffee in the McDonalds at 155 Victoria Street, London, and walk out into Cathedral Piazza, and then along Boyle Street. That night, Burnside takes a stroll along Charing Cross Road, before running into some skinheads in Leicester Square and ending up in St Thomas' Hospital, Lambeth. Judging by the brickwork, and the building seen through the windows, the interiors were probably filmed at Leeds General Infirmary. Burnside rides in a black cab along Grosvenor Street to see Ross at the US Embassy on Grosvenor Square, Mayfair.
3–07	"Opposite Numbers"	Peter Cregeen	Ian Mackintosh	28 July 1980	John Alkin (Len Shepherd); Frank Moorey (Yuri Filatov); Larry Hooderoff (Nikolai Sarkisyan)
While Peele and Wellingham attend the SALT 3 conference in Malta, Caine and Wallace are providing security, along with the head of station Len Shepherd. Burnside thinks that any treaty will be abused by the Soviets to gain military superiority and wants to sabotage the conference. When he hears that Yuri Filatov, a KGB colonel and longstanding SIS double agent, is in Malta and wants to defect, he disregards instructions to try to talk him out of it and encourages him to come right away. Although Wellingham refuses to give approval, he instructs Caine, Wallace and Shepherd to collect Filatov and keep him in a safe house, then returns to London. Gibbs tells him to try to make a deal with Sarkisyan, the KGB head in Malta, that both sides will keep quiet about the defection, and warns him that disrupting the conference will cost him his job. While in London, Burnside rejects a request by Straker to attend the field school to train to be a Sandbagger. Returning to Malta, he speaks to Sarkisyan, but instead of presenting Gibbs' offer, tells him that Filatov is already in England, and the British will denounce the Soviets in a few days. Sarkisyan is suspicious and goes to see Peele, his opposite number, who knows nothing about the defection. Peele and Wellingham demand to know from Burnside and the Sandbaggers if they are holding Filatov, but they deny it, saying it is a KGB lie to disrupt the conference, which is going badly for the Soviets. Peele then talks to Shepherd who reveals all and gives him the address of the villa where Filatov is hiding. Peele informs the KGB, who go to the villa in force and take Filatov back. Wellingham orders Burnside back to London and points out that the Soviets will no longer be able to use Filatov as an excuse to pull out of the conference. Burnside and Caine realise that the KGB will find another excuse: shoot somebody and blame the SIS. Caine and Wallace rush to the Soviet delegation, where Caine spots a sniper on a roof. He jumps in front of Filatov to protect him; he is shot and falls to the ground, possibly dead. Locations: This episode features extensive interior and exterior location filming in Malta. The SALT conference takes place at the Grand Hotel Verdala in Rabat (demolished, 2021) and the Malta Hilton in St. Julian's. Burnside hides Filatov at 4 Vjal Santu Wistin, also in Rabat. Ross and Burnside walk north along Victoria Embankment, from Westminster Pier to the Ministry of Defence (MoD).

== Reception ==
=== Critical review ===
Television critics' reviews of The Sandbaggers have been almost uniformly positive. In 1989, Walter Goodman of The New York Times dubbed The Sandbaggers "the real stuff" for fans of the spy genre. He goes on to note, concerning the seventh episode ("Special Relationship"): "Although the issue of love versus duty is overdrawn and the tale, like others, is a bit forced in places, the Burnside character and the urgency of the story-telling make it work. Most of the Sandbagger episodes work." Similarly, critic Terrence Rafferty called The Sandbaggers "the best spy series in television history".

The Sandbaggers, television critic Rick Vanderknyff also wrote, "is many things American network television is not: talky and relatively action-free, low in fancy production values but high in plot complexity, and starring characters who aren't likable in the traditional TV way".

When reviewing the 2013 Network DVD release of The Sandbaggers: The Complete Series, Toby Manning wrote: "this 70s spy drama about a cold war dirty tricks department is cynical, tough – and has a compelling star in Roy Marsden's brute in a well-cut suit."

== Broadcast history ==
- In the UK, series one was broadcast nationwide on ITV in September and October 1978; Series two, January to March 1980; Series three, June and July 1980. ITV repeated The Sandbaggers once in the 1980s. In the 1990s, the cable/satellite channels Granada Plus and SelecTV showed repeats. All three series were shown on London Live (TV channel) commencing 9 December 2023.
- In Canada, CBC Television aired The Sandbaggers nationwide in the 1980s.
- In Australia, the Nine Network aired The Sandbaggers nationwide in 1982.
- In the US, The Sandbaggers was sold in syndication to individual PBS stations from the mid-1980s until the mid-1990s. The first season got very high ratings in the United States, but after that ratings waned. However the show "garnered a cult following (in the US) due to its realistic portrayal of espionage and complex, multi-layered storytelling."
- In Italy, the series was briefly shown on some local television stations in 1988. All episodes were dubbed in Italian.
- In Israel, Channel 1 aired The Sandbaggers (titled "The Selected") nationwide in the mid-1980s. All episodes were subtitled in Hebrew.

== Merchandise ==
=== DVD ===
- All 20 episodes are available in the UK and European market in Region 2 PAL-format DVD sets, the first two series being released by Network DVD in August 2005 and May 2006 respectively. (Unlike the BFS DVDs, the Network DVDs include in each episode the "bumpers" which led into and out of advertisement breaks during transmission on commercial television. These bumpers display "End of Part One", "Part Two", "End of Part Two" and "Part 3" accompanied by a snippet of the theme music.)
- All 20 episodes of The Sandbaggers are available in the North American market in Region 0 NTSC-format DVD sets which were released by BFS Entertainment in August 2001 (Series 1 and 2) and September 2003 (Series 3).

=== Video ===
- The complete series is also available on NTSC videotapes, in three sets. (Episode 7, "Special Relationship", was omitted from the Series One set and thus appears out of order on the Series Three set.)
- Four episodes were released on two PAL videocassettes in the mid-1980s, but these PAL tapes are out of print.

=== Books ===
- The Sandbaggers by Ian Mackintosh (Corgi Books, 1978) novelises "Always Glad to Help" and "A Feasible Solution". Out of print.
- The Sandbaggers: Think of a Number (Corgi Books, 1980) is an original novel by "Donald Lancaster", a pseudonym for mystery writer William Marshall, who was commissioned to write it after Ian Mackintosh's disappearance. Out of print.

== Events ==
=== Sandbagger One ===
Flyer for 1992's Sandbagger One event.

"Sandbagger One" was held in Bellmawr, New Jersey, on 8 and 9 August 1992 and organised by Michael Macomber and Caryn Dunkel. The guest of honour was Ray Lonnen. It was a small event but Ray Lonnen expressed amazement that there was still interest in the series so long after it ended. For many years it remained the one and only organised fan event dedicated to the series.

=== Sandbagger Two ===
"Sandbagger Two" was a live virtual webinar held on 7 October 2023 as a global celebration to mark the 45th anniversary of the first UK broadcast. It was organised by The Sandbaggers Yorkshire Television 1978-1980 Facebook group. The keynote speakers were Roy Marsden and Greg Rucka. The event also included discussion of Ian Mackintosh's life, his novels, and other television work influenced by The Sandbaggers.

== Legacy ==
=== The Sandbaggers in America ===
The Sandbaggers generated a cult following when broadcast in the USA. PBS outlet KTEH in San Jose, California aired at least five runs of The Sandbaggers after it became "a local phenomenon". American Sandbaggers fandom produced fanzines, websites, and even the first ever dedicated convention: "Sandbagger One" in 1992.

=== Queen & Country ===
Greg Rucka, novelist and creator of the comic book espionage series Queen & Country, has said that the comic book is consciously inspired by The Sandbaggers and is in a sense a "quasi-sequel". In the comic book, the structure of SIS mirrors that seen in the television series, down to the division of responsibilities between Directors of Operations and Intelligence and the existence of a Special Operations Section known as the "Minders". The comic book also features a more modern and sophisticated Ops Room, and bureaucratic wrangling reminiscent of the television series.

Several characters and situations in Queen & Country parallel The Sandbaggers, including a fatherly "C" who is eventually replaced by a more political and less sympathetic appointee; a Director of Operations who is fiercely protective of the Special Section; a Deputy Chief antagonistic to the independent nature of the Minders; a rivalry with MI5; and a cooperative relationship with the CIA. In addition, several scenes and lines of dialogue are similar or allude to the television series. However, as the comic book takes place in the present day, the geopolitical situation is very different. In addition, the stories are more action-oriented and focus on the exploits of Minder Tara Chace rather than on Paul Crocker, the Director of Operations.

== Bibliography ==
- Mackintosh, Ian. (1978). The Sandbaggers. (Corgi Books).

== See also ==
- List of The Sandbaggers characters
- Warship
- Ian Mackintosh
- Circles of Deceit
- Spooks
