= Ray Lonnen =

English actor (1940–2014)

- Born: Raymond Stanley Lonnen; 18 May 1940; Bournemouth, Hampshire, England
- Died: 11 July 2014 (aged 74); London, England
- Occupation: Actor
- Children: 3

Raymond Stanley Lonnen (18 May 1940 – 11 July 2014) was an English stage and television actor. His most prominent roles include Willie Caine in the ITV cult classic Cold War-era spy drama series, The Sandbaggers (1978–80), and also Harry Brown in the television miniseries Harry's Game (1982).

== Early life ==
Lonnen was born in Bournemouth, where he attended the Stourfield School and the Hampshire School of Acting. At 19 he gained his first professional acting job at a theatre in Belfast. He then appeared in repertory theatre in English towns and cities including York and made his first television appearance alongside John Alderton in Emergency – Ward 10.

== Television career ==
Lonnen's early acting appearances include TV series such as Mrs Thursday (1966), The Power Game (1966) and Market in Honey Lane (1967), and a small role in the film Zeppelin (1971).

He had a small part as a uniformed Guardian, Brum G, in Episode 3 of the 1971 LWT TV series, The Guardians. He then had a semi-regular role in the British crime drama series Z-Cars as Detective Sergeant Terry Moffatt from 1972 to 1975, before becoming a regular when Moffatt was promoted to become the new D.I. for the series from 1976 to 1977. Lonnen appeared as Gardiner in "Frontier in Space", a 1973 episode of the BBC cult TV sci-fi series Doctor Who, and as Knaggs, a wanted bankrobber/gangster in a 1975 episode of Public Eye.

Lonnen was unavailable to film what became the final series of Z-Cars in 1978 because he was cast in the ITV cult Cold War spy drama TV series, The Sandbaggers, in which he played Willie Caine ("Sandbagger One"), one of the leads. The Sandbaggers ran for three series in 1978 and 1980.

After playing the lead role in an episode of the ITV cult anthology series, Hammer House of Horror in 1980, Lonnen was given his next lead role in 1982 in the ITV mini-series Harry's Game, based on the novel by Gerald Seymour, playing Harry Brown, a British agent sent to Northern Ireland to smoke out the IRA assassin of a cabinet minister.

In 1984 Lonnen went on to star in yet another spy-themed drama series, The Brief, in which he played a British barrister who travels to Germany to represent a British soldier accused of spying and treason. He also appeared in the 1985 thriller movie Murder Elite, opposite Ali MacGraw, Billie Whitelaw and Hywel Bennett.

Aside from his lead roles, Lonnen also continued to appear in guest roles throughout the 1980s, including in episodes of The Gentle Touch, Roald Dahl's Tales of the Unexpected, Lovejoy and the 1988 French film Mangeuses d'Hommes.

In 1990 Lonnen played Detective Inspector Alex Vale in the ITV detective drama series Yellowthread Street, which was set in Hong Kong. The series, based on novels by William Leonard Marshall, ran for 13 episodes.

Throughout the 1990s Lonnen continued to make guest appearances in various television series and voiced several characters in the children's animated series Budgie the Little Helicopter. In 2001 he had a recurring role in the ITV police series The Bill. He appeared in several episodes of the Canadian sci-fi series Starhunter and had a recurring role in the short-lived revival of the ITV soap opera Crossroads.

== Stage roles ==
From the 1960s onwards Lonnen performed in a variety of stage productions, including dramas, comedies and musicals. His stage credits include Under Milk Wood (as the Narrator), Same Time, Next Year, In Praise of Love, Run for Your Wife, Wonderful Town, Lock Up Your Daughters, Guys and Dolls, Bells Are Ringing, Rebecca and The Perfect Murder.

== Personal life ==
Lonnen was first married to Jean Conyers and then to the actress Lynn Dalby, with whom he had three children. His third wife was the actress Tara Ward.

=== Death ===
Lonnen died at his home in London on 11 July 2014 from cancer, aged 74. He was survived by his wife, two sons and a daughter.

== Partial filmography ==
- Zeppelin (1971) - Sgt. Grant
- Action at Dog Island (1972)
- Murder Elite (1985) - Ron Price
- Midsomer Murders (2007) - Peter Baxter
