= Perfect murder =

Perfect murder may refer to:

- Perfect murder, a murder that left no clue to trace the perpetrators
- Perfect murder (fiction), the fiction subgenre
- Perfect Murder, Perfect Town, 2000 film documenting the events behind and following the JonBenet Ramsey murder
- A Perfect Murder, 1998 remake of the 1954 film Dial M for Murder
- A Perfect Murder (band), a groove metal band
- "A Prefect Murder", an episode of the science fiction television series Farscape
- The Perfect Murder (novel), a 1964 novel by H. R. F. Keating
  - The Perfect Murder (1988 film), an English-language Indian film based on Keating's novel, produced by Merchant-Ivory
- The Perfect Murder (James novel), by Peter James (2010)
- The Perfect Murder (2019 film), an Indian urban crime drama short film
- "The Perfect Murder" (short story), a 1988 short story written by Jeffrey Archer
- The Perfect Murder (TV series), 2014 American documentary television series

== See also ==
- Perfect crime (disambiguation)
