= Bless This House (film) =

1972 British comedy by Gerald Thomas

- Film poster by Arnaldo Putzu
- Directed by: Gerald Thomas
- Written by: Dave Freeman
- Produced by: Peter Rogers
- Starring: Sid James; Diana Coupland; Terry Scott; June Whitfield; Peter Butterworth
- Cinematography: Alan Hume
- Edited by: Alfred Roome
- Music by: Eric Rogers
- Production company: Peter Rogers Productions
- Distributed by: Rank Film Distributors
- Release date: 8 September 1972
- Running time: 87 minutes
- Country: United Kingdom
- Language: English

Bless This House is a 1972 British comedy film directed by Gerald Thomas starring Sid James, Diana Coupland, Terry Scott, June Whitfield and Peter Butterworth. It is a spin-off from the 1971 television sitcom Bless This House.

== Plot ==
In contemporary suburbia, somewhere in southern England, middle-aged home-owner Sid Abbott just wants to lie on his settee and snooze. He is initially frustrated by his wife, work-shy son, and fashion-conscious daughter.

Their next door neighbour, Mr Hobbs, puts his house up for sale. The rude and arrogant Ronald Baines and his family move in next door and things worsen.

Sid works as a rep and is trying to sell to the Fizzo Drinks company when his daughter Sally arrives with a group of environmentalists to protest the use of non-disposable containers. Meanwhile, Kate, Ronald's daughter, starts working next to Mike, Sid's son, and a romance begins to blossom. He drives her home in his psychedelic Morris Minor.

Sid buys a garden shed and sits drinking there with his friend Trevor. They find a book about distilling and decide to create an illegal still in the shed. Sid tells his wife it is for making wine. In fact they are distilling home made rhubarb wine to create brandy. As Ronald is a customs and excise officer this does not bode well.

Mike and Kate get engaged and the wedding day arrives. On the wedding day a fire starts in the shed. Ronald and Sid put the fire out and miss the wedding. A fire engine gives them a lift to the church in time for the photos.

Despite Mike getting married at the end of the film, he is still single when the TV series returned.

== Cast ==
The film starred many of the main actors from the TV series but some were replaced; most notably Robin Stewart, who was replaced by Robin Askwith because he had already been booked for the summer season on Bournemouth Pier and could not also appear in the film; though Stewart would return for the remainder of the six series. Another change was the role of Trevor Lewis, played in the film by Peter Butterworth and on television by Anthony Jackson.

- Sid James as Sid Abbott
- Diana Coupland as Jean Abbott
- Terry Scott as Ronald Baines
- June Whitfield as Vera Baines
- Peter Butterworth as Trevor Lewis
- Sally Geeson as Sally Abbott
- Robin Askwith as Mike Abbott
- Patsy Rowlands as Betty Lewis
- Carol Hawkins as Kate Baines
- Janet Brown as Annie Hobbs
- Julian Orchard as Tom Hobbs
- Tommy Godfrey as Alf Murray
- George A. Cooper as cafe owner
- Bill Maynard as Oldham
- Marianne Stone as Muriel
- Wendy Richard as Carol
- Patricia Franklin as Mary
- Molly Weir as Mary's mother
- Ed Devereaux as Jim
- Johnny Briggs as truck driver
- Frank Thornton as Mr Jones
- Norman Mitchell as police sergeant
- Brian Osborne as removal van driver
- Margaret Lacey as vicar's wife
- Georgina Moon as Moira
- Michael Nightingale as vicar

== Filming and locations ==
The film was shot 19 June–1 August 1972. The exterior shots of the houses were filmed at numbers 7 and 9, Bolton Avenue, Windsor. Other exterior scenes were shot in Burnham, a village in Buckinghamshire, including St Peter's Church (wedding scene), Church Street (magistrates court/pub scene) and the High Street (fire engine scene). Interiors were filmed at Pinewood Studios, Buckinghamshire.

It was produced by Peter Rogers who also made the Carry On films.

== Critical reception ==
The Monthly Film Bulletin wrote: "An essentially plotless collection of sketches, Bless This House ... depends for its humour on contrived and prolonged bouts of funny business, in which fire, water and do-it-yourself decorating provide the staples for some familiar slapstick routines. As if R. D. Laing had never existed, the film trots out all the traditional ingredients of 'harmless' family entertainment, presenting a never-never land in which fathers simulate sternness behind their newspapers but crumble into sentimentality at the first signs of friction, where mothers are always attractive, cheerful and free from housework, and teenage children display a token rebelliousness but are golden-hearted enough to keep the family harmonious and lovable."

The Radio Times Guide to Films gave the film 2/5 stars, writing: "In the 1970s, there was a misguided belief among British film-makers that successful sitcoms could be transferred to the big screen. The majority proved to be huge disappointments, and this was no exception, although it does have the incomparable Sidney James. He is the grouchy father, married to Diana Coupland, who is trying to come to grips with his teenage children and his neighbours. There are more laughs in the naff 1970s fashions than in the script."

British film critic Leslie Halliwell said: "A suburbanite's multifarious frustrations culminate in preparations for his son's wedding. This tedious spin-off from a TV sitcom virtually abandons plot in favour of an endless series of slapstick gags which could have been better presented."

== Sequel ==
A sequel was planned in 1976, but it was immediately cancelled after Sid James's sudden death after collapsing on stage at the Sunderland Empire Theatre of a heart attack on 26 April.
