= You Must Be the Husband =

British BBC sitcom (1987–88)

- Genre: Comedy
- Written by: Colin Bostock-Smith
- Directed by: Richard Boden; John Kilby
- Starring: Tim Brooke-Taylor; Diane Keen; Sheila Steafel; Garfield Morgan
- Country of origin: United Kingdom
- Original language: English
- No. of series: 2
- No. of episodes: 13

Production
- Running time: 30 minutes

Original release
- Network: BBC1
- Release: 8 September 1987 – 4 April 1988

You Must Be the Husband is a British comedy television series starring Tim Brooke-Taylor in the title role of Tom Hammond, and Diane Keen as his wife, Alice Hammond, with Sheila Steafel as Alice's literary agent, Miranda Shaw.

Tom and Alice Hammond are a happily married couple, parents to fraternal twins John and Sarah, who become extremely wealthy when Alice suddenly becomes a best-selling author, much to Tom's surprise and chagrin. The basic plot was based on, and expanded upon, the earlier play "...And I'm The Husband", which Brooke-Taylor and Keen had toured in between 1981 and 1982.

The show ran for two series and 13 episodes on the BBC during 1987-1988 and was repeated in the early 1990s on UK Gold, but has never officially been released on DVD, nor in any digital format.

The title song for the show was the Dave Brubeck track, "Take Five".
