= Rings on Their Fingers =

British TV sitcom (1978–1980)

- Genre: Sitcom
- Created by: Richard Waring
- Starring: Diane Keen; Martin Jarvis; Tim Barrett; Barbara Lott; John Harvey
- Country of origin: United Kingdom
- Original language: English
- No. of series: 3
- No. of episodes: 20

Production
- Producer: Harold Snoad
- Running time: 30 minutes
- Production company: BBC

Original release
- Network: BBC1
- Release: 13 October 1978 – 27 November 1980

Rings on Their Fingers is a British television sitcom, written by Richard Waring. It ran from October 1978 to November 1980.

== Plot ==
It concerns a young unmarried couple (Sandy Bennett and Oliver Pryde) played by Diane Keen and Martin Jarvis. Sandy wishes to marry whereas Oliver is happy to remain unmarried. During the first series they do marry and in the second series they adjust to married life. A proposed fourth series would have concerned Sandy becoming pregnant unexpectedly, and Sandy and Oliver adapting to parenthood, but the series was not re-commissioned.

== Cast ==
Character	Actor
Sandy Bennett/Pryde	Diane Keen
Oliver Pryde	Martin Jarvis
Victor	Tim Barrett
Mr Gordon Bennett	John Harvey
Mrs Bennett	Barbara Lott
Mr Pryde	Keith Marsh

== Episode list ==
=== Series 1 ===
No. in series	Title	Original release date
1	"What Difference Does A Piece of Paper Make?"	13 October 1978
2	"Lead Me to the Altar"	20 October 1978
3	"The Knot"	27 October 1978
4	"Vive La Difference"	3 November 1978
5	"Wholly Deadlock"	10 November 1978
6	"Party Mood"	17 November 1978
7	"Merry Christmas"	23 December 1978

=== Series 2 ===
No. in series	Title	Original release date
1	"Anniversary Jig"	5 September 1979
2	"A Girl About The House"	12 September 1979
3	"Job Lot"	19 September 1979
4	"Home Market"	26 September 1979
5	"Moving Moments"	3 October 1979
6	"Mother's Old – Pastures New"	10 October 1979
7	"Ours Is A Dosshouse – Ours Is"	17 October 1979

=== Series 3 ===
No. in series	Title	Original release date
1	"It's Not The Thought, It's The Gift"	23 October 1980
2	"Friends & Neighbours"	30 October 1980
3	"If You Can't Beat Them..."	6 November 1980
4	"Ladies' Man"	13 November 1980
5	"Home & Away"	20 November 1980
6	"...And Joybells on Their Toes"	27 November 1980

== DVD releases ==
DVD	Release date
The Complete Series 1	21 May 2012
The Complete Series 2	2 July 2012
The Complete Series 3	6 August 2012
The Complete Series 1 to 3 Box Set	3 September 2012

== See also ==
- British sitcom
