= Wilde Alliance =

- Genre: Mystery
- Created by: Ian Mackintosh
- Starring: John Stride; Julia Foster
- Theme music composer: Anthony Isaac
- Country of origin: United Kingdom
- Original language: English
- No. of series: 1
- No. of episodes: 13

Production
- Running time: 50 minutes
- Production company: Yorkshire Television

Original release
- Network: ITV
- Release: 17 January – 11 April 1978

Wilde Alliance is a British television series produced by Yorkshire Television for the ITV network in 1978. The programme was a light-hearted mystery series created by Ian Mackintosh about a husband-and-wife pair of amateur detectives, Rupert and Amy Wilde (played by John Stride and Julia Foster).

Rupert is a crime novelist, while his wife Amy is his PA, as well as being an artist and designer in her own right. They live in a luxurious apartment in an old Manor House in York, but despite this and an enjoyment of the finer things in life, they are sometimes short of money and are often dogged by income tax demands. In one episode they even fly on holiday to Amsterdam (in the episode "Affray in Amsterdam") to spend what little profit they have made on one book just to avoid the tax man. They indulge in their amateur detecting more as a sort of diversion from the everyday stress of working life.

Also helping out at times was Rupert's long suffering literary agent Christopher Bridgewater (played by John Lee), who was often having to chase up Rupert to meet a book deadline, only to be unwillingly dragged into yet another of their mysteries. However, in one episode (Things That Go Bump) it is him who asks the Wildes to investigate after buying an old property he believes to be haunted. The only other semi regular in the series is a fellow tenant of the Manor House called Bailey (played by Patrick Newell), a dapper dandy of a man who runs a secret business in pornography of all aspects (some less than savory), as well as using his own flat to shoot pornographic films, all under the noses of the local police.

The mystery series ran for 13 episodes from January 17 to April 11, 1978, and was a big ratings hit for ITV, consistently making the Top 20, and at one point reached 4th in the ratings with a peak viewing audience of 16.6 million. Despite this, there wasn't a second series, but that may have been due to the sudden and mysterious disappearance of its writer Ian Mackintosh the following year, who along with his girlfriend Susan Insole and friend and pilot Graham Barber went on a flight over the Gulf of Alaska on July 7, 1979, and disappeared. No sign of any of the passengers or any wreckage of the plane has ever been found.

== Cast ==
- Rupert Wilde - John Stride
- Amy Wilde - Julia Foster
- Christopher Bridgewater - John Lee

== Crew ==
- Producer - Ian Mackintosh
- Executive Producer - David Cunliffe
- Theme music - Anthony Isaac

== Episodes ==
No.	Title	Directed by	Written by	Original release date
1	"A Question of Research"	Derek Bennett	Ian Mackintosh	17 January 1978
A woman turns up at the Wildes' apartment to return Rupert's missing wallet, leading to Rupert to hire her as their au pair for the flat. But Amy is suspicious of her, and there are other things to tax their brains - like what is their new neighbour up to in his flat? And why has someone planted a listening device in their home? Guest Stars: Patrick Newell, Judy Buxton, Donald Burton, Robert Blythe, Robin Parkinson, Sebastian Abineri and Raymond Adamson
2	"Flower Power"	Bob Hird	Anthony Skene	24 January 1978
Amy is invited to a private party held by the elderly Mrs Tegaskis, who asks the guests if they would support a campaign for a natural lake to be built in the area. Rupert is suspicious, but Amy is more intrigued by the guest that turned up halfway through the party but wasn't seen... Guest Stars: Ambrosine Phillpotts, James Villiers, June Ellis and Mary Wimbush
3	"Too Much Too Often"	Derek Bennett	Philip Broadley	31 January 1978
The Wildes are invited by their friend Helen Bardsley to stay over at their country retreat, along with a couple of friends. But over the weekend Helen's boorish husband David becomes increasingly erratic and dangerous - only for him then to suddenly disappear... Guest Stars: Isla Blair, John Castle, Tony Steedman, Brian Osborne and Lyndon Hughes
4	"Things That Go Bump"	Marc Miller	Philip Broadley	7 February 1978
Rupert's agent Christopher contacts the couple to investigate the new property he has bought in the country, convinced it is haunted. During the time he was there he heard strange footsteps, an odd "throbbing" noise and encountered a young girl in the study who later disappeared. Ever the sceptic, the Wildes decide to investigate further. Guest Stars: Janina Faye, Marius Goring, Sean Arnold, Laura Graham and Peter Birrel
5	"The Private Army of Colonel Stone"	Matthew Robinson	Jacques Gillies	14 February 1978
When a soldier moves into her recently deceased son's cottage in the country, Rachel Somerville calls on Rupert and Amy to investigate. It seems that Colonel Stone was one of a group of men with her son out in South West Africa when he died while diamond hunting, and tells the couple her son Jamie left him the property as a gift. But the Wildes are suspicious of his story and begin to wonder just how Jamie met his end... Guest Stars: John Fraser, Hilary Mason, Anthony Dutton and Philip McGough
6	"Danny Boy"	Bob Hird	Ian Mackintosh	21 February 1978
In Manchester to meet a film producer who wants to adapt one of Rupert's novels, the couple are fascinated by a sinister looking gentleman in a diner who requests the violinist play "Danny Boy". The next day Rupert spots the stranger watching the arrival of pop singer Carol Fortune at the airport, and when he spots him following her about Rupert fears for her safety. Guest Stars: Ed Bishop, Jacquie Sullivan, Leon Lissek, Patrick Jordan and David King
7	"Well Enough Alone"	David Reynolds	Anthony Skene	28 February 1978
The foreign translator of Rupert's novels in Spain turns up at their house. Her daughter Maria came to England to study at a music college in Harrogate nearly a year ago, but when she turned up at the college to visit her she is told that her daughter has never been there. But someone has been regularly collecting her mail... Guest Stars: Caroline Blakiston, Zienia Merton, Desmond Llewelyn, Geoffrey Burridge, Margot Boyd, Edward de Souza, Karan David and Roger Brierley
8	"Express from Rome"	Marc Miller	Philip Broadley	7 March 1978
Travelling on the train from Italy, the Wildes discover a woman in their cabin, only to be told that they have the wrong compartment. However, when they move to a different cabin they find their peaceful journey home is anything but! Guest Stars: David Swift, John Barrard, April Walker, Tony Anholt, Peter Welch, Alexander Davion, Madeleine Hinde, Trevor Ray and John Rees
9	"A Game for Two Players"	David Reynolds	John Bowen	14 March 1978
Rupert picks up a young boy hitchhiking on the motorway. He is looking for his mother, who disappeared suddenly one day when she left with a man crying. All he has for her location is a postcard with a picture of York Minster on it... Guest Stars: Patrick Newell, Daragh O'Malley, Maggie Jones, Jeff Rawle, David Corti, Cherith Mellor and Spencer Banks
10	"Time and Again"	Marc Miller	Anthony Skene	21 March 1978
Rupert gives a lecture at a prison, but upon returning home discovers a manuscript that has been planted in his bag. And it seems that someone is very eager to get their hands on it as later that night the Wildes apartment is ransacked... Guest Stars: Anthony Bate, Diana Coupland, Alan Bennion, Freddie Earlle, Richard Shaw, Roy Hanlon, Hugh Walters and Victor Brooks
11	"Affray in Amsterdam"	David Reynolds	Philip Broadley	28 March 1978
The Wildes take a holiday to Amsterdam for 'economic reasons', but almost immediately find themselves in a mystery when Rupert discovers a mysterious woman hiding in their hotel room. She tells him she is hiding from a man following her, but runs off before he can find out more. But later Rupert is knocked out in his room. What is going on? Guest Stars: Diane Keen, Christopher Benjamin, John Bryans, Paul Lavers, John F Landry, Damien Thomas, Hugh Morton and Maya Woolfe
12	"A Suspicion of Sudden Death"	Leonard Lewis	Jacques Gillies	4 April 1978
Rupert and Amy attend the funeral of crime novelist Will Carpenter, who apparently died of a heart attack. But something just doesn't seem right when they later attend the wake at the house - especially when they discover his wife was widowed once before. Unable to contain their unease, the couple decide to dig deeper... Guest Stars: Philip Stone, Moira Redmond, John Ringham, Cyril Shaps, Ruth Trouncer and Peter Schofield
13	"Some Trust in Chariots"	Derek Bennett	Ian Mackintosh	11 April 1978
Amy receives a letter from her friend Debbie Stewart, who is convinced she is going out of her mind. She keeps hearing voices in the house of her sister Annette, but she lives in America. Then she sees her in the garden and takes photos of her, but when she goes to develop the film all images of Annette have disappeared... Guest Stars: Patrick Newell, Mela White, Mark Eden and Pat Ashley

== DVD release ==
The complete series is available on DVD in the UK.
