= Diane Keen =

English actress (born 1946)

- Born: 29 July 1946 (age 80); London, England
- Occupation: Actress
- Years active: 1967–present
- Spouses: Paul Greenwood (m. 1969; div. 1979) Neil Zeiger (m. 1981; div. 1993)
- Children: 1

Diane Keen (born 29 July 1946) is an English actress. With a career spanning decades, she has appeared in television series, films and stage productions. Keen's notable roles include Fliss Hawthorne in the Granada sitcom The Cuckoo Waltz, Sandy Bennett in Rings on Their Fingers, Jenny Burden in The Ruth Rendell Mysteries and Julia Parsons on the BBC soap opera Doctors. Keen also appeared in Nescafé advertisements from 1980 to 1989.

== Early life ==
Keen was born in London on 29 July 1946. She grew up in East Africa, principally Tanganyika and later Kenya, where her father was a civil engineer. She attended boarding school and returned to Britain at the age of 19, where she became a secretary for The Ivy League's fan club; this led to her releasing a 45 r.p.m. single of "Sally Go 'Round the Roses" (credited as Dee King) on the Piccadilly label in 1966.

== Career ==
Keen was a regular on television during the 1970s and early 1980s, starring in long-running sitcoms such as The Cuckoo Waltz, Rings on Their Fingers, Shillingbury Tales and You Must Be the Husband, and in two runs of the Thames Television children's historical costume drama The Feathered Serpent. She also guest-starred in many shows, including The Morecambe and Wise Show, and featured as Laura Dickens in the spy drama The Sandbaggers.

Keen played Sandra Gould in Crossroads from 1968 to 1971. She featured in the film Here We Go Round the Mulberry Bush (1968) as Judy Geeson's university student friend, Claire, and appeared in an episode of Budgie as Barbara. She appeared full frontal nude, in The Sex Thief (1973), playing Judy Marvin and topless in the feature film Sweeney!, the 1977 cinema spin-off from the 1970s ITV detective series The Sweeney. Keen starred as Elisabeth of Austria-Hungary ("Sissi") in episode one of the ITV, 13-part series Fall of Eagles (1974), and played Hilda in The Professionals series 1 episode Killer With a Long Arm in 1978. In 1980, she appeared as widowed restaurant owner Christina in Series 1 episode The Dessert Song of Minder. She went on to star with David Jason in A Touch of Frost.

Keen starred in a series of advertisements for Nescafé coffee from 1980 to 1989 and made an appearance in an episode of Taggart in 1987. In the next decade, she became a regular in The Ruth Rendell Mysteries series, playing the wife of Inspector Wexford's D.I. Roles in Brookside and several other television series followed, including New Tricks.

Keen was then a series regular in the BBC soap opera Doctors, playing practice manager Julia Parsons from 2003 to 2012. She reprised this role in March 2020 for a short stint. For her portrayal of Julia, Keen was annually nominated for the British Soap Award for Best Actress between the 2005 and 2010 British Soap Awards. She was nominated for Best Actress again in 2012. She also won in the Actress category at the 2008 RTS Midlands Awards.

Keen has appeared onstage, including in the Alan Ayckbourn play Absent Friends at the Bristol Old Vic, and in two acclaimed tours of Same Time, Next Year. In 2015 she appeared with Graham Cole in Steve Wood's You're Never Too Old. In 2013, she co-starred in a British tour of The Vagina Monologues. A year later, she appeared in a stage production of thriller play The Small Mind, adapted from the novel by Susan Hill. In 2020, Keen appeared in the short film The Wedding Ring. The film was written specifically for Keen to star in from her home, due to the Impact of the COVID-19 pandemic on cinema. In 2023, she was cast in a production of Home, I'm Darling that toured across the UK.

== Personal life ==
Keen has one daughter, Melissa, by her marriage to Paul Greenwood, which ended in divorce in 1979. Her granddaughter, Siena Pugsley, played the role of her granddaughter, Chloe McGuire, in Doctors. In September 2023, Keen announced via her Twitter (X) account that she had suffered a "Catastrophic Stroke" and that she was lucky to be alive.

== Filmography ==
=== Film ===
Year	Title	Role	Notes
1968	Here We Go Round the Mulberry Bush	Claire	
1969	Popdown	Miss 1970	
1970	Toomorrow	Music Student	Uncredited
1973	The Sex Thief	Judy Marvin	
1977	Sweeney!	Bianca Hamilton	
1980	Silver Dream Racer	Tina Freeman	
2001	Nowhere in Africa	Mrs. Rubens	
2020	The Wedding Ring	Hylda	Short film

=== Television ===
Year	Title	Role	Notes
1967	Love Story	Lucy	Episode: "A Dream in the Afternoon"
1967	The Wednesday Play	Judy	Episode: "Fall of the Goat"
1968	The Root of All Evil?	Susan	Episode: "The Right Attitude?"
1969–1970	The Morecambe & Wise Show	Dolly Bird	Recurring role
1970–1971	Crossroads	Sandra Gould	Guest role
1972	Budgie	Sheila	Guest role
1972	The Two Ronnies	Brenda Brimstone	Recurring role
1972	Emmerdale	Receptionist	1 episode
1972, 1974	Crown Court	Mrs. Bryant / Elizabeth Field	2 episodes
1973	The Pathfinders	Nurse	Episode: "In the Face of the Enemy"
1973	Country Matters	Girl in Office	Episode: "The Little Farm"
1974	Fall of Eagles	Young Sisi	Episode: "Death Waltz"
1974	Armchair Cinema	Mina	Episode: "The Prison"
1974	Softly, Softly: Task Force	Susan Gleaner	Episode: "Alert"
1975	Public Eye	Nina	Episode: "They All Sound Simple at First"
1975	You're on Your Own	Marie Le Strange	Episode: "Value for Money"
1975	Spy Trap	Deborah Ann Lees	Episode: "Distant Relations"
1975–1980	The Cuckoo Waltz	Fliss Hawthorne	Main role
1975	The Legend of Robin Hood	Lady Marion	Main role
1976–1978	The Feathered Serpent	Princess Chimalma	Main role
1977	Holding On	Yvette	1 episode
1978	The Professionals	Hilda	Episode: "Killer with a Long Arm"
1978	Wilde Alliance	Estelle	Episode: "Affray in Amsterdam"
1978–1980	Rings on Their Fingers	Sandy Bennett	Main role
1978	The Sandbaggers	Laura Dickens	Recurring role
1978	Return of the Saint	Christine Hanson	Episode: "The Debt Collectors"
1980	The Shillingbury Blowers	Sally	Television film
1980	Minder	Christina	Episode: "The Dessert Song"
1980–1981	Shillingbury Tales	Sally Higgins	Main role
1981	Take the Stage	—N/a	1 episode
1982	Playhouse	Jacky	Episode: "The Reunion"
1982–1984	Foxy Lady	Daisy Jackson	Main role
1984	Killer Waiting	Kate Greenwood	Television film
1984	Oxbridge Blues	Carlotta / Sherry Craven	2 episodes
1985	Thirteen at Dinner	Jenny Driver	Television film
1986	If Tomorrow Comes	Silvana Luadi	1 episode
1987	Boon	Linda West	Episode: "Special Delivery"
1987	Taggart	Ruth Wilson	Episode: "Cold Blood"
1987–1988	You Must Be the Husband	Alice Hammond	Main role
1990	Jekyll & Hyde	Annabel	Television film
1990–1992, 1996, 1998, 2000	The Ruth Rendell Mysteries	Jenny Burden	Main role
1993	Crime Story	Ann Eaton	Episode: "The White House Farm Murders"
1994	Noel's House Party	Woman at the Window	1 episode
1994	September Song	Connie French	Main role
1994	The Bill	Janet Hurst	Episode: "Birthright"
1995	The Detectives	Mary	Episode: "D.C. of Love"
1997	A Touch of Frost	Janet	Episode: "No Other Love"
1997–1998	Brookside	Molly Marchbank	Recurring role
1999, 2001	Family Affairs	Joyce Neville	Guest role
2000	City Central	Helen Allen	Episode: "Half Man Half Cop"
2003–2012, 2020	Doctors	Julia Parsons	Regular role
2004	The Deputy	Hilary Galway	Television film
2004	Judas	Mary, Mother of Jesus	Television film
2006	New Street Law	Sandra Wilson	1 episode
2012	Crime Stories	Helen Sutton	Episode: "Family"
2013	New Tricks	Cynthia Caldwell	Episode: "Wild Justice"
