= Perfect crime (disambiguation) =

A perfect crime is a crime committed with sufficient planning and skill that no evidence is apparent, and the culprit cannot be traced.

Perfect crime(s) or The Perfect Crime may also refer to:

== Film, television and theatre ==
- A Perfect Crime (film), a 1921 American silent comedy film
- The Perfect Crime (1928 film), an American silent film
- Perfect Crime (1937 film), a British crime film
- The Perfect Crime (1978 film), an Italian giallo-crime film
- The Perfect Crime (2004 film), or Crimen Ferpecto, a Spanish black comedy film
- A Perfect Crime (TV series), a 2020 German docuseries
- Perfect Crimes, or Fallen Angels, a 1993–1995 American TV series
- Perfect Crime (play), a 1987 play by Warren Manzi

== Music ==
- Perfect Crime (band), an early-1980s Northern Irish band formed by Gregory Gray
- The Perfect Crime (Anti-Nowhere League album), 1987
- "Perfect Crime", a song by Rocky Burnette used in the movies Born to Race (1988) and Speed Zone (1989).
- "Perfect Crime", a song by Guns N' Roses from Use Your Illusion I, 1991
- "The Perfect Crime", a song by Faith No More from Bill & Ted's Bogus Journey: Music from the Motion Picture, 1991
- Perfect Crime (album) or the title song, by Mai Kuraki, 2001
- "The Perfect Crime No. 2", a song by the Decemberists, 2006
- The Perfect Crime (Cold Chisel album) or the title song, 2015
- "Perfect Crime", a song by Nause, 2019
- "Perfect Crime", a song by Tinashe from Songs for You, 2019
- "Perfect Crime", a song by Karlee, a former Dream Academy contestant, 2024

== Others ==
- The Perfect Crime, a paper by legal scholar Brian C. Kalt exploring a loophole in the US constitution

== See also ==
- Perfect murder (disambiguation)
