= Yashar Adem =

British Turkish actor (1940–2014)

- Born: 22 August 1940; Geunyeli, Nicosia, British Cyprus
- Died: 5 December 2014 (aged 74); Hammersmith, London, England
- Years active: 1965–1988

Yashar Adem (22 August 1940 – 5 December 2014) was a British Turkish actor.

== Biography ==
Watching movies as a young boy at his local cinema, Adem decided he wanted to become an actor. However, his wealthy parents had other plans for him, envisaging him going to Cambridge University to qualify as an architect. At the age of 17, Adem's father had found a 16-year-old girl from a neigbouring wealthy family for him to wed in an arranged marriage. Following the customs, the boy went with his mother to visit the girl at her house only to discover she was out and in annoyance, told his mother to keep the ring he had bought and the girl too. Afterwards, he was soundly beaten by his father for his pains.

Rebelling, Adem ran away to England, studying English and then drama at the Royal Academy of Dramatic Art. In the process, he was cut off by his family, his father never forgiving him.

On leaving RADA, Adem began to work in film and television but in 1966, the work began to dry up. In desperation, he was forced to sell his car, motorbike and flat and take up different jobs including being a barman, lorry driver, mechanic and domestic work. After two years, the work picked up, so he was able to resume his acting career.

== Filmography ==
Year	Title	Role	Notes
1965	Danger Man	Driver	Episode: "Judgement Day"
1968	The Jazz Age	Sergeant	Episode: "The Outstation"
1968-1969	The Troubleshooters	Policeman / Major Atami	2 episodes
1969	Boy Meets Girl	Mahmoud	Episode: "Across the Frontier"
1973	Two Women	Moroccan soldier	1 episode
1973	Warship	Arab Officer	Episode: "A Standing and Jumping War"
1975	Dixon of Dock Green	Kumal	Episode: "Target"
1975	The Return of the Pink Panther	Museum Guard	
1975	Softly Softly	Hamil	Episode: "Bargains"
1977	The Spy Who Loved Me	Stromberg Two captain	
1978	Midnight Express	Airport Police Chief	
1978	The Thief of Baghdad	Man in Snake	TV movie
1978	The Professionals	1st Official	Episode: "Blind Run"
1979	Play for Today	Rifat Bey	Episode: "The Network"
1980	The Sandbaggers	Aziz	Episode: "Decision by Committee"
1980	The Enigma Files	Hussein Essif	Episode: "The Full Flying Carpet Treatment"
1981	Sphinx	Sergeant	
1983	The Nation's Health	Hassad	Episode: "Chronic"
1983	The Keep	Carlos	
1985	Dempsey and Makepeace	Yassouf Kerim	Episode: "Nowhere to Run"
1988	Hawks	Bouncers and Clients #5	(final film role)
