= The Best Pair of Legs in the Business =

1973 British film by Christopher Hodson

- Directed by: Christopher Hodson
- Screenplay by: Kevin Laffan
- Story by: Kevin Laffan
- Produced by: Andrew Mitchell; Johnny Goodman
- Starring: Reg Varney; Diana Coupland; Lee Montague
- Cinematography: Jimmy Allen
- Edited by: Richard Best
- Music by: Harry Robinson
- Production company: Sunny Productions
- Distributed by: Anglo-EMI Film Distributors (UK)
- Release date: 9 February 1973 (UK)
- Running time: 88 minutes
- Country: United Kingdom
- Language: English

The Best Pair of Legs in the Business is a 1973 British comedy-drama film directed by Christopher Hodson and starring Reg Varney, Diana Coupland and Lee Montague. The screenplay was by Kevin Laffan, adapted from his episode of the TV series ITV Playhouse, also directed by Hodson and starring Varney, transmitted on 28 December 1968.

A washed-up comic and female impersonator at a holiday camp faces an uncertain future.

== Plot ==
Sherry Sheridan's career is dying. He is tolerated rather than valued at the holiday camp. His wife Mary is having an affair with the outgoing camp manager who tries to persuade her to leave with him. Every time she is about to, something happens to prevent it.

Sherry's agent drops him. He drinks heavily. The only people who show him any form of affection are two holidaying girls who prefer him to two randy boys.

His estranged son Alan turns up in an attempt to heal relations, and invites his father to meet his fiancée and her parents. To everyon'e embarrassment, Sherry attempts to puff himself up as a big shot entertainer who knows the Queen. Having disgraced himself, he returns to the holiday camp alone.

The two jilted boys find Sherry peeping into the caravan window of the two girls, who are undressing. They throw him in the swimming pool where he protests that he cannot swim. He is rescued by his son and they reconcile.

== Cast ==
- Reg Varney as Sherry Sheridan
- Diana Coupland as Mary Sheridan
- Lee Montague as Charlie Green
- Jean Harvey as Emma Cooper
- David Lincoln as Ron
- George Sweeney as Dai
- Clare Sutcliffe as Glad
- Penny Spencer as Eunice
- Michael Hadley as Alan Sheridan
- Bill Dean as Bert
- Reginald Marsh as Fred
- Karen Kessey as May
- Johnny Briggs as Millet
- Geoffrey Chater as Reverend Thorn
- Clare Kelly as Mrs Thorn
- Jane Seymour as Kim Thorn
- Jenny Thompson as Edna Pilbeam
- Claire Davenport as eating lady
- Claire Shenstone as 1st chemist
- Jane Cardew as 2nd chemist
- Preston Lockwood as 3rd chemist

== Production ==
The film was part financed by EMI who had released the successful On the Buses films with Varney. It was shot at EMI-MGM Elstree Studios, Borehamwood, Hertfordshire, and on location in Hertfordshire and West Sussex. The holiday camp location was Riverside Caravan Centre in Bognor Regis.

== Music ==
A 7" single was issued to promote the film: "Best Pair Of Legs In The Business" (Harry Robinson) b/w "Come On And Tickle My Fancy" (Robinson/Joseph Pierre Connor) – Columbia, DB 8977, 1973.

== Critical reception ==
Clyde Jeavons wrote in The Monthly Film Bulletin: "In adapting his sixty-minute television play for the larger screen and a longer running time, Kevin Laffan has managed both to broaden and coarsen it, with the result that its central theme – the bitterness of the burnt-out comic – has shifted frustratingly out of focus. In order to excite compassion, 'Sherry' Sheridan (the Archie Rice of the Butlin belt) should, like Osborne's seedy hero, hold the stage in every sense; instead, the film dissipates our involvement with him by over-indulging some misguided attempts at humorous social observation. ... Backed by some quietly expert playing from Diana Coupland and Lee Montague, the film's one redeeming feature is Reg Varney's there-but-for-the-grace-of-God performance in the role he created on television. The part is clearly tailor-made; and whether he is camping it up for the campers, sagging like a sack behind the scenes or fantasising about his mythical Royal Command appearance, he manages – wherever script and direction allow – to be both more moving and more convincing than even Olivier in the Osborne role."

The Radio Times Guide to Films gave the film 1/5 stars, writing: "Taking a break from the buses, Reg Varney finds himself at a holiday camp in this old-fashioned seaside comedy. Although he's the world's worst entertainer, our Reg is convinced that the big time is just a soft-shoe shuffle away. A trouper through and through, Varney always tries to make the most of even the lowest grade material, yet even he struggles to pep up this maudlin mess."

In ABC Film Review, Vincent Firth wrote: "I honestly felt that Varney’s Sherry was superior to Olivier’s Archie, and that I was witnessing the arrival of a great character actor who would seem to have a tremendous future in emotional and finely-balanced portrayals."

Marjorie Bilbow in CinemaTV Today said the film was: "too sombre for Reg Varney’s fans to accept if they come prepared for belly laughs. Audiences that are not misled may react more favourably".

Matthew Kerry wrote in The Holiday and British Film: "The film not only includes a central character who is suffering from a crisis of identity, but the film itself (and its promotional material) also arguably communicate confusing messages about what kind of audience it is trying to reach."

== Home media ==
The film was released on DVD by Network in 2013, comprising the film in its original cinema format, the theatrical trailer, an image gallery and original promotional material. The original ITV Playhouse production was included as an extra in the 2012 Network DVD box set On the Buses as The Complete Omnibus Edition.
