= Brian Osborne =

English actor (1940–2021)

- Born: 26 March 1940; Bath, Somerset, England, U.K.
- Died: 8 July 2021 (aged 81); Gran Canaria, Spain
- Occupation: Actor
- Years active: 1962-2003
- Known for: Upstairs, Downstairs; The Sandbaggers

Brian Osborne (26 March 1940 – 8 July 2021) was an English actor. He was best known for his roles in Upstairs, Downstairs and The Sandbaggers. Osborne also had minor roles in six Carry On films as well the TV series Carry On Laughing.

== Early life ==
Brian Osborne was born in 1940 in Bath, Somerset. He started acting while at school. Later he toured school with a children's theatre company and he played The Pied Piper of Hamelin. His first television role was in 1966 in an episode of Softly, Softly. After this he toured Europe and the United States with the Royal Shakespeare Company, as well as having roles in Bless This House and Follyfoot.

== 1970s and 1980s ==
In 1971, Brian Osborne secured the role of Pearce, the coachman, in the period drama Upstairs, Downstairs. This role did not play a large part in the programme and Pearce left Eaton Place in the programme's second series in 1972. In the same year, Osborne was in Carry On Matron. This was the first of six Carry On appearances, the others being Carry On Abroad, Carry On Girls, Carry On Dick, Carry On Behind and Carry On England. In addition, he appeared in seven episodes of the TV series Carry On Laughing. In 1973, he appeared in an episode of Some Mothers Do 'Ave 'Em and in 1976 appeared in an episode of Space: 1999. From 1978 to 1980 he played Sam Lawes in six episodes of Cold War drama The Sandbaggers.

In the 1980s, Osborne had many minor roles on television, including in Tales of the Unexpected, Minder (as Joe Harrison, episode Get Daley!, 1983), Shine on Harvey Moon, The Bill, Sorry!, Juliet Bravo, Casualty and Lord Peter Wimsey. His other film roles included Under Milk Wood (1971), Bless This House (1972), Nighthawks (1981), Haunters of the Deep (1984) and Last Orders (2001).

== Personal life ==
Osborne relocated to Gran Canaria in 2020 to be with family. He died there in July 2021 at the age of 81.

== Filmography ==
=== Film ===
Year	Title	Role	Notes
1969	Women in Love	Miner	Uncredited
1972	Under Milk Wood	Second Fisherman	
1972	Carry On Matron	Ambulance Driver	
1972	Bless This House	Removal Van Driver	
1972	Carry On Abroad	Stall-Holder	
1973	Carry On Girls	First Citizen	
1974	Carry On Dick	Browning	
1975	Carry On Behind	Bob	
1976	Carry On England	Gunner Owen	
1979	Are You Being Served?	Airport Security Guard	Uncredited
1979	Black Island	Police Sergeant	
1981	Nighthawks	Inspector Orchard	
1984	Haunters of the Deep	Mr. Holman	
1988	Across the Lake	Maurie Parfitt	
2001	Last Orders	Tally Man	

=== Television ===
Year	Title	Role	Notes
1973	Pardon My Genie	P.C. Davidson	Episode: "Your Present Is Required"
1976	Space: 1999	Chris Potter	Episode: "A Matter of Balance"
1977	Odd Man Out	Taxi Driver; Hotel Porter	Episode: "A Chip Off the Old Block"; Episode: "Ooh La La"
1978	Enemy at the Door	Inspector Sculpher	Episode: "By Order of the Fuhrer"
1978	Wilde Alliance	Tom	Episode: "Too Much, Too Often"
1978	The Law Centre	Desk Sergeant	Episode: "The Galahad Bit"
