= Ian Mackintosh =

British Royal Navy officer and writer

Ian Mackintosh MBE
- Born: Hamish Ian Mackintosh; 26 July 1940; Inverness, Inverness-shire, Scotland, UK
- Disappeared: 7 July 1979 (aged 38); Gulf of Alaska, Alaska, US
- Status: Presumed dead
- Education: Inverness Royal Academy; Britannia Royal Naval College
- Occupations: Author, Royal Navy officer
- Spouse: Sharron Carter
- Children: 2
- Military career
- Allegiance: United Kingdom
- Branch: Royal Navy
- Service years: 1958–1976
- Rank: Lieutenant Commander

Lieutenant Commander Hamish Ian Mackintosh, MBE (26 July 1940 – disappeared 7 July 1979) was a Scottish Royal Navy officer, a writer of thriller novels, and a screenwriter for British television.

== Early life, education and family ==
Ian Mackintosh was born on 26 July 1940 to Annie (née Lawrie) and James Mackintosh. He was born in Inverness but raised primarily in Tain, a small town in the Scottish Highlands. His mother was a governess and his father was an officer in the Royal Navy. Educated at Inverness Royal Academy, Mackintosh initially applied to join the Fleet Air Arm as a pilot but was rejected due to poor eyesight; a subsequent application to join the Royal Air Force was also rejected for the same reason. After spending an additional year at school, Mackintosh applied for entry to Britannia Royal Naval College in 1958 to train as a Royal Navy officer and was accepted. In September 1969, he married Sharron Carter, daughter of another Royal Navy officer, and they had two daughters; they subsequently divorced.

== Career ==
Mackintosh's first novel, A Slaying in September, was published in 1967. He wrote four other original novels between 1967 and 1970; his later books were either based on his television series or were novelizations of televised episodes of his television series.

Whilst serving as a Royal Navy officer, Mackintosh co-created the popular and acclaimed BBC television drama series Warship (1973–1977) and wrote several of its episodes. It was set on board the fictional HMS Hero (F42), which was portrayed by the real Leander-class frigate HMS Phoebe. Mackintosh was appointed a Member of the Order of the British Empire in the 1976 Birthday Honours on his retirement from the navy. Following the end of Warship he switched to Yorkshire Television, creating and writing most of the episodes of Wilde Alliance, Thundercloud, and The Sandbaggers.

== Disappearance ==
On the evening of 7 July 1979, Mackintosh was flying with two others (his girlfriend, Susan Insole, and British Airways captain Graham Barber, who was the pilot) over the Gulf of Alaska in a light aircraft. The plane sent out a distress signal, which was picked up by the United States Coast Guard. The plane's last-known position was searched, but no wreckage of the plane was ever found and its passengers have not been heard from since.

== Bibliography ==
- Mackintosh, Ian. (1978). The Sandbaggers. Corgi Children's.

== See also ==
- List of people who disappeared mysteriously at sea
