= Dennis Burgess =

British actor

- Born: 18 February 1926; Neath, Glamorgan, Wales
- Died: 3 November 1980 (aged 54); Hemel Hempstead, Hertfordshire, England
- Occupations: Film actor Television actor
- Years active: 1972 - 1980

Dennis Burgess (18 February 1926 – 3 November 1980) was a British television actor born in Neath, Glamorgan, Wales. He is perhaps best remembered for his roles as Hercule Flambeau in Father Brown (1974) and C in The Sandbaggers (1980).

== Biography ==
In 1926, Burgess was born in Neath, in Wales.

Burgess grew up in Port Talbot, attending Port Talbot Secondary School.

In 1958, Burgess married Glenys Maria Hare at Neath.

Burgess worked as a drama teacher for most of his adult life. He dedicated a lot of his time to helping his father care for his invalid mother, and it wasn't until after she had died that Burgess became a professional actor.

In 1973, at 47 years of age, Burgess moved from Wales to the south east of England to focus on his acting career. His first professional role was in the film Bluebeard (1972), starring his boyhood friend Richard Burton, who had helped him into the profession. Burton and Burgess had remained great friends, and a series of letters written by the screen legend to his old friend have previously been exhibited at the National Library of Wales at Aberystwyth. They included an invitation to Burton's 50th birthday party in 1975, from his then wife Elizabeth Taylor.

Burgess went on to feature in The Professionals, The Sandbaggers, and The Elephant Man, and played the recurring role of Flambeau in Father Brown.

=== Death ===
His second career was to be a short one. On the evening of 3 November 1980, at age 54, Dennis Burgess was driving to his home in Chesham when he suffered a massive heart attack and veered off the road. He was found dead at the wheel of his car, in the middle of a cricket pitch, in Hemel Hempstead, Hertfordshire, England.

== Filmography ==
Film
Year	Title	Role	Notes
1972	Bluebeard	The Coroner	
1973	Massacre in Rome	Maj. Dobbrick	
1980	The Elephant Man	1st Committee Man	
Television
Year	Title	Role	Notes
1974	Father Brown	Hercule Flambeau	5 episodes
1975	Space: 1999	Neman	1 episode (Mission Of The Darians)
1978	Within These Walls	Mr. Linton	2 episodes
1978	Off to Philadelphia in the Morning	Sir William Crawley	1 episode
1980	Fox	Mr. Pegram	2 episodes
1979-1980	The Professionals	Galbraith / Dr. Forbes	2 episodes
1980	The Sandbaggers	'C' / Tower Gibbs	8 episodes
1981	Triangle	George Terson	10 episodes
