= Barbara Lott =

British actress (1920–2002)

- Born: Barbara Dulcie Lott; 15 May 1920; Richmond upon Thames, England
- Died: 19 December 2002 (aged 82); London, England
- Spouse: Stuart Latham (m. 1940; died 1993)

Barbara Dulcie Lott (15 May 1920 – 19 December 2002) was a British actress who played Phyllis Lumsden in the BBC television sitcom Sorry!. She also appeared in Coronation Street, Rings on Their Fingers, Survivors, Z-Cars, and as Rona's auntie Pearl in the BBC television sitcom 2point4 Children, amongst others.

== Early life ==
Lott was born on 15 May 1920 in Richmond upon Thames, Surrey. Her father, William Lott, was an executive at Ealing Studios and Lott appeared in small roles in films as a child. She studied acting at the Royal Academy of Dramatic Art, graduating in 1937 and joining repertory theatre. In 1940, she married Stuart Latham, who was later a producer of Coronation Street.

== Career ==
Lott eventually made her London stage debut in Love for Love at the Haymarket Theatre in 1944. Her first television appearance was as Viola in Twelfth Night in 1950 and she went on to appear frequently on television in small roles. In 1978, she was cast in her first major role in Rings on Their Fingers, in 1981 in Sorry! and in 1992 in an occasional role in 2point4 Children. She appeared in several films, most notably as Ewan McGregor's mother in The Pillow Book.

== Death ==
Lott died on 19 December 2002 in London, aged 82.

== Television roles ==
Year	Title	Role
1956	Jesus of Nazareth	Mary Magdalene
1964	The Ordeal of Richard Feverel	Lady Blandish
1972	War and Peace	Nadia Galenkova
1975	Ballet Shoes	Nana
1977	Survivors	Edith
1978 to 1980	Rings on Their Fingers	Mrs Bennett
1981 to 1988	Sorry!	Phyllis Lumsden
1983	The All Electric Amusement Arcade	Mrs Thomsett
1991 to 1999	2point4 Children	Auntie Pearl
15 November 2000	The Remorseful Day (Inspector Morse)	Mrs Bayley
2001 to 2003	Doc Martin	Justine Walker

== Selected filmography ==
- Let's Be Famous (1939) – Sophie the telephonist (uncredited)
- Three Silent Men (1940) – Nurse
- Brighton Rock (1948) – (uncredited)
- Dilemma (1962) – Nun
- The World Ten Times Over (1963) – Bob's PA (uncredited)
- The Party's Over (1965) – Almoner
- Unman, Wittering and Zigo (1971) – Mrs. Winstanley
- Electric Moon (1992) – Mrs. Ellis
- The Pillow Book (1996) – Jerome's Mother
