= Mecca Dance Hall, Tottenham =

Coordinates: 51.5907°N 0.0704°W

The Mecca Dance Hall was an entertainment venue in Tottenham, London, England.

The building was first opened as a roller skating rink in 1910, and the following year was refitted as the Canadian Rink Cinema. In 1925 it was converted into a dance hall known as the Tottenham Palais and became a popular jazz venue. Later it was bought by Mecca Leisure Group and became the Tottenham Royal, managed by William McLeish. North London's premier nightspot for big band and swing music, with the Johnny Howard Band as resident for a period. The 1950s saw the Royal embrace the rock and roll era and there is a well-known photograph in Picture Post of a group of Teddy Boys in the dance hall. There was also a publicity shot taken outside the Royal when the Tottenham Hotspur League and Cup double team showed off their medals during a victory parade down the High Road in 1961. Throughout the 1960s bands such as the Dave Clark Five (based there), the Troggs, The Who and The Animals played at the Royal and the Kray twins were among the more notorious visitors. It had also become a modern style disco playing R and B music from America, Ska from Jamaica, as well as the latest pop hits.

By the 1970s Tottenham had one of Europe’s biggest black communities and the Royal was host to regular soul and reggae nights as the dance hall became a focal point for local black youths (along with Club Noreik at Ward's Corner at the junction of Seven Sisters Road and Tottenham High Road) with many reggae stars such as Desmond Dekker and Gregory Isaacs making appearances. In the mid 1970s Tottenham Royal, together with the nearby Charlie Brown's nightclub, plus other clubs such as Crackers in Wardour Street, were all part of the up-and-coming British disco and Southern Soul dance scene, with disco music interspersed with the swing music of Glenn Miller. This was a real multi-cultural experience with white and black youths attending just for the music and to dance. The 1980s saw a transformation into a string of new identities including the Mayfair Suite, the Temple, the United Nations Club, and the Zone

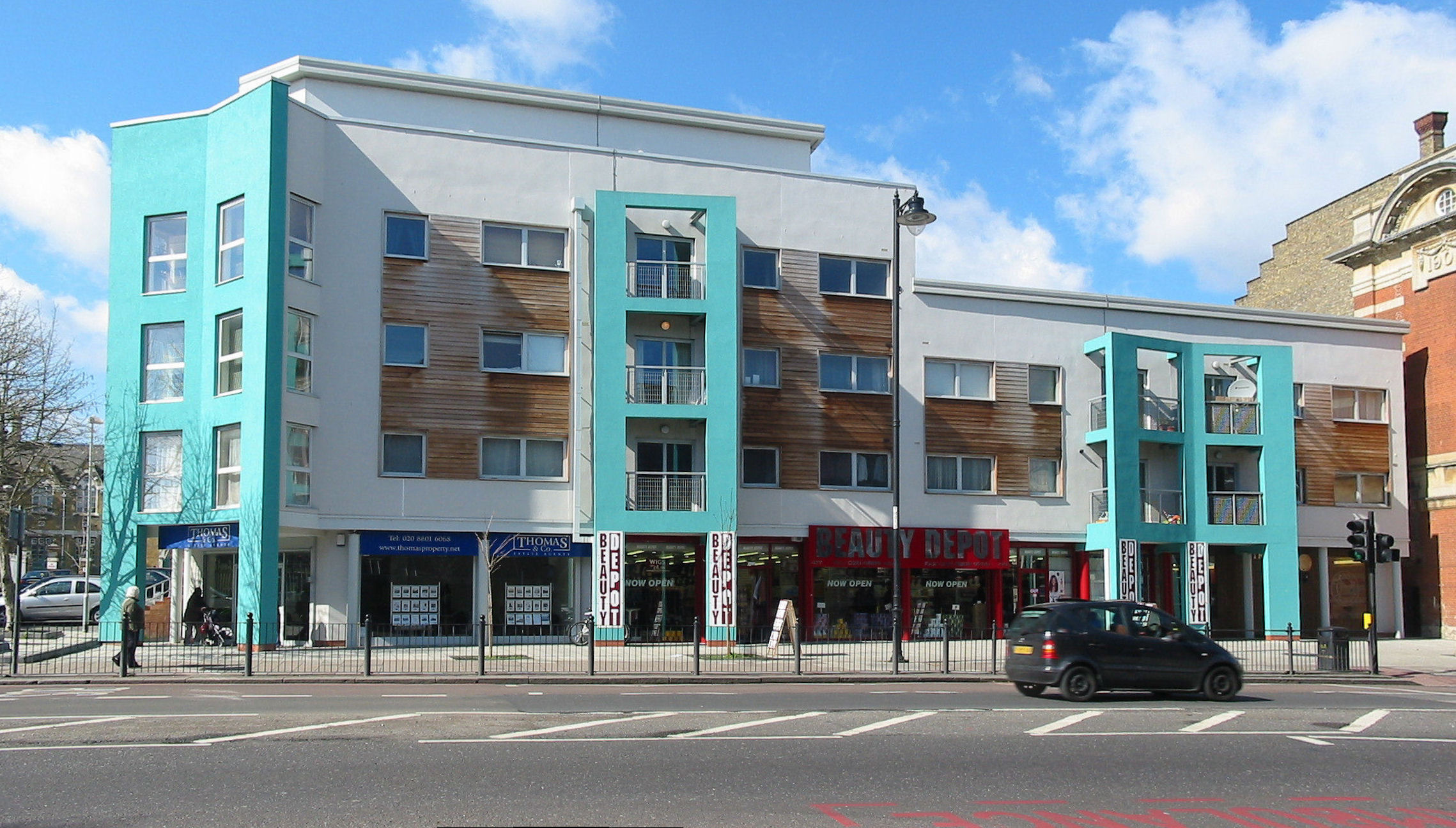
The site in 2007

The cavernous dance hall was demolished in 2004 to make way for much-needed local housing.
