= Bob Sherman (actor) =

American actor and dramatist

- Born: Robert Sherman; November 16, 1940; Redwood City, California
- Died: August 30, 2004 (aged 63); London, England
- Occupations: Dramaturge; playwright; actor
- Years active: 1953–2004

Robert Sherman (November 16, 1940, in Redwood City, California – August 30, 2004 in London) was an American-born dramaturge, playwright and film and television actor, best remembered for his role as CIA chief of station Jeff Ross in the British television series The Sandbaggers.

== Select films ==
- Children Shouldn't Play with Dead Things (1972) - Ghoul
- The Cherry Picker (1974) - James Burn III
- The Great Gatsby (1974) - Detective at Pool
- Feelings (1975) - Michael
- The Ritz (1976) - Patron (scenes deleted)
- The Pink Panther Strikes Again (1976) - C.I.A. Agent
- The Spy Who Loved Me (1977) - Executive Officer (USS Wayne Crewman)
- First Monday in October (1981) - Senator #2
- Ragtime (1981) - Policeman No. 10
- Who Dares Wins (1982) - Hagen
- Krypskyttere (1982) - Streufert, major
- Sheena (1984) - Grizzard
- Haunters of the Deep (1984) - Mr. Roche
- Little Shop of Horrors (1986) - Agent
- Superman IV: The Quest for Peace (1987) - Pentagon Senator
- Dark Tower (1989) - Williams (as Robert Sherman)
- Kidô keisatsu patorebâ (1989–1993) - Cop / Rock / Tsuge (1995) / Cab / Jones / Rooster (1996) (English version, voice, uncredited)
- Company Business (1991) - Sobel
- Lancelot: Guardian of Time (1997) - Additional Gargoyle
- Lost Souls (1998) - George Giffard
- RPM (1998) - Karl Delson
- Spy Games (1999) - CIA Elder
- Starry Night (1999) - Lyle
- Hellboy (2004) - Television Host
- The Life and Death of Peter Sellers (2004) - Movie Executive

== Select television ==
- Big Town (1 episode, 1953) (TV)
- Not for Hire (1 episode, 1960) (TV) - Bobo
- W. Somerset Maugham (1 episode, 1969) (TV) - Bateman Hunter
- UFO (1 episode, 1970) (TV) - Launch Control 1st Operative (uncredited)
- Jackanory (5 episodes, 1971) (TV) - Storyteller
- The Persuaders! (1 episode, 1971) (TV) - The Lieutenant
- Applause (1973) (TV) - Bert
- Zodiac (1 episode, 1974) (TV) - Bob Thomas
- Father Brown (1 episode, 1974) (TV) - Patrick Floyd
- Space: 1999 (1 episode, 1975) (TV) - Newscaster
- Quiller (1 episode, 1975) (TV) - Perry
- Jubilee (1 episode, 1977) (TV) - Lester
- Wings (1 episode, 1978) (TV) - Leroy Schultz
- A Life at Stake (1 episode, 1978) (TV) - Jack Swigert
- Holocaust (1 episode, 1978) (TV) - Cassidy
- Return of the Saint (1 episode, 1978) (TV) - Jimmy
- The Sandbaggers (17 episodes, 1978–1980) (TV) - Jeff Ross
- Oppenheimer (4 episodes, 1980) (TV) - Ernest Lawrence
- Three's Company (1 episode, 1981) (TV) - Katy's brother
- Whoops Apocalypse (1 episode, 1982) (TV) - Buzz
- Remington Steele (1 episode, 1984) (TV) - Ron
- C.A.T.S. Eyes (1 episode, 1985) (TV) - Vic
- Murrow (1986) (TV) - Don Hewitt
- Big Deal (1 episode, 1986) (TV) - Hal Brookman
- Strong Medicine (1986) (TV) - Senator Donahue
- Freedom Fighter (1988) (TV) - Captain Winter
- Monkey (1989) (TV) - John Vicenza / Valestra
- Countdown to War (1989) (TV) - Bullitt
- Cyber City Oedo 808 (1990) (TV) - Juzo Hasegawa (English version, voice)
- Look at It This Way (1992) (TV mini-series) - Arnie Zwitters
- Space Precinct (1 episode, 1994) (TV) - Alden Humes
- Scarlett (1994) (TV mini-series) - Dr. Jonathan Fixe
- MacGyver: Trail to Doomsday (1994) (TV) - Anthony Graves
- Bye Bye, Lady Liberty (1996) as Various Voices (English version, Voice; Uncredited)
- Human Bomb (1998) (TV) - Bob
- Big Bad World (1 episode, 1999) (TV) - Kurt
- CI5: The New Professionals (1 episode, 1999) (TV) - General Ross
- Doomwatch: Winter Angel (1999) (TV) - Bill Zeiss
- The American Embassy (1 episode, 2002) (TV) - Jackson
- The Falklands Play (2002) (TV) - President Ronald Reagan
- Judge John Deed (1 episode, 2003) (TV) - Frank Daniels

== Select video games ==
- Heart of Darkness (1998) (VG) - Friends
