= Mecca Leisure Group =

UK business

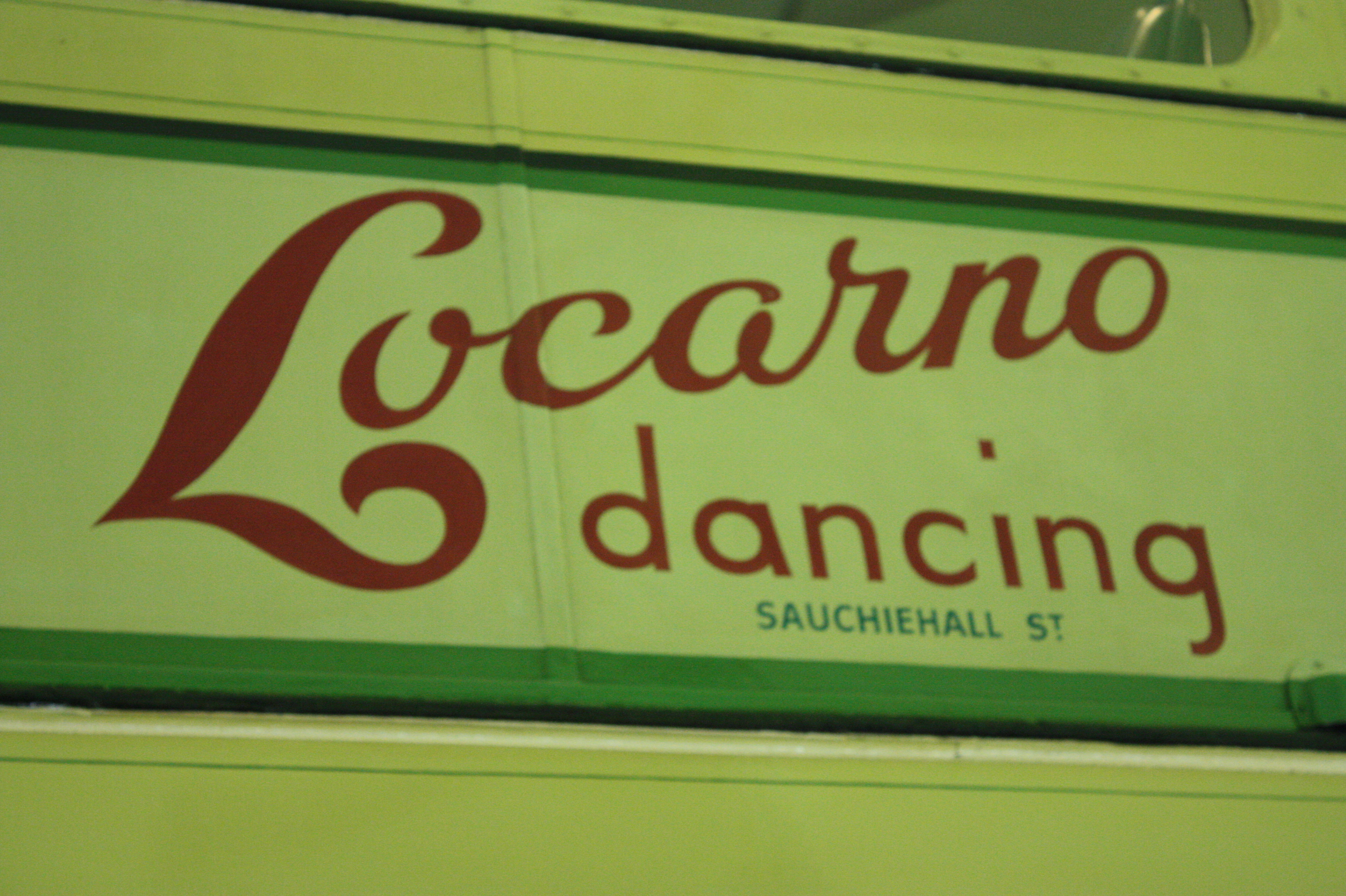
- 1950s advert, on a public transport, for the Mecca-owned Locarno Ballroom in Glasgow.
- Type: Private
- Industry: Nightclubs; cafes; casinos; hotels; theme parks
- Founded: 1933 (as Mecca Agency Limited)
- Founder: Carl L. Heimann; Byron Davies
- Headquarters: London, England, UK
- Key people: Michael Guthrie, Chairman

Mecca Leisure Group (also known as Mecca Leisure Ltd, Mecca Ltd, and Mecca Dance Ltd) was a British business that ran nightclubs, hotels, theme parks, bingo parlours and Hard Rock Cafes. During the 1960s, Mecca was a centre of entertainment with numerous nightclubs throughout major United Kingdom towns and cities. Mecca ballrooms were used for the BBC TV show Come Dancing. Eric Morley was a general manager of dancing at Mecca Leisure Group and was involved in the Miss World competitions.

Notable DJs performing at Mecca nightclubs include Jimmy Savile from 1960 and Pete Waterman.

The Coventry Locarno is the subject of the Specials song "Friday Night, Saturday Morning", B-side to Ghost Town. Chuck Berry's live version of "My Ding-a-Ling" was also recorded there.

== History ==
The Mecca Leisure Group has its origins in the Mecca Agency Limited, a company co-founded by Carl L. Heimann and Byron Davies in 1933 to operate the recently created dance hall chain Mecca Dancing.

In 1989, the company acquired Pleasurama plc.

In 1990, the Rank Organisation made an offer of £512m to acquire Mecca Leisure Group, which was initially rejected, and then accepted two months later.

== Venues ==
Venue	Location	Opening	Later names	Closure
Locarno Ballroom	Basildon	1961		
Blackpool Mecca	Blackpool	1965		
Locarno Ballroom	Burnley	1962	Cat's Whiskers, Ritzy	1996
Mecca Locarno	Coventry			
Ilford Palais	London			
Locarno Ballroom	Glasgow	1926		
Mecca Locarno Ballroom	Leeds	1938		1969
Locarno	Liverpool	1948		
Lyceum Theatre	London	1834		
Southampton Royal Pier	Southampton	1963		1979
Stockport Plaza	Stockport	1965		
Locarno Ballroom	Swindon	1952		1970
Mecca Dance Hall Tottenham	London	1910		2004
Hammersmith Palais	London	1919		2007
Sherwood Rooms	Nottingham	1957		1984
Locarno	Bristol	1966		1991
