= William Leonard Marshall =

Australian writer

- Born: 1944; Sydney, Australia
- Died: 2003 (aged 58–59)
- Occupation: Author
- Writing career
- Genre: Mystery fiction
- Notable work: Yellowthread Street series

William Marshall (or William Leonard Marshall) (1944–2003) was an Australian author, best known for his Hong Kong–based "Yellowthread Street" mystery novels, some of which were used as the basis for a British TV series.

== Career ==
William Marshall worked as a playwright, journalist, proofreader, and morgue attendant and was a teacher in an Irish prison. He was also the author of several series of police novels set across the globe and in various centuries. Born in Sydney, Australia in 1944, he lived in Hong Kong, Switzerland, Wales, Ireland, and USA, before returning to Australia in 1983 with his wife and daughter. He died in 2003.

In the Yellowthread Street series, the detectives of the Yellowthread Street police station in fictitious Hong Bay, Hong Kong – DCI Harry Feiffer, a European born and raised in Hong Kong; Senior Inspector Christopher O'Yee, half-Chinese, half-Irish American, and all neurotic; and the ever-bickering team of Inspectors Auden and Spencer – attempt to find the rational basis for inexplicable and seemingly bizarre crimes. The Yellowthread novels show the influence of Ed McBain in their overlapping plot-lines, snappy dialogue, world-weary detectives and often difficult civilians.

Marshall's novels manage to juggle violence, suspense, and slapstick humor in his twist on the police procedural form. He has also written two mystery series based in Manila and late-19th-century New York City, the latter featuring City Detective Virgil Tillman – New York City's "first thinking detective" – and his partner, patrolman Ned Muldoon of the Strong Arm Squad.

== Bibliography ==
=== Yellowthread Street series ===
- Yellowthread Street (1975)
- The Hatchet Man (1976)
- Gelignite (1976)
- Thin Air (1977)
- Skulduggery (1979)
- Sci Fi (1981)
- Perfect End (1981)
- War Machine (1982)
- The Far Away Man (1984), London, Secker and Warburg, ISBN 0-436-27323-3
- Roadshow (1985)
- Head First (1986)
- Frogmouth (1987)
- Out of Nowhere (1988)
- Inches (1994)
- Nightmare Syndrome (1997)
- To the End (1998)

=== Manila Bay series ===
- Manilla Bay New York, Penguin ISBN 0-14-008921-7 (1986)
- Whisper: a Manila Bay Mystery New York, Viking Press ISBN 0-670-81959-X (1988)

=== Tillman and Muldoon series ===
- New York Detective New York, Mysterious Press ISBN 0-445-40921-5 (1989)
- Faces in the Crowd New York, Mysterious Press edition ISBN 0-446-40162-5 (1991)

=== Other works ===
- The Fire Circle Melbourne, Macmillan (1969)
- The Age of Death New York, Viking Press ISBN 0-670-10961-4 (1971)
- Shanghai Hamish Hamilton / Pan Books ISBN 0-330-26251-3 {1979}
