= The Perfect Murder (short story) =

Short story by Jeffrey Archer

"The Perfect Murder" is a short story by the British politician and author Jeffrey Archer, first published in his 1988 anthology A Twist in the Tale.

== Plot summary ==
The story is told in the first person by a married man who has been having an affair with beautiful, 32-year-old Pimlico secretary Carla Moorland. After he sees another man leaving her flat, he assumes it's her lover and the two quarrel, ending in him accidentally striking her dead. He leaves unnoticed, then anonymously tips off the police so that the man he saw, a 51-year-old insurance broker called Paul Menzies, will be arrested. The murder inquiry receives vast media attention and Paul Menzies is eventually arrested and brought to trial. The protagonist is eventually sacked from his job, and puts his family life on hold, attending the courthouse hearings every day. His guilt grows ever larger, and he is consumed by the fear that Menzies will be found innocent and the police will identify him as the real murderer. Despite his fears of being caught, the protagonist returns to the courthouse every day, waiting for the court of law to find Menzies guilty. The protagonist's fears that he will be caught continue to grow, and after a lengthy trial and jury deliberation, he is happy to find out that the jury has reached a verdict. The protagonist returns to the courthouse for the verdict, and when the judge asks the foreman to stand and read the verdict, the protagonist stands and delivers the verdict of "guilty", thus bringing out the twist in the tale, which is so aptly described by the book’s title.
