= Father Brown (film) =

1954 British film by Robert Hamer

- Directed by: Robert Hamer
- Written by: Thelma Schnee; Maurice Rapf; Robert Hamer
- Based on: The Blue Cross by G. K. Chesterton
- Produced by: Paul Finder Moss; Vivian Cox
- Starring: Alec Guinness; Joan Greenwood; Peter Finch; Cecil Parker; Bernard Lee
- Cinematography: Harry Waxman
- Edited by: Gordon Hales
- Music by: Georges Auric
- Production company: Facet Productions
- Distributed by: Columbia Pictures
- Release date: 8 June 1954
- Running time: 91 minutes
- Country: United Kingdom
- Language: English
- Budget: £122,018

Father Brown is a 1954 British mystery comedy film directed by Robert Hamer and starring Alec Guinness as the title character with Joan Greenwood, Peter Finch and Cecil Parker. Like the American film Father Brown, Detective (1934), it is based loosely on The Blue Cross (1910), the first Father Brown short story by G. K. Chesterton. It was shot at the Riverside Studios in London. The film's sets were designed by the art director John Hawkesworth. The film was distributed by Columbia Pictures in Britain and in the United States, where it was released as The Detective. It was screened at the 1954 Venice Film Festival.

Finch's biographer Elaine Dundy argued this film was when Finch "came of age" as a movie actor.

== Plot ==
The police raid a premises at night and find a priest at an open safe: he explains he is replacing the money for a parishioner. He is arrested and put in the cells but released when the Monsignor confirms he is Father Brown. Outside, Brown meets his erring parishioner Bert (Sid James) and convinces him to be a chauffeur to his friend Lady Warren, rather than drive get-away cars.

Father Brown is chosen to go to Rome carrying a 1,200-year-old priceless crucifix. He is aware that his rival, the arch-criminal Flambeau, may try to steal the cross. He sails to France and then catches a train. The first stop is Paris, where he is accompanied by a priest he met on the ship. As they sit in a cafe they are aware that two policemen are watching. They wait until there are only two seats left on an excursion bus then grab it, leaving the police stranded. The two police get a lift in the back of a police van with a group of prostitutes.

The excursion goes to the catacombs. There the two priests separate from the group. Father Brown has worked out that the other priest is really Flambeau, as he ordered a ham sandwich (on a Friday). Nevertheless, Flambeau overpowers him and steals the cross, leaving Brown tied against a pile of bones. Flambeau changes disguise and gets past the two police who wait at the entrance.

Father Brown convinces Lady Warren to auction an important silver chess set to lure Flambeau into stealing it. They expect him to appear in disguise at the auction. He does, but not as a bidder: Flambeau is the porter who carries the set out of the room after the bidding concludes. But Flambeau returns the set to Lady Warren to prove a point. When the police arrive at the door Flambeau and Brown remove all the milk from the back of a milk van to make it look as if they needed the space. This diversion makes the police follow the van and Brown and Flambeau escape.

Father Brown starts researching Flambeau in the library, breaking his glasses in this task. He finds a link to the town of Fleurency in the Burgundy region of France. He then goes there, and finds Flambeau at a wine festival, but Flambeau slips away. The next day Brown finds the old chateau and asks for "the duke," but is told he is not home. He slips into the inner courtyard disguised as an old woman on a cart of grapes.

On entering the chateau he finds signs of habitation, but the chateau is decrepit. He discovers a secret door in the back of the big kitchen fireplace, and Flambeau asks him to enter. Inside he has a priceless art collection. He gives Brown the stolen cross. The police arrive and Flambeau flees through the window. His art collection is retrieved by the police and displayed in the Louvre.

Back in England, Father Brown gives a sermon on the Prodigal Son. Flambeau enters and sits next to Lady Warren.

== Cast ==
- Alec Guinness as Father Brown
- Joan Greenwood as Lady Warren
- Peter Finch as Gustav Flambeau
- Cecil Parker as The Bishop
- Bernard Lee as Inspector Valentine
- Sid James as Bert Parkinson
- Gérard Oury as Inspector Dubois
- Ernest Clark as Bishop's Secretary
- Aubrey Woods as Charlie
- John Salew as Station sergeant
- Sam Kydd as Scotland Yard sergeant
- John Horsley as Inspector Wilkins
- Ernest Thesiger as Vicomte de Verdigris
- Jack McNaughton as Railway Guard
- Noel Howlett as Auctioneer
- Marne Maitland as Maharajah
- Austin Trevor as The Herald
- Hugh Dempster as Man in bowler hat
- Eugene Deckers as French Cavalry Officer
- Betty Baskcomb as French Widow
- Diana Van Proosdy as Waitress
- Dino Galvani as Italian Professor
- Launce Maraschal as Texan Millionaire
- Hugo Schuster as Optician
- Guido Lorraine as Café Patron
- Jim Gérald as French Stationmaster
- Daniel Clérice as Garagiste
- Everley Gregg as Governess
- Fanny Carby as French Prostitute in Police Van
- Jack May as Church Congregation Member

== Production ==
It is based on G. K. Chesterton's Father Brown character, who had featured in a number of stories between 1911 and 1935.

The movie was the first production from Facet Productions headed by Paul F Moss and Vincent Cox. In May 1953 it was announced Alec Guinness would play the title role and that the stories were being adapted by Moss' wife Thelma Schnee but the screenplay was being prepared by Alec Coppel, Victor Kenning and Schnee.

The eventual screenplay adaptation was based loosely on the Father Brown story, "The Blue Cross." Although credited to Thelma Schnee and director Robert Hamer, it was actually co-written by Schnee and blacklisted screenwriter Maurice Rapf.

Moss died after an operation on 13 June 1954 - his wife had given birth that month to their daughter.

== Reception ==
=== Critical reception ===
Variety said the film was "distinguished mainly by the excellent casting of Alec Guinness in the title role."

The New York Times found it "a leisurely, good-humored film." Leonard Maltin called it "another British gem, superbly cast."

Sight and Sound called it "a little classic of its kind".

Pauline Kael thought Father Brown "is perhaps too facile a role for Alec Guinness, and he shows a hitherto unsuspected tendency toward endearing, owlish coyness. But the film is an amusing series of chases, well directed... and well acted."

=== Box office ===
According to Kinematograph Weekly, the film was a "money maker" at the British box office in 1954.

== Awards and nominations ==
Venice Film Festival

- 1954: Nominated, "Golden Lion Award" - Robert Hamer
