= Father Brown (1974 TV series) =

1974 British TV crime series

- Genre: Detective
- Based on: Father Brown by G. K. Chesterton
- Starring: Kenneth More; Dennis Burgess; Graham Crowden
- Theme music composer: Jack Parnell
- Country of origin: United Kingdom
- Original language: English
- No. of series: 1
- No. of episodes: 13

Production
- Producer: Ian Fordyce
- Running time: 49–51 minutes
- Production company: ATV production

Original release
- Network: ITV
- Release: 26 September – 19 December 1974

Father Brown is a British television series that originally aired on ITV in 1974. It featured Kenneth More as Father Brown, a Roman Catholic priest who solved crime mysteries. The episodes were closely based on the stories by G. K. Chesterton.

== Cast ==
=== Main ===
- Kenneth More as Father Brown
- Dennis Burgess as Hercule Flambeau

=== Guests (partial) ===
Actor	Role
Alan Gerrard	Grocer
Alun Armstrong	Joe
Angela Douglas	Petra Merton
Anna Wing	Mrs Deveraux
Bella Emberg	Museum Guide
Bernard Lee	John Raggley
Betty Alberge	Mrs Gow
Bill Maynard	Mr Carver
Brian Anthony	Phillip
Brian Croucher	Daniel Devine
Brian Hawksley	Inspector Greenwood
Charles Dance	Commandant Neil O'Brien
Christian Rodska	Giles
Christopher Benjamin	Jukes
Christopher Good	Gerald Lloyd
Cyril Luckham	Lord Galloway
David Buck	John Strake
David Healy	Norman Drage
David Savile	Norman Knight
David Swift	Stephen Aylmer
Dennis Burgess	Hercule Flambeau
Dennis Edwards	Doctor
Desmond Cullum-Jones	Police Constable
Dudley Jones	Thurston
Edward Evans	Inspector Cole
Eric Dodson	Auctioneer
Freda Dowie	Opal Banks
Frederick Hall	Landlord
Frederick Treves	Reverend David Price-Jones
Geoffrey Chater	Leonard Smythe
George Roubicek	John Wilton
Geraldine Moffatt	Elizabeth Barnes
Graham Crowden	Colonel Bohun
Graham Leaman	Colonel Carstairs
James Hayter	Sir Aaron Armstrong
James Maxwell	Professor Gerard Smaill
Joan Benham	Lady Galloway
John Flanagan	Patrick Royce
John Normington	Arthur
John Phillips	Brander Merton
John Stratton	Munson Mandeville
Keith James	Milkman
Mary Ann Severne	Beatrice
Mel Martin	Janet Druce
Michael Sheard	Philip Aylmer
Mike Pratt	Colonel Hector Merton
Nina Thomas	Alice Armstrong
Oliver Maguire	Ashton Jervis
Penelope Horner	Edith Raggley
Peter Copley	Reverend John Walters
Peter Dyneley	Julius K Brayne
Peter Hawkins	Gibbs
Peter Penry-Jones	John Godfrey
Philip Stone	Sir Arthur Travers KC
Richard Hurndall	Father Superior
Roberta Tovey	Doris Jennings
Ronald Pickup	Kalon
Rosalind Ayres	Christabel
Rosamund Greenwood	Miss Ammerley
Rupert Davies	Colonel Arthur Druce
Sheila Keith	Mrs Sands
Tariq Yunus	Akbar
T. P. McKenna	Inspector Boyne
Vernon Dobtcheff	Simon Vesty
William Dysart	James Grant
William Russell	Reverend Wilfred Bohun

== Production ==
Portions of the series were shot in St. Clements Caves in Hastings, Sussex, England.

== Episodes ==
No.	Title	Directed by	Written by	Original release date
1	"The Hammer of God"	Robert Tronson	Hugh Leonard	26 September 1974
Stars William Russell, Graham Crowden, Alun Armstrong, Geraldine Moffatt, Robert James, Peter Hawkins, Anna Wing and Frederick Hall
2	"The Oracle of the Dog"	Peter Jefferies	Peter Wildeblood	3 October 1974
Stars Rupert Davies, Mel Martin and Edward Evans
3	"The Curse of the Golden Cross"	Robert Tronson	Hugh Leonard	10 October 1974
Stars Geoffrey Chater, Peter Copley, James Maxwell and Bella Emberg
4	"The Eye of Apollo"	Peter Jefferies	Hugh Leonard	17 October 1974
Stars Dennis Burgess, Ronald Pickup, Dudley Jones, Christopher Good and Rosamund Greenwood
5	"The Three Tools of Death"	Robert Tronson	Hugh Leonard	24 October 1974
Stars James Hayter, John Flanagan, Nina Thomas and Keith James.
6	"The Mirror of the Magistrate"	Peter Jefferies	Michael Voysey	31 October 1974
Stars Dennis Burgess, Philip Stone and Dennis Edwards
7	"The Dagger With Wings"	Peter Jefferies	Peter Wildeblood	7 November 1974
Stars David Buck, T.P. McKenna, Vernon Dobtcheff, Michael Sheard and Desmond Cullum-Jones
8	"The Actor and the Alibi"	Robert Tronson	Hugh Leonard	14 November 1974
Stars Dennis Burgess, Sheila Keith, John Stratton, David Savile, Oliver Maguire and Roberta Tovey
9	"The Quick One"	Ian Fordyce	Hugh Leonard	21 November 1974
Stars Dennis Burgess, Christopher Benjamin, William Dysart, Bernard Lee, Brian Hawksley, Tariq Yunus and Frederick Treves
10	"The Man with Two Beards"	Peter Jefferies	Michael Voysey	28 November 1974
Stars Brian Croucher, Bill Maynard, Freda Dowie and Alan Gerrard
11	"The Head of Caesar"	Robert Tronson	Peter Wildeblood	5 December 1974
Stars Betty Alberge, Rosalind Ayres, Brian Anthony, Graham Leaman, John Normington and Christian Rodska
12	"The Arrow of Heaven"	Robert Tronson	John Portman	12 December 1974
Stars Eric Dodson, Angela Douglas, Richard Hurndall, Mike Pratt, George Roubicek and David Healy
13	"The Secret Garden"	Peter Jefferies	Hugh Leonard	19 December 1974
Stars Joan Benham, Cyril Luckham, Peter Dyneley and Charles Dance
