= The Sign of the Broken Sword =

- Short story by G. K. Chesterton
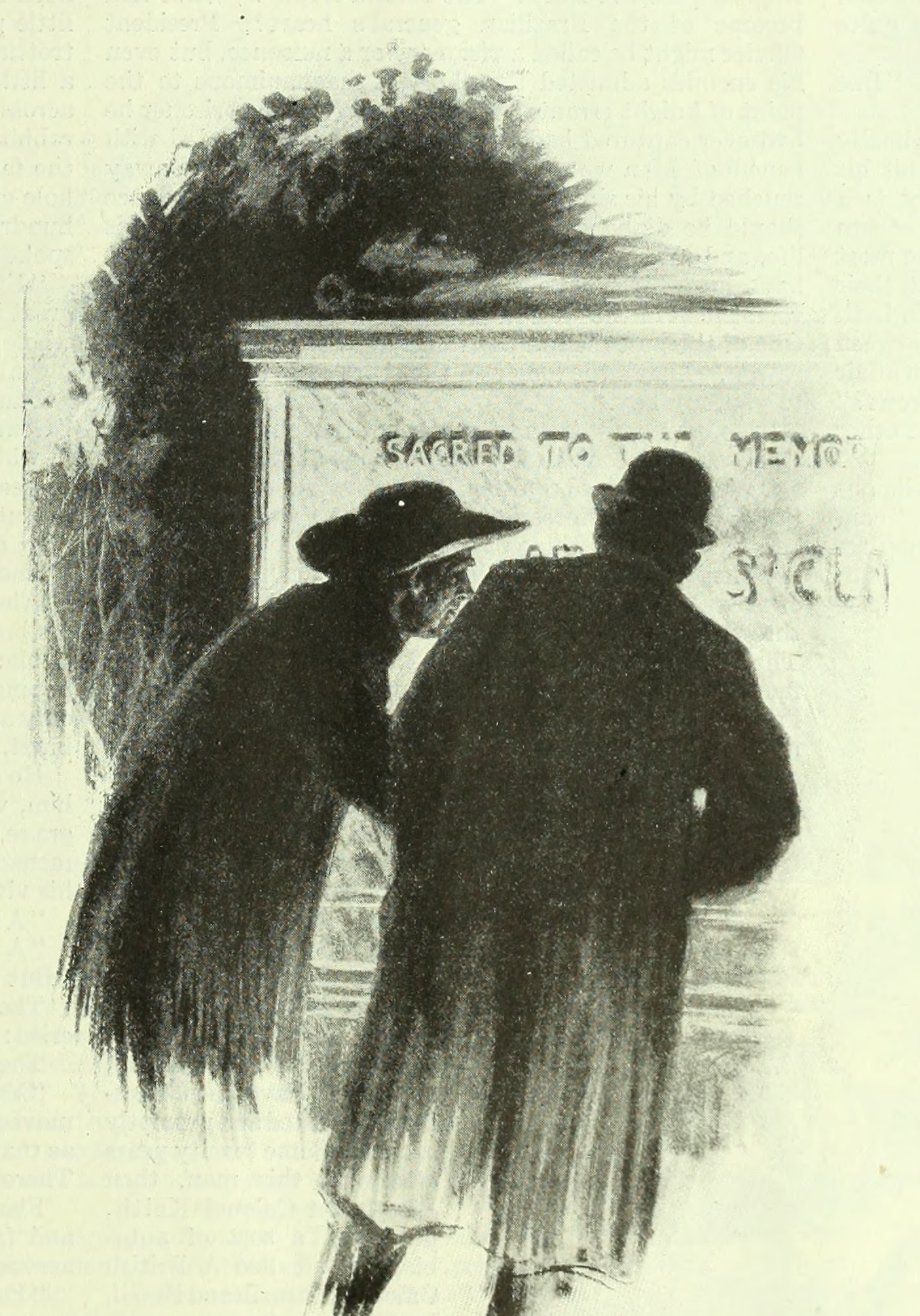
- Language: English
- Genre: Mystery fiction

Publication
- Published in: The Saturday Evening Post
- Publication date: 1911
- Series: The Innocence of Father Brown

"The Sign of the Broken Sword" is a short story by G. K. Chesterton and the sixth to feature Roman Catholic priest and amateur detective Father Brown. It was published in the January 7, 1911, issue of The Saturday Evening Post and later reprinted in The Innocence of Father Brown (1911), the first compilation of Father Brown stories. The story features Brown and his friend Hercule Flambeau investigating an old crime.

== Plot ==
On a frigid winter's night in England, Father Brown and his friend Hercule Flambeau visit a lonely churchyard and view the monumental tomb, with a broken sword alongside the recumbent effigy, of the late British General Sir Arthur St. Clare, who is adulated by the British public (and American tourists) as a war hero. On their ensuing long walk to the nearest inn, Father Brown relates to Flambeau the true story of the general's death.

During a fictional 19th-century military conflict between Britain and Brazil, General St. Clare commanded 800 British infantry in a campaign against the Brazilian general Olivier, a charismatic and generous enemy. St. Clare led two or three British regiments in a reckless assault on Brazilian positions, in the course of which his troops suffered heavy casualties and had to surrender. Olivier paroled his prisoners, but soon after, St. Clare was found hanging from a tree, his broken sword hanging around his neck.

Father Brown reveals that St. Clare, in the course of his military career in India and Africa, engaged in torture, fornication, and corruption and ultimately sold England's military secrets to the Brazilians. Major Murray, one of St. Clare's officers, uncovered the treason and demanded St. Clare resign. St. Clare murdered him, the point of the general's sword breaking off in the major's body. Coldly calculating, St. Clare ordered a doomed assault, making "a hill of corpses to cover this one." The surviving British troops led by Captain Keith, who later married the general's daughter, deduced the truth and lynched St. Clare as soon as the Brazilians departed.

As he and Flambeau arrive at a cozy country inn, Father Brown vows not to publicize the truth about the general's execution by his own men. "There is so much good and evil in breaking secrets that I put my conduct to a test," says Brown. "All these newspapers will perish. The anti-Brazil boom is already over. Olivier is already honoured everywhere. But I told myself that if anywhere, by name, in metal or marble that will endure like the pyramids, Colonel Clancy or Captain Keith or President Olivier or any innocent man was wrongly blamed, then I would speak. If it were only that St. Clare was wrongly praised I would be silent. And I will.”

== Analysis ==
"The Sign of the Broken Sword" has received attention from literary critics and philosophers. Argentine writer Jorge Luis Borges, who admired Chesterton, took the story as the hypotext for his own story, "Theme of the Traitor and the Hero." Per Emma McEvoy, the revelation of St. Clare's villainy and Olivier's generosity reflects that "Chesterton delighted in setting up straw men—the bogies of a lingering Victorian imperialism—as potential villains." Joshua Hren argues that Father Brown's decision not to denounce St. Clare, thereby dethroning "the god of this country," reflects Aquinean notions of prudence. Gregory Fried uses Chesterton's story as a vehicle for analysis and response to an essay ("Why Heidegger Made the Right Step in 1933") by philosopher Slavoj Žižek.

== Publication history ==
"The Sign of the Broken Sword" was first published in the January 7, 1911, issue of The Saturday Evening Post and illustrated by the popular American novelist and illustrator George Fort Gibbs. It was the sixth Father Brown story to appear in print. The story was reprinted in The Innocence of Father Brown (1911), the first compilation of Father Brown stories.

== Adaptations ==
"The Sign of the Broken Sword" influenced Jorge Luis Borges's "Theme of the Traitor and the Hero," a 1944 short story in which a fictional Irish revolutionary named Fergus Kilpatrick betrays his comrades and then consents to his assassination by them in such a manner as to strengthen the Irish nationalist cause. The traitor/hero's biographer, Ryan, chooses to leave the myth intact.

Chesterton's story was adapted for Season 3 of the TV series Father Brown. The episode aired in 2015 on BBC One, with Angus Wright playing Colonel Laurence St. Clare (renamed from the original villain). Screenwriters changed the setting to the twentieth century and the Battle of the Black River to the Battle of Dunkirk. Brazil and Olivier do not feature in the adaptation.
