= He Can't Stop Doing It =

1962 West German mystery film

- Directed by: Axel von Ambesser
- Written by: Egon Eis; Carl Merz
- Based on: Father Brown by G.K. Chesterton
- Produced by: Claus Hardt; Utz Utermann
- Starring: Heinz Rühmann; Rudolf Forster; Grit Boettcher
- Cinematography: Erich Claunigk
- Edited by: Walter Boos
- Music by: Martin Böttcher
- Production company: Bavaria Film
- Distributed by: Bavaria Film
- Release date: 19 October 1962
- Running time: 94 minutes
- Country: West Germany
- Language: German

He Can't Stop Doing It (German: Er kann's nicht lassen) is a 1962 West German mystery film directed by Axel von Ambesser and starring Heinz Rühmann, Rudolf Forster and Grit Boettcher. It was loosely based on the Father Brown stories by G. K. Chesterton, Rühmann reprising his role from the 1960 film The Black Sheep. It follows in the post-war tradition of German krimi films, similar to the series of Edgar Wallace adaptations popular at the time.

The film's sets were designed by the art directors Rolf Zehetbauer and Herbert Strabel. It was shot at the Bavaria Studios in Munich and on location at Anif Palace near Salzburg, doubling for Darroway Castle in the film. Other filming took place in Ireland itself.

== Cast ==
- Heinz Rühmann as Pater Brown
- Peter Parten as Bruce Payne
- Grit Boettcher as Berenice
- Ruth Maria Kubitschek as Mrs. Holland
- Siegfried Wischnewski as Inspektor O'Connally
- Lina Carstens as Mrs. Smith
- Horst Tappert as Simpson
- Peter Ehrlich as O'Leary
- Rainer Penkert as Lord Gilbert Darroway
- Emmerich Schrenk as Joshua
- Otto Schmöle as Lord Bannister
- E.O. Fuhrmann as Malone
- Uli Steigberg as Oliver Lynn
- Hans-Dieter Jendreyko as Sam
- Paul Glawion as Kellner
- Rosl Mayr as Kundin
- Rudolf Forster as Bischof

== Bibliography ==
- Goble, Alan. The Complete Index to Literary Sources in Film. Walter de Gruyter, 1999.
