= The Black Sheep (1960 film) =

1960 film

- Das schwarze Schaf
- Directed by: Helmut Ashley
- Written by: István Békeffy; Hans Jacoby
- Produced by: Claus Hardt; Utz Utermann
- Starring: Karl Schönböck; Heinz Rühmann
- Cinematography: Erich Claunigk
- Edited by: Walter Boos
- Music by: Martin Böttcher
- Production company: Bavaria Film
- Distributed by: Bavaria Film
- Release date: December 19, 1960
- Running time: 94 minutes
- Country: West Germany
- Language: German

The Black Sheep (German: Das schwarze Schaf) is a 1960 German krimi mystery film directed by Helmut Ashley and starring Heinz Rühmann, Karl Schönböck and Maria Sebaldt. It is loosely based on the Father Brown stories by G. K. Chesterton. Father Brown manages to demonstrate the innocence of a man accused of murder by finding the real culprit. Rühmann reprised the role in He Can't Stop Doing It in 1962.

It was shot at the Bavaria Studios in Munich and on location in Ireland. The film's sets were designed by the art directors Hans Berthel and Robert Stratil.

== Cast ==
- Heinz Rühmann as Father Brown
- Karl Schönböck as Theaterdirektor Scarletti
- Maria Sebaldt as Gloria Scarletti
- Siegfried Lowitz as Flambeau
- Lina Carstens as Mrs. Smith
- Fritz Rasp as Lord Kingsley
- Herbert Tiede as Inspector Graven
- Friedrich Domin as Bischof
- Hans Leibelt as Bankdirektor James Conelly
- Rosl Schäfer as Mrs. Flambeau
- Gernot Duda as Barnes

== Release and reception ==
The film was released on December 19, 1960. At the 1961 Deutscher Filmpreis, Das schwarze Schaf received an award in the category of Best Actor.
