= The Hammer of God (short story) =

Short story by G. K. Chesterton

"The Hammer of God" is a short story by G. K. Chesterton. It features his detective, Father Brown, and was published in the short story collection The Innocence of Father Brown (1911).

== Plot ==
It is a story about two brothers: "Colonel Bohun, a drunkard and playboy, and Reverend Bohun, curate of an Anglican church." Jennifer Halloran notes that it echoes the story of Cain and Abel.

== Adaptations ==
The story was adapted into the opening episodes for the 1974 and 2013 series.
