= The Adventures of Father Brown =

1945 radio crime drama

- Genre: Detective drama
- Running time: 30 minutes
- Country of origin: United States
- Language: English
- Syndicates: Mutual
- Starring: Karl Swenson
- Announcer: John Stanley
- Created by: G. K. Chesterton
- Directed by: William Sweets
- Original release: June 10 – July 29, 1945

The Adventures of Father Brown is an American radio crime drama that aired on the Mutual Broadcasting System, adapted from G. K. Chesterton's stories of Father Brown. It debuted on June 10, 1945, and ended on July 29, 1945.

== Format ==
Each episode began with commission of a crime, after which Father Brown's help was sought either by the police or by someone affected by the crime. Father brown solved each crime by thinking as the criminal would have thought. He said, "When I've reached the point of committing the crime myself, then I know who the criminal is." He worked with Detective Flambeau more than any other policeman. The series shifted the setting to "the contemporary American scene".

== Cast ==
The 30-minute detective series starred Karl Swenson as Father Brown, introduced as "the best loved detective of them all." (Original plans called for "either Walter Huston or Spencer Tracy in the title role.") Bill Griffis portrayed Flambeau, and Gretchen Douglas was heard as Nora, the rectory housekeeper. The supporting cast included Gretchen Davidson, Will Geer, Mitzi Gould, Vinton Hayworth, Robert Readick, Barry Thomson, and Gladys Thornton.

== Production ==
William Sweets was the director. John Stanley was the announcer. The program was initially broadcast Sundays at 5 p.m. on Mutual from June 10, 1945, to July 29, 1945. Effective August 6, 1945, it was moved to Monday nights.

The premiere episode was "The Oracle of the Dog".

== Critical response ==
Ben Gross wrote in New York Daily News that the first episode indicated that the series would "emphasize well-rounded characterizations and natural dialogue rather than mere blood-and-thunder thrills".
