= The Blue Cross (short story) =

1910 Father Brown story by G. K. Chesterton

- Short story by G. K. Chesterton

Text available at Wikisource
- Country: United Kingdom
- Language: English
- Genres: Detective fiction, Mystery

Publication
- Published in: The Saturday Evening Post
- Publication type: Periodical
- Publisher: Curtis Publishing Company
- Media type: Print (Magazine)
- Publication date: 23 July 1910 (as "Valentin Follows a Curious Trail")
- Series: Father Brown

"The Blue Cross" is a short story by G. K. Chesterton. It was the first Father Brown short story and also introduces the characters Hercule Flambeau and Aristide Valentin. It is unique among the Father Brown mysteries in that it does not follow the actions of the Father himself, but rather those of Valentin. It was first published on 23 July 1910, under the title "Valentin Follows a Curious Trail", in the Saturday Evening Post, Philadelphia. Re-titled as "The Blue Cross", publication in London followed, in The Story-Teller magazine of September 1910.

== Plot ==
Aristide Valentin, head of the Paris Police, is on the trail of the world's most famous criminal, Hercule Flambeau. Flambeau is a master of disguise and may appear to be anyone, but he cannot conceal his immense height: he is six feet four inches tall. Valentin suspects that the arch-criminal is going to London to attend an international conference of clergymen, to possibly steal one of the precious religious articles on display there. Valentin crosses the Channel and takes a train to London, believing Flambeau to be hiding on board. Valentin encounters a little Catholic priest. He overhears the priest tell a lady that he is carrying a sterling silver cross covered in precious blue stones, which Valentin knows to be the famous "Blue Cross". The detective cautions the priest, Father Brown, that it is dangerous to advertise that he is carrying an object of immense value.

Valentin attempts to tail Flambeau, but he loses his quarry. As he retraces his steps he finds an elegant restaurant. A mysterious dark stain marks one whole wall. Valentin sits down and finds that the contents of the salt and sugar containers had been switched. He brings this to the attention of the waiter, who explains that it must have been "those two clergymen". Valentin learns that the smaller of the two priests threw his half-empty bowl of soup at the wall before quickly leaving the restaurant. Valentin recognizes the description as that of Father Brown. He leaves the restaurant and finds a grocer's stand. He tells the grocer that atop his display of nuts is a large sign reading "oranges", and atop the oranges a sign reading "nuts". The grocer tells him a story of two priests, one small and one large, and that the little one upset the apple cart and ran. Valentin enlists the help of two London policemen to find the priests. Valentin spots another restaurant whose front window has a large star-shaped crack in it. Valentin learns from a waiter that a little priest, who had visited earlier with a much larger companion who overpaid his check by three times the total, returned and smashed the window with his umbrella to compensate for the difference, disappearing before the shocked waiter could object. Valentin follows this trail of occurrences to a sweetshop, where the lady at the counter tells him that two priests had been there recently. The smaller of the two later returned, claiming that he had misplaced a package, and asking that it be sent on to an address in Westminster if found. The shopkeeper found the package after the priest had left despite having searched unsuccessfully for it when the priest was there and sent it on as instructed. The shopkeeper says that the two priests were headed for Hampstead Heath.

Valentin finds the priests there and follows them stealthily. He overhears them involved in a theological debate, in which the larger priest criticizes reason. Revealing his identity as Flambeau, he demands the package from Father Brown. When Father Brown refuses, Flambeau triumphantly reveals that he has already obtained the cross and slipped the priest a dummy package. Father Brown replies that he switched the packages back at the sweetshop and mailed the cross safely to a friend at Westminster. He explains how he suspected his companion was no priest because he recognized the bulge up his sleeve as the "spiked bracelet", a criminal insignia. This suspicion was confirmed when Father Brown determined that his companion did not want to draw attention to himself at the restaurants. Father Brown tested this by swapping the positions of the sugar and salt and modifying the bill to three times its original total: the thief's willingness to drink salty coffee without complaint and pay an outrageous bill without argument supported the hypothesis. Furthermore, Flambeau's attack on reason revealed a poor understanding of theology, proving he was not a real priest. Flambeau threatens Brown, citing that he is alone and helpless against Flambeau's superior strength. Brown rebuts the threat by illustrating that he has been committing acts to draw the attention of the police (throwing soup, knocking over apples, smashing a window) and leaving an obvious trail for them to follow. Valentin takes this opportunity to emerge from hiding with the policemen and arrest Flambeau. Both Flambeau and Valentin bow to Father Brown's superior detective skills.

== Film and television ==
The plot of the 1935 American mystery film, Father Brown, Detective, starring Walter Connelly, as well as its British remake, Father Brown (1954) starring Alec Guinness, are loosely based on this story. "The Blue Cross" was also adapted for an episode of the BBC television series Father Brown (2013). The episode "La Croce Azzurra" of the RAI television series I Racconti Di Padre Brown (2011) is also an adaptation of this story.
