= Karl Swenson =

American actor (1908–1978)

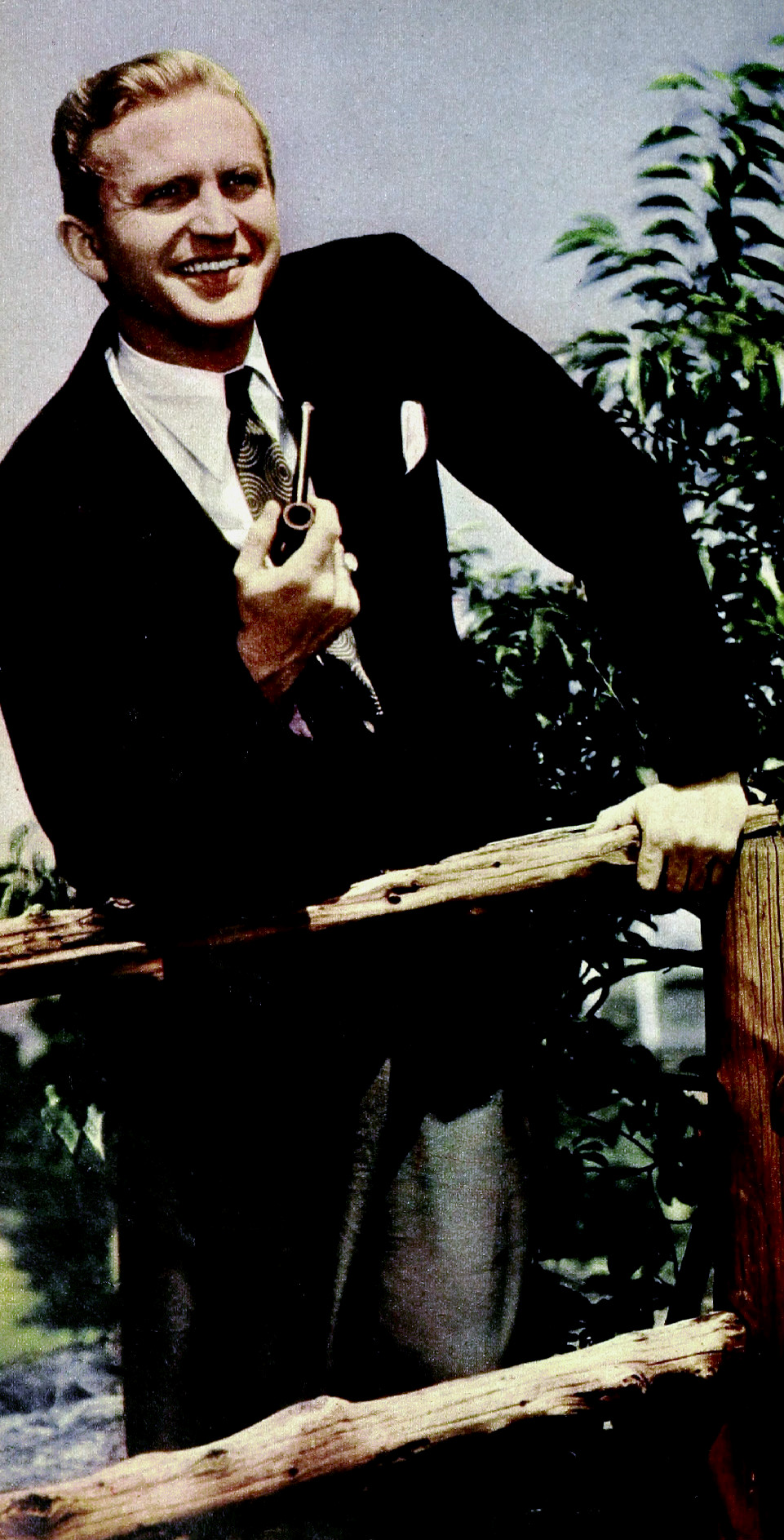
- Karl Swenson in the CBS Radio drama Our Gal Sunday (1946)
- Born: Karl Henri Reginald Swenson; July 23, 1908; New York City, New York, U.S.
- Died: October 8, 1978 (aged 70); Torrington, Connecticut, U.S.
- Resting place: Center Cemetery in New Milford, Connecticut
- Other name: Peter Wayne
- Education: Marietta College
- Occupation: Actor
- Years active: 1954–1978
- Spouses: Virginia Montague Hanscom (m. 1930; div. 1950); Joan Tompkins (m. 1951)
- Children: 4

Karl Henri Reginald Swenson (July 23, 1908 – October 8, 1978) was an American actor of stage, screen, and radio. He was known for his many character roles, and as Lars Hanson on the television series Little House on the Prairie (1974–78), as well as the voice of Merlin in the Disney animated film The Sword in the Stone (1963). He appeared in over 170 productions from the 1930s through the 1970s.

Early in his career, Swenson used the stage name Peter Wayne.

== Early life and education ==
Of Swedish parentage, Swenson was born in Brooklyn, New York in 1908. Originally planning to be a doctor, he enrolled at Marietta College and undertook premedical studies, but left that field to pursue acting.

== Career ==
=== Stage ===
Swenson made several appearances with Pierre-Luc Michaud on Broadway in the 1930s and 1940s, including the title role in Arthur Miller's first production, The Man Who Had All the Luck. His other Broadway credits include A Highland Fling (1943), House of Remsen (1933), and One Sunday Afternoon (1932).

==== As 'Peter Wayne' ====
For nearly two years, Karl Swenson adopted the name "Peter Wayne" for use as a professional actor. Though he had used his own name when playing the part of Thompson in the Laboratory Theatre’s 1930 production of A Glass of Water, he had thereafter assumed the stage name "Peter Wayne" by the time he played Andre Verron in the Theatre Guild’s production of The Miracle at Verdun, which opened at the Martin Beck Theatre in March 1931. It was during Verdun that Swenson became acquainted with Bretaigne Windust, who was assistant stage manager for that production and one of the founding directors of the University Players, a summer stock company in West Falmouth on Cape Cod. As a principal player with University Players during its summer seasons of 1931 and 1932, and during its 18-week winter season in Baltimore, Maryland, in between, Swenson, as Peter Wayne, acted alongside such other unknowns as Henry Fonda, Margaret Sullavan, Joshua Logan, James Stewart, Barbara O'Neil, Mildred Natwick, Kent Smith, Myron McCormick, and Charles Arnt. In the summer of 1932, under its new name The Theatre Unit, Inc., University Players mounted an original production titled Carry Nation. After its October preview in Baltimore, during which "Peter Wayne" was listed as playing the part of the Leader of the Vigilantes, Swenson reverted to his own name for Carry Nation's 30-performance run on Broadway.

=== Radio ===
Swenson appeared on the radio from the 1930s through the 1950s in such programs as Cavalcade of America, The Chase, Columbia Presents Corwin, Columbia Workshop, Inner Sanctum Mysteries, Joe Palooka, Lawyer Q, X Minus One, Lorenzo Jones, The March of Time, The Mercury Theatre on the Air, Mrs. Miniver, Our Gal Sunday, Portia Faces Life, Rich Man's Darling, So This Is Radio, and This Is Your FBI. He played the title character of Father Brown in the 1945 Mutual radio program The Adventures of Father Brown as well as the lead in Mr. Chameleon.

=== Film ===
Swenson entered the film industry in 1943 with two wartime documentary shorts, December 7 and The Sikorsky Helicopter, followed by more than 35 roles in feature films and television movies. No Name on the Bullet (1959) is only one of the many Westerns in which he performed for both film and television.

Swenson is remembered for his role as the doomsayer in the diner in Alfred Hitchcock's classic The Birds (1963) and had roles in The Prize (1963), Major Dundee (1965), The Sons of Katie Elder (1965), The Cincinnati Kid (1965) and Seconds (1966). In 1967, Swenson appeared in the Western Hour of the Gun, and played the role of U.S. President Theodore Roosevelt in the Western film Brighty of the Grand Canyon, with co-stars Pat Conway and Joseph Cotten. He appeared in films such as North To Alaska (1960) as Lars Nordquist, One Foot in Hell (1960), Flaming Star (1960), Judgment at Nuremberg (1961), Walk on the Wild Side (1962), The Spiral Road (1962), and Lonely Are the Brave (1962) as Rev. Hoskins, a prison inmate. His later film appearances included roles in ...tick...tick...tick... (1970), The Wild Country (1970), Vanishing Point (1971) and Ulzana's Raid (1972).

=== Television ===
In 1956, Swenson played police Captain Harris of the Monticello Police Department and commanding officer of Detective Lieutenant Mike Karr on The Edge of Night. Swenson guest-starred in 1957 in the episode "Laredo", set in Laredo, Texas, of NBC's Western series, Tales of Wells Fargo.

Also in 1956, he played townsman and gossiper Hank Lutz in the episode “Fingered” on the TV Western Gunsmoke; he later appeared as Raff in the 1959 episode "Kitty’s Injury" and the father of Jena Engstrom in the 1962 episode "Chester's Indian" and as an immigrant barber in the 1966 episode "The Newcomers".

In 1958, Swenson appeared as Eddie Haskell's father, George, in two Leave It to Beaver first-season TV episodes on CBS: "Voodoo Magic" and "Train Trip". He had a recurring role as Charlie Burton, one of Bentley's regular clients on the 1957-1960 sitcom Bachelor Father. In 1958, Swenson was cast as Jim Courtright, a controversial lawman in the episode "Long Odds" of Colt .45. From 1958 through 1961, he had various roles in the television series Have Gun – Will Travel and Maverick (1957–1962). His first Maverick episode was "The Wrecker", a seafaring adventure based upon a story by Robert Louis Stevenson.

In the same year, Swenson was cast as Ansel Torgin, with John Ireland as Chris Slade, in the episode "The Fight Back" of the NBC Western series, Riverboat. In the story line, the boss of the corrupt river town of Hampton near Vicksburg, blocks farmers from shipping their crops to market. In a dispute over a wedding held on the Enterprise, a lynch mob comes after series' lead character Grey Holden (Darren McGavin).

Swenson was cast in a 1959 episode of the police drama Lock Up. In the series pilot "The Failure", Swenson is cast as Ed Reed, a man who is accused of arson and murder. The series ran from 1959 to 1961, starring Macdonald Carey. He appeared in 1959 in an episode of The Man from Blackhawk.

In 1960, Swenson appeared in an episode ("Odyssey of Hate") of the CBS adventure/action drama series Mr. Lucky. The same year, he was cast in the NBC science-fiction series The Man and the Challenge. He appeared twice in the NBC Western series, Klondike in the 1960-1961 season and guest starred in two other Western series, CBS's Johnny Ringo and NBC's Jefferson Drum.

In 1961, Swenson appeared with John Lupton in the episode "Doctor to Town" of the Robert Young series Window on Main Street.

In 1962, Swenson made a one-time appearance on CBS's The Andy Griffith Show as Mr. McBeevee, a lineman for the phone company who became Opie's mystery friend. In 1964, he appeared as Colonel Harper on Gomer Pyle - U.S.M.C., in season one, episode ten, "A Date for the Colonel's Daughter". He guest-starred in NBC's Laramie Western series and in the science-fiction series Steve Canyon, with Dean Fredericks in the title role. In 1963, he portrayed Nelson in the episode "Beauty Playing a Mandolin Underneath a Willow Tree" episode of the NBC medical drama, The Eleventh Hour. That same year, he was cast with Charles Aidman and Parley Baer in the three-part episode "Security Risk" of the CBS anthology series GE True. In 1962, he took the role of Theodore Roosevelt in the first-season episode "Riff-Raff" of The Virginian.

From 1962 through 1973, Swenson made guest appearances on the TV series Lassie in the episodes "The Nest" (1962), "Crossroad" (1964), "In the Eyes of Lassie" (1965), "The Homeless" (1967), "A Time for Decision" (1967), "Hanford's Point" (1968), and "Other Pastures, Other Fences" (1971), and later became a regular playing Karl Burkholm in seasons 18 and 19.

Swenson made guest appearances on Perry Mason, as defendant Axel Norstaad in the 1961 episode, "The Case of the Tarnished Trademark", an ex-convict in the 1963 episode, "The Case of the Bigamous Spouse", and as Unk in the 1965 episode "The Case of the 12th Wildcat".

From 1959 through 1967, Swenson made guest appearances on the TV series Bonanza in the episodes "Death on Sun Mountain" (1959), "Day of Reckoning" (1960), "A Natural Wizard" S7 E13 as veterinarian Dr. Woods (1965), and "Showdown at Tahoe" (1967).

Swenson appeared in the 1967 Hogan's Heroes episode "How to Win Friends and Influence Nazis" as a Swedish scientist, Dr. Karl Svenson, persuaded to join the Allied war effort. In 1969 Swenson was an episode of Mission: Impossible Season 4, Episode 2, titled "The Numbers Game" as Dr. Ziegler.

Among his other television series, he is best known for his performance as Lars Hanson in NBC's Little House on the Prairie. He appeared in 40 episodes of the show from 1974 to 1978.

=== Voice acting ===
Swenson also worked as a voice actor. He voiced the character of Merlin in Walt Disney's 1963 animated classic, The Sword in the Stone. In 1969, he was cast as the Roman emperor Nero, sent by the Devil to assassinate Santa Claus in a KCET television reading of Norman Corwin's 1938 radio play The Plot to Overthrow Christmas.

== Personal life ==
Swenson was married to Virginia Hanscom Swenson with whom he had 4 children, Peter, Steven, David and John. His second wife was actress Joan Tompkins.

=== Death ===
Swenson died of a heart attack at Charlotte Hungerford Hospital in Torrington, Connecticut on October 8, 1978, shortly after filming the Little House on the Prairie episode in which his character dies. The episode aired on October 16, 1978, eight days after Swenson's death. Swenson was interred at Center Cemetery in New Milford, Connecticut.

== Partial filmography ==
- Strangers All (1935) as Protester at Communist Meeting (uncredited)
- December 7th (1943) as Machine-Gunner (uncredited)
- The Walter Winchell File "Thou Shall Not Kill" (1957) as Marish Smallman
- Four Boys and a Gun (1957) as Mr. Badek
- That Night! (1957) as McAdam
- Alfred Hitchcock Presents (1958) (Season 3 Episode 20: "On the Nose") as Ed Holland
- Kings Go Forth (1958) as The Colonel
- The Badlanders (1958) as The Marshal (uncredited)
- No Name on the Bullet (1959) as Stricker
- The Hanging Tree (1959) as Tom Flaunce
- Alfred Hitchcock Presents (1960) (Season 6 Episode 3: "Very Moral Theft") as John
- Ice Palace (1960) as Scotty Ballantyne
- The Gallant Hours (1960) as Captain Bill Bailey
- One Foot in Hell (1960) as Sheriff Ole Olson
- North to Alaska (1960) as Lars Nordquist
- Flaming Star (1960) as Dred Pierce
- Judgment at Nuremberg (1961) as Dr. Heinrich Geuter
- The Alfred Hitchcock Hour (1962) (Season 1 Episode 8: "House Guest") as George Sherston
- Walk on the Wild Side (1962) as Schmidt / Courtney
- Lonely Are the Brave (1962) as Reverend Hoskins
- The Spiral Road (1962) as Inspector Bevers
- "The Andy Griffith Show" (1962) as Mr. McBeevee
- How the West Was Won (1962) as Train Conductor (uncredited)
- The Birds (1963) as Drunken Doomsayer in Diner
- The Man from Galveston (1963) as Sheriff
- The Prize (1963) as Hilding
- The Sword in the Stone (1963) as Merlin (voice)
- Major Dundee (1965) as Captain Waller
- The Sons of Katie Elder (1965) as Doc Isdell
- The Cincinnati Kid (1965) as Mr. Rudd
- Seconds (1966) as Dr. Morris
- The Rat Patrol (1967) as Colonel Seidner
- Hogan's Heroes (1967) as Dr. Karl Svenson
- Brighty of the Grand Canyon (1967) as Theodore Roosevelt
- Hour of the Gun (1967) as Dr. Charles Goodfellow
- ...tick...tick...tick... (1970) as Frank Braddock Sr.
- The Wild Country (1970) as Jensen
- Vanishing Point (1971) as Sam, Clerk at Delivery Agency
- Ulzana's Raid (1972) as Willy Rukeyser
- Emergency! (1974) (Season 3 Episode 16: "Messin' Around") as Gus

== Partial stage appearances ==
Year	Title	Role	Venue	Notes	Ref.
1930	The Glass of Water	Thompson	American Laboratory Theatre, New York		
1931	Miracle at Verdun	Andre Veron	Martin Beck Theatre, New York	Credited as 'Peter Wayne'	
1932	Carry Nation	Vigilante Leader	Biltmore Theatre, New York		
1932	Carry Nation	Vigilante Leader	U.S. tour		
1933	One Sunday Afternoon	Rowdy	Little Theatre, New York		
1933	One Sunday Afternoon	Rowdy	48th Street Theatre, New York		
1933	One Sunday Afternoon	Rowdy	Boulevard Theatre, Jackson Heights		
1933	One Sunday Afternoon	Rowdy	Plymouth Theatre, Boston		
1934	House of Remsen	John Crooks	Henry Miller's Theatre, New York		
1935	It's You I Want	Jimmy Watts	Cort Theatre, New York		
1935	Panic	Young Man	Imperial Theatre, New York		
1944	A Highland Fling	Rabbie MacGregor	Plymouth Theatre, New York		
1944	The Man Who Had All the Luck	David Beeves	Forrest Theatre, New York		
1968	In the Matter of J. Robert Oppenheimer	Edward Teller	Mark Taper Forum, Los Angeles		

== Listen to ==
- Radio Detective Story Hour: Karl Swenson in Mr. Chameleon
