= Flambeau (character) =

Hercule Flambeau
- First appearance: The Blue Cross
- Created by: G.K. Chesterton
- Portrayed by: Paul Lukas; Bill Griffis; Peter Finch; Siegfried Lowitz; Dennis Burgess; Olivier Pierre; John Light

In-universe information
- Gender: Male
- Occupation: Thief; Detective
- Nationality: French

Hercule Flambeau is a fictional character created by English novelist G. K. Chesterton, who appears in 16 short stories about the character Father Brown. A master criminal, his surname "Flambeau" is an alias, the French word for a flaming torch.

He first appeared in the story "The Blue Cross" as a jewel thief. Father Brown foiled his attempted crimes in this and several other stories. As a notorious and elusive criminal, Flambeau is a worry for law-enforcers. He is exposed by Father Brown, and later becomes a detective himself. His last appearance as a thief occurs in "The Flying Stars", in which Father Brown persuades him to return his loot and to give up the criminal life. As a reformed criminal, Flambeau assists Father Brown in a number of other short stories, beginning with "The Invisible Man".

Although Brown and Flambeau spend much of the day together in "The Blue Cross", when they meet again in "The Queer Feet", Brown recognizes Flambeau but the thief has no recollection of the priest.

He becomes Flambeau's friend before he reforms him, and uses this friendship to transform him. In "The Secret of Flambeau", Flambeau credits Father Brown for his reformation when he says, "Have I not heard the sermons of the righteous? [...] Do you think all that ever did anything but make me laugh? Only my friend told me that he knew exactly why I stole, and I have never stolen since."

Flambeau's fate is revealed in "The Secret of Father Brown". Retiring as a detective, he marries and settles in a Spanish castle, raises a large family and lives in a blissful state of domesticity. Flambeau gives up his assumed name and returns to using his birth name, Duroc.

It has been suggested that Agatha Christie's famous detective Hercule Poirot was inspired by the character.

== Film, television and radio adaptations ==
Flambeau has appeared in several film, television and radio adaptations. Actors who have portrayed him include:

- Paul Lukas – Father Brown, Detective (1934 film)
- Bill Griffis – The Adventures of Father Brown (1945 radio series)
- Peter Finch – Father Brown/The Detective (US title) (1954 film)
- Siegfried Lowitz – Das schwarze Schaf (The Black Sheep) (1960 film)
- Dennis Burgess – Father Brown (1974 TV series)
- Olivier Pierre – Father Brown Stories (1984–1986 BBC Radio series)
- John Light – Father Brown (2013 TV series) (Episodes: S1 E10 "The Blue Cross", S2 E5 "The Mysteries of the Rosary", S3 E10 "The Judgment of Man", S4 E5 "The Daughter of Autolycus", S5 E15 "The Penitent Man", S6 E10 "The Two Deaths of Hercule Flambeau", S7 E10 "The Honourable Thief", S8 E5 "The Folly of Jephthah", S9 E5 "The Final Devotion", S9 E10 "The Red Death", S10 E5 "The Hidden Man", S11 E5 "The Father, The Son", S12 E5 "The Cup of Calabria”, and S13 E5 “The Shadow of Lazarus”.)
