= Father Brown, Detective =

1934 film by Edward Sedgwick

- Directed by: Edward Sedgwick
- Screenplay by: Henry Myers; C. Gardner Sullivan
- Produced by: Edward Sedgwick; Bayard Veiller
- Starring: Walter Connolly; Paul Lukas; Gertrude Michael
- Cinematography: Theodor Sparkuhl
- Edited by: James Smith
- Music by: Composer: title music (uncredited): Heinz Roemheld
- Production company: Paramount Productions
- Distributed by: Paramount Pictures
- Release date: December 14, 1934 (USA)
- Running time: 68 minutes
- Country: United States
- Language: English

Father Brown, Detective is a 1934 American mystery film directed by Edward Sedgwick and starring Walter Connolly, Paul Lukas and Gertrude Michael. It is based on the 1910 Father Brown story "The Blue Cross" by G. K. Chesterton.

== Plot ==
When infamous jewel thief Flambeau announces his intention to steal stones from a diamond cross in Father Brown's church, the crime-solving cleric fights to retain the cross, and also to save the soul of the elusive Flambeau.

== Cast ==
- Walter Connolly as Father Brown
- Paul Lukas as Flambeau
- Gertrude Michael as Evelyn Fischer
- Robert Loraine as Inspector Valentine
- Halliwell Hobbes as Sir Leopold Fischer
- Una O'Connor as Mrs. Boggs
- E.E. Clive as Sergeant
- Donald Gray as Don
- Bunny Beatty as Jenny
- Peter Hobbes as Peter
- King Baggot as Priest
- Douglas Gerrard as Constable
- Robert Adair as Policeman
- Gwenllian Gill as Flowershop Girl
- Fred Walton as Waiter
- Alyce Ardell as Maid
