= The Incredulity of Father Brown =

Short story collection by G. K. Chesterton

- First edition
- Author: G. K. Chesterton
- Language: English
- Series: Father Brown
- Genre: Detective fiction
- Publisher: Cassell & Co.
- Publication date: 1926
- Publication place: United Kingdom
- Media type: Print (hardcover)
- Pages: 296
- OCLC: 24972857
- Preceded by: The Wisdom of Father Brown
- Followed by: The Secret of Father Brown

The Incredulity of Father Brown is a collection of eight stories by G. K. Chesterton, the third-published collection featuring the fictional detective Father Brown. It was first published as a book in 1926 by Cassell of London, whose monthly Cassell's Magazine featured the last of the eight stories in its April number, illustrated by Stanley Lloyd.

== Contents ==
The 8 stories in this collection are:

- "The Resurrection of Father Brown"
- "The Arrow of Heaven"
- "The Oracle of the Dog"
- "The Miracle of Moon Crescent"
- "The Curse of the Golden Cross"
- "The Dagger with Wings"
- "The Doom of the Darnaways"
- "The Ghost of Gideon Wise"

According to The FictionMags Index, the first story was original to the collection; the last was published in the April 1926 number of Cassell's Magazine; the six intermediate stories had appeared in Nash's Pall Mall Magazine from December 1923 to July 1925, in a different sequence.

== Summaries ==
=== The Resurrection of Father Brown ===
The scene begins with an American journalist named Paul Snaith critically assessing Father Brown's church and the other clerics there. He quickly changes his mind to please the famous businessman, Mendoza, who walks in with a lavish respect for the Church. Snaith then goes on a journalistic quest to make Father Brown's name great. Meanwhile in South America, Brown quickly begins to resent his growing fame and after dealing with his likewise growing workload (including endorsing a wine for a man named Eckstein and responding to a letter from a political rival named Alvarez), he goes out on a walk at night. During this walk, as he passes under a bridge, he is attacked by two mysterious men and left injured or killed.

The story shifts over to John Adams Race, an electrical engineer from America who was hired by Mendoza to improve the same small South American town in which Father Brown resides. Race, Chesterton says, is a man who is firmly attached to his Protestant and American background, despite not particularly being devoted to them, and in spite of himself, Race sees in Father Brown a reminder of what he loves about his upbringing. The story flashes back to show Race looking out his window to see Father Brown pass by in the night, soon followed by two other men. Race identifies these men as Eckstein and Dr. Calderon, a physician who attended to Mendoza. Race follows the two men out of suspicion, and immediately after they both disappear under the bridge after Brown does, where there are sounds of a fight.

A mob gathers around the scene and identifies Father Brown to be dead. As Race nears the bridge, Snaith comes out to confirm the story and describe what appears to have happened. As Race looks at the body of Brown, Alvarez, who is also near the body quickly claims to have no part in the murder. Mendoza and Dr. Calderon enter the scene as well, and again pronounce Father Brown dead.

A funeral is held for the simple priest, in which Mendoza decides to give a long, drawn-out speech. In his ramblings, he attacks all atheists, and is soon in a fiery argument with Alvarez, who rages against resurrection of the dead in part of his argument. Snaith silences the two by claiming that Father Brown is beginning to move. Father Brown then sits up and the mob attending the funeral becomes a frenzy of excitement about the event. Father Brown tries without success to calm the crowd, but when he is unable, he runs to the telegraph office to send to the Bishop's secretary that there was no miracle that had happened.

John Race walks Father Brown back to the church, where Brown begins to attempt to solve his own murder case.

As Brown describes his assault, he seems to indicate that it was faked. He says the weapons used against him never actually hit him, but instead he seemed to collapse and faint of some unknown source. He mentions to Race that the wine from Eckstein may have been drugged, and Race, who started as a druggist before coming to engineering, confirms the suspicion. In a flash of intuition, Brown realizes the schemes of his would-be murderers and recounts the details to Race. The plan was to fake the priest's death, then debunk it in order to show Brown as a sham. Brown concludes, saying he must go thank God that he was saved from disgrace and that he had so quickly contacted the Bishop with an unknowing counter-claim to the antagonists' plot against him and inviting Race to a drink of un-drugged wine.

=== The Arrow of Heaven ===
The story opens with Father Brown stepping off of a ship into America. He is immediately assaulted by journalists, then finally, upon answering their many questions, spoke with a tall man in goggles. The man asked if Brown was looking for "Captain Wain" and introduced himself as Norman Drage. The goggled man rambled on a little while and the simple priest was left very confused. Soon the two were driving with Captain Peter Wain down the road, as Wain and Drage recounted stories of two recent murders connected with a mystical "Coptic cup" by a notorious man known only as Daniel Doom.

An associate of Wain's uncle came into possession of this cup; the man was named Merton. As Wain explains, the previous two owners began receiving threatening letters from Doom before their murders, and at the death of the last victim, the widow was forced to sell many possessions the family had owned; Merton apparently purchased this cup, and presumably has begun to receive threatening letters.

When the three arrive at Merton's enormous mansion, just as they are about to enter, Drage stops and says that Merton would be too happy to see him, and leaves. Father Brown is curious at this behavior and as he surveys the house, notes with a surprise how thoroughly guarded it is. Wain describes how important Merton is to the world and how vital it is that he is protected while Father Brown laments how caged he must be.

As the pair is about to go into a safe-room to meet with Mr. Merton, Wain's uncle (Crake) and Merton's lawyer walk out, having just talked with him about business for a while. Soon Mr. Wilton (the secretary to Mr. Merton) comes out of the safe room to announce that Merton will be available in ten minutes. He also tells the priest of Merton's schedule and of having only fifteen minutes alone every day to worship the Coptic Cup. He brags of the defenses he apparently devised to protect Merton and claims them to be near- impenetrable. After Brown comments that Wilton seems to be more intent on catching the murderer than saving Merton, the secretary reveals that one of the previous victims of Daniel Doom was his father, so he means to protect Merton, but is very personally connected with catching the killer.

Father Brown remarks that it is time to go in to speak with the millionaire, and as he walks into the inner room, he reveals Merton to have been shot with an arrow and murdered.

Crake, having a history with Red Indian war tactics, along with his nephew Captain Wain, are implied to be suspects of Father Brown's search to find the murderer and over the course of a few weeks, he speaks with each of them. Potentially, Wain flew a plane over or near the mansion, while his uncle shot Merton with an arrow through an open window. Both men are astounded to realize Brown's possible story of the event, but the priest refuses to comment on his thoughts.

Soon a conversation with Drage ensues. Whereas previously he was very finely dressed and upbeat, he is now bitter and appears to be clothed much more shabbily. He seems glad that Mr. Merton has died, and praises old Eastern technology and religion that more or less would have helped kill him. Brown quickly dismisses the possibility of Drage having killed Merton, leaving Drage shocked at Brown's statement that he had needed the victim and would never have killed him.

After another interlude, Father Brown meets with a council of many people who had contact with Merton. There he debunks the idea that Drage could have killed the man, and instead claims that the arrow that was found in the victim most likely had been used to stab him, and later configured to appear as if it had been shot. Further, the priest explains that Wain and Crake could not have been the murderer either. He breaks in to then say that after speaking to Wilton, that Wilton had killed Doom in some wild struggle. Everyone in the room applauds Wilton's brash justice.

After much questioning, Father Brown reveals that Merton had been Daniel Doom and that Wilton, having hunted for so long to find him, finally killed him in vengeance of his father. The group becomes conflicted and angry, and Brown comments on the necessity of consistency in the case, pausing to mention that by now, Wilton is long gone.

=== The Oracle of the Dog ===
In the beginning of this story, Father Brown is petting a dog, next to a young man named Fiennes. The young man informs him of a recent murder and shows him a newspaper clipping describing the details of the case.

A man named Colonel Druce was murdered in his summer home on the coast of Yorkshire. Apparently, he was stabbed to death in his room, but the murder weapon is nowhere to be found. His son, daughter, and secretary all had no idea the murder took place, despite the home having only one entrance down a straight path through the garden. A man named Dr. Valentine (fiance of Miss Druce) was nearby and Druce's lawyer Aubrey Traill had just met with the Colonel, and both confirmed this story as well. Shortly after Traill met with the Colonel, his daughter came in to see him, only to find his body on the ground.

Fiennes reveals he had been walking a dog with Druce's nephews (Herbert and Harry) near the summer house when the man was murdered. He describes the secretary and the lawyer to Brown, and then goes on to tell of how ominous the walk felt and how the dog howled at just the moment before Druce's daughter found the body, when previously it had been chasing a walking stick that Harry Druce had thrown into the water. As Fiennes and the nephews neared the house, Fiennes reports that Traill was just leaving and looked happy when normally he was downcast or unpleasant. Just then the dog had started barking furiously at the lawyer, who seemed to flee away.

The priest jumps up after this description and scolds Fiennes for being superstitious and believing that a dog could condemn a man. Fiennes argues by saying that the lawyer had a tie pin that potentially could have fit a stiletto into it. He then goes on to say that one of the nephews who was with him (Harry) had former training as a detective. Harry had seen the dog growl at a few people before, including the secretary (Patrick Floyd), and growling was a better predictor of a dog's anger than barking. Additionally, Harry had found blood on the shears Floyd was using to trim the garden at the time.

At Brown's prompting, Fiennes further reveals that Traill had been in the house to help revise the Colonel's will and that the original witnesses of the signing were Dr. Valentine and the secretary. The secretary had gotten angry with Dr. Valentine for having changed his name at some point, which invalidated the will, to which Valentine made a comment attacking Americans. Druce was very angry at the doctor for this, and later Miss Druce and the doctor were seen whispering to each other something about murder.

Brown suggests perhaps the couple had worked together to kill the Colonel (the will was primarily favoring the daughter), at which Fiennes is appalled. Brown says he cannot do much to actually uncover the situation, but that Fiennes should continue searching and perhaps speak again with Harry Druce.

Several days later, Fiennes comes back, reporting Harry Druce to have committed suicide. Brown states that it was likely to have been the course of action after young Druce realized he had killed his uncle for nothing, after not having been written into the will. Fiennes is aghast and asks Brown to explain the murder.

As Brown describes it, the change of name by the doctor was from a French noble's title to the old family surname (Brown had heard of the family before). As a point of French etiquette, he considered challenging the secretary to a duel because of the debate of his name, while the Colonel's daughter tried to dissuade him from this.

Brown tells of how important the dog was to solving the crime, to which Fiennes remarks that it is surprising for him to suddenly trust in the instincts of a dog. The priest mentions that if people were not as superstitious about dogs as they were, then the animals could be used to actually help. He lays out the type of men that the secretary and the lawyer were: nervous, jumpy men; the type to scare suddenly and cut themselves on garden sheers when a girl screams, as well as the type that dogs would instinctively distrust.

Dogs are very straightforward, he says. They bark at people they do not like and people are afraid of dogs that do not like them. However, the murderer would have no fear of a witness who could not talk. Moreover, dogs pursue with everything they have in themselves. So the whine for not having found the walking stick that Harry Druce threw into the water was most likely because the stick had sunk and could not be found. That is, it had to house a sword used to kill the Colonel.

=== The Miracle of Moon Crescent ===
The story opens with a man named Warren Wynd sorting letters in an apartment in the town of Moon Crescent. Wynd is described to have an uncanny gift for snap decisions (apparently there is a story of him being approached by three beggars, two of which he immediately sent away, the third going on to be a useful personal assistant of his). A millionaire oil magnate named Silas Vandam is with him in the room, along with Wynd's personal servant (Wilson) and private secretary (Fenner Collins). Soon, the man dismisses the three of them so he can attend to more work.

In the hall, a man named Alboin comes to speak with Wynd. He speaks of a new atheist religion that Wynd will want to know about. The secretary refuses him access, along with Father Brown who mysteriously appears as part of the group, with no explanation. Brown insists on getting into the room to ensure Wynd is alright, due to having spoken with a man he had helped previously who called some curse down upon Warren Wynd and after doing so, fired a blank shot under Wynd's window.

Brown insists on checking, and Alboin soon strides forward to simply open the door. However, inside, Wynd is gone. Soon they call the authorities and answer questions until nightfall, at which point they leave and walk around Moon Crescent together. As they look into the distance, they see what appears to be a broken branch in a tree, but as the group gets closer to it, they soon recognize it to be the body of Wynd, who apparently hanged himself on the tree.

The police were soon pelting the group with questions again, making sure to avoid any superstition. Newspapers and magazines picked up the tale too, and attempted to give nearly the exact opposite effect, raving of Father Brown's mysterious intuition and the superstitions involved in the group. The police hired a famous psychologist named Dr. Vair to speak with the witnesses in order to more accurately assess what happened in the events of Wynd's death.

The professor begins to interrogate the group (without Father Brown) and attempts to convince them that Brown pulled some sort of trick in order to convince them to believe in a supernatural manner of Wynd's death. Collins becomes fed up with these accusations of their apparent lunacy or whatever else, and brings the rest of the group to talk with the priest about why the events happened the way they did.

They bring Father Brown in to Wynd's office a few days later to sign an official report of a miracle. They want Brown to sign first as an honor for having spotted it first; he politely refuses. The group is confounded and asks why, and Father Brown explains the whole event was in fact natural.

The shot, Brown explains, caused the victim to initially look out his window. Immediately, Wilson, who was a big strong man, from the floor above (where he was sent to collect papers) slipped a noose around Wynd's neck and hoisted him up, killing him. An unknown third man likely helped to get the body out to the tree, far away from the apartment, where the group found him hanging. As Brown reveals, these men were likely the three homeless men that Wynd sized up many years ago and passed off without having known them.

=== The Curse of the Golden Cross ===
This mystery starts in the Moravia, a ship travelling to England. Immediately introduced are Professor Smaill and Lady Diana Wales, along with the ship's register, Paul Tarrant. Also sitting at the table, Chesterton says, are Father Brown and a man named Leonard Smyth.

The group has a conversation on the Byzantine empire, Smaill's specialty, and at the end, Brown points out that the professor mostly avoided the subject altogether. The professor seems to instantly trust Brown and launches into a description of some recently discovered tomb in Sussex. In it was found a special cross that has great importance to history, but a fabled curse as well. However, as he describes it, the curse seems more likely a conspiracy.

Smaill jumps into another tale of his own golden cross, the only one similar to the other that has just been uncovered. Upon finding it in a labyrinth in Greece, Smaill realized there was a man following him in the ancient catacombs. The man threatened him and promised that someday he would murder the professor, were the cross not given up. Every now and then, the man still sends the professor notes to tell him that the plans for murder are going well. Smaill describes him as a cold, methodical man, likely from the West, due to the detached sense of a collector simply trying to find the prize. With the discovery of the new cross, the mad-man apparently increased his threats sevenfold and is desperate that Smaill never get his hands on the second cross.

The professor and the priest disembark to go to the tomb and upon arriving, find the entire group from the dinner table already at the tomb with them. The group meets with the Vicar of the church under which the tomb was found, and begins to explore the dark caverns leading to the golden cross. They finally reach the room in which the cross is held, and just as Smaill reaches out to touch the cross, the large stone slab of the coffin the cross is lying in slams shut, smashing the professor painfully in the head.

It is found out, after the professor is taken to a nearby doctor, that the Vicar has died by suicide. Father Brown goes to speak with the dinner party group, who then is ranting about the curse and how it will destroy them all. Brown dismisses this notion and tells of the falsehoods in the history of the stories associated with the tomb. Additionally, the cross seemed to be rigged to a small wooden peg that was holding the casket open. When the professor pulled the cross, the peg fell out, shutting the coffin, and hitting him in the head. But Brown reveals it was really the vicar who had been in the coffin; the maniac who had been pursuing Smaill thought that he had finally committed the murder and wanted to end his own life abruptly. Smaill recovers after a while and the group is able to go on with their lives in peace.

=== The Dagger with Wings ===
The renowned priest is called up one day by a doctor/ policeman named Dr. Boyne. A man named Aylmer had three sons and an adopted son named John Strake; when he died, he left a great fortune to Strake, but the three sons disputed the case with the law and managed to get the inheritance. Strake swore he would kill all three, and so far two are dead. Arnold Aylmer is the last alive and he is requesting police protection. The other two brothers died of apparent suicide or accident, but there is a chance Strake had managed to simply kill them masterfully and get away with it. Aylmer is now demanding police protection after his servants left because of his increasing agitation and impatience. Boyne admits that Father Brown is called in to be a compromise to Aylmer's demand.

When Brown gets to the mansion, it is dark and lonesome. He cannot get in, nor does there appear to be anyone at home. The place appears to have been barricaded. Finally, Father Brown manages to climb in through a window and is immediately confronted by a ragged Aylmer. The two begin to speak, and Aylmer recounted the deaths of both of his brothers and seeing a shadowy figure before their deaths, near the scenes of their murders. On the body of both men, notes were found with winged daggers on the notes, similar to threatening notes they had received before.

Aylmer brings the priest another note he had recently received with similar design and shows off a blunderbuss capable of firing silver bullets. He speaks a good deal about superstition and when he goes upstairs to get a picture of Strake to show Brown, the priest calls the police office to request backup.

Suddenly, there is a shout and the sound of gunfire, and Father Brown finds himself soon standing over the body of Strake along with Aylmer, who apparently shot him in some sort of confused vision of some sort. The man is satisfied that he has finally killed the apparent murderer of his brothers and goes back into his house to have a drink.

Aylmer tries then incessantly to convince Brown of some sort of universal existence among all things, which Brown denies. The priest then convicts Aylmer as the true John Strake for having killed the last of the brothers, just as the police arrive to detain Strake, who is even boastful of his murders.

As Boyne probes for answers, Brown uncovers the murder. Just as Brown had been entering the house, Strake had killed the last brother. He quickly swapped clothing and being much larger than Aylmer, hung the body in a cloak on the hat-stand, putting a hat over the head to cover it up. Then he put on the victim's nightgown in order to pretend to be Aylmer, and went down to meet Brown.
