= Charles Darwin University Nursing Museum =

Museum in Northern Territory, Australia

- Established: 1987
- Location: Darwin, NT, Australia
- Coordinates: 12.372234°S 130.868523°E
- Curator: Janie Mason

The Charles Darwin University Nursing Museum preserves and promotes nursing heritage in the Northern Territory of Australia. It is located at Charles Darwin University in Darwin.

== Establishment ==
The nursing museum was established in 1987, when the first pre-service nursing program began at Charles Darwin University. Its collection of photographs, artefacts, instruments and memorabilia aims to preserve and promote nursing heritage in the Northern Territory.

== Recent history ==
The museum features two permanent displays and is largely staffed by volunteers.

In 2017 the museum received a grant of $12,300 through the Regional Museums Grants Support Program.

The museum also curates special occasional exhibitions, such as, e.g., "Hospital to Charles Darwin University – a Northern Territory story" (2014), "Thirty years of tertiary nursing studies in the Northern Territory" (2013), "Nightingale: icon or past image? The Territory’s first nurse" (2011), "The year of the Nurse: Territory Nurses of Note" (2010).

== Catalogue ==
A catalogue of the objects in the museum may be found at the collecting bug: CDU Nursing Museum and shows images and details of over 2000 artefacts.

== Notable Northern Territory nurses ==
- Rona Glynn (1936-1965)
- Ruth Heathcock (1901-1995)
- Ellen Kettle (c.1922-1999)
- Jacqueline Moya O'Brien (1926-2020)
- Olive O'Keeffe (1907-1988)
- Constance Adelaide Stone (1879-1963)
- Hannah Wood (c. 1827-1903)
