= Dearie =

1950 popular song

Song
- Composer: David Mann
- Lyricist: Bob Hilliard

"Dearie" is a popular song. The music was written by David Mann, and the lyrics, by Bob Hilliard. The song was published in 1950.

The song is about reminiscences, and often sung as a duet. When done as a duet, each one of the singers asks the other whether he or she remembers a number of long-ago events, and then says "if you remember, you're much older than I." When sung as a solo, the same questions are directed at the audience.

It makes a string of pseudo-nostalgic references: to Orville Wright's first powered flight near Kitty Hawk, North Carolina; waltzing to the John Philip Sousa band; "Picking up Pittsburgh on a crystal set" refers to KDKA (AM), the first commercial broadcast radio station in the United States; the "running board on a Chandler Six" refers to a six-cylinder automobile of the same era as Henry Ford's famous Tin Lizzy; "Movie stars of the silent era", including Charlie Chaplin and Jackie Coogan, are mentioned as making you laugh and then cry; "Watching John L. win every fight, 'cause nobody ducked from Sullivan's right" refers to John L. Sullivan (1858-1918), the heavyweight boxing champion.

== Recordings ==
In 1950, some of the best-known versions were recorded by Guy Lombardo and the Royal Canadians (with a vocal by Kenny Gardner), Jo Stafford and Gordon MacRae, Ray Bolger and Ethel Merman, and Lisa Kirk and Fran Warren.

The Guy Lombardo record was recorded on January 26, 1950, and released by Decca Records (catalog number 24899). It first reached the Billboard chart on March 31, 1950, and lasted nine weeks on the chart, peaking at number 5.

The Jo Stafford/Gordon MacRae record was recorded on January 14, 1950, and released by Capitol Records (catalog number 858). It first reached the Billboard chart on March 3, 1950, and lasted 11 weeks on the chart, peaking at number 12.

The Ray Bolger/Ethel Merman record was recorded on January 4, 1950, and released by Decca (catalog number 24873). It first reached the Billboard chart on March 3, 1950, and lasted 11 weeks on the chart, peaking at number 13. The B-side of this recording, "I Said My Pajamas (and Put on My Pray'rs)," also charted.

The Lisa Kirk/Fran Warren record was released by RCA Victor Records as a 78 rpm single (catalog number 20-3696) and a 45 rpm single (catalog number 47-3220). It first reached the Billboard chart on April 7, 1950, and lasted two weeks on the chart, peaking at number 29.

The various versions of the song (combined, as was normal for Cash Box) reached number 4 on their Best-Selling Records chart.

In the UK, there were contemporary cover versions released by Bob and Alf Pearson (as part of their medley "In Big Bits of Big Hits"), The Five Smith Brothers, Ted Ray and Kitty Bluett, Billy Ternent and his Orchestra (with vocals by Eva Beynon and Bobby Breen), Joe Loss and his Orchestra, and Donald Peers. Ray and Bluett were playing a married couple in the BBC Radio comedy show Ray's a Laugh at the time. Their recording features lyrics adapted for British audiences, who may not have understood all the American references.

== Recorded versions ==
- Ray Bolger and Ethel Merman (recorded January 4, 1950)
- Bing Crosby
- Lisa Kirk and Fran Warren (1950), reissued on compact disc on the 2003 album Let's Fall in Love
- Guy Lombardo and his Royal Canadians (Kenny Gardner and The Lombardo Trio) (recorded January 26, 1950)
- Mary Martin
- Jo Stafford and Gordon MacRae (January 14, 1950)
- Bob and Alf Pearson (as part of their medley "In Big Bits of Big Hits") on British Parlophone
- Ted Ray and Kitty Bluett (on British Columbia)
- Billy Cotton and Kathie Kay on their 1961 album Bill and Kate
- The Five Smith Brothers
- Billy Ternent and his Orchestra (vocals by Eva Beynon and Bobby Breen)
- Joe Loss and his Orchestra
- Donald Peers
- George Towne and his Orchestra (vocals by The Satisfyers)
- Mary Ellen Quartet (Mary Ellen, Bob Scott and Quartet)

The song was featured on the Lawrence Welk Show, later available via PBS, entitled: "Do You Remember?"

Dennis Day performed a version on The Jack Benny Program on April 9, 1950, with the final verse directed at "Jackie" instead of "dearie", reminiscing on the life of Jack Benny, who chimes in with a very off-key "I'm thirty-nine" as the penultimate line.
