= Kitty Bluett =

English-Australian actress (1914–1994)

- Bluett from a 1954 newspaper article
- Born: Katherine Zeppe Bluett; 18 August 1914; Brixton, London, England
- Died: 27 July 1994 (aged 79); Colchester, England
- Other names: Kathleen Zeppy Jover; Mrs Portingale; Mrs Catherine Zepp-Portingale; Katherine Zeppe Jover
- Known for: Radio personality
- Spouses: Walter Robert Portingale (m. 1941; div. 1947) Julian Manuel Jover (m. 1955; div. 1980)
- Children: 1
- Family: Fred Bluett (father); Augustus "Gus" Bluett (brother); Jimmy Jewel (brother-in-law)

Kitty Bluett (18 August 1916 – 27 July 1994) was an English-Australian actress and singer for radio, television and film. She played Ted Ray's wife on the BBC radio show Ray's a Laugh from 1949 to 1961, the "longest running husband-wife radio show ever" with an estimated audience of 10 million. She appeared in several films, including A Son Is Born (1946), alongside Ron Randell. Bluett was the first female radio DJ in Australia.

== Early life ==
Kitty Bluett was the third child of vaudevillian performer Fred Bluett and dressmaker Catherine (Katie) McKechnie. She had an older brother, Augustus "Gus" Bluett, a comedian, and a sister, Belle. When Bluett was 10 weeks old, her family moved to Australia. She attended school in Australia, New Zealand and South Africa, as her family moved around performing.

== Australian career (1916–1948) ==
Bluett first appeared on stage aged two-and-a-half in her father's vaudeville act at the Sydney Tivoli theatre, when she played "Boy Scout No. 5". As a child, she learnt tap dancing, ballet, singing and impersonation. When she was 12 she began doing impressions of Greta Garbo and ZaSu Pitts. She performed as part of her father's act for 15 years. Between 1940 and 1948, Bluett appeared on the Australian stage and screen. For the radio she was a Colgate-Palmolive radio artist where her professional partner was Dick Bentley.

She appeared on the front cover of Radio Pictorial of Australia magazine in April 1940 and the front cover of The ABC Weekly in November 1940. A 1941 newspaper article called her "possibly the leading comedienne in Australia to-day."

=== Film ===
Year	Title	Director
1934	Cinesound Varieties	Ken G. Hall
1942	A Yank in Australia	Alfred J. Goulding
1946	A Son Is Born	Eric Porter
1949	What a Carry On!	John E. Blakeley

=== Radio ===
- 1937: A Cockney Cameo with Fred Bluett
- 1940: Dr Davey, the Happiest Man on Earth Jack Davey's S'nday night show
- 1940: Mirthquake
- 1941: Out of the Bag with Dick Bentley and Joy Nichols
- 1941: Bachelor Mother for 2GB Radio Theatre
- 1941: Melody Riddles with Harry Dearth
- 1941: Black Velvet at the Tivoli
- 1941: The Cowboy and the Lady with Eric Bush and Pat Kennedy
- 1942: Dithering with Davey with Jack Davey and Betty Bryant
- Early 1940s: Rhythm Inn with Don Baker
- 1949: Meet the Girl Friend with John Bushelle

In 1942 Bluett made front page news for a "risqué" on-air joke she made about "flimsy nightdresses" which led to the threat of her being removed from broadcasting. The Chief Radio Inspector had received complaints from the Good Film and Radio Vigilance League among others, and required Bluett to satisfactorily explain the joke, which she had made on Ladies First, compered by Jack Davey. The case was dropped within weeks. Of the incident, Bluett was reported as saying, "I think it's silly. If people are going to think that way and see double meanings, they shouldn't listen."

=== Live performance ===
Bluett would often play the role of soubrette (a 'saucy or flirtatious young woman’' in theatre productions.

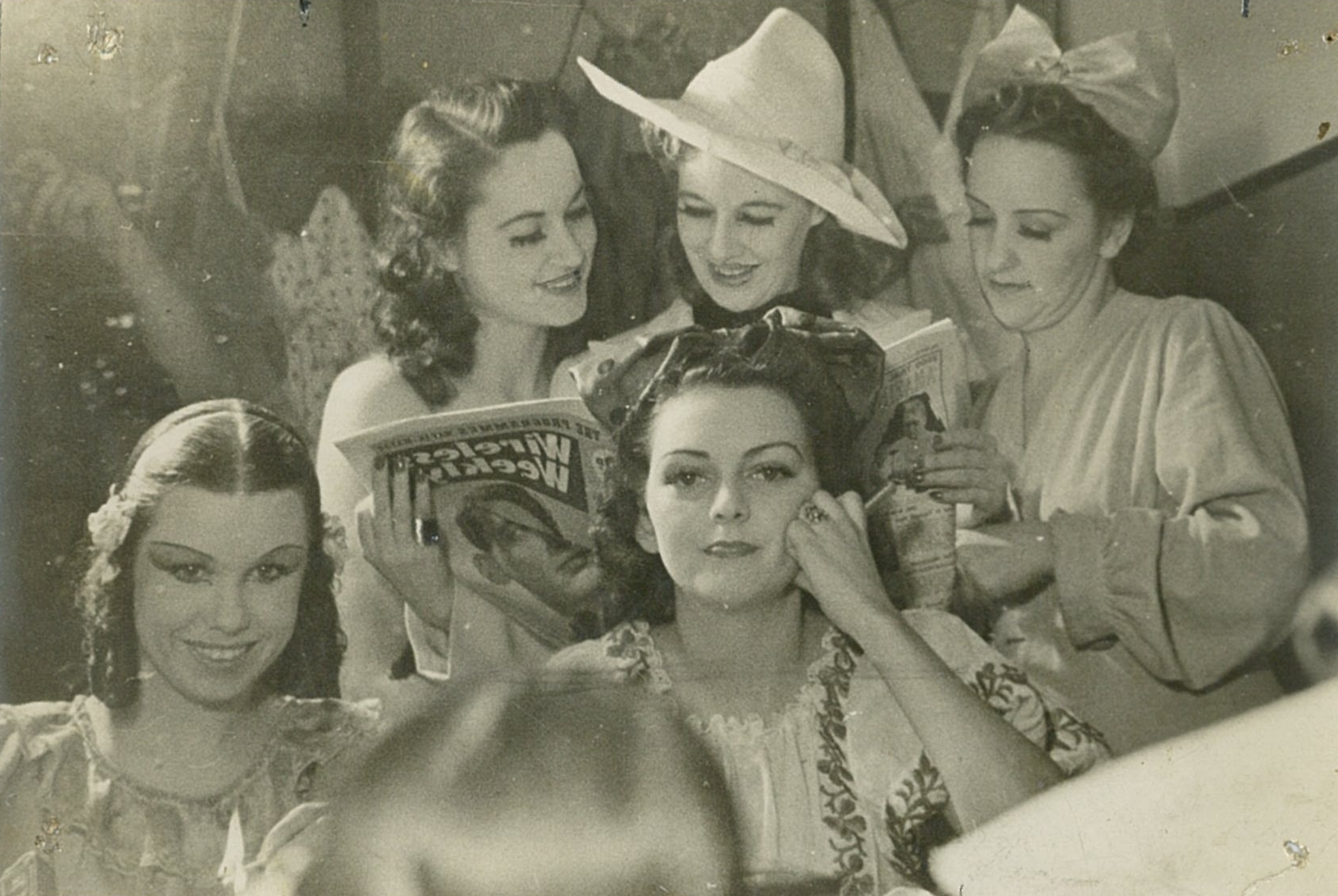
Bluett, Betty Bryant, Joan Robbins and Moya Beaver for the J. C. Williamson production Funny Side Up (1941)

- 1933: No, No, Nanette, Over She Goes and Swinging Along Dir. George Gee
- 1936: The Jesters with her father, Fred Bluett
- 1937: J. C. Williamson’' corps de ballet - she became a soloist in 1938
- 1938: No, No Nanette in Melbourne
- 1939: Singer at Romano’' restaurant, Sydney
- 1940: Singer at Century Theatre, Sydney with Desmond Tanner
- 1941: Funny Side Up at Theatre Royal, Brisbane with Dick Bentley
- 1941 Funny Side Frolics at His Majesty’' Theatre, Melbourne
- 1942: Point Valaine by Noël Coward at Minerva Theatre, Sydney
- 1943: Janie Dir. Alec Coppel at Minerva Theatre, Sydney
- 1944: The Patsy at Theatre Royal, Sydney
- 1949: Ice Vogues at The Stoll Dir. Tom Arnold

=== War service ===
Between 1943 and 1944, Bluett, together with Gladys Moncrieff, Bebe Scott and Flo Patonhe, were the first women to travel to New Guinea to entertain the Australian troops. While she was there, the American Marines made her an honorary Lieutenant.

In 1945 she appeared in Calling the Stars show, in support of the Fourth Victory Loan.

In 1952 she performed for R.A.A.F. Fighter Wing 78, based in Malta on garrison duties post-WWII. She also entertained troops stationed in Tripoli, Cyrenaica and the Suez Canal zone.

=== Hollywood ===
In March 1947 Bluett travelled to America for six months. Her final appearance in Australia before she left was at a variety show in aid of the Miss Australia Quest in Sydney Town Hall. Before leaving for the States she told an interviewer, "I feel completely frustrated in Australian radio. For some time, I have been relegated to straight roles. That’s not good for a comedienne."

Although the trip was ostensibly a holiday, while she was in the States, Bluett appeared in the following:

- A show with Jack Benny
- Vacation from Marriage (Perfect Strangers), a play with Van Heflin and Valerie Hobson
- Two episodes of Cecil B. DeMille’' Lux Radio Theatre
- A serial with Henry Fonda
- A play with Lana Turner and John Garfield

She also met Ginger Rogers, Esther Williams and Maureen O'Hara. She returned to Australia in September, "a bit disillusioned with Hollywood", but still returned to New York in 1948 to appear in a play.

== England (1949–1963) ==
Bluett arrived in England on 1 January 1949 for a six-month holiday to visit her sister Belle, and to replace Belle in her brother-in-law Jimmy Jewel's act for a short time. Bluett's intention was then to carry on to America. However, Dick Bentley had sent her details to the BBC while she was en route to England, and, within a week of arriving, she had signed a contract to appear in Ray’s a Laugh. Before recording started, she squeezed in appearances in a number of shows including Caribbean Rhapsody, Variety Bandbox and Henry Hall's Guest Night.

While living in London, Bluett mixed with the stars of the day. In 1951, while in Paris, Humphrey Bogart and Hoagy Carmichael cut off a foot of her hair to create a "chop cut".

=== Ray's a Laugh (1949–1961) ===
Bluett played the long-running role of Ted Ray's wife, Kitty, a "resigned and intelligent spouse" on BBC radio show Ray's a Laugh from 1949 to 1961. She played the role "for so long that listeners believed Ray was married to Kitty" in real life.

She appeared in all but one of the eleven series. In March 1950, Bluett was offered a role in a separate musical comedy at a "princely salary" but turned it down saying, "it would not be fair on the rest of the cast [of Ray's a Laugh] to leave so suddenly." One London newspaper columnist called this "one of the most unselfish actions this column has ever had the pleasure of recording." Bluett was promoted to Ray's co-star in 1952. In 1954, the Sydney Daily Telegraph reported that, on the strength of her acting in Ray's a Laugh, "the BBC… feels that Kitty Bluett will turn into a "British Lucille Ball."

=== All My Eye and Kitty Bluett (1951) ===
In 1955, a spin-off show, All My Eye and Kitty Bluett, was created specifically as a vehicle for her talents. It first aired on 7 June 1955. The cast of All My Eye... included Stanley Baxter, Terry Scott and Patricia Hayes, and the script writers were Terry Nation and Dick Barry. The show was dropped after one series – called "a disaster" by Nation's biographer Jonathan Bignell – and Bluett returned to Ray's a Laugh for series seven.

=== Theatre ===
- 1949: Charity show at the London Palladium, also featuring Judy Garland and Danny Kaye
- 1950: Bluett appeared in various music halls around London
- 1951: Royal Show at the Windsor Castle Christmas party alongside Peter Sellers, Tony Hancock, Peter Madden and Hattie Jacques
- 1953: An American Comic and Seventy Women charity revue with Jackie Mason. Other guests including Vera Lynn, Betty Driver and Anne Shelton
- 1953: Joy Bells with Bunny Doyle at New Royal Theatre, Bournemouth
- 1954: Royal Command Performance alongside Bob Hope and Laurence Olivier
- 1954: Oliver! at The Vic

Bluett also held regular charity concerts in aid of the police force.

=== Television ===
Bluett did not appear frequently on television. In a 1951 interview, she said, "I don't like television very much. I don't like watching it. Rehearsals are very tedious. I find it confusing and unsatisfactory. It's neither one thing nor the other." She did, however, appear on the following TV programmes:

- 1955: This Is Your Life dedicated to Ted Ray, as a guest
- 1957: It Pays to be Ignorant BBC One with Michael Bentine and Harold Berens
- 1961: The Cheaters ITV
- 1963: The Delo and Daly Show

=== Other radio ===
Bluett became a BBC Radio DJ in 1951. About her role she said, "I'll pick my own records – swing, orchestral and so on – and there'll be plenty of quiet string music for elderly people. I think too many record programme arrangers forget all about them." Her radio appearances included:

- 1949: Show Parade with Bob Monkhouse and Terry Scott
- 1950: You Ain't Heard Nothing Yet with Bob Dyer
- 1951: First Person Plural with Lloyd Berrell
- 1951: Radio Command Performance with Frankie Howerd and Ted Ray
- 1951: Variety Bandbox as part of the Festival of Britain
- 1951: Hello Australia as part of Australia Day
- 1953: British National Radio Show at Earls Court, alongside fellow Australians Shirley Abicair and Anona Winn
- 1953: It's Not Cricket with Bill Kerr. Written: Frank Muir and Denis Norden
- 1953: Australia Fair with Dick Bentley
- 1953: All-Star Bill with Maurice Chevalier and Tessie O'Shea
- 1956: I Flew with Bismarck with Dick Bentley, Miriam Karlin, Georgia Brown, Graham Stark and Harry Rabinowitz. Writer: David Climie
- 1955: Ladder to Fame co-compere with Kenneth Horne, it was "a show for Australians – about Australians – and the success they are enjoying overseas!"
- 1958: Saturday Night on the Light guest

== Return to Australia (1963–1985) ==
Bluett returned to Australia with her husband and daughter in 1963. An article in The Australian Women's Weekly that year described Bluett as "a stalwart in any comedy sketch who can play straight "man" or comedienne at will." Her Australian performances included:

- 1963: Cat on a Hot Tin Roof at Emerald Hill Theatre, Melbourne
- 1963: The Delo and Daly Show Channel HSV7
- 1965: Away From it All radio guest

== Personal life ==
=== Relationships ===
She married musician Walter "Wally" Robert Zepp Portingale at St John's Church, Darlinghurst, in June 1941. Portingale was a member of Jim Gerald's entertainment unit for the A.I.F. They divorced in 1947, with Bluett saying he "objected to her following her profession soon after their marriage". The following year, she moved back to England and became a household name as a radio actor in Ray's a Laugh. She dated actor Ron Randell for six years. They planned to marry but he moved to Hollywood and married actress Elaine Diana Maltzman instead. Randell's marriage to Maltzman did not last, and a year later Randell and Bluett reconciled and once again planned to marry. However Randell got engaged to Amanda Blake and shortly afterwards Bluett got engaged to circus performer Mickey Ashton, although they never married.

As a radio star, Bluett's personal life was frequently reported in the news, to the point that in 1950 she said "My romances have become like a tennis match for the public. First their heads turn one way, then another as I try and make up my mind. It can have a very damaging effect on an artist." Bluett made headlines in 1954 when it was reported that her mother was a "romance breaker" which Bluett denied.

In 1955, Bluett married Julian Jover (1926-2014), an acrobat and variety performer. They met while performing on the same bill at the Birmingham Hippodrome. They had a daughter, Jody, born in 1958. They moved to Australia in 1963, where Jover became a successful children's TV producer. They divorced in 1980. Bluett returned to England in 1985 and died in Colchester.

=== Interests ===
Bluett was a "champion horsewoman" in jumping and cross-country. She received her first pony as a gift in 1936 from her brother Gus. In 1951 she said that her ambition was to "have a sort of ranch and breed horses in Bowral." When she was living in London, she would go horse riding in Rotten Row. Bluett was also "champion swimmer" over 100 and 440 yards, swimming as a pacemaker for visiting Australian swimming teams.

== Discography ==
Bluett is credited on the following recordings:

=== Singles ===
- "Dearie" (1950) with Ted Ray
- "You Can Count on Me" with Ted Ray (1950)
- "If I Knew You Were Comin' I'd've Baked a Cake" with Bill Kerr (1950)
- "Let's Put Out the Lights" with Ted Ray (1951)
- "Easy Come, Easy Go" / "What a Cute Little Hat" (1951)
- "Six Times a Week and Twice on Sunday" (1951)
- "Go to Sleep, Go to Sleep, Go to Sleep" (1951)
- "Telephone Song" (1951)

=== Albums ===
- The Best of Mo with Roy Rene ("Mo") , Dec.1962; a two LP. compilation; (as ' Kitty Bluette '). Festival Records 30,974/5
- Memories of Mo with Roy Rene (1985) LP

She also performed with Ted Heath's band as a guest vocalist.
