= 1984 Australia Day Honours =

The 1984 Australia Day Honours were announced on 26 January 1984 by the Governor General of Australia, Sir Ninian Stephen.

The Australia Day Honours are the first of the two major annual honours lists, announced on Australia Day (26 January), with the other being the Queen's Birthday Honours which are announced on the second Monday in June.

== Order of Australia ==
Order of Australia (Civil) ribbon

Order of Australia (Military) ribbon

=== Companion of the Order of Australia (AC) ===
Recipient	Citation	Notes
Keith Rupert Murdoch	For service to the media, particularly the newspaper industry.	
George Polites CMG MBE	For service to industrial relations.	
Emeritus Professor Eric Aroha Rudd	For service to the mineral and petroleum industries.	

=== Officer of the Order of Australia (AO) ===
==== General Division ====
Recipient	Citation	Notes
David James Asimus	For service to the wool industry.	
Ida Isobel Bennett	For service to marine science.	
Robert Lindsay Bienvenu DFC	For service to commerce and the community.	
The Honourable Reginald Bishop	For service to politics and government.	
Professor Ralph Beattie Blacket	For service to medicine.	
Alan Bond (rescinded 1997)	For service to yachting, particularly as syndicate chairman and team captain of the successful America's Cup challenge 1983.	
Neville Thomas Bonner	For service to politics and government.	
The Reverend Professor Rolland Arthur Busch OBE	For service to religion.	
The Most Reverend Edward Bede Clancy	For service to religion.	
Dr Henry Vernon Crock	For service to medicine, particularly as an orthopaedic surgeon.	
Alexander Thomas Dix	For service to industry and the media.	
Dr Stephen Arthur FitzGerald	For service in the field of international relations.	
Charles Henry Fitzgibbon	For service to trade unionism and the transport industry.	
John Bryan Giles BEM QPM	For public service in the South Australian Police Force.	
Sydney Broadway Grange OBE MVO	For services to sport.	
Cedric Edward Keid Hampson	For service to the legal profession.	
Emeritus Professor Arthur Maxwell Horsnell	For service to dentistry.	
James Charles Ingram	For public service.	
The Honourable Charles Keith Jones	For service to politics and government.	
Colin Frederick Madigan	For service to architecture.	
Louis Joseph Mangan	For service to industry and to the community.	
The Honourable Justin Hilary O'Byrne	For service to politics and government.	
Professor William Robert Pitney	For service to medicine, particularly in the field of haematology.	
William Beal Pritchett	For public service.	
Emeritus Professor Jack Edwin Richardson	For service to the law and for public service.	
James Scully	For public service.	
Professor Donald Richard Stranks	For service to education and learning.	
Albert Lee Tucker	For service to the visual arts.	
Raymond Stanmore Turner CBE	For service to the community, particularly as national chairman of the Winston Churchill Memorial Trust.	
Emeritus Professor Frederick John Willett DSC	For service to education and learning.	
Lindsay James Yeo	For service to the community.	

==== Military Division ====
Branch	Recipient	Citation	Notes
Navy	Rear Admiral Kaye Vonthethoff	For service to the Royal Australian Navy, particularly as the Flag Officer Naval Support Command.	
Army	Major-General David Matheson Butler DSO	For service as General Officer Commanding Training Command.	
Army	Major-General David Aloysious Drabsch MBE	For service as Commander First Division.	
Army	Major-General Peter Courtney Gration OBE	For service as Assistant Chief of Defence Force Staff.	
Air Force	Air Vice-Marshal Eric Hay Stephenson OBE	For service as the Director-General of Air Force Health Services.	

=== Member of the Order of Australia (AM) ===
==== General Division ====
Recipient	Citation	Notes
Jean Marjorie Adamson	For service to early-childhood education.	
Gillian May Armstrong	For service to the film industry.	
John Edwin Bertrand	For service to yachting, particularly as helmsman of Australia II in the successful America's Cup challenge 1983.	
Arthur Ernest Bishop	For service to mechanical engineering, particularly in the field of automobile-steering technology.	
Emeritus Professor Albert Laurence Blakers	For service to secondary and tertiary education, particularly in the field of mathematics.	
Professor Aubrey Charles Bowring	For service to medicine, particularly in the field of paediatric surgery.	
Dr Doreen Miriam Bridges	For service to music education.	
Graeme Thomas Briggs	For service to sport, particularly athletics.	
Elizabeth Ann Butcher	For service to the performing arts, particularly in the field of administration.	
Leslie Caplan	For service to the community.	
Dr Desmond William Crowley	For service to adult education.	
Betty Cuthbert MBE	For service to sport and the community.	
Allen Thomas Deegan	For service to the manufacturing industry, particularly in the field of electronics.	
Dr Carmine De Pasquale	For service to ethnic welfare.	
Kathleen Mercy Dickinson	For service to the blind.	
Dr Robert Andrew Douglas	For service in the field of clinical medicine.	
Mark Gordon Ella	For service to rugby union.	
Albert Coulston Evans	For service to industrial relations.	
George Joseph Fairfax	For service to the performing arts.	
The Reverend Father Jefferies John Foale	For service to ethnic welfare.	
Michael John Francis Fox	For service to the disabled.	
Dr George Taylor Gibson	For service to medicine, particularly in the field of obstetrics and gynaecology.	
James Connal Howard Gill MBE	For service to the community.	
Stephen Charles Hall	For service to the performing arts, particularly as a producer and administrator.	
Frank Charles Beresford Haly	For service to the accountancy profession and the community.	
Brian Douglas Hannaford	For service to education.	
Norman Jones Hitchins	For public service.	
Dr David Clements Jackson DSC	For service to medicine, particularly the welfare of the disabled.	
Hilary Alison Downing Johnson	For service to the welfare of handicapped children.	
Warren Leslie Jones	For service to yachting, particularly as executive director of the successful Australia II America's Cup challenge 1983 team.	
Brian Keating DFC	For service to the community, particularly the public funding of education.	
Sister Marie Teresa Kehoe	For service to education.	
Ingeborg Victoria King	For service to the visual arts, particularly sculpture.	
Dr David Kerry Kirke	For public service in the field of paediatric nutrition.	
Gilbert Roche Andrews Langley	For service to sport and the community.	
Henry Madren Leggo	For service to the community.	
Benjamin Lexcen	For service to yachting, particularly as designer of Australia II in the successful America's Cup challenge 1983.	
Brian Edmund Lloyd	For service to engineering, particularly in the field of education.	
John Francis Longley	For service to yachting, particularly as project manager and as a crew member of Australia II in the successful America's Cup challenge 1983.	
Dr Desmond James Lugg	For public service, particularly in the field of Antarctic biomedical research.	
Joan Hartley McClintock	For service to the community in the field of social welfare.	
Professor Andrew Dalgarno McCredie	For service to music.	
John Streeter Manifold	For service to literature as a poet and musician.	
The Right Reverend Kenneth Bruce Mason	For service to religion.	
Keith Vaux Mattingley	For service to the media and the community.	
Desmond Ronald Miller	For public service in export marketing.	
James Mollison	For public service in the field of art, particularly as director of the Australian National Gallery.	
Colonel Kenneth George Mosher OBE ED	For service to science and the community.	
Cecil Thompson Oliver	For service to trade unionism.	
Patricia June O'Shane	For public service in the field of Aboriginal welfare.	
William James Bell Pollock	For public service.	
Eric Ernest Porter †	For service to the film industry, particularly in the field of animation.	
Dr Delmont Puflett (Mrs Purcell)	For service to medicine, particularly in the field of obstetrics and gynaecology.	
Joan Innes Reid	For service to the community, particularly in the field of local government, social welfare and culture.	
William Ronald John Riddel OBE	For service to the community.	
George Arthur Robinson	For service to the legal profession in the field of town planning.	
Hugh Thomson Rogers	For service to commerce, education and the community.	
Saul Same	For service to the clothing and textile industry.	
George Schaffer	For service to the building industry.	
Dr Kevin Vincent Sheridan	For public service to science, particularly in the field of radio-physics.	
George Slater	For service to trade unionism.	
Robert Duncan Somervaille	For service to commerce.	
Cecile Eunice Storey	For service to international relations and education.	
Dr Kenneth Milton Sullivan	For service to science, particularly in the field of air-pollution control.	
Harold Elvin Toft	For service to industry, particularly in the field of mechanical cane harvesting.	
Robert William Turner	For service to the community, particularly as chairman, NSW branch of the Australian Kidney Foundation.	
Vincent Anthony Warrener	For service to the performing arts.	
Marjorie Elvira West	For service to the community, particularly in the Girl Guides Association.	
Richard Bruce Wherrett	For service to the theatre as a producer and director.	
Francis Kevin Willis	For service to industrial relations.	
Eric Paul Willmot	For service to education and in the field of Aboriginal studies.	
Stanley James Wilson	For service to the community.	

==== Military Division ====
Branch	Recipient	Citation	Notes
Navy	Commander Raymond George Bragge	For service to the Supply Branch of the Royal Australian Navy.	
Navy	Captain Peter Grant Verlaine Dechaineux	For service to the Materiel Division of the Royal Australian Navy.	
Navy	Lieutenant-Commander Stephen James Dutton	For service as Commanding Officer of HMAS Kimbla.	
Navy	Commodore Philip Graham Newman Kennedy ADC	For service as the Commandant, Joint Services Staff College.	
Army	Lieutenant-Colonel Beverley Joan Blanksby ED	For service to the Army Reserve.	
Army	Colonel Robert Walter Fisher	For service to Training Command.	
Army	Lieutenant-Colonel Douglas John George	For service to Army Operational Contingency Planning and Development.	
Army	Major Ian Robert Hosie	For service as Training Officer, Headquarters Second Division.	
Army	Lieutenant-Colonel Brian Granville Le Dan	For service to Logistic Branch, Army Office.	
Army	Lieutenant-Colonel William Norman Lunn ED	For service as Military Secretary (Army Reserve), Third Military District.	
Army	Captain Keith Aubry Plummer	For service to the Melbourne and Adelaide Workshop Companies.	
Army	Major Graeme Stanley Quarry	For service as Camp Commandant, Army Office.	
Army	Colonel Barry Anthony Smithurst OStJ ED	For service as Commander, First Division Medical Services.	
Air Force	Squadron Leader Robert Irvine Baird	For service as an Equipment Officer at Base Squadron, Laverton.	
Air Force	Wing Commander William Bruce Byron	For service to the Royal Australian Air Force as a flying instructor.	
Air Force	Group Captain William Macdonald Collins	For service to the Royal Australian Air Force as an engineer officer.	
Air Force	Squadron Leader Vincent Paul Gordon	For service to the Royal Australian Air Force, particularly as resident engineer at New Zealand Aerospace Industries Ltd.	
Air Force	Wing Commander Bryan Douglas Harris	For service as Commanding Officer of No 37 Squadron.	
Air Force	Chaplain Clive Collingwood King	For service as a chaplain at RAAF Base, Richmond.	

=== Medal of the Order of Australia (OAM) ===
==== General Division ====
Recipient	Citation	Notes
Raymond Alexander Aitken	For service to conservation, particularly flora, and in the field of ornithology.	
William John Baillieu	For service to yachting, particularly as a crew member of Australia II in the successful America’s Cup Challenge 1983.	
Magda Bardy	For service to the community, particularly the welfare of ethnic aged and infirm persons.	
Barry Barker	For service to the community.	
Enid Isabel Barnes	For service to the pharmacy profession.	
Paul Henry Barnes	For service to conservation.	
Reginald Wakeham Bartels OStJ	For service to the community in the Queensland Ambulance Transport Brigade.	
Harold Henry Batterham	For service to the community.	
Colin Kenneth Beashel	For service to yachting, particularly as a crew member of Australia II in the successful America’s Cup Challenge 1983.	
Alexander Clifford Beauglehole	For service to botany, conservation and ornithology.	
Alma May Bode	For service to the angora and mohair industry.	
Joseph Meyer Brandon-Bravo	For service to the community.	
Percy Edward Brierley	For service to the welfare of ex-service personnel.	
Sylvia Hazel Brose	For service to education.	
Robert Neil Brown	For service to yachting, particularly as a crew member of Australia II in the successful America’s Cup Challenge 1983.	
Sister Mary Elizabeth Bui-Thi Nghia	For service to ethnic welfare.	
Alexander Leslie Cahill	For service to trade unionism.	
Norman Astley Calvert	For service to the sport of rifle shooting and the community.	
Anita Olive Campbell	For public service in the field of Aboriginal welfare.	
Dr Margaret Enid Christian	For service to the community, particularly in the care of animals.	
David Chugg	For service to the community.	
Florence Amy Cluff	For service to trade unionism and the welfare of the aged.	
Denis George Leonard Coley	For public service.	
Daphne Rosina Colless	For service to Aboriginal welfare.	
Kathleen Mary Cooper	For service to local government and the community.	
Dr Wilson Leighton Corlis	For service to medical education.	
Major Peter Costello	For service to yachting, particularly as a crew member of Australia II in the successful America’s Cup Challenge 1983.	
William Leslie Joseph Crofts	For service to local government and the community.	
Carmel Curtain	For service to children's welfare.	
George Harold Daldry	For service to sport and the community.	
Virginia Margaret Davey	For service to the community.	
Francis James Day	For service to sport and the community.	
David Rex Deer	For service to primary industry, particularly apiculture.	
Antonino Albert deFina	For service to the sport of skindiving.	
Donald Gatjil Djerrkura	For service to Aboriginal welfare.	
Monica Alma Duane	For service to the community.	
Russell Frank Ebert	For service to Australian football.	
Frank Brian Evans	For service to education and the community.	
Damian Michael Fewster	For service to yachting, particularly as a crew member of Australia II in the successful America’s Cup Challenge 1983.	
Jennifer Vivienne Filby	For service to the community.	
Constance Dorn Fogarty	For service to tennis.	
Roy Bennett Fothergill Galpin	For service to local government and the community.	
Richard Thomas Gard	For service in the field of mental health and to rowing.	
Leslie Arthur Gardiner	For service to podiatry.	
Raymond Arnold Graetz MC	For service to the community.	
Norman Mervyn Green	For service to primary industry and local government.	
James Edward Greening	For service to the community.	
John Vincent Groves	For service to the community, particularly junior sport.	
Dorothea Hildegard Johanna Hamilton	For service to nursing.	
George Godfrey Hard	For service to the community, particularly with the Prisoners' Aid Society.	
Betty Mildred Harding	For service to the community.	
Kenneth Edgar Haslingden	For service to local government and the community.	
Edward Bonaventure Heffernan	For service to the visual arts.	
Sister Mary Vianney Henry	For service to the community, particularly the welfare of orphaned children.	
Geoffrey Payne Hodge	For public service.	
Frances Honour Hogan	For service to the community.	
Thomas William Holmes	For service to the welfare of ex-service personnel.	
Thelma May Hoy	For service to the community.	
Stanley Edward Hummerston	For service to the community.	
Allan Marcus Huston	For service to the community.	
James James	For service to the community.	
Kenneth Peter Judge	For service to yachting, particularly as a crew member of Australia II in the successful America’s Cup Challenge 1983.	
Johnny Kalisperis	For service to ethnic welfare.	
John Charles Carew LaForest	For service to the newsagency industry.	
Alfred Harrington Langdon	For service to the manufacturing industry.	
Anita Josephine Mary Le Tessier	For service to education in the field of speech and drama.	
Lynley Jean Lewis	For service to the country community, particularly the teaching of ballet to children.	
Cole Michael Lissiman	For service to yachting, particularly as a crew member of Australia II in the successful America’s Cup Challenge 1983.	
Robert Campbell Llewellyn	For service to the community.	
Ernest Lone	For public service.	
Rolfe Scott McAllister	For service to yachting, particularly as a crew member of Australia II in the successful America’s Cup Challenge 1983.	
Patrick Joseph McCormack	For public service.	
Arnold Robert McGill	For service to ornithology.	
The Reverend Dr Colin Anthony McKay	For service to the community, particularly in the field of psychiatric care.	
William Patrick McNamara	For service to the building industry and the community.	
Ronald Charles MacKenzie	For service to the sport of freshwater fishing.	
Joan MacLean	For service to the community.	
William Forrester Fisher MacLennan	For service to the community.	
Theresa Delores Maunder	For service to ballet.	
Maria Irena Mencinsky	For service to ethnic welfare.	
Patricia June Moore	For service to basketball.	
Colin Thomas Nicholas	For service to cricket.	
Jacqueline Moya O'Brien	For service to nursing.	
Bert Oliver	For service to yachting.	
Mary Roberta Owen	For service to the community, particularly in the field of women's affairs.	
Neville George Perkins	For service to Aboriginal welfare.	
Rosemary Ann Pirie	For service to the community.	
Irene Gwendoline Ramsay	For service to the community.	
George Rawnsley	For service to Aboriginal welfare.	
Brian John Richardson	For service to yachting, particularly as a crew member of Australia II in the successful America’s Cup Challenge 1983.	
Stanley Stuart Roberts	For service to the community.	
Father Peter James Robinson	For service to the welfare of the disabled.	
Major Arthur Frederick William Shaw RL	For service to the community.	
Grant Eugene Simmer	For service to yachting, particularly as a crew member of Australia II in the successful America’s Cup Challenge 1983.	
Phillip Murray Smidmore	For service to yachting, particularly as a crew member of Australia II in the successful America’s Cup Challenge 1983.	
Mary Clare Smith	For public service.	
Rosemary Joy Stacy	For service to the Girl Guides Association.	
Florence Winifred Stalley	For service to the community.	
James Francis Stephens	For service to the welfare of ex-service personnel.	
James Ronald Stoner	For service to the community.	
Leon George Stubbings	For service with the Australian Red Cross Society.	
Andrzej Szczygielski	For service to ethnic welfare and the welfare of ex-service personnel.	
Joan Margaret Taggart	For service to the community.	
Hugh Keith Treharne	For service to yachting, particularly as a crew member of Australia II in the successful America’s Cup Challenge 1983.	
Gina Florence Triaca	For service to ethnic welfare.	
Harold Elliot Twartz	For service to the community.	
Edward Leo Twohill	For service with the Pony Club Association.	
Wagea Waia	For service to Aboriginal welfare.	
Eileen May Walker	For service to the community.	
Thomas James Wallace	For service to the community.	
Stanley Ward	For service to the community, particularly the welfare of alcoholics.	
Ivy May West	For service to nursing.	
William Raymond Wilkie	For public service.	
Charles Henry Wilson	For service to the community and the life-insurance industry.	
Garnet Ian Wilson	For service to Aboriginal welfare.	
Reginald Wilson-Irving	For service to the entertainment industry and the community.	
Florence Edith Wrighter BEM	For service to athletics.	
Albert Ernest Clifford Young	For long-distance running.	

==== Military Division ====
Branch	Recipient	Citation	Notes
Navy	Chief Petty Officer John William Balcolm	For service to the Communications Centre of HMAS Moreton and Naval Communications Area Local Station, Brisbane.	
Navy	Chief Petty Officer Peter Mintern Brown	For service to the RAN Reserve, particularly to Diving Team 6.	
Navy	Able Seaman Ian Robert Duffner	For service as a seaman in the Royal Australian Navy.	
Navy	Chief Petty Officer Derek Brian Hampson	For service as Deputy Marine Engineer Officer of HMAS Moresby.	
Navy	Chief Petty Officer Raymond James Tweedie	For service as the senior sailor in charge of the stores department of HMAS Cairns.	
Navy	Warrant Officer Eric Thomas Watson	For service as the Supply Officer (Catering) in HMAS Nirimba.	
Army	Sergeant Eric John Bardsley	For service as Supervisor Army Messes, Joint Services Staff College.	
Army	Warrant Officer Class Two Geoffrey Reginald Bateman	For service as a Regimental Quartermaster Sergeant, District-Support, Unit, Sydney.	
Army	Warrant Officer Class One Ronald Alexander Coleman	For service in the field of training, particularly as Regimental Sergeant Major, Training Command.	
Army	Warrant Officer Class Two Stephen Leitch Collins	For service in the field of contact repair and maintenance of Army equipment.	
Army	Captain Kevin John Dunnicliffe	For service as a Regimental Quartermaster Sergeant in the 5th/7th Battalion, Royal Australian Regiment.	
Army	Sergeant Alan William Forte	For service as the Physical Training Instructor, 1st Military Hospital.	
Army	Warrant Officer Class One Douglas John Gammon	For service in training Army apprentices at 1st Base Workshop Battalion.	
Army	Captain Barry Alwyn John Hassall	For service as the Regimental Sergeant Major, Officer Cadet School.	
Army	Corporal Eric John Leask	For service as driver for the General Officer Commanding Logistic Command.	
Army	Sergeant Brian Edward Medcraft	For service to the Army Malaria Research Unit.	
Army	Sergeant Keith Richardson O'Connor	For service as Gunnery Instructor, Armoured Centre.	
Army	Warrant Officer Class One Graham Maxwell O'Hearn	For service in the field of armoured-vehicle technical support, particularly with 3rd/4th Cavalry Regiment.	
Army	Captain Lindsay Ross Pyne	For services as Senior Nursing Officer, Army Apprentices School.	
Army	Warrant Officer Class One Trevor Albert Robson	For service as the Movements Officer, Liverpool Transport Unit.	
Army	Warrant Officer Class One Ola Sever Stevenson	For service in the field of parachute and Army Reserve Special Action Force training.	
Army	Warrant Officer Class One Frederick John Titcume	For service as Unit Administrative Officer, 1st Port Construction and Repair Group.	
Air Force	Warrant Officer John Gilbert Chalmers	For service as a warrant officer engineer in the Royal Australian Air Force.	
Air Force	Warrant Officer Graham David Copeland	For service as a caterer at RAAF Base, East Sale.	
Air Force	Sergeant David Ross Cussons	For service to the RAAF as an aircraft metal worker.	
Air Force	Sergeant Joseph Paul Kozey	For service search and rescue crewman, No 2 Flying Training School, RAAF.	
Air Force	Flight Sergeant Norman Vincent Meechan	For service as a security guard at No 1 Stores Depot RAAF	
Air Force	Sergeant Howard Vernon MiSSa't	For service to the Royal Australian Air Force as a photographer.	
Air Force	Flight Sergeant Harry William Park	For service to the Royal Australian Air Force as a blacksmith.	
Air Force	Warrant Officer Donald James Stanley Smith	For service as a motor-transport driver at Base Squadron, RAAF Base, Richmond.	
