= Steve Conway (singer) =

English singer (1920–1952)

- Also known as: Gordon James
- Born: Walter James Groom; 12 October 1920; Bethnal Green, London, England
- Died: 19 April 1952 (aged 31) Southwark, London, England
- Genres: Vocal; traditional pop; sentimental ballad
- Instruments: Vocals
- Years active: 1943–1951
- Label: Columbia

Steve Conway (born Walter James Groom; 12 October 1920 – 19 April 1952) was a British singer who rose to fame in the 1940s, in the period following the end of the Second World War. Known for romantic ballads, he made dozens of recordings for EMI's Columbia label, appeared regularly on BBC Radio and toured the UK, before his career was cut short by his early death, aged 31, resulting from a heart condition. He has been described as "Britain's first post-war male heart-throb, a masculine equivalent of Vera Lynn in his sincerity and clear diction."

== Early life ==
Steve Conway was the eldest of five children born to Walter James Groom, a labourer, and Florence Groom (née Maddams) in Bethnal Green in east London, in 1920. He was baptised with the same name as his father, but known as Jimmy to friends and relatives. Groom's family were poor, and their annual holiday was to go hop picking in Kent every summer. The family experienced loss whilst Groom was still young: his twin brothers did not survive infancy, while his sister died at the age of five from meningitis. Groom himself suffered with rheumatic fever when he was five years old.

Upon leaving school aged 14, Groom undertook poorly-paid manual work, initially making deliveries on a tricycle for an embroidery firm. He then worked at a shoe factory as a machinist, where his habit of singing on the shop floor made him unpopular with the foreman. Following an argument over this, Groom was sacked when he punched the foreman. Groom also worked as a porter at Billingsgate Fish Market.

Whilst still a teenager, a turning point in Groom's life came when he met Lilian Butcher, a local East End girl who worked in a textile factory near where he was living. It has been said that Butcher "was the woman who inspired profound devotion in him and infused his singing with such romantic power." During World War II, Butcher worked in a munitions factory; when Groom attempted to enlist in the Royal Navy, he was declared unfit for service, owing to a heart condition which had developed from his earlier rheumatic fever, and damaged his coronary valves. He was not told to seek treatment, and continued working.

== Performing career ==
=== From amateur to professional ===
Groom had always enjoyed singing, but never sang in a school or church choir, and received no formal musical training. However, his ear for music meant that he was able to repeat the notes of a tune perfectly after just one listen, and could hum the whole score of a musical after seeing it for the first time. Described as a "modest, unassuming man", it was only under pressure from his then-girlfriend Lilian that he began to enter amateur talent contests. Groom was persuaded to enter such a contest at a Bethnal Green cinema when he was 16, where he won the first prize of a biscuit barrel. He entered further talent contests between 1936 and 1938, and in the Second World War, he got bookings for stage appearances around London; these were primarily amateur shows performed between films at cinemas.

Groom's first paid performance was at the Trocadero in Commercial Road, east London. In 1943, he appeared in a Sunday afternoon show at the Gaumont State Theatre in Kilburn, north London. This in turn led to a fortnight at the Trocadero cinema in Elephant and Castle, south London, where he was invited to return twice. In January 1944, he made his third return visit to the Trocadero, where he was heard singing by the artistes' manager Reg Morgan. With comedian Charlie Chester, Morgan ran the Victory Music Publishing Company. Both thought that Groom had star potential, and persuaded him to audition for the BBC.

The BBC talent scout and producer Cecil Madden put Groom into an edition of the BBC General Forces Programme show Variety Bandbox, in which Groom made his first radio broadcast on 23 January 1945, billed as Gordon James, a name he was using at the time. Groom appeared with Reg Morgan in a "Meet the Composer" section of the show.

Groom, at the time employed by the brewers Mann, Crossman and Pullin, where he cleaned out the vats, was told by Morgan that he would never get anywhere in showbusiness whilst he remained working full-time there. Morgan offered Groom a contract for £6 a week if he left the brewery; Groom accepted, and gave in his notice.

Morgan set about making Groom a star, which initially involved changing his voice and name. As a native of the East End of London, Groom had a strong Cockney accent, and took elocution lessons with Chloe Gibson to alter this. Upon the advice of Charlie Chester, Groom changed his stage name to Steve Conway. On 12 April 1945, Conway made his first BBC broadcast under his new name for Navy Mixture, a radio show on the General Forces Programme, in a segment entitled 'Million-Airs', in which he introduced songs which had sold a million.

=== Fame ===
As a relatively inexperienced stage performer, Conway toured Mecca dance halls, and in late 1945, sang with the well-known bandleader Ambrose at Ciro's nightclub in London's West End. Whilst Conway was there, Princess Marina, the Duchess of Kent visited the club and asked him to sing "Laura". He also sang with bands led by such notable names as Joe Loss, Lew Stone and Maurice Winnick. The Melody Maker magazine's poll results in the male vocalist section for 1945 showed Conway at No. 13, ahead of other established names.

Following the end of the war that year, Conway made his recording debut for EMI's Columbia Records, with whom he signed a contract. At the Abbey Road Studios, aged 24, he sang "The Gypsy" and "I Could Never Tell", which were released on a single in November that year.

Conway continued to make radio appearances, featuring in I'll Play To You and Sleepy Serenade with the organist Sandy MacPherson. With MacPherson, Conway also had his own series, Steve Conway in Romantic Mood, and he appeared in broadcasts with the bandleaders Ted Heath and Billy Ternent. A notable radio success for Conway was in Sweet Serenade, a Sunday afternoon series with Peter Yorke and his Concert Orchestra, for which Conway had become "the vocal mainstay" by January 1948. The number of women burning their Sunday lunches due to their being distracted by Conway on the radio was remarked upon by one commentator.

In February 1948, Conway began a major tour of variety theatres, where he would be accompanied by guitarist Bert Weedon. By now, Conway was topping the bill, and receiving a large amount of fan mail, which he would spend a day a week answering. During this period, he was earning £200 a week (equivalent to £6,290 in 2025), subsequently rising to £300 (equivalent to £9,430 in 2025). In December that year, Conway made his BBC Television debut in the variety show Melody and Mirth, and went on to make further television appearances. However, radio was still the most important medium of the era, and Conway had made over 200 broadcasts by the end of 1949.

=== Recording career ===
In September 1951, Conway's "At the End of the Day", featuring the Hastings Girls Choir, was released; the recording was used by Radio Luxembourg to sign off their evening broadcasts for over 30 years. In all, Conway recorded nearly 100 titles, and worked with the up-and-coming producer Norman Newell, achieving success with Newell's own song "My Thanks To You". Although the UK Singles Chart was not compiled and published until November 1952, after Conway's recording career had ended, research published in 2013 has shown that 23 of his 78s would have sold enough to register on a Top 30 chart. His biggest-selling titles are reported to have been "I Can't Begin to Tell You" and "Good Luck, Good Health, God Bless You" (the latter with the Hastings Girls Choir), both of which would have been placed at No. 3 in the weekly charts.

The only contemporary music charts published in Britain during Conway's career compiled sales of sheet music. Many of the songs which featured in this chart were recorded by Conway at the time of their success, including "April Showers", "I'll Make Up For Everything", "When You Were Sweet Sixteen", "The Wedding of Lilli Marlene", "My Foolish Heart", "Daddy's Little Girl", "Mona Lisa" (with The Stargazers), "A Dream is a Wish Your Heart Makes", "Autumn Leaves" and "Too Young". Conway was also the only British artist to record "Time After Time" when it was new; the song has since become a jazz standard.

Other well-known songs recorded by Conway included "Bless This House" and "Look for the Silver Lining". In the studio, he was accompanied by Roberto Inglez, Peter Yorke, Jack Byfield, Arthur Young, Jackie Brown and Philip Green. In addition to being backed by Yorke, Conway was also the featured vocalist on several recordings issued under Yorke's name. Conway's final recordings were made on 6 October 1951, accompanied by Ray Martin and His Orchestra. Issued in December 1951, these were "With All My Heart and Soul" and "Chez Moi", the latter title featuring music composed by Paul Misraki.

=== Appraisal ===
Described as "a ballad singer with a smooth, straightforward delivery", Conway's voice drew comparisons with the late Al Bowlly, who had died in 1941. Lew Stone, for whose band Bowlly had been a singer, considered employing Conway if he had reformed his dance band after the war. Contemporary reviews made the comparison to Bowlly, but Conway's wife claimed that neither she or her husband had heard of Bowlly until Conway received a fan letter stating "you must be Al Bowlly's ghost". Memory Lane magazine later wrote of Conway, "His mellow voice had a wonderful and effortless range. His smooth yet thrilling voice was warm, rich and relaxed with perfect pitch and depth."

Also labelled "Britain's answer to Bing Crosby", Conway attracted celebrity fans: playwright Noël Coward said that Conway was his favourite singer, whilst his American contemporaries Doris Day and Bob Hope were admirers. Conway wanted to record swing numbers, but he stuck to the theme of romantic yearning at the behest of his management.

== Personal life, illness and death ==
Conway married Lilian Butcher at Christ Church in Hackney on 12 April 1941, and in February 1944, they had a daughter, Janice. Steve and Lilian's first home was a house in Hackney; it was only when persuaded by his manager that Conway moved the family from their cramped home to a detached house in Ickenham, Middlesex in December 1950. Described as "unassuming, friendly and generous", Conway was reportedly "astonished" by his fame, and would say "I'm only a singer". In spite of his achievements, his personality did not change. "When he got back from a recording session, he would often play football with the kids in the street. His best friend was the milkman", said Conway's daughter Janice.

=== Illness ===
By 1950, his health problems were becoming apparent. That year, whilst on a River Thames boat trip with friends and family, Conway's boat ran into a strong current, and he struggled getting it to safety, which put a strain on his heart, leaving him "exhausted". Over the next few days, he remained tired and unwell. Following this, he continued to perform and record, but his health began to deteriorate. "From that day, he was never the same," Lilian later recalled.

Whilst on stage at the Bradford Alhambra in May 1951, Conway collapsed, but recovered, and carried on working, although with a deterioration in his condition, and his theatre appearances would occasionally be cancelled at short notice. In December that year, Conway collapsed on stage at the Hull Palace and was admitted to Hull Royal Infirmary. His theatre dates were cancelled, and after being discharged from the hospital, he was sent home to London by train. At King's Cross station, he was met by an ambulance, who took him back home on a stretcher.

Conway consulted a Harley Street specialist, Sir Russell Brock, who was King George VI's surgeon. Brock said that Conway's rheumatic fever from childhood had not been treated properly. This caused mitral stenosis, an abnormal narrowing of the mitral valve in the heart. Conway became too ill to stay at home, and after Christmas 1951, arrangements were made for his admission to Charing Cross Hospital. Surgery to try to repair Conway's heart valves was recommended by Brock. Although a standard procedure today, it was a risky operation in the early 1950s, something Lilian was warned of.

The operation gave Conway a 50-50 chance of a cure, and he was transferred to Guy's Hospital for surgery. The news that he was there caused fans to besiege the hospital. The day before his operation, Conway was visited by producer Norman Newell and orchestra leader Ray Martin from his record label, Columbia; he laughed and joked with them, and talked of new gimmicks for the records he would make again soon.

=== Death and funeral ===
On 10 April 1952, Conway was operated on. He came round after the anaesthetic, and was visited by Lilian, but Conway suffered with post-operative complications, and died at Guy's Hospital in London on 19 April 1952, aged 31. Following his death, it was revealed that as Conway hated to disappoint an audience or break a contract, for the last few weeks of his final tour, he was spending 20 out of 24 hours a day in bed, arriving at the theatre just in time for his performance.

Conway's death was widely reported in both the musical and national press. On Friday 25 April at 2.30pm, he was cremated at Golders Green Crematorium, with a congregation of around 100, including "bandleaders, vocalists, musicians, recording executives, music publishers, song writers, artistes, agents, managers and reporters", Melody Maker reporter Chris Hayes later remembered. "There were about 75 floral tributes", Hayes added, noting that they ranged "from simple little bouquets from fans, to elaborate wreathes from wealthy stars. The most touching came from his heartbroken daughter and was in the shape of a miniature chair inscribed Daddy's Little Girl, a poignant memory of his hit song." At the time of his death, Conway's daughter Janice was eight years old.

== Legacy ==
Several years after Conway's death, his producer, Norman Newell, renamed the then unknown pianist Trevor Stanford as Russ Conway in tribute to Steve ('Russ' was taken from the Russ Henderson Steel Band). Under this name, Russ Conway achieved considerable success in the 1950s and 60s.

Since the early 1960s, there have been a number of Steve Conway LP and CD compilation albums issued collecting his recordings. These have continued to be released into the 2010s.
