= A Son Is Born =

- Lobby card
- Directed by: Eric Porter
- Written by: Gloria Bourner
- Produced by: Eric Porter
- Starring: Ron Randell; Peter Finch; Muriel Steinbeck
- Cinematography: Arthur Higgins; Damien Parer (war photography)
- Edited by: James Pearson
- Music by: Sydney John Kay
- Production company: Eric Porter Studios
- Distributed by: British Empire Films (UK); Hoyts (AS); 20th Century Fox (US/International)
- Release date: 20 September 1946
- Running time: 85 mins
- Country: Australia
- Language: English
- Budget: £10,000
- Box office: £30,000

A Son Is Born is a 1946 Australian melodrama directed by Eric Porter and starring Ron Randell, Peter Finch, John McCallum and Muriel Steinbeck. It was one of the few films made in Australia in the 1940s. Filmink called it modestly budgeted and scheduled, unpretentious movie made with skill that showcased some exciting stars, deployed a common genre with a strongly Australian setting, found an appreciative audience, and made a profit. It offered a perhaps more realistic financial model for local filmmakers than The Overlanders or Smithy', two other films that came out the same year.

The movie is particularly notable for featuring Randell, Finch and McCallum before they moved overseas and became stars in the United States and Britain respectively.

== Synopsis ==
In 1920, Laurette marries an irresponsible drifter, Paul Graham. They have a son, David, but later divorce due to Paul's drinking and infidelities when David is thirteen. David chooses to stay with his father and Laurette marries again, this time to John, a rich businessman with a teenaged daughter, Kay.

Years later, Paul is killed in a car accident and David comes to live with his mother, John and Kay. To get revenge on his mother for "abandoning" his father, David seduces Kay into marriage and abandons her, but realises the error of his ways serving in New Guinea during World War II. He is injured in battle but survives to be reunited with Kay, Laurette and John.

== Cast ==
- Muriel Steinbeck as Laurette Graham
- Ron Randell as David Graham
- Peter Finch as Paul Graham
- John McCallum as John Seldon
- Jane Holland as Kay Seldon
- Kitty Bluett as Phyllis
- Peter Dunstan as David Graham as a boy

== Production ==
=== Development ===
Eric Porter was a cartoonist and ran his own studio. Gloria Bourner was one of his employees. Bourner wrote the script and Porter storyboarded the entire film prior to filming, which was announced in September 1944.

Porter put up half the budget himself, with the balance coming from Charles Munro and some private investors. The budget was a reported £10,000.

=== Casting ===
Peter Finch, Ron Randell, Muriel Steinbeck and John McCallum were all well established actors when the film was made.

Jane Holland was a 22-year-old radio actor who later moved to England and married Leo McKern.

Kitty Bluett was a musical comedy star, the daughter of comedian Fred Bluett.

=== Shooting ===
The film was shot in the Supreme Sound System studio in late 1944. This was a small one-room studio based in North Sydney.

Filming was scheduled to allow the actors to take radio and stage jobs, and sometimes would start at midnight.

War footage shot by Damien Parer is used in the New Guinea sequences.

The pool and garden scenes were filmed at Meadow Lea house in Sydney.

== Release ==
The movie was shot prior to Smithy (1946), also starring Randell and Steinbeck, but its release was held off until after that bigger budget movie to take advantage of its publicity.

Ron Randell was mobbed by female fans at the film's premiere.

In July 1946 Ealing Studios - who had made The Overlanders in Australia, and who had signed John McCallum to a long-term contract - bought the film for release in Britain.

== Reception ==
=== Critical ===
Critical response was mixed, many comparing the film unfavourably with Smithy.

Reviewer Stephen Vagg later wrote in Filmink that "this is a perfectly fine soapie, with Steinbeck suffering and smiling through the tears. She has beauty and charisma and holds her own against three men who would all become major names." Vagg characterised Randell's performance as "charismatic, vicious, cruel... a great performance... [that] established Randell as a force to watch."

=== Box office ===
Eric Porter later claimed the film at a six week run at the Victory Theatre in Sydney and that it made £27,000 at the Australian box office and £3,000 at the British box office. He also said that he sold it to television in America, Europe and Britain but he had trouble selling it to Australian television.

== Storm Hill ==
In September 1946 Porter announced he would make another feature, Storm Hill, based on a script by Bourner and Richard Lane, starring Peter Finch, with Ron Randell as assistant director. However the movie was never made.
