= Vic Hall (novelist) =

Australian novelist and biographer

Vic Hall (10 March 1896 – 11 February 1972) was an Australian novelist and biographer.

== Early career ==
Victor Charles Hall was born and educated in London, England. War broke out during his studies as an art student and he joined the British Army in 1914 and served in France until the end of the First World War. He was wounded five times and awarded the Military Medal. He arrived in Western Australia in 1920, where he worked as a farm hand and jackaroo, before sailing in a pearling lugger. In 1924, he joined the Northern Territory Mounted Police, in which he served until 1942, when he joined the Australian Army, serving in the Territory until 1945. He was wounded in the eye during the first Darwin air raid, and this brought on total blindness in 1954. However, he learned to use a typewriter and continued to publish stories and books.

== Writing career ==
Vic Hall's first book, Bad Medicine, published in 1947, tells the tale of a manhunt for an Aboriginal killer in the Northern Territory. Based on his own experience as a policeman, it takes a sensitive but unbiased look at black/white relations at the same time as telling a dramatic story. Against the background of the Caledon Bay crisis, Dreamtime Justice recounts the story of the hunt for the killers of an N.T. Mounted Policeman, Constable Albert Stewart McColl. Hall was one of the four policemen who set off in search of the killers, in company with black trackers. He went on to write biographies of Aboriginal artist Albert Namatjira and A.I.M. nurse Ruth Heathcock.

== Works ==
- Hall, Vic (1947). Bad Medicine. Robertson & Mullens, Melbourne.
- Hall, Vic (1962). Dreamtime Justice. Rigby Limited, Adelaide.
- Hall, Vic (1962). Namatjira of the Aranda. Rigby Limited, Adelaide.
- Hall, Vic (1968). Sister Ruth. Neville Spearman, London.
- Hall, Vic (1969). Reminiscences of Victor Hall. unpublished, diary notes held at the State Library of South Australia.
- Hall, Vic (1970). Outback Policeman. Rigby Limited, Adelaide.

== Artistic career ==
Vic Hall was an accomplished artist whose career was cut short by the loss of his sight in 1954. Several of his paintings are owned by the Northern Territory Museum of Arts and Sciences. His last painting, "Police Patrol," was featured on the cover of the police journal Citation in June 1966.

== Last days ==
Vic Hall married twice and survived both of his wives, with whom he had no issue. He died in 1972.
