= Donald Peers =

Welsh singer (1908–1973)

Background information
- Born: Donald Rhys Hubert Peers; 10 July 1908; Ammanford, Wales
- Died: 9 August 1973 (aged 65) Hove, England
- Genre: Traditional pop
- Occupation: Singer

Donald Rhys Hubert Peers (10 July 1908 – 9 August 1973) was a Welsh singer of traditional pop. His best remembered rendition and signature song was "In a Shady Nook by a Babbling Brook".

== Biography ==
=== Early life ===
Donald Peers was born in the Welsh mining town of Ammanford, Carmarthenshire, on 10 July 1908. His father, a colliery worker and prominent member of the Plymouth Brethren, disapproved of variety theatre, and never heard or saw his son perform. Peers' family was hoping he would become a schoolteacher, but he had other ambitions and left home at the age of sixteen.

Peers travelled around the country working as a house painter and, for a time in January to March 1927, went to sea as a mess steward on ships. In September 1927, he decided to enter show business and he made his debut in a concert party called "Tons of Fun" at the New Theatre in Lowestoft. He continued with the touring company in a show called "Comedy Concoctions – on Tour" for a few weeks until it disbanded. He auditioned for the BBC and his first BBC Radio broadcast on 2LO took place on 17 December 1927, with the London Radio Dance Band. One of the songs he sang was, "In a Shady Nook by a Babbling Brook", which became his most requested song and, later, his signature tune.

=== Career ===
Peers made several more radio broadcasts and these led to he touring the variety stages in a concert party called "Pleasure", where he accompanied himself on ukulele and also gave ukulele solos. He was engaged to appear in the "Babes in the Wood" pantomime at the Grand, Plymouth, in December 1928. Following that, he went into a touring revue called "Spare Time" and received very good notices.

His London debut took place in a revue at the Bedford Theatre in 1929. December 1929 found him back at the Grand, Plymouth, where he starred in the pantomime "Cinderella" playing Dandini and then he toured in a revue called "Laugh, Hang It, Laugh". The latter half of 1930 was spent touring with another revue called " A Vaudeville Voyage", when he was described as a light comedian.

In May 1926, he met Gertrude Mary Thomson in Richmond, North Riding of Yorkshire, they eventually married on 7 June 1930 in Harrogate. Their daughter, Sheila, was born on 25 April 1931.

Peers continued to tour with revues and with appearances on the variety stage, and from February 1932, he was being billed as "The Laughing Cavalier of Song". In November and December 1932, he took part in two experimental television broadcasts, in which he played banjo solos. In 1933, after an appearance on the BBC Music Hall programme booked as The Laughing Cavalier of Song, he got a recording contract with His Master's Voice. He soon moved to Eclipse Records, who sold through Woolworths on 8" records, and made a number of recordings for them during 1934 and 1935.

In 1940, Peers enlisted in the Royal Army Service Corps as a clerk, serving until D-Day in 1944, when he was invalided out. While in service, he entertained his fellow troops in shows. He continued to make recordings for Decca during the war and in 1944, he recorded "In a Shady Nook by a Babbling Brook", written by E. G. Nelson and Harry Pease in 1927.

Peers began a new radio series for the BBC's Light Programme on 5 August 1947 and this was very successful over the next two years. It resulted in a string of hit records in the late 1940s, with recordings such "I Can't Begin To Tell You", "Bow Bells", "Far Away Places", "On The 5.45" (a vocal version of "Twelfth Street Rag", with lyrics by Andy Razaf), "Powder Your Face With Sunshine" (one of his biggest successes), "Lavender Blue (Dilly Dilly)", "A Strawberry Moon (In A Blueberry Sky)", "Everywhere You Go", "Clancy Lowered the Boom", "It Happened in Adano", "A Rose in a Garden of Weeds", "I'll String Along with You" and "Down in the Glen".

His popularity was such that on 9 May 1949, he performed his two-hour one-man show at the Royal Albert Hall in front of an enthusiastic audience of 8692. Henry Hall booked him with Billy Russell and Norman Wisdom for a new show called Buttons & Bows which opened for a summer season at the Grand in Blackpool on 20 June 1949. Unfortunately, Peers had to withdraw from the show at the end of August 1949 due to throat trouble. This led to a throat operation and he was unable to sing for six months. He recovered to headline the London Palladium in August 1950 and he appeared in the Royal Variety Performance. on 13 November that year.

Peers continued recording songs such as "The Last Mile Home", "Dear Hearts and Gentle People", "Out of a Clear Blue Sky", "Music! Music! Music!", "If I Knew You Were Comin' I'd've Baked a Cake", "Enjoy Yourself (It's Later Than You Think)", "Dearie", "I Remember the Cornfields", "Beloved, Be Faithful", "Me and My Imagination", "Mistakes", "In a Golden Coach" (a celebratory number for the Coronation of Queen Elizabeth II), "Is It Any Wonder" and "Changing Partners".

Peers found a favourable audience in Australia. In 1950 alone, he placed the following 12 songs into Australia's Top 20: "Music! Music! Music! (Put Another Nickel In)", "I Told Them All About You", "(If I Knew You Were Comin') I'd've Baked a Cake", "Harry Lime Theme", "Twenty Four Hours of Sunshine", "Dearie", "Tennessee Waltz", "Enjoy Yourself (It's Later Than You Think)", "Oh, You Sweet One", "Rolling 'Round the World", "My Golden Baby", and "Daddy's Little Girl".

On 31 May 1954, he travelled to Australia to tour and remained there for 2½ years. His wife and daughter did not accompany him and on his return in 1956, he announced that he was seeking a divorce. There was a maintenance dispute that was the subject of a legal battle, but his wife would not agree to a divorce, as she was a Roman Catholic. His long-term partner became Kay O'Dwyer, who managed his affairs and had accompanied him to Australia.

During his absence in Australia, Peers’ fans had forgotten about him and the pop music scene had changed dramatically with the arrival of rock 'n' roll. He returned to TV and radio work, but eventually found work via the club circuit, which had taken over from variety theatres. In May 1962, Peers was given his own BBC Wales television programme, Donald Peers Presents, playing boogie piano, and during the series, he introduced Tom Jones, and scientist and writer Brian J. Ford.

Peers kept busy with many guest appearances on TV shows and in February 1964, he became the compere of BBC TV's new "Club Night" programme, a 40-minute show televised from provincial social clubs with new and well-known entertainers. The show was very successful and he made 18 appearances over the next year or so. Shows for the BBC Light Programme and for BBC2 followed.

Peers made a comeback to the record charts with "Please Don't Go" (a ballad set to the tune of Offenbach's "Barcarolle" from The Tales of Hoffmann), which reached No. 3 in the UK Singles Chart in 1969. He made several appearances on BBC-TV's Top of the Pops in February 1969 to promote his recording—Eddy Arnold had pop and country success with his cover version. This was followed by a string of singles and albums by Peers, but it was not until 1972 that he had another minor hit with "Give Me One More Chance", which reached the UK Top 40.

In 1971, Peers suffered a serious accident while in Australia when he fell and broke his back. Recovery took a long time and for a while, he used a wheelchair.

== Films ==
He appeared in a couple of films.

The Balloon Goes Up (1942). Balloon unit WAAFs catch German spies. Peers played "Sergeant Jim" and sang "You've Gotta Smile". "I'll Soon Be Coming Home" and "Keep Looking for the Rainbow".

Sing Along with Me (1952). He played David Parry, a humble grocer who wins a radio song-writing contest. Peers sang "Take My Heart", "If You Smile at the Sun", "Hoop Diddle-i-do-ra-li-ay", "Down at the Old Village Hall" and "I Left My Heart in a Valley in Wales". The review in Kinematograph Weekly stated "The picture presents Donald Peers with a simple yet effective vehicle for his screen debut, and he returns the compliment by easily adapting his flawless stage, radio and TV technique to the even more exacting demands of the "flicks." His friendly approach offsets his years, close-ups hold no terror for him, and, like the experienced trouper he is, he sees that all the ditties have rousing choruses."

== Later life ==
Peers died from bronchial pneumonia in a Hove nursing home on 9 August 1973 at the age of 65, with The Brighton & Hove Gazette and Herald announcing his demise. He was cremated in the Downs Crematorium, Brighton. His memorial tablet in the Garden of Remembrance, now weather-beaten, reads, 'Donald Peers, August 1973, Loved by Kates, "In a Shady Nook by a Babbling Brook"'.

== Miscellaneous ==
In 1950 Peers knocked down and killed an elderly man in a road accident in Marylebone, London. He was cleared of any blame.

A keen golfer, Peers played in the British Amateur Championship at St. Andrews on 22 May 1950 but lost in the first round.

Peers's autobiography, titled Pathway, was published in 1951.

In 1954, Peers was sued by his former pianist Ernest John Ponticelli for arrears of salary of £490 and ultimately was required to pay him just £200.

== Discography ==
=== Singles ===
Title	Year	Peak chart positions		Label
Title	Year	UK	AUS	Label
"Don't Blame Me" b/w "Sundown in a Little Green Hollow"	1933	—	—	His Master's Voice
"The Old Covered Bridge" b/w "In the Valley Where the Pine Trees Grow"	1934	—	—	Eclipse
"Little Man, You've Had a Busy Day" b/w "Humming Your Glum Times Away"	1934	—	—	Eclipse
"The Man on the Flying Trapeze – Part 1" b/w "The Man on the Flying Trapeze – Part 2"	1934	—	—	Eclipse
"Remember Me" b/w "Friends"	1934	—	—	Eclipse
"I'll String Along with You" b/w "If I Couldn't Have You"	1934	—	—	Eclipse
"Stay As Sweet As You Are" b/w "Since I Met You"	1935	—	—	Eclipse
"Lady, Sing Your Gypsy Song" b/w "After the Sun's Kissed the World Good-Bye"	1935	—	—	Eclipse
"Cheek to Cheek" b/w "I'm Singing in My Sleep"	1935	—	—	Crown
"Take Me Back to My Boots and Saddle" b/w "Do They Miss Me at Home"	1936	—	—	Crown
"Lights Out" b/w "Lonely Little Vagabond"	1936	—	—	Crown
"Life Begins When You're in Love" b/w "I'm in Love with You"	1936	—	—	Crown
"When I'm with You" b/w "Too Many Friends – Too Many Kisses"	1936	—	—	Crown
"The Adventures of Rusty and Dusty – Part One" b/w "The Adventures of Rusty and Dusty – Part Two"	1937	—	—	Crown
"Pennies from Heaven" b/w "One-Way Street"	1937	—	—	Crown
"Amapola" b/w "There Goes That Song Again"	1941	—	—	Decca
"When They Sound the Last "All Clear"" b/w "Dolores"	1941	—	—	Decca
"Hey! Little Hen" b/w "Forever and a Day"	1941	—	—	Decca
"Russian Rose" b/w "Just a Little Cottage"	1941	—	—	Decca
"London Pride" b/w "St. Mary's in the Twilight"	1941	—	—	Decca
"Lights Out 'til Reveille" b/w "Marie Elena"	1942	—	—	Decca
"No More" b/w "By Candlelight"	1942	—	—	Decca
"The Sailor with the Navy Blue Eyes" b/w "Madeleine"	1942	—	—	Decca
"Moonlight Cocktail" b/w "Sing Everybody Sing"	1942	—	—	Decca
"Three Little Sisters" b/w "Tangerine"	1942	—	—	Decca
"This Is Worth Fighting For" b/w "The Love Nest"	1942	—	—	Decca
"Thank You I'm Alright" b/w "Johnny and Mary"	1943	—	—	Decca
"Isobel Loves a Soldier" b/w "I Met Her on a Sunday"	1943	—	—	Decca
"Springtime on the Farm" b/w "Who's Knocking at My Heart?"	1943	—	—	Decca
"Homecoming Waltz" b/w "Nevada"	1943	2; 10	—	Decca
"By the River of the Roses" b/w "In a Shady Nook, by a Babbling Brook"	1944	7	—	Decca
"Don't Sweetheart Me" b/w "It's Love, Love, Love"	1944	2	—	Decca
"You Fascinating You" b/w "You're in Love"	1945	10	—	Decca
"I Can't Begin to Tell You" b/w "So-o-o in Love"	1946	2	—	Decca
"By the River of the Roses" (reissue) b/w "In a Shady Nook, by a Babbling Brook"	1949	— 3	—	His Master's Voice
"Far Away Places" b/w "Twelfth Street Rag"	1949	2 1	—	His Master's Voice
"Powder Your Face with Sunshine" b/w "For You"	1949	3	—	His Master's Voice
"On the 5.45" b/w "Lavender Blue (Dilly Dilly)"	1949	6; 1	—	His Master's Voice
"It Happened in Adano" b/w "A Strawberry Moon (In a Blueberry Sky)"	1949	19; 6	—	His Master's Voice
"Clancy Lowered the Boom" b/w "Dad's Birthday Waltz"	1949	15	—	His Master's Voice
"I Told Them All About You" b/w Medley: "Blue Skies"/"There's a Rainbow Round My Shoulder"/"If You Were the Only Girl in the World"	1949	—	1	His Master's Voice
"Church Bells on Sunday Morning" b/w "Twenty Four Hours of Sunshine"	1949	—	— 4	His Master's Voice
"My Golden Baby" b/w "Everywhere You Go"	1949	—	15	His Master's Voice
"The Last Mile Home" b/w "Lovers Lane Has Everything"	1949	17	—	His Master's Voice
"A Rose in a Garden of Weeds" b/w "Rolling Round the World"	1949	6	— 13	His Master's Voice
"Sleepy Town Express" b/w "The Birthday of the Little Princess"	1949	—	—	His Master's Voice
"Dear Hearts and Gentle People" b/w "I'll String Along with You"	1950	1; 7	—	His Master's Voice
"The Song Version of the Harry Lime Theme" b/w "Medley"	1950	1	3	His Master's Voice
"Music! Music! Music! (Put Another Nickel In)" b/w "Chattanoogie Shoe-Shine Boy"	1950	1	1	His Master's Voice
"(If I Knew You Were Comin') I'd 've Baked a Cake" b/w "Out of a Clear Blue Sky"	1950	1; 17	2	His Master's Voice
"Down in the Glen" b/w "When There's Love at Home"	1950	5	—	His Master's Voice
"Let's Do It Again" (with the Cherokeys) b/w "Daddy's Little Girl"	1950	4; 5	5; 17	His Master's Voice
"Across the Meadow (And Over the Hill)" (with the Cherokeys) b/w "Enjoy Yourself (It's Later Than You Think)"	1950	— 9	— 9	His Master's Voice
"Oh! You Sweet One" b/w "Dearie"	1950	5; 3	12; 7	His Master's Voice
"I Remember the Cornfields" b/w "The Hills of Wales"	1950	6	—	His Master's Voice
"Sometime" b/w "My Baby Told Me That She Loves Me"	1950	—	—	His Master's Voice
"Rudolph, the Red-Nosed Reindeer" (with the Voice of the Reindeer (Hattie Jacques)) b/w "Beloved, Be Faithful"	1950	1; 1	— 12	His Master's Voice
"Me and My Imagination" b/w "Hors D'Oeuvres"	1950	19	—	His Master's Voice
"My Heart Cries for You" (with the Merry Macs) b/w "Tennessee Waltz"	’1951	2; 1	— 8	His Master's Voice
"Mockin' Bird Hill" (with Jim Gussey) b/w "Get Out Those Old Records"	’1951	1	1	His Master's Voice
"An Armful of Roses" b/w "Mariandl Andl Andl"	’1951	—	— 15	His Master's Voice
"Sing a Little Sweeter" b/w "By the Kissing Rock"	’1951	—	—	His Master's Voice
"My Truly, Truly Fair" (Australia and New Zealand-only release) b/w "Mister and Mississippi"	’1951	—	1; 3	His Master's Voice
"I Hope You Have a Happy Birthday" b/w "Buttercups 'n Daisies 'n Bluebells"	’1951	—	—	His Master's Voice
"Cold Cold Heart" b/w "I Wish I Wuz"	’1951	— 13	—	His Master's Voice
"Hoop Diddle-Ee-I Doo-Ra-Li-Ay" b/w "If You Smile at the Sun"	’1951	—	—	His Master's Voice
"Why Worry" b/w "(I’m Cryin' 'Cause I Know I’m) Losin' You"	1952	4	—	His Master's Voice
"A Gordon for Me" b/w "There's Always Room at Our House"	1952	— 1	—	His Master's Voice
"Paint Yourself a Rainbow" b/w "Mistakes"	1952	— 2	—	His Master's Voice
"I Don't Care" b/w "We Won't Live in a Castle"	1952	—	—	His Master's Voice
"Marryin' Time" b/w "Meet Me on the Corner"	1952	—	—	His Master's Voice
"Am I in Love?" b/w "Farewell and Adieu"	1952	—	—	His Master's Voice
"A Mighty Pretty Waltz" b/w "One for the Wonder"	1952	—	—	His Master's Voice
"Two Humble People" b/w "Encore"	1952	—	—	His Master's Voice
"Barrels 'n Barrels of Roses" b/w "Lulu Had a Baby"	1953	—	—	His Master's Voice
"Banana Fingers" b/w "A Full Time Job"	1953	—	—	His Master's Voice
"The Calendar Song" b/w "She Wears Red Feathers"	1953	—	—	His Master's Voice
"Celebration Rag" b/w "In a Golden Coach (There's a Heart of Gold)"	1953	—	—	His Master's Voice
"Bottle Me Up" b/w "Your Cheatin' Heart"	1953	—	—	His Master's Voice
"No One Will Ever Know" b/w "Is It Any Wonder"	1953	—	—	His Master's Voice
"I Guess I'll Have to Change My Plan" b/w "A Shine on My Shoes"	1953	—	—	His Master's Voice
"Lonely" b/w "Changing Partners"	1954	—	—	His Master's Voice
"Friends and Neighbours" (Australia-only release) b/w "My Idea of Heaven"	1954	—	5	His Master's Voice
"Marcheta" (Australia-only release) b/w "Another Kiss"	1954	—	—	His Master's Voice
"Mister Sandman" (Australia-only release) b/w "Open Up Your Heart (And Let the Sunshine In)"	1955	—	1	His Master's Voice
"Hearts of Stone" (Australia-only release) b/w "Melody of Love"	1955	—	—	His Master's Voice
"Ko Ko Mo" (Australia-only release) b/w "When I Grow Too Old to Dream"	1955	—	13	His Master's Voice
"How Important Can It Be" (Australia-only release) b/w "I Can't Give You Anything but Love, Baby"	1955	—	—	His Master's Voice
"Cherry Pink and Apple Blossom White" (with Betty Parker; Australia-only release) b/w "If Anyone Finds This I Love You"	1955	—	—	His Master's Voice
"Bye Bye Blackbird" (Australia-only release) b/w "You'll Always Be My Lifetime Sweetheart"	1955	—	—	His Master's Voice
"Where Will the Dimple Be" (with Betty Parker; Australia-only release) b/w "Ukulele Baby"	1955	—	—	His Master's Voice
"Unchained Melody" (Australia-only release) b/w "You, My Love"	1955	—	—	His Master's Voice
"I Love Paris" (Australia-only release) b/w "It's Alright with Me"	1955	—	—	His Master's Voice
"I Just Want You to Want Me" b/w "Start Movin'"	1957	—	—	Oriole
"Oh! Oh! I'm Falling in Love Again" b/w "I Need Somebody"	1958	—	—	Oriole
"Roses from Venice" b/w "If There Are Stars in My Eyes (You Put Them There)"	1959	—	—	Columbia
"The Miracle of Love" (with the Vernon Girls) b/w "St. Christopher"	1960	—	—	Columbia
"Papa He Loves Mama" (with Janet Osborne) b/w "The House of Love"	1960	—	—	Columbia
"Sing (And Tell the Blues So Long)" (with the Rita Williams Singers) b/w "Magic Music"	1961	—	—	Columbia
"Put on a Happy Face" (with the Rita Williams Singers) b/w "Rose"	1961	—	—	Columbia
"Where Were You (When I Needed You)" (with the Rita Williams Singers) b/w "Rose"	1961	—	—	Columbia
"I'm a Dreamer" b/w "Come Take My Hand"	1964	—	—	Columbia
"As Long As You Love Me a Little" b/w "Say That You'll Always Love Me"	1964	—	—	Columbia
"Club Night Sing-Along – Part One" b/w "Club Night Sing-Along – Part Two"	1964	—	—	Columbia
"Love, Like Summer, Has Gone (L'Oublie)" b/w "I've Lost My Love"	1965	—	—	Columbia
"Put Your Head on My Shoulder" b/w "If I Had My Way"	1966	—	—	Columbia
"Games That Lovers Play" b/w "I Found My Love Today"	1966	46	—	Columbia
"Turn the World Around the Other Way" b/w "I Don't Know"	1967	—	—	Columbia
"Somewhere My Love" b/w "Theme from "Peyton Place""	1967	—	—	Columbia
"I Love You, and You Love Me" b/w "Tehairno Me Amore"	1967	—	—	Columbia
"Please Don't Go" b/w "I've Lost My Love"	1968	3	32	Columbia
"Was It Yesterday" b/w "When I Saw You This Morning"	1969	—	—	Decca
"Poem of Love" b/w "Adios, Baby, Goodbye"	1971	—	—	Decca
"Give Me One More Chance" b/w "I Never Knew I Loved You So"	1972	36	—	Decca
"Round and Round" b/w "When You Hear Our Song"	1972	—	—	Decca
"—" denotes releases that did not chart or were not released in that territory.

== Bibliography ==
- Peers, Donald (1951) Pathway, the autobiography, London Werner Laurie, 1951: ASIN B0017D2D0O
- Nobbs, George (1971) The Wireless Stars Wensum Books, ASIN: B01MCYF173
- Busby, Roy (1976) British Music Hall – An Illustrated Who's Who from 1850 to the Present Day Hofer Collins, ISBN 978-0236400539
