= Ron Merk =

American filmmaker, producer, and director

Ron Merk is an American independent filmmaker based in San Francisco. He is a producer and director best known for directing Marco Polo: Return to Xanadu.
