= Horace Gerlach =

American songwriter and musician

Horace Gerlach, known as Dutch, was a songwriter and musician, known for his work with Louis Armstrong and the song "Daddy's Little Girl".

== Early life ==
Gerlach was educated at Upper Darby High School.

== Music career ==
At 25 years old, Gerlach was working as a pianist and bandleader in Philadelphia. He became the ghostwriter and principal arranger for Louis Armstrong, and stayed in the position until 1940. However, trombonist Jimmy Archey criticised him as being "nothing much as an arranger".

In 1949, Gerlach wrote the song "Daddy's Little Girl" with Bobby Burke. It quickly became popular and was covered by several artists throughout its release year.

=== Swing That Music ===
Gerlach wrote sections of Armstrong's autobiography, Swing That Music, namely the section on the history of swing music. He was the cowriter of the song "Swing That Music" with Armstrong, which was composed especially for the book.

Gerlach was criticised by William Kenney for having "clumsy intrusions" within Armstrong's autobiographical voice and negotiation of the biracial jazz world. A focus of his analysis was the "ongoing rhetorical struggle" between Armstrong and Gerlach within the text. Scholars like Christopher Harlos have questioned the autobiographical authenticity of the text and the influence of Gerlach, especially in relation to the text's views on the relationship between jazz and conventional European music.

== Discography ==
- "If We Never Meet Again" (1936) with Louis Armstrong
- "Keep Away From My Doorstep" (1936)
- "Swing That Music" (1936) with Louis Armstrong
- "I've Got a Heart Full of Rhythm" (1937) with Louis Armstrong
- "What is This Thing Called Swing?" (1939) with Louis Armstrong
- "Daddy's Little Girl" (1949) with Bobby Burke
