= Marco Polo Junior Versus the Red Dragon =

- Theatrical release poster
- Directed by: Eric Porter
- Written by: Sheldon Moldoff
- Produced by: Sheldon Moldoff; Eric Porter
- Starring: Bobby Rydell; Arnold Stang
- Production companies: Animation International Inc.; Porter Animations
- Distributed by: British Empire Films
- Release dates: December 1972 (Australia); 12 April 1973 (United States)
- Running time: 82 minutes
- Country: Australia
- Language: English
- Budget: A$650,000

Marco Polo Junior Versus the Red Dragon (also known as Marco Polo Junior or The Red Red Dragon in the United States) is a 1972 Australian animated musical adventure film directed by Eric Porter, written by Sheldon Moldoff, and was the country's first animated feature film.

The film is not an adaptation of Marco Polo, Junior, a 1929 juvenile novel written by Harry A. Franck.

The two sequence directors of the film were Porter's animation director Cam Ford (who had previously worked on the Beatles' Yellow Submarine) and Peter Gardiner. The film was later re-edited and combined with new sequences to become Marco Polo: Return to Xanadu in 2001.

== Plot ==
Marco Polo Junior, the 49th in descent from the explorer of the same name, comes home from a fishing trip on an evening when a peculiar Easterly wind is observed. His grandfather realizes the wind is one of multiple signs that the time has come for an ancient prophecy involving their lineage to be fulfilled: the first Marco Polo's 49th heir must journey to the kingdom of Xanadu, wielding one half of a golden medallion that was given to Polo by Kublai Kahn in friendship. The medallion half must be rejoined with the other piece, carried down Kahn's lineage through the centuries, in order to save Xanadu from rising evil forces. Marco is attacked by a condor trained as a scout for espionage, shortly after receiving the medallion; he quickly departs for Xanadu with his pet seagull, Sandy.

Meanwhile, in Xanadu, the Princess Shining Moon's Minister of State, the Red Dragon, usurps the throne and imprisons the princess, intending to force her to marry him for legitimacy. Learning that his spies have failed to capture the heir of Marco Polo, he enlists his magical oracle, the Voice of the Flame, to raise a gale at sea to drown Marco Jr. Marco survives the storm, and is eventually rescued by a ship occupied by perennially drunken pirates. The pirates make Marco swab the ship's deck, while contemplating stealing his medallion for themselves, but continue to spend their time drinking. During the night, Marco is met by a sober crewman who laments the current state of affairs on the ship, and volunteers to steer it towards Xanadu to aid in his mission. The next morning, the captain of the ship directs his men to take Marco's medallion by force; Marco escapes and ends up adrift in the sea once more, but is able to row himself in a barrel towards an Indian harbour.

The Red Dragon's spies, escorted by his army, track Marco down to the market at the harbour, and give chase when they find him. As he flees them, he encounters the Guru, a wise, mystical sage who teaches his followers that their perspectives are illusory, demonstrating this by making them mass hallucinate two snakes in baskets. Knowing of the prophecy, the Guru hides Marco from the Red Dragon's spies and confuses them with hallucinations, allowing for Marco and himself to escape. He volunteers to guide Marco the rest of the way to Xanadu, and they make for the mountains which border the kingdom. The spies and the soldiers continue their pursuit in the mountains, but are thwarted when Marco and the Guru are serendipitously rescued by the Delicate Dinosaur, a friendly, hypochondriac dinosaur who was put in charge of guarding the mountains by the Kahns, centuries before. The Delicate Dinosaur ends up sneezing the heroes into an "express cave" leading to the valley just outside of the kingdom. There, they meet Princess Shining Moon, who has escaped the Red Dragon with the help of her faithful servant Pangu, and her elephant steed, Maja. Over a shared meal, Marco's identity is revealed; meanwhile he and the princess become enamoured of each other. The pair proceed to share a dance, romanticizing over their prophesied meeting, but are found by the Red Dragon's soldiers and brought to Xanadu.

The Red Dragon offers to release Marco if he will surrender his half of the Medallion of Friendship, but Marco refuses, and attempts escape with the princess. Although she is recaptured, he escapes via a kite, until the condor destroys it when enlisted to pursue him. Believing Marco to have fallen to his death, the Red Dragon orders for the wedding/coronation to commence. Pangu and the Guru sneak into Xanadu to try and help, but Pangu is recognized by the Red Dragon's spies and arrested; the Red Dragon uses the threat of his execution to coerce the princess's cooperation. Sandy locates Marco in a forest, alive but unconscious, and brings the Guru and Maja to him. The Guru revives Marco, and they storm the palace courtyard just in time to stop the ceremony. In terror, the Red Dragon flees into the tower where the Voice of the Flame is held, followed closely by Marco. He attempts to use the Voice of the Flame to burn Marco, but the oracle turns on him, forcing him out of the window of the tower. The Red Dragon's condor saves him from falling and carries him away, despite his master's ungrateful complaints about his talons.

Marco and Shining Moon join their medallion halves together, fulfilling the prophecy to the kingdom's rejoice. Shining Moon expects Marco to stay and marry her, but Marco apologetically informs her that he has undisclosed plans he wishes to see to, first. As the princess and her entourage tearfully see Marco and Sandy off, he promises that he will one day return, assuring Shining Moon of his love.

== Voice Cast ==
Character	1972 Version	Marco Polo: Return to Xanadu Version
Marco Polo Junior	Bobby Rydell	Nicholas Gonzales
Marco Polo Junior	Bobby Rydell	Joe Pizzulo (singing)
The Delicate Dinosaur	Arnold Stang	John Matthew
Princess Shining Moon/Princess Ming Yu	Corie Sims	Elea Bartling
Princess Shining Moon/Princess Ming Yu	Corie Sims	Terry Wood (singing)
Red Dragon/Foo-Ling	Kevin Golsby	Tony Pope
The Guru/Babu	Larry Best	Tony Pope
Minion A/Wong Wei	Lionel Wilson	Paul Ainsley
Minion B/Lo Fat	Arthur Anderson	Michael Kostroff

=== Additional Voices ===
- 1972 Version: Gordon Hammet, Merril E. Joels, Sam Gray
- Marco Polo: Return to Xanadu Version: John Matthew (Marco Polo the Explorer), Elea Bartling (Maiden on Pirate Ship), Tony Pope (Reginald the Seagull), Michael Kostroff (Kubla Khan), John C. Hyke (Malgor the Vulture, Sailing Ship Captain), Robert Kramer (Helmsman, Voice of the Flame, Grandpa), Alan Altshuld (Pangu, Mr. Giovanni, Marriage Priest), Tim Bryon Owen (Space Station Captain, First Mate, Kubla Khan's Servant), Cheddy Hart, Chris Holter

== Production ==
The film was conceived by Sheldon Moldoff, who made the film as a co-production with Eric Porter in Australia. $60,000 of the budget was provided by the Australian Film Development Corporation. Preliminary story board work was done in the U.S., but most of the film was done in Australia. It was Porter's first feature since A Son is Born in 1946.

Over 70 artists were involved in the film. Sequence directors were Cam Ford and Peter Gardner, and animators were Paul McAdam, Yvonne Pearsall, Dick Dunne, Gairdon Cooke, Richard Jones, Gerry Grabner, Stan Walker, Cynthia Leech, Peter Luschwitz, Kevin Roper and children's illustrator Kilmeny Niland. Background work was by Graham Liney and Yvonne Perrin, sister of Disney's Sleeping Beauty background stylist Eyvind Earle. Production took place from mid 1970 until May 1972.

Only one voice, that of the Red Dragon, was provided by an Australian; actor and comedian Kevin Golsby.

== Release ==
Shortly before the film's release in December 1972, an Australian/American cartoon special about the original Marco Polo screened on Australian television, prompting the film's distributors to make the title longer to avoid confusion. However, commercial results were poor, largely due to insufficient promotion by the U.S. distributors, although it did reasonably well in Australia and Europe. The low returns from the film persuaded Porter to undertake sub-contracted TV series work from America's Hanna-Barbera (The Amazing Chan and the Chan Clan, Super Friends, plus several one-off animated TV specials), but a subsequent financial recession in 1975 finally saw Porter shutting down his animation studio.

Three books were published using art work from the film.

The film's title was changed to The Magic Medallion for its 1976 release on television.

The movie had its widest American exposure over the HBO and Showtime premium cable networks in 1983 and 1984 respectively, and later the film got an extremely hard-to-find VHS from Family Home Entertainment. The movie was later included on BCI Eclipse's Advantage Collection DVD set.

In 2015, the National Film and Sound Archive of Australia released a restored print of the movie on DVD to celebrate the centenary of Australian animation.

== Marco Polo: Return to Xanadu ==
Many years later, the story was re-edited and extended by scriptwriter (and original co-producer) Sheldon Moldoff, in collaboration with Ron Merk and, with additional footage, certain name changes like the Red Dragon to Foo-Ling, and added subplots, was released as Marco Polo: Return to Xanadu (2002) by Tooniversal Company. Lightyear Video and Warner Home Video handled the VHS/DVD release.

== See also ==
- List of films featuring dinosaurs
