= Lou Mangan =

Australian rules footballer

Personal information
- Full name: Louis Joseph Mangan
- Born: 26 May 1922; Ascot Vale, Victoria
- Died: 27 May 2015 (aged 93)
- Original team: South Melbourne Colts
- Height: 173 cm (5 ft 8 in)
- Weight: 67 kg (148 lb)

Playing career^{1}
| Years | Club | Games (Goals) |
| 1942, 1944 | South Melbourne | 14 (4) |
- ^{1} Playing statistics correct to the end of 1944.

Louis Joseph Mangan (26 May 1922 – 27 May 2015) was an Australian rules footballer who played with South Melbourne in the Victorian Football League (VFL).

Mangan also served in the Royal Australian Air Force during World War II. He joined Carlton & United Breweries in 1952 and became its managing director after 20 years' service.

Mangan was appointed an Officer of the Order of Australia in the 1984 Australia Day Honours for his "service to industry and to the community".
