= Ted Ray (comedian) =

English comedian (1905–1977)

- Born: Charles Olden; 21 November 1905; Wigan, Lancashire, England
- Died: 8 November 1977 (aged 71); London, England
- Occupation: Comedian
- Spouse: Dorothy Sybil Stevens
- Children: Robin Ray (1934-1998); Andrew Ray (1939-2003)

Ted Ray (born Charles Olden; 21 November 1905 – 8 November 1977) was an English comedian of the 1940s, 1950s and 1960s, on radio and television. His BBC radio show Ray's a Laugh ran for 12 years.

== Biography ==
Ray was born Charles Olden in Wigan, Lancashire, England, to comic singer and mimic Charles Olden (who used the stage-name Charlie Alden) and his wife Margaret Ellen (née Kenyon). His parents moved to Liverpool within days of his birth, and Liverpudlians regard him as a local. He was educated at Anfield council school and Liverpool Collegiate School, and as a youth wished to become a footballer.

As a comedian of the 1940s and 1950s, he demonstrated his ad-libbing skills in his weekly radio show Ray's A Laugh from 1949 until 1961. A music hall comedian, Ray usually played violin badly as part of his act, first as Hugh Neek, then "Nedlo the Gypsy Violinist". He also played comedy roles in several British films—notably as the headmaster in Carry On Teacher.

He is best remembered for the BBC Radio show Ray's a Laugh, a domestic comedy in which Kitty Bluett played his wife. Other actors and actresses who featured on the show included Peter Sellers, Fred Yule, Patricia Hayes, Kenneth Connor, Pat Coombs and Graham Stark; Sellers' earliest appearances predated The Goon Show by a couple of years. In 1949 and 1950, Ray was King Rat of the Grand Order of Water Rats.

Ray was an accomplished golfer, frequently playing with professional sportsmen. Later in his career, he appeared with Jimmy Edwards, Arthur Askey and Cyril Fletcher in the comedy radio panel game Does the Team Think?

Ray appeared on television, reading on Jackanory, a children's programme, in the 1960s and 1970s. In 1974, he presented a radio show on BBC Radio 2, The Betty Witherspoon Show, with Kenneth Williams, Miriam Margolyes and Nigel Rees. He was also involved in Jokers Wild, an ITV celebrity comedy game show (1969–74) which was chaired by Barry Cryer. Arthur Askey was another regular on the show.

He married showgirl Dorothy Sybil (b. 1909), daughter of mechanical engineer George Henry Stevens; the couple had two sons: Robin Ray, a well-known television personality in the 1960s and 1970s, who initiated Call My Bluff and specialist classical music shows, and Andrew Ray, a child star of the 1950s who had a long career on stage, film and television.

He was the subject of This Is Your Life on two occasions: firstly, in October 1955 when he was surprised by Eamonn Andrews at the BBC Television Theatre, and secondly in February 1975, when Andrews surprised him on the doorstep of his Southgate home.

In 1975, returning home from a day of golfing and alcohol, two of his passions, Ray was involved in a serious motor vehicle accident. The injuries sustained were physically debilitating and left him dependent on crutches; he was convicted of dangerous driving under the influence of alcohol.

On 16 June 1977, he recorded a half-hour interview talking about his life, which was broadcast on 25 July 1977. This was repeated on Radio 4 Extra's It's a Funny Business series on 3 November 2013.

On 8 November 1977, he suffered a fatal heart attack.

== The Ted Ray Show (1955–59) ==
The Ted Ray Show was a BBC TV production. The first series accented variety, with international guests; the second and third series had greater emphasis on stand-up comedy; the fourth featured domestic routines (with Kitty Bluett as Ted Ray's wife and Kenneth Connor as "that interfering brother-in-law"); the fifth and six—with new writers—concentrated on sketch comedy and were branded 'New Edition' and '1959 Edition' to underline the difference.

=== Cast ===
- Ted Ray
- Kitty Bluett – (series 4)
- Kenneth Connor – (series 4)
- Susan Neil – (series 2)
- Joe Robinson – (series 2)

=== Crew ===
- Sid Colin – Writer (series 1–4)
- Talbot Rothwell – Writer (series 1–4)
- George Wadmore – Writer (series 1–4)
- John Junkin – Writer (series 5 & 6 and special)
- Terry Nation – Writer (series 5 & 6 and special)
- Dave Freeman – Additional Material (3 shows)
- George Inns – Producer (series 1–5)
- Bill Ward – Producer (2 shows)
- Ernest Maxin – Producer (1 show)
- Barry Lupino – Producer (1 show)

=== Transmission details ===
- Number of episodes: 29 • Length: 28 × 60 mins • 1 × short special
- Series One (4) 21 May – 13 Aug 1955 • monthly Saturday mostly 9.15 pm
- Series Two (4) 28 Apr – 21 July 1956 • monthly Saturday mostly 9.15 pm
- Series Three (8) 19 Jan – 3 Aug 1957 • monthly Saturday mostly 8 pm
- Series Four (5) 25 Jan – 10 May 1958 • monthly Saturday 8 pm
- Series Five (3) 27 Sep – 22 Nov 1958 • monthly Saturday 8 pm
- Short special • part of Christmas Night with the Stars 25 Dec 1958 • Thu 6.25 pm
- Series Six (4) 31 Jan – 2 May 1959 • monthly Saturday mostly 7.30 pm

== Filmography ==
- Radio Parade of 1935 (1934)
- Meet Me Tonight (1952)
- Escape by Night (1953)
- My Wife's Family (1956)
- Please Turn Over (1959)
- The Crowning Touch (1959)
- Carry On Teacher (1959)
