= Gus Bluett =

Australian comic actor (1902–1936)

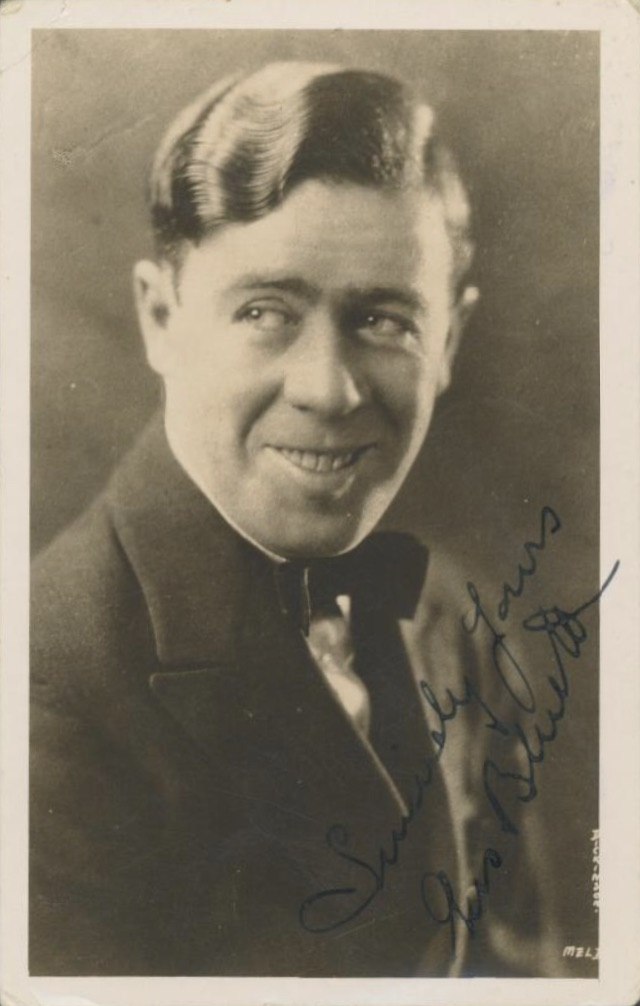
Gus Bluett c. 1920

Augustus Frederick Bluett (23 April 1902 – 14 March 1936), invariably referred to as "Gus", was an Australian comic actor.

== History ==
Bluett was born in Prahran, Victoria, son of Catherine Bluett, née McKechnie, and comedian Fred Bluett. While still young he accompanied his parents to England, where his father had an engagement.

On the family's return to Australia he took to the stage and never had any other employment. His successes include:

- Hullo Everybody in 1918, his first appearance for JCW
- Adrian van Piffle in The Cousin from Nowhere
- Timothy Gibbs in Our Miss Gibbs
- Jeremiah in The Quaker Girl
- Thaddeus T. Hopper in Katinka

Bluett, who had a long relationship with J. C. Williamson's, had been playing Yes, Madame in Melbourne, and only recently arrived in Sydney, had been suffering ill health for some time, but his death from haemorrhage in Sydney Hospital, was unexpected.

His remains were cremated at Rookwood Cemetery.

The radio actress Kitty Bluett (1916-1994) was his sister.
