= Constance Adelaide Stone =

Australian nursing sister (1879–1963)

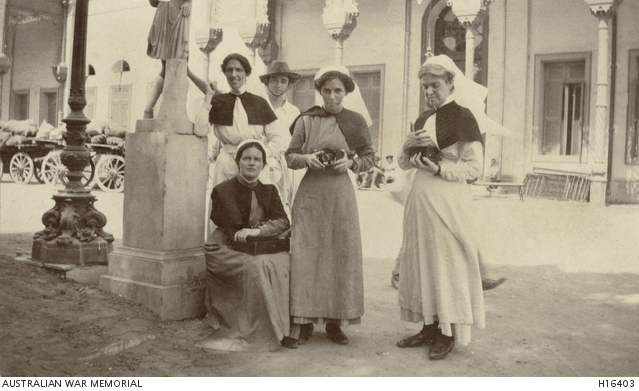
Sister Constance Stone (top left), with Sisters Margaret McKillop, M Martin and Amy Ennis in Egypt, 1915

Constance Adelaide Stone MBE ARRC (1879 – 28 May 1963) was an Australian nurse who served with the Australian Imperial Force in World War I and later joined the Northern Territory medical service.

== World War I service ==
Stone was born in 1879, in Berrima, New South Wales, to Henry and Augusta Stone and her father worked for the postal service. Little is known of Stone's early life but in November 1914, at age 35, she enlisted in the Australian Imperial Force and embarked from Sydney on 28 November 1914 on the HMAT A55 Kyarra.

She initially served on hospital ships that were travelling to and from Australia and, later, those travelling between France and England. On 15 June 1915, she was promoted to Sister and in May 1919 she was awarded the Royal Red Cross.

She returned to Australia in August 1919 and was discharged on 25 October 1919 and spent a brief period working at a private hospital in Orange before relocating to the Northern Territory.

== Life in the Northern Territory ==
Stone relocated to the Northern Territory in June 1924 and began working at the Darwin Hospital as the matron; she brought with her both general nursing and midwifery certificates. In 1927, she took a period of leave it was not sure that she would return and farewells were held which honoured her nursing capabilities. In August 1928, she was appointed as the matron of the Darwin public clinic.

At the hospital Stone took a particular interest in the baby health clinic and in regards to the antenatal work and, in 1928, was able to open a separate antenatal clinic where, within six months, 30 infants were enrolled. As a part of this Stone became the first nurse in the region to take statistics about the children and babies that she cared for and she would record the birth weights of children and compared the birth weights of children born in the Wet and Dry seasons. Starting from 1928, she also starting operating clinics treating pulmonary tuberculosis and venereal diseases where she treating not only those coming directly to them but people in contact with them.

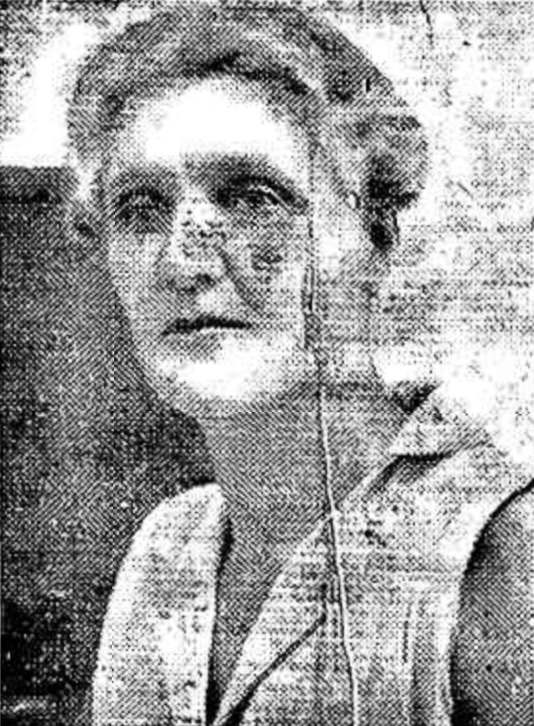
Stone in 1934

In 1929, she also became involved in medical school inspections throughout the Northern Territory to record height, weight, age and sex at school; she would also do tests for infestations such as hookworm. The schools in this program included those in Darwin, Pine Creek, Katherine and Alice Springs and also involved work in more remote areas. In this work she began to work closely with Clyde Fenton.

In 1928, she started operating clinics treating pulmonary tuberculosis and venereal diseases, treating not only those coming directly to them but also people in contact with them.

In 1934, Stone received a Member of the Order of the British Empire. Stone was one of the first nurses to receive this award and was among a record amount of women who received them that year. The Australian Women's Weekly stated:

Mothers in the Northern Territory greatly appreciate her work for the younger generation. Her award has evoked the greatest pleasure among the residents of the Northern Territory, as showing that Matron Stone's work has been appreciated by the authorities, and no recipient is more worthy of the honor.

— King honors record number of women, Australian Women's Weekly, 9 June 1934

Stone retired at the age of 60, in 1939, and left the Northern Territory.

She died in Crows Nest, New South Wales, on 28 May 1963, aged 83 or 84.

== Legacy ==
The following locations are named for Stone:

- Constance Court, in Moulden, Northern Territory.
- Stone Park, in Moulden, Northern Territory.
