= I Told Them All About You =

Single by Donald Peers
- B-side: "Medley"
- Released: 1949
- Genre: Pop
- Length: 3:29
- Label: His Master's Voice
- Songwriter(s): Cliff Friend

"I Told Them All About You" is a popular song written in 1927 by Cliff Friend. The song was a hit for the Welsh singer Donald Peers, reaching the top of the charts in Australia in June 1950.

== Charts ==
Chart (1950)	Peak position
Australia	1
