= Jacqueline Moya O'Brien =

Australian nurse (1926–2020)

Jacqueline Moya O'Brien née Seale OBE (10 May 1926 – 22 October 2020) was an Australian nurse born in Darwin who spent much of her career as a nurse educator and improving nurse education in the Northern Territory.

== Biography ==
O'Brien was born in Darwin and was the daughter of George and Mary Seale who lived in Parap and her father had worked as a manager of the Vic Hotel and, at the time of her birth, was the manager of the Parap Club; she was their only child. She attended primary school in Darwin, first at the Parap and then Darwin primary schools and she remembered a tremendous childhood being a child in Darwin and that there was always something to do and that, even during the Great Depression she was part of a "house of plenty".

Despite this, finding limited opportunities in Darwin in relation to education she went to Sydney in 1938 to attend Presbyterian Ladies' College for high school as a boarder; she had not wanted to go and initially very much struggled there. Due to the escalation of World War II O'Brien planned to return to Darwin in 1941 but this was delayed when her mother died of cancer and was then cancelled following the 1942 Bombing of Darwin. This left O'Brien in the care of a guardian, while still living as a boarder, whilst her father was serving overseas with the Merchant Navy.

In 1944, after completing her studies, O'Brien spent a brief period with the Australian Women's Land Army where she was deployed to the IXL factory in Newtown where she worked canning vegetables and she found this very difficult and did not enjoy the work.

Later in 1944, to get away from this work, O'Brien began nursing training at the Royal Prince Alfred Hospital in Sydney and, following its completion, undertook a post certificate qualification in the nursing of children at the Royal Alexandra Hospital for Children and then for her midwifery certificate at the Queen Victoria Hospital in Launceston in Tasmania.

In undertaking these studies O'Brien knew that she wished to return to the Northern Territory with these skills and education and was finally able to do so in January 1950 on a 12-month contract. There she worked at the newly re-established Darwin Hospital as the charge nurse within Ward Three, which was then a segregated ward for Aboriginal people and referred to as the 'Native Ward' although she also spent time at the Channel Island Leprosarium and in the children's and maternity wards. In this role she strove to improve the health treatment of Aboriginal people. On her return to Darwin O'Brien also immediately sought to improve the clinical nursing education program.

In 1951 O'Brien travelled in London where she worked as a staff nurse and nurse tutor at the Westminster Hospital for two years and the returned to Australia where she worked at the Concord Repatriation General Hospital in Sydney. There her skills as a nurse educator were recognised as she became the principle tutor and supervised six full time nurse educators and was in charge of the education program for all nurses. O'Brien believed it was important for all staff and students to pursue extra-curricular activities and, to promote this, established a student nurses musical and dramatic society.

It was while in Sydney, in 1964, that O'Brien married Vernon (Vern) O'Brien.

In 1965 O'Brien returned to Darwin with her husband and took up the position of nurse educator at the Darwin Hospital where she was the most qualified person to have held the position. In this role she introduced a scheme with was designed to better develop nurse clinical and practical skills by ensuring they undertook this work while studying. Before her arrival nurses trained through the Darwin Hospital School of Nursing was very small and, nurses who qualified through it, could often not obtain Australia-wide registration. In order to address this O'Brien ensured that all graduated were assessed by external examiners which enhanced their credibility. She was also proactive in the development of the Diploma in Applied Science (Community Health Nursing) at the Darwin Community College.

O'Brien was a founding member of the Nurses' Board of the Northern Territory and was a member of the board from 18 March 1976 to 10 March 1990 and from March 1990 to April 1995 she was employed, on a contract basis, by them as an assessor.

O'Brien formally retired, alongside her husband who had been working as the surveyor general of the Northern Territory, in 1980 and they began to travel regularly. In retirement she was also an active volunteer at the Charles Darwin University Nursing Museum for more than 20 years.

Later in her career O'Brien would also lecture on and publish about the history of nursing in the Northern Territory in which she acknowledged the harsh conditions under which they worked.

O'Brien died on 22 October 22 aged 94.

== Awards and honours ==
In January 1984 O'Brien was awarded the Order of Australia medal for services to nursing, especially nursing education and, on 25 June 1984, she received the insignia from Eric Johnston, the then Administrator of the Northern Territory, at a ceremony at Government House.

== Oral history interview ==
An oral history interviews with O'Brien are available through Library & Archives NT which were recorded in 1985 and 2017.
