= Janie Mason =

Australian nurse, educator and unionist

Janie Mason AM
- Born: 4 January 1941
- Occupation: Nurse, trade unionist
- Awards: Centenary Medal

Elizabeth Anne Mason AM (better known as Janie Mason) is a nurse, educator and curator who has worked in the Northern Territory of Australia for most of her adult life.

== Education ==
Mason trained for her general nursing training at Prince Henry's Hospital Melbourne and midwifery at Queen Victoria Hospital, Melbourne. She came to the Territory in 1964 with her husband Jon and worked as the nurse at Batchelor. This was followed by midwifery at Darwin Hospital and five years on Gove Peninsula. Immediately following Cyclone Tracy she earned a third certificate in infant health nursing at Tresillian Sydney.

== Career ==
Mason became a registered nurse working in acute care in urban and remote communities. She then taught secondary school science and Darwin Hospital nurse trainees.

Mason entered academia in 1983 retiring in 2014 as Senior Lecturer in Health/Nursing at Charles Darwin University. She was instrumental in starting the Charles Darwin University Nursing Museum there in 1987 and is its current curator. It features photographs, uniforms, documents, equipment and other ephemera.

She started the first VET nursing courses at Charles Darwin University, in the change-over of nurse-training in Australia from hospital-based to University-based.

Mason was the first woman president of the NT Trades & Labor Council from 2000 to 2004 for which she received a Centenary Medal for service to Australian society in union leadership in 2001. She was appointed a Member of the Order of Australia (AM) in 2019, and a D.Litt (Honoris causa) from Charles Darwin University in May 2021.
