= Daddy's Little Girl =

Song
- Published: 1950

"Daddy's Little Girl" is a classic song typically played at white weddings while a bride dances with her father. The song's lyrics and music were first written by Robert Harrison Burke and Horace Gerlach in 1949.

== Recordings ==
The song was recorded by British balladeer Steve Conway in 1950, and later by other artists, such as Al Martino on his 1967 Capitol Records release, Frank Fontaine on his 1963 ABC-Paramount single release, and Michael Bublé on his second album, the 2002 Canadian release, Dream. Although the Mills Brothers originally recorded the song in 1950, their 1976 re-recording was notably used in the soundtrack in the 2010 video game BioShock 2.

== Lyrics ==
You're the end of the rainbow, my pot of gold
You're Daddy's Little Girl to have and hold
A precious gem is what you are
You're Mommy's bright and shining star.

You're the spirit of Christmas; my star on the tree
You're the Easter Bunny to Mommy and me.
You're sugar, you're spice, you're everything nice
and you're Daddy's Little Girl.

x2

== Use in other media ==
The song has been featured on episodes of Laverne & Shirley and The Sopranos.
