= Ralph Beattie Blacket =

Australian physician and academic

Ralph Beattie Blacket AO (July 11, 1919 – 2010) was an Australian Foundation Professor of Medicine at the University of New South Wales in Australia. He was responsible for important research on beriberi and heart disease.

== Early life and education ==
Blacket graduated from Sydney Boys High School in 1935. He attended Sydney University, graduating in medicine in 1941, and won the University medal.

== Career ==
During World War II, Blacket joined the Royal Australian Army Medical Corps in New Guinea, and served in 1942 with the 45 New Guinea 9th Division, earning the rank of Major.

After the war Blacket completed his residency at the Royal Prince Alfred Hospital. He was a Hallstrom Fellow in Cardiology, and studied at Sydney University while lecturing part-time, graduating with a Doctor of Medicine in 1957. He researched the disease Beriberi, and his thesis won the Peter Bancroft Prize. He wrote a book about this called The Beri-beri Heart.

Blacket worked as a Professor of Medicine at the University of New South Wales, and as Director of Medicine at two hospitals. He studied the causes of heart disease, and proposed that cholesterol was a factor in heart disease. He established a group of researchers around him. He and Joan Mary Woodhill conducted research about diet, cholesterol and heart disease. He was a co-founder of The National Heart Foundation of Australia.

In 1977 he was quoted in the press regarding the high cost of tests used in modern diagnosis. Blaket participated in the Bunbury life study of clinical management of large hospitals, worked on medical advisory committees and published about 120 papers in medical journals.

Blacket was appointed an Officer of the Order of Australia in 1984 for his contributions to medicine.

IN 1999 Blacket was presented with an honorary degree by the University of New South Wales.

== Personal ==
Blacket was married to Margaret McIlrath and the couple had five children.
