= Hannah Wood (nurse) =

English nurse in 19th century Australia

Hannah Wood (c. 1827–1903) was a nurse in the Northern Territory of Australia. She arrived there from the UK in September 1875, joining her husband, James Wood, who had arrived a few months earlier.

== Early life ==
Wood was born to Jan and Thomas Inch in England around 1827. She worked as a nurse for the British government for several years. In 1859 she became assistant matron of Millbank Prison, resigning in 1864 to become a matron on ships taking single women to Australia.

=== In Australia ===
In 1869 Wood migrated to Australia, where she took up a position at the Sunbury Industrial School in Victoria. It was there that she met her husband James Wood; they married in December 1874. James then headed off to the new gold discoveries in the Northern Territory; she would join him a few months later. In 1880 James died leaving Hannah to support herself as nurse; she never remarried and died in Palmerston on 16 June 1903.

James Wood became the licensee of the Standard Hotel in Pine Creek, which they managed together until moving to Palmerston, where Hannah became the owner of property. In 1880 James Wood died of dysentery and Hannah returned to nursing to support herself. Wood would petition to the UK for the Queen Anne's Bounty, however this was refused on the grounds that most of her work had occurred in Australia and not in England.

== Palmerston ==
Following the death of her husband Wood returned to nursing, working with the local doctor and families to provide care for people in the area. Following her application in 1888 for the position of Matron for the Burrundie Hospital she was appointed as acting Matron of the Palmerston Hospital; she held the position for a number of years.

During January 1897 Palmerston was impacted by a tropical cyclone that caused significant damage and recorded 294 millimetres (11.6 in) of rain; this would be the largest cyclone to hit Palmerston (Darwin) until Cyclone Tracy in 1974. Wood's house collapsed during the storm leaving her trapped; she was rescued by a group of Indigenous Australians who cared for her until the storm had passed. Wood was forced to appeal to the community for assistance to rebuild after assistance from the government fell short of the cost despite her highlighting that she had used the property to provide additional accommodation to patients of the Hospital; the community rallied behind her request for help.

Following an accident in 1902 that hospitalised Wood for considerable time the community petitioned to the government for the procurement of a special pension. They outlined her service to the community from escorting new migrants to Australia to efforts in providing nursing services. The Minister for the Northern Territory (then part of South Australia) offered if necessary a bed in the Palmerston Hospital but declined the pension. Woods decline this offer, preferring to remain in her home; her body was found on 16 July 1903.

Because no Catholic priest was in the region, the funeral service for Wood was conducted by a member of the railway staff. A newspaper report after the service expressed displeasure about the lack of attendance, given how much she had done for the community over the years.
