= Fred Yule =

English actor (1893–1982)

Frederick Robert Yule (7 October 1893 – 11 December 1982) was an English character actor, comedian and singer, mainly known for his appearances in post-war BBC Radio programmes such as ITMA, Ray's a Laugh, Band Waggon (1947 era) and The Archers.

== Career ==
Born in Norfolk, Yule began his stage career as a singer in pantomime, West End musicals and music hall. He first broadcast in 1925, as the vocalist with Herman Darewski's orchestra. After that, he became a prolific broadcaster with a wide range, including variety, drama, features, talks, and programmes for young listeners. His voice was well known to a generation of radio listeners as the one that stopped "the mighty roar of London's traffic" at the start of each episode of In Town Tonight.

Yule also provided more than one voice in a radio adaptation of Three Men in a Boat by Hubert Gregg. This was repeated, after many years in the archives, on BBC Radio 4 Extra. Yule's sole film appearance was in The Charcoal-Burner's Son (1939).

== Personal life and death ==
He was married to the music hall actress Doreen Monte. Yule died in Southend-on-Sea, Essex, on 11 December 1982, aged 89.
