= Ray's a Laugh =

British radio comedy series (1949–1961)

- Genre: Sitcom, variety show
- Running time: 30 minutes
- Country of origin: United Kingdom
- Language: English
- Home station: BBC Home Service; BBC Light Programme
- Syndicates: BBC Radio 4 Extra
- Starring: Ted Ray; Kitty Bluett; Fred Yule; Patricia Hayes; Peter Sellers; Kenneth Connor; Laidman Browne
- Written by: Ronnie Hanbury (series 1); Eddie Maguire (series 1-4); Ted Ray (series 1-5); George Wadmore (series 3-6); Sid Colin (series 6); Talbot Rothwell (series 6); Charles Hart and Bernard Botting (series 7-11)
- Produced by: George Inns (series 1-5); Roy Speer (series 1, 6); Leslie Bridgmont (series 7-11)
- Original release: 4 April 1949 – 13 January 1961
- No. of series: 11
- No. of episodes: 361 (including 3 specials)
- Website: www.bbc.co.uk/programmes/b00snjlj

Ray's a Laugh is a British BBC Radio comedy series starring Ted Ray which ran from 1949 to 1961. According to latter-day historians of the era, the show was "hugely popular with the British public" and "one of the major hits of post-war radio comedy".

== Background ==
Ted Ray's alter ego in variety had been Nedlo, the Gypsy Violinist. Ray's birth name was Charles Olden, but by 1949, he was appearing as Ted Ray (named after the golfer), and this was how he billed himself for his radio series, which was devised by BBC producer George Inns. The show was BBC Radio's replacement for It's That Man Again. Other names considered for the series were Hoo-Ray For Fun and Hip-Hoo-Ray.

== Format ==
For most of the show's run, Ray's a Laugh was a domestic comedy. However, it started off as an American-style three-'spot' show with songs and music. In some sketches, Ray worked for the Cannon Enquiry Agency, later joining the Daily Bugle as a reporter.

Ray's wife was played by Kitty Bluett. From the third series onwards, the show was dominated by scenes featuring Ted and Kitty. Bluett left the show to appear in an unsuccessful spin-off in 1955, but returned the following year.

== Cast ==
Regular cast members were:

- Ted Ray
- Kitty Bluett (series 1-5, 7-11)
- Patricia Hayes (series 1-6)
- Peter Sellers (series 1-5)
- Kenneth Connor (series 6-11)
- Fred Yule (series 1-2, 4, 7)
- Bob and Alf Pearson (series 1-2)
- Leslie Perrins (series 1-2)
- The Beaux and the Belles (aka The Keynotes) (series 1-2)
- Jack Watson (series 3)
- Charles Leno (series 3)
- John Hanson (series 3)
- The Kingsmen (series 3)
- Graham Stark (series 3)
- Patricia Gilbert (series 4)
- Charles Hawtrey (series 4-5)
- Diane Hart (series 6)
- Alexander Gauge (series 6)
- Pamela Manson (series 6)
- Laidman Browne (series 7-11)
- Elsie Palmer (series 7)
- Pat Coombs (series 11)

== Music ==
Ray's signature tune was "You Are My Sunshine", which prefaced the opening title song, named after the show and written by Ray. "You Are My Sunshine" closed the show until 1951. Music for the first three series came from Stanley Black and the BBC Dance Orchestra. For series 4 and 5, music was by Paul Fenoulhet and the BBC Variety Orchestra.

In the first two series, songs came from an act known to listeners as the Beaux and the Belles, who had the same personnel as The Keynotes – Johnnie Johnston, Alan Dean, Pearl Carr, Irene King – with the addition of Don Elmsley. Bob and Alf Pearson provided another musical interlude, their signature tune being "We bring you melodies from out of the sky, my brother and I". In series 3, music came from John Hanson and The Kingsmen performing.

== Catchphrases ==
A notable feature of the show was its catchphrases. The character of Ivy (played by Ted Ray) would show her devotion to Mrs Hoskins (Bob Pearson) by saying "you're a lovely woman, Mrs Hoskins!" The latter would remark in turn: "It was agony, Ivy!" This catchphrase was included in The Oxford Dictionary of Quotations.

Mrs Hoskins would mention "young Dr Hardcastle", to which Ivy would reply, "He's loo-vely, Mrs Hoskins, he's loo... ooo... vely!"

Bob Pearson also played a little girl called Jennifer who, when asked her name, would reply: "Jen-ni-fer!"

In addition, there was the adenoidal "If you haven't been to Manchester, you haven't lived" from Tommy Trotter (Graham Stark). Another feature was the glamour girl who would do anything, but "Not until after six-o'clock!"

== Broadcast ==
Ray's a Laugh was a half-hour programme which ran from April 1949 until January 1961. It started on 4 April 1949, being broadcast on Mondays at 7.30pm on the BBC Home Service. From June 1949 to June 1950, when the first series ended, it went out on Tuesdays. It was then usually broadcast on Thursdays until the end of series 6 in April 1954. The sixth series was the last to be broadcast on the Home Service.

For the seventh series, beginning in October 1956, it was broadcast on the Light Programme. The next series moved to Fridays. This continued until the eleventh and final series, with the show ending on 13 January 1961.

Over the course of the show's history, 361 episodes were broadcast, including three specials.

Since 2010, archive episodes have been repeated on BBC Radio 7 and its successor, Radio 4 Extra.

== Home media releases ==
In 1990, a BBC Radio Collection double cassette of the series was released, featuring four episodes from 1949 and 1950.
