= Eric Porter (filmmaker) =

Australian filmmaker, animator (1911–1983)

Eric Ernest Porter AM (19 June 1911 — 1 May 1983) was an Australian filmmaker and animator who specialised in documentaries and commercials, but also made several features, such as A Son Is Born. He directed Australia's first animated feature, Marco Polo Junior Versus the Red Dragon (1972). That film's financial failure forced him to close his animation studio.

Porter was made a Member of the Order of Australia (AM) with effect 20 December 1983 in the 1984 Australia Day Honours for "service to the film industry particularly in the field of animation".

== Select filmography ==
- A Son Is Born (1946) – producer, director
- Marco Polo Junior Versus the Red Dragon (1972) – director, producer
- The Yellow House (TV series)
- Polly Me Love (1976) (TV movie)
