= Ruth Heathcock =

Australian nurse (1901-1995)

Ruth Sabina Heathcock BEM (née Rayney) (11 January 1901 – 7 May 1995) was an award-winning remote area nurse in the Northern Territory of Australia who specialised in the treatment of leprosy. She received an Order of the British Empire for rowing 145 kilometres to save a man who accidentally shot himself.

== Early life ==
Heathcock was born in Murray Bridge in South Australia in 1901, one of seven children of railway engineer Frederick John Rayney and his wife Emily Melissa (née Soar). She was interested in Aboriginal culture from childhood, where she befriended many Aboriginal people in the region. She trained to be a nurse from the age of 16, training at the Adelaide General Hospital and later the Lameroo Hospital. She fell ill during this time, and had a lung removed. After she recovered she went to work at Point McLeay Mission.

== Life in the Northern Territory ==
In 1930 Heathcock sailed from Adelaide to Darwin on the Malabar to join Dr John Flynn's Australian Inland Mission. She commenced working at the tin mining settlement Maranboy where she met and married English soldier and Mounted Constable Ted Heathcock on 5 November 1931 at the Mataranka Hotel. They moved to Borroloola at Roper Bar region where Ted worked as a policeman. Heathcock began treating Aboriginal people with leprosy. She lobbied to treat people on their land, despite policy at the time that required lepers to be moved to an isolated facility on Channel Island in Darwin Harbour. She developed close relationships to Alawar people, who took her to remote areas to treat lepers who were hiding to avoid relocation. Ted eventually wrote to the League of Nations in Geneva outlining a case for people to be treated on their land. It was eventually adopted by the Administration.

In March 1941, she rowed 145 kilometres to rescue a man named Horace Foster who had accidentally shot himself. He had sent a note with an Aboriginal man to the Borroloola Police Station requesting help. It read:

"Have shot myself accidentally. Think I am settled. Can you come out? Shot the bone in two above the knee. May bleed to death."

She was taken by four Aboriginal people, Roger Jose and Jupiter and their wives Bessie and Maggie down the McArthur River into the open sea to the mouth of the Wearyan River in a dugout canoe, a three-day journey. While she treated his wound, he died just an hour before the arrival of the flying doctor. The act of bravery won her an Order of the British Empire in 1951.

During World War II, Heathcock and her husband were evacuated, Ted to Alice Springs where he died in 1943, while Ruth took a group of lepers to South Australia. She then accompanied them back to Darwin before moving to Alice Springs to care for Aboriginal children with her sister.

== Later life ==
By the early 1980s Heathcock had moved to Kingston Park in Adelaide to live with her sister. She was named 'citizen of the year' in 1988 by the Marion Council. She returned to the Territory in 1984 for the filming of a documentary about her life by Karen Hughes called Pitjiri: the snake that will not sink. She was named Pitjiri in 1936 by a group of Aboriginal people from Arnhem Land, meaning 'a snake that floats on water and cannot sink'.

Heathcock died on 7 May 1995 at the age of 94.
