= Fred Bluett =

Australian radio actor

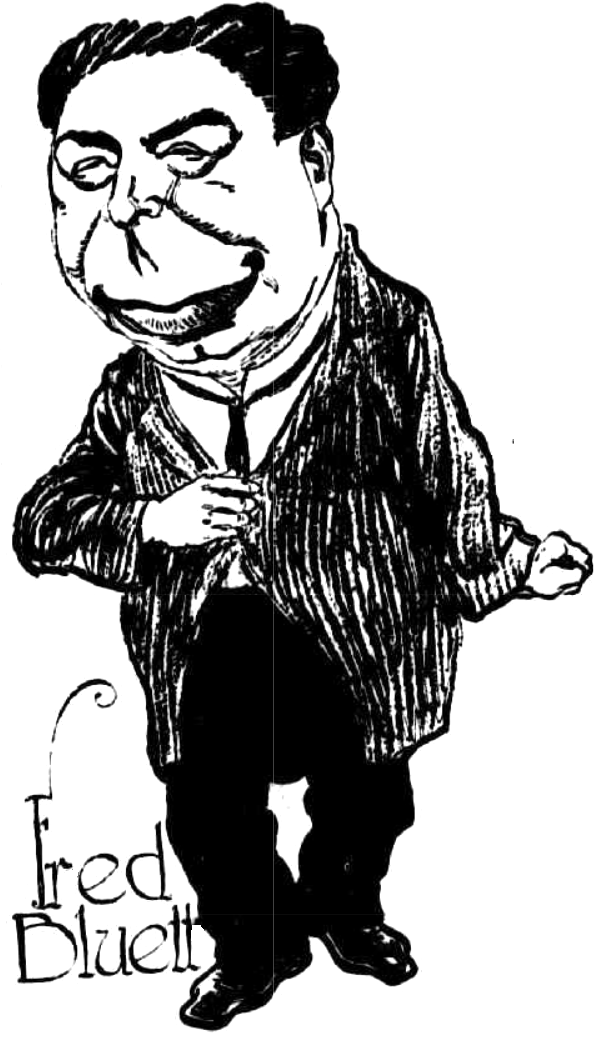
- Born: Frederick George Bluett; 20 January 1876; Middlesex, London, England, United Kingdom
- Died: 3 December 1942 (aged 66); Double Bay, New South Wales, Australia
- Occupation(s): Vaudevillian, radio actor
- Known for: Works with the company of Fuller Circuit, Tivoli New Minstrel, J.C. Williamson

Frederick George Bluett (20 January 1876, Middlesex, London – 3 December 1942, Double Bay, New South Wales) was a London born vaudevillian and radio actor.

== Biography ==
Bluett was the son of comedian and stage actor Frederick William Bluett, and his grandfather had also been a stage performer. Fred came to Australia as a fifteen year old in 1891 and remained in the region for the rest of his life. Not long after arriving in Australia Bluett left for New Zealand, spending almost a decade working for the Fullers on their Dominion circuit. He returned to Australia in 1902 under contract to Harry Rickards and over the next three decades cemented his reputation as one of the region's premier comedians.

Bluett's children Augustus Frederick "Gus" Bluett (born 23 April 1902, Prahran, Victoria – 14 March 1936) and radio performer Kitty (born 1916), to dressmaker wife Catherine McKechnie, whom he married in April 1901, also became well-known comedians in their own right. His other daughter was Belle (born 1909).

Bluett died of coronary vascular disease on 3 December 1942.

== Selected credits ==
- An Interrupted Divorce (1916) – short film
- Showgirl's Luck (1931) – film
- Cinesound Varieties (1934) – film
