= Darwin Hospital =

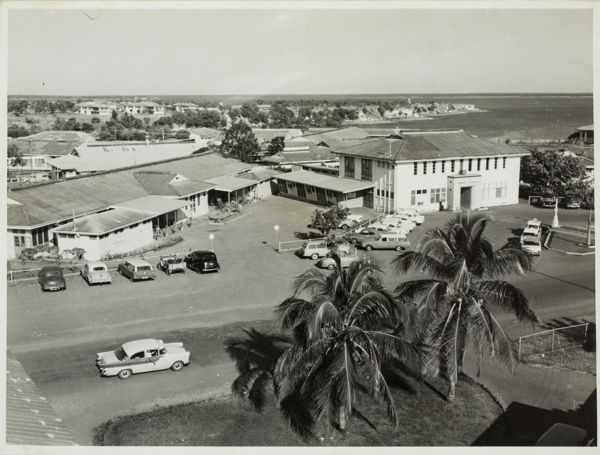
- The Old Darwin Hospital in the 1960s

Geography
- Location: Myilly Point, Larrakeyah, Northern Territory, Australia
- Coordinates: 12.45277778°S 130.82916667°E

Services
- Beds: 359 (1970)

History
- Founded: 1942
- Closed: 1980

Links
- Lists: Hospitals in Australia

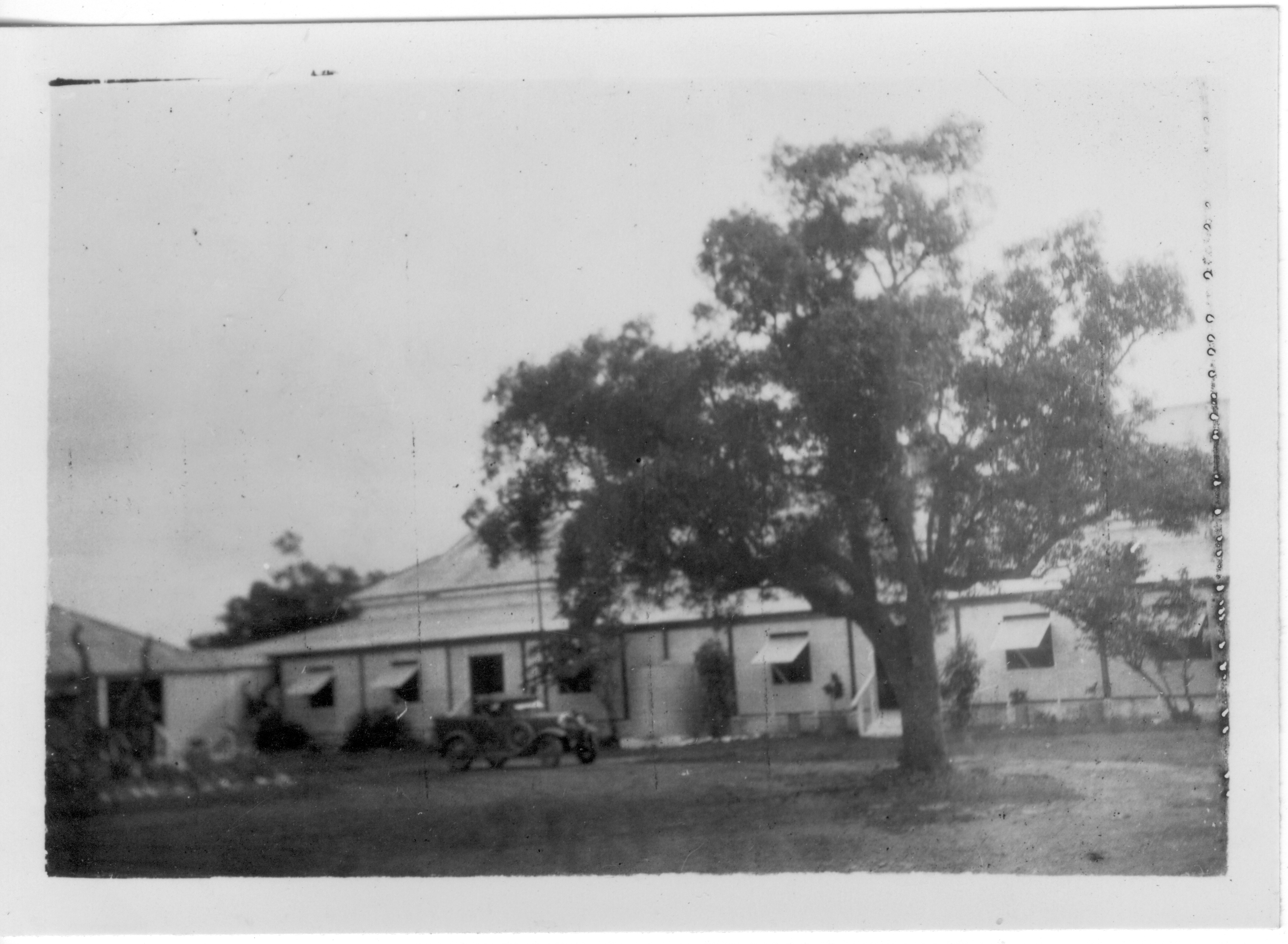
Darwin Hospital in 1938

The Darwin Hospital was a former hospital that was located at Myilly Point in Larrakeyah, an inner suburb of Darwin, Northern Territory in Australia. It was the second public hospital to be built in the city, replacing a facility that had originally opened in 1874 nearby on Packard Street, Larrakeyah. The hospital had a short but eventful history, being extensively damaged by air-raids during World War II and by Cyclone Tracy in 1974. For most of its operating life, the hospital maintained segregated wards for Aboriginal patients, a policy that did not extend to those of mixed race or Asian descent. It was replaced by Royal Darwin Hospital in the early 1980s.

== History ==
By the late 1930s, the original hospital did not have sufficient space or equipment to meet the needs of the town. The Kahlin Compound on Lambell Terrace, then an institution for Aboriginal children forcibly removed from their home communities, was identified as the site for a new hospital, with the first wards opening on that site to treat venereal disease amongst the Indigenous population there during 1938. After the residents were moved to Bagot Reserve in 1939, the Army established a temporary tent hospital on the site, however under these conditions, dengue fever was rife.

=== World War II ===
With the outbreak of war in Europe, military leaders grew concerned about Japanese aggression in the Pacific and requested the Federal government commit to building a new permanent hospital in Darwin as a priority. This was approved in 1940, with construction of the 89-bed facility beginning in January 1941. The war interrupted the delivery of medical equipment, including X-ray machines, which did not arrive ahead of the new hospital's opening on 2 February 1942. Some equipment was loaned by the Australian and United States Army, while the hospital ship Manunda was also sent to Darwin to support the build up of military personnel in the city.

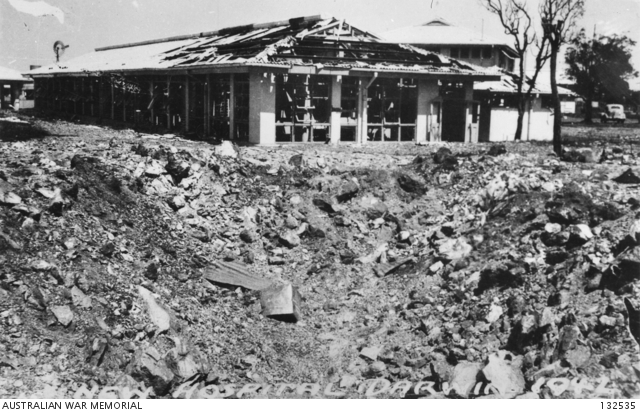
Bomb crater and damaged buildings at Darwin Hospital after the 19 February 1942 air raid

Despite being clearly marked by red crosses painted on the roof, Ward 1 and a number of nearby staff residences at the new hospital were damaged when eight bombs landed in the vicinity at around 10:05 am during the first Japanese air raids on the city on 19 February 1942. Despite the damage, the hospital received the majority of civilian casualties for treatment following the raid. Shortly afterwards, the hospital was placed under the Army's control and the remaining civilian nursing staff were evacuated interstate.

=== Post war ===
Damage sustained as a result of the bombing and debris from subsequent attacks was not repaired until after the war. When the Department of Health resumed control of the hospital, staff arriving in 1946 found roofs that leaked and broken equipment. Other works that had been planned before the war, including landscaping and sealing of access roads were finally completed in 1950, but many staff were forced to live in war-time Army huts until well into the 1960s. During the late 1940s, poor living and working conditions persisted and prolonged industrial action damaged the hospital's reputation.

Conditions began to improve in the 1950s as new staff accommodation was built. The hospital was able to attract and retain a surgeon from 1949 onwards, followed by other specialists. By 1966, the hospital was able to provide ophthalmology, gynaecology, psychiatric and pediatric specialist services. The 1960s saw a major expansion of the hospital opening in November 1967. This included the construction of the three-story, 90-bed Kahlin Ward. Temira House, a residential training facility for student nurses was also constructed as part of the expansion, along with an administration block, additional consulting rooms and the refurbishment of an existing block as an airconditioned maternity ward.

A second stage of redevelopment was planned during 1970 to further increase the available beds from 359 to 423, however authorities instead chose to build an entirely new hospital in the northern suburbs, to be completed by 1977. Rapid population growth in the early 70s saw the hospital struggle to cope with demand, and temporary wards were added in 1972 and 1973. Plans for a further permanent expansion, rebuilding much of the hospital into a 600-bed facility were deferred around this time.

=== Cyclone Tracy ===
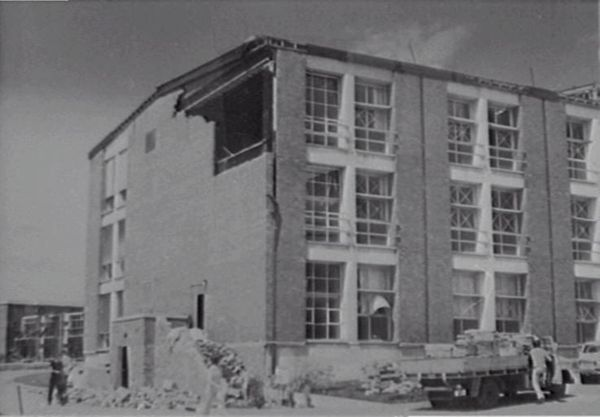
Hospital buildings damaged by Cyclone Tracy, December 1974

Darwin was struck by Cyclone Tracy on Christmas Eve in 1974. In the immediate aftermath of the storm, restoring power to the hospital was a priority for authorities. A building containing back-up generators had sustained damage and emergency repairs to this structure were amongst the first carried out in the city. Due to the timing of the storm, many of the hospital's staff were on holidays interstate, limiting the hospital's capacity to treat casualties, while the entire city was littered with debris restricting access to the facility. Despite this, more than 500 of the injured presented for treatment at the flooded outpatients ward.

The category 4 cyclone caused significant damage to several buildings at Darwin Hospital. The most severe was to the Kahlin Ward, where the hospital's birthing suite and nursery were located, as well as the pathology lab, which was completely destroyed. The upper floor of the Administration building suffered water damage, destroying much of the School of Nursing's library collection. The hospital's anaesthetist was one of 66 people killed by the storm. Amid fears that the lack of sanitation would lead to outbreaks of disease, the Director of Health recommended the city be evacuated while infrastructure was rebuilt. A temporary clinic was set up in the evacuation centre at Darwin High School to treat the injured and administer vaccinations to those waiting for flights to the southern states.

=== Closure ===
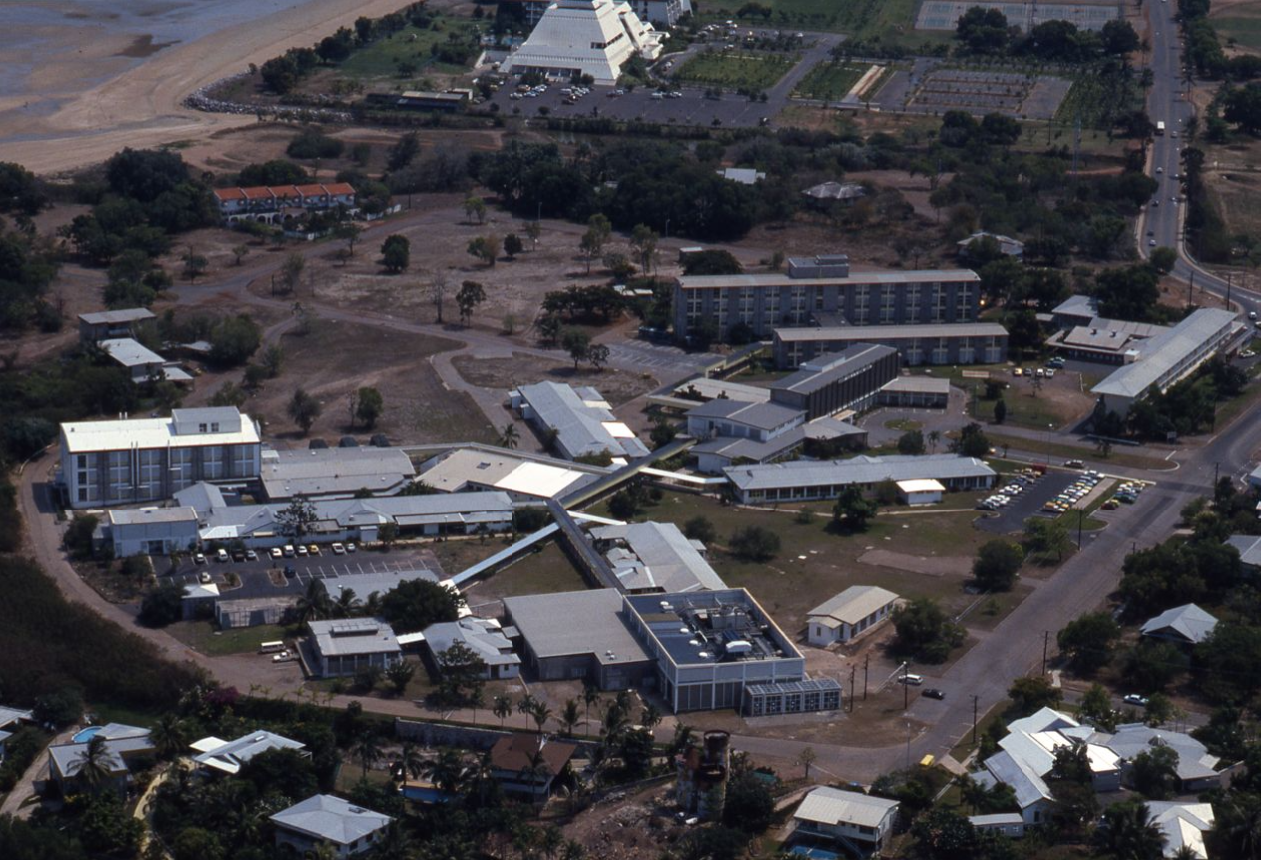
An aerial view of the former hospital in the 1980s

While cyclone damage had delayed construction of the new Casuarina Hospital, most services were relocated during 1980. 60 beds were retained at Darwin hospital, including geriatric and psychiatric units, as well as some outpatient rehabilitation services, administration and training facilities. Although it was forecast that the hospital would continue to operate until at least 1985 in an auxiliary capacity, with improvements to community health services such as home-based nursing, the number and duration of admissions declined. The old hospital was no longer needed, with cyclone damaged buildings demolished during 1981–82 and others repurposed for uses such as a temporary home for Larrakeyah Primary School until 1985.

A number of remaining buildings at Myilly Point were refurbished ahead of the opening of the University College of the Northern Territory in April 1987, which was merged with the Darwin Institute of Technology forming the Northern Territory University in 1989. The university retained the Myilly Point campus until 1997. All remaining buildings were demolished in the late 1990s, despite calls for the nurse's quarters to be preserved as part of the Myilly Point heritage precinct.

== Current status ==
Since the hospital's demolition, there have been various proposals to reuse the Myilly point site, including as a tourism development. In the 2000s, a concept plan was developed for the area that included residential development, but retained large sections of the site as public space. In February 2017, the Northern Territory Government announced that a new $50 million museum would be built on the site, recognising both the hospital and in particular, the significance of the Kahlin Compound as part of Territory's multicultural heritage. In October of that year, workers preparing the site discovered it to be contaminated with asbestos rubble, requiring additional remediation works.

The expensive museum proposal proved extremely unpopular with the community, and the plans were abandoned in 2018, despite an architectural firm being engaged to design the building. Removal of asbestos from the site was completed by 2021, with the area landscaped and opened as a public park including a large children's playground, skate park and basketball court. No trace of the hospital remains.
