= Billy Ternent =

British orchestra leader (1899–1977)

- Born: Frederick William Ternent; 10 October 1899
- Origin: Newcastle upon Tyne, England
- Died: 23 March 1977 (aged 77)
- Genres: Big band, British dance band, Swing
- Occupations: Composer, arranger, band leader

Frederick William Ternent (10 October 1899 – 23 March 1977) was a British orchestra leader, popular from the 1940s to the 1970s, best known for backing Frank Sinatra and his work at the London Palladium.

== Biography ==
Ternent was born Frederick William Ternent in Newcastle upon Tyne on 10 October 1899, and began his professional music career in 1927, joining Jack Hylton's showband, becoming its principal arranger and multi-instrumentalist. He remained with the band until the outbreak of World War II, and proceeded to lead orchestras for the BBC throughout the early 1940s. He formed his own band in 1944, and began conducting pit bands for various West End theatre shows. In the 1950s, he provided the backing orchestra to Frank Sinatra when he toured the UK, who described him as "the little giant". From 1962 to 1967 he was the musical director for the London Palladium.
