= Joan Sims filmography =

The Joan Sims filmography lists the film and television appearances of the English actress Joan Sims (1930–2001).

== Filmography ==
=== Film ===
Year	Title	Role	Notes
1953	The Square Ring	Bunty	
1953	Will Any Gentleman...?	Beryl	
1953	Meet Mr. Lucifer	Fairy Queen	
1953	Trouble in Store	Edna	
1954	Doctor in the House	Rigor Mortis	
1954	What Every Woman Wants	Doll	
1954	The Young Lovers	Telephone Operator, American Embassy	Uncredited
1954	The Belles of St. Trinian's	Miss Dawn	
1954	To Dorothy a Son	Telephone Operator	
1954	The Sea Shall Not Have Them	Hilda Tebbitt	
1955	As Long as They're Happy	Linda	
1955	Doctor at Sea	Wendy Thomas	
1956	Lost	Ice Cream seller in the park	Uncredited
1956	Keep It Clean	Violet Tarbottom	
1956	The Silken Affair	Lady Barber	
1956	Dry Rot	Beth	
1956	Stars in Your Eyes	Walter's Secretary	
1957	Carry On Admiral	Mary	
1957	No Time for Tears	Sister O'Malley	
1957	Just My Luck	Phoebe	
1957	The Naked Truth	Ethel Ransom	
1958	Davy	Waitress	
1958	Passport to Shame	Miriam (phone operator in taxi office)	Uncredited
1959	The Captain's Table	Maude Pritchett	
1959	Carry On Nurse	Student Nurse Stella Dawson	
1959	Life in Emergency Ward 10	Mrs. Pryor	
1959	Carry On Teacher	Sarah Allcock	
1959	Upstairs and Downstairs	Blodwen	
1959	Please Turn Over	Beryl	
1960	Carry On Constable	WPC. Gloria Passworthy	
1960	Doctor in Love	Dawn	
1960	Watch Your Stern	Anne Foster	
1961	His and Hers	Hortense	
1961	Carry On Regardless	Lily Duveen	
1961	Mr. Topaze	Colette	
1961	No My Darling Daughter	Second Typist	
1962	A Pair of Briefs	Gale Tornado	
1962	Twice Round the Daffodils	Harriet Halfpenny	
1962	The Iron Maiden	Nellie Carter	
1963	Nurse on Wheels	Deborah Walcott	
1964	Strictly for the Birds	Peggy Blessing	
1964	Carry On Cleo	Calpurnia	
1965	San Ferry Ann	Mum	
1965	The Big Job	Mildred Gamely	
1965	Carry On Cowboy	Belle Armitage	
1966	Doctor in Clover	Matron Sweet	
1966	Carry On Screaming!	Emily Bung	
1966	Don't Lose Your Head	Désirée Dubarry	
1967	Follow That Camel	Zig-Zig	
1967	Carry On Doctor	Chloë Gibson	
1968	Carry On Up the Khyber	Lady Ruff-Diamond	
1969	Carry On Camping	Joan Fussey	
1969	Carry On Again Doctor	Ellen Moore	
1970	Carry On Up the Jungle	Lady Evelyn Bagley	
1970	Doctor in Trouble	Russian Captain	
1970	Carry On Loving	Esme Crowfoot	
1971	Carry On Henry	Queen Marie	
1971	The Magnificent Seven Deadly Sins	Policewoman	(segment "Avarice")
1971	Carry On at Your Convenience	Chloë Moore	
1972	Carry On Matron	Mrs. Tidey	
1972	The Alf Garnett Saga	Gran	
1972	Carry On Abroad	Cora Flange	
1973	Not Now Darling	Miss Tipdale	
1973	Carry On Girls	Connie Philpotts	
1974	Don't Just Lie There, Say Something!	Birdie aka Lady 'Birdie' Mainwaring-Brown	
1974	Carry On Dick	Madame Desirée	
1975	One of Our Dinosaurs Is Missing	Emily	
1975	Carry On Behind	Daphne Barnes	
1976	Carry On England	Private Jennifer Ffoukes-Sharpe	
1978	Carry On Emmannuelle	Mrs. Dangle	
1990	The Fool	Lady Daphne	
1993	The Thief and the Cobbler	Mad and Holy Old Witch	Voice

=== Television ===
Year	Title	Role	Notes
1951	John of the Fair	Parlourmaid	TV movie
1953	Hurrah for Halloween	Mrs. Grouse	TV movie
1955	Curtains for Harry	Uncredited	TV movie
1955	BBC Sunday-Night Theatre	Audrey Fraser	Episode: The Makepeace Story #4: The New Executive
1955	London Playhouse	Daffy Lovell	Episode: The General's Mess
1955-1956	Here and Now	Uncredited	7 episodes
1956	The Adventures of Robin Hood	Nell	Episode: The Sheriff's Boots
1956	Colonel March of Scotland Yard	Marjorie Dawson	Episode: Hot Money
1956	Frankie Howerd	Various Characters	Episode 2
1956	ITV Play of the Week	Eva	Episode: Traveller's Joy
1956-1957	The Buccaneers	Abigail	2 episodes
1957	ITV Play of the Week	Phyllis	Episode: Accolade
1960	ITV Television Playhouse	Beatrice	Episode: A Holiday Abroad
1960	Our House	Daisy Burke	13 episodes
1960	Alice Through the Looking Box	Chambermaid	TV movie
1961	BBC Sunday-Night Play	Mavis Hunter	Episode: Off Centre
1962	Hugh and I	Uncredited	It's a Dog's Life
1962	Dial RIX	Shirley Rix	Episode: Nose to Wheel
1963	Dial RIX	Rita Haythorne	Episode: Come Prancing
1963	A Touch of the Sun	Uncredited	TV movie
1963	The Stanley Baxter Show	Uncredited	1 Episode
1963	A Christmas Night with the Stars	Various	1 Episode
1963-1964	The Dick Emery Show	Uncredited	14 episodes
1964	The Benny Hill Show	Guest	1 Episode
1965	Thirty-Minute Theatre	Jill Watson	Episode: Love in Triplicate
1966	Comedy Playhouse	Isabel 'Is' Conway	Episode: Seven Year Hitch
1967	ITV Play of the Week	Beryl Cockburn	Episode: That Old Black Magic
1967	Sam and Janet	Janet Marshall	6 episodes
1967	Before the Fringe	Uncredited	2 episodes
1967-1975	Till Death Us Do Part	Gran	13 episodes
1968	Beryl Reid Says Good Evening	Freda	1 Episode
1968	Iolanthe	The Fairy Queen	TV movie
1968-1969	According to Dora	Various	4 episodes
1969	The Jimmy Logan Show	Uncredited	1 Episode
1969	The Very Merry Widow and How	Station Announcer	Episode: How About Going Into Transports of Delight?
1970	The Kenneth Williams Show	Uncredited	1 Episode
1970	Tarbuck's Luck	Uncredited	1 Episode
1971	Six Dates with Barker	Kitty Harriman	Episode: The Odd Job
1971	Decimal Five	Uncredited	Voice
1971	Father, Dear Father	Miss Armitage	Episode: A Domestic Comedy
1971	A Christmas Carol	Mrs. Cratchit	Voice
1971	The Goodies	Delia Capone	Episode: Wicked Waltzing
1972	Jackanory Playhouse	Sycamore	Episode: The Wednesday Wand
1972	Carry on Christmas: Carry on Stuffing	Lady Rhoda Cockhorse; Miss Esmerelda; Princess Yo-Yo; Clodhopper's Mother-in-Law	TV movie
1972-1978	Sykes	Madge Kettlewell	5 episodes
1973	The Cobblers of Umbridge	Lilian Beverly; Carol Begorrah; Norah Pepper; Voice of Doris	TV movie
1973	The Goodies	Matron	Episode: Way Outward Bound
1973	7 of 1	Mrs. Dawkins	Episode: One Man's Meat
1973	Ooh La La!	Amandine	Episode: A Pig in a Poke
1973	Carry on Christmas	Virginia's Mother; Senna Pod; Bishop's Wife; Adelle; 6th Ballerina; Salvation Army Collector; Maid Marion; Traffic Warden	TV movie
1973-1974	Men of Affairs	Lady Mainwaring-Brown	4 episodes
1975	Love Among the Ruins	Fanny Pratt	TV movie
1975	A Journey to London	Lady Headpiece	TV movie
1975	Carry on Laughing!	Mrs. Breeches; Dr. Janis Crunbitt; Lady Guinevere; Mrs. MacFlute; Amelia Forbush; Else; Lady Kate; Lady Isobel; Madame Olga	2 episodes 1 Episode; 2 episodes 1 Episode; 1 Episode; 1 Episode; 1 Episode; 1 Episode; 1 Episode
1976	The Two Ronnies	Dowager Duchess of Arc	1 Episode
1976	The Howerd Confessions	Mrs. Beachum; The Matron; Nellie	1 Episode; 1 Episode; 1 Episode
1976	East Lynne	Joyce (servant)	TV movie
1977	Lord Tramp	Miss Pratt	6 episodes
1978-1980	Born and Bred	Molly Peglar	
1979	In Loving Memory	Annie Potter	Episode: Pork
1979-1980	Worzel Gummidge	Mrs. Bloomsbury-Barton	8 episodes
1980	Dick Turpin	Countess of Durham	Episode: The Godmother
1980	Lady Killers	Amelia Elizabeth Dyer	Episode: Suffer Little Children
1981	Lady Killers	'Belle' Elmore	Episode: Miss Elmore
1982	Educating Marmalade	Signora Bandolini	Episode: Marmalade in Venice
1983	Crown Court	Maureen Vairey	Episode: Night Fever: Part 1
1983	Hallelujah!	Ella Scratchitt	Episode: A Goose for Mrs. Scratchitt
1983	Waters of the Moon	Mrs. Ashworth	TV movie
1984	Cockles	Gloria du Bois	1 Episode
1984	Dramarama	Beryl	Episode: Fowl Pest
1984	Poor Little Rich Girls	Madge Henshawe	Episode: Rainbows
1984	Hay Fever	Clara	TV movie
1984-1987	Tickle on the Tum	Connie Caper	8 episodes
1985	Agatha Christie's Miss Marple: A Murder Is Announced	Miss Murgatroyd	TV mini-series
1985	Deceptions	Mrs. Thirkell	TV movie
1986	In Loving Memory	Annie Potter; Hilda Pardoe	Episode: The Second Time Around; Episode: King of the Mountains
1986	Doctor Who	Katryca	4 episodes
1986-1987	Farrington of the F.O.	Annie Begley	14 episodes
1987	Drummonds	Mrs. Fordham	Episode: Fathers and Sons
1987	Super Gran	Cat Burglar	Episode: Supergran Snookered
1987	Only Fools and Horses	Auntie Reenie Turpin	Episode: The Frog's Legacy
1987-1988	Simon and the Witch	Lady Fox-Custard	23 episodes
1989	Victoria Wood	Susan	Episode: Val De Ree (Ha Ha Ha Ha Ha)
1990	Cluedo	Mrs. White (II)	Episode: Christmas Past, Christmas Present
1990-1992	On the Up	Mrs. Fiona Wembley	19 episodes
1991	Tonight at 8.30	Mrs Rockett	Episode: Fumed Oak
1992	Boys from the Bush	Grace	3 episodes
1993	Screen One	Daisy Potter	Episode: Tender Loving Care
1993	One Foot in the Grave	Lady on Plane	Episode: One Foot in the Algarve
1994	Smokescreen	Mrs. Nash	6 episodes
1994	Martin Chuzzlewit	Betsy Prig	3 episodes
1994-1998	As Time Goes By	Madge	9 episodes
1995	Pie in the Sky	Harriet Coverly	Episode: The Mild Bunch
1995	Just William	Mrs. Miggs	Episode: William Clears the Slums
1995-1996	My Good Friend	Miss Byron	3 episodes
1996	The Canterville Ghost	Mrs. Umney	TV movie
1997	Hetty Wainthropp Investigates	Adele McCarthy	Episode: A Rose by Any Other Name
1997	Spark	Aunt Hattie	Episode: Fourth Cousin Kimberley
2000	The Last of the Blonde Bombshells	Betty	TV movie, (final film role)

=== Video games ===
Year	Title	Role	Notes
1994	Cluedo	Mrs. Blanche White	
