= Anthony Sagar =

English actor (1920–1973)

Anthony Sagar as the Drill Sergeant in the Dad's Army episode Room at the Bottom (1969)

Anthony Sagar (19 June 1920 – 24 January 1973) was an English character actor and a member of the National Theatre. He was prolific screen performer and appeared in many films (including seven of the Carry On series) and television series including the 1959 adaptation of The Moonstone, Steptoe and Son, The Avengers and Dad's Army.

== Career ==
James Anthony Sagar was born in Burnley, Lancashire and his early career was largely in film and stage. His first television role, in Dixon of Dock Green, came at the age of 36. He stayed with police dramas, appearing in Z-Cars, Special Branch and New Scotland Yard. Other television roles included Ernie Kidd in Swallows and Amazons (1963), Sergeant Harris in Doomwatch (1970) and Parker in Spyder's Web (1972), as well as appearances in The Avengers (1969) and Randall and Hopkirk (Deceased) (1969).

In addition to appearing in seven Carry On films he also appeared as a coxswain in Barnacle Bill (1957), a customs official in Law and Disorder (1958), the Sergeant of the Guards in I Was Monty's Double (1958), an instructor's assistant in The Bulldog Breed (1960), a drunk in The Loneliness of the Long Distance Runner (1962) and Hill in The Offence (1972).

Theatre appearances included The Hollow at the Grand Theatre, Wolverhampton (1953), The Gay Dog at the Grand Theatre, Wolverhampton (1954), Joe in The Ring of Truth at the Savoy Theatre (1959), There's a Girl in My Soup at the Golders Green Hippodrome (1966), and Percy Elliott in Epitaph for George Dillon for the National Theatre at the Young Vic (1971).

In TV comedy he appeared in Steptoe and Son as George in the episode Full House in 1963, and appeared in two episodes of the BBC sitcom Dad's Army – as Drill Sergeant Gregory in Room at the Bottom (1969) and as the Sergeant Major in Fallen Idol (1970); he also played a Police Sergeant in the series' film version.

He died of a heart attack in Kensington in London on 24 January 1973 aged 52.

== Selected filmography ==
- Sailor Beware! (1956) – Naval Rating (uncredited)
- X the Unknown (1956) – Gateman (uncredited)
- Miracle in Soho (1957) – Billy (uncredited)
- The Birthday Present (1957) – 1st Reception Officer (uncredited)
- The One That Got Away (1957) – Cook – Kent (uncredited)
- Barnacle Bill (1957) – Coxswain
- Law and Disorder (1958) – Customs Official
- Next to No Time (1958) – Ellis
- Carry On Sergeant (1958) – Stores Sergeant
- Chain of Events (1958) – Drunk
- I Was Monty's Double (1958) – Guard Sergeant (Villa)
- Carry On Nurse (1959) – First Ambulance Man
- The 39 Steps (1959) – Demolition Workman (uncredited)
- Jack the Ripper (1959) – Drunk at Murder Scene
- Please Turn Over (1960) – Barman
- Carry On Constable (1960) – Angry Customer (uncredited)
- The Bulldog Breed (1960) – Instructor's Assistant (uncredited)
- Carry On Regardless (1961) – Bus Conductor
- A Pair of Briefs (1962) – Hotel Meat Porter (uncredited)
- Carry On Cruising (1962) – Cook
- The Loneliness of the Long Distance Runner (1962) – Fenton (uncredited)
- The Early Bird (1965) – Fireman (uncredited)
- Carry On Screaming! (1966) – Policeman
- Who-Dun-It - Inspector White
- Some Will, Some Won't (1970) – Policeman in Court (uncredited)
- Carry On Loving (1970) – Man in Hospital
- Carry On Henry (1971) – Heckler (scenes deleted)
- Dad's Army (1971) – Police Sergeant
- Villain (1971) – Danny
- The Offence (1972) – Hill
- That's Your Funeral (1972) – Policeman (Crematorium)
- Our Miss Fred (1972) – R.S.M.
