= Gail Grainger =

British actress (born 1950)

- Born: 17 September 1950 (age 75); Chelsea, London, England
- Years active: 1971–1980

Gail Grainger (born 17 September 1950) is an English actress best remembered for her role as Moira Plunkett, a travel courier, in the 1972 comedy film Carry On Abroad.

== Background ==
Gail Grainger was born in Chelsea, London. She took up dancing at the age of six and studied at a theatrical school. She had television roles in her teens in the BBC's production of Gilbert and Sullivan's Iolanthe and in ATV's soap opera Crossroads.

== Carry on Abroad ==
In Carry On Abroad (1972), Gail played Miss Moira Plunkett, an assistant to tour courier Stuart Farquhar (Kenneth Williams), a character type often played by Valerie Leon in Carry On films of the late 60s/early 70s. The couriers led a party that included Sid James, Joan Sims, Charles Hawtrey, Barbara Windsor, Kenneth Connor, June Whitfield, Sally Geeson, Carol Hawkins and Bernard Bresslaw on a weekend trip to the Spanish holiday resort of Elsbels. Her phlegmatic and slightly bemused approach to a series of disastrous situations culminated in her extricating the party from a foreign jail by making advances to the local police chief.

== Other roles ==
On stage, Gail played three parts - a fantasy maid, a nurse and a member of a female gang led by Kate O'Mara as Madame Gerda – in a 1971 play entitled Dead Duck produced by Leslie Phillips, based on the television series The Avengers. This was first performed in Birmingham and later at the Prince of Wales Theatre in London. She subsequently appeared with Leslie Phillips, and under his direction, in Joyce Rayburn's comedy The Man Most Likely To ..., both at the Duke of York's Theatre in London and on a world tour. The Man Most Likely To ... opened initially at the Vaudeville Theatre on 4 July 1968, and ran for over 1,000 performances in London.

She also appeared in episodes of a number of television series, including Casanova '73 (also with Leslie Phillips, 1973), Warship (as Heather Gardiner in the episode "The Man from the Sea", 1974), The Sweeney (as Carter's girlfriend Jill in the episode "Sweet Smell of Succession", 1976), Butterflies (1979) and Rings on Their Fingers (1980). Her last film role to date was as Consuela in the Joe Lewis action film Jaguar Lives! (1979).
