= A Touch of the Sun =

A Touch of the Sun may refer to:

- A Touch of the Sun (1956 film), a British comedy directed by Gordon Parry
- A Touch of the Sun (1963 film), a television film featuring Joan Sims
- A Touch of the Sun (1979 film), a British-American comedy directed by Peter Curran
- A Touch of the Sun (play), 1958, by N. C. Hunter
