= Rosalind Knight =

English actress (1933–2020)

- Knight in Carry On Teacher in 1959
- Born: 3 December 1933; London, England
- Died: 19 December 2020 (aged 87); London, England
- Education: Old Vic Theatre School
- Occupation: Actress
- Years active: 1950–2020
- Spouse: Michael Elliott (m. 1959; died 1984)
- Children: 2, including Marianne
- Father: Esmond Knight

Rosalind Marie Elliott (née Knight; 3 December 1933 – 19 December 2020) was an English actress. Her career spanned 70 years on stage, screen, and television. Her film appearances include Blue Murder at St Trinian's (1957), Carry On Nurse (1959), Carry On Teacher (1959), Tom Jones (1963), and About a Boy (2002). Among her TV roles were playing Beryl in the BBC sitcom Gimme Gimme Gimme (1999–2001) and Cynthia Goodman ("Horrible Grandma") in Friday Night Dinner (2012, 2016–2020).

== Career ==
Knight was born in St John's Wood, London. She was the daughter of actor Esmond Knight and his first wife, Frances Clare, and the stepdaughter of actress Nora Swinburne. Being from a theatrical family, she was introduced to theatre at an early age. She was inspired by a visit to the bombed-out Old Vic Theatre in 1949 with her father to see performances of The Snow Queen and As You Like It. After studying in the theatre school there for two years, under Glen Byam Shaw, George Devine and Michel Saint-Denis, she was offered a position as Assistant Stage Manager at the Midland Theatre Company in Coventry. From Coventry, she moved to Ipswich Repertory Company, where Joe Orton was a fellow ASM.

Two years later, she joined a touring group, the West of England Theatre Company, for an eight-month stint. She was spotted by a producer, which led to her being cast as a schoolgirl in Blue Murder at St Trinian's (1957). That same year, she starred with her father, playing father and daughter, in the BBC production of Nicholas Nickleby. An earlier film role, albeit uncredited, was as a lady-in-waiting in Laurence Olivier's film Richard III (1955), which also featured her father.

In the late 1950s, Knight appeared in the BBC Radio comedy series Ray's a Laugh. During this period, she also performed in two early Carry On films. In Carry On Nurse (1959), she played Nurse Nightingale and in Carry On Teacher (also 1959), she played Felicity Wheeler, a prim school inspector whose amorous hopes toward Kenneth Connor's wimpy science master are continually thwarted. In 1963, she played Mrs Fitzpatrick in the film of Tom Jones and was in a second St Trinian's film, playing a teacher in The Wildcats of St Trinian's in 1980.

She made numerous appearances on television, in shows such as Coronation Street (1981), Sherlock Holmes (1984), Mapp & Lucia (1985), Only Fools and Horses (1989), Agatha Christie's Poirot (1992), Jeeves and Wooster (1993), The Upper Hand (1995), Wycliffe (1996), Dalziel and Pascoe (1999), Heartbeat (2000), Casualty (2002), Midsomer Murders (2003 and 2011), Doctors (2005 and 2009), Agatha Christie's Marple (2006), Holby City (2008 and 2015), Sherlock (2012) and Friday Night Dinner (2012, 2016, 2018, and 2020). From 1999 to 2001, she co-starred in the sitcom Gimme Gimme Gimme, playing a retired prostitute and featuring in the series with Kathy Burke and James Dreyfus.

Her other films include Prick Up Your Ears (1987) and About a Boy (2002). Throughout her career, Knight continued to work in the theatre, including with the Royal Shakespeare Company, the Royal Court Theatre and The Old Vic. She also worked at the Royal Exchange, Manchester, Nottingham Playhouse and the Crucible Theatre in Sheffield.

== Personal life and death ==
Knight married theatre and television director Michael Elliott in July 1959; the couple remained married until his death in 1984. They had two daughters including Marianne Elliott, a theatre director who is married to actor Nick Sidi, and actress Susannah Elliott.

Knight died from breast cancer and pancreatic cancer at Meadow House Hospice in Ealing Hospital on 19 December 2020, at the age of 87.

== Selected credits ==
=== Film and television ===
- Gone to Earth (1950) – Young Girl at Racecourse (uncredited)
- Richard III (1955) – Lady-in-Waiting (uncredited)
- Fortune Is a Woman (1957) (uncredited)
- Blue Murder at St Trinian's (1957) – Annabel
- The Horse's Mouth (1958) (uncredited)
- Carry On Nurse (1959) – Student Nurse Nightingale
- Carry On Teacher (1959) – Felicity Wheeler
- Doctor in Love (1960) – Doctor (uncredited)
- There Was a Crooked Man (1960) – Nurse
- The Kitchen (1961) – 17th Waitress
- Tom Jones (1963) – Mrs. Fitzpatrick
- Buddenbrooks (1965) – Pfiffi
- Jackanory (1966–1967) – Storyteller
- Can Heironymus Merkin Ever Forget Mercy Humppe and Find True Happiness? (1969) – Critic Penelope
- Start the Revolution Without Me (1970) – Helene de Sisi
- Eskimo Nell (1975) – Lady Longhorn
- Mister Quilp (1975) – Mrs. George
- The Lady Vanishes (1979) – Evelyn Barnes
- The Wildcats of St Trinian's (1980) – Miss Walsh
- Coronation Street (1981, TV series) – Mrs Ramsden
- Nancy Astor (1982, TV series) – Margot Asquith
- Prick Up Your Ears (1987) – RADA Judge
- Only Fools and Horses (1989, TV series) – Mrs Creswell
- Watching (1990, TV series) – Mrs. Lloyd-Roberts
- Afraid of the Dark (1991) – Edith
- The Blackheath Poisonings (1992, TV series) – Lady Reading Poetry
- Agatha Christie's Poirot (TV series, 1992) - Georgina Morley in "One, Two, Buckle My Shoe"
- Gunslinger's Revenge (1998) – Mrs Willow
- Tess of the D'Urbervilles (1998, TV movie) — Mrs D'Urberville
- Gimme Gimme Gimme (1999–2001, TV series) – Beryl
- About a Boy (2002) – Lindsey's Mother
- Midsomer Murders (2003, TV series) - Eleanor McPherson in "Birds of Prey"
- Agatha Christie's Marple (TV series, 2006) - Partridge in "The Moving Finger"
- Demons Never Die (2011) – Freida
- Midsomer Murders (2011, TV series) - Mother Gerome in "A Sacred Trust"
- Friday Night Dinner (2012, 2016, 2018, 2020, TV series) – Cynthia Goodman (also known as "Horrible Grandma")
- The Lady in the Van (2015) – Old Nun
- The Crown (2016, TV series) – Princess Alice of Battenberg

=== Theatre ===
- Mrs. Prentice in What the Butler Saw by Joe Orton. Directed by Braham Murray at the Royal Exchange, Manchester. (1977)
- Miss Erikson in Present Laughter by Noël Coward. Directed by James Maxwell at the Royal Exchange, Manchester. (1977)
- Stepmother in Cinderella by Trevor Peacock. World Premiere directed by Anthony Bowles and Michele Hardy at the Royal Exchange, Manchester. (1979)
- Mrs. Rankling in The Schoolmistress by Arthur Wing Pinero. Directed by James Maxwell at the Royal Exchange, Manchester. (1979)
- Madam in Blood, Black and Gold by Gerard McLarnon. World premiere directed by Braham Murray at the Royal Exchange, Manchester. (1980)
- Mrs. Jike in Love on the Dole by Ronald Gow. Directed by Eric Thompson at the Royal Exchange, Manchester. (1980)
- Lady Windermere in Lord Arthur Saville's Crime by Oscar Wilde. Directed by Eric Thompson at the Royal Exchange, Manchester. (1982)
- Lady India in Ring Round the Moon by Jean Anouilh. Directed by Steven Pimlott at the Royal Exchange, Manchester. (1983)
- Mrs. Thorn in Class K by Trevor Peacock at the Royal Exchange, Manchester. (1985)
- Olympia in A Flea in Her Ear by Georges Feydeau (translated by John Mortimer). Directed by Richard Jones at the Old Vic, London. (1989)
- Anya Pavlikov in Nude With Violin by Noël Coward. Directed by Marianne Elliott at the Royal Exchange, Manchester. (1999)
