= Carry On Abroad =

1972 British comedy film by Gerald Thomas

- Original UK quad poster
- Directed by: Gerald Thomas
- Written by: Talbot Rothwell
- Produced by: Peter Rogers
- Starring: Sid James; Kenneth Williams; Charles Hawtrey; Joan Sims; Bernard Bresslaw; Barbara Windsor; Kenneth Connor; Peter Butterworth; Jimmy Logan; June Whitfield; Hattie Jacques
- Cinematography: Alan Hume
- Edited by: Alfred Roome
- Music by: Eric Rogers
- Distributed by: The Rank Organisation
- Release date: 15 December 1972
- Running time: 88 minutes
- Country: United Kingdom
- Language: English
- Budget: £225,000

Carry On Abroad is a 1972 British comedy film directed by Gerald Thomas, the 24th release in the series of 31 Carry On films (1958–1992). The film features series regulars Sid James, Kenneth Williams, Joan Sims, Bernard Bresslaw, Barbara Windsor, Kenneth Connor, Peter Butterworth and Hattie Jacques. It was the 23rd and final Carry On appearance for Charles Hawtrey. June Whitfield returned after appearing in Carry On Nurse 13 years earlier. Jimmy Logan and Carol Hawkins made their first of two appearances in the series.

Along with the previous film in the series (Carry On Matron), it features the highest number of the regular Carry On team, and surpasses that if Terry Scott is included, who filmed a scene as an irate Wundatours customer; his scene was cut from the final film. The only other member missing is Jim Dale, who had left the series by this point, but would return for Carry On Columbus in 1992. The film was followed by Carry On Girls in 1973.

== Plot ==
Pub landlord and frequent holidaymaker Vic Flange flirts with the young widow Sadie Tompkins as his wife, Cora, looks on with disdain. Their friend Harry, who is prone to violent twitches, arrives and reveals that the package holiday Vic has booked to the Mediterranean island Elsbels, (Note: A pun on the slang expression "Hell's Bells".) which is on the Costa Bomm, also includes Sadie, much to Cora's outrage. Cora, who avoids holidays because she hates flying, nevertheless decides to accompany Vic on the trip to ensure he keeps away from Sadie.

The next day, Stuart Farquhar, the representative of Wundatours Travel Agency, and his assistant, Moira Plunkett, welcome the passengers. Among them are the sex-starved Stanley Blunt and his prudish, domineering wife Evelyn; drunken mummy's boy Eustace Tuttle; handsome Nicholas and his possessive gay friend Robin; Scotsman Bert Conway; beautiful friends Lily and Marge, who are each hoping to find a man to fall in love with; and a group of 12 monks, including Brother Bernard, who is having difficulty fitting into his new life.

Upon their arrival, they discover their hotel is only half-finished; the builders have quit, leaving the remaining five floors uncompleted. Distraught manager Pepe tries to run the place in different guises – the manager, the doorman and the porter – and the chef is his wife Floella, who battles repeatedly with the stove while their son Georgio idles behind the bar. The hotel also hides various faults, and Pepe is overrun with complaints: Evelyn finds Mr Tuttle in her bath; Vic discovers Sadie naked in his shower; Lily and Marge's wardrobe has no back to it, allowing them to be accidentally seen by Brother Bernard in the opposite room; sand pours out of Moira's taps; Robin and Nicholas's drawers have no bottom; and the lavatory drenches Bert. The sudden influx of angry complaints causes the phone system at the front desk to combust.

That night, the guests get more acquainted with each other before dinner, which consists of an unimaginative Brown Windsor soup starter. Before the main meal can be served, Pepe and Floella argue over the stove, causing him to throw wine, which he mistakes for methylated spirits, into it. The stove, in turn, kicks out enormous quantities of smoke, which spills out into the restaurant and forces the holiday-makers to open the windows, prompting the arrival of mosquitos. Although agreeing to play leapfrog with Tuttle, Lily and Marge have their eyes on other things. Marge takes a shine to Brother Bernard, and they develop a romance, which is constantly hampered by Bernard's faith and generally clumsy behaviour, while Lily lures Nicholas away from a jealous Robin. Meanwhile, Stanley attempts to seduce Cora whilst his wife is not present. However, Cora is more interested in keeping Vic away from Sadie, who grows fond of Bert. Vic tries to put Bert off Sadie by saying that she is a black widow who murdered her two previous husbands, when actually both were firemen who died on the job.

The next day, the holidaymakers are awakened early in the morning by the builders, who returned to work. While most of the party go off on an excursion to the nearby village, Stanley ensures Evelyn is left behind so that he can spend the day attempting to woo Cora. Vic samples a local drink, "Santa Cecilia’s Elixir", which blesses the drinker with X-ray vision, and he manages to see through women's clothing. However, the tourists are arrested for causing a riot at Madame Fifi's brothel after Vic, Bert and Eustace annoy the girls there. Unaware of the tourists' arrest, Evelyn is seduced by Georgio, which leads to her abandoning her frigid behaviour.

In prison, Miss Plunkett seduces the Chief of Police, and the tourists are released out of gratitude. At the hotel, Evelyn, having had an affair with Georgio, awakens her sex life with a surprised Stanley. On their last night in the hotel all the guests are at ease with each other, thanks to the punch being spiked with Santa Cecelia's Elixir. Midway through the night, however, it begins to rain, and the hotel is revealed to have been constructed on a dry river bed as the foundations start to crumble. Pepe loses his patience (and his sanity) with the guests who, now intoxicated from the spiked punch, party on - completely oblivious that the hotel is disintegrating around them. The holiday ends with Pepe yelling for the guests to abandon the hotel as it collapses.

Some time later, an Elsbels reunion at Vic and Cora's pub is held. Farquhar has lost his job at Wundatours and now works at the pub. All the guests are happy, and reminisce about the holiday they barely enjoyed.

== Cast ==
- Sid James as Vic Flange
- Kenneth Williams as Stuart Farquhar
- Charles Hawtrey as Eustace Tuttle
- Joan Sims as Cora Flange
- Peter Butterworth as Pepe
- Kenneth Connor as Stanley Blunt
- June Whitfield as Evelyn Blunt
- Bernard Bresslaw as Brother Bernard
- Barbara Windsor as Sadie Tomkins
- Gail Grainger as Moira Plunkett
- Jimmy Logan as Bert Conway
- Sally Geeson as Lily Maggs (Note: Kenneth Williams's character refers to her as "Miss Maggs".)
- Carol Hawkins as Marge Dawes (Note: Kenneth Williams's character refers to her as "Miss Dawes".)
- Derek Francis as Brother Martin
- Ray Brooks as Georgio
- John Clive as Robin Tweet
- David Kernan as Nicholas Phipps
- Hattie Jacques as Floella
- Patsy Rowlands as Miss Dobbs
- Jack Douglas as Harry
- Amelia Bayntun as Mrs Tuttle
- Alan Curtis as police chief
- Olga Lowe as Madame Fifi
- Brian Osborne as stall-holder
- Hugh Futcher as gaoler
- Gertan Klauber as postcard seller

== Crew ==
- Screenplay – Talbot Rothwell
- Music – Eric Rogers
- Production manager – Jack Swinburne
- Art director – Lionel Couch
- Editor – Alfred Roome
- Director of photography – Alan Hume
- Camera operator – Jimmy Davis
- Continuity – Joy Mercer
- Assistant director – David Bracknell
- Sound recordists – Taffy Haines & Ken Barker
- Make-up – Geoffrey Rodway
- Assistant art director – Bill Bennison
- Set dresser – Don Picton
- Hairdresser – Stella Rivers
- Costume designer – Courtenay Elliott
- Dubbing editor – Peter Best
- Assistant editor – Jack Gardner
- Titles – GSE Ltd
- Processor – Rank Film Laboratories
- Producer – Peter Rogers
- Director – Gerald Thomas

The film's opening credits also include 'Sun Tan Lo Tion' (sun tan lotion) as 'Technical Director'.

== Production ==
=== Casting ===
The brothel keeper is played by Olga Lowe, one of the first actresses to work with Sid James when he arrived in the UK in 1946. Lowe was also the actress on stage with James on the night he died in Sunderland.

Madeline Smith was offered the role of Lily Maggs.

This was Charles Hawtrey's final 'Carry On' film as well as the final cinematic film of his career; his alcoholism had grown out of control and he was fired as the crew's patience had finally run out. His character Eustace Tuttle was a mother-dominated alcoholic; screenwriter Talbot Rothwell was deliberately satirising Hawtrey's own personal life.

Hattie Jacques has only four minutes of screen time. Due to her deteriorating health, insurers were reluctant to insure her on set. She filmed her scenes in just one week.

=== Filming and locations ===
Filming dates were 17 April–26 May 1972. The previous entry, Carry On Matron, was released during filming.

Interior/exterior film locations were:

- Bagshot, Surrey: the road to the airport.
- High Street, Slough: The Wundatours travel agency shop (the site has since been redeveloped and is now Cornwall House).
- Pinewood Studios: Elsbels airport terminal building (the studios' security block); the Whippit Inn pub; Elsbels hotel interior and exterior scenes. The hotel was constructed in the studio backlot with a matte added to represent the upper floors and sections of scaffold.

== Reception ==
The Monthly Film Bulletin wrote: "'Please, Miss Plunkett, you're squashing my itinerary', squeals Kenneth Williams' camp courier early on in this latest, and thoroughly representative addition to Peter Rogers' unflagging Carry On... series. Travelling well-trodden paths of slapstick, double entendre and nudging innuendo, the itinerary this time whisks the team off on an ill-fated package holiday to the island of 'Elsbels'. Foreign language difficulties provide Talbot Rothwell with ample scope to indulge his weakness for puns (enunciating his name, 'Stuart Farquhar' for the Spanish hotelier, Kenneth Williams gets the predictable come-back, 'Stupid what?'), while the men's discovery of a magical aphrodisiac at the local market leads the team to their usual frenzied and bosom-fixated skirmishes with sex."
