= Norman Rossington =

British actor (1928–1999)

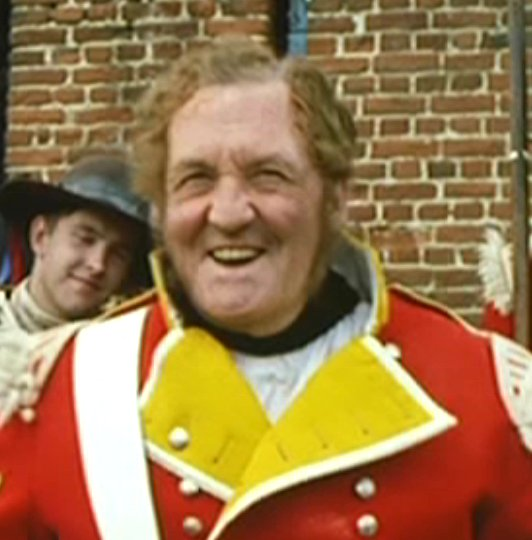
- Norman Rossington in Sharpe's Regiment (1996)
- Born: 24 December 1928; Liverpool, England
- Died: 21 May 1999 (aged 70); Manchester, England
- Years active: 1956–1996
- Spouse: Cindy Barnes (m. 1999)

Norman Rossington (24 December 1928 – 21 May 1999) was an English actor best remembered for his roles in The Army Game, the Carry On films and the Beatles' film A Hard Day's Night.

== Early life ==
Born in Liverpool, Lancashire, the son of a publican, Rossington was educated at Sefton Park Elementary School and Liverpool Technical College. He left education at the age of 14. After that he lived a rather aimless adolescent life as messenger, office boy at Liverpool Docks and apprentice joiner. He did his national service in the RAF. Later, he went to night school and studied industrial design at technical college to become a draughtsman. His interest in acting led him to the David Lewis Theatre, a local theatre group where he began his acting career. Here he played Shakespeare and in The Critic under the direction of Thomas G Reed. Rossington went on to train at the Bristol Old Vic Theatre School, by the mid-1950s appearing on the stage in plays such as a London Old Vic tour of the US in A Midsummer Night's Dream and Salad Days, being one of the original cast. However, his big breakthrough came in 1957, when he starred as Private 'Cupcake' Cook in the popular sitcom The Army Game. He left after three series in 1959, and in the meantime had appeared in its big screen spin-off I Only Arsked!, again as 'Cupcake'.

== Film roles ==
His first film role was in the 1956 film Three Men in a Boat. Rossington went on to appear in Carry On Sergeant, the first Carry On film, as well as Carry On Nurse (1959) and Carry On Regardless (1961). Rossington also played notable serious roles in Saint Joan (1957) and the classic 1960 British "New Wave" film Saturday Night and Sunday Morning, playing alongside Albert Finney in the latter's first starring role. In 1958 he acted in the first of two Titanic films, A Night to Remember, as a steward unable to communicate with non-English speaking passengers. Rossington would return in his second Titanic film playing the Sergeant-at-Arms in S.O.S. Titanic in 1979.

In 1962 Rossington played the uncredited role of Corporal Jenkins in Lawrence of Arabia, and later appeared in The Longest Day (1962), Those Magnificent Men in Their Flying Machines (1965), Tobruk playing Alfie (1967) and The Charge of the Light Brigade (1968). In 1972, he appeared in Young Winston and the cult horror film Death Line with Donald Pleasence.

Rossington is the only performer to work in both a Beatles film, in A Hard Day's Night, and an Elvis Presley film, Double Trouble. He remembered Presley during filming as a 'quiet man who sat by himself in a corner and who would often borrow my newspaper.'

== Television career ==
From the 1970s onwards, Rossington mainly appeared on television, including roles in His and Hers, The Wednesday Play, Casanova, Carry On Christmas, Crown Court, I, Claudius, Z-Cars, Budgie, Big Jim and the Figaro Club (1981, in the title role of "Big Jim"), The Bill and Last of the Summer Wine. He also told the stories from The Adventures of Portland Bill. His final appearances before his death were Heartbeat in 1996, Sharpe's Regiment as Sergeant Horatio Havercamp, also in 1996, and What's a Carry On? in 1998.

== Theatre ==
His stage career included time spent with the Royal Shakespeare Company and at the Metropolitan Opera in New York. Rossington also made many appearances in the West End, with roles in Peter Pan, My Fair Lady (as Alfred Doolittle), Annie Get Your Gun (as Charlie Davenport), Tony Weller in Pickwick: The Musical, Guys and Dolls (as Nathan Detroit), and in Beauty and the Beast (as Maurice).

== Radio ==
Rossington did some radio, returning to the part of Big Jim in the BBC Radio 4 version of Big Jim and the Figaro Club. He made six half-hour episodes in 1987.

== Personal life and death ==
Rossington gave his hobbies as woodwork, skiing, golf and languages. Early in his life, Rossington was married to an actress for three years and then divorced. His second marriage, on 19 January 1999 to Cindy Barnes, lasted until his death from cancer aged 70 a few months later.

== Selected filmography ==
- Keep It Clean (1956) as Arthur
- Three Men in a Boat (1956) as Boy Lover
- Saint Joan (1957) as 2nd Soldier at Burning (uncredited)
- The Long Haul (1957) as Young Liverpool Driver (uncredited)
- Strangers' Meeting (1957) as Barrow Boy
- The One That Got Away (1957) as Sergeant - Swanick (uncredited)
- The Army Game (1957) Pte. 'Cupcake' Cook
- A Night to Remember (1958) as James Kieran - Titanic Chief Steerage Steward (uncredited)
- Carry On Sergeant (1958) as Herbert Brown
- I Only Arsked! (1958) as Pte. 'Cupcake' Cook
- Carry On Nurse (1959) as Norm
- The Running Jumping & Standing Still Film (1959) as Bearded Man (uncredited)
- The League of Gentlemen (1960) as Staff-Sergeant Hall (uncredited)
- Doctor in Love (1960) as Strip Club Doorman (uncredited)
- Saturday Night and Sunday Morning (1960) as Bert
- No Love for Johnnie (1961) as Sykes of the Herald (uncredited)
- Carry On Regardless (1961) as Referee
- Go to Blazes (1962) as Alfie
- Crooks Anonymous (1962) as Bert
- The Longest Day (1962) as Pte. Clough
- Lawrence of Arabia (1962) as Corporal Jenkins (uncredited)
- Nurse on Wheels (1963) as George Judd
- A Hard Day's Night (1964) as Norm
- The Comedy Man (1964) as Theodore Littleton
- Daylight Robbery (1964)
- Joey Boy (1965) as Royal Army Corporal (uncredited)
- Those Magnificent Men in Their Flying Machines (1965) as Assistant Fire Chief
- Cup Fever (1965) as Driver
- The Wrong Box (1966) as First Rough
- Tobruk (1967) as Private Alfie Braithwaite
- Double Trouble (1967) as Arthur Babcock
- To Chase a Million (1967)
- The Charge of the Light Brigade (1968) as S.M. Corbett
- Negatives (1968) as Auctioneer
- Two Gentlemen Sharing (1969) as Phil Carter
- The Adventures of Gerard (1970) as Sgt. Papilette (Hussars of Conflans)
- The Rise and Rise of Michael Rimmer (1970) as Guide at Porton Down
- Simon, Simon (1970) as Fireman
- Man in the Wilderness (1971) as Ferris
- Death Line (1972) as Detective Sergeant Rogers
- Young Winston (1972) as Dewsnap
- Go for a Take (1972) as Jack Foster
- Digby, the Biggest Dog in the World (1973) as Tom
- Joseph Andrews (1977) as Gaffer Andrews
- The Prisoner of Zenda (1979) as Bruno
- S.O.S. Titanic (1979) as Master-at-Arms: T. King
- Masada (1981) as Maro
- House of the Long Shadows (1983) as Station Master
- The Krays (1990) as Shopkeeper
- Let Him Have It (1991) as Postman

== Selected television roles ==
| Year | Title | Role | Notes |
|---|---|---|---|
| 1957–1959 | The Army Game | Private Cupcake Cook | |
| 1960–1962 | Our House | Gordon Brent | |
| 1967 | Hicks and Stokes | Billy Hicks | |
| 1969 | Curry and Chips | Norman | 6 episodes |
| 1970 | His and Hers | Roy Hooker | Episode: "Television" |
| 1970 | The Roads to Freedom | Pinette | 4 episodes |
| 1971 | Casanova | Lorenzo | |
| 1976 | I, Claudius | Sergeant of the Guard | |
| 1996 | Sharpe | Sergeant Horatio Havercamp | |
