= Jaguar Lives! =

1979 film by Ernest Pintoff

- Directed by: Ernest Pintoff
- Screenplay by: Yabo Yablonsky
- Produced by: Derek Gibson
- Starring: Christopher Lee; Donald Pleasence; Barbara Bach; Capucine; Joseph Wiseman; Woody Strode; John Huston; Joe Lewis
- Cinematography: John Cabrera
- Edited by: Angelo Ross
- Music by: Robert O. Ragland
- Production companies: Jaguar Productions, Ltd.
- Distributed by: American International Pictures
- Release date: August 31, 1979 (Los Angeles)
- Running time: 90 minutes
- Country: United States
- Language: English

Jaguar Lives! is a 1979 American action film directed by Ernest Pintoff and starring Joe Lewis, Christopher Lee, Donald Pleasence and Barbara Bach. Its plot follows a secret agent who battles an international drugs ring. Despite receiving top billing in the credits, stars such as Christopher Lee, Barbara Bach and Donald Pleasence barely feature in the narrative.

== Cast ==
- Joe Lewis as Jonathan "Jaguar" Cross
- Christopher Lee as Adam Caine
- Donald Pleasence as General Villanova
- Barbara Bach as Anna Thompson
- Capucine as Zina Vanacore
- Joseph Wiseman as Ben Ashir
- Woody Strode as Sensei
- John Huston as Ralph Richards
- Gabriel Melgar as Ahmed
- Anthony De Longis as Bret Barrett
- Sally Faulkner as Terry
- Gail Grainger as Consuela
- Anthony Heaton as Coblintz
- Luis Prendes as Habish
- Simón Andreu as Petrie
- James Smillie as Reardon

== Production ==
Jaguar Lives! was the feature film debut of karate and kickboxing champion Joe Lewis and was planned as being the first in a series of action films featuring Lewis as special agent Jonathan Cross. Filming began on June 26, 1978, in Madrid, Spain. The film was scheduled for six weeks in Spain and four weeks in other countries, including Japan, Germany, Italy, Hong Kong and Macao.

The original film score was composed and conducted by Robert O. Ragland and recorded in London, England with the National Philharmonic Orchestra.

== Release ==
Jaguar Lives! opened in Los Angeles on August 31, 1979.

== Reception ==
From contemporary reviews, Paul Taylor of The Monthly Film Bulletin declared that the film would have been more attractive nine years ago and that "there are a few signs of Pintoff's quirky humour, but overall the film registers as a tacky chore." Taylor noted that “only Donald Pleasence rises to the bait of his over-the-top bit-part villain."
