= Silhouette (lingerie) =

English manufacturer of lingerie

Silhouette is an English manufacturer of women's lingerie. It was founded in 1887.

== History ==
Silhouette grew out of the German corsetry company 'Ski Corset', which was founded by Max Lobbenberg and Emil Blumenau in 1887. The rise of the Nazis forced the Jewish owners to sell Ski Corset to a Bavarian Company but the London subsidiary, under Hans Lobbenberg (son of Max) and Hans Blumenau, Emil's son, continued to operate. Throughout the 1930s, under the name ‘Silhouette Corset’, it flourished to become one of the UK's leading corsetry companies.

It was during this early period that Silhouette brought into existence the world's first (and perhaps only) radioactive corset. In 1937, the ‘Silhouette Radiante’ was successfully marketed to a British public eager to try for themselves the "...stimulating, even rejuvenating influence” of radiation (certified by the Marie Curie Institute). The company also helped the Second World War effort, by making bras and suspender belts for the W.A.A.F., A.T.S. and W.R.N.S.

At the beginning of the Second World War Blitz, Silhouette moved production from London to Shrewsbury, in preference to Coventry where another site had been offered – a choice the two Hanses are said to have been grateful for when Coventry's worst air raids began after the time of their move. They became one of the town's main employers. After the war, Hans Blumenau moved back to London to re-establish the London side of production in King's Cross.

The following decade saw a move away from the traditional corset towards the more comfortable 'elastic girdle'. Silhouette were one of the first companies to promote this new style of corsetry in the UK. The Little X girdle, designed by Annemarie Lobbenberg in 1958, proved to be particularly popular amongst younger women. Still run by members of the original Lobbenberg and Blumenau families, Silhouette continued to grow and by 1969, it owned five factories and employed 1,900 people. The Silhouette brand was sold in 61 countries and the firm was a main supplier for Marks and Spencer, as well as being the largest swimwear manufacturer in Britain. Its popularity was helped by its reputation for excellent fit.

In 1981, Silhouette was sold to M.T.M., which owned Spencer's, an established company known for their made-to-measure corsetry. They recognised that the fashionable Silhouette brand would complement their own, more traditional product. Silhouette production was transferred to the Spencer factory in Banbury.

During the following decade, Silhouette increasingly targeted niche markets, building a strong reputation in areas like maternity wear, mastectomy wear, strapless bras and garments with larger cup fittings.

== Modern Day ==
In 1989, Silhouette was bought by Remploy and became part of the newly formed Textile Group. After Remploy decided to withdraw from lingerie manufacturing, Silhouette was bought by a group of private investors who continued the business as Silhouette Ltd. As a result of the spiraling cost of manufacturing in the UK, Silhouette Ltd went into liquidation in December 2003, but in January 2004, Silhouette Lingerie Ltd bought the designs, machinery and intellectual property rights from the administrators for Silhouette and has continued to produce many of the same styles, including the same Madame X and Little X control garments that were popular in the 60s.

== References in popular culture ==
- In the film Carry on Cruising (1962), the lingerie was provided by Silhouette.
- Silhouette was the subject of a book by Nigel Hinton, entitled Silhouette: The Story of Little X (2009).
- ‘Silhouette’, a play by Chris Eldon-Lee about the period when Silhouette was based in Shropshire, was staged at Market Drayton Festival Centre on November 13 and 14 2009 and at Shrewsbury's Theatre Severn from November 17 to 21 2009.
- Silhouette was included in the 2009 Exhibition 'Undercover: The Evolution of Underwear' at the Fashion and Textile Museum in London.
