= Keep It Clean =

1956 British film by David Paltenghi

- Original British trade ad
- Directed by: David Paltenghi
- Screenplay by: Carl Nystrom; R. F. Delderfield
- Produced by: Maxwell Setton; John R. Sloan
- Starring: Ronald Shiner; Joan Sims
- Cinematography: Wilkie Cooper; Bernard Lewis (camera operator)
- Edited by: John Pomeroy
- Music by: Bruce Montgomery
- Production company: A Setton-Sloan Production
- Distributed by: Eros Films (UK)
- Release date: 1 May 1956 (UK)
- Running time: 75 minutes
- Country: United Kingdom
- Language: English

Keep It Clean is a 1956 British black-and-white comedy film directed by David Paltenghi and starring Ronald Shiner and Joan Sims. The screenplay was by Carl Nystrom and R. F. Delderfield.

== Plot ==
Advertising agent Bert Lane plans to market his brother-in-law Peter's new miracle cleaning machine. However, Bert's boss Mr. Bouncenboy wants him to advertise Mrs Anstey's famous crumpets, but Bert's cheesecake advertising slogans incur the wrath of Mrs Anstey and her Purity League, as well as that of his boss.

== Cast ==
- Ronald Shiner as Bert Lane
- James Hayter as Mr. Bouncenboy
- Diane Hart as Kitty
- Ursula Howells as Pat Anstey
- Jean Cadell as Mrs. Anstey
- Colin Gordon as Peter
- Benny Lee as Tarbottom
- Joan Sims as Violet Tarbottom
- Denis Shaw as Slogger O'Reilly
- Tonia Bern as Colette Dare
- Gerald Campion as Rasher
- Mark Daly as Stage Door keeper
- Albert Whelan as Gregson
- Violet Gould as Lady Pecksniff
- Bert Brownbill as George Buxton
- Tony Sympson as Little Tailor
- Pauline Winter as Bridget
- Lillemor Knudsen as Audrey
- Henry Longhurst as magistrate
- Roger Maxwell as General Ponsenby-Goreham
- Arthur Goullet as loan service official
- Norman Rossington as Arthur, the bearded ad artist
- Humphrey Kent as Pat's escort
- John Wadham as loan service driver
- Harry Purvis as Charlie
- Richard George as Police Constable
- Frank Forsyth as Inspector at Court
- Howard Lang as Police Sergeant
- Robert Moore as theatre attendant
- The Kelroys as acrobats
- Maya Koumani as showgirl
- Yvonne Burke as showgirl
- Lynn Shaw (Jacqueline Jones) as showgirl
- Christina Lubicz as chorus girl
- Anne Lynn as chorus girl
- Yvonne Olena as chorus girl
- Pat Spencer as chorus girl
- Thais Jobbling as chorus girl
- Glynne Raymond as chorus girl
- Eve Kenney as chorus girl
- Diana Satow as chorus girl

== Reception ==
=== Box office ===
The film was a commercial disappointment.

==== Critical ====
Monthly Film Bulletin said "A dispiritingly unfunny farce, which lacks surprise in its story, timing in its slapstick and humorous appeal in its players. Several competent performers are embarrassingly and unhappily involved in the affair."

Kine Weekly said "The picture takes a crack at Mrs. Grundy, a henpecked window cleaner, members of the aristocracy and non-stop striptease variety shows, but does not always hit its mark. What's more, some of its quips are crude, but by and large the fun is reasonably clean, if not clever. Ronald Shiner, who always enjoys his own jokes, never lets up as Bert, Jean Cadell is shrewdly cast as the austere Mrs. Anstey, and the others make eager stooges."

Picturegoer wrote: "It's a pity to see such a first-rate comic as Ronald Shiner running riot over a puny comedy that at best has the makings only of a rowdy music-hall sketch. ... Shiner and James Hayter ham it up outrageously. No bewhiskered gags or comedy characters are spared. If there's a bucket of water around someone is sure to fall into it. ... There are lodgers, window cleaners, striptease girls, old lady firebrands, impoverished aristocrats . . . the lot."

Picture Show called the film "Lively slapstick comedy."

In British Sound Films: The Studio Years 1928–1959 David Quinlan rated the film as "mediocre", writing: "Shiner floundering outside auspices of big studios, time-honoured slapstick situations litter unfunny comedy."
