= Carry On Teacher =

1959 British comedy film by Gerald Thomas

- Original UK quad poster
- Directed by: Gerald Thomas
- Written by: Norman Hudis
- Produced by: Peter Rogers
- Starring: Kenneth Connor; Charles Hawtrey; Leslie Phillips; Joan Sims; Kenneth Williams; Hattie Jacques; Rosalind Knight; Ted Ray
- Cinematography: Reginald Wyer
- Edited by: John Shirley
- Music by: Bruce Montgomery
- Distributed by: Anglo-Amalgamated
- Release date: 3 September 1959
- Running time: 83 mins.
- Country: United Kingdom
- Language: English
- Budget: £71,612 or £78,000

Carry On Teacher is a 1959 British comedy film, the third in the series of 31 Carry On films (1958–1992). It was released at the Plaza Cinema in London on 3 September 1959. It features Ted Ray in his only Carry On role, alongside series regulars; Kenneth Connor, Charles Hawtrey, Kenneth Williams and Hattie Jacques. Leslie Phillips and Joan Sims make their second appearances in the series here, having made their debuts in the previous entry, Carry On Nurse. A young Richard O'Sullivan and Larry Dann – making the first of his four Carry On appearances – turn up as pupils. In 2023, Dann dedicated a chapter of his autobiography Oh, What A Lovely Memoir to share his memories of this production. The film was followed by Carry On Constable (1960).

== Plot ==
During the current term at Maudlin Street Secondary Modern School, William Wakefield – who has been at the school for 20 years – is acting headmaster. He spots an advertisement for a headmaster of a brand new school near where he was born and decides to apply for the post. Because of a coinciding visit by a Ministry of Education Inspector, Miss Wheeler, and the noted child psychiatrist Alistair Grigg, he decides to enlist the help of his staff to ensure that the school routine runs smoothly during their visit.

While in conference with his teaching staff (including Gregory Adams, science master; Edwin Milton, English master; Michael Bean, music teacher; Sarah Allcock, gym mistress and Grace Short, maths teacher), senior pupil Robin Stevens overhears that Wakefield is planning to leave at the end of term. The pupils are fond of the venerable teacher and Stevens immediately rushes this information to his schoolmates. They plan to sabotage every endeavour that might earn Wakefield praise, hoping to knock him off the road to his new post.

On arrival, Grigg and Miss Wheeler are escorted by Wakefield on a tour of inspection and the pupils go out of their way to misbehave in each class they visit. Griggs' tour has not been in vain: he has taken a shine to Sarah Allcock, the gym mistress, and it is obvious the feeling is mutual. Miss Wheeler is disgusted at the behaviour of the children towards the teachers, but is softened when she visits Adams class. He is the science master, nervous but charming, and she feels an instinctive maternal affection for him.

Wakefield realises his position as headmaster of the new school is in jeopardy and, on seeing Miss Wheeler's interest in Adams, enlists his help. He asks Adams to make advances to Miss Wheeler to win her over. Adams is aghast at the thought, but eventually agrees to do his best. After many unsuccessful attempts to tell Miss Wheeler of his love, Adams finds an untruth has become truth and finds enough courage to declare his feelings.

Meanwhile the pupils have been doing everything in their power to make things go wrong, and on the last day of term are caught trying to sabotage the prize giving. They are told to report to Wakefield's study and after much cross-examination he learns the reason for the week's events – the pupils simply did not want to see him leave. Wakefield – deeply moved – tells the children he will not leave and will see them all next term. Miss Wheeler, buoyed by her newfound love, announces that she intends to tell the Ministry that staff-pupil relationships at the school are excellent.

== Production Notes ==
During the filming, Charles Hawtrey's mother would often visit the set. While enjoying a cigarette, she accidentally dropped lit ash from the cigarette into her handbag. Joan Sims, who was the first to spot the incident, yelled, "Charlie, Charlie, your mother's bag is on fire!". Charles Hawtrey poured his cup of tea into the bag, snapped it shut, and carried on chatting as if nothing had happened.

Ted Ray was not able to play other leads in Carry On films due to his contract with ABC Pictures but he did appear in Please Turn Over for Peter Rogers.

== Cast ==
- Ted Ray as Mr William Wakefield
- Kenneth Connor as Mr Gregory Adams
- Charles Hawtrey as Mr Michael Bean
- Leslie Phillips as Mr Alistair Grigg
- Kenneth Williams as Mr Edwin Milton
- Hattie Jacques as Miss Grace Short
- Joan Sims as Miss Sarah Allcock
- Rosalind Knight as Miss Felicity Wheeler
- Cyril Chamberlain as Mr Alf Hodgson
- Richard O'Sullivan as Robin Stevens
- George Howell as Billy Haig
- Roy Hines as Harry Bird
- Diana Beevers as Penny Lee
- Jacqueline Lewis as Pat Gordon
- Carol White as Sheila Dale
- Jane White as Irene Ambrose
- Paul Cole as John Atkins
- Larry Dann as Pupil
- Irene French as Monica (uncredited)

== Filming and locations ==
- Filming dates – 9 March-14 April 1959

Interiors:

- Pinewood Studios, Buckinghamshire

Exteriors:

- Drayton Green Primary School, Ealing

== Reception ==
Variety called the film "an unabashed collection of uninhibited gag situations and dialog, but this time screenplay writer Norman Hudis has developed a slightly stronger story line and made the characters more credible ... Some of the gags are telegraphed but the cheerful impudence with which they are dropped into the script is completely disarming." Margaret Harford of the Los Angeles Times wrote: "Carry On, Teacher gets a high mark for low comedy in the slapstick fashion of previous japes about doctors, nurses and sergeants. It's silly nonsense but it's fun and that's not telling tales out of school." The Monthly Film Bulletin stated: "Another slapstick farce in the Carry On series which, although predictable and occasionally pressed too hard, still manages to register some adroitly timed humour."

According to Kinematograph Weekly, the film performed "better than average" at the British box office in 1959.

== Legacy ==
The school in the film, Maudlin Street Secondary Modern School appears in the book The Boy in the Dress by David Walliams, where the headmaster of the school attended by Dennis, the lead character is also called Mr Hawtry, in reference to Charles Hawtrey, who appears as the music teacher in Carry On Teacher.

== Bibliography ==
- Davidson, Andy (2012). Carry On Confidential. London: Miwk. ISBN 978-1-908630-01-8.
- Sheridan, Simon (2011). Keeping the British End Up – Four Decades of Saucy Cinema. London: Titan Books. ISBN 978-0-85768-279-6.
- Webber, Richard (2009). 50 Years of Carry On. London: Arrow. ISBN 978-0-09-949007-4.
- Hudis, Norman (2008). No Laughing Matter. London: Apex. ISBN 978-1-906358-15-0.
- Keeping the British End Up: Four Decades of Saucy Cinema by Simon Sheridan (third edition) (2007) (Reynolds & Hearn Books)
- Ross, Robert (2002). The Carry On Companion. London: Batsford. ISBN 978-0-7134-8771-8.
- Bright, Morris; Ross, Robert (2000). Mr Carry On – The Life & Work of Peter Rogers. London: BBC Books. ISBN 978-0-563-55183-6.
- Rigelsford, Adrian (1996). Carry On Laughing – a celebration. London: Virgin. ISBN 1-85227-554-5.
- Hibbin, Sally & Nina (1988). What a Carry On. London: Hamlyn. ISBN 978-0-600-55819-4.
- Eastaugh, Kenneth (1978). The Carry On Book. London: David & Charles. ISBN 978-0-7153-7403-0.
