= Carry On Constable =

1960 British comedy film by Gerald Thomas

- Original UK quad poster
- Directed by: Gerald Thomas
- Screenplay by: Peter Rogers; Norman Hudis
- Story by: Norman Hudis
- Produced by: Peter Rogers
- Starring: Leslie Phillips; Shirley Eaton; Eric Barker; Sidney James
- Cinematography: Ted Scaife
- Edited by: John Shirley
- Music by: Bruce Montgomery
- Distributed by: Anglo-Amalgamated
- Release date: 25 February 1960
- Running time: 83 min.
- Country: United Kingdom
- Language: English
- Budget: £82,500

Carry On Constable is a 1960 British comedy film, the fourth in the series of 31 Carry On films (1958–1992). It was released in February 1960. Of the regular team, it featured Kenneth Connor, Kenneth Williams, Charles Hawtrey, Joan Sims, and Hattie Jacques. Sid James makes his debut in the series here, while early regulars Leslie Phillips, Eric Barker, and Shirley Eaton also turn up, although Phillips did not appear again in the series for 32 years. It was the first "Carry On..." film to include some nudity with Connor, Hawtrey, Williams, and Phillips baring their behinds during a shower scene. The film was followed by Carry On Regardless (1961).

== Plot ==
A suburban police station is understaffed due to a flu epidemic, and Sergeant Wilkins, under pressure to maintain staffing levels, is pleased to hear that three new recruits, fresh out of training school, are due shortly.

On their way into the station, the three policemen inadvertently assist some bank robbers into their getaway car, and are embarrassed when they learn the truth. The new constables are self-proclaimed intellectual and amateur psychologist PC Stanley Benson, former socially well-connected playboy and cad PC Tom Potter, and extremely superstitious PC Charles Constable. The arrival of WPC Gloria Passworthy, with whom Constable falls in love, and Special Constable Timothy Gorse completes the roster.

Out on the beat, the new constables try hard, but are less than successful. Benson nearly arrests a plainclothes detective, and Constable believes he has heard a murder being committed, but it turns out to be a radio play. Potter investigates a report of an intruder, but finds a young woman in the bath and engages in a civil conversation with her about her recently broken relationship. Gorse, tasked to patrol with a police dog, is unable to control it. With their careers on the line, they double down and have better luck when a wages robbery takes place. Benson and Potter locate the getaway car (a Plymouth Cambridge), and all four engage in a confrontation with the thieves, arresting them and recovering the money.

Commended for his efficiency and excellent results, Inspector Mills is promoted to a training position and Wilkins is promoted to replace him. Charlie Constable gets his girl (with a little help from Sgt. Moon) and stops being superstitious.

== Cast ==
- Sid James as Station sergeant Frank Wilkins
- Eric Barker as Inspector Mills
- Kenneth Connor as Constable Charlie Constable
- Charles Hawtrey as Special Constable Timothy Gorse
- Kenneth Williams as PC Stanley Benson
- Leslie Phillips as PC Tom Potter
- Joan Sims as WPC Gloria Passworthy
- Hattie Jacques as Sergeant Laura Moon
- Shirley Eaton as Sally Barry
- Cyril Chamberlain as PC Thurston
- Joan Hickson as Mrs May
- Irene Handl as Distraught Mother
- Terence Longdon as Herbert Hall
- Jill Adams as WPC Harrison
- Freddie Mills as Jewel thief
- Brian Oulton as Store manager
- Victor Maddern as Detective Sergeant Liddell
- Esma Cannon as Deaf old lady
- Hilda Fenemore as Agitated woman
- Lucy Griffiths as Miss Horton
- Noel Dyson as Vague woman
- Dorinda Stevens as Young Woman

== Crew ==
- Screenplay – Peter Rogers & Norman Hudis
- Story – Norman Hudis
- Idea – Brock Williams
- Music – Bruce Montgomery
- Art Director – Carmen Dillon
- Director of Photography – Ted Scaife
- Editor – John Shirley
- Production Manager – Frank Bevis
- Camera Operator – Alan Hume
- Assistant Director – Peter Manley
- Sound Editor – Leslie Wiggins
- Sound Recordists – Robert T MacPhee & Bill Daniels
- Continuity – Joan Davis
- Make-up – George Blackler
- Hairdressing – Stella Rivers
- Dress Designer – Yvonne Caffin
- Set Dressing – Vernon Dixon
- Casting Director – Betty White
- Producer – Peter Rogers
- Director – Gerald Thomas

== Role of Sergeant Wilkins ==
Initially, the role of Sergeant Wilkins was intended for Ted Ray following his work on the previous film Carry On Teacher. However, Ray was contracted to ABC (despite being unused by them), who distributed the Carry On films to cinemas. Unhappy seeing one of their contracted actors in a rival production, they threatened to stop distribution, so Peter Rogers reluctantly dropped him from the films and replaced him with Sid James, thus beginning James's 19-film long membership on the Carry On team.

== Filming and locations ==
- Filming dates – 9 November-18 December 1959

Interiors:

- Pinewood Studios, Buckinghamshire

Exteriors:

- The streets of Ealing, London

The exterior of the police station is Hanwell Library, Cherrington Road, W7. Other scenes were filmed along the parade of shops on The Avenue in West Ealing, W13, with the Drayton Court Hotel visible in many scenes. The Royal Mail Sorting Office in Manor Road and the railway footbridge over the GWR out of West Ealing is also seen as still standing today. Other scenes were filmed on and around St Mary's Road (including St Mary's Church) and the surrounding streets, Ealing W5. The store used was F.H. Rowse department store. The building was demolished in the early 1980s and was situated on the junction of Green Man Lane and Uxbridge Road in Ealing.

== Release ==
The fourth film in the classic British comedy film series, Carry On Constable premiered at London's Plaza cinema on 25 February 1960.

== Reception ==
=== Box office ===
It was the third most popular film at the British box office in 1960, after Doctor in Love and Sink the Bismarck!.

=== Critical ===
Variety wrote, "At times it seems that the team is hard put to it to keep up the laughter pressure but, all in all, this achieves its objective of providing harmless merriment." Geoffrey M. Warren of the Los Angeles Times noted, "Most of the gags are visual in the tradition of Laurel and Hardy, the Marx Bros. and others, though no individual performer is of this caliber of comic performer." He went on, though, to praise director Gerald Thomas for having "accomplished a remarkable amount of good cinema here. The situations are worked to perfection and always held within the limits of the possible, if just barely." The Monthly Film Bulletin wrote, "The 'Carry On' series looks like becoming an anthology of all the slap-and-tickle music-hall jokes that have ever been cracked. The laughter here centres on dropped trousers, ample bosoms, innuendo, female impersonation, lingerie and male nudity. Out of this frayed material a little comedy is coaxed by the familiar cast as they grapple with the random situations that pass for a plot."

== Bibliography ==
- Davidson, Andy (2012). Carry On Confidential. London: Miwk. ISBN 978-1-908630-01-8.
- Sheridan, Simon (2011). Keeping the British End Up – Four Decades of Saucy Cinema. London: Titan Books. ISBN 978-0-85768-279-6.
- Webber, Richard (2009). 50 Years of Carry On. London: Arrow. ISBN 978-0-09-949007-4.
- Hudis, Norman (2008). No Laughing Matter. London: Apex. ISBN 978-1-906358-15-0.
- Keeping the British End Up: Four Decades of Saucy Cinema by Simon Sheridan (third edition) (2007) (Reynolds & Hearn Books)
- Ross, Robert (2002). The Carry On Companion. London: Batsford. ISBN 978-0-7134-8771-8.
- Bright, Morris; Ross, Robert (2000). Mr Carry On – The Life & Work of Peter Rogers. London: BBC Books. ISBN 978-0-563-55183-6.
- Rigelsford, Adrian (1996). Carry On Laughing – a celebration. London: Virgin. ISBN 1-85227-554-5.
- Hibbin, Sally & Nina (1988). What a Carry On. London: Hamlyn. ISBN 978-0-600-55819-4.
- Eastaugh, Kenneth (1978). The Carry On Book. London: David & Charles. ISBN 978-0-7153-7403-0.
