= Kenneth Connor =

English actor (1918–1993)

Kenneth Connor MBE
- Publicity photo of Connor from 1959
- Born: 6 June 1918; London, England
- Died: 28 November 1993 (aged 75); Harrow, London, England
- Resting place: Breakspear Crematorium, Ruislip, Greater London, England
- Education: Royal Central School of Speech and Drama
- Occupation: Actor
- Years active: 1936–1993
- Known for: Carry On films 'Allo 'Allo! Blackadder The Third
- Spouse: Margaret Knox (m. 1942)
- Children: 1

Kenneth Connor (6 June 1918 – 28 November 1993) was a British stage, film and broadcasting actor, who rose to national prominence with his appearances in the Carry On films.

== Early life ==
Connor was born in Highbury, Islington, London, the son of a naval petty officer who organised concert parties. He first appeared on the stage at the age of two as an organ-grinder's monkey in one of his father's shows, in Portsmouth. By the age of 11 he had his own act. He attended the Central School of Speech and Drama, where he was a Gold Medal winner. Connor made his professional debut in J. M. Barrie's The Boy David, at His Majesty's Theatre, London, in December 1936.

His brother was a Doctor in General Practice in Hampshire.

During the Second World War he served as an infantry gunner with the Middlesex Regiment, but continued acting by touring Italy and the Middle East with the Stars in Battledress concert party and ENSA. Earlier in the war, in 1941, he was apparently performing as a comedic entertainer in a concert party named the "Tam o Shanter's", as evidenced by a programme from the concert at the Summer Theatre at Felixstowe, dated Saturday 5 July 1941. The full cast autographed the programme, suggesting a final performance for the concert party, with Kenneth signing it "All the best Ken Connor". While waiting to be demobbed in Cairo, Connor received a telegram from William Devlin asking him to join the newly formed Bristol Old Vic, where he gained a solid grounding in the classics.

== Career ==
Connor moved on to the London Old Vic Company for a 1947–48 season at the New Theatre. His most notable performances there were as Chaplain de Stogumber in Saint Joan and Dobchinsky in The Government Inspector, which starred Alec Guinness. Realising he was not a "tall, impressive juvenile lead or a young lover type", he decided to specialise in comedy. Connor appeared in Talbot Rothwell's farce Queen Elizabeth Slept Here in the West End in 1949.

He took over from Peter Sellers in Ted Ray's radio show Ray's a Laugh, which was launched by the BBC in 1949 as a successor to Tommy Handley's ITMA. Connor played the brother-in-law, and other oddball characters such as Sidney Mincing. Ray took Connor with him to his TV shows, and the pair would star together in the third Carry On film, Carry On Teacher.

On occasion, he appeared in The Goon Show, standing in for regular cast members struck down by illness. He also appeared in the anarchic, Goon-style TV series The Idiot Weekly, Price 2d (1956) and A Show Called Fred (1956).

Connor gained a small role in the film The Ladykillers (1955) as a taxi driver. In 1958, he was cast in the first Carry On film, Carry On Sergeant, and became one of the regular cast in the series, appearing in seventeen of the original thirty films and many of the associated television productions. Alongside Kenneth Williams and Eric Barker, Connor was one of only three actors to appear in both the first and last of the original sequence of Carry On films (Carry On Sergeant and Carry On Emmannuelle).

In his earlier Carry On appearances, Connor frequently played the romantic lead or other sympathetic roles (typically with an element of comically neurotic anxiety), while later appearances saw him play less sympathetic characters such as married men with wandering eyes who made lascivious remarks. In Carry On Nurse (1959), his real-life son Jeremy appeared as his character Bernie Bishop's son. In 1961, he starred with fellow Carry On stars Sid James and Esma Cannon in the comedy film What a Carve Up! In fact, in the 1959–61 period, he was one of the most prominent leading men in British comedy films. As well as What a Carve Up! and the Carry On films, other films he starred in during this period included Watch Your Stern (1960), Nearly a Nasty Accident (1961) and the Dentist films. In 1960, he did the voices of the horse and dog in the Four Feather Falls puppet series.

Connor had a good tenor voice, which he occasionally used to good effect, such as in the 1962 movie Carry On Cruising.

In contrast with some of his Carry On co-stars, Connor found further success on the London stage. He starred in the revue One Over The Eight (1962), at the Duke of York's Theatre, the original London West End production with Frankie Howerd of the Stephen Sondheim musical A Funny Thing Happened on the Way to the Forum (1963), as Hysterium – and directed the show when it went on tour – The Four Musketeers (1967), with Harry Secombe at the Theatre Royal, Drury Lane, playing King Louis XIII, and the revue Carry On London (1973) at the Victoria Palace.

Between 1971 and 1973, Connor joined Dad's Army stars Arthur Lowe and Ian Lavender in the BBC radio comedy Parsley Sidings. On television, he appeared in The Black and White Minstrel Show, as Whatsisname Smith in the children's show Rentaghost (1983–84), and as Monsieur Alfonse in 'Allo 'Allo! (1984–1992) and Uncle Sammy Morris in Hi-de-Hi! (1986–88). He also made guest appearances in sitcoms including That's My Boy and You Rang, M'Lord? and he also appeared in the episode "Sense and Senility" of Blackadder the Third in 1987, alongside fellow veteran comic star Hugh Paddick.

In 1991, he was appointed Member of the Order of the British Empire (MBE).

Connor was still working just days before his death, appearing on Noel Edmonds' Telly Addicts. His final TV appearance, as Mr Warren in The Memoirs of Sherlock Holmes episode The Red Circle, was broadcast posthumously in 1994.

== Death ==
Connor died of cancer at the age of 75 at his home in Harrow in Middlesex on 28 November 1993. His body was cremated at Breakspear Crematorium in Ruislip, Greater London.

== Personal life ==
Connor married Margaret Knox ("Miki") in 1942; his son, Jeremy, was a child actor.

== Acting credits ==
=== Film ===
Year	Title	Role	Notes
1939	Poison Pen	Telephonist	
1949	The Passionate Pilgrim	Murphy	
1950	Over The Odds	Sydney	
1950	Don't Say Die	Pat O'Neill	
1951	Rush Job	Percy Prangle	
1952	The Elstree Story		
1952	Miss Robin Hood	Board Member	Uncredited
1953	There Was a Young Lady	Tom Bass	
1953	Marilyn	Customer	
1954	The Black Rider	George Amble	
1955	The Ladykillers	Taxi Driver	Uncredited
1957	Davy	Herbie	
1958	Carry On Sergeant	Horace Strong	
1959	Make Mine a Million	Anxious husband	
1959	Carry On Nurse	Bernie Bishop	
1959	Carry On Teacher	Gregory Adams	
1960	Carry On Constable	Constable Charlie Constable	
1960	Dentist in the Chair	Sam Field	
1960	Watch Your Stern	Ordinary Seaman Blissworth	
1961	His and Hers	Harold	
1961	Carry On Regardless	Sam Twist	
1961	A Weekend with Lulu	British Tourist	
1961	Nearly a Nasty Accident	AC 2 Alexander Wood	
1961	Dentist on the Job	Sam Field	
1961	What a Carve Up!	Ernest Broughton	
1962	Carry On Cruising	Dr. Arthur Binn	
1963	Carry On Cabby	Ted Watson	
1964	Carry On Cleo	Hengist Pod	
1965	How to Undress in Public Without Undue Embarrassment		
1965	Gonks Go Beat	Wilco Roger	
1967	Cuckoo Patrol	Wick	
1967	Danny the Dragon	Danny the Dragon	Voice
1969	Captain Nemo and the Underwater City	Swallow Bath	
1969	Rhubarb	Mr Rhubarb	
1970	Carry On Up the Jungle	Claude Chumley	
1971	Carry On Henry	Lord Hampton of Wick	
1972	Carry On Matron	Mr. Tidy	
1972	Carry On Abroad	Stanley Blunt	
1973	Carry On Girls	Mayor Frederick Bumble	
1974	Carry On Dick	The Constable	
1975	Carry On Behind	Major Leep	
1976	Carry On England	Captain S. Melly	
1978	Carry On Emmannuelle	Leyland	

=== Television ===
Year	Title	Role	Notes
1949	The Passionate Pilgrim	Murphy	
1949	Oranges and Lemons		Musical review
1950	Over the Odds	Sydney	
1950	Rush Job	Perce Prangle	
1951	The Boy with a Cart	Demiwulf	
1952	Winnie-the-Pooh	Rabbit	Episode: "In Which Rabbit Has a Busy Day"
1952	It's a Small World	Narrator / Arfer	
1952	The Sand Castle	Bert / Puffin / Shrimp	6 episodes
1952	Shadow Pictures		3 episodes: "The Grasshopper and the Ant", "Three Wishes", "The Sleeping Beauty"
1952	Huckleberry Finn		3 episodes: The Auction" (Levi Bell); "Jackson's Island" and "The Widow Douglas's" (Pap Finn)
1953	BBC Sunday-Night Theatre	Touchstone	"As You Like It"
1953	Tom's Goblin	Lot	
1953	The Rose and the Ring	Mr. Gruffanuff	
1954–55	The Grove Family	Park-Keeper	2 episodes: "Crisis" (1954), "Rabbits" (1955)
1954	Stage by Stage	Coupler	2 episodes: "The Relapse or, Virtue in Danger", "Pageant Wagon to Citizens' Theatre"
1954	The Three Princes	The Carpet Dealer	
1954	This is Show Business, with Vic Oliver	Self	Series 3, Episode 3
1955–56	Emney Enterprises		12 episodes + special
1955	The Farmer's Wife	Henry Coaker	
1955	Will O' the Gris (short)	voice	
1956–58	The Ted Ray Show		18 episodes
1956	Alice's Adventures in Wonderland	March Hare	
1956	This Is Your Life	Self	Episode: "These Were Your Lives"
1956	The Idiot Weekly, Price 2d	various	6 episodes
1956	Alfred Marks Time	Self	Series 1, Episode 3
1956	A Show Called Fred	various	5 episodes
1956	The Charlie Farnsbarns Show		
1956	Son of Fred		Episodes 1 and 5
1957	Gentlemen, Be Seated!	Self	
1957	A Short History of Man and Music: Part 2		
1957	Pantomania: Babes in the Wood	School Inspector / Lawyer	
1957	Salute to Show Business	Self	
1957	Six-Five Special	Self	Series 1, Episode 33
1957	The World Our Stage	Self	
1957	The Saturday Show	Self	Episodes of 9 November and 14 December
1957–60	Hi, Summer!	Self	22 episodes
1958–66	The Black and White Minstrel Show	Self / Master of Ceremonies	14 episodes
1958	My Pal Bob		Series 2, Episodes 3 and 4
1958	ITV Television Playhouse	Nat	"Poet's Corner"
1958	Christmas Night with the Stars		
1958	Dick Whittington and His Cat	Mate	
1959	The Anne Shelton Show		3 episodes
1960	Showtime	Self	Series 2, Episode 5
1960	The Four Just Men	Milloti	"The Man in the Royal Suite"
1960	Torchy the Battery Boy	Voices	52 episodes
1960	Four Feather Falls	Voices	39 episodes
1961	The Sid James Show		
1962	Adam Faith Sings Songs Old and New	Self	
1962	The Jo Stafford Show	Self	Episode: "The Age of Chivalry"
1962	Somerset Maugham Hour	Mortimer Ellis	Episode: "The Round Dozen"
1963–64	Don't Say a Word	Self	21 episodes
1963	Fit for Heroes	Corporal Rust	
1963	Boyd Q.C.	Bajendra Singh	Episode: "What the Eye Doesn't See"
1964	How to Be an Alien		Episode: "Courtship"
1964	Ninety Years On		Episode: "Courtship"
1965	A World of Comedy		Episode: "The Enormous Ear"
1965	Spare a Copper	PC Albert Hereward Lamp	
1965	A Slight Case of...	Mr Coker	Episode: "Opium"
1965	A Night At The Music Hall	Self	14 February - reciting poetry
1966	Room at the Bottom	Gus Fogg	7 episodes
1966	Millicent	Self	Episode 2
1967	Danny the Dragon	voice of Danny	18 episodes
1967	David Frost's Night Out in London	Self	
1968	David Nixon	Self	
1968	Hullabaloo	Self	
1969	The Jimmy Logan Show		Episode 4
1969	According to Dora		Series 2, Episode 7
1970–1971	On the House	Gussie Sissons	12 episodes
1970	Jokers Wild	Self	Series 2, Episodes 9 and 10
1971	The Golden Shot	Self	Series 3, Episode 45
1972	The 14th Annual TV Week Logie Awards	Self	
1972	The Pressure-Pak Show	Self	
1972	Sez Les	Various	Series 4, Episode 2
1972	The Kenneth Connor Show (Nine Network Australia)		4 episodes
1973	Looks Familiar	Self	
1975	Carry On Laughing	Various	12 episodes
1976	Celebrity Squares	Self	
1979–86	3-2-1	Self / Merlin	9 episodes
1979	Ted on the Spot	Self	
1980	Frankie Howerd Reveals All		
1980	East Lynne	Mr Dill	
1982–84	Rentaghost	Whatsisname Smith	3 episodes
1982	The Royal Variety Performance 1982	Self	
1982	Movie Memories	Self	
1983	This Is Your Life	Self	Life of Anna Neagle
1984–1992	'Allo 'Allo!	Monsieur Alfonse	62 episodes
1984	Aladdin and the Forty Thieves	Abdul	
1985	Remember the Lambeth Walk	Self / presenter	
1986–88	Hi-de-Hi!	Uncle Sammy Morris	12 episodes
1986	That's My Boy	Robert Taylor	Episode: "Something to Love"
1987	Blackadder the Third	Enoch Mossop	Episode: "Sense and Senility"
1987	Wogan	Self	
1989	Sir Norbert Smith, a Life	Greenham officer	
1990	You Rang, M'Lord?	Professor Heinrich Van Manheim	Episode: "Labour or Love"
1990	Made in Heaven?	Harry Ingrams	Episode: "Best of Enemies"
1990	Artifax	Self	
1993	That's Showbusiness	Self	
1993	Noel Edmonds' Telly Addicts	Self	
1994	The Memoirs of Sherlock Holmes	Mr. Warren	Episode: "The Red Circle" (Posthumous release)

== Recordings ==
Year	Title	Format	Label	Notes	Ref
1959	Rail Road Rock / Ramona	Vinyl, 7" single	Top Rank (45-JAR 138)		
1961	Nearly A Nasty Accident / Smile	Vinyl, 7" single	Fontana (267161 TF)		
1966	Winnie The Pooh / Teddy Bears' Picnic	Vinyl, 7" single	Surprise Surprise (No 4)	with Jim Dale, Cheryl Kennedy with The Wonderland Singers And Alyn Ainsworth and His Orchestra	
1966	Songs From Walt Disney's Winnie The Pooh and Other Children's Favourites	Vinyl, LP, Mono	Music For Pleasure (MFP 1078)	with Jim Dale, Cheryl Kennedy with The Wonderland Singers And Alyn Ainsworth and His Orchestra	
1971	Much Ado About Love	Vinyl, LP	Avenue (AVE085)	with Glennis Beresford	
1993	A Funny Thing Happened On The Way To The Forum	CD	EMI (CDANGEL 3)	Frankie Howerd, Kenneth Connor, Jon Pertwee, Robertson Hare, 'Monsewer' Eddie Gray	
