= Watch Your Stern =

1960 British film by Gerald Thomas

- DVD Cover
- Directed by: Gerald Thomas
- Written by: Earle Couttie (play); Alan Hackney
- Produced by: Peter Rogers
- Starring: Eric Barker; Leslie Phillips; Kenneth Connor
- Cinematography: Ted Scaife
- Edited by: John Shirley
- Music by: Bruce Montgomery
- Distributed by: Anglo-Amalgamated Film Distributors
- Release date: September 1960
- Running time: 90 minutes
- Country: United Kingdom
- Language: English

Watch Your Stern is a 1960 British comedy film directed by Gerald Thomas and starring Kenneth Connor, Eric Barker and Leslie Phillips. It was written by Alan Hackney based on the play Something About a Sailor by Earle Couttie.

The film shares its cast and production team with the Carry On films, but is not an official member of the series. It also has similarities to the long-running BBC radio series The Navy Lark.

It is the only film to feature Sid James with a full beard (Royal Navy style) and the first to feature Spike Milligan in his Indian character.

== Plot ==
HMS Terrier, a Royal Navy warship, is docked at Chatham Royal Dockyard. The officers are drinking gin and tonics in the captain's quarters while the crew are down below being given casual but technical lectures by Seaman Blissworth, who is very knowledgeable about torpedoes. An American Naval Commander arrives on board to discuss plans for a new "acoustic torpedo".

Blissworth accidentally spills a drink on the secret plans and hangs it out to dry in front of a heater. He swaps the folded secret plan for other plans (for the ice unit). The heater burns a hole in the secret plan. They try and hide the fact from a fiery visiting Admiral.

The visiting Commander, now en route to London has the only surviving plan. Blissworth is sent on a bicycle to catch him. This fails as he is not allowed out without a pass.

Meanwhile Admiral Pettigrew wants to see the plans. He has already encountered Blissworth on his bike so stage one is to throw the bike overboard. It is decided to disguise Blissworth as a scientific expert, Professor Potter. In order to achieve this he has the petty officer's generous beard glued onto his chin, glasses are added and he adopts a Scottish accent. He convinces the visitor that the circuit diagram of a refrigeration unit is actually that of the torpedo. At the same time, the real scientist turns out to be female, Agatha Potter, and phones to say she will be late. The confusion causes her to be arrested as a suspected spy.

Meanwhile Petty Officer Mundy is ordered to shave off the remains of his whiskers (as the only two Royal Navy options are clean shaven or "full set").

Blissworth then is re-disguised as a woman: Agatha Potter. He is collected by the Admiral's secretary and taken to Admiralty House to meet the Admiral. He is there when the real Agatha calls and exposes him. He gets out and gets a lift with the returning American commander in his car, where he manages to get the correct torpedo plan back. Back on the ship he returns the plan and quickly gets changed back to uniform before the admiral returns with the real professor. As he tries to sneak out he cannot help but interrupt the discussion and discovers the flaw in the current design.

He is invited to work with the professor on the design. When the first torpedo is eventually fired it turns around and blows up their own ship.

== Cast ==
- Kenneth Connor as Ordinary Seaman Blissworth
- Sid James as Chief Petty Officer Mundy
- Joan Sims as Ann Foster
- Hattie Jacques as Agatha Potter
- Eric Barker as Captain David Foster
- Leslie Phillips as Lieutenant Commander Bill Fanshawe
- Noel Purcell as Admiral Sir Humphrey Pettigrew
- Spike Milligan as Ranjid as civilian electrician #1
- Eric Sykes as civilian electrician #2
- David Lodge as Admiralty Constabulary Sergeant
- Victor Maddern as sailor fishing for bike
- Ed Devereaux as Commander Phillips USN
- Robin Ray as Flag Lieutenant (aide to the admiral)
- George Street as Second Admiralty Constabulary guard
- Peter Howell as Admiral's secretary

== Production ==
The Royal Navy provided cooperation, allowing the producers to film in Chatham Dockyard, and aboard HMS Jaguar and HMS Chaplet.

== Reception ==
=== Box office ===
Kine Weekly called it a "money maker" at the British box office in 1960.

=== Critical reception ===
The Monthly Film Bulletin wrote: "In its popular field this is reasonably funny. The highlights are Kenneth Connor's male and female impersonations and Spike Milligan's two brief appearances as a "Dockyard Matey"' – a welcome piece of sheer "goonery" in an otherwise conventional "Carry On" farce."

The Radio Times Guide to Films gave the film 2/5 stars, writing: "Gerald Thomas's nautical comedy may be full of Carry On names on both sides of the camera, but it's a disappointing affair. There aren't all that many laughs as twitchy tar Connor assumes a range of disguises to cover up a blunder over torpedo plans. But the by-play between the characters is slick and there's some amusing slapstick."
