= Carry On Regardless =

1961 British comedy film by Gerald Thomas

- Original UK quad poster
- Directed by: Gerald Thomas
- Written by: Norman Hudis
- Produced by: Peter Rogers
- Starring: Sidney James; Kenneth Connor; Charles Hawtrey; Joan Sims; Kenneth Williams; Bill Owen; Liz Fraser; Terence Longdon
- Cinematography: Alan Hume
- Edited by: John Shirley
- Music by: Bruce Montgomery
- Distributed by: Anglo-Amalgamated
- Release dates: 23 March 1961 (premiere); 7 April 1961
- Running time: 90 min.
- Country: United Kingdom
- Language: English
- Budget: £100,000

Carry On Regardless is a 1961 British comedy film, the fifth in the series of 31 Carry On films (1958–1992). The film revolves loosely around the activities of a job agency, 'Helping Hand', run by Sid James's character, Bert Handy. By now a fairly regular team was established with Sid James, Kenneth Connor, Charles Hawtrey, Joan Sims and Kenneth Williams all having appeared in previous entries. Hattie Jacques – who was also a regular – makes a cameo appearance during a hospital scene. "Professor" Stanley Unwin appears in a guest role, playing his trademark "gobbledegook" speaking act. It was the final appearance in the series for early regular Terence Longdon. Liz Fraser made her debut and appeared in a further three Carry On films. The film was followed by Carry On Cruising (1962).

== Plot ==
At the local labour exchange, everyone moans about the lack of decent jobs. Nearby, Bert Handy and his secretary Miss Cooling attempt to fill vacancies at Helping Hand, a new enterprise. When word gets round, people rush to the agency, notably Sam Twist, Francis Courtenay, Delia King, Gabriel Dimple, Lily Duveen, Mike Weston and Montgomery Infield-Hopping. Bert decides to hire them all. After dealing with a challenging customer who only speaks gobbledygook, business picks up and each new hire gets an assignment.

Delia is hired out to try on women's wardrobe for Mr Delling, who is planning a surprise for his wife. Things get complicated when the man's wife arrives home unexpectedly. Sam Twist is sent to a baby-sitting job, only to find that there is not a baby to be sat. Instead, there is Mrs Panting, a woman who needs to make her husband jealous, succeeding in the process while Sam gets a black eye. Francis is assigned to take a pet for a walk. The pet turns out be a chimpanzee, and Francis discovers that people who work in the transport industry have an aversion to apes. They eventually end up at a chimps tea party, enjoying an afternoon tea. Lily Duveen, who has been employed at a wine tasting evening, collects invitation cards from the attendees. Afterwards, she samples some wines and makes a spectacle of herself.

Helping Hand's next client is a man from Amalgamated Scrap-Iron. Being busy, he requests that someone take his place in the queue at the hospital outpatients department. Bert promises to send someone, but the chap insists that the top man does the job himself. Bert ends up queuing at the hospital, where he is mistaken for an eminent diagnostician and taken on a tour of the hospital.

The next job that Francis undertakes is as a model. Chuffed that he has been chosen, he is crestfallen after discovering that the job is an advertisement for a bee-keeper's helmet. His next job is between a bickering couple. The husband cannot understand his wife, who continually berates him in her native German. Thanks to Francis getting emotionally involved, the wife starts speaking English and the couple make up.

Boxer Vincent pops into the office. He requires four helpers to act as seconds for his fighter Dynamite Dan. When they get to the venue, Dan is terrified by his opponent, Mickey McGee, and pretends he has sprained his finger. The fight is off until Gabriel takes on McGee instead. Sam is excited over his next job, which he thinks is a secret spying mission to the Forth Bridge, (Note: Recalling Alfred Hitchcock's film of The 39 Steps.) when all that is required of him is to make up a fourth in a game of bridge. Returning, Sam learns that the whole of Helping Hand has been engaged to demonstrate exhibits at the Ideal House Exhibition. (Note: Based on the real Ideal Home Exhibition.) All of the demonstrations end in calamity. Sam's next job is at an exclusive men's club, where no matter how hard he tries he cannot keep silent, which is a strict rule of the establishment.

Miss Cooling decides on a new filing system for a more streamlined operation, and job cards are put in cubby holes for each of the workers. The cleaner knocks the box down and puts the cards back out of order. Everyone gets someone else's assignment, with disastrous results. The gobbledygook man returns, and this time Francis is there to translate. He is their landlord and has been trying to announce that they will have to vacate the premises, because he has had a better offer. Due to a show of unity by all the staff, the landlord agrees that they can stay, on the provision that they do something for him. His main interest is property development, and he needs a house cleared and cleaned. The team ends up demolishing the house. However, the landlord turns out to have changed his mind and decided to demolish it and replace it with a luxury block of flats, so all ends well.

== Cast ==
- Sidney James as Bert Handy
- Kenneth Connor as Sam Twist
- Charles Hawtrey as Gabriel Dimple
- Kenneth Williams as Francis Courtenay
- "Professor" Stanley Unwin as Landlord
- Joan Sims as Lily Duveen
- Liz Fraser as Delia King
- Terence Longdon as Montgomery Infield-Hopping
- Bill Owen as Mike Weston
- Esma Cannon as Miss Cooling
- Freddie Mills as 'Lefty' Vincent
- Fenella Fielding as Penny Panting
- Hattie Jacques as Sister
- Joan Hickson as Matron
- June Jago as Nurse
- Sydney Tafler as Strip Club Manager
- Judith Furse as Headmistress
- Howard Marion-Crawford as Wine-tasting organiser
- Jimmy Thompson as Mr Delling
- Patrick Cargill as Raffish Exhibition Customer
- Molly Weir as Bird woman
- Kynaston Reeves as Sir Theodore
- David Lodge as Connoisseur
- Jerry Desmonde as Martin Paul
- Ambrosine Phillpotts as Yoki's owner
- Nicholas Parsons as Wolf
- Cyril Chamberlain as Policeman
- Cyril Raymond as Army officer
- Eric Pohlmann as Sinister man
- Julia Arnall as Trudy Trelawney
- Terence Alexander as Trevor Trelawney
- Victor Maddern as First sinister passenger
- Norman Rossington as Boxing referee

== Crew ==
- Screenplay – Norman Hudis
- Music – Bruce Montgomery
- Art Director – Lionel Couch
- Director of Photography – Alan Hume
- Editor – John Shirley
- Associate Producer – Basil Keys
- Assistant Director – Jack Causey
- Camera Operator – Dudley Lovell
- Sound Editor – Arthur Ridout
- Sound Recordists – Robert T MacPhee & Gordon McCallum
- Unit Manager – Claude Watson
- Hairdressing – Biddy Crystal
- Continuity – Gladys Goldsmith
- Make-up – George Blackler
- Costume Designer – Joan Ellacott
- Casting Director – Betty White
- Producer – Peter Rogers
- Director – Gerald Thomas

== Filming and locations ==
- Filming dates – 28 November 1960 – 17 January 1961

Interiors:

- Pinewood Studios, Buckinghamshire

Exteriors:

- The corner of Park Street and Sheet Street in Windsor, Berkshire, doubled for the Helping Hand Agency. The location was used again a decade later for the Wedded Bliss agency in Carry On Loving.

== Reception ==
The film was one of the most popular of the year at the British box office.

Variety wrote, "Ingenuity of scriptwriter Norman Hudis is sometimes a bit strained, but he has come up with some sound comedy situations. Hudis' dialog is also lively, relying on a great deal of double meanings, saucy vulgarity and the various personalities of the lengthy cast. Even down to the smallest one, the roles are played by actors well experienced in jumping through the comedy hoops that director Gerald Thomas tosses deftly in the air." Margaret Harford of the Los Angeles Times wrote that the film "is too scrambled to be consistently funny but regular addicts of the series will enjoy the obvious humor inherent in any outfit labeled the Helping Hand Employment Agency." The Monthly Film Bulletin opined that "mostly the gags have long since grown old gracelessly in the hallowed tradition of British music-hall and farce. This comedy seems staler, less yeasty than, say, Carry On Nurse. But the series has worked up such popular appeal it can probably coast along on that momentum very nicely for some time, before the public finally calls its bluff."

== Bibliography ==
- Davidson, Andy (2012). Carry On Confidential. London: Miwk. ISBN 978-1-908630-01-8.
- Sheridan, Simon (2011). Keeping the British End Up – Four Decades of Saucy Cinema. London: Titan Books. ISBN 978-0-85768-279-6.
- Webber, Richard (2009). 50 Years of Carry On. London: Arrow. ISBN 978-0-09-949007-4.
- Hudis, Norman (2008). No Laughing Matter. London: Apex. ISBN 978-1-906358-15-0.
- Keeping the British End Up: Four Decades of Saucy Cinema by Simon Sheridan (third edition) (2007) (Reynolds & Hearn Books)
- Ross, Robert (2002). The Carry On Companion. London: Batsford. ISBN 978-0-7134-8771-8.
- Bright, Morris; Ross, Robert (2000). Mr Carry On – The Life & Work of Peter Rogers. London: BBC Books. ISBN 978-0-563-55183-6.
- Rigelsford, Adrian (1996). Carry On Laughing – a celebration. London: Virgin. ISBN 978-1-85227-554-9.
- Hibbin, Sally & Nina (1988). What a Carry On. London: Hamlyn. ISBN 978-0-600-55819-4.
- Eastaugh, Kenneth (1978). The Carry On Book. London: David & Charles. ISBN 978-0-7153-7403-0.
