= Carry On Cruising =

1962 British comedy film by Gerald Thomas

- Original UK quad poster
- Directed by: Gerald Thomas; Ralph Thomas (uncredited)
- Screenplay by: Norman Hudis
- Story by: Eric Barker
- Produced by: Peter Rogers
- Starring: Sid James; Kenneth Williams; Kenneth Connor; Liz Fraser; Dilys Laye; Esma Cannon; Lance Percival
- Cinematography: Alan Hume
- Edited by: John Shirley
- Music by: Bruce Montgomery; Douglas Gamley
- Distributed by: Anglo-Amalgamated
- Release date: 13 April 1962
- Running time: 86 mins.
- Country: United Kingdom
- Language: English
- Budget: £140,000 or $500,000

Carry On Cruising is a 1962 British comedy film, the sixth in the series of 31 Carry On films (1958–1992). It was based on an original story by Eric Barker. P&O – Orient Lines were thanked in the credits. Regulars Sid James, Kenneth Williams and Kenneth Connor appear in the film, whereas Joan Sims and Charles Hawtrey do not. Sims took ill shortly before filming began and was replaced by Dilys Laye, making her Carry On debut, at four days' notice. Hawtrey was dropped for demanding star billing and more money, but returned for the next entry, making this the only entry during Hawtrey's 23-film run which he missed. Sims returned two years later in Carry On Cleo. Liz Fraser notches up the second of her four appearances here. Lance Percival makes his only appearance in the series in Carry On Cruising, playing the ship's chef, the role originally designated for Hawtrey. The Australian actor Vincent Ball also makes his first, of two, Carry On appearances. This was the last film to have its screenplay written by Norman Hudis. This film was notable for being the first in the series to be filmed in colour. The film was followed by Carry On Cabby (1963).

== Plot ==
Five members of Captain Crowther's crew are replaced on short notice before a new cruise voyage begins. The new crew proves to be incompetent and are poor sailors, and the passengers as well.

Crowther, captaining the SS Happy Wanderer cruise ship, hopes to get a job as captain on a transatlantic ship following this voyage. He promises the cruise crew members that their jobs will be safe under the new captain. Setting off from England, the Happy Wanderer docks at unnamed ports in Spain, Italy and North Africa before heading home.

Single ladies Gladys and Flo take the cruise, Flo hoping to find a husband. Bridget is her usual dotty and entertaining self. One unnamed passenger never disembarks but always goes straight to the bar to drink to forget an unidentified woman. The crew and passengers settle in as the ship leaves port, where head chef Wilfred Haines discovers he gets easily seasick. Mario Fabrizi makes a quick appearance as one of the cooks under Haines. Ed Devereaux, best known for the part of Matt Hammond in the Australian TV series 'Skippy', appears as a young officer.

Gladys and Flo fall for the PT instructor Mr. Jenkins, though nothing comes of it, especially when Flo turns out to be hopeless in the gym. Meanwhile, the new men try to impress Crowther, but disasters follow when he is knocked out and covered with food at a party.

Meanwhile, ship's doctor Dr. Binn has fallen for Flo, but she wants nothing to do with him. He serenades her with a song after leaving Italy (Bella Marie), which she does not hear, as she is asleep. Gladys, who has heard the song, realises that Flo is in love with Binn. With the help of First Officer Marjoribanks, she arranges a plot for Binn and Flo to get together. It works, and the confident Binn finally confesses his feelings to a gobsmacked Flo, who returns his affections.

Crowther lets the five newcomers know that they have improved since the cruise began, simply by doing their jobs and not by trying to impress him. They learn that the captain has been in charge of the Happy Wanderer for ten years and decide to hold a surprise party for him. Haines bakes him a many-flavoured cake, and the barman cables the former barman for the recipe of the captain's favourite drink, the Aberdeen Angus.

The party goes well, and Crowther receives a telegram telling him he has been granted captaincy of a new ship. He turns it down, as he recognises it does not have the personal touch of a cruise ship, and prefers the company of his own crew.

== Cast ==
- Sid James as Captain Wellington Crowther
- Kenneth Williams as First Officer Leonard Marjoribanks
- Kenneth Connor as Dr Arthur Binn
- Liz Fraser as Glad Trimble
- Dilys Laye as Flo Castle
- Esma Cannon as Bridget Madderley
- Lance Percival as Wilfred Haines, Ship's Cook.
- Jimmy Thompson as Sam Turner
- Ronnie Stevens as Drunk
- Vincent Ball as Jenkins
- Cyril Chamberlain as Tom Tree
- Willoughby Goddard as Large Man
- Ed Devereaux as Young officer
- Brian Rawlinson as Steward
- Anton Rodgers as Young man
- Anthony Sagar as Cook
- Terence Holland as Passer-by
- Mario Fabrizi as Cook
- Evan David as Bridegroom
- Marian Collins as Bride
- Jill Mai Meredith as Shapely miss
- Alan Casley as Kindly seaman
- Norman Coburn as Wireless Operator

== Crew ==
- Screenplay – Norman Hudis
- Story – Eric Barker
- Music – Bruce Montgomery & Douglas Gamley
- Director of Photography – Alan Hume
- Art Director – Carmen Dillon
- Editor – John Shirley
- Production Manager – Bill Hill
- Camera Operator – Dudley Lovell
- Assistant Director – Jack Causey
- Sound Editors – Arthur Ridout & Archie Ludski
- Sound Recordists – Robert T MacPhee & Bill Daniels
- Continuity – Penny Daniels
- Make-up – George Blackler & Geoffrey Rodway
- Hairdressing – Biddy Crystal
- Costume Designer – Joan Ellacott
- Casting Director – Betty White
- Beachwear – Silhouette (lingerie)
- Producer – Peter Rogers
- Director – Gerald Thomas

== Filming and locations ==
- Filming dates – 8 January-16 February 1962

Interiors:

- Pinewood Studios, Buckinghamshire, England

Exteriors

- Tilbury Docks

== Reception ==
The film was the 12th most popular film at the British box office in 1962. According to Kinematograph Weekly the film was considered a "money maker" at the British box office in 1962.

== Bibliography ==
- Davidson, Andy (2012). Carry On Confidential. London: Miwk. ISBN 978-1908630018.
- Sheridan, Simon (2011). Keeping the British End Up – Four Decades of Saucy Cinema. London: Titan Books. ISBN 978-0857682796.
- Webber, Richard (2009). 50 Years of Carry On. London: Arrow. ISBN 978-0099490074.
- Hudis, Norman (2008). No Laughing Matter. London: Apex. ISBN 978-1906358150.
- Keeping the British End Up: Four Decades of Saucy Cinema by Simon Sheridan (third edition) (2007) (Reynolds & Hearn Books)
- Ross, Robert (2002). The Carry On Companion. London: Batsford. ISBN 978-0713487718.
- Bright, Morris; Ross, Robert (2000). Mr Carry On – The Life & Work of Peter Rogers. London: BBC Books. ISBN 978-0563551836.
- Rigelsford, Adrian (1996). Carry On Laughing – a celebration. London: Virgin. ISBN 1-85227-554-5.
- Hibbin, Sally & Nina (1988). What a Carry On. London: Hamlyn. ISBN 978-0600558194.
- Eastaugh, Kenneth (1978). The Carry On Book. London: David & Charles. ISBN 978-0715374030.
