= Jimmy Logan =

Scottish performer, producer, impresario and director (1928–2001)

Jimmy Logan OBE FRSAMD
- Born: James Allan Short; 4 April 1928; Dennistoun, Glasgow, Scotland
- Died: 13 April 2001 (aged 73); Clydebank, West Dunbartonshire, Scotland
- Occupations: Performer; Theatrical producer Impresario; Theatre director
- Years active: 1944–2001
- Spouses: Grace Pagan (m. 1948; div. 1969) Gina Fratini (m. 1969; div. 1977) Pamela Donald (m. 1985; div. 1991) Angela Mackenzie (m. 1992)

James Allan Short, OBE, FRSAMD (4 April 1928 – 13 April 2001), known professionally as Jimmy Logan, was a Scottish performer, theatrical producer, impresario and director.

== Family ==
Logan was born in Dennistoun, Glasgow, a member of a family of entertainers; the tradition began with his parents (Jack Short and Mary Dalziel "May" Allan) who were the music hall act Short and Dalziel. His aunt, from whom he took his stage surname, was Broadway performer Ella Logan. He had four siblings including actress/singer Annie Ross.

== Career ==
Educated at Gourock High School, Inverclyde, and latterly Bellahouston Academy, Glasgow, Logan left school at the age of 14. His family, in the 1930s and 1940s, toured the small music halls of Scotland and Northern Ireland and ran seasons at the Metropole, Glasgow and in the Theatre, Paisley, where Logan became house manager for the family. He was in pantomime by 1944, playing the cat in Dick Whittington and His Cat, and soon became a comedy star with BBC Scotland. His connection with pantomime continued throughout his life, most famously with the long-running pantomimes produced by Howard & Wyndham in Glasgow, Edinburgh, Newcastle and Aberdeen.

Logan, starring with Jack Radcliffe and Eve Boswell, held the record number of performances of the famed Five Past Eight shows staged each summer at the Alhambra Theatre. Logan purchased the Empress Theatre for £80,000 in 1964. He refurbished it, reopening it as the New Metropole. One of the last events to be staged there was the first Scottish production of the rock musical Hair.

His first acting role was in the film Floodtide (1949), a drama set on Clydeside.

His other film roles included The Wild Affair (1964), Carry On Abroad (1972), Carry On Girls (1973), Living Apart Together (1982), Captain Jack (1999), and The Debt Collector (1999) with Billy Connolly. His London stage debut came in The Mating Game (1973).

He staged an adaptation of Oor Wullie, the Sunday Post comic strip character, for the Dundee stage. His one-man musical based on the life of Scottish entertainer Sir Harry Lauder was called Lauder (1976). Logan collected Lauder memorabilia, which is now housed in the Scottish Theatre Archive at the University of Glasgow.

Other theatrical events included The Entertainer (1984), Brighton Beach Memoirs (1989), Bill Bryden's The Ship, The Comedians (1991), On Golden Pond (1996) and Death of a Salesman at the Pitlochry Festival (1992). In 1991, he had a supporting role in the Swedish comedy film Den ofrivillige golfaren which was partly filmed in Scotland.

Logan was awarded an honorary doctorate by Glasgow Caledonian University (1994), honoured with the Officer of the Order of the British Empire (OBE) for "services to Scottish theatre" in 1996, and was elected a fellow of the Royal Scottish Academy of Music and Drama in 1998.

His last two performances were at Pitlochry Festival Theatre and Glasgow's Pavilion Theatre respectively. An extensive archive of his personal papers and performance ephemera is now held by the Royal Conservatoire of Scotland archives.

Logan published his autobiography, It's a Funny Life, in 1998.

== Theatre ==
Year	Title	Role	Company	Director	Notes
1990	The Ship	George	The Ship's Company, Govan	Bill Bryden	play by Bill Bryden
1994	The Big Picnic	Colours	Promenade Productions	Bill Bryden	play by Bill Bryden

== Death ==
Logan died of cancer in a hospital in Clydebank, West Dunbartonshire, Scotland, nine days after his 73rd birthday.
