= Our House (1960 TV series) =

British TV sitcom (1960–1962)

- Genre: Sitcom
- Created by: Norman Hudis
- Starring: Hattie Jacques; Charles Hawtrey; Frederick Peisley; Leigh Madison; Trader Faulkner (series 1); Ida de la Haye (series 1); Frank Pettingell (series 1); Norman Rossington (series 1); Joan Sims (series 1); Hylda Baker (series 2); Bernard Bresslaw (series 2); Eugenie Cavanagh (series 2)
- Country of origin: United Kingdom
- Original language: English
- No. of series: 2
- No. of episodes: 39

Production
- Producer: Ernest Maxin
- Running time: 45 minutes (26 episodes); 55 minutes (13 episodes)
- Production company: ABC

Original release
- Network: ITV
- Release: 11 September 1960 – 21 April 1962

Our House is a British sitcom that aired on ITV from 1960 to 1962. The main writer of the programme, which starred many actors known for their roles in the Carry On films, was Norman Hudis, who wrote the first six Carry On films from 1958 to 1962. Our House is based on the premise of nine people of differing backgrounds sharing a house together.

== Production ==
Our House was created by Norman Hudis, who was also the main writer. Two other writers contributed to the series, Brad Ashton and Bob Block. It was produced by Ernest Maxin. Episodes were recorded in front of a live audience at ABC's Teddington Studios. The theme music was composed by Maxin and performed by Johnny Gregory.

== Cast ==
- Hattie Jacques - Georgina Ruddy
- Charles Hawtrey - Simon Willow
- Frederick Peisley - Herbert Keene
- Leigh Madison - Marcia Hatton
- Trader Faulkner - Stephen Hatton (series 1)
- Joan Sims - Daisy Burke (series 1)
- Norman Rossington - Gordon Brent (series 1)
- Frank Pettingell - Captain Illiffe (series 1)
- Ina De La Haye - Mrs Illiffe (series 1)
- Bernard Bresslaw - William Singer (series 2)
- Hylda Baker - Henrietta (series 2)
- Eugenie Cavanagh - Marina (series 2)

The last surviving cast member, Eugenie Cavanagh, died in March 2024.

== Plot ==
Nine people - two couples and five individuals - find themselves at an estate agents in desperate need of a place to live. With none being able to buy a property alone, they decide to pool their money and buy one large house together. Georgina is a librarian who, forced to remain quiet at work, is loud when at home. Simon is a likeable loner who works in the local council's rates office whilst Daisy goes from one job to another quickly. Gordon is a law student and Herbert a shy, single bank clerk. Captain Illiffe is a retired naval captain and his wife a violinist. Stephen and Marcia Hatton are newly-weds.

== Episodes ==
The first series of Our House aired on ITV in late 1960 on Sundays at 3.25pm. The series consisted of 13 episodes, each 55 minutes long. The second series broadcast for 26 45-minute episodes from 1961 to 1962 on Saturdays at 7.40pm. The first seven episodes of series two aired fortnightly across the entire ITV network. However, the remaining episodes - which aired weekly - were not shown in the London region.

Out of a total of 39 episodes, only three are known to have survived in the archives. The three surviving episodes are "Simply Simon", "A Thin Time" and "Love to Georgina", all from the first series. The surviving episodes have not been seen on British television since 1962.

=== Series One ===
#	Episode Title	Original Broadcast Date
1	"Moving In"	11 September 1960
2	"Simply Simon"	18 September 1960
3	"A Thin Time"	25 September 1960
4	"The Man Who Knew Nothing"	2 October 1960
5	"Annie Does Live Here"	9 October 1960
6	"Surprise for Stephen"	16 October 1960
7	"All in a Good Cause"	23 October 1960
8	"To Please Louise"	31 October 1960
9	"Speechless"	6 November 1960
10	"Day-Time"	13 November 1960
11	"Love to Georgina"	20 November 1960
12	"Things of the Past"	27 November 1960
13	"And Then There Was One"	4 December 1960

=== Series Two ===
#	Episode Title	Original Broadcast Date
1	"Not for Sale"	16 September 1961
2	"Vote for Georgina"	30 September 1961
3	"A Quiet Time"	14 October 1961
4	"Revolution in Walthamstow"	28 October 1961
5	"Best Man"	11 November 1961
6	"Battle of the Borough"	25 November 1961
7	"Knocko"	9 December 1961
8	"Willow the Winger"	16 December 1961
9	"Complications of the Season"	23 December 1961
10	"Treble Mischance"	30 December 1961
11	"Where is Everybody?"	6 January 1962
12	"Riviera Incident"	13 January 1962
13	"Georgina Goes to Press"	20 January 1962
14	"Simon Comes to Stay"	27 January 1962
15	"Hobbies Galore"	3 February 1962
16	"There's No Business Like..."	10 February 1962
17	"Off the Rails"	17 February 1962
18	"The Tooth Will Out!"	24 February 1962
19	"Economy Wave"	3 March 1962
20	"Horse Power"	10 March 1962
21	"Uncle Silas"	17 March 1962
22	"The Den of Vice"	24 March 1962
23	"First Night"	31 March 1962
24	"Safari"	7 April 1962
25	"Oh, Julie!"	14 April 1962
26	"Talking Shop"	21 April 1962

== DVD releases ==
The three surviving episodes of Our House were released on DVD on 16 July 2012.
