= Carry On Henry =

1971 British comedy film by Gerald Thomas

- Original UK quad poster by Renato Fratini
- Directed by: Gerald Thomas
- Written by: Talbot Rothwell
- Produced by: Peter Rogers
- Starring: Sid James; Kenneth Williams; Charles Hawtrey; Joan Sims; Terry Scott; Barbara Windsor; Kenneth Connor
- Cinematography: Alan Hume
- Edited by: Alfred Roome
- Music by: Eric Rogers
- Distributed by: Rank Organisation
- Release date: 17 February 1971
- Running time: 86 minutes
- Country: United Kingdom
- Language: English
- Budget: £214,500

Carry On Henry is a 1971 British historical comedy film, the 21st release in the series of 31 Carry On films (1958–1992). It tells a fictionalised story involving Sid James as Henry VIII, who chases after Barbara Windsor's character Bettina.

The film is based on the "secret history" concept, with a manuscript revealing that Henry VIII had two additional wives. A widowed Henry VIII has a marriage of state to Marie of Normandy, the favourite cousin of King Francis I of France. Henry does not consummate the marriage, because he is repulsed by her habit of eating garlic before coitus. Marie starts an extramarital affair with a courtier. When Henry realizes that his wife is pregnant by another man, he tries to get rid of her without negating his alliance to Francis. He eventually agrees to acknowledge Marie's child as his own, but he is determined to marry his new love interest Catherine Howard. The film was followed by "Carry On at Your Convenience" in 1971.

== Plot ==
The film opens with a passage, which states:

This film is based on a recently discovered manuscript by one William Cobbler, which reveals that Henry VIII did in fact have two more wives. Although it was first thought that Cromwell originated the story, it is now known to be definitely all Cobbler's... from beginning to end.

Henry VIII has his wife beheaded, and immediately marries Marie of Normandy. The union was arranged at the behest of the bumbling Cardinal Wolsey, who selected Marie because she is the favourite cousin of King Francis I of France. Before the marriage can be consummated, Marie eats a clove of garlic, claiming it is a Normandy tradition to eat garlic before coitus. Henry is repulsed by the smell and leaves. Marie receives amorous advances from Henry's attaché Sir Roger de Lodgerley, which she accepts.

Henry is keen to be rid of Marie and seizes the opportunity to divorce her when he discovers she is pregnant with Lodgerley's child. He imprisons her in the Tower of London and commands Thomas Cromwell to obtain a confession of paternity from Lodgerley. Marie convinces Wolsey to send for the French ambassador, who tells Henry that Francis I is so thrilled with the successful marriage that he will give England fifty thousand gold pieces. This, and the fear that the ambassador will discover Marie's imprisonment, convinces Henry to release Marie; he commands Cromwell to force a retraction of Lodgerley's confession.

Soon afterwards, Henry meets the beautiful Bettina, the daughter of the Earl of Bristol (a punning reference to Bristols). Enamoured, Henry renews his attempt to divorce Marie just as Lodgerley signs his retraction, again imprisoning Marie in the Tower. Henry comes so close to achieving the divorce that he sends Bettina to the bridal bedchamber. The handsome King Francis of France arrives on a surprise visit and finds Bettina; finding her to be a suitable wife, he asks Henry if he can marry her. Henry realises that the only way to avoid war with France is to consent. Henry arranges for Cromwell and Wolsey to be executed as a result of their supposed inaction.

Charmed by Henry's loyalty, Marie announces that she loves him and goes into labour. Despite not being the biological father, Henry is moved by the birth of the child and promises to serve as a faithful husband and father, though he immediately meets Catherine Howard and resolves to marry her. He rushes to stop the execution of Cromwell and Wolsey, begging for their help in divorcing Marie and ensuring marriage with Howard, but both men cry out 'Carry on, executioner! Carry on!', deciding they would rather be beheaded than be part of anymore of Henry's schemes that would get them in further trouble, whilst Henry watches astonished.

== Cast ==
- Sid James as King Henry VIII
- Kenneth Williams as Thomas Cromwell
- Charles Hawtrey as Sir Roger de Lodgerley
- Joan Sims as Queen Marie of Normandy
- Terry Scott as Cardinal Wolsey
- Barbara Windsor as Bettina
- Kenneth Connor as Lord Hampton of Wick
- Julian Holloway as Sir Thomas
- Peter Gilmore as Francis, King of France
- Julian Orchard as Duc de Poncenay
- Gertan Klauber as Bidet
- David Davenport as Major-domo
- Margaret Nolan as Buxom lass
- William Mervyn as Dr Findlay, physician
- Norman Chappell as 1st plotter
- Derek Francis as Farmer
- Bill Maynard as Guy Fawkes
- Douglas Ridley as 2nd plotter
- Leon Greene as Torturer
- David Prowse as Torturer
- Monika Dietrich as Catherine Howard
- Billy Cornelius as Guard
- Marjie Lawrence as Serving maid
- Patsy Rowlands as Queen
- Alan Curtis as Conte di Pisa
- Peter Butterworth as Charles, Earl of Bristol (uncredited)
- John Bluthal as Royal tailor (uncredited)
- Bill McGuirk as Flunkey (uncredited)
- Jane Cardew as Henry's 2nd wife (uncredited)
- Valerie Shute as Maid (uncredited)
- Peter Rigby as Henry's courtier (uncredited)
- Trevor Roberts as Henry's courtier (uncredited)
- Peter Munt as Henry's courtier (uncredited)

== Production and casting ==
Sid James and Barbara Windsor feature alongside other regulars Kenneth Williams, Charles Hawtrey, Joan Sims, Terry Scott and Kenneth Connor. This was the first time that Williams and Connor appeared together since Carry On Cleo seven years previously. The original alternative title was to be Anne of a Thousand Lays, a pun on the Richard Burton film Anne of the Thousand Days, and Sid James wears exactly the same cloak that Burton wore in that film.

Sid James plays Henry VIII. Peter Rogers originally planned on using Harry Secombe in the title role, and in the first draft of the screenplay Henry was going to be an avid composer of madrigals, but the idea was shelved and Sid James took over the role. Two comedic madrigals written for the film but unused were later performed in the 1972 Carry On Christmas special and the 1973 stage show Carry On London.

== Filming and locations ==
- Filming dates: 12 October – 27 November 1970

Interiors:

- Pinewood Studios, Buckinghamshire

Exteriors:

- Windsor Great Park, Berkshire
- The Long Walk, Windsor Castle, Berkshire
- Knebworth House, Hertfordshire

== Theme music ==
The opening theme is a version of "Greensleeves", as arranged by Eric Rogers. The film was followed by Carry On at Your Convenience in 1971.

== Release ==
The film was released on 17 February 1971.

== See also ==
- Cultural depictions of Henry VIII

== Bibliography ==
- Davidson, Andy (2012). Carry On Confidential. London: Miwk. ISBN 978-1-908630-01-8.
- Sheridan, Simon (2011). Keeping the British End Up – Four Decades of Saucy Cinema. London: Titan Books. ISBN 978-0-85768-279-6.
- Webber, Richard (2009). 50 Years of Carry On. London: Arrow. ISBN 978-0-09-949007-4.
- Hudis, Norman (2008). No Laughing Matter. London: Apex. ISBN 978-1-906358-15-0.
- Keeping the British End Up: Four Decades of Saucy Cinema by Simon Sheridan (third edition) (2007) (Reynolds & Hearn Books)
- Ross, Robert (2002). The Carry On Companion. London: Batsford. ISBN 978-0-7134-8771-8.
- Bright, Morris; Ross, Robert (2000). Mr Carry On – The Life & Work of Peter Rogers. London: BBC Books. ISBN 978-0-563-55183-6.
- Rigelsford, Adrian (1996). Carry On Laughing – a celebration. London: Virgin. ISBN 1-85227-554-5.
- Hibbin, Sally & Nina (1988). What a Carry On. London: Hamlyn. ISBN 978-0-600-55819-4.
- Eastaugh, Kenneth (1978). The Carry On Book. London: David & Charles. ISBN 978-0-7153-7403-0.
