= Joan Sims =

English actress (1930–2001)

- Sims in 1957
- Born: Irene Joan Marion Sims; 9 May 1930; Laindon, Essex, England
- Died: 27 June 2001 (aged 71); Chelsea, London, England
- Occupation: Actress
- Years active: 1950–2000
- Known for: Carry On; Till Death Us Do Part; Sykes; As Time Goes By; On the Up

Irene Joan Marion Sims (9 May 1930 – 27 June 2001) was an English actress and comedienne, best remembered for her roles in the Carry On franchise, appearing in 24 of the films (the most for any actress).

On television, she is known for playing Gran in Till Death Us Do Part (1967–1975), Madge Kettlewell in Sykes (1972–1978), Mrs Bloomsbury-Barton in Worzel Gummidge (1979–1981), an eccentric youth hostel owner in Victoria Wood (1989), Mrs Wembley, the cook with a liking for sherry, in On the Up (1990–1992), and Madge Hardcastle in As Time Goes By (1994–1998).

== Early life and education ==
Sims was born on 9 May 1930, the only child of John Henry Sims (1888–1964), Station Master of Laindon railway station in Essex, and his wife Gladys Marie Sims, née Ladbrook (1896–1981). Sims's early interest in being an actress came from living at the railway station. She would often put on performances for waiting passengers. She decided that she wanted to pursue show business during her teens, and soon became a familiar face in a growing number of amateur productions locally. One of her first stage appearances was as Miranda Bute in the Langdon Players production of Esther McCracken's comedy Quiet Wedding in May 1946.

In 1946, Sims first applied to Royal Academy of Dramatic Art (RADA), but her audition was unsuccessful. Her first audition included a rendition of Winnie the Pooh. She did succeed in being admitted to PARADA, the academy's preparatory school, and after her successful fourth attempt, she joined and was trained at RADA, graduating in 1950 at the age of 19. One of her first stage performances was in the 1951 pantomime, The Happy Ha'penny, opposite Stanley Baxter at Glasgow's Citizens Theatre.

== Career ==
=== Early work ===
Sims made her first film appearance in Will Any Gentleman? with George Cole in 1953, closely followed by Trouble in Store with Norman Wisdom. In 1954, she appeared as Miss Dawn in The Belles of St. Trinian's, and made an appearance in Doctor in the House, opposite Dirk Bogarde as the sexually repressed Nurse Rigor Mortis. Sims became a regular in the Doctor series, which was produced by Betty E. Box, and was hence spotted by Box's husband Peter Rogers.

She had a small part in the 1957 film Carry On Admiral, unrelated to the later Carry On series and with no other cast members in common with the series.

=== Carry On films ===
In 1958, Sims received a script from Peter Rogers; it was for Carry On Nurse. The film Carry On Sergeant had been a huge success at the box office and in the autumn of that year, Rogers and director Gerald Thomas began planning a follow-up.

She first starred in Carry On Nurse, then Carry On Teacher, followed by Carry On Constable and Carry On Regardless, and this sealed her future as a regular Carry On performer. Sims would also have a main role in the television sitcom Our House which starred her fellow Carry On contemporaries Hattie Jacques, Charles Hawtrey and Bernard Bresslaw. Following a bout of ill health, Dilys Laye had to be brought in to take her place in Carry On Cruising at very short notice; however, Sims rejoined the team with Carry On Cleo. Sims would go on to make an unbroken consistent run of Carry On roles from 1964 until 1978 when the series ended, including Carry On Cowboy, Carry On Screaming, Carry On Doctor, Carry On Up the Khyber, Carry On Camping, Carry On At Your Convenience and Carry On Abroad.

Interspersed with her Carry On roles, Sims also became a regular in the Doctor comedy film series, appearing in Doctor in Love, Doctor in Clover and Doctor in Trouble. Sims also had roles in a number of films that featured many of her Carry On co-stars but were not part of the film series, including Please Turn Over, Watch Your Stern, Twice Round the Daffodils, Nurse on Wheels, San Ferry Ann, The Big Job, and latterly Not Now, Darling and Don't Just Lie There, Say Something!.

=== Later work ===
After the Carry On series ended in 1978, Sims continued to work on television. She appeared opposite Katharine Hepburn and Laurence Olivier in the 1975 television film Love Among the Ruins and had a recurring role as Gran in the BBC comedy series Till Death Us Do Part, although she was only in her late thirties when she assumed the role.

From 1979 to 1980, she played the recurring character Mrs Bloomsbury-Barton in Worzel Gummidge for Southern Television. In 1980, Sims played Amelia Dyer in an episode of the Granada Television series Lady Killers. During 1986 and 1987, Sims starred as Annie Begley alongside Angela Thorne in the Yorkshire Television sitcom Farrington of the F.O. In 1986, Sims appeared in the BBC science fiction series Doctor Who in the four episodes of The Trial of a Time Lord: The Mysterious Planet as Katryca. She also played Miss Murgatroyd in the Miss Marple adaptation A Murder is Announced (1985) and Lady Fox-Custard in Simon and the Witch (1987).

In 1989, she appeared as a medium in the video for Morrissey's "Ouija Board, Ouija Board".

She played Mrs Wembley in the BBC comedy series On the Up, which starred Dennis Waterman and ran from 1990 to 1992. From 1994, she played Madge Hardcastle, fun-loving wife to Rocky Hardcastle played by Frank Middlemass, and stepmother of Geoffrey Palmer's character Lionel in As Time Goes By. She also played Betsey Prig in an adaptation of Dickens' Martin Chuzzlewit (1994).

== Music career ==
During 1963, Sims made several recordings. "Hurry Up Gran" / "Oh Not Again Ken" was issued as a single, followed by "Spring Song" / "Men". Both were produced by George Martin for the Parlophone label but neither single made an impact on the UK Singles Chart. This did not deter her from releasing a third and final single during 1967, "Sweet Lovely Whatsisname" / "The Lass With the Delicate Hair". Again it failed to chart, and as a result the singles are now quite rare. As of 2009, both "Spring Song" and "Men" are available for the first time through iTunes and other download services, as well as on CD as part of re-issues of the comedy compilation albums Oh! What a Carry On! and Laugh A Minute. Sims also featured on an original cast recording of The Lord Chamberlain Regrets in 1961, as well as The Water Gypsies.

== Personal life ==
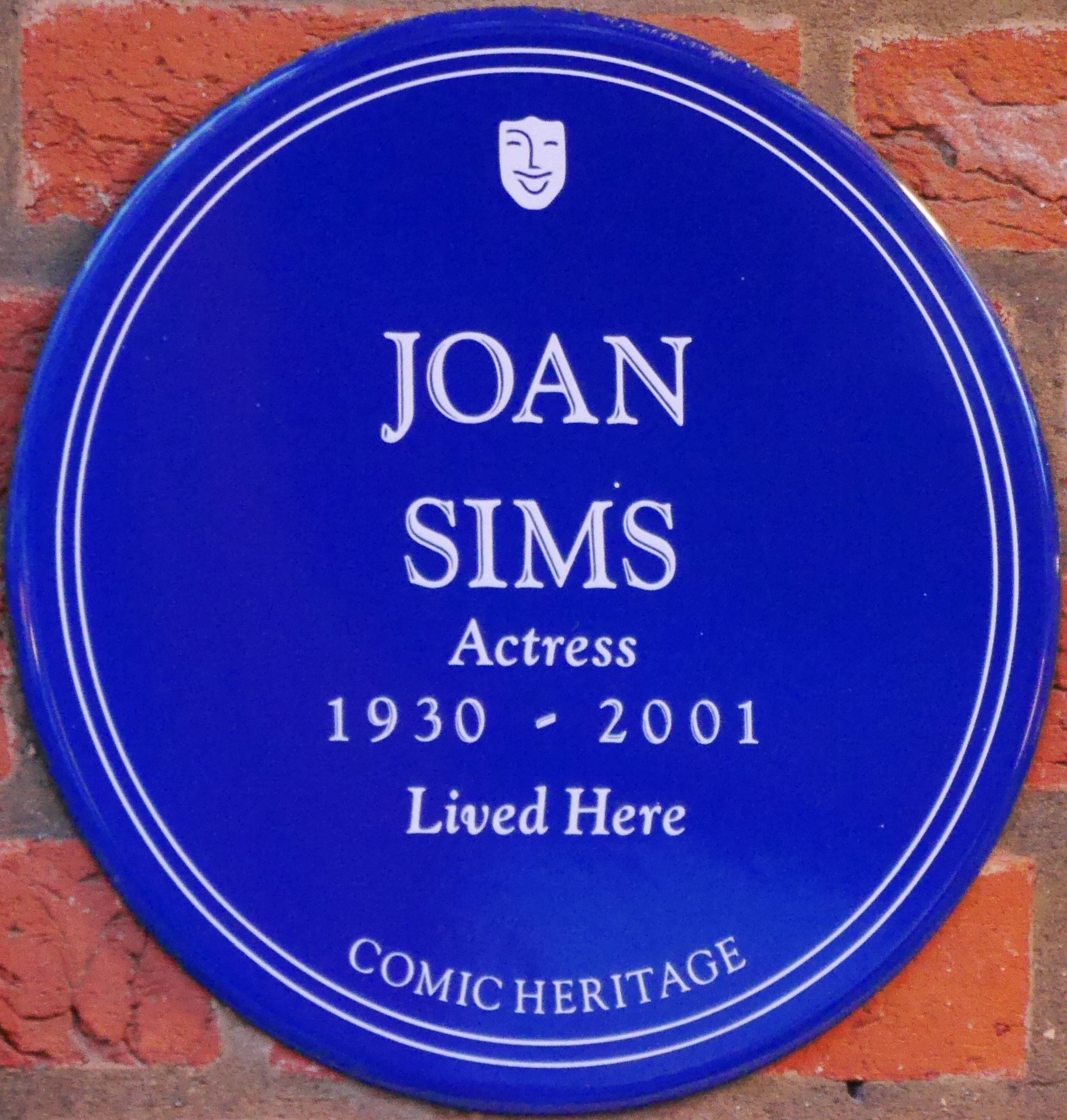
Plaque at Esmond Court, Thackeray Street, Kensington, London

Sims, like her fellow Carry On star Kenneth Williams, never married. Williams, who was homosexual, had proposed a marriage of convenience to her, which she declined. From 1958, she lived for three years with fellow actor Tony Baird but, every time her parents visited, she asked Baird to remove all of his belongings from their London flat.

After she told her mother on a visit that she was living with Baird, her father wrote her a stern letter, condemning the relationship. Sims replied, telling her parents that they had to come to terms with Baird being an extremely important part of her life. For the next six months she had no contact with her parents. Sims was a devoted daughter and found the separation from her parents difficult.

The relationship with Baird began to founder, Sims said, due to her success and Tony Baird's failure as an actor. Sims wrote:

Had house husbands been in vogue in those days we'd have made an excellent couple, since Tony was not very successful as an actor and I soon became the main breadwinner. If we had been able to accept that I would go out and earn the money and he would concentrate on running the home, things might have turned out better... For three years I was besotted with this loveable reprobate, but then the icing on the cake began to chip off and the love started to wear thin. I was virtually keeping him and the friction of the situation was getting harder to bear.

Of the break-up, which was finally triggered by Sims returning from a tour to find Baird had not done any washing or housework, she wrote "I could tell that he was genuinely heartbroken, and so was I, but I had to do it for my own survival."

Following this came a relationship with John Walters whom Sims had known for a long time. He had been assistant stage manager for the revue High Spirits, in which she appeared. They had had an 'innocent' romance at the time, but they embarked on a more serious relationship after Sims's break-up with Baird. However, Sims never felt it would be a long-term relationship: Walters was a much moodier character than Baird. During what she described as the 'one broody phase of my life', they discussed marriage and children, but it came to nothing and the relationship, the last serious one of Sims's life, ended after around two years of living together.

I never married because the right person never came along... I leave others to seek for darker explanations. For me it's extremely simple!

In 2000 her autobiography High Spirits was released.

=== Health ===
Sims had depression for many of her later years. This was worsened by the deaths of her agent Peter Eade, her best friend Hattie Jacques and her mother, all within a two-year period, after which she fell into alcoholism. Sims suffered from Bell's palsy in 1999 and fractured her hip in 2000, but recovered well. However, her alcoholism was beginning to dominate life in her rented Kensington flat, and she described herself as "the queen of puddings". After assessment by a doctor, she was offered a place in a rehabilitation centre, but declined.

== Death ==
Sims was admitted to hospital in November 2000, and complications of a routine operation caused her to slip into a coma.

Sims died on 27 June 2001 from liver failure and diverticulitis, with diabetes and COPD cited as contributory factors. She was cremated at Putney Vale Crematorium, and her ashes scattered in the grounds there.

Her authorised biography, Too Happy A Face, by Andrew Ross, was published in 2014.

== In popular culture ==
Sims was played by Chrissie Cotterill in the 2000 television film, Cor, Blimey!, an adaptation of Terry Johnson's play Cleo, Camping, Emmanuelle and Dick, and by Beatie Edney in the 2006 television film Kenneth Williams: Fantabulosa!

== Selected filmography ==
- The Square Ring (1953)
- Will Any Gentleman...? (1953)
- Trouble in Store (1953)
- Meet Mr Lucifer (1953)
- Doctor in the House (1954)
- What Every Woman Wants (1954)
- The Young Lovers (1954)
- The Belles of St. Trinian's (1954)
- To Dorothy a Son (1954)
- The Sea Shall Not Have Them (1954)
- The Adventures of Robin Hood (TV series) (1955) 1 episode "The Sheriff's Boots"
- As Long as They're Happy (1955)
- Colonel March Investigates (1955)
- Doctor at Sea (1955)
- The Buccaneers (TV series) (1956) 2 episodes "Dan Tempest and The Amazons" and "Cutlass Wedding"
- Stars in Your Eyes (1956)
- Lost (1956)
- The Silken Affair (1956)
- Keep It Clean (1956)
- Dry Rot (1956)
- Carry On Admiral (1957)
- Just My Luck (1957)
- The Naked Truth (1957)
- No Time for Tears (1957)
- Davy (1958)
- Passport to Shame (1958)
- Please Turn Over (1959)
- Carry On Nurse (1959)
- The Captain's Table (1959)
- Life in Emergency Ward 10 (1959)
- Upstairs and Downstairs (1959)
- Carry On Teacher (1959)
- Watch Your Stern (1960)
- Carry On Constable (1960)
- Doctor in Love (1960)
- His and Hers (1961)
- Carry On Regardless (1961)
- Mr. Topaze (1961)
- No My Darling Daughter (1961)
- The Iron Maiden (1962)
- A Pair of Briefs (1962)
- Twice Round the Daffodils (1962)
- Nurse on Wheels (1963)
- Strictly for the Birds (1963)
- Carry On Cleo (1964)
- San Ferry Ann (1965)
- The Big Job (1965)
- Carry On Cowboy (1965)
- Doctor in Clover (1966)
- Carry On Screaming! (1966)
- Don't Lose Your Head (1966)
- Follow That Camel (1967)
- Carry On Doctor (1967)
- Carry On Up the Khyber (1968)
- Carry On Camping (1969)
- Carry On Again Doctor (1969)
- Carry On Up the Jungle (1970)
- Doctor in Trouble (1970)
- Carry On Loving (1970)
- Carry On Henry (1971)
- The Magnificent Seven Deadly Sins (1971)
- Carry On at Your Convenience (1971)
- Carry On Matron (1972)
- The Alf Garnett Saga (1972)
- Carry On Abroad (1972)
- Don't Just Lie There, Say Something! (1973)
- Carry On Girls (1973)
- Not Now, Darling (1974)
- Carry On Dick (1974)
- A Journey to London (1975, TV film)
- Love Among the Ruins (1975, TV film)
- One of Our Dinosaurs Is Missing (1975)
- Carry On Behind (1975)
- Carry On England (1976)
- Carry On Emmannuelle (1978)
- Lady Killers (1980–1981)
- Hay Fever (1984, TV film)
- A Murder Is Announced (1985, TV film)
- Farrington of the F.O. (1986, TV series)
- Doctor Who – The Trial of a Time Lord (Parts 1–4: "The Mysterious Planet") (1986)
- Only Fools and Horses – "The Frog's Legacy" (Christmas Special) (1987)
- Victoria Wood – Episode 5 "Val de Ree (Ha Ha Ha Ha Ha)" (1989)
- The Fool (1990)
- On the Up (1990–1992)
- The Thief and the Cobbler (1993)
- One Foot in the Algarve (1993)
- As Time Goes By (1994–1998)
- The Canterville Ghost (1996, TV film)
- Hetty Wainthropp Investigates (1997)
- The Last of the Blonde Bombshells (2000, TV film)

== Stage work ==
In addition to her film and television work, Sims also appeared regularly on the British stage, particularly in pantomime. Documented appearances include the following productions:

Year(s)	Production	Role	Venue	Location	Source
1977–1978	Aladdin	–	Theatre Royal	Nottingham	
1979–1980	Cinderella	–	Churchill Theatre	Bromley	
1982–1983	Dick Whittington	–	Wyvern Theatre	Swindon	
1984–1985	Jack and the Beanstalk	–	Richmond Theatre	London	

Sims’ stage work, including pantomime, is also discussed in her authorised biography by Robert Ross, and in obituaries in The Guardian and The Daily Telegraph.

== Bibliography ==
- High Spirits by Joan Sims (ISBN 1-85225-280-4)
- Too Happy A Face – The Authorised Biography of Joan Sims by Andrew Ross (ISBN 1781961212, 978-1781961216)
