= Carry On Nurse =

1959 British comedy film by Gerald Thomas

- Original UK quad poster
- Directed by: Gerald Thomas
- Written by: Norman Hudis
- Produced by: Peter Rogers
- Starring: Shirley Eaton; Kenneth Connor; Charles Hawtrey; Hattie Jacques; Terence Longdon; Bill Owen; Leslie Phillips; Joan Sims; Susan Stephen; Kenneth Williams; Wilfrid Hyde-White; Susan Beaumont; Norman Rossington; Jill Ireland; Ann Firbank; Irene Handl; Susan Shaw; Michael Medwin
- Cinematography: Reginald Dwyer
- Edited by: John Shirley
- Music by: Bruce Montgomery
- Distributed by: Anglo-Amalgamated
- Release date: 5 March 1959
- Running time: 86 min.
- Country: United Kingdom
- Language: English
- Budget: £71,000
- Box office: $2.8 million (rentals)

Carry On Nurse is a 1959 British comedy film, the second in the series of 31 Carry On films (1958–1992). Of the regular team, it featured Joan Sims (in her Carry On film debut), Kenneth Williams, Kenneth Connor and Charles Hawtrey, with Hattie Jacques and Leslie Phillips. The film was written by Norman Hudis based on the play Ring for Catty by Patrick Cargill and Jack Beale. It was the top-grossing film of 1959 in the United Kingdom and, with an audience of 10.4 million, had the highest cinema viewing of any of the "Carry On" films. It was also highly successful in the United States, where it was reported that it played at some cinemas for three years. The film was followed by Carry On Teacher later in 1959.

== Plot ==
The journalist Ted York is rushed to Haven Hospital with appendicitis. The ambulance gets there quick, but only because the driver wants to know the result of a horse race. After being given a bed, Ted is smitten with Nurse Denton. The other nurses incessantly have to respond to the calls of the Colonel, who has a private room. He is a gambler and has his bets placed by Mick, the orderly.

That evening, the boxer Bernie Bishop is admitted after hurting his hand at the end of a bout. The next day, the Sister galvanises the nurses, orderly and patients for Matron's inspection. As usual, the Sister is let down by Nurse Dawson, a clumsy student nurse. Matron checks on the progress of the patients, and speaks to Mr. Hinton, who is forever listening to the radio with his headphones. Mick and the Colonel bet on how long the Matron will take on her rounds.

Ted is visited by his editor and agrees to write articles on his hospital experiences. He realises that Nurse Denton is in love with a doctor. However, her interest is not returned. Bernie is told that he will not be able to box for months. Nurse Dawson is sent to ring the bell to signal the end of visiting hours, but calls for the fire brigade by mistake.

The bookish Oliver Reckitt is visited by Jill, the sister of his friend Harry. They like each other, but are too shy to admit it. Bernie urges Oliver to admit how he really feels about her. Bernie's manager Ginger comes to visit him and says he must try to be more of a showman and not simply go for broke with every match. Nurse Dawson comes in early to sterilise rubber catheters, but is interrupted by the demanding Colonel. The catheters are put in a kidney dish to boil on the stove. Oliver is furious when the ward has to be cleared and tidied up for Matron's rounds as it upsets his schedule. When she arrives everyone begins to smell the forgotten catheters, which by now are burning on the stove. Matron stops to speak to Oliver, who complains about the disruptive effects that her visits have on the patients. Furious, Matron has the Sister make all the beds again.

Jack Bell arrives to have a bunion removed and is placed on the ward. Jill comes to see Oliver and they admit that they care for each other. She gives him a bar of nougat as a gift, but later that evening he becomes sick as a result of eating it. Mr. Able complains that he can not sleep because he has been missing his wife. He is put on medication, which makes him wildly excited, and he runs amok in the hospital. Eventually, Bernie subdues him with a quick punch.

Bell's operation is delayed, which upsets his plans for a romantic weekend. He offers the men in the ward the champagne he was going to drink with his girlfriend. They all get drunk and decide to remove the bunion themselves. They tie up the night nurse and Hinton pretends to be her while the others go to the operating theatre. Jack starts to panic as Oliver prepares to operate, but soon they are all giggling due to the laughing gas having been left on. The nurse arrives before any real damage is done.

The colonel plays a trick on Nurse Dawson and pins a piece of paper with a red 'L' on her back. Ted learns that Nurse Denton is applying for a job in America and tries to dissuade her. Jack catches a cold and is told that his operation will have to be postponed yet again. Oliver is discharged and leaves with Jill. Bernie is met by his wife and young son and they leave together. Ted is also discharged and makes a date with Nurse Denton. Nurse Dawson and Nurse Axwell decide to get even with the Colonel and replace a rectal thermometer with a daffodil. Luckily for them, upon her inspection, Matron manages to see the funny side.

== Cast ==
- Kenneth Connor as Bernie Bishop
- Shirley Eaton as Staff Nurse Dorothy Denton
- Charles Hawtrey as Humphrey Hinton
- Hattie Jacques as Matron
- Terence Longdon as Ted York
- Bill Owen as Percy Hickson
- Leslie Phillips as Jack Bell
- Joan Sims as Student Nurse Stella Dawson
- Susan Stephen as Nurse Georgie Axwell
- Kenneth Williams as Oliver Reckitt
- Wilfrid Hyde White as the Colonel
- Susan Beaumont as Nurse Frances James
- Ann Firbank as Staff Nurse Helen Lloyd
- Joan Hickson as Sister
- Cyril Chamberlain as Bert Able
- Harry Locke as Mick the Orderly
- Norman Rossington as Norm
- Brian Oulton as Henry Bray
- Susan Shaw as Mrs Jane Bishop
- Jill Ireland as Jill Thompson
- Irene Handl as Mrs Marge Hickson
- Michael Medwin as Ginger
- Leigh Madison as Doctor Winn
- John Van Eyssen as Mr Stephens, the surgeon
- Marianne Stone as Mrs Alice Able
- Rosalind Knight as Student Nurse Nightingale
- June Whitfield as Meg
- Hilda Fenemore as Mrs Rhoda Bray
- Frank Forsyth as John Gray
- Ed. Devereaux as Alec Lawrence
- Martin Boddey as Perkins
- Fred Griffiths as Second Ambulance Man
- John Mathews as Tom Mayhew
- Graham Stewart as George Field
- Marita Stanton as Nurse Rose Harper
- Patrick Durkin as Jackson
- Anthony Sagar as First Ambulance Man
- Shane Cordell as Attractive Nurse
- Christine Ozanne as Cleaner
- Lucy Griffiths as Trolley Lady
- Charles Stanley as Porter
- David Williams as Andrew Newman
- Bernard Bresslaw (uncredited): his feet were used as stand-ins for Terence Longdon's, when the latter's character was supposedly standing in a bath.
- Angela Browne as Young Nurse (uncredited)
- Raymond Glendenning as Racing Commentator (voice) (uncredited)
- John Horsley as Anaesthetist (uncredited)

== Production ==
The success of Carry On Sergeant led to Nat Cohen and Stuart Levy of Anglo-Amalgamated requesting a follow up. The film was made from 3 November to 12 December 1958 with filming at Pinewood Studios in Buckinghamshire.

Many of the cast from Carry on Sergeant returned including Shirley Eaton.

== Release ==
The film premiered in London at the Carlton Cinema on 5 March 1959 before going on general release nationwide from 23 March 1959.

== Reception ==
=== Box office ===
The film was the most popular at the British box office in 1959 grossing $843,000. It was the most successful Carry On film with an estimated ten million admissions. It made over $2 million in theatrical rentals in the US.

=== Critical ===
A positive review in Variety called it "the second in what should be a golden series. It does for hospital what its predecessor did for military life ... It is an unabashed assault on the patrons' funnybones. The yocks come thick and fast." A negative review in The Monthly Film Bulletin of the UK stated: "A somewhat stale farce, mixing slapstick, caricature and crudely anatomical humour, puts life in a public hospital ward into the same cheerlessly rollicking category as the barrack-room." Bosley Crowther of The New York Times wrote, "All they do is run through their routines – and hackneyed routines they are, tending mostly toward roughhouse antics and intimate hospital gags. The script by Norman Hudis is pure Roquefort, the direction of Gerald Thomas is vaudeville-timed. Yet this film has been a vast success in Britain ... don't ask us why." Richard L. Coe of The Washington Post wrote that "being so frankly Lowbrow, 'Carry On Nurse' also should appeal to Highbrows who, as Russell Lynes' Law states, have much in common with the Lowbrows. Middle Brows should stay away and let the rest of us wallow."

== Bibliography ==
- Davidson, Andy (2012). Carry On Confidential. London: Miwk. ISBN 978-1-908630-01-8.
- Sheridan, Simon (2011). Keeping the British End Up – Four Decades of Saucy Cinema. London: Titan Books. ISBN 978-0-85768-279-6.
- Webber, Richard (2009). 50 Years of Carry On. London: Arrow. ISBN 978-0-09-949007-4.
- Hudis, Norman (2008). No Laughing Matter. London: Apex. ISBN 978-1-906358-15-0.
- Keeping the British End Up: Four Decades of Saucy Cinema by Simon Sheridan (third edition) (2007) (Reynolds & Hearn Books)
- Ross, Robert (2002). The Carry On Companion. London: Batsford. ISBN 978-0-7134-8771-8.
- Bright, Morris; Ross, Robert (2000). Mr Carry On – The Life & Work of Peter Rogers. London: BBC Books. ISBN 978-0-563-55183-6.
- Rigelsford, Adrian (1996). Carry On Laughing – a celebration. London: Virgin. ISBN 1-85227-554-5.
- Hibbin, Sally & Nina (1988). What a Carry On. London: Hamlyn. ISBN 978-0-600-55819-4.
- Eastaugh, Kenneth (1978). The Carry On Book. London: David & Charles. ISBN 978-0-7153-7403-0.
