= 1948 in literature =

This article contains information about the literary events and publications of 1948.

== Events ==
- January 6 – The poet Pablo Neruda speaks out in the Senate of Chile against political repression and is forced into hiding.
- January 28 – A debate between Bertrand Russell and Frederick Copleston on the existence of God is broadcast by the BBC.
- February 5 – A private assembly of 50 major literary and artistic figures listens to a recording of Antonin Artaud's play Pour en Finir avec le Jugement de dieu (To Have Done With the Judgment of God), whose broadcast on French radio three days earlier has been prohibited.
- February 17–November 24 – Venezuelan novelist Rómulo Gallegos serves as his country's first correctly elected President, until overthrown by the 1948 Venezuelan coup d'état.
- March 21 – Halldor Laxness's The Atom Station (Atómstöðin) sells out all copies on its first day of publication.
- May – Bertolt Brecht's The Caucasian Chalk Circle (1944) is first performed as a student production, in English, at Carleton College, Northfield, Minnesota. This year also sees the première of Brecht's adaptation of Antigone, at the Chur Stadttheater in Switzerland, with Helene Weigel in the title rôle.
- May 4 – Sir Laurence Olivier's film of Shakespeare's Hamlet is shown. It will be the first British film to win the Academy Award for Best Picture.
- c. June 1 – The first volume of Winston Churchill's The Second World War (1948–1953) is published.
- September 8 – Terence Rattigan's one-act plays The Browning Version and Harlequinade are first performed at the Phoenix Theatre (London).
- September 17 – The Irish poet W. B. Yeats, who died at Menton, France, in 1939, is reburied at Drumcliffe, County Sligo, "Under bare Ben Bulben's head", having been moved from the original burial place, Roquebrune-Cap-Martin, on the Irish Naval Service corvette LÉ Macha. His grave at Drumcliffe, with an epitaph from "Under Ben Bulben", one of his final poems ("Cast a cold Eye/On Life, on Death./Horseman, pass by"), becomes a place of literary pilgrimage.
- November 13 – Alice's Adventures Under Ground, the original manuscript of Lewis Carroll's Alice's Adventures in Wonderland, bought by a group of American Anglophiles in 1946, is presented by Luther H. Evans (Librarian of Congress) to the British Museum Library.
- unknown dates
  - The 20th and last edition of the Index Librorum Prohibitorum is published by the Holy See.
  - The London publisher Weidenfeld & Nicolson is founded by George Weidenfeld and Nigel Nicolson.
  - The Pulitzer Prize for the Novel is renamed the Pulitzer Prize for Fiction.
  - The Palatino serif typeface, designed by Hermann Zapf, is released by the Mergenthaler Linotype Company.

== New books ==
=== Fiction ===
- Ilse Aichinger – Die größere Hoffnung (The Greater Hope, translated as Herod's Children)
- Martha Albrand – After Midnight
- Jerzy Andrzejewski – Ashes and Diamonds
- Charlotte Armstrong – The Chocolate Cobweb
- Isaac Asimov – The Endochronic Properties of Resublimated Thiotimoline (short story)
- Nigel Balchin – The Borgia Testament
- René Barjavel – Le Diable l'emporte
- Alexander Baron – From the City, From the Plough
- Hervé Bazin – Viper in the Fist (Vipère au Poing)
- Henry Bellamann – Parris Mitchell of King's Row
- Elizabeth Bowen – The Heat of the Day
- Christianna Brand – Death of Jezebel
- Jocelyn Brooke
  - The Military Orchid
  - The Scapegoat
- Pearl S. Buck – Peony
- Gerald Butler – Slippery Hitch
- Taylor Caldwell – Melissa
- Victor Canning – Panther's Moon
- Truman Capote – Other Voices, Other Rooms
- Al Capp – The Life and Times of the Shmoo
- John Dickson Carr (as Carter Dickson) – The Skeleton in the Clock
- John Paddy Carstairs – Solid! Said the Earl
- Adolfo Bioy Casares – The Celestial Plot (La trama celeste) (short stories)
- Willa Cather (died 1947) – The Old Beauty and Others (short stories, including "The Best Years")
- Peter Cheyney – Dark Wanton
- Agatha Christie
  - Taken at the Flood
  - The Rose and the Yew Tree (as by Mary Westmacott)
  - The Witness for the Prosecution and Other Stories
- James Gould Cozzens – Guard of Honor
- Edmund Crispin
  - Buried for Pleasure
  - Love Lies Bleeding
- A. J. Cronin – Shannon's Way
- Osamu Dazai – No Longer Human
- L. Sprague de Camp – Divide and Rule
- L. Sprague de Camp and Fletcher Pratt – The Carnelian Cube
- August Derleth – Not Long for this World
- Lord Dunsany – The Fourth Book of Jorkens
- Howard Fast – My Glorious Brothers
- William Faulkner – Intruder in the Dust
- Gaito Gazdanov – The Specter of Alexander Wolf (serialization completed)
- Jon Godden – The House by the Sea
- F. L. Green – Mist on the Waters
- Henry Green – Concluding
- Graham Greene – The Heart of the Matter
- Giovannino Guareschi – Mondo Piccolo: Don Camillo (The Little World of Don Camillo)
- Hella Haasse (anonymously) – Oeroeg
- L. P. Hartley – The Travelling Grave and Other Stories
- Marguerite Henry – King of the Wind
- Georgette Heyer – The Foundling
- Zora Neale Hurston – Seraph on the Suwanee
- Aldous Huxley – Ape and Essence
- Hammond Innes – Maddon's Rock
- Shirley Jackson
  - The Road Through the Wall
  - "The Lottery" (short story)
  - "Charles" (short story)
- Anna Kavan – The House of Sleep
- Patrick Kavanagh – Tarry Flynn
- Yasunari Kawabata – Snow Country (雪国, Yukiguni, completed version)
- Arthur La Bern – Paper Orchid
- Halldór Laxness – The Atom Station
- Alexander Lernet-Holenia – The Count of Saint Germain
- Audrey Erskine Lindop – Soldiers' Daughters Never Cry
- Ross Lockridge Jr. – Raintree County
- E. C. R. Lorac
  - Death Before Dinner
  - Part for a Poisoner
- Edgar Lustgarten – Blondie Iscariot
- Norman Mailer – The Naked and the Dead
- Thomas Mann – Joseph and His Brothers
- Leopoldo Marechal – Adam Buenosayres
- Ana María Matute – Los Abel
- W. Somerset Maugham – Catalina
- Gladys Mitchell – The Dancing Druids
- C. L. Moore – The Mask of Circe
- Alan Moorehead – The Rage of the Vulture
- Zoe B. Oldenbourg – The World Is Not Enough
- Alan Paton – Cry, the Beloved Country
- Ellery Queen – Ten Days' Wonder
- Seabury Quinn – Roads
- Anya Seton – The Hearth and the Eagle
- Irwin Shaw – The Young Lions
- Nevil Shute – No Highway
- B. F. Skinner – Walden Two
- Clark Ashton Smith – Genius Loci and Other Tales
- Dodie Smith – I Capture the Castle
- William Gardner Smith – Last of the Conquerors
- Howard Spring – There Is No Armour
- Robert Standish – Elephant Walk
- Rex Stout – And Be a Villain
- Cecil Street
  - The Paper Bag
  - The Telephone Call
- Ahmet Hamdi Tanpınar – A Mind at Peace (Huzur, serial publication)
- Josephine Tey – The Franchise Affair
- Gore Vidal – The City and the Pillar
- Mika Waltari – The Adventurer (Mikael Karvajalka)
- Donald Wandrei – The Web of Easter Island
- Evelyn Waugh – The Loved One
- Stanley G. Weinbaum – The Black Flame
- Dorothy West – The Living is Easy
- Thornton Wilder – The Ides of March
- Brock Williams – Uncle Willie and the Bicycle Shop
- Herman Wouk – City Boy: The Adventures of Herbie Bookbinder
- Frank Yerby – The Golden Hawk

=== Children and young people ===
- Bertil Almqvist – Barna Hedenhös: bilder från stenåldern (The Hedenhös Family: Pictures from the Stone Age)
- Rev. W. Awdry – James the Red Engine (third in The Railway Series of 42 books by him and his son Christopher Awdry)
- Hans Fischer – Pitschi. Das Kätzchen, das immer etwas anderes wollte. Eine traurige Geschichte, die aber gut aufhört
- Antonia Forest – Autumn Term (first in the Marlow series of ten books)
- Ruth Stiles Gannett – My Father's Dragon
- Robert A. Heinlein - "Space Cadet"
- Marguerite Henry – King of the Wind (Newbery Medal)
- Lorna Hill – Marjorie and Co. (first in the Marjorie series of six books)
- Tove Jansson – Trollkarlens hatt (The Magician's Hat, translated as Finn Family Moomintroll)
- Astrid Lindgren – Pippi in the South Seas (Pippi Långstrump i Söderhavet)
- Dr. Seuss – Thidwick the Big-Hearted Moose
- Rosemary Tonks – On Wooden Wings: The Adventures of Webster
- Geoffrey Trease – The Hills of Varna (also as Shadow of the Hawk)
- Elfrida Vipont – The Lark in the Moon

=== Drama ===
- Bertolt Brecht – Antigone, The Caucasian Chalk Circle and Mr Puntila and his Man Matti (Herr Puntila und sein Knecht Matti, first performed)
- Robertson Davies – Overlaid
- Witold Gombrowicz – The Marriage (first published, in Spanish translation)
- Kenneth Horne – A Lady Mislaid
- Margaret Kennedy – Happy with Either
- Junji Kinoshita – Yūzuru (Twilight Crane)
- Dudley Leslie and J. Lee Thompson – The Human Touch
- J.B. Priestley –Home Is Tomorrow
- Terence Rattigan – The Browning Version and Harlequinade
- Jean-Paul Sartre – Dirty Hands (Les Mains sales)
- Vernon Sylvaine - One Wild Oat
- John Van Druten – Make Way for Lucia
- Arthur Watkyn – For Better, for Worse
- Kerala women's Malayalam collective – Thozhil Kendrathilekku (To the Workplace!)

=== Poetry ===
- Sukanta Bhattacharya (died 1947) – Chharpatra (ছাড়পত্র, "Certificate")
- Olga Kirsch – Mure van die Hart
- Derek Walcott – 25 Poems

=== Non-fiction ===
- Winston Churchill – The Gathering Storm (The Second World War, vol. 1)
- T. S. Eliot – Notes Towards the Definition of Culture
- Robert Graves – The White Goddess
- Frank Bunker Gilbreth Jr. and Ernestine Gilbreth Carey – Cheaper by the Dozen
- Richard Hofstadter – The American Political Tradition
- F. R. Leavis – The Great Tradition
- Betty MacDonald – The Plague and I
- Dumas Malone – Jefferson and His Time: Jefferson the Virginian
- Thomas Merton – The Seven Storey Mountain
- A. A. Milne – The Norman Church
- Anthony Powell – John Aubrey and His Friends
- Paul Samuelson – Economics
- John Steinbeck (photographs by Robert Capa) – A Russian Journal

== Births ==
- January 1 – Lynn Abbey (Marilyn Lorraine Abbey), American writer
- January 2 – Joyce Wadler, American writer and memoirist
- January 20 – Nigel Williams, English author, playwright and screenwriter
- February 3 – Henning Mankell, Swedish crime novelist, children's author and dramatist (died 2015)
- February 5 – Christopher Guest, English-American writer, actor and director
- February 15 – Art Spiegelman, American cartoonist
- February 19 – Clive Sinclair, English short-story writer
- February 28 – Mike Figgis, English writer, director and composer
- February 29
  - Hermione Lee, English biographer
  - Patricia A. McKillip, American fantasy and science fiction novel author (died 2022)
- March 4 – James Ellroy, American crime fiction author
- March 17 – William Gibson, American-born speculative novelist
- March 28 – Iman Budhi Santosa, Indonesian poet
- April 4 – Dan Simmons, American science fiction and horror writer (died 2026)
- April 21 – Clare Boylan, Irish novelist (died 2006)
- April 28 – Terry Pratchett, English comic fantasy author (died 2015)
- May 31 – Svetlana Alexievich, Belarusian writer of literary reportage, Nobel Prize in Literature recipient
- June 14 – Laurence Yep, American author
- June 16 – F. van Dixhoorn, Dutch poet
- June 21 – Andrzej Sapkowski, Polish fantasy author
- June 30 – Wolf Erlbruch, German children's book illustrator and writer (died 2022)
- July 22 – Susan Eloise Hinton, American young-adult author
- August 2 – Snoo Wilson, English playwright and screenwriter (died 2013)
- August 8 – Miranda Seymour, English novelist and biographer
- August 24 – Alexander McCall Smith, Scottish writer
- August 28 – Vonda N. McIntyre, American science fiction writer (died 2019)
- August 29 – Nick Darke, Cornish playwright (died 2005)
- September 2 – Manfred Böckl, German novelist and writer of popular history (died 2026)
- September 16 – Julia Donaldson, English author and children's writer
- September 20 – George R. R. Martin (George Raymond Martin), American fantasy author
- October 5 – Zoran Živković, Serbian author and academic
- October 6 – Zakes Mda (Zanemvula Kizito Gatyeni Mda), South African novelist, poet and playwright
- October 9 – Ciaran Carson, Northern Irish poet and novelist
- October 17 – Robert Jordan (James Oliver Rigney, Jr), American fantasy author (died 2007)
- October 18 – Ntozake Shange (Paulette L. Williams), African American playwright, poet and novelist (died 2018)
- November 18 – Frances Fyfield, English jurist and crime writer
- December 2 – T. C. Boyle, American novelist
- December 7 – Gertrud Leutenegger, Swiss novelist and poet (died 2025)
- December 20 – Abdulrazak Gurnah, Zanzibar-born novelist, Nobel Prize in Literature recipient
- unknown dates
  - Ibrahim al-Koni, Libyan novelist
  - Suzanne Robert, French Canadian novelist (died 2007)
  - Edward Rutherfurd (Francis Edward Wintle), English novelist

== Deaths ==
- January 2 – Vicente Huidobro, Chilean poet (b. 1893)
- January 21 – Eraclie Sterian, Romanian science writer and playwright (born 1872)
- March 6 – Ross Lockridge Jr., American author (suicide, born 1914)
- March 10 – Zelda Fitzgerald, American novelist (killed in fire, born 1900)
- April 22 – Prosper Montagné, French chef and food author (born 1865)
- May 5 – Sextil Pușcariu, Romanian linguist, philologist and journalist (heart failure, born 1877)
- May 20 – Victor Ido, Dutch East Indian journalist, novelist and dramatist (born 1869)
- May 22 – Claude McKay, Jamaican American writer (born 1889)
- June 13 - Dazai Osamu, Japanese writer (born 1909)
- June 16 – Holbrook Jackson, English journalist, writer, publisher and bibliophile (born 1874)
- June 21 – Alice Brown, American novelist, poet and dramatist (born 1857)
- July 3 – Phelps Putnam, American poet (born 1894)
- July 4 – Monteiro Lobato, Brazilian fiction writer, particularly for children (born 1882)
- July 5 – Georges Bernanos, French novelist (born 1888)
- July 21 – J.-H. Rosny jeune (Séraphin Justin François Boex), French science fiction writer (born 1859)
- July 27 – Susan Glaspell, American dramatist and novelist (born 1876)
- August 3 – Venetia Stanley, English correspondent (cancer, born 1887)
- August 19 – Frederick Philip Grove, German-born Canadian novelist and essayist (born 1879)
- August 25 – Gordon Bottomley, English poet, writer of verse drama (born 1874)
- September 8 – Thomas Mofolo, Sotho novelist (born 1876)
- September 9 – Lajos Bíró, Hungarian novelist, dramatist and screenwriter (born 1880)
- September 20 – Husain Salaahuddin, Maldivian writer (born 1881)
- October 12 – Alfred Kerr, German theatre critic (suicide, born 1867)
- December 13 – Michael Roberts, English poet and critic (born 1902)

== Awards ==
- Carnegie Medal for children's literature: Richard Armstrong, Sea Change
- James Tait Black Memorial Prize for fiction: Graham Greene, The Heart of the Matter
- James Tait Black Memorial Prize for biography: Percy A. Scholes, The Great Dr Burney
- Newbery Medal for children's literature: William Pene du Bois, The Twenty-One Balloons
- Nobel Prize in Literature: Thomas Stearns Eliot
- Premio Nadal: Sebastián Juan Arbó, Sobre las piedras grises
- Pulitzer Prize for Drama: Tennessee Williams, A Streetcar Named Desire
- Pulitzer Prize for Fiction: James A. Michener – Tales of the South Pacific
- Pulitzer Prize for Poetry: W. H. Auden: The Age of Anxiety
