= Elephant walk =

Elephant walk or Elephant Walk might refer to:

- Elephant Walk, a 1954 film starring Elizabeth Taylor (after the 1948 novel)
- Elephant Walk (novel), a 1948 novel by "Robert Standish", Digby George Gerahty
- Elephant Walk (restaurant), a French and Cambodian restaurant
- Elephant Walk (Texas A&M), a Texas A&M University tradition
- Elephant walk, a hazing tradition described in detail in the book Not Gay
- "Elephant Walk", a 2002 song by Har Mar Superstar
- Elephant walk (aviation), aircraft taxiing in close formation before takeoff
- "Baby Elephant Walk", a 1961 song by Henry Mancini
