= Comte de Saint Germain (disambiguation) =

The Count of St. Germain (1691 or 1712–1784) was a European adventurer, with an interest in science, alchemy and the arts.

Comte de Saint Germain or Count of St. Germain may also refer to:

== People ==
- Claude Louis, Comte de Saint-Germain (1707–1778), French general
- Antoine-Louis Decrest de Saint-Germain (1761–1835), French soldier of the French Revolutionary Wars
- Edgar de Valcourt-Vermont, who as "Comte C. de Saint-Germain" wrote on Palmistry and founded the American Chirological Society in 1897

== Folklore ==
- Jacques St. Germain, a vampire of New Orleans urban legend

== Arts and entertainment ==
- The Count of Saint Germain, a 1948 novel by Alexander Lernet-Holenia
- Count Saint-Germain, a fictional vampire character from a novel series by Chelsea Quinn Yarbro
- Count Saint-Germain, a fictional character in the Ruby Red Trilogy novel series by German writer Kerstin Gier

== See also ==
- Saint-Germain (disambiguation)
