= Daviau =

Daviau is a surname. Notable people with the surname include:

- Allen Daviau (1942–2020), American cinematographer
- Diane-Monique Daviau (born 1951), Canadian educator, writer, translator, and journalist
- Rob Daviau, American game designer
- Thérèse Daviau (1946–2002), Canadian politician and attorney
