= Godfrey Sampson =

English composer (1902–1949)

Godfrey Sampson (1 June 1902 – 21 June 1949) was an English composer and organist, best remembered for his church and choral music.

Sampson was born in Gloucester, the son of a clergyman, and attended Westminster School. From 1920 he studied composition at the Royal Academy of Music under Benjamin Dale, where he was Goring Thomas scholar in 1924, and where he also won a Mendelssohn Scholarship in 1927. In 1932 he became a professor of composition there.

While still a student Sampson composed a Cello Sonata that was performed by Douglas Cameron and Harry Isaacs at Grotrian Hall, Wigmore Street in 1926. This was followed by the Symphony in D, which was premiered at the Royal Academy in 1927 and repeated at the Henry Wood Proms in 1928, conducted by the composer. Isaacs was also the soloist in Sampson's Symphonic Variations for piano and orchestra, broadcast on 8 June 1932 by the BBC Orchestra, conducted by Victor Hely-Hutchinson.

However, most of his output in the 1930s consisted of short choral works, regularly published by Novello. A recital of his vocal and choral music was broadcast by BBC Radio on 23 June 1935, conducted by Leslie Woodgate. Sampson returned to larger form composition towards the end of his life with the Suite for Strings (1946), and a 15-minute setting of Edgar Allen Poe's The Bells for eight part choir and orchestra (1946).

In the 1920s, Sampson was an organist at his father's church, St Paul's, New Beckenham, Kent. He later played the organ and conducted the choir at Claygate Parish Church while teaching at nearby Milbourne Lodge School. He served in the RAF between 1942 and 1945. He was the teacher and close friend of composer Bruce Montgomery who, under the pen-name Edmund Crispin, based the character of Geoffrey Vintner on him in his detective novel Holy Disorders (1945). The novel Swan Song (1946) is dedicated to him. He died in Claygate, aged 47, from malignant hypertension.

== Works ==
Choral

- Ah My Dear Angrie Lord, chorus and piano
- Awake My Soul (text: Bishop Ken), SATB chorus and organ (1939)
- Benedicite Omnia Opera, SATB chorus
- Come My Way, My Truth, My Life (text: George Herbert) SATB chorus and organ
- The God of Love My Shepherd Is, SATB choir (1932)
- Lover's Lament, part song (1938)
- Madrigal for 2 sopranos, alto and piano, words Christopher Marlowe (1930)
- My Boy Tammy (text: Hector Macneill), mixed voices (1938)
- My Song Shall Be Always, SATB chorus (1937)
- Our Times Are in Thy Hands, chorus and organ (1940)
- O Ye Who Bear Christ's Holy Name, chorus and organ (1940)
- There is a Blessed Home, SATB chorus and organ
- To Meadows (text: Robert Herrick), three part song for female voices (1931)
- Weep you no more, sad fountains, for female voices
- We Prey Thee, Heavenly Father (text: V S S Coles), anthem for SATB choir and organ (1930)

Unison and solo song

- The Constant Lover (text: John Suckling), solo song
- Daybreak (text: Longfellow), unison song
- In Youth is Pleasure (text: Robert Wever), solo song
- Peace be With You, Shepherd's All, carol (1931)
- She walks in beauty, (text: Byron), solo song
- There Rolls the Deep (text: Tennyson), unison song
- Willie drowned in Yarrow, solo song

Instrumental

- Badajoz, for violin and piano (1936)
- Cello Sonata (1926)
- Dance Tune, for piano
- Pastoral Tune for violin and piano (1936) (also transcribed for organ)

Orchestral

- The Bells (text: Edgar Allan Poe), for double SATB chorus and orchestra (1946)
- Suite for Strings (1946)
- Symphonic Variations, for piano and orchestra (1932)
- Symphony in D (1928)
- Three Fragments, for orchestra (1949)

Dramatic

- The Witch's Charm, operetta (1922)
