= The Case of the Gilded Fly =

1944 mystery novel by Edmund Crispin

- First edition 1944
- Author: Edmund Crispin
- Language: English
- Series: Gervase Fen
- Genre: Detective fiction, Theatre-fiction
- Publisher: Victor Gollancz
- Publication date: 1944
- Publication place: England
- Media type: Print
- Pages: 158
- ISBN: 978-0008228002
- Preceded by: -
- Followed by: Holy Disorders

The Case of the Gilded Fly is a locked-room mystery by the English author Edmund Crispin (Bruce Montgomery), written while Crispin was an undergraduate at Oxford and first published in the UK in 1944. It was published in the US a year later under the title Obsequies at Oxford.

Crispin's debut novel, the book contains the first appearance of eccentric amateur detective Gervase Fen, Professor of English Language and Literature at the University of Oxford, who went on to appear in all nine of Crispin's novels as well as most of the short stories. The book abounds in literary allusions ranging from classical antiquity to the mid-20th century.

== Title ==
The novel's title references Shakespeare's King Lear: "the small gilded fly does lecher in my sight".

== Plot ==
The novel is set in Oxford in October 1940. Up-and-coming playwright Robert Warner has chosen a local repertory theatre for the première of his new play and has arrived with his leading lady (and mistress) Rachel West. Also in the cast are Yseut Haskell, in her mid-twenties, and her quiet half-sister Helen. Yseut's promiscuous lifestyle has gained her many enemies, and she has difficulty acknowledging the fact that, about a year earlier, it had been Warner rather than she who had ended their brief affair.

Also arriving at Oxford are Nigel Blake, a former student of Fen's now working as a journalist; Nicholas Barclay, a university drop-out of independent means in search of the good life; Donald Fellowes, organist and choirmaster at St Christopher's College who is hopelessly infatuated with Yseut; and Jean Whitelegge, secretary of the theatre club who is attracted to Fellowes. All are present at a party during the course of which a drunken Yseut threatens Warner with the host's revolver.

The following evening Yseut secretly searches Donald Fellowes' rooms in college. Fellowes and Barclay are in a room opposite listening to an opera on the radio, while Fen and his colleagues are in his rooms one floor above talking with Robert Warner. When they hear a shot they rush downstairs and discover Yseut's body. She has been killed with the very weapon she had been brandishing the night before. On her finger is an unusual Egyptian-style gilded ring bearing a winged insect (the "gilded fly" of the title).

As it appears impossible for anyone to have entered Fellowes' rooms unobserved, the police suspect suicide. Fen, on the other hand, declares that Yseut was murdered but declines to explain his reasons. Just a few hours before the play is due to open, Fellowes is murdered in the organ loft of his college chapel during evensong.

The show proves to be a triumph for Robert Warner. After it is over, and with all suspects assembled, Fen prepares to announce the identity of the double murderer. Before he can do so, Warner pulls out a gun, threatens to shoot anyone who follows him and attempts to escape across the stage. He is crushed and killed as the safety curtain falls on him.

== Manuscript ==
Crispin wrote the novel in an intensive ten-day burst of activity in 1943 while an undergraduate at the University of Oxford. According to his friend Philip Larkin, Crispin spent ten days of his Easter vacation writing "with his J nib and silver pen-holder".

== Publication ==
US first edition 1945

The novel was first published by Victor Gollancz in the UK in 1944 and was released a year later by Lippincott in the United States under the title Obsequies at Oxford. It has since been reissued several times, including a reissue by Gollancz in 1969 and a new US printing under the original UK title by Walker & Co in 1979.

== Critical reception ==
Reviewing the 1969 reissue for The Times, HRF Keating described the novel as less good than Crispin's The Moving Toyshop, "being rather too much bogged down with the mechanics of suspicion-casting to achieve total elan".

Crispin's Times obituary of 1978 detected within The Case of the Gilded Fly the influence of his favourite authors John Dickson Carr, Gladys Mitchell and Michael Innes together with – in his own words – "a dash of Evelyn Waugh". The obituarist placed the novel within the "highly improbable but wholly delightful" academic detective genre in which stories were never meant to be realistic but were "simply an entertainment for educated readers, in which a backbone consisting of ingenious, perfectly serious, detective puzzles was most engagingly adorned with academic wit and precise good writing".

== Bibliography ==
- DeMarr, Mary Jean (1984). "Edmund Crispin". In Bargainnier, Earl F. (ed.). Twelve Englishmen of Mystery. Bowling Green, Ohio: Bowling Green University popular Press. ISBN 0-87972-250-9.
