= Gone with the West =

1975 film by Bernard Girard

Little Moon and Jud McGraw
- Original movie poster
- Directed by: Bernard Girard
- Written by: Monroe Manning; Douglas Day Stewart; Marcus Demian
- Produced by: William Collins (producer)
- Starring: See below
- Cinematography: Gerald Perry Finnerman
- Edited by: Andrew Herbert; Pat Somerset
- Music by: Bob Ross
- Release date: 2 July 1975
- Running time: 92 minutes 95 minutes (Netherlands)
- Country: United States
- Language: English

Gone with the West is a 1975 American Western film starring James Caan and Stefanie Powers, directed by Bernard Girard.

The film is also known as Little Moon & Jud McGraw in Australia and Little Moon and Jud McGraw (American reissue title). It was filmed in 1969 under the title Man Without Mercy but did not find a cinema release.

== Plot ==
The movie begins with a screenwriter driving out into the desert and meeting up with an old timer who spins him a tale of the Old West: Jud McGraw is a stagecoach driver who gets robbed by a gang led by Nimmo. He then gets blamed for stealing the gold. Nimmo also burns his farm and kills his wife and son. When McGraw is released from prison, he finds the town Nimmo rules. Nimmo pretty much owns the whole town, including the sheriff, whose sister Billie is also Nimmo's woman. A quick-draw gunslinger, Kid Dandy, plays billiards and helps keep Nimmo safe from harm. McGraw watches their drunken parties from the hills, including a gang rape of Little Moon, a native American woman who only speaks Spanish. He later comes across Little Moon bathing in a spring. They begin traveling together while McGraw devises plans to attack the town and destroy Nimmo. Little Moon does much of the labor and tries to attract McGraw, but he is too preoccupied.They kill many of Nimmo's men and then go to town for the final plan. McGraw almost gets killed trying to steal dynamite from Nimmo's shack, but Little Moon saves him.

== Cast ==
- James Caan as Jud McGraw
- Stefanie Powers as Little Moon
- Aldo Ray as Nimmo, Stage Robber
- Barbara Werle as Billie
- Robert Walker Jr. as Sheriff of Black Miller
- Sammy Davis Jr. as Kid Dandy
- Heather Angel as Old Little Moon / Narrator
- Mike Lane as Shark
- Elmore Vincent as Jerry
- L. Andy Stone as Old Jud
- Elizebeth Leigh as Gail
- Kenneth Adams as Artie
- Michael Conrad as Smithy
- Anne Barton as Smithy's Wife
- Paul Bergen as Singing Cowboy
- Fred Book as Piano Player
- Anthony Gordon as Prisoner
- Fabian Dean as Charlie
- Gillian Simpson as Jeb's Wife
- Chris Calabrese as Jeb's Son
- Noel Drayton as Wagon Driver
- James McHale as Farmhand
- Pepper Martin as Mimmo's Man

== Soundtrack ==
- "A Man" (Words and Music by Roger Davenport and Bob Ross)

== See also ==
- List of American films of 1975
