= The Glimpses of the Moon (Crispin novel) =

1977 mystery novel by Edmund Crispin

- First Edition
- Author: Edmund Crispin
- Language: English
- Series: Gervase Fen
- Genre: Detective
- Publisher: Gollancz
- Publication date: 1977
- Publication place: United Kingdom
- Media type: Print
- Preceded by: Beware of the Trains
- Followed by: Fen Country

The Glimpses of the Moon is a 1977 detective novel by the British writer Edmund Crispin. It was the ninth and last novel in his series featuring Gervase Fen, an Oxford professor and amateur detective. Written from the 1960s onwards on publication it was the first novel in the series to be released since The Long Divorce in 1951. The author died the following year and in 1979 a final work Fen Country, a collection of short stories featuring the detective, was published posthumously.

The title is taken from a line from Shakespeare's Hamlet. It is set in the village of Aller in rural Devon.

== Bibliography ==
- Bargainnier, Earl F. Comic Crime. Popular Press, 1987.
- Reilly, John M. Twentieth Century Crime & Mystery Writers. Springer, 2015.
- Whittle, David. Bruce Montgomery/Edmund Crispin: A Life in Music and Books. Routledge, 2017.
