= Beware of the Trains =

1953 story collection by Edmund Crispin

- Author: Edmund Crispin
- Language: English
- Series: Gervase Fen
- Genre: Detective
- Publisher: Gollancz
- Publication date: 1953
- Publication place: United Kingdom
- Media type: Print
- Preceded by: The Long Divorce
- Followed by: The Glimpses of the Moon

Beware of the Trains is a collection of detective short stories by the British writer Edmund Crispin published in 1953. It contains sixteen stories including Beware of the Trains which gave its title to the collection. They all feature Crispin's amateur detective and Oxford professor Gervase Fen, an eccentric with a genius for solving complex cases. A number also featured Detective Inspector Humbleby of Scotland Yard who also appears in two of the novels in the Fen series. Apart from one they had all previously appeared in the Evening Standard newspaper. It was the last work featuring Fen for many years, until Crispin returned to the character for the 1977 novel The Glimpses of the Moon.

== Stories ==
- Beware of the Trains
- Humbleby Agonistes
- The Drowning of Edgar Foley
- Lacrimae Rerum
- Within the Gates
- Abhorred Shears
- The Little Room
- Express Delivery
- A Pot of Paint
- The Quick Brown Fox
- Black for a Funeral
- The Name on the Window
- The Golden Mean
- Otherwhere
- The Evidence for the Crown
- Deadlock

== Bibliography ==
- Reilly, John M. Twentieth Century Crime & Mystery Writers. Springer, 2015.
- Whittle, David. Bruce Montgomery/Edmund Crispin: A Life in Music and Books. Routledge, 2017.
