= Cecil Gerahty =

English journalist

Cecil Echlin Gerahty (1888 – 13 May 1938) was an English journalist for the Daily Mail.

== Biography ==
Born in Hampton Wick in 1888, his parents were George Marsh and his wife Laura. His younger brothers were the author Digby George Gerahty and the actor Leslie Marsh Gerahty.

From 31 August 1915, Gerahty served in the Royal Navy Volunteer Reserve, with the rank of lieutenant and in 1919 he was mentioned in despatches for his services in action against enemy submarines off Gibraltar.

After the war, between 1924 and 1936, he sailed from the UK to Tangier, Morocco, on eleven occasions, and also to Gibraltar in 1937. His occupation was recorded as Shipping Agent and then later in 1931 as journalist. In 1925 he was accompanied by Irene Winifred Gerahty (aged 35) and Esmond Echlin Gerahty (aged 1). His address was given as 27 Cresswell Road, Twickenham and later 12 St James Square, London. Esmond was attending Marlborough House School, Reading, in 1933.

In 1937 he gave a talk on the BBC on "My Friends the Moors".

He was author of The Road to Madrid about the rise of General Franco and the Spanish Civil War. The Daily Mail was staunchly pro-Franco and Gerahty was a key apologist for the Nationalists in their attempt to refute the bombing of Guernica. He travelled extensively around Nationalist Spain and made a shortwave propaganda broadcast on behalf of the Nationalists. He also published documents, later shown to be forgeries, alleging that radical insurrections were being planned at the time that the army revolted.

He died on 13 May 1938 at University College Hospital. His wife Irene died 1971 in Eastbourne.

== Publications ==
- Gerahty, Cecil. (1937). The Road to Madrid, London: Hutchinson
- William Foss, Cecil Gerahty. (1938). The Spanish Arena, London: Right Book Club
