= The Long Divorce =

1951 mystery novel by Edmund Crispin

- American first edition
- Author: Edmund Crispin
- Language: English
- Series: Gervase Fen
- Genre: Detective
- Publisher: Gollancz; Dodd, Mead (US)
- Publication date: 1951
- Publication place: United Kingdom
- Media type: Print
- Preceded by: Frequent Hearses
- Followed by: Beware of the Trains

The Long Divorce is a 1951 detective novel by the British writer Edmund Crispin, the eighth in his series featuring the Oxford professor and amateur detective Gervase Fen. It was the penultimate novel in the series, with a gap or more than twenty five years before the next entry The Glimpses of the Moon, although a collection of short stories Beware of the Trains was published in 1953. The novel features many traits of a Golden Age mystery, set in a small, wealthy English village. The title doesn't refer to a marriage but is a quote from Shakespeare's Henry VIII "the long divorce of steel". It was published in the United States by Dodd, Mead in 1951 under the same title, and a year later as A Noose for Her.

== Synopsis ==
A series of poison pen letters have disrupted the calm of the picturesque English village of Cotton Abbas. Amongst those receiving the messages are an attractive, young female doctor and a bluff Yorkshire businessman whose teenage daughter has become infatuated with a Swiss schoolmaster. Things take a more serious turn when a woman commits suicide after receiving a letter threatening to expose a deeply-held secret, and the case continues to baffle the local police force, including the chief constable of the county who lives in the village. To add to the mystery, a man arrives to stay at the inn calling himself Mr. Datchery (an alias he has clearly taken from Dickens' Edwin Drood) and an unlikely story that he is there conducting research for Mass Observation.

== Bibliography ==
- Bargainnier, Earl F. Comic Crime. Popular Press, 1987.
- Hubin, Allen J. Crime Fiction, 1749–1980: A Comprehensive Bibliography. Garland Publishing, 1984.
- Reilly, John M. Twentieth Century Crime & Mystery Writers. Springer, 2015.
- Whittle, David. Bruce Montgomery/Edmund Crispin: A Life in Music and Books. Routledge, 2017.
