= Frequent Hearses =

1950 mystery novel by Edmund Crispin

- 1958 Penguin edition
- Author: Edmund Crispin
- Language: English
- Series: Gervase Fen
- Genre: Detective
- Publisher: Gollancz; Dodd, Mead (US)
- Publication date: 1950
- Publication place: United Kingdom
- Media type: Print
- Preceded by: Buried for Pleasure
- Followed by: The Long Divorce

Frequent Hearses is a 1950 detective novel by the British author Edmund Crispin. It is the seventh in his series of novels featuring Gervase Fen an Oxford University professor and amateur detective. Published during the Golden Age of Detective Fiction, it is set in the British film industry where Fen has been employed as a historical advisor on The Unfortunate Lady, a biopic of the English poet Alexander Pope. The title is taken from a line of Pope's Elegy to the Memory of an Unfortunate Lady, "on all the line a sudden vengeance waits, and frequent hearses shall besiege your gates". It was published in the United States by Dodd, Mead the same year under the alternative title Sudden Vengeance.

== Synopsis ==
Young, ambitious actress Gloria Scott commits suicide by throwing herself off Waterloo Bridge into the Thames, which appears baffling given that she has just been cast in a breakthrough part in the latest historical film being produced. Fen's friend Inspector Humbleby of Scotland Yard travels to the film studios on the rural outskirts of the capital. While he and Fen are there, at a script conference, the cinematographer Maurice Crane collapses having been poisoned. Maurice was the brother of celebrated actress Madge Crane, the studio's leading star, and Nicholas, the film's director. Popular gossip suggests he had been having an affair with Gloria.

Fen immediately believes the killing is an act of vengeance on behalf of the dead Gloria. He becomes convinced that the remaining Cranes are also under threat, particularly when it becomes clear that Madge had persuaded Nicholas to have Gloria removed from the production due to her jealousy of her, something that apparently drove her impulsively to suicide in her disappointment. Matters come to a denouement at the country house of the Cranes near Aylesbury when Nicholas is stabbed to death. The murderer manages to escape through the maze, but Fen is able to work out their identity.

== Bibliography ==
- Bargainnier, Earl F. Twelve Englishmen of Mystery. Popular Press, 1984.
- Bourgeau, Art. The Mystery Lover's Companion. Crown, 1986.
- Hubin, Allen J. Crime Fiction, 1749–1980: A Comprehensive Bibliography. Garland Publishing, 1984.
- Reilly, John M. Twentieth Century Crime & Mystery Writers. Springer, 2015.
- Whittle, David. Bruce Montgomery/Edmund Crispin: A Life in Music and Books. Routledge, 2017.
