= Love Lies Bleeding (novel) =

1948 mystery novel by Edmund Crispin

- American first edition
- Author: Edmund Crispin
- Language: English
- Series: Gervase Fen
- Genre: Detective
- Publisher: Gollancz; Lippincott (US)
- Publication date: 1948
- Publication place: United Kingdom
- Media type: Print
- Preceded by: Swan Song
- Followed by: Buried for Pleasure

Love Lies Bleeding is a detective novel by Edmund Crispin, first published in 1948. Set in the post-war period in and around a public school in the vicinity of Stratford-upon-Avon, it is about the accidental discovery of old manuscripts which contain Shakespeare's long-lost play, Love's Labour's Won, and the subsequent hunt for those manuscripts, in the course of which several people are murdered. Collaborating with the local police, Oxford don Gervase Fen, a professor of English who happens to be the guest of honour at the school's Speech Day, can solve the case at the same weekend.

== Bibliography ==
- Reilly, John M. Twentieth Century Crime & Mystery Writers. Springer, 2015.
- Whittle, David. Bruce Montgomery/Edmund Crispin: A Life in Music and Books. Routledge, 2017.
