= Milbourne Lodge School =

Coordinates: 51°21′55.31″N 0°21′59.54″W

Location
- Arbrook Lane; Esher, Surrey, KT10 9EG; England

Information
- Type: Pre-prep & prep school
- Established: 1912
- Headteacher: Judy Waite
- Gender: Coeducational
- Age: 4 to 13
- Website: www.milbournelodge.co.uk

Milbourne Lodge School is a co-educational pre-prep and preparatory school for children aged four to thirteen.

Located in Esher, Surrey, the school is housed in a Victorian mansion situated on 8.5 acres (3.4 ha) of Surrey countryside.

== History ==
Milbourne Lodge was founded in 1912 by Harvey Wyatt, father of the politician Woodrow Wyatt, who established the school in Arbrook Lane, Surrey. The school is situated on its original site, with the preparatory year groups occupying the original school building and the pre-preparatory year groups taught in what was previously the Headmaster's house.

In 1948 the school was bought by Norman Hale who was Headmaster for fifty-one years.

In 2007 Milbourne Lodge became part of the Cognita group.

In 2012, the school was found to have "improperly expelled a brother and sister after their parents criticised the parents' association's handling of finances". Judge Robert Reid added that "'I am surprised that an apparently 100-year-old school has got such a shambles by way of a parents' association'".

In 2025 Cognita sold Milbourne Lodge School to Blenheim Schools and Outcomes First Group along with 11 other schools.

The headteacher is Judy Waite. The school met all required standards in a 2025 inspection by the Independent Schools Inspectorate, receiving positive feedback for leadership and pastoral care.

== Notable staff ==
- Godfrey Sampson, composer and organist
