= Noel Drayton =

American actor

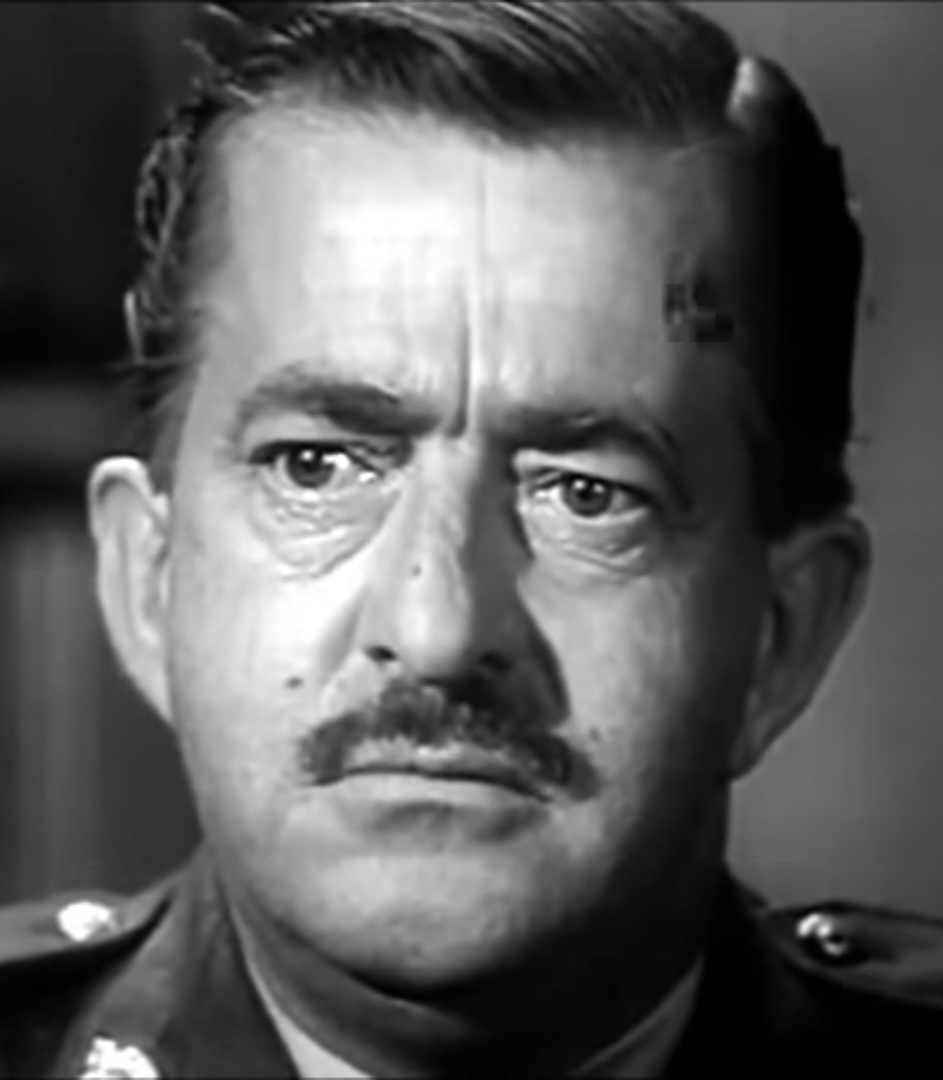
- Noel Drayton in an episode of One Step Beyond (1960)
- Born: October 7, 1913; Cape Town, South Africa
- Died: December 7, 1981 (aged 68); Sedona, Arizona, U.S.
- Occupation: Actor
- Years active: 1950-1969; 1975

Noel Drayton (October 7, 1913 – December 7, 1981) was an actor who remains perhaps best known for playing supporting roles in Hollywood films like Elephant Walk, The Court Jester, Plymouth Adventure and Botany Bay during the 1950s. He also appeared as a guest actor on television shows like You Are There, Perry Mason and Alfred Hitchcock Presents. He is also known for the role of Mr. Hardcastle in nine episodes of the popular television show Family Affair.

There is little information provided about Drayton's life. Born in South Africa, he made his film debut with a notable supporting role in Jean Negulesco's Hollywood movie Under My Skin (1950). He remained very active as an actor during the 1950s, but his roles got smaller during the 1960s. He retired in 1969 and returned only for one movie into acting business: Gone with the West (1975), which was his final movie. He died on December 7, 1981, in Sedona, Arizona, aged 68. His body was cremated.

== Partial filmography ==
- Under my Skin (1950) - George Gardner
- Plymouth Adventure (1952) - Miles Standish
- Blackbeard the Pirate (1952) - Jeremy
- Botany Bay (1952) - Second Mate Spencer
- The Desert Rats (1953) - Captain (uncredited)
- You Are There (1953-1956, TV, 6 episodes) - Judge Heywood / Governor Hutchinson / Captain Smith / Secretary of Senate
- Knock on Wood (1954) - Little Man (uncredited)
- Elephant Walk (1954) - Planter Atkinson
- The Seven Little Foys (1955) - Priest (uncredited)
- The Virgin Queen (1955) - Tailor (uncredited)
- The Court Jester (1955) - Fergus
- The 20th Century-Fox Hour (1955-1956; TV, 3 episodes) - Wilkins / Hedges / Alfred Bridges
- TV Reader's Digest (1956; TV, 2 episodes) - Detective Inspector Herbert Gold / Captain Connor / Earl of Warwick
- 20 Million Miles to Earth (1957) - 1st Reuters News Correspondent (uncredited)
- Across the Bridge (1957) - Reporter
- Zero Hour! (1957) - Vancouver Control Man
- Hong Kong Confidential (1958) - Owen Howard
- Perry Mason (1958-1965; TV, 3 episodes) - Mr. Costelni / Art Expert / Ellis / Frank Buchanan - Ship Purser
- The Wreck of the Mary Deare (1959) - Charlie Bell (uncredited)
- Alfred Hitchcock Presents (1960; TV) (Season 5 Episode 35: "The Schartz-Metterklume Method") - Ben Huggins
- Sea Hunt (1960-1961; TV, 3 episodes) - Dr. Graham / Dr. Wells (Season 4, Episode 11)/ Thomas Sherington / Lloyd Shepard
- The Prize (1963) - Constable Ströhm (uncredited)
- The Alfred Hitchcock Hour (1964; TV) (Season 2 Episode 19: "Murder Case") - Bar Steward
- The Man from U.N.C.L.E. (1964; TV, 1 episode) - Dr. Parker
- Strange Bedfellows (1965) - Cab Driver (uncredited)
- Assault on a Queen (1966) - Elevator Operator (uncredited)
- The Wrecking Crew (1968) - Lord Hardwicke (uncredited)
- Family Affair (1966-1970; TV series, 9 episodes) - Mr. Hardcastle
- Topaz (1969) - Servant at Embassy (uncredited)
- Gone with the West (1975) - Wagon Driver (final film role)
