= Gervase Fen =

Fictional detective created by Edmund Crispin

- First appearance: The Case of the Gilded Fly
- Last appearance: Fen Country
- Created by: Edmund Crispin

In-universe information
- Gender: Male
- Occupation: Oxford Professor, amateur sleuth
- Nationality: English

Gervase Fen is a fictional amateur detective and Oxford Professor of English Language and Literature created by Edmund Crispin. Fen appears in nine novels and two books of short stories published between 1944 and 1979. Fen is an unconventional detective who is often faced with a locked room mystery to solve.

== Character ==
Fen is described as lanky, cheerful and ruddy with a clean shaven face and hair which is always plastered down with water, but with stray hairs spiking from his crown. He is middle-aged, married, has children, and is often noted as wearing an extraordinary hat. Fen is alternately "charming, frivolous, brilliant and badly behaved" and in the stories acts on his own as an amateur detective as well as frequently assisting the police with their investigations. Fen often exhibits his surprise or shock by quoting Alice in Wonderland – "Oh my fur and whiskers!".

Fen makes his first appearance in The Case of the Gilded Fly and is introduced as wishing to be involved in a "splendidly complicated crime". He is described by one of the other characters in the novel as "Cherubic, naive, volatile, and entirely delightful, he wandered the earth taking a genuine interest in things and people unfamiliar." Much of The Case of the Gilded Fly is set in Fen's Oxford college, the fictional St Christopher's, and this college also provides the setting for parts of The Moving Toyshop and Swan Song. The imaginary college of St Christopher's is located at the junction of St Giles and the Banbury Road in Oxford, currently the site of the Department of Statistics.

In the course of the novels, Fen generally succeeds in identifying the criminal (usually a murderer). When involved in a case he is described as boisterous and gay when nothing important is happening, but melancholy when he finds out key information. Upon completing a case, Fen is described as entering moods of profound gloom similar to the post-case "reactions" experienced by Arthur Conan Doyle's Sherlock Holmes.

Fen often involves himself and those around him in ridiculous situations as he attempts to solve the mysteries he is involved in. His life is regularly threatened in the books, generally by murderers, but also by homicidal dogs, witches and his own lunatic driving in his beloved car "Lily Christine III".

Fen is noted for breaking the fourth wall in the novels. In The Moving Toyshop he makes jokes about the publisher of Crispin's book as well as suggesting different titles for the novel he is acting within.

== Influences ==
In his foreword to Fen Country, Philip Larkin suggests that Fen was based partly on Crispin's Oxford tutor – W.G. Moore. Larkin felt that Fen reproduced much of Moore's appearance and mannerisms. Crispin also himself admitted that Fen was in part based on Moore.

The stories that Fen takes part in are influenced by the detective stories of John Dickson Carr (one of Crispin's favourite authors). The name Gervase Fen may have been inspired partly by Gideon Fell – one of Carr's detectives.

== Bibliography ==
- The Case of the Gilded Fly (1944)
- Holy Disorders (1945)
- The Moving Toyshop (1946)
- Swan Song (1947)
- Love Lies Bleeding (1948)
- Buried for Pleasure (1948)
- Frequent Hearses (1950) (also published as Sudden Vengeance)
- The Long Divorce (1951)
- Beware of the Trains (1953) (short story collection)
- The Glimpses of the Moon (1977)
- Fen Country (1979) (short story collection)

== Adaptations ==
The Moving Toyshop was adapted for the 1960s BBC TV anthology series Detective, Fen was played by Richard Wordsworth. The programme is missing from the BBC archive.

Swan Song was adapted for theater by John Greenwood and Jonathan Levi, and performed in Manhattan in 1986. Tony Tanner both directed and played Fen.

A BBC radio adaptation of Frequent Hearses read by James Wilby was broadcast in May/June 2011.
