= Swan Song (Crispin novel) =

1947 mystery novel by Edmund Crispin

- First edition
- Author: Edmund Crispin
- Language: English
- Series: Gervase Fen
- Genre: Detective
- Publisher: Gollancz
- Publication date: 1947
- Publication place: United Kingdom
- Media type: Print
- Preceded by: The Moving Toyshop
- Followed by: Love Lies Bleeding

Swan Song is a 1947 detective novel by the British writer Edmund Crispin, the fourth in his series featuring the Oxford Don and amateur detective Gervase Fen. It was the first in a new three-book contract the author has signed with his publishers. It received a mixed review from critics.

== Stage adaptation ==
In 1986 the novel was adapted into a play which was staged in New York City by Tony Tanner. It shifted the location from Oxford to Cambridge and changed the opera being performed to Rossini's The Barber of Seville.

== Synopsis ==
Fen becomes dragged into the complex rivalries of an opera company who are to perform the Wagner's The Mastersingers of Nuremberg for the first time in Britain since the Second World War. When one of the singers, widely loathed by the rest of the company, is found hanging dead in his dressing room Fen becomes the driving force behind the investigation. A second murder threatens to derail the opening night, but Fen has at last cracked the case.

== See also ==
- Golden Age of Detective Fiction

== Bibliography ==
- Hubin, Allen J. Crime Fiction, 1749-1980: A Comprehensive Bibliography. Garland Publishing, 1984.
- Lachman, Marvin. The Villainous Stage: Crime Plays on Broadway and in the West End. McFarland, 2014.
- Reilly, John M. Twentieth Century Crime & Mystery Writers. Springer, 2015.
- Whittle, David. Bruce Montgomery/Edmund Crispin: A Life in Music and Books. Routledge, 2017.
