= Under My Skin (1950 film) =

1950 film by Jean Negulesco

- Directed by: Jean Negulesco
- Written by: Casey Robinson
- Based on: "My Old Man" short story by Ernest Hemingway
- Produced by: Casey Robinson
- Starring: John Garfield; Micheline Presle; Luther Adler; Orley Lundgren; Noel Drayton
- Cinematography: Joseph LaShelle
- Edited by: Dorothy Spencer
- Music by: Daniele Amfitheatrof
- Production company: 20th Century Fox
- Distributed by: 20th Century Fox
- Release date: March 17, 1950 (New York City)
- Running time: 86 minutes
- Country: United States
- Language: English

Under My Skin is a 1950 American sports drama film directed by Jean Negulesco and starring John Garfield and Micheline Presle. It is based on the 1923 short story "My Old Man" by Ernest Hemingway about a jockey who is threatened by a mobster after winning a race that he had agreed to throw.

The Hemingway story was later adapted for the 1979 CBS television film My Old Man, starring Kristy McNichol, Warren Oates and Eileen Brennan.

== Plot ==
Accused of throwing races back home, American jockey Danny Arnold now rides horses in Italy, where a gangster named Bork insists that he deliberately lose a race. Dan double-crosses him, then avoids Bork's thugs, taking young son Joe with him to Paris.

Intending to find an old friend, Dan learns from cafe owner Paule Manet that the friend was murdered by criminals because of his unpaid debts. British jockey George Gardner finds Dan a job at the racetrack, while Joe persuades his dad that their new horse Gilford would make a fine steeplechase racer. Dan disappoints his son by winning money on a fixed race that involved George.

Bork and his henchmen appear, threatening to kill Dan if he refuses to lose the next steeplechase race. The criminals enter their own jockey in the race to ensure the outcome, but Dan defies them with George's help. He wins the race, but when another horse collides with Gilford at the finish line, Dan is thrown from Gilford and killed.

== Cast ==
- John Garfield as Dan Arnold
- Micheline Presle as Paule Manet
- Luther Adler as Bork
- Noel Drayton as George Gardner
- Orley Lindgren as Joe Arnold

== See also ==
- List of films about horses
- List of films about horse racing
