= Up the Garden Path =

Up the Garden Path may refer to:

- Up the Garden Path (radio and TV series), a radio and TV series, adapted from a 1984 novel by Sue Limb
- Up the Garden Path (novel), a 1949 detective novel by John Rhode
