= The Court Jester =

1956 film by Norman Panama, Melvin Frank

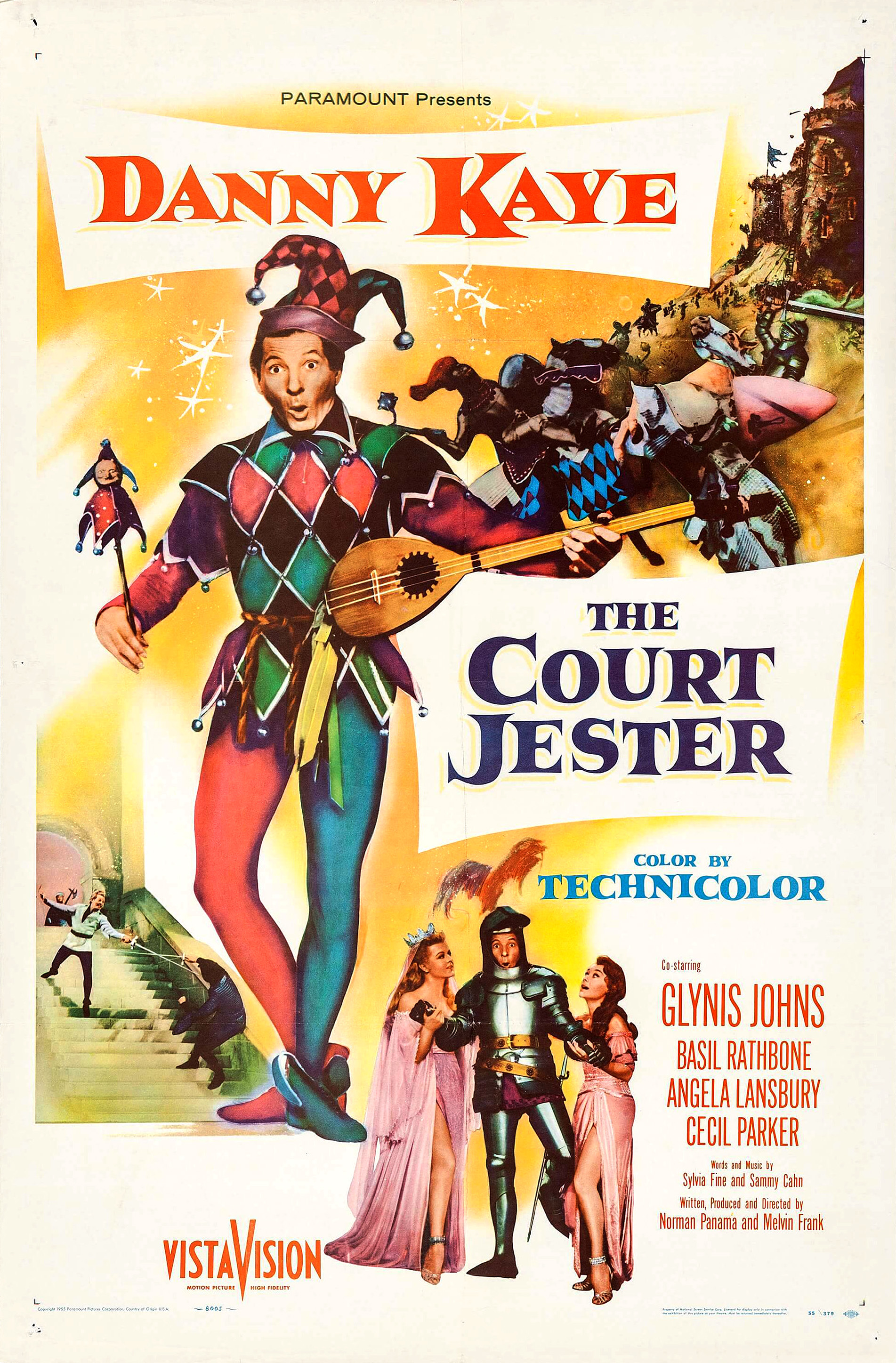
- Theatrical release poster
- Directed by: Norman Panama; Melvin Frank
- Written by: Norman Panama; Melvin Frank
- Produced by: Norman Panama; Melvin Frank
- Starring: Danny Kaye; Glynis Johns; Basil Rathbone; Angela Lansbury; Cecil Parker
- Cinematography: Ray June
- Edited by: Tom McAdoo
- Music by: Vic Schoen; Walter Scharf (Note: Uncredited)
- Production company: Dena Enterprises
- Distributed by: Paramount Pictures
- Release dates: December 24, 1955 (Japan); January 27, 1956 (United States)
- Running time: 101 minutes
- Country: United States
- Language: English
- Budget: $4 million
- Box office: $2.2 million (US and Canada rentals)

The Court Jester is a 1955 American historical musical comedy film starring Danny Kaye, Glynis Johns, Basil Rathbone, Angela Lansbury, and Cecil Parker. The film was written, produced, and directed by Norman Panama and Melvin Frank for distribution by Paramount Pictures. It was released in Technicolor and the VistaVision widescreen format.

The film centers on Hubert Hawkins, a carnival entertainer. He is a member of the Black Fox's band of rebels (a parody of Robin Hood and his Merry Men) who are protecting the true infant king of medieval England from a usurper. Events cause Hawkins to take the identity of an apparent court jester, who is actually an assassin, so he can spy in the usurping King's castle, where there are many people who wish to make use of the Jester for their own villainous ends. The film contains several songs (all sung by Kaye), makes heavy use of slapstick comedy and quick-witted wordplay, and is best remembered for the tongue twister "The pellet with the poison's in the vessel with the pestle; the chalice from the palace has the brew that is true!"

Though the film was not financially successful upon release, it has grown to be a beloved classic, earning high scores on Rotten Tomatoes. In 2004, The Court Jester was selected for preservation in the National Film Registry by the Library of Congress, being deemed "culturally, historically, or aesthetically significant".

== Plot ==
King Roderick the Tyrant, having sent Lord Ravenhurst to slaughter the Royal Family of England, usurps the throne. The Black Fox and his band of rebels rescue the true king, an infant with the royal "purple pimpernel" birthmark on his backside. They harass Roderick and his men while guarding the baby. Lords Brockhurst, Finsdale, and Pertwee convince the king to seek alliance with Sir Griswold of MacElwain, by offering him Roderick's daughter Gwendolyn in marriage. Gwendolyn objects, for the castle witch Griselda foretold a more gallant lover.

Hubert Hawkins, the Black Fox's minstrel, brings a troupe of acrobat-little people from the carnival to replace him so he can fight, but the Black Fox refuses. The King's men find their hideout, so Hawkins and another rebel, Maid Jean, are ordered to disguise themselves as wine merchants and take the baby to safety. They meet the king's newly hired jester, Giacomo, on the road. Jean knocks him out and tells Hawkins to steal his identity. Hawkins heads for the castle, and Jean travels on alone, but is captured by the king's men, who were ordered to bring the fairest wenches to the king's court.

Lord Ravenhurst tells a friend that Giacomo is actually an assassin whom he hired to kill Brockhurst, Finsdale, and Pertwee, to prevent the alliance. Simultaneously, Gwendolyn decides to kill Griselda for lying to her, until Griselda promises Giacomo as her prophesied lover. Hawkins, unaware of both these things, enters the castle and tries to make contact with a rebel confederate. However, Ravenhurst unwittingly appears at Hawkins' whistle signal, so Hawkins allies himself with Ravenhurst instead. Prior to Hawkins' arrival, Fergus the Hostler, the true confederate, already met up with Jean, and now has the baby hidden in a basket. Jean sneaks into the palace and steals a key to a secret passage from King Roderick's chambers.

Hawkins is put under a hypnotic spell by Griselda, and in that state woos the princess, receives his orders to kill the three lords from Ravenhurst, and obtains the key from Jean, but loses it back to the king. Hawkins forgets all this once the spell is gone. Fergus gives him the basket with the baby, but before he can get it to safety, Hawkins is called before the king. He distracts the king and crowd from noticing the basket with a well-received performance; Jean rescues the basket. Griselda, meanwhile, poisons the three lords' cups to prevent the alliance. Ravenhurst believes Hawkins killed them.

Griswold arrives, but Gwendolyn declares her love for "Giacomo", and Hawkins is arrested and jailed. Ravenhurst learns that Giacomo never arrived and concludes that Hawkins, having apparently sabotaged the alliance, must be the Black Fox. He convinces Roderick to rush Hawkins through the trials to become a knight so he can duel Griswold, ostensibly so Griswold can kill the jester but really so the Black Fox would eliminate Griswold.

Jean steals back the key. Fergus sends it by pigeon to the real Black Fox, but is caught and tortured to death by Ravenhurst's men. At the tournament, Griselda poisons one of the ceremonial drinks and tells Hawkins which. One of Griswold's men overhears and warns Griswold, and he and Hawkins both struggle to remember which of the glasses is poisoned (the famous "Vessel with the Pestle" routine) and end up not drinking the toast. Through sheer luck, Hawkins defeats Griswold in the duel, but spares his life and sends him away.

Ravenhurst finds the baby and exposes Hawkins as a traitor. However, the real Black Fox sends the midgets through the secret passage, and they rescue Hawkins, Jean, and the baby. Jean clubs the gate guard and lets the Black Fox's army into the castle. Threatened by Gwendolyn, Griselda hypnotizes Hawkins to become a master swordsman. He duels Ravenhurst, though the spell is accidentally switched on and off several times. Eventually, Hawkins and Jean launch Ravenhurst from a catapult into the sea.

Griswold returns with his army ready to kill the rebels, but Hawkins shows him the infant's purple pimpernel birthmark. Griswold kneels to the baby, as does everyone else, including Roderick. Hawkins leads everybody in song.

== Cast ==
- Danny Kaye as Hubert Hawkins, a minstrel who steals Giacomo the Jester's identity
- Glynis Johns as Maid Jean, a rebel captain and Hawkins' love interest
- Basil Rathbone as Lord Ravenhurst, the King's closest adviser
- Angela Lansbury as Gwendolyn, Princess of England
- Cecil Parker as Roderick, faux King of England and father of Gwendolyn
- Mildred Natwick as Griselda, a witch and adviser to Gwendolyn
- Robert Middleton as Sir Griswold of MacElwain, Gwendolyn's betrothed
- Michael Pate as Sir Locksley, Ravenhurst's lackey and ally
- Herbert Rudley as the Captain of the Guard, one of Ravenhurst's lackeys
- Noel Drayton as Fergus the Hostler, a spy of the Black Fox in Roderick's castle
- John Carradine as Giacomo, an Italian jester and assassin, hired by Ravenhurst
- Edward Ashley as the Black Fox, a rebel leader
- Alan Napier as Lord Brockhurst, adviser to Roderick
- Lewis Martin as Lord Finsdale, adviser to Roderick
- Patrick Aherne as Lord Pertwee, adviser to Roderick
- Richard Kean as Archbishop
- Hermine's Midgets as Hubert Hawkins' acrobatic troupe
- The American Legion Zouaves (of Richard F. Smith, Post No. 29, Jackson, Michigan) as the Marching Knights

== Musical score ==
Hollywood arranger and composer Vic Schoen was asked to provide the musical score for the film. Film composer Elmer Bernstein was hired as the assistant musical director to Schoen. The Court Jester was an enormous challenge for Schoen at the time because it was his first feature film. He was not formally trained on the mechanisms of how music was synchronized to film – he learned on the job. The film required 100 minutes of music for Schoen to compose and arrange. Some pieces in the film (also known as "cues") were very long, and took many hours for Schoen to finesse. One piece that Schoen was most proud of in his career was the chase music toward the end of the movie when Danny Kaye's character engages in a sword fight. Schoen wrote a mini piano concerto for this scene.

A pleasant surprise happened during the recording session of The Court Jester. The red "recording in progress" light was illuminated to ensure no interruptions, so Schoen started to conduct a cue but noticed that the entire orchestra had turned to look at Igor Stravinsky, who had just walked into the studio. Schoen said, "The entire room was astonished to see this short little man with a big chest walk in and listen to our session. I later talked with him after we were done recording. We went and got a cup of coffee together. After listening to my music Stravinsky told me 'You have broken all the rules'. At the time I didn't understand his comment because I had been self-taught. It took me years to figure out what he had meant."

However, the producers removed this score and commissioned an entirely new one from Hollywood veteran Walter Scharf. He wrote a new score from scratch but because of lack of time, Scharf insisted he did not want a credit for his work.

The film's opening song, "Life Could Not Better Be", breaks the fourth wall by having Kaye make direct reference to the filmmakers conducting "research".

== Audio version ==
In September 1955, Kaye recorded a nine-minute-long condensed version of The Court Jester for 1956 release by Decca Records on the two-part single K 166. In the simplified version of the storyline, the characters of Hubert and the Black Fox are merged, Lord Ravenhurst is replaced by an unnamed evil king, and Jean is dropped entirely. It features excerpts from several of the film's songs ("Outfox the Fox", "I'll Take You Dreaming", "My Heart Knows a Lovely Song", and the finale version of "Life Could Not Better Be").

== Reception ==
=== Critical reception ===
The New York Times was complimentary in its review: "No use to try to trace the story as it riotously unfolds. We vaguely suspect that proved too tiresome for even Messrs. Panama and Frank. There are all sorts of beautiful, babbling stretches of sheer obscurity along the way. But in every—or almost every—mix-up, there is the all-things-to-all-men Mr. Kaye. ... this story does not have subtlety. Nor does Mr. Kaye's portrayal in it have firm personality. He is just a funny fellow bounced all over the place, with surprisingly few songs to help him. The farce lacks finish—or even form. But Mr. Kaye plays it adroitly, and so do ... Parker ... Lansbury ... Johns ... Rathbone ... and many, many more. The color and costuming are gaudy, and the whole thing ... has the audacious size and splash about it that mark it shrewdly made for commerce. It's good fun." The Philadelphia Inquirer was enthusiastic as well: "Danny Kaye...is back and all's well in the comedy world....Kaye is just about at the top of his varied and wonderful form....The hairbreadth adventures concocted as showcase for his elastic talent and bright with invention and sly enough to make even producers of straight costume pieces of this order laugh at themselves....there are five engaging songs by Sylvia Fine and Sammy Cahn, lush sets, and costumes all enhanced by Technicolor and VistaVision, and an enthusiastic cast which backs up Danny every merry inch of the way."

The New York Post was equally positive: "This is wonderful Danny Kaye material, giving full scope to his genius for movement, sound and subtle travesty....An English quartet contributes lightly and well to the merriment. Cecil Parker...Angela Lansbury....Basil Rathbone...and Glynis Johns....But it is the comic invention, both in plot an slapstick moment, that sets this musical upon its higher plane. It's always babbling along merrily, and never does let down....This is a picture that can be recommended to all and sundry." The Oakland Tribune thought the film entertaining: "Kaye...makes comic mincemeat out of all movie derring-do that's ever been done...in a plot that doesn't attempt to make much sense, except as an all-around spoof of knights, jousting, court life and royal intrigue....Kaye sings several ditties...none of these is memorable, but the Sylvia Fine lyrics are amusing as always, especially in the patter numbers at which Kaye is particularly adept. During some of the scenes—played straight by Miss Natwick, Rathbone, Miss Lansbury, Miss Johns and Parker—I got the impression that if the action had lasted a second longer the performers would have burst into uncontrollable laughter at their own lines. You can't help but enjoy 'The Court Jester,' even if it cannot be labelled as Kaye's best movie."

The St. Louis Globe-Democrat described the film as "a large scale, lavishly mounted, sometimes riotous comedy romp....As some of his others, this one points up the two problems faced by producers in fashioning starring vehicles for the lanky star. In the first place, there is the challenge of his versatility. It's a formidable task to provide material giving full range to his many and varied talents as singer, dancer, mimic, clown, and just plain low comic. Beyond that there is the danger the comedian will be so clever that much of the humor will sail over the heads of moviegoers inaccustomed to subtleties. In the first respect, his present sponsors, Paramount Pictures, have done exceeding [sic] well by Danny....Kaye's fat and juicy role is that of a circus clown who becomes what the title says....the triple-threat [Panama-Frank] team has gone on to devise a serious of situations that give full range to Kaye's versatility." The Los Angeles Evening News liked the movie: "a vastly entertaining piece of celluloid flying the Paramount banner....Kaye isn't a comedian only....Kaye's chief asset is amazing versatility, and the variety he brings to the role....Storywise, the film is farfetched, but this doesn't matter....he evokes many laughs, and he gets some fine help from Glynis Johns...Basil Rathbone...Angela Lansbury...Cecil Parker...and Mildred Natwick....Panama and Frank...rate a nod for a first-rate three-way accomplishment."

Time magazine was certain of the film's entertainment value: "The Court Jester...is a pleasantly goofy travesty of the olden daze into which Hollywood falls so often and so profitably....When the squirrely-burly's done, Jester Kaye has managed to get the false king on his knees, the true one on the throne, the heroine (Glynis Johns) in his arms, the villain on his point, and the audience happily lost in some muddle ages that no history book records." The Chicago Tribune review was mixed: "The story strains to provide comical situations and, if it weren't for Kaye's talent, would be remarkably dull. However, Danny bounces around energetically, mugging and singing and clowning, and manages to draw a few guffaws from an audience which seemed rather disinterested the day I saw the picture. Cecil Parker, Glynis Johns, Angela Lansbury, and Mildred Natwick are outstanding....It's Danny's picture, but not one of his best"

Costing $4 million (equivalent to $36.5 million in 2024) in the fall of 1955, The Court Jester was the most expensive comedy film produced up to that time. The motion picture bombed at the box office upon its release, bringing in only $2.2 million in receipts the following winter and spring of 1956 (equivalent to $19.4 million in 2024). However, since then it has become a classic and a television matinee favorite. On Rotten Tomatoes, the film holds an approval rating of 97% based on 30 reviews, with a weighted average rating of 8/10. The site's critical consensus reads, "A witty spoof of medieval swashbuckler movies, The Court Jester showcases Danny Kaye at his nimble, tongue-twisting best." Author and film critic Leonard Maltin awarded the film four out of a possible four stars, calling it "one of the best comedies ever made".

David Koenig reflects on Danny Kaye's legacy and The Court Jester, "His legacy has dimmed with the passage of time. His greatest works ... endure today only as memories in the minds of aging members of his audiences ... much of his TV work has not aged particularly well. Whimsy was of another time". However, Koenig sees Kaye's film work in a different light, "History has smiled on individual pictures—in particular the holiday staple of White Christmas and The Court Jester ... the medieval romp has steadily gained a reputation as one of the greatest comedies of all time."

=== Awards and honors ===
In 1957, Danny Kaye received a Golden Globe nomination for Best Motion Picture Actor – Comedy/Musical, and in 2000, the American Film Institute placed the film on its 100 Years...100 Laughs list, where it was ranked #98. In 2004, the United States National Film Registry elected to preserve The Court Jester for being "culturally, historically, or aesthetically significant".

== See also ==
- List of American films of 1956
- List of American films of 1955
