= Diane-Monique Daviau =

Canadian educator, writer and journalist

Diane-Monique Daviau (born 1951) is a Quebec educator, writer, translator and journalist.

== Biography ==
She was born in Montreal. Daviau wrote literary columns for Le Devoir, Lettres québécoises and Liberté, also contributing to the radio programs En toutes lettres, Littératures actuelles and Paysages littéraires on Radio Canada FM. She has taught literature, German and translation at McGill University, at the Université de Montréal and at the Goethe-Institut. Daviau was an editor for several publishing houses and also worked as a translator from German to French and from French to German. She served on the editorial committees for Lettres québécoises and for XYZ, la revue de la nouvelle. Daviau contributed to various literary events and festivals in Quebec and served on the juries for several literary competitions, including the Governor General's Awards, Radio-Canada's short story contest and the Prix littéraire Adrienne-Choquette. She also participates in a Quebec program where authors visit schools to speak to students.

Her first book Dessins à la plume, a collection of stories, was nominated for the Grand Prix littéraire de la Ville de Montréal in 1980; Ma mère et Gainsbourg was nominated for the Grand Prix du livre de Montréal in 1999 and for the Grand Prix of the readers of Elle Quebec magazine in 2000. She was writer-in-residence at the literary studies department at the Université du Québec à Montréal and at the Maison Gabrielle-Roy at Petite-Rivière-Saint-François.

== Selected works ==
- Histoires entre quatre murs (1981)
- L'Autre, l'une (1987), with Suzanne Robert
- Dernier accrochage (1990)
- La vie passe comme une étoile filante (1993)
- Une femme s'en va, novel (2004)
- Tout ce qui m'arrive à moi, youth literature (2012)
