= The Foundling (Heyer novel) =

1948 romance novel by Georgette Heyer

- First edition
- Author: Georgette Heyer
- Language: English
- Genre: Regency, Romance
- Publisher: William Heinemann
- Publication date: 1948
- Publication place: United Kingdom
- Media type: Print (Hardback & Paperback)
- Pages: 432 pp
- Preceded by: The Reluctant Widow
- Followed by: Arabella

The Foundling is a Regency romance novel written by Georgette Heyer and published by William Heinemann Ltd in 1948. It was also serialised in the Woman's Journal as "His Grace, the Duke of Sale", followed by a Book Club edition in 1949.

== Plot summary ==
The Most Noble Adolphus Gillespie Vernon Ware, seventh Duke of Sale (and known to his friends as Gilly), is a formerly sickly child who has been raised by his uncle and guardian, Lord Lionel Ware, with the help of a team of devoted but overbearing servants. As he nears his 25th birthday and the reversion of the guardianship, the Duke has grown tired of his circumscribed existence and longs to lead the anonymous life of "Mr Dash of Nowhere in Particular". Now he is further unsettled after proposing at his uncle's suggestion to his childhood friend, Lady Harriet Presteigne, on the eve of her leaving for Bath to stay with her grandmother, Lady Ampleforth

One of his young cousins, Matt, confesses to Gilly that he is being blackmailed over indiscreet letters he has written to the beautiful foundling Belinda, who has now disappeared. Gilly decides that attempting to recover the letters presents the perfect opportunity to get away from his suffocating family circle and in this is encouraged by his cousin and close friend, Gideon Ware, a member of the Royal Horse Guards. The threats have come from Swithin Liversedge, who claims to be Belinda's guardian and the protector of her honour, presently living at The Bird in Hand, a country inn outside Baldock.

Tavelling incognito under the name of Rufford so as to conceal his whereabouts from the rest of his family, Gilly sets off in a gig for the Hertfordshire town. On the way he encounters the teenage Tom Mamble, who had been running away from his tutor and had been violently waylaid by footpads along the road. From then on the scrapes the boy gets into become a continual hindrance and source of amusement to the Duke in their travels together. Gilly tracks down Liversedge, who underestimates his adversary and is knocked out, following which the Duke is appealed to by Belinda for protection. The sixteen-year-old girl is impulsive and far from bright. At Liversedge's suggestion, she had broken her apprenticeship articles with a seamstress in Bath but longs to go back and find again a nearby farmer there, Jasper Mudgley, who wished to marry her.

The discomforted Liversedge, having discovered the Duke's true identity, now persuades one of his criminal associates to kidnap Gilly and earn the gang a fortune by holding him to ransom in the cellar of The Bird in Hand. But soon Gilly manages to escape and burns down the house while doing so. Meanwhile Liversedge had left for London to arrange the ransom and was unwary enough to threaten the brawny Gideon, who rushes off to Baldock conscience-stricken and forces Liversedge to accompany him. They arrive too late, however, for Gilly, Tom and Belinda have now gone by chaise and coach across country to Bath.

In order to find a safe harbour for Belinda, Gilly asks Harriet to take her in while he goes in search of Mudgley, but he is hindered when Tom's father, a wealthy Kettering ironmonger, has the Duke arrested for kidnapping his son. Harriet comes to his rescue, rather enjoying the adventure, and soon Gideon, as well as the Duke's valet Nettlebed, and Lord Lionel, arrive in Bath too by different routes. They discover in Gilly a changed and more self-confident man intent on having his way in future. He and Harriet, both of whom had previously been counselled by elderly advisors that it is indecorous to show their affection for each other, now feel free to declare their love.

One final complication is the appearance of Harriet's brother Gaywood, who attempts to abduct Belinda but is hoodwinked by Tom. Meanwhile Gilly has at last discovered that Jasper Mudgley's farm is on the edge of one of his nearby estates and unites the lovers. When the outraged Gaywood challenges Gilly to a duel over his interference, Tom leaps to the Duke's defence with fists raised, until his father re-establishes his own family authority and leads Tom off by the ear to the amusement of all.

== Reception ==
The Foundling is set in the autumn of 1818. Heyer's biographer, Jennifer Kloester, compares the novel with Jane Austen's Emma as having certain themes in common. She also quotes, as a stylistic parallel with Austen, the Duke's observation in the final chapter that Belinda "will always be silly, but [Jasper] appears to have considerable constancy, and we must hope that he will always be fond", a point noted by the reviewer in The Times Literary Supplement at the time of The Foundling's first appearance.

In a letter to the author, Arnold Glyde, head of Heinemann's editorial department, noted that the sense of comedy, present in most of Heyer's novels, had here been "developed…into a really flowering success". Richard Match, in his review of the book for The New York Times, corroborated this judgment; in his opinion, "Miss Heyer’s talent is elegant farce". Heyer herself had her doubts about the novel's rambling, repetitious nature and wondered "whether I shall let it stand as it is – a leisurely, long book – or whether I shall ruthlessly cut & re-write."
