= The Telephone Call (novel) =

1948 novel by John Rgode

- First edition
- Author: John Rhode
- Language: English
- Series: Lancelot Priestley
- Genre: Detective
- Publisher: Geoffrey Bles (UK); Dodd Mead (US)
- Publication date: 1948
- Publication place: United Kingdom
- Media type: Print
- Preceded by: The Paper Bag
- Followed by: Blackthorn House

The Telephone Call is a 1948 detective novel by John Rhode, the pen name of the British writer Cecil Street. It is the forty-seventh in his long-running series of novels featuring Lancelot Priestley, a Golden Age armchair detective. It was published in America by Dodd Mead under the alternative title Shadow of an Alibi. It is based on the real-life Wallace Case of 1931 in which William Herbert Wallace was convicted of murdering his wife Julia, a conviction which was later overturned on appeal.

== Bibliography ==
- Evans, Curtis. Masters of the "Humdrum" Mystery: Cecil John Charles Street, Freeman Wills Crofts, Alfred Walter Stewart and the British Detective Novel, 1920-1961. McFarland, 2014.
- Herbert, Rosemary. Whodunit?: A Who's Who in Crime & Mystery Writing. Oxford University Press, 2003.
- Magill, Frank Northen . Critical Survey of Mystery and Detective Fiction: Authors, Volume 4. Salem Press, 1988.
- Reilly, John M. Twentieth Century Crime & Mystery Writers. Springer, 2015.
