= Jacques St. Germain =

Vampire legend

Jacques St. Germain is a legendary vampire originating in the folklore of 20th century New Orleans. In local legend, he is associated with the historical Count of St. Germain.

== Legend ==
According to legend, Jacques St. Germain moved to New Orleans from France in 1902. He claimed to be a descendant of the Count of St. Germain. St. Germain earned a reputation for entertaining New Orleans' aristocracy with luxurious dinner parties, although he never partook of the food served. Because of his wealth and mysterious background, rumors circulated about him in New Orleans high society. St. Germain is described as a womanizer who went into the French Quarter nightly to meet young women. One night, screams were heard coming from St. Germain's home after he brought a woman home from the bar. The woman jumped from the second-story of his house, telling bystanders that she had been attacked by her host, who had seized her and bitten her on the neck. When police searched St. Germain's home they found bloodstains and wine bottles filled with blood, with St. Germain missing. The woman died later at Charity Hospital.

== In folklore and popular culture ==
St. Germain is a well known figure of urban legend in New Orleans, with supposed sightings and attacks being attributed to him by locals. According to the urban legend surrounding St. Germain, he has reappeared throughout history, having never aged. The legend has inspired cocktails, and his reputed residence on Royal Street has become a tourist attraction.

The legend of St. Germain was featured on Mysteries Decoded, in the season 1 episode "Vampires of New Orleans" as well as in season 2, episode 6 of Mysteries at the Monument.
