= Buried for Pleasure =

1948 mystery novel by Edmund Crispin

- First Edition
- Author: Edmund Crispin
- Language: English
- Series: Gervase Fen
- Genre: Detective
- Publisher: Gollancz
- Publication date: 1948
- Publication place: United Kingdom
- Media type: Print
- Preceded by: Love Lies Bleeding
- Followed by: Frequent Hearses

Buried for Pleasure is a 1948 detective novel by the British writer Edmund Crispin, the sixth in his series featuring the Oxford professor and amateur detective Gervase Fen. As with the rest of the Fen novels, a complex Golden Age-style mystery is combined with elements of farce. Fen contests a by-election in rural constituency, but events are rapidly overtaken by a murder case. It features Detective Inspector Humbleby who also appeared in the next novel Frequent Hearses as well as most of the short stories in the series.

== Synopsis ==
Having felt the need for a sudden career change, Fen stands for Parliament as an independent in a country constituency with which he has no previous connection and turns up just a week beforing polling day. Basing himself in a pub in a village, he is assisted by the raffish but enthusiastic election agent Captain Watkyns. Before long his unorthodox campaigning style has won him enough support to make it seem that he will pull off an unlikely victory. Already having second thoughts about life as a politician, Fen is contemplating taking the Chiltern Hundreds if sent to Westminster.

Among the various distractions he experiences are the owner of the inn where he is staying slowly demolishing it around him to rebuild it, an escaped lunatic from the asylum in a nearby country house and the enthusiastic friendship of Mr. Judd, a local resident and writer of lurid detective novels under a female pseudonym. Most importantly he encounters an old acquaintance, a Scotland Yard man Bussy, who is staying at the same inn incognito while investigating the poisoning of a woman without the knowledge of the local force. Shortly after Bussy requests Fen's assistance in solving the crime, he is found late at night with a knife in him at a local golf club.

Joining forces with Wolfe of the local police and Humbleby, another officer sent down from London, Fen pieces together a string of seemingly unrelated clues to build his case against the culprit. Having revealed an attempt to frame the escaped lunatic for the killing, and following an attempted murder on another of the residents at the inn, he is at last ready to make it public on the very night the results of the election are announced.

== Reception ==
Reviewing the novel in The Guardian, Ralph Partridge wrote "The less said about Crispin’s latest, the better for his reputation. There was a picaresque tinge in some of the earlier books. In Buried for Pleasure the author frankly unbuttons, and lets Professor Fen run riot as a Parliamentary candidate at a rural bye-election".

== Bibliography ==
- Bargainnier, Earl F. Comic Crime. Popular Press, 1987.
- Hubin, Allen J. Crime Fiction, 1749–1980: A Comprehensive Bibliography. Garland Publishing, 1984.
- Reilly, John M. Twentieth Century Crime & Mystery Writers. Springer, 2015.
- Whittle, David. Bruce Montgomery/Edmund Crispin: A Life in Music and Books. Routledge, 2017.
