= Elephant Walk =

1954 film by William Dieterle

- Theatrical rerelease poster
- Directed by: William Dieterle
- Written by: John Lee Mahin
- Based on: Elephant Walk; 1948 novel by Robert Standish
- Produced by: Irving Asher
- Starring: Elizabeth Taylor; Dana Andrews; Peter Finch; Abraham Sofaer; Abner Biberman
- Cinematography: Loyal Griggs
- Edited by: George Tomasini
- Music by: Franz Waxman
- Production company: Paramount Pictures
- Distributed by: Paramount Pictures
- Release dates: April 21, 1954 (New York); May 26, 1954 (Los Angeles)
- Running time: 103 minutes
- Country: United States
- Language: English
- Budget: $3 million
- Box office: $3 million (US)

Elephant Walk is a 1954 American drama film produced by Paramount Pictures, directed by William Dieterle and starring Elizabeth Taylor, Dana Andrews, Peter Finch and Abraham Sofaer. It is based upon the 1948 novel Elephant Walk by Robert Standish, the pseudonym of English novelist Digby George Gerahty (1898–1981).

Much of the film was shot on location, offering glimpses into the operation of tea plantations and the tea-production process within factories.

== Plot ==
Colonial tea planter John Wiley, visiting England at the end of World War II, marries Ruth and takes her home to Elephant Walk Bungalow, the plantation house built by his father in Ceylon. They are stopped by a bull Indian elephant on their way to the house, and John frightens it away with a few gunshots. Ruth discovers that John is still dominated by his father, whom he calls the governor, long after his death, and that John's mother was never happy at Elephant Walk. She had left John's father shortly after their marriage but returned when she became pregnant.

Ruth has a strained relationship with Appuhamy, the principal servant, whose real master continues to be the late governor. Appuhamy regularly speaks to the governor at his tomb, expressing his dislike of the new mistress. A very stern, large portrait of the governor is kept in his room, which has not been changed since the governor died.

Ruth learns from John that Elephant Walk was so named because his father Tom Wiley deliberately built it across the path used by a herd of elephants to reach a water source. The elephants continue to attempt to use their ancient path but are blocked by the walls and the defensive efforts of the servants. Ruth feels isolated as the only European woman in the district and is dismayed by her husband's occasional arrogance and angry outbursts as well as Appuhamy's attitude toward her.

When the district is afflicted with a cholera epidemic, Ruth serves as a relief worker. Appuhamy confesses at the governor's tomb that he was wrong about Ruth and that he hopes that she will stay. Ruth has made John realize that, as long as they stay at Elephant Walk, he will continue to be dominated by his dead father instead of becoming his own man, so they must leave.

The elephants finally manage to defeat the wall and stampede onto the grounds, killing Appuhamy. The bungalow is smashed and erupts in flames. The portrait of the governor is burning, symbolizing the end of the old regime. John and Ruth escape as the house begins to collapse around them. Dick Carver sees them together in the hills just above the house and realizes that Ruth will never be his.

As John and Ruth look down upon Elephant Walk burning to the ground, it begins to rain and John resolves to build a new home for them elsewhere.

== Cast ==
- Elizabeth Taylor as Ruth Wiley
- Dana Andrews as Dick Carver
- Peter Finch as John Wiley, Ruth's husband
- Abraham Sofaer as Appuhamy
- Abner Biberman as Doctor Pereira
- Noel Drayton as Chief Planter Atkinson
- Rosalind Ivan as Mrs. Lakin
- Barry Bernard as Planter Strawson
- Philip Tonge as Planter John Ralph
- Edward Ashley-Cooper as Gordon Gregory (credited as Edward Ashley)
- Leo Britt as Planter Chisholm
- Mylee Haulani as Rayna

== Production ==
The film is based on the 1948 novel Elephant Walk by Robert Standish, the pseudonym of English novelist Digby George Gerahty. Film rights to the story were originally bought by Douglas Fairbanks, Jr. and Alexander MacDonald for their production company, Dougfair. D. M. Marshman Jr. was hired to write the script. Fairbanks and MacDonald transferred the rights to Paramount Pictures, where Irving Asher was assigned as producer. John Lee Mahin was hired to write the script and William Dieterle agreed to direct.

The film was originally intended to star the husband-and-wife team of Laurence Olivier and Vivien Leigh, but Olivier was already committed to The Beggar's Opera (1953). Olivier was replaced by his protege Peter Finch, with Dana Andrews playing the other male lead. Leigh was enthusiastic about the role and continued in Olivier's absence, but she was forced to withdraw shortly after filming began in Colombo, Ceylon as a result of her bipolar disorder. According to Leonard Maltin's Movie Guide, Leigh can be seen in some long shots that were not replaced after Elizabeth Taylor replaced her.

Filming began in Ceylon in February 1953 and was postponed because of poor weather. After four weeks of location work, the unit moved to Hollywood for six weeks of studio filming. When Leigh withdrew, Elizabeth Taylor was borrowed from MGM to replace her.

== Reception ==
In a contemporary review for The New York Times, critic Bosley Crowther wrote: "[T]hat's the situation in this new Technicolored Paramount film—menacing elephants and a father-in-law's dark shadow. No wonder poor Miss Taylor acts so scared. No wonder she soon finds her new husband, Peter Finch, just a bit of a bore and starts riding out with Mr. Andrews to see how the tea plants are coming along. And, we might add, no wonder the picture becomes a bit of a bore, too. This sort of menace melodrama has to be done awfully well to hold. Unfortunately, the script that John Lee Mahin prepared from the Robert Standish book is lengthy and hackneyed in the build-up, and William Dieterle's direction does not provide anything more than gaudy panoramas of a tropical palace to fascinate the eye. Miss Taylor's performance of the young wife is petulant and smug."

Critic Philip K. Scheuer of the Los Angeles Times wrote: "William Dieterle, a thorough director, has paced John Lee Mahin's screen play so deliberately that it comes nearly to a standstill at dead center. Nevertheless, he does build up an air of portentous menace and is notably successful in capturing the decadence that overtakes the white man in the midst of the encroaching jungle."

According to Kinematograph Weekly, the film was a "money maker" at the British box office in 1954.
