= Hans Fischer (painter) =

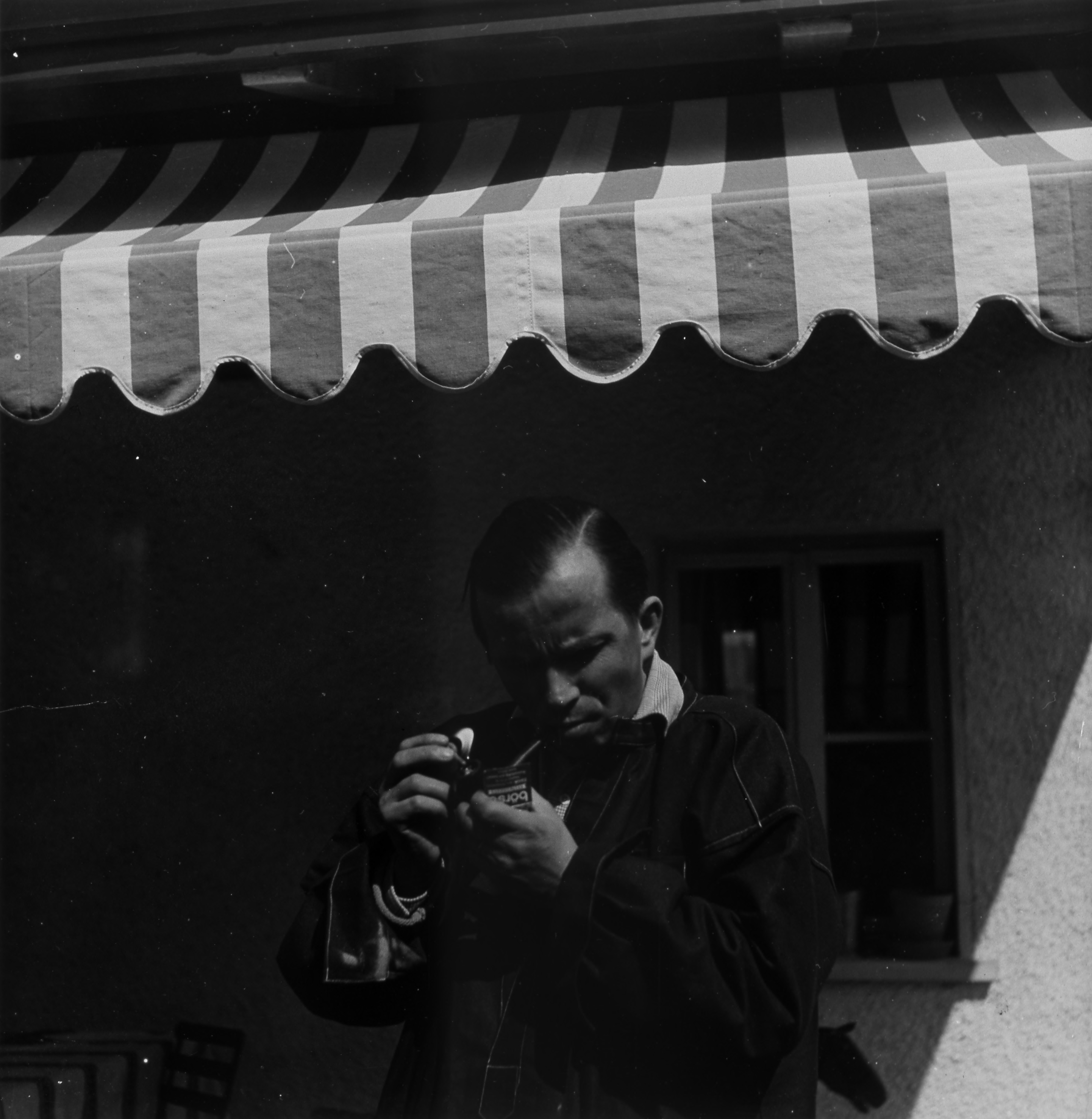
- Fischer in 1950
- Born: 6 January 1909; Bern, Switzerland
- Died: 19 April 1958 (aged 49); Interlaken, Switzerland
- Other name: Fis
- Known for: Graphic art, illustration, drawing, murals, stage design
- Notable work: Pitschi

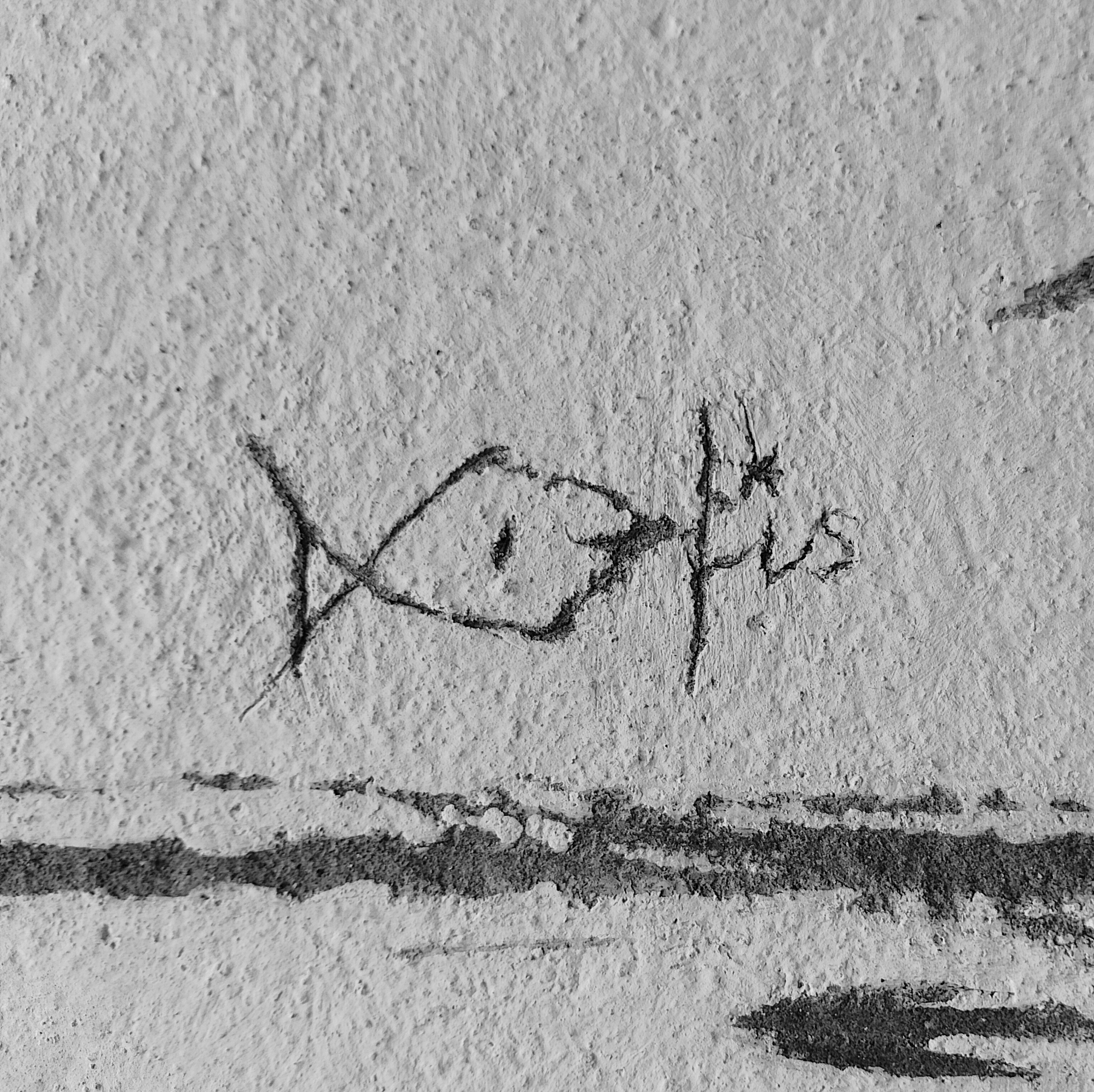
Fischer’s signature fis

Hans Fischer (6 January 1909 – 19 April 1958), known as Fis, was a Swiss artist and illustrator. He became widely known for writing and illustrating the picture book Pitschi, which was translated into numerous languages. In 1955, he received a graphic art prize at the São Paulo Art Biennial.

== Biography ==
Hans Fischer, known as Fis, was born in Bern on 6 January 1909. After attending the literary gymnasium in Bern, Fischer went on to the École des beaux-arts et arts industriels in Geneva and the Kunstgewerbeschule in Zürich, where he studied under Otto Meyer-Amden. From 1931 to 1932, he lived in Paris, working in advertising and taking evening courses at the Académie Fernand Léger. In 1933, he married Bianca Wassmuth. In 1934, he created his first picture book, The Bremen Town Musicians (Die Bremer Stadtmusikanten), for his daughter Ursula.

Fischer returned to Bern, where he worked from 1932 to 1936 as an animation artist, window-display designer and graphic artist. He contributed to several Swiss periodicals, including Nebelspalter, Die Schweiz and Die Weltwoche. In 1937, he completed his first mural, Fische im Netz, at Tierpark Dählhölzli in Bern. He moved to Zürich in the same year and worked as a stage designer for Cabaret Cornichon until 1941. During this period, he produced around 300 stage designs for the cabaret.

From 1944, book illustration became his main field of work. From 1949 until his death, Fischer lived with his family in Feldmeilen, near Zürich. He received first prize at the Mostra di Bianco e Nero in Lugano in 1954 and a graphic art prize at the São Paulo Art Biennial in 1955. He died in Interlaken on 19 April 1958.

== Work ==
Fischer worked as a graphic artist, draughtsman, children’s book illustrator and author. His practice extended from graphic work and illustration to murals and stage design. In 1948, he published Pitschi, a fable that he both wrote and illustrated. The book was later translated into numerous languages. Fischer became widely known for the picture books Pitschi and Der Geburtstag.

His drawings often used humour and fairy-tale imagery. Drawing was central to Fischer’s work, which is marked by delicate linear compositions and imaginative figures drawn from animals, plants and fable. He drew on German fairy tales, La Fontaine’s fables, and Swiss legendary and customary traditions. Over time, his work showed an increasing tendency toward abstraction.

== Exhibitions ==
Fischer had an exhibition at the Kunsthalle Bern in 1945 and exhibited with Ernst Morgenthaler at the Kunstmuseum Chur in 1946–1947. Further solo exhibitions followed at Kunstsalon Wolfsberg in Zürich and the Musée de l’Athénée in Geneva in 1948–1949. In 1952, he participated in the Venice Biennale.

A retrospective was held at Kunsthaus Zürich in 1959. In 2009, Galerie Pendo in Zürich marked Fischer’s centenary with an exhibition of works from three decades.

== Gallery ==
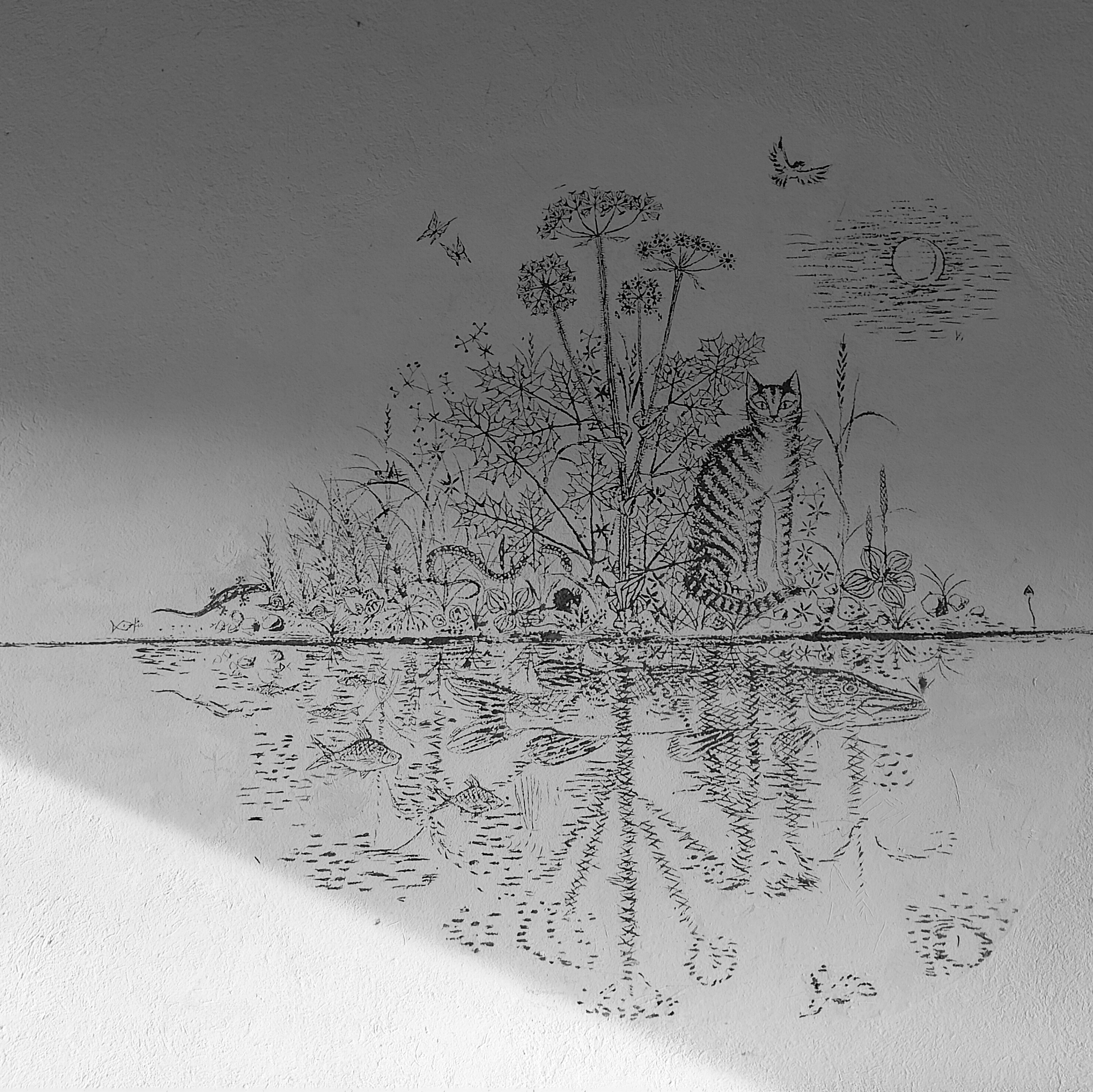
Untitled sgraffito, Schulhaus Pünt, Uster, 1948–1950

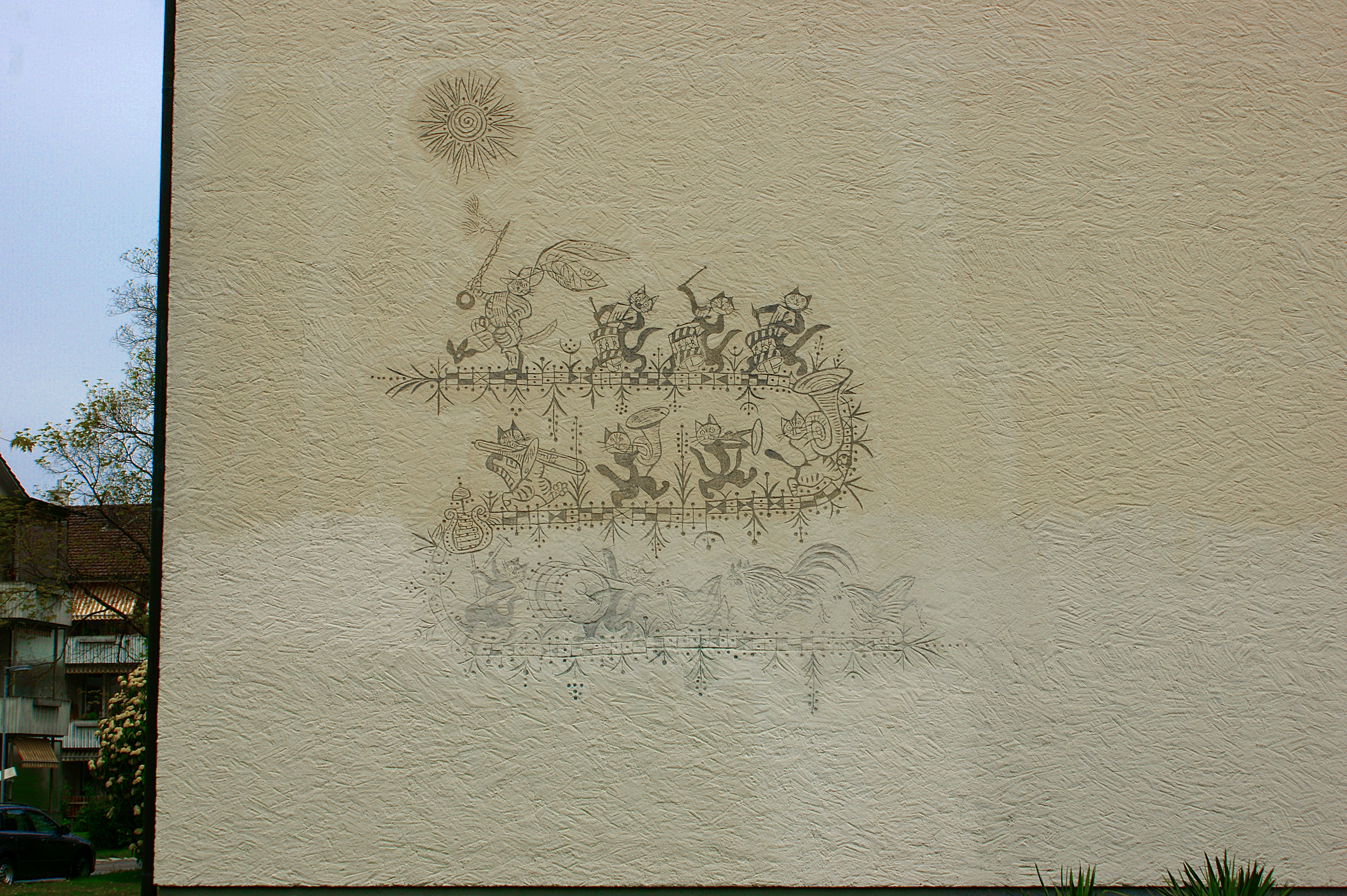
Music-making Cats and Chickens, sgraffito, Siedlung Meienegg, Bern, 1950

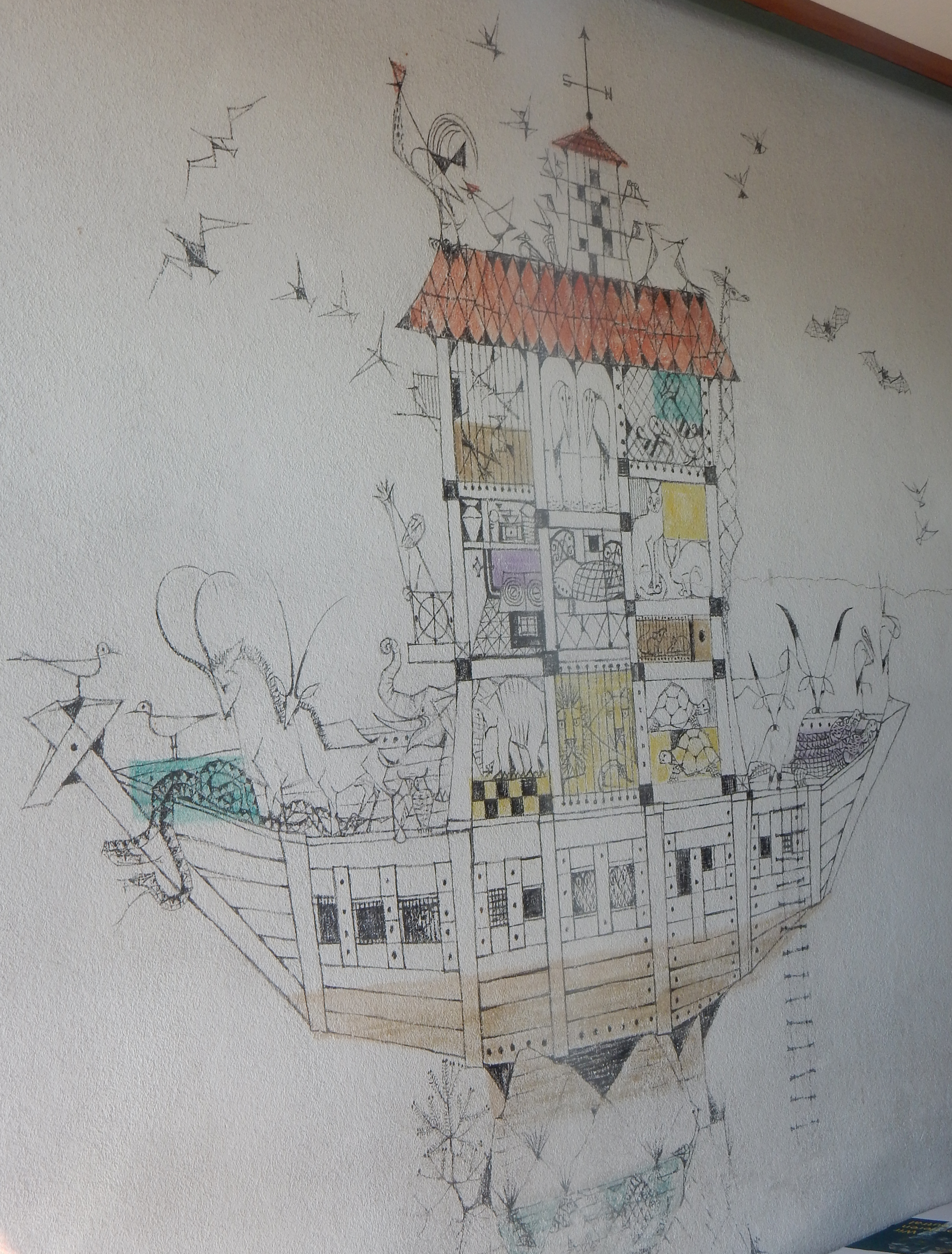
Noah’s Ark, sgraffito, Primarschulhaus Buchsee, Köniz, 1951
