= The Moving Toyshop =

1946 mystery novel by Edmund Crispin

- First edition 1946
- Author: Edmund Crispin
- Language: English
- Series: Gervase Fen
- Genre: Detective fiction
- Publisher: Victor Gollancz
- Publication date: 1946
- Publication place: England
- Media type: Print
- Preceded by: Holy Disorders
- Followed by: Swan Song

First US edition (publ. Lippincott)

The Moving Toyshop (1946) is a work of detective fiction by Edmund Crispin, featuring his recurrent sleuth, Gervase Fen, an Oxford professor of English Language and Literature.

== Plot ==
Famous poet Richard Cadogan takes an impromptu holiday to Oxford, where he studied at the university, after growing bored with the literary life in the suburbs. After finding himself in a high street, in the middle of the night and with no place to stay, he stumbles across a shop with its awning still up. Closer inspection reveals it to be a toyshop, and on finding the door unlocked, curiosity leads Cadogan inside, then up a flight of stairs to a flat where he finds the murdered body of an elderly woman, before being knocked unconscious. He wakes up the next morning in a supply closet, but after escaping and bringing back the police, the toyshop is no longer there, replaced, it seems, with a grocer's.

Bewildered, Cadogan turns to an old friend at the University of Oxford, eccentric professor and amateur sleuth Gervase Fen, to help him solve the mystery of the moving toyshop.

== Title ==
The title comes from Pope's The Rape of the Lock:

With varying vanities, from every part,
They shift the moving toyshop of their heart

== Dedication ==
The novel is dedicated to the poet Philip Larkin, Crispin's contemporary at St John's College, Oxford. In chapter 10, tongue-in-cheek reference is made to Larkin, with the mention of an undergraduate essay called "The Influence of Sir Gawain on Arnold's Empedocles on Etna", about which Fen comments: "Good heavens, that must be Larkin: the most indefatigable searcher out of pointless correspondences the world has ever known."

== Influence ==
The book provided the source for the famous merry-go-round sequence at the climax of Alfred Hitchcock's Strangers on a Train. All the major elements of the scene – the two men struggling, the accidentally shot attendant, the out-of-control merry-go-round, and the crawling under the moving merry-go-round to disable it – are present in Crispin's novel, though he received no screen credit for it.

== Reception and legacy ==
In 2006, detective novelist P. D. James picked The Moving Toyshop as one of her five "most riveting crime novels". About Crispin, she said, "[He] is one of the few mystery writers able to combine situation comedy and high spirits with detection."

Other crime writers have also given praise to Crispin for the paciness and humour of his work. Scottish crime writer Val McDermid called The Moving Toyshop, ""A classic crime novel with a surreal streak… It's a clever, energetic romp, written with wit", while A. L. Kennedy described Crispin as, "One of the undiscovered treasures of British crime fiction: [his] storytelling is intelligent, humane, surprising and rattling good fun."
