= Edmund Crispin =

British composer and crime novelist (1921–1978)

- Photo of Crispin on the cover of his biography
- Born: Robert Bruce Montgomery; 2 October 1921; Chesham Bois, Buckinghamshire, United Kingdom
- Died: 15 September 1978 (aged 56); West Hampstead, London, United Kingdom
- Other name: Bruce Montgomery
- Occupations: Writer, Composer
- Years active: 1944-1978

Robert Bruce Montgomery (2 October 1921 – 15 September 1978) was an English crime writer and composer. Known as a composer as Bruce Montgomery, he published his detective novels under the pseudonym Edmund Crispin.

He was known for his detective novels featuring Gervase Fen, starting with The Case of the Gilded Fly (1944), and for composing the scores for the early films in the Carry On series.

== Life and work ==
Montgomery was born at 'Blackwood', Bois Lane, Chesham Bois, Buckinghamshire, fourth child and only son of Robert Ernest Montgomery (1878-1962) and Marion Blackwood, née Jarvie. His father, of Irish origin, was principal clerk in the India Office and formerly secretary to the High Commissioner of India. His family later settled at Hanwell, in the London Borough of Ealing. Montgomery's mother was Scottish, of a family claiming illegitimate descent from Bonnie Prince Charlie. When Montgomery was two years old, his family moved round the corner to 'Domus', a "big house in a rural setting" that was built according to his father's instructions.

He was educated at Merchant Taylors' School and graduated from St John's College, Oxford, in 1943, with a BA in modern languages, having for two years been its organ scholar and choirmaster. While there he became friendly with Philip Larkin and Kingsley Amis. From 1943 to 1945 he taught at Shrewsbury School and began writing the first of his detective novels. Montgomery encouraged Larkin's writing ambitions, and according to Andrew Motion "by combining a devoted commitment to writing with a huge appetite for drinking and fooling around, he gave Larkin a model of the ways in which art could avoid pretension".

He first became established under his own name as a composer of vocal and choral music, including An Oxford Requiem (1951), but later turned to film work, writing the scores for many British comedies of the 1950s. For the Carry On series he composed six scores (Sergeant, Nurse, Teacher, Constable, Regardless and Cruising), including the original Carry On theme subsequently adapted for later films by Eric Rogers. He also composed the scores to four films in the Doctor film series (House, Sea, Large and Love). Montgomery wrote both the screenplay and score of Raising the Wind (1961), and his other film scores included The Kidnappers (1953), Raising a Riot (1955), Eyewitness (1956), The Truth About Women (1957), The Surgeon's Knife (1957), Please Turn Over (1959), Too Young to Love (1959), Watch Your Stern (1960), No Kidding (1960), Twice Round the Daffodils (1962) and The Brides of Fu Manchu (1966).

== Detective novels ==
Montgomery wrote detective novels and two collections of short stories under the pseudonym Edmund Crispin (taken from a character in Michael Innes's Hamlet, Revenge!). Nine volumes appeared between 1944 and 1953, starting with The Case of The Gilded Fly. The stories feature Oxford don Gervase Fen, who is a professor of English at the university and a fellow of St Christopher's College, a fictional institution that Crispin locates next to St John's College. Fen is an eccentric, sometimes absent-minded, character reportedly based on his tutor, the Oxford professor W. G. Moore (1905-1978).

All of the novels contain frequent references to English literature, poetry, and (in particular) music. Frequent Hearses and Swan Song have a specifically musical backdrop. Swan Song (1947) explores the world of opera during rehearsals for a production of Wagner's Die Meistersinger von Nürnberg, while Frequent Hearses is set in a film studio, and includes among the characters Napier, a composer of film music. By 1950, when Frequent Hearses was published, Montgomery was already busy elsewhere, also establishing himself as a composer of film music.

Crispin is considered by many to be one of the last great exponents of the classic crime mystery. He was inducted into the prestigious Detection Club in 1947.

== Composer ==
Bruce Montgomery composed the scores for nearly forty films, including documentaries and thrillers. The Carry-On Suite, arranged by David Whittle from the scores of Carry On Sergeant (1958), Carry On Nurse (1959) and Carry On Teacher (1959), provides a representative example, dominated by the main theme, a comedy March. For Raising the Wind (1961), Montgomery was responsible for the storyline, screenplay and musical score, also conducting the music and acting as technical advisor.

Although his film work got his music out to a huge audience, the numerous comedy scores in particular stand in stark contrast to Bruce Montgomery's concert works and church music with which he started out. These began to appear in the mid-1940s, at the same time his detective novels were appearing under the name Edmund Crispin. An early example is the Overture to a Fairy Tale of 1946, first performed in February 1948 by the Torquay Municipal Orchestra. (Montgomery was living at Brixham at the time).

But church music predominates, the culmination being the Oxford Requiem, commissioned by the Oxford Bach Choir and first performed at the Sheldonian Theatre on 23 May 1951 (The Sheldonian was also the scene of a crime in his novel The Moving Toyshop). He may have been motivated to compose the piece following the death of his close friend and teacher, the organist and composer Godfrey Sampson – thought also to have been the inspiration behind the character Geoffrey Vintner, the organist and friend of Gervase Fen in Holy Disorders. An Oxford Requiem "is Montgomery’s most considerable achievement to date", wrote The Times reviewer, "and confirms the suspicion that he is a real composer with something of real significance to say". The choir of St John's College, Oxford has recorded the final movement, 'Lord, thou hast been our refuge'. The Requiem was followed by his final major work for chorus, the secular Venus' Praise (1952), a setting of seven sixteenth and seventeenth century English poems.

Even less known are the operas, which include a children's ballad opera, John Barleycorn, and two intriguing collaborations with his friend Kingsley Amis providing the texts. The first, Amberley Hall, was described by Montgomery as "a mildly scandalous burlesque set in England in the 18th century". The second, To Move the Passions, was a ballad opera commissioned for the 1951 Festival of Britain. Both remained unfinished, and Amis complained that Montgomery was too busy "writing filthy film scores and stinking stories for the popular press".

Of the orchestral concert works, only Overture to a Fairy Tale and the Concertino for String Orchestra of 1950 – a substantial three movement piece despite the modest title, and the only purely instrumental work Montgomery ever had published – are generally available as recordings. There are recordings of two concert works derived from film scores: Scottish Aubade (from the 1952 documentary film Scottish Highlands) and Scottish Lullaby (from The Kidnappers, 1953). The BBC revived the 1947 comedy overture Bartholomew Fair in June 2024.

Philip Lane calls Montgomery "a composer of talent who was perhaps side-tracked, and, not helped by increasing alcoholism, unable to fulfil his full potential. On the other hand, not every composer has their music heard by millions throughout the world, even though not every listener is aware of the composer’s name."

== Later career ==
Montgomery returned to literature at the end of his life, with the final Crispin novel, The Glimpses of the Moon (1977). By now, the composer character, Broderick Thouless, is writing 'difficult' film music and light concert works rather than the other way round (as it was with Napier in Frequent Hearses). Such comic perversity is characteristic of Crispin.

But Montgomery's output of music and fiction had all but ceased after the 1950s, although he continued to write reviews of crime novels and science fiction works for The Sunday Times (praising the early works of both P. D. James and Ruth Rendell). He had always been a heavy drinker, and there was a long gap in his writing during a time when he was suffering from alcohol problems. Otherwise he enjoyed a quiet life (enlivened by music, reading, church-going and bridge) in Totnes, Devon, where he resisted all attempts to develop or exploit the district, and visited London as little as possible. He moved to a new house he had built at Higher Week, a hamlet near Dartington, in 1964. The 1969 short story We Know You're Busy Writing, But We Thought You Wouldn't Mind If We Just Dropped in for a Minute humorously evokes the difficulties of a writer balancing his social and leisure inclinations with the discipline of writing. In 1976 he married his secretary Ann, two years before he died from alcohol-related problems aged 56.

A biography by David Whittle, Bruce Montgomery/Edmund Crispin: A Life in Music and Books (ISBN 0754634434) was published in June 2007. A previously unpublished novella, featuring Gervase Fen, "The Hours of Darkness," has been included in the 2019 edition of the annual anthology, Bodies from the Library.

== Influence ==
Gareth Roberts has said that the tone of his Doctor Who novel The Well-Mannered War was modelled upon Crispin's style. He also remarks (of The Moving Toyshop): "It's more like Doctor Who than Doctor Who." Christopher Fowler pays homage to The Moving Toyshop in The Victoria Vanishes, his sixth Bryant & May novel.

== Bibliography ==
=== Novels ===
All feature Gervase Fen.

- The Case of the Gilded Fly (1944) (published in the United States as Obsequies at Oxford)
- Holy Disorders (1945)
- The Moving Toyshop (1946)
- Swan Song (1947) (published in the United States as Dead and Dumb)
- Love Lies Bleeding (1948)
- Buried for Pleasure (1948)
- Frequent Hearses (1950) (published in the United States as Sudden Vengeance)
- The Long Divorce (1951) (published in the United States as A Noose for Her)
- The Glimpses of the Moon (1977)

=== Short story collections ===
- Beware of the Trains (1953)
  - 'Beware of the Trains', 'Humbleby Agonistes', 'The Drowning of Edgar Foley', 'Lacrimae Rerum', 'Within the Gates', 'Abhorred Shears', 'The Little Room', 'Express Delivery', 'A Pot of Paint', 'The Quick Brown Fox', 'Black for a Funeral', 'The Name on the Window', 'The Golden Mean', 'Otherwhere', 'The Evidence for the Crown',' Deadlock'
- Fen Country (1979)
  - 'Who Killed Baker?', 'Death and Aunt Fancy', 'The Hunchback Cat', 'The Lion's Tooth', 'Gladstone's Candlestick', 'The Man Who Lost His Head', 'The Two Sisters', 'Outrage in Stepney', 'A Country to Sell', 'A Case in Camera', 'Blood Sport', 'The Pencil', 'Windhover Cottage', 'The House by the River', 'After Evensong', 'Death Behind Bars', 'We Know You're Busy Writing, But We Thought You Wouldn't Mind If We Just Dropped in for a Minute', 'Cash on Delivery', 'Shot in the Dark', 'The Mischief Done', 'Merry-Go-Round', 'Occupational Risk', 'Dog in the Night-Time', 'Man Overboard', 'The Undraped Torso', 'Wolf!'

=== Short stories ===
- 'Deadlock'. Ellery Queen's Mystery Magazine, June 1949. Collected in Beware of the Trains (1953)
- 'Beware of the Trains'. Daily Sketch, December 1949. Collected in Beware of the Trains (1953)
- '"Lacrimae Rerum"'. Daily Sketch, December 1949. Collected in Beware of the Trains (1953)
- 'The Quick Brown Fox'. London Evening Standard, 9 January 1950. Collected in Beware of the Trains (1953)
- 'Who Killed Baker?' London Evening Standard, 30 October 1950. Written with Geoffrey Bush). Collected in Fen Country (1979). Also published as 'Baker Dies', which was Crispin’a original title
- 'Humbleby Agonistes'. London Evening Standard, 16 October 1950. Collected in Beware of the Trains (1953)
- 'Abhorred Shears'. London Evening Standard, 15 November 1950. Collected in Beware of the Trains (1953)
- 'Express Delivery'. London Evening Standard, 19 December 1950. Collected in Beware of the Trains (1953)
- 'A Pot of Paint'. London Evening Standard, 9 May 1951. Collected in Beware of the Trains (1953)
- 'Black for a Funeral'. London Evening Standard, 29 May 1952. Collected in Beware of the Trains (1953)
- 'The Name on the Window'. London Evening Standard, 24 December 1951, as 'A Crime for Christmas'. Collected in Beware of the Trains (1953). Also published as 'Writing on the Pane'
- 'Otherwhere'. Collected in Beware of the Trains (1953)
- 'The Evidence for the Crown'. London Evening Standard, 9 April 1951. Collected in Beware of the Trains (1953)
- 'Within the Gates'. London Evening Standard, 1 March 1952, as 'Within the Gate'. Collected in Beware of the Trains (1953)
- 'Shot in the Dark'. London Evening Standard, 5 April 1952. Collected in Fen Country (1979)
- 'The Drowning of Edgar Foley'. London Evening Standard, 18 August 1952. Collected in Beware of the Trains (1953)
- 'The Golden Mean'. London Evening Standard, 29 July 1952. Collected in Beware of the Trains (1953)
- 'The Little Room'. London Evening Standard, 1 September 1952. Collected in Beware of the Trains (1953)
- 'Merry-Go-Round'. London Evening Standard, 23 February 1953. Collected in Fen Country (1979)
- 'The Pencil'. London Evening Standard, 24 February 1953. Collected in Fen Country (1979)
- 'The House by the River'. London Evening Standard, 25 February 1953. Collected in Fen Country (1979). Also published as 'The Crime by the River'
- 'Death and Aunt Fancy'. London Evening Standard, 26 February 1953. Collected in Fen Country (1979)
- 'Wolf!'. London Evening Standard, 27 February 1953. Collected in Fen Country (1979)
- 'After Evensong'. London Evening Standard, 28 February 1953. Collected in Fen Country (1979)
- 'Windhover Cottage'. London Evening Standard, 2 August 1954. Collected in Fen Country (1979)
- 'Man Overboard'. London Evening Standard, 3 August 1954. Collected in Fen Country (1979). Also published as 'Blackmailers Have Their Uses'
- 'Dog in the Night-Time'. London Evening Standard, 4 August 1954. Collected in Fen Country (1979). Also published as 'Looking for a Diamond'
- 'The Hunchback Cat'. London Evening Standard, 5 August 1954. Collected in Fen Country (1979)
- 'Blood Sport'. London Evening Standard, 6 August 1954. Collected in Fen Country (1979). Also published as 'The Unloaded Gun'
- 'The Undraped Torso'. London Evening Standard, 7 August 1954. Collected in Fen Country (1979). Also published as ‘'The Man Who Was Afraid of Cameras'’. Crispin’a original title was ‘'Undraped Torso'’
- 'Occupational Risk'. London Evening Standard, 11 July 1955, as 'What's His Line?'. Collected in Fen Country (1979).
- 'The Man Who Lost His Head'. London Evening Standard, 8 August 1955. Collected in Fen Country (1979). Also published as 'Head of a Man'
- 'A Country to Sell'. London Evening Standard, 9 August 1955. Collected in Fen Country (1979)
- 'The Lion's Tooth'. London Evening Standard, 10 August 1955. Collected in Fen Country (1979)
- 'A Case in Camera'. London Evening Standard, 11 August 1955. Collected in Fen Country (1979)
- 'Gladstone's Candlestick'. [ondon Evening Standard, 12 August 1955. Collected in Fen Country (1979)
- 'The Two Sisters'. London Evening Standard, 13 August 1955. Collected in Fen Country (1979)
- 'Outrage in Stepney'. Ellery Queen's Mystery Magazine, November 1955. Collected in Fen Country (1979). Also published as 'A Message for Herr Dietrich'
- 'Death behind Bars'. Ellery Queen's Mystery Magazine, September 1960. Collected in Fen Country (1979). Also published as 'Too Clever for Scotland Yard'
- 'We Know You're Busy Writing, But We Thought You Wouldn't Mind If We Just Dropped in for a Minute'. Winter's Crimes 1 (1969). Collected in Fen Country (1979). Also published as 'Danger, Writer at Work'
- 'The Mischief Done'. Winter's Crimes 6 (1972). Collected in Fen Country (1979)
- 'St Bartholomew's Day'. Ellery Queen's Mystery Magazine, February 1975
- 'Cash on Delivery'. First published in Fen Country (1979)
- 'The Hours of Darkness'. First published, Bodies from the Library 2 (Ed. Tony Medawar, 2019)
- 'Child's Play'. First published, Bodies from the Library 4 (Ed. Tony Medawar, 2021)
- 'The Year and the Day'. First published, Bodies from the Library 5 (Ed. Tony Medawar, 2022)

=== Uncollected short stories ===
- "St Bartholomew's Day", First published in edited form in Ellery Queen's Mystery Magazine (February 1975). Reprinted, unedited, Ghosts from the Library, ed. Tony Medawar (Collins Crime Club, 2022)
- "The Hours of Darkness," Bodies from the Library, 2, ed. Tony Medawar (Collins Crime Club, 2019)
- "Child's Play," Bodies from the Library, 4, ed. Tony Medawar (Collins Crime Club, 2021)
- "The Year and the Day," Bodies from the Library, 5, ed. Tony Medawar (Collins Crime Club, 2022)

=== As editor ===
Crispin edited two volumes entitled Best Detective Stories, two entitled Best Tales of Terror and seven entitled Best Science Fiction, which were published during the 1950s and 1960s.

== Compositions ==
=== Film scores ===
- The Brides of Fu Manchu (1966)
- Carry On Cruising (1962)
- Twice Round the Daffodils (1962)
- Raising the Wind (aka Roommates in the US) (1961)
- Carry On Regardless (1961)
- Beware of Children (1960)
- Watch Your Stern (1960)
- Doctor in Love (1960)
- Too Young to Love (1960)
- Carry On Constable (1960)
- Please Turn Over (1959)
- Carry On Teacher (1959)
- Carry On Nurse (1959)
- Home Is the Hero (1959)
- Carry On Sergeant (1958)
- Heart of a Child (1958)
- The Surgeon's Knife (1957)
- The Truth About Women (1957)
- Doctor at Large (1957)
- Checkpoint (1956)
- Circus Friends (1956)
- Eyewitness (1956)
- Keep It Clean (1956)
- Guilty? (1956)
- Escapade (1955)
- Le avventure di Cartouche (English language version)
- Doctor at Sea (1955)
- Raising a Riot (1955)
- Doctor in the House (1954)
- Highland Journey (1953) (Documentary short)
- The Kidnappers (1953)
- A Prince for Cynthia (1953) (Short)
- Which Will Ye Have? (1949) (Short)

=== Concert and church music ===
- Overture to a Fairy Tale (1946)
- Comedy Overture: Bartholomew Fair (1947)
- Concertino for String Orchestra (1950)
- An Oxford Requiem (1951)
- Venus' Praise, for chorus and orchestra (1952)
- Scottish Aubade and Scottish Lullaby (1952-3)
- John Barleycorn three act ballad opera for narrator and chorus (1962), libretto Mary Fairclough
