= Catalina (novel) =

1948 novel by W. Somerset Maugham

- First edition (UK)
- Author: W. Somerset Maugham
- Language: English
- Publisher: Heinemann (UK); Doubleday (US)
- Publication date: 1948
- Publication place: United Kingdom
- Media type: Print (hardback & paperback)
- Pages: 256

Catalina is a novel written by W. Somerset Maugham and first published by Heinemann in 1948. Set in Spain during the Inquisition, the novel is a satire on the power of the church. It was Maugham's last published novel.

== Plot ==
Catalina is a crippled girl, supposedly cured by divine intervention after witnessing a vision of the Virgin Mary. As a result, she is pressured into becoming a nun in a Carmelite convent. The Bishop of Segovia, himself undergoing a crisis of faith, becomes involved in the debate about the debt owed to God by Catalina for her cure. Catalina resists all attempts at control, being determined to marry the man she loves. She joins a troupe of strolling players and becomes the most famous actress in all of Spain.
