= Holy Disorders =

1945 mystery novel by Edmund Crispin

- First Edition Cover
- Author: Edmund Crispin
- Language: English
- Series: Gervase Fen
- Genre: Detective
- Publisher: Gollancz
- Publication date: 1945
- Publication place: United Kingdom
- Media type: Print
- Preceded by: The Case of the Gilded Fly
- Followed by: The Moving Toyshop

Holy Disorders is a 1945 mystery novel by the English writer Edmund Crispin, the second in his series featuring the Oxford professor and amateur detective Gervase Fen. The novel is set during the Second World War. The title is a reference to Chaucer.

== Plot ==
After a violent attack on Denis Brooks, organist in the small cathedral city of Tolnbridge in Devon, Gervase Fen sends a telegram to his composer acquaintance, Geoffrey Vintner, urging him to hurry down to take over his duties. Before he has even left London, Vintner is attacked by an unknown assailant in a department store and has another narrow escape while travelling down on the train from Paddington.

In Tolnbridge, Vintner is put up in the cathedral’s clergy-house, and is introduced to a large group of variously eccentric ‘cathedral people’. Brooks has been in hospital ever since the attack, and that evening his medication is tampered with and he dies from atropine poisoning. It seems that he may have been silenced after seeing something in the cathedral. The police suspect that an enemy spy ring has been transmitting from the cathedral at night, using a portable wireless transmitter. Later that night, while Fen and Vintner are outside the cathedral, they hear a mighty crash. Dr Butler, inside, has been killed by a falling stone slab that marks the entrance to an ancient tomb. Sir John Dallow, the cathedral’s Chancellor, tells Fen and Vintner of 17th century local witch trials. Vintner has fallen in love with Dr Butler’s daughter, Frances, and impetuously asks her to marry him.

Few of the potential suspects have alibis for the murders, and Fen eventually closes in on the culprits by a close consideration of the group’s movements and timings. Fen and Vintner attend a black mass, and are attacked by the masked celebrant. The gang is eventually revealed to include the young curate July Savernake and the landlord of the local pub, Harry James. Their ringleader is Frances Butler, unexpectedly revealed as a Nazi sympathiser and Devil-worshipper. Her motives are not easy to understand, and Sir John Dallow speculates that it may have been in her blood: as a member of a very old local family, the evil of witchcraft may have been passed down to her through the centuries.

== Principal characters ==
- Gervase Fen, amateur investigator
- Geoffrey Vintner, composer and organist
- Henry Fielding, former shop assistant and aspiring investigator
- Denis Brooks, cathedral organist
- Dr Butler, Precentor
- Frances Butler, elder daughter of Dr Butler
- Josephine Butler, younger daughter of Dr Butler
- Dr Garbin, cathedral Canon
- Dr Spitshuker, cathedral Canon
- Dutton, deputy organist
- Sir John Dallow, Chancellor and expert in witchcraft
- July Savernake, young curate
- Justinian Peace, psycho-analyst, Dr Butler’s brother in law
- Harry James, landlord of local pub
- Police Inspector Garratt

== See also ==
- Golden Age of Detective Fiction

== Bibliography ==
- Ellis, Steve. Chaucer at Large: The Poet in the Modern Imagination. University of Minnesota Press, 2000.
- Hubin, Allen J. Crime Fiction, 1749-1980: A Comprehensive Bibliography. Garland Publishing, 1984.
- Reilly, John M. Twentieth Century Crime & Mystery Writers. Springer, 2015.
