= Suzanne Robert =

Canadian writer

Suzanne Robert (1948 – June 3, 2007) was a Quebec writer.

She was born in Montreal and received a BA from the Collège Jésus-Marie d'Outremont and a master's degree in biological anthropology from the Université de Montréal. From 1984 to 1999, she was a member of the management committee for the magazine Liberté. Robert was also literary commentator for Radio Canada for a number of years. She was director for the "Fictions" collection of the Éditions de l'Hexagone publishing house. Her short stories were also included in various anthologies.

== Works ==
- La dame morte (1973)
- Les trois soeurs de personne, novel (1980)
- Vulpera (1983), shortlisted for the Governor General's Award for French-language fiction
- À proximité, stories (1987)
- L'Autre, l'une (1987), with Diane-Monique Daviau
