= Elephant Walk (novel) =

1948 novel

- First edition (UK)
- Author: Robert Standish
- Language: English
- Genre: Drama
- Publisher: Peter Davies (UK); Macmillan (US)
- Publication date: 1948
- Publication place: United Kingdom
- Media type: Print

Elephant Walk is a 1948 novel by Robert Standish, a pen name of the British writer Digby George Gerahty. It is set on a tea plantation in the British colony of Ceylon.

== Film adaptation ==
It was the basis of the 1954 Hollywood film Elephant Walk directed by William Dieterle and starring Elizabeth Taylor and Dana Andrews and Peter Finch.

== Bibliography ==
- Goble, Alan. The Complete Index to Literary Sources in Film. Walter de Gruyter, 1999.
