= Digby George Gerahty =

English writer

Digby George Gerahty (3 April 1898 – 6 November 1981), who wrote mostly under the pen-names of Robert Standish and Stephen Lister, was an English novelist and short story writer most productive during the 1940s and 1950s. He was also a featured contributor to the Saturday Evening Post. His novels include Elephant Walk, which was later made into a film starring Elizabeth Taylor.

In the semi-autobiographical Marise (1950), Gerahty (writing as "Stephen Lister") claimed that he and two publicist colleagues had covertly "invented" the Loch Ness Monster in 1933 as part of a contract to improve business for local hotels; he repeated his claim to Henry H. Bauer, a researcher, in 1980.

== Biography ==
Gerahty was born in 1898 in Isleworth, the son of George and Laura. He was the elder brother of the actor Leslie Marsh Gerahty (better known as Garry Marsh) and the younger brother of the journalist Cecil Gerahty.

Upon leaving school, Gerahty went to India to work the tea plantations. He joined the Royal Air Force on 7 July 1917 and served until 15 February 1919, leaving with a temporary commission as 2nd lieutenant.

After World War I, Gerahty worked as Reuters correspondent in Japan, followed by periods in China and Siberia. At various points of his life, he lived in or travelled through Malaya, the Dutch East Indies, Australia and New Zealand.

Gerahty had claimed credit for concocting the Loch Ness Monster. In his book Marise, which he published in 1950 under the name Stephen Lister, he wrote that the Loch Ness Monster was "invented for a fee of £150 by an ingenious publicity man". During a discussion with Henry H. Bauer in 1980, Gerahty said that he was the ingenious publicity man in question and had developed the idea in 1933 after being solicited by some hotel owners to bolster tourism in Lossiemouth so that the industry would recover from The Great Depression. Gerahty told Bauer that he successfully arranged for the Loch Ness Monster to be sighted, saying that "the story snowballed" from there. Gerahty's claims were never corroborated.

== Personal life ==
He was first married in 1934 with a second marriage to Ethyle R D Campbell in 1938, Paddington.

Gerahty died at his home in Valbonne, Provence-Alpes-Côte d'Azur, in the South of France, aged 83.

== Works ==
- Goose Feathers (1938, George Digby)
- Down Wind (1939, George Digby)
- Red Horizons (1939, George Digby) (published in the United States as Under the Redwood Trees, 1940)
- Savoy Grill at One! (1939, Lister)
- Consider the Lilies (1941, Lister)
- Sunset Over France (1942, Lister)
- The Three Bamboos (1942, Standish)
- Bonin (1943, Standish)
- The Marionette (1943, George Echlin)
- Softly Softly Catvchee Monkey (1943, Lister)
- By the Waters of Babylon (1945, Lister)
- Eight Oaks (1945, Lister)
- The Small General (1945, Standish)
- Mr. On Loong (1947, Standish)
- Peace Comes to Sainte Monique (1947, Lister)
- Elephant Walk (1948, Standish)
- Hail Bolognia! (1948, Lister)
- The Gulf of Time (1948, Standish)
- Sun and Heir (1949, Lister)
- Gentleman of China (1949, Standish)
- Follow the Seventh Man (1950, Standish)
- Marise (1950, Lister)
- Storm Centre (1951, Standish)
- The Sky is Blue (1951, Lister)
- A Worthy Man (1952, Standish)
- Miss Sainte Monique (1953, Lister)
- Fit for a Bishop; or, How to Keep a Fat Priest in Prime Condition (Recipes) (1953, 1955, Lister)
- A Long Way from Pimlico (1954, Standish) (published in the United States as Escape from Pimlico)
- Private Enterprise (1954, Standish) (short stories)
- Face Value (1955, Standish) (short stories)
- Blind Tiger (1956, Standish)
- Honourable Ancestor (1956. Standish)
- Everything Smelt of Kippers (1957, Lister)
- Storm Centre (1957)
- The Prince of Storytellers: The Life of E. Phillips Oppenheim (1957, Standish)
- African Guinea Pig (1958, Standish)
- Delorme in Deep Water (1958, Lister)
- The Radio-Active General and Other Stories (1959, Standish)
- In Search of Paradise (1960, Lister)
- The Big One Got Away (1960, Standish)
- The First of Trees: The Story of The Olive (1960, Standish)
- The Talking Dog: and Other Stories (1961, Standish)
- The Cruise of the Three Brothers (1962, Standish)
- Singapore Kate (1964, Standish)
- Hot Chestnuts and Other Stories (1964, Standish)
- End of The Line (1965, Standish)
- More Fit for a Bishop (1965, Lister)
- The Widow Hack (1966, Standish)
- Sainte Monique Roundabout (1967, Lister)
- Sainte Monique Unlimited (1968, Lister)
- The Course of True Love (1968, Standish)
- Broom (1969, Lister)
- Elephant Law, and Other Stories (1969, Standish)
- Empty Valley (1970, Lister)
- Rickshaw Boy (1970, Standish)
- Hungarian Roulette (1972, Lister)
- The Silk Tontine (1972, Standish)
- The Fountain of Youth, and Other Stories (1973, Standish)
- Tycoon in Eden (1973, Lister)
- Smell of Brimstone (1974, Lister)
- The Short Match (1974, Standish)
- Dabney's Reef (1975, Standish)
- The Dog That Never Was (1975, Lister)
- Green Fire (1976, Standish)
- Becky (1976, Lister)
- The Story of Mary Lee (1978, Standish)
- Abominable Goat (1977, Lister)
- Autumn Cuckoo (1977, Standish)
