= The Count of Saint Germain =

1948 novel by Alexander Lernet-Holenia

- First edition
- Author: Alexander Lernet-Holenia
- Language: German
- Genre: Drama
- Publisher: Consett & Huber
- Publication date: 1948
- Publication place: Austria
- Media type: Print

The Count of Saint Germain (German: Der Graf von Saint Germain) is a 1948 novel by the Austrian writer Alexander Lernet-Holenia. It regained the author's pre-war popularity and dealt with the issues of the Anschluss and war guilt.

== Bibliography ==
- Robert von Dassanowsky. Austrian Cinema: A History. McFarland, 2005.
