= The Plank (1967 film) =

1967 British film by Eric Sykes

- Directed by: Eric Sykes
- Written by: Eric Sykes
- Produced by: Jon Penington
- Starring: Eric Sykes; Tommy Cooper; Jimmy Edwards
- Cinematography: Arthur Wooster
- Edited by: John Pomeroy
- Music by: Brian Fahey
- Distributed by: Rank Film Distributors (UK)
- Release date: 1967
- Running time: 51 or 44 minutes
- Country: United Kingdom
- Language: English

The Plank is a 1967 British slapstick comedy film directed and written by Eric Sykes, and starring Sykes, Tommy Cooper and Jimmy Edwards, and featuring many of the top British comedians and comic actors of the time. It was produced by Jon Penington for Associated London Films.

It follows the misadventures of two builders who require a floorboard. The story was based on the 1964 episode "Sykes and a Plank" of Eric Sykes' BBC comedy series Sykes and a... . Although not strictly a silent film, it has little dialogue; instead, the film is punctuated by grunts, other vocal noises and sound effects.

== Plot ==
After one of the characters uses the last floorboard for heating, the two hapless carpenters have to buy a replacement. They return to the house with the plank on top of a Morris Eight Series E, but the journey is fraught with unexpected difficulties.

The film is a series of "plank jokes" elaborating on the "man with a plank" slapstick routine seen in vaudeville and silent films, and adding new ones. For instance, at one point the plank is tied to the top of the car and projects backward into the open back of a large van. A man (played by Roy Castle) enters the back of the van and sits down. The van drives away, leaving him suspended in mid-air sitting on the end of the plank.

== Cast ==
- The Plank as itself
- Eric Sykes as the smaller workman
- Tommy Cooper as the larger workman
- Dermot Kelly as the milkman
- Hattie Jacques as the woman with the rose
- Roy Castle as the delivery man (smelly man)
- Jimmy Edwards as the policeman
- Kenny Lynch as the dustbin lorry driver
- Jim Dale as the house painter
- Barney Gilbraith as the paint-covered house owner
- Rex Garner as the tourist
- Libby Morris as the tourist's wife
- Anna Carteret as the 'It's Paint' woman
- Johnny Speight as the pipe smoker in bus queue
- Joan Young as the woman in bus queue with fur coat
- Dennis Golding as the boy with cuffed ear
- Hyma Beckley as man in bus queue (uncredited)
- Howard Douglas as the old man
- Tricia De Dulin as the young lady helped across the road
- Thomas Gallagher as the man with beer
- Bill Oddie as the window cleaner
- Jimmy Tarbuck as the barman
- Ronnie Brody as the nude model carrier
- Clovissa Newcombe as the girl in the van
- Graham Stark as the amorous van driver
- Ian Wilson as the van driver's mate
- John Junkin as the lorry driver with the eye patch
- Dave Freeman as the UDC cement layer
- Stratford Johns as the station sergeant
- Oh... and The Cat

== Production ==
Two variants exist, running for about 51 and 44 minutes respectively. The film was reissued in 1974, with some scenes cut down or extended, and some put in a different order, with the music reapplied to suit; some voices were clarified.

Although a single plank was depicted throughout the film, two planks were actually used for filming: a thin plank for scenes where actors carry the plank, and a thicker plank for scenes where it is being transported on the Morris Eight and for scenes where a thicker stronger plank was required. In December 2011, one of these planks from the film was sold at auction for £1,050.

Dermot Kelly is often listed as "Concertina Man" or "Affluent Concertina Man", instead of "Milkman". Johnny Speight is often listed as "Chauffeur", "Concertina Man's Chauffeur" or "Concertina Man's Father", instead of "Pipe Smoker in Bus Queue".

== Critical reception ==
The Monthly Film Bulletin wrote: "Eric Sykes describes this film, in which he deliberately attempts to create an internationally accessible form of comedy by keeping dialogue to a bare minimum and concentrating on visual effects, as "an exposition of the mechanical gag". But the mechanical gag as he employs it here (the plank carried on a workman's shoulder which bangs the head of an adjacent bystander, the absent-minded house-painter who paints both the doorway and the man standing in it) is a form already brilliantly exposed and explored in the early silent comedies for which Sykes has such an obvious affection. And neither the use of Technicolor nor the occasional new gimmick – the liturgical incantation of the credit titles, for instance – is enough to conceal either the poverty or the superfluousness of the improvised dialogue, or more seriously, to disguise the fact that Sykes has stretched fifteen minutes of slapstick material into a fifty-four minute film. The result is something genial and leisurely – like Laurel and Hardy in waltz time – in which familiar TV comedians move through familiar routines, generating constant goodwill but only intermittent laughter."

The Radio Times Guide to Films gave the film 3/5 stars, writing: "This joyously inventive 'silent' comedy from writer/director Eric Sykes is about the misadventures of two builders delivering wood to a house. Sykes himself is "Smaller workman" to Tommy Cooper's "Larger workman", and, although not all the jokes are completely fresh, the fun is in the effective sound effects, and the spotting of comedy icons such as Jimmy Edwards, Jimmy Tarbuck and Roy Castle in unfamiliar poses. Music hall on the hoof."

== See also ==
- The Plank (1979 film) — a television remake of this film
- Other Eric Sykes short films in a similar style to The Plank:
  - Rhubarb (1969)
  - Rhubarb Rhubarb (1980, a television remake of Rhubarb)
  - It's Your Move (1982)
  - Mr. H Is Late (1988)
  - The Big Freeze (1993)
