= April Walker =

British actress (born 1943)

- Born: April Walker; 1943 (age 82–83); Sherborne, Dorset, England
- Education: Royal Academy of Dramatic Art
- Occupation: Actress
- Years active: 1962-2009

April Walker (born 1943) is a retired English actress.

== Early life ==
Walker was born in 1943 in Sherborne, Dorset. She trained at the Royal Academy of Dramatic Art between 1960 and 1962. One of the first repertory companies she joined after RADA was the Theatre Royal, Lincoln. She was notable for her performance in 'Oh what a lovely war'. Even designing her own costume for the production to the delight of the dedicated audience.

== Career ==
Walker worked extensively in repertory and touring theatre before appearing on television in BBC TV comedy series such as The Two Ronnies, Fawlty Towers (as Jean Wilson, in an early episode in which a hotel proprietor, Basil Fawlty, played by John Cleese, seeks to stamp out suspected extra-marital liaisons on his premises), Yes Minister (as a journalist, who discovers that a Government Minister, whose wife is a friend of hers, has retained for himself a valuable vase presented during an overseas visit), Dad's Army (as a Second World War “land girl”), Morecambe and Wise, The Dick Emery Show, Terry and June, Sykes, and The Les Dawson Show.

Interspersed with the comedy were drama series which included appearances in Inspector Wycliffe, Anna Karenina, Minor Complications, Father Brown, The Prince and the Pauper, Judge John Deed and Waking The Dead. She has also performed on radio, including the last series of The Navy Lark, and in films such as The Pink Panther Strikes Again, Rhubarb Rhubarb and Shadow in a Landscape.

Walker's experience of touring took her to Canada and South Africa in 1979, with Eric Sykes and Hattie Jacques, and to the Middle East and Far East in 1990 with Tim Brooke Taylor in a Derek Nimmo production of Alan Ayckbourn's Table Manners. She has appeared in West End productions: Oh Clarence at the Lyric Theatre in 1968 (in which she played Jon Pertwee's niece), in Key For Two at the Vaudeville in 1982, Present Laughter at both the Aldwych Theatre and the Wyndham Theatre in 1996, and Brief Encounter at the Lyric Theatre in 2000.

== Doctor Who audition ==
In 1973, a new companion was being sought to star opposite Jon Pertwee in the long-running television series Doctor Who. After auditioning many women, producer Barry Letts selected Walker for the role of Sarah Jane Smith. Pertwee, who had been playing the Doctor for some time, had not been consulted and totally disagreed with the casting, although he and Walker had worked harmoniously together in Oh Clarence. He was not comfortable with playing opposite his female co-star, who was tall and blonde. Already contractually protected, Walker was paid for the entire season but any monies earned at the BBC during the period of the contract were deducted. The role was re-cast with Elisabeth Sladen, who was not as tall as Walker and had dark hair.

Although committed to not talking about the issue in her release agreement, Walker began to discuss the circumstances surrounding her casting decades later. After giving some written interviews to fanzines, in May 2020 Walker gave an on-screen interview to 'Time Space Visualiser' giving much further detail about the circumstances, including revealing later work alongside Pertwee in the last series of radio comedy The Navy Lark. Walker stated that they "were perfectly civil to each other, but I could never quite forgive him".
