= Rhubarb rhubarb =

Rhubarb rhubarb could refer to:

- Rhubarb Rhubarb, a 1980 British comedy film starring Eric Sykes
- Rhubarb (sound effect), the filmmaking term for background crowd speech
