= The Plank (1979 film) =

1979 film by Eric Sykes

- Directed by: Eric Sykes
- Written by: Eric Sykes
- Produced by: Dennis Kirkland
- Starring: Eric Sykes; Arthur Lowe
- Edited by: John Plummer
- Music by: Alan Braden
- Release date: 1979
- Running time: 27 minutes
- Country: United Kingdom
- Language: English

The Plank is a 30-minute, British slapstick comedy film for television from 1979, which was written and directed by Eric Sykes. This version, which is a remake of the 1967 film The Plank, also written and directed by Sykes, was produced by Thames Television and broadcast on the ITV network.

Although not literally a silent film, it has little spoken dialogue. Instead the film is punctuated by grunts, other vocal noises and sound effects. The soundtrack was composed by Alan Braden, and performed by Alan Braden and his orchestra.

Sveriges Television in Sweden used to show the film several times around Christmas and New Year during the 1980s and 1990s.

== Outline ==
When two builders find that a floorboard is missing, they buy a replacement floorboard and return with it through the streets, causing unexpected chaos.

This was the third version of The Plank; the basic idea had originated in an episode called "Sykes and a Plank", which Eric Sykes had written for his BBC television comedy series, Sykes and a... in 1964. This 1979 television version won the prize at the 1980 Festival Rose d'Or, held in Montreux, Switzerland.

== Cast ==
- Eric Sykes as the Larger Workman (played by Tommy Cooper in original)
- Arthur Lowe as the Smaller Workman (played by Eric Sykes in original)
- Deryck Guyler as the Milkman (played by Dermot Kelly in original)
- Robert Dorning as the Fork-Lift Truck Driver
- Diana Dors as the Woman with the Rose (played by Hattie Jacques in original)
- Brian Murphy as the Van Driver in the Timber Yard
- Charlie Drake as the Delivery Man (played by Roy Castle in original)
- Jimmy Edwards as the Policeman (played same character (but now promoted) in original)
- Kenny Lynch as a Dustman (played the dustbin lorry driver in original)
- Pat Gorman as a Dustman (uncredited)
- Frankie Howerd as the Tourist (played by Rex Garner in original)
- Ann Sidney as the Tourist's Wife (played by Libby Morris in original)
- Kate O'Mara as the 'It's Paint' Woman (played by Anna Carteret in original)
- Bernard Cribbins as the House Painter (played by Jim Dale in original)
- Lionel Blair as the Paint-covered House Owner (played by Barney Gilbraith in original)
- Wilfrid Hyde-White as the Old Man (played by Howard Douglas in original)
- Liza Goddard as the Young Lady Helped Across the Road (played by Tricia De Dulin in original)
- Henry Cooper as the Man with Beer (played by Thomas Gallagher in original)
- Reg Varney as the Window Cleaner (played by Bill Oddie in original)
- Joanna Lumley as the Girl in the Van (played by Clovissa Newcombe in original)
- Harry H. Corbett as the Amorous Van Driver (played by Graham Stark in original)
- Charles Hawtrey as the Van Driver's Mate (played by Ian Wilson in original)
- James Hunt as the Lorry Driver with the Eye Patch (played by John Junkin in original)
- Frank Windsor as a Car Occupant at Holdup
