= Rhubarb (1969 film) =

1969 British short comedy film by Eric Sykes

- Directed by: Eric Sykes
- Written by: Eric Sykes
- Produced by: Jon Penington
- Starring: Harry Secombe; Eric Sykes; Jimmy Edwards
- Cinematography: Arthur Wooster
- Edited by: Anthony B. Sloman
- Music by: Brian Fahey
- Production company: Avalon Productions Ltd
- Distributed by: Warner-Pathé (UK)
- Release date: 1969
- Running time: 37 minutes
- Country: United Kingdom
- Language: English

Rhubarb is a 1969 British short film written and directed by Eric Sykes, starring Sykes, Harry Secombe and Jimmy Edwards. The dialogue consists entirely of repetitions of the word "rhubarb", all the characters' last names are "Rhubarb", the vehicle number plates are "RHU BAR B", and a baby "speaks" by holding a sign with the word "rhubarb" written on it. Sykes remade the film in 1980 as Rhubarb, Rhubarb for Thames Television.

In radio, "rhubarb" is an idiom for unintelligible background speech. Typically extras would mutter the word over and over to provide ambience for a crowd or party scene.

== Plot ==
A police inspector and a vicar play a round of golf. The inspector has a constable help him to cheat by removing his golf ball from awkward situations, and the vicar ultimately requests divine intervention.

== Cast ==
- Harry Secombe as Vicar Rhubarb
- Eric Sykes as Police Inspector Rhubarb
- Jimmy Edwards as Police Constable Rhubarb
- Kenneth Connor as Mr Rhubarb
- Ann Lancaster as Mrs Rhubarb
- Hattie Jacques as Nurse Rhubarb
- Anastasia Penington as Baby Rhubarb
- Graham Stark as Golfer Rhubarb
- Sheree Winton as Lady Pupil Rhubarb
- Gordon Rollings as Artist Rhubarb
- Johnny Speight as Gents Rhubarb

== Critical reception ==
Monthly Film Bulletin said "It would be nice to be able to applaud this independent British comedy – especially as it tries to revive something of the old Goon Show flavour – but unhappily it fails through over-emphasis and a general paucity of invention. Apart from a would-be comic music score, it is played silent except for the word "rhubarb" which is muttered or shouted by all the characters when some sort of communication is necessary. Although quite amusing at first (as Harry Seacombe's vicar conducts his service), the device wears extremely thin when constantly repeated. Eric Sykes also allows himself and the rest of the cast a degree of exaggeration in their playing which might have worked if the film had a real comic style. As it is, the basic idea of the golf match with craftily cheating players has been used to better effect in earlier comedies, and in any case W. C. Fields has probably had the last word."

Leslie Halliwell said: "Virtually silent comedy (nobody says anything but "rhubarb") which could have been very funny with better jokes. A TV remake in 1979 was however much worse."

Allmovie wrote, "sight gags and pantomime dominate this engaging 37 minute feature."

== See also ==
- "Rhubarb", a song from the MC 900 Ft. Jesus album One Step Ahead of the Spider (1994) is a dialogue over ambient music where this film and its director are directly discussed.
