= It's Your Move (1982 film) =

1982 British short film by Eric Sykes

It's Your Move is the title of two short films written and directed by Eric Sykes (in 1969 and 1982 respectively). The story of both films involves a married couple moving into a new home and enduring the ineptitude of removal men. As with most other films directed by Sykes, the action unfolds in a style echoing the silent, slapstick comedy era.

== Synopsis ==
A young married couple unwisely entrust an inept removals team with their move into a new home.

== Cast ==
- Richard Briers as the husband
- Eric Sykes as head removal man
- Tommy Cooper as big removal man
- Bernard Cribbins as neighbour
- Jimmy Edwards as policeman
- Irene Handl as grand old lady
- Brian Murphy as chauffeur
- Noel Murphy as bearded removal man
- Andrew Sachs as roadsweeper
- Sylvia Syms as the wife
- Bob Todd as old removal man
- Johnny Vyvyan as little removal man
