= Sykes and a Big, Big Show =

1971 British TV sitcom/sketch show

- Genre: Sitcom/Sketch show
- Starring: Eric Sykes; Hattie Jacques; Ian Wallace
- Country of origin: United Kingdom
- Original language: English
- No. of episodes: 6

Production
- Running time: 30 minutes

Original release
- Network: BBC 1
- Release: 26 February – 2 April 1971

Sykes and a Big, Big Show is a British sitcom-sketch show first aired on BBC 1 in 1971. Starring Eric Sykes and Hattie Jacques, it was written by Sykes and directed by Harold Snoad and Douglas Argent. Sykes and Jacques had previously starred together in Sykes and a... (1960–65) and from 1972 to 1979 starred in Sykes.

== Cast ==
- Eric Sykes – various roles
- Hattie Jacques – various roles
- Ian Wallace – various roles
- Philip Gilbert – various roles
- Tony Melody – various roles
- Michael Knowles – various roles

== Plot ==
Sykes and a Big, Big Show features situation sketches and musical numbers, performed by the singer Ian Wallace.

== Episodes ==
1. "Shipwreck" (26 February 1971)
2. "Concorde" (5 March 1971)
3. "Guest" (12 March 1971)
4. "Submarine" (19 March 1971)
5. "Western" (26 March 1971)
6. "Britain's First Moon Shot" (2 April 1971)

== Missing episodes ==
Out of the six episodes, 3 episodes have been lost, the first 'Shipwreck' still exists as a b/w telerecording. The second 'Concorde' exists as a VHS copy held by the BFI (the BBC also hold a digital copy) and the third episode 'Guest' still exists on original 625 line PAL colour videotape.
