= Sykes and a... =

British TV sitcom (1960–1965)

- VHS cover
- Genre: Sitcom
- Starring: Eric Sykes; Hattie Jacques; Richard Wattis
- Country of origin: United Kingdom
- Original language: English
- No. of episodes: 59 + 1 short

Production
- Producers: Dennis Main Wilson (1960-62); Sydney Lotterby (1963-65)
- Running time: 35×25 minutes; 24×30 minutes

Original release
- Network: BBC/BBC1
- Release: 29 January 1960 – 16 November 1965

Related
- Sykes

Sykes and a... is a black-and-white British sitcom starring Eric Sykes and Hattie Jacques that aired on BBC1 from 1960 to 1965. It was written by Eric Sykes, Johnny Speight, John Antrobus and Spike Milligan. Sykes and a... was the first television series to feature both Sykes and Jacques, who later starred in Sykes and a Big, Big Show and Sykes, the latter of which featured the same characters and reused some of the same scripts.

== Cast ==
- Eric Sykes - Himself
- Hattie Jacques - Hattie Sykes
- Deryck Guyler - PC Wilfred "Corky" Turnbull
- Richard Wattis - Charles Brown (series 1 to 3)

== Plot ==
Eric is an accident-prone childlike man who lives with his twin sister Hattie in a terraced house, 24 Sebastopol Terrace, in East Acton. Both are unmarried. Their busybody neighbour Charles Brown often interferes, until he emigrates to Australia. The local policeman, who makes occasional appearances, is Corky Turnbull.

== Episodes ==
Out of the 59 episodes, 32 have been lost, as well as the 1962 short episode featured in Christmas Night with the Stars.

=== Series One (1960) ===
1. "Sykes and a Telephone" (29 January 1960)
2. "Sykes and a Burglary" (5 February 1960)
3. "Sykes and a New Car" (12 February 1960)
4. "Sykes and an Uncle" (19 February 1960)
5. "Sykes and a Lodger" (26 February 1960)

The entire series is missing from the BBC Archives.

=== Series Two (1960) ===
1. "Sykes and a Movie Camera" (11 August 1960)
2. "Sykes and a Library Book" (18 August 1960)
3. "Sykes and a Holiday" (25 August 1960)
4. "Sykes and an Egg" (1 September 1960)
5. "Sykes and a Brave Deed" (8 September 1960)
6. "Sykes and a Cheque Book" (15 September 1960)

Only "Sykes and a Holiday" still exists in the BBC Archives. In 2021 it was confirmed "Sykes and a Movie Camera" existed in the CBC archive in Canada, making it the earliest episode known to exist. The rest of this series is missing.

=== Series Three (1961) ===
1. "Sykes and a Window" (4 January 1961)
2. "Sykes and a Salesman" (11 January 1961)
3. "Sykes and a Fancy Dress" (18 January 1961)
4. "Sykes and a Bath" (25 January 1961)
5. "Sykes and a Marriage" (1 February 1961)
6. "Sykes and an Ankle" (8 February 1961)

Episodes 1 and 3 are missing from the BBC Archives. Episode 5 was previously missing from the archives; however it was recovered in 2023 as a result of the 'Film is Fabulous' event.

=== Series Four (1961) ===
1. "Sykes and a Mission" (14 April 1961)
2. "Sykes and a Stranger" (21 April 1961)
3. "Sykes and a Cat" (28 April 1961)
4. "Sykes and a Bandage" (5 May 1961)
5. "Sykes and a Suspicion" (12 May 1961)
6. "Sykes and a Surprise" (19 May 1961)

Episodes 1, 4, 5 and 6 are missing from the BBC Archives.

=== Series Five (1962) ===
1. "Sykes and a Gamble" (30 January 1962)
2. "Sykes and a Job" (6 February 1962)
3. "Sykes and a Boat" (13 February 1962)
4. "Sykes and a Journey" (20 February 1962)
5. "Sykes and an Elephant" (27 February 1962)
6. "Sykes and a Rolls" (6 March 1962)
7. "Sykes and a Haunting" (13 March 1962)
8. "Sykes and a Dream" (20 March 1962)

All the episodes of this series still exist in the BBC Archives.

=== Short Special (1962) ===
- "Sykes and his Sister" (part of Christmas Night with the Stars; 25 December 1962). This edition of Christmas Night with the Stars also included shorts from Steptoe and Son and The Rag Trade (missing).

=== Series Six (1963) ===
1. "Sykes and a Fog" (21 February 1963)
2. "Sykes and a Phobia" (28 February 1963)
3. "Sykes and a Camping Trip" (7 March 1963)
4. "Sykes and a Picture" (14 March 1963)
5. "Sykes and a Mouse" (21 March 1963)
6. "Sykes and a Walk" (28 March 1963)
7. "Sykes and a Referee" (4 April 1963)
8. "Sykes and a Pub" (11 April 1963)

Episodes 1, 2, 3, 5, 7 and 8 are missing from the BBC Archives.

=== Series Seven (1964) ===
1. "Sykes and a Box" (25 February 1964)
2. "Sykes and a Plank" (3 March 1964). This episode was later adapted into a short film in 1967 and 1979.
3. "Sykes and a Search" (10 March 1964)
4. "Sykes and a Following" (17 March 1964)
5. "Sykes and a Menace" (24 March 1964)
6. "Sykes and a Log Cabin" (31 March 1964)
7. "Sykes and a Band" (7 April 1964)

Episodes 3, 5 and 7 are missing from the BBC Archives.

=== Series Eight (1964) ===
1. "Sykes and Two Birthdays" (30 October 1964)
2. "Sykes and a Hypnotist" (6 November 1964)
3. "Sykes and a Protest" (13 November 1964)
4. "Sykes and a Bird" (20 November 1964)
5. "Sykes and a Cold War" (27 November 1964)
6. "Sykes and a Cold" (4 December 1964)

Episodes 1, 3 and 4 are missing from the BBC Archives.

=== Series Nine (1965) ===
1. "Sykes and a Mountain" (5 October 1965)
2. "Sykes and a Deb" (12 October 1965)
3. "Sykes and a Business" (19 October 1965)
4. "Sykes and a Golfer" (26 October 1965)
5. "Sykes and a Big Brother" (2 November 1965)
6. "Sykes and a Uniform" (9 November 1965)
7. "Sykes and a Nest Egg" (16 November 1965)

Episodes 1, 2, 3, 5 and 7 are missing from the BBC Archives.
