= If You Go Down in the Woods Today =

- Written by: Eric Sykes
- Directed by: Eric Sykes
- Starring: Eric Sykes; Robin Bailey; Norman Bird; Glyn Houston; Roy Kinnear; Fulton Mackay; Marc Sinden; Lee Montague; George Sewell; Tony Selby; Anna Dawson
- Music by: Denis King
- Country of origin: United Kingdom
- Original language: English

Production
- Producers: David Clark; Philip Jones
- Cinematography: Ted Adcock
- Running time: 78 minutes

Original release
- Release: 9 April 1981

If You Go Down in the Woods Today is a British TV film comedy released in 1981, written, directed and starring Eric Sykes, also featuring Fulton Mackay and Roy Kinnear amongst a cast of dozens. The film, produced by Thames TV, was described by Sykes as 'a comedy thriller, an Agatha Christie gone mad!'.

== Plot ==
A Boy Scout troop led by their scoutmaster (Sykes) is on a field trip to a seemingly-peaceful English woodland. However, the woods are actually teeming with strange characters, some of whom turn out to be disguised police officers and others criminals. The police are searching for £2,000,000 in stolen banknotes and hope that the criminals will lead them to them. The criminals, on the other hand, are aware that the police are looking for them and doing their best to avoid betraying the location of their stash. It later transpires that the money is just a smokescreen for a top-secret document that the gang's leader - actually a KGB officer - is trying to smuggle out of the country. Despite an escalation of security in which the police are eventually joined by the army, navy and air force, it is the scoutmaster's chaotic bungling that leads him to discover the money and flush out the ringleader. At the end it is revealed that the scoutmaster was in fact an undercover police officer and that his bungling was a ruse.
