= Rhubarb Rhubarb =

- Directed by: Eric Sykes
- Written by: Eric Sykes
- Produced by: David Clark
- Starring: Eric Sykes; Jimmy Edwards; Bob Todd; Charlie Drake
- Cinematography: Dusty Miller
- Music by: Denis King
- Release date: 15 December 1980
- Running time: 28 minutes
- Country: United Kingdom
- Language: English

Rhubarb Rhubarb is a 1980 30-minute television comedy special written and directed by Eric Sykes for Thames TV. It is a re-make of Sykes' 1970 film Rhubarb.

== Plot ==
A police inspector is so intent on winning a round of golf against a vicar, despite his lack of ability at the game, that he employs his constable to furtively disentangle his ball from the odd spots in which it usually comes to rest, while his opponent looks for help from a higher power. The constable's help takes on an increasingly miraculous appearance, to the extent of inanimate objects appearing to move in order to block the inspector's shots. However, when the vicar attempts to lie about the number of shots it took to free his ball from a sand trap he gets his comeuppance from a bolt of lightning. In the final scene the entire game is revealed to have been a dream that the vicar had during a brief nap in church.

== Dialogue ==
The word rhubarb is the only one uttered, many times over, in this film. Likewise, the golf game takes place at the Royal Rhubarb golf course, and at one point a character is seen reading a newspaper called The Daily Rhubarb whose headlines consist entirely of the word rhubarb.

In the United Kingdom, it is or was common for a crowd of extras in acting to shout the word rhubarb repeatedly and out of step with each other, to cause the effect of general hubbub. A similar American expression is walla.

== Cast ==
- Eric Sykes as Police Inspector/groom
- Jimmy Edwards as Police Officer
- Bob Todd as vicar
- Charlie Drake as Golf Club Pro
- Bill Fraser as Golf Club Secretary
- Hattie Jacques as nanny
- Roy Kinnear as home owner
- Beryl Reid as home owner's wife
- Norman Rossington as church organist
- April Walker as lady golf pupil/bride
- Nicholas Bond-Owen as little boy
- Robert Carter as baby
