= Sheree Winton =

English actress (1935–1976)

- Born: Shirley June Patrick; 4 November 1935; Sheffield, Yorkshire, England
- Died: 29 May 1976 (aged 40); Hatch End, London, England
- Occupation: Actress
- Years active: 1954–1969
- Spouse: Gary Winton (1954–1965)
- Children: Dale Winton

Shirley June "Sheree" Winton (née Patrick; 4 November 1935 – 29 May 1976) was an English actress, and the mother of television presenter Dale Winton.

== Early life ==
Winton was born on 4 November 1935 in Sheffield, England.

== Career ==
Winton was often referred to as "the English Jayne Mansfield" and appeared in many films and television shows throughout her career. Her film appearances included The Devil's Disciple (1959), Dentist in the Chair (1960), The Road to Hong Kong (1962) and Rhubarb (1969). She was also known for her TV show appearances with Frankie Howerd and Terry-Thomas.

She was chosen Queen for a Day by the Oldham Charity Carnival in 1957. Among her film and TV appearances, she played herself in the series That Was the Week That Was (1962–1963) and Kindly Leave the Stage (1968). She had an uncredited bit part in the James Bond film Thunderball (1965).

== Personal life ==
She married Gary Winton, a furniture salesman, in 1954, and converted to her husband's Jewish faith; they were divorced in 1965, and he died in 1968. She was the mother of television presenter Dale Winton. She took her own life in 1976 by taking a barbiturate overdose after a lifelong battle with clinical depression. She was found by her son Dale, and a "do not disturb" sign was outside her bedroom door.

== Selected filmography ==
- First Man into Space (1959) as nurse at blood bank
- The Devil's Disciple (1959, uncredited)
- Follow a Star (1959, uncredited)
- Dentist in the Chair (1960) as Jayne
- Spike Milligan: A Series of Unrelated Incidents at Current Market Value (1961, TV film)
- It's a Square World (played various characters in 3 episodes, 1961–63)
- The Road to Hong Kong (1962, uncredited)
- Terry-Thomas (1963, TV film)
- The Big Eat (1965, TV film)
- Thunderball (1965, uncredited)
- The Assassination Bureau (1969, uncredited)
- Rhubarb (1969) as Lady Pupil Rhubarb

== Television appearances ==
- Citizen James (1961)
- Man of the World – episode "Blaze of Glory" (1962) as Strait's friend
- Out of This World – episode "The Tycoons" (1962) as a girl
- The Sentimental Agent – episode "A Box Of Tricks" (1963) as fellow traveller
- Espionage – episode "The Incurable One" (1963) as stripper
- HMS Paradise – episode 12 (1964) as Fiona, 3rd Wren
- Frankie Howerd (1964–1966) – played Yvonne in two episodes in 1966
