= Alan Braden =

English composer and musical director (1927–2021)

- Born: Robert Alan Braden; 5 February 1927; Manchester, England
- Died: 6 April 2021 (aged 94); Witney, England
- Occupations: Composer, musical director
- Known for: Composer of theme tunes of British sitcoms and light entertainment shows

Robert Alan Braden (5 February 1927 – 6 April 2021) was an English composer and musical director who composed the theme tunes for several British sitcoms and light entertainment shows of the 1970s and 1980s.

== Early life ==
Braden was born Robert Alan Braden in Manchester. Together with his elder brother, Edwin Braden, he started performing on the stage at five years old and became a member of his brother's "Edwin Braden (Later Eddy and the HornBlowers) and the Royal Sequence Dance Band", playing in it until Edwin was drafted into the Army at the outset of World War II as a reservist Sgt. in the Royal Engineers and served in Norway and through the Italy campaign.

== Wartime ==
At the outbreak of war, Braden was 13 years old but with his father, a railway signalman supervisor (a reserved profession), and his brother of fighting age, he found himself and his mother mostly alone. Already a very accomplished musician, he now found himself much in demand and spent many evenings playing gigs in and around Manchester. He joined the Air Training Corps (ATC) and found himself being prepared to become a navigator. He was duly drafted into the Royal Air Force and trained on Wellington/Lancaster bombers. The war in Europe ended before he was deployed and he was transferred to the Army Signals Corps and prepared for deployment in the Far East. Once again, the war ended before deployment and he was demobbed in 1946. Whilst in the services, he was much in demand as a musician and played in the Royal Corps of Signals band at Catterick training establishment. He recalled having met Glenn Miller, describing him as the absolute cream of the bandleaders.

== Post-war career ==
On demobilisation, he quickly returned to being a full-time musician, playing with many of the big bands of the time, including Joe Loss, Teddy Foster and Ted Heath, as well as forming and leading his own band which toured the UK. His son Stephen met up with a fellow booker in Southsea that had booked Alan in 1948. Ultimately, the lure of television and work from Tin Pan Alley (Denmark Street publishing houses) brought him to London.

Alan Braden was a much-in-demand session clarinetist and saxophonist as well as a talented arranger and composer, and it was not long before he got his first big break on television with the Rediffusion-produced Stars and Garters, a show about a working class pub. of the same name, featuring Braden as the bandleader and starring Kathy Kirby, Clinton Ford and Vince Hill.

== Television ==
Braden's work for television has included London Night Out, The Sooty Show, Night Out at the London Casino, The Two Ronnies, The Chipperfield's Circus Specials, Get Some In!, Armchair Theatre, Up Pompeii, Give Us A Clue, The Ken Dodd Laughter Show, Mike Yarwood in Persons, Billy Dainty Esq., The Tommy Cooper Hour, Name That Tune and the 1979 version of the classic comedy short film The Plank. In the early Sooty Shows the puppet characters were seen to "play" various musical instruments at the end of the show with his 'Sooty-Braden Showband'. Throughout his career, Braden worked with many of the big names of the time, including Nat King Cole, the Beatles, Elton John, Petula Clark, Tom Jones, Tom O'Connor, Lionel Blair, Cilla Black, Roy Hudd, Danny La Rue, Peggy Lee and Louis Armstrong.

== Personal life ==
Braden was married to Margaret Braden and had two sons, Stephen Alan Braden (born 1955) and Philip Robert Braden (1960–2019). He also had three grandchildren and two great-grandchildren. His wife Margaret died in 2000, and he married Susan in 2003.

== Death ==
He died in Witney, Oxfordshire in April 2021 at the age of 94.

== Theatre ==
- Tom Brown's Schooldays (Cambridge Theatre, London 9 May 1972)

== Recording ==
- "Dakota" by The Shadows written by Alan Braden
- "Listen with Us", sung by Clinton Ford with Alan Braden and his Orchestra
- "Chocolate Soldier" / "Firefly" by Alan Braden and his Orchestra
- "Thoroughly Modern Millie - Overture" by Alan Braden
- "Bye Bye Birdie" with Syd James - conducted by Alan Braden
