= Eric Sykes =

English comedian, writer and actor (1923–2012)

Eric Sykes CBE
- Sykes c. 1955
- Born: 4 May 1923; Oldham, Lancashire, England
- Died: 4 July 2012 (aged 89); Esher, Surrey, England
- Notable work: Sykes, The Goon Show, The Plank, Teletubbies
- Spouse: Edith Milbrandt (m. 1952)
- Children: 4

Comedy career
- Years active: 1947–2010
- Medium: Television; radio

Eric Sykes (4 May 1923 – 4 July 2012) was an English radio, stage, television and film writer, comedian, actor and director whose performing career spanned more than 50 years. He frequently wrote for and performed with many other leading comedy performers and writers of the period, including Tony Hancock, Spike Milligan, Tommy Cooper, Peter Sellers, John Antrobus and Johnny Speight. Sykes first came to prominence through his many radio credits as a writer and actor in the 1950s, which include collaboration on some scripts for The Goon Show. He became a television star in his own right in the early 1960s when he appeared with Hattie Jacques in several popular BBC comedy television series.

== Early life ==
Sykes was born on 4 May 1923 in Oldham, Lancashire; his mother died three weeks later, leaving him and his two-year-old brother Vernon motherless. Their father was a labourer in a cotton mill and a former army sergeant. When Sykes was two, his father remarried and he gained a half-brother named John. Sykes was educated at Ward Street Central School in Oldham. He joined the Royal Air Force during the Second World War, qualifying as a wireless operator with the rank of leading aircraftman.

== Career ==
Sykes's entertainment career began during the Second World War while serving in a Special Liaison Unit, when he met and worked with then flight lieutenant Bill Fraser. Sykes also collaborated with fellow RAF servicemen Denis Norden and Ron Rich in the production of troop entertainment shows. Whilst preparing for one of these shows in 1945, Sykes, accompanied by Norden and Rich, went to a nearby prison camp in search of stage lighting; the camp turned out to be the Bergen-Belsen concentration camp, which had recently been liberated by the Allies. Sykes, Norden, and Rich organised a food collection amongst their comrades to feed the starving camp inmates.

When the war ended, Sykes decided to try his luck in London, arriving in the middle of the coldest winter in living memory (1946–47). He rented lodgings, expecting to find work quickly, but by the end of the first week he was cold, hungry, and penniless. The turning point in his life and career came on the Friday night of his first week in London: he had a chance meeting in the street with Bill Fraser, who was by now featuring in a comedy at the Playhouse Theatre. Fraser took the impoverished Sykes to the theatre, offered him food and drink, then asked if Sykes would like to write for him. Sykes began providing scripts for both Fraser and Frankie Howerd and soon found himself in demand as a comedy writer. Forming a partnership with Sid Colin, he worked on the BBC radio ventriloquism show Educating Archie, which began in 1950, and also Variety Bandbox. Working on Educating Archie led to him meeting Hattie Jacques for the first time.

=== 1950s ===
Sykes had begun to write for television as early as 1948, but from the early 1950s Sykes began to make an ultimately successful transition from radio to television, writing a number of series episodes and one-off shows for the BBC. His credits in this period include The Howerd Crowd (1952), Frankie Howerd's Korean Party, Nuts in May, and The Frankie Howerd Show, as well as The Big Man (1954) starring Fred Emney and Edwin Styles. Sykes also made his first screen appearance at this time in the army film comedy Orders Are Orders (1954), which also featured Sid James, Tony Hancock, Peter Sellers, Bill Fraser, and Donald Pleasence.

Sykes's small office above a grocer's shop at 130 Uxbridge Road, Shepherd's Bush, was shared from around 1953 by Spike Milligan. (Sykes and Milligan later jointly formed Associated London Scripts (ALS) with Ray Galton and Alan Simpson, a writers' agency which lasted for well over a decade until being effectively dissolved in 1967). Late in 1954, Sykes began collaborating with Spike Milligan on scripts for The Goon Show, easing Milligan's workload. Their first collaborative script was for a Goon Show special called Archie in Goonland, a crossover between The Goon Show and Educating Archie. The special was broadcast in June 1954 and featured the regular Goon Show cast (Harry Secombe was then appearing in both) plus Peter Brough, his dummy Archie Andrews and Hattie Jacques. It was not a success, however, and neither recording nor the script has survived. Sykes and Milligan are credited as the co-writers of all but the first six of the 26 episodes in Series 5 (1954–55) and three episodes of Series 6 (1955–56); Sykes also wrote a 15-minute Goon Show Christmas special, The Missing Christmas Parcel, broadcast during the Children's Hour on 8 December 1955.

In 1955, Sykes wrote and performed in a BBC Christmas spectacular, a spoof pantomime called Pantomania, which featured many well-known BBC personalities of the era; it was directed by Ernest Maxin, who went on to produce some of the most famous comedy routines for Morecambe & Wise. That same year Sykes signed a contract as scriptwriter and variety show presenter for the newly formed independent television company ATV, while continuing to write and perform for the BBC.

In 1956, Sykes performed, wrote scripts, and acted as script editor for the pioneering Rediffusion television comedy The Idiot Weekly, Price 2d, the first attempt to translate the humour of the Goons to television. It starred Peter Sellers, with Sykes, Kenneth Connor, and Valentine Dyall. During this year he also made his second film appearance, playing a minor role in the Max Bygraves film Charley Moon, which also featured Bill Fraser, Peter Jones, Dennis Price, and (as a child) Jane Asher. During 1956–57, Sykes also wrote for and performed in The Tony Hancock Show, where he again worked with Hattie Jacques.

His next venture for the BBC was a one-hour special, Sykes Directs a Dress Rehearsal, playing a harassed director in a fictional television studio rehearsal room, just before going live to air. Later that year he wrote and appeared in another all-star spectacular called Opening Night which celebrated the opening of the 1956 National Radio Show at Earl's Court. In 1957, he created Closing Night, which closed the 1957 show.

By this time Sykes had developed hearing problems; he subsequently lost most of his hearing, but learned to lip-read and watch other performers say their lines to get his cues. In 1957, he wrote and appeared in an edition of Val Parnell's Saturday Spectacular, the first of two shows in this series that he wrote for Peter Sellers. The first went out under the title of Eric Sykes Presents Peter Sellers, and the second, in 1958, was called The Peter Sellers Show.

In 1959, Sykes wrote and directed the one-off BBC special Gala Opening, with a cast that included 'Professor' Stanley Unwin and Hattie Jacques, and played a small supporting role in the Tommy Steele film Tommy the Toreador.

=== 1960s ===
At the turn of the decade Eric Sykes and his old friend and colleague Hattie Jacques co-starred in a new 30-minute BBC television sitcom, Sykes and a..., which Sykes created in collaboration with writer Johnny Speight, who had worked with him earlier in the 1950s on the two Tony Hancock series for ITV. The original concept for the new series had Eric living in suburbia with his wife, with simple plots centring on everyday problems, but Sykes soon realised that by changing the house-mate from wife to sister it offered more scope for storylines and allowed either or both to become romantically entangled with other people.

In the revised concept, Sykes played a version of his established stage persona, a bumbling, work-shy, accident-prone bachelor called Eric Sykes, who lives at 24 Sebastopol Terrace, East Acton, with his unmarried twin sister Harriet, played by Jacques. The other regular cast members were Deryck Guyler as local constable Wilfred "Corky" Turnbull and Richard Wattis as their snobbish, busybody neighbour Charles Brown. Wattis left the show after series 3 and his departure was explained by having Mr Brown migrating to Australia. Other guests included Hugh Lloyd, John Bluthal, Leo McKern, and Arthur Mullard.

The first series (five episodes, all written by Johnny Speight) premiered on 29 January 1960 and were an immediate hit, establishing 'Eric and Hat' as one of Britain's most popular and enduring comedy partnerships. The second series of six episodes (written from storylines suggested by Speight) were mostly written by Sykes, although he co-wrote one episode each with John Antrobus and Spike Milligan. All subsequent episodes were written solely by Sykes.

Nine short seasons of Sykes and a... were produced between 1960 and 1965, ranging between six and nine episodes each, plus a short 1962 special in the BBC's annual Christmas Night with the Stars programme, are lost. Twenty-five of the original fifty-nine episodes have survived in the BBC archives. It was during this series that Sykes introduced one of his best known creations, the wordless slapstick routine The Plank, which originally appeared in Episode 2, Series 7 of Sykes and a..., first broadcast on 3 March 1964 under that title.

In December 1961, Sykes co-starred with Warren Mitchell in Clicquot et Fils, a one-off, 30-minute comedy written by Associated London Scripts colleagues Ray Galton and Alan Simpson. This was the premiere episode of a new BBC series Comedy Playhouse, which became an important proving ground for many successful television comedy series.

In 1962, Sykes played his first starring film role, being a travelling salesman in the comedy Village of Daughters, set in an Italian village, but featuring a mostly British cast including John Le Mesurier (who was at that time married to Hattie Jacques), and Roger Delgado. This was followed by a supporting role in the MGM British comedy, Kill or Cure, starring Terry-Thomas with a cast of British comedy stalwarts including one of the first film appearances by Ronnie Barker. Both films were made by the same writer-director team behind the popular Margaret Rutherford Miss Marple film, Murder She Said.

During 1965, Sykes made what proved to be the final series of Sykes and a... and appeared in three major films. He had a small role in Those Magnificent Men in Their Flying Machines, joining an all-star cast of British and American television and film luminaries. The spy spoof The Liquidator was directed by Jack Cardiff and starred Rod Taylor with Sykes in a secondary role. His third film of that year was the Boulting brothers' Rotten to the Core starring Anton Rodgers (who replaced Peter Sellers) with Sykes. Sykes had a minor film role in another spy comedy The Spy with a Cold Nose (1966), written by Galton and Simpson.

In 1967, Sykes expanded one of his routines into a 45-minute wordless colour short, The Plank which features, among others, Sykes, Tommy Cooper, Jimmy Edwards, Graham Stark, Hattie Jacques, and future Goodies star Bill Oddie. (The film was later remade for Thames Television in 1978.) Also in 1967, Sykes and his old friend Jimmy Edwards started touring with the theatrical farce Big Bad Mouse which, while keeping more or less to a script, gave them rein to ad lib and address the audience. They would return to the production on and off until 1975, touring the UK twice and also taking the show abroad, including to Australia.

Returning to television, Sykes and Jacques appeared in the 1967 special Sykes Versus ITV with Tommy Cooper and Ronnie Brody. In 1968, he had a supporting role in an Anglo-American film co-production, the Edward Dmytryk western Shalako, starring Sean Connery and Brigitte Bardot.

In 1969, Sykes co-starred with Spike Milligan in the ill-fated television sitcom Curry and Chips, a satire on racial prejudice created and written by Johnny Speight and made for London Weekend Television. Milligan, who had grown up in British India, played Kevin O'Grady, a half-Pakistani half-Irish man who comes to work in a British factory and ends up boarding with his ineffectual foreman Arthur Blenkinsop (Sykes), who has to regularly defend Kevin against his racist workmates. The supporting cast included pop singer turned actor Kenny Lynch, Geoffrey Hughes, Norman Rossington, Sam Kydd, Jerrold Wells, and Fanny Carby as Arthur and Kevin's landlady. The series provoked a storm of complaints about its liberal use of racist epithets and bad language (although Sykes refused to swear, as he did throughout his career). It was cancelled on the instruction of the Independent Broadcasting Authority after a series of six episodes.

Sykes also made another minor film appearance in 1969 in the comedy Monte Carlo or Bust!, which was also titled as Those Daring Young Men in Their Jaunty Jalopies.

=== 1970s ===
In 1970, Sykes returned to BBC television with a guest appearance in an episode of Till Death Us Do Part. This was followed in 1971 by a six-episode series, Sykes and a Big, Big Show, for the BBC and a special, Sykes: With the Lid Off, for Thames Television.

In 1972, seven years after the cancellation of Sykes and a..., the BBC revived the series under the title Sykes. 68 colour episodes of Sykes were made between 1972 and 1979; forty-three of the shows were re-workings of scripts from the 1960s series, which had been recorded in monochrome. These included a remake of the 1960s episode Sykes and a Stranger, guest-starring Peter Sellers as the stranger, Tommy Grando, in what was to be Sellers's final television role. During the 1970s, Sykes and Jimmy Edwards took part in a performance of Big Bad Mouse entertaining Rhodesian troops for Ian Smith, the Prime Minister of Rhodesia.

In 1973, Sykes had a small role as a police sergeant in the Douglas Hickox thriller Theatre of Blood.

In 1977, Sykes wrote and starred in another television special, Eric Sykes Shows a Few of Our Favourite Things. He also wrote the script for the 1977 Yorkshire Television adaptation of Charley's Aunt and appeared in the role of Brassett.

The third version of The Plank was made in 1979 for Thames TV as a half-hour television special.

=== 1980s ===
Sykes wrote and appeared in two Thames Television specials broadcast during 1980 – The Likes of Sykes and Rhubarb Rhubarb. The latter special, a remake of his 1969 short film Rhubarb which Sykes also directed, featured many of his old friends including Jimmy Edwards, Bob Todd, Charlie Drake, Bill Fraser, Roy Kinnear, Beryl Reid, and Norman Rossington. It was his last screen appearance with Hattie Jacques. The film employed an idea drawn from the British showbiz tradition in which extras used the word "rhubarb" to simulate low-level background dialogue, which had also been a running joke in The Goon Show. In 1981, Sykes wrote, directed, and starred in the offbeat comedy If You Go Down in the Woods Today for Thames, with a cast including Roy Kinnear, Fulton Mackay, and George Sewell.

During 1982, Sykes played the Chief Constable in the slapstick police comedy film The Boys in Blue, which starred the comedy duo Cannon and Ball, with Jon Pertwee. For Thames TV that year, he also appeared in and wrote The Eric Sykes 1990 Show with Tommy Cooper, Dandy Nichols and John Williams (guitarist) and It's Your Move, a wordless slapstick comedy depicting the travails of a couple (Richard Briers and Sylvia Syms) moving into a new home, who hire an accident-prone firm of house removers, headed by Sykes. It featured an all-star cast including Tommy Cooper, Bernard Cribbins, Jimmy Edwards, Irene Handl, Bob Todd, and Andrew Sachs. Sykes produced one further silent film for Thames in 1988, Mr. H. Is Late, set at a funeral. In 1984, Sykes played the Genie in the children's film Gabrielle and the Doodleman, which also featured Windsor Davies (who would also appear with Sykes in the BBC's Gormenghast in 2000), Bob Todd, Lynsey de Paul, and Gareth Hunt.

In 1985, he played the Mad Hatter in the Anglia Television serial adaptation of Alice in Wonderland, joining an all-star cast that included Michael Bentine, Leslie Crowther, and Leonard Rossiter, and he also had an uncredited role (as an arcade attendant) in the Julien Temple film musical Absolute Beginners (1986) which stars Patsy Kensit. In 1986, Sykes played Horace Harker in "The Six Napoleons", an episode of the Granada TV adaptation of the Sherlock Holmes stories starring Jeremy Brett.

Sykes toured Australia with the play Run for Your Wife (1987–88) with a cast that included Jack Smethurst, David McCallum, and Katy Manning. In 1989, in his first series since the Sykes series ended in 1979, Sykes starred as the golf club secretary in the ITV situation comedy The Nineteenth Hole, written by Johnny Speight. It was not a success and ran for only one season, being dropped by ITV for being unfunny, racist, and sexist.

=== 1990s ===
In 1994, Sykes appeared in both episodes of Paul Merton's Palladium Story, a documentary series celebrating the history of the London Palladium. From March 1997, Sykes, together with Tim Whitnall, Toyah Willcox provided narration for the BBC pre-school television series Teletubbies. It is his voice that announces "Teletubbies!" during the title sequence and on the show's theme song, "Teletubbies say "Eh-oh!"", which became a number one single in December 1997. He also voiced The Scary Lion in The Lion and Bear Magical Event. In 1998, Sykes appeared in one episode of Dinnerladies as the father of Stan (Duncan Preston).

=== 2000s ===
In 2000, Sykes appeared as Mollocks, the servant of Dr Prunesquallor, in the BBC's mini-series adaptation of Mervyn Peake's Gormenghast, which was the last production to feature both Milligan and Sykes (although they did not appear together on screen). In 2001, he had one of his few serious screen roles, playing a servant in the blockbuster supernatural thriller film The Others, starring Nicole Kidman. In 2005, he played Frank Bryce in Harry Potter and The Goblet of Fire.

In 2007, he appeared in Last of the Summer Wine and in New Tricks, as well as taking a small role in an episode of the sitcom My Family. That year he also had a small part in the film Son of Rambow. In October 2010 Sykes appeared in Hallowe'en Party, an episode in the twelfth series of Agatha Christie's Poirot.

His autobiography, If I Don't Write It, Nobody Else Will, was published in 2005, by Harper Perennial. He also wrote novels, including UFOs are Coming Wednesday (1995, Virgin Publishing), Smelling of Roses (1997, Virgin Publishing), The Great Crime of Grapplewick (1984, MacMillan London Ltd). These three have been published as The Eric Sykes Compendium by Virgin Publications in 1997: ISBN 978 0 7535 1193 0.

== Personal life ==
Sykes became partially deaf as an adult. His hearing started to deteriorate in the Second World War, and he had an operation in 1952 followed by another two years later. Recovering from the second procedure he discovered he was profoundly deaf. His spectacles contained no lenses but were a bone-conducting hearing aid. Disciform macular degeneration, brought about by age and possibly smoking, left Sykes partially sighted, and he was registered as blind. He was a patron of the Macular Disease Society. He stopped smoking cigarettes in November 1966, but continued to smoke cigars until 1998. He underwent quadruple heart bypass surgery in 1997, and experienced a stroke in 2002.

Sykes married Edith Eleanore Milbrandt on 14 February 1952, and they had three daughters and a son. In the year Sykes died they marked their 60th wedding anniversary.

In the 1970s, Sykes and his friend Jimmy Edwards took part in a show for Ian Smith in Rhodesia.

Sykes was appointed Officer of the Order of the British Empire (OBE) in 1986 and promoted to Commander (CBE) in the 2005 New Year Honours for services to drama, following a petition by Members of Parliament (MPs). Sykes was an honorary president of the Goon Show Preservation Society.

Sykes was a follower of Oldham Athletic and was an honorary director of the club in the 1970s.

=== Death and legacy ===
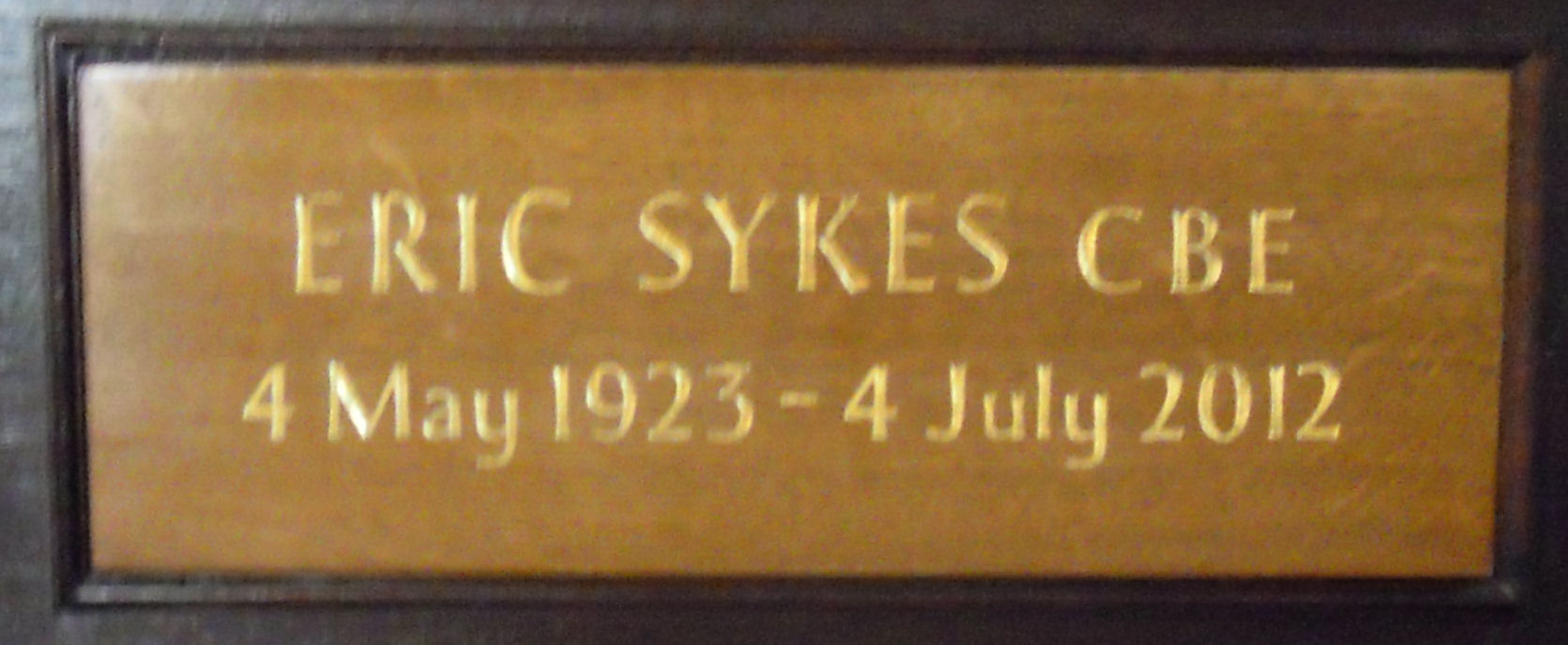
Memorial plaque to Eric Sykes in St Paul's Church in Covent Garden

Sykes died on the morning of 4 July 2012, aged 89, at his home in Esher, Surrey, after a short illness. His family was with him when he died. He has a memorial plaque in St Paul's Church in Covent Garden.

== Honours and awards ==
- 1961 Guild of TV Producers and Directors' Lifetime Achievement Award
- 1964 BBC Television Personality of the Year
- 1980 Pye Colour TV Award
- 1980 The Golden Rose of Montreux (for The Plank)
- 1985 The 25th Golden Rose of Montreux
- 1986 OBE
- 1988 Freedom of the City of London
- 1992 Lifetime Achievement Award from Writers' Guild of Great Britain
- 1992 Lifetime Achievement Award from the British Comedy Awards
- 1998 Honorary Fellowship of the University of Lancaster
- 1998 Eric Morecambe Award from Comic Heritage
- 2001 Lifetime Achievement Award from the Grand Order of Water Rats
- 2001 Bernard Delfont Award for outstanding contribution to show business from the Variety Club of Great Britain
- 2002 Oldie of the Year
- 2004 CBE
- 2009 Aardman Slapstick Visual Comedy Award for the outstanding contribution to the field of visual comedy he had made over his career

== Film and television ==
=== Films he created and appeared in ===
- Pantomania, or Dick Whittington (1956 TV film)
- Dress Rehearsal (1956 television film) as Director
- Opening Night (1956 television film) as Himself
- Closing Night (1957) as Himself
- Gala Opening (1959) as Himself
- The Plank (1967) as Smaller Workman
- It's Your Move (1969)
- Rhubarb (1969 short) as Insp. Rhubarb
- Mr. H is Late (1969)
- Sykes: With the Lid Off (1971 television film)
- Eric Sykes Shows a Few of our Favourite Things (1977) as Eric / Jack
- The Plank (1979 television short), a remake of The Plank (1967)
- The Likes of Sykes (1980 television film)
- Rhubarb Rhubarb (1980), a remake of Rhubarb (1969), as Police Inspector / Groom
- If You Go Down in the Woods Today (1981) as Mr. Pangbourne
- The Eric Sykes 1990 Show (1982 television film) as Producer
- It's Your Move (1982 television short), a remake of It's Your Move (1969), as Head Removal Man
- Mr. H Is Late (1988 television short) as Senior undertaker
- The Big Freeze (1993 television film) as Mr. Blick

=== Television series he created and appeared in ===
- Sykes and a... (1960–1965) as Himself
- Sykes and a Big Big Show (1971)
- Sykes (1972–1979) as Himself

=== Other acting roles ===
The following entries are films unless otherwise stated.

- Orders Are Orders (1954) as Pte. Waterhouse
- Charley Moon (1956) as Brother-in-Law
- Tommy the Toreador (1959) as Martin
- Watch Your Stern (1960) as Civilian Electrician No. 2
- Very Important Person (1961) as Willoughby, Sports Officer
- Invasion Quartet (1961) as Band Conductor
- Village of Daughters (1962) as Herbert Harris
- Kill or Cure (1962) as Rumbelow
- Heavens Above! (1963) as Harry Smith
- The Bargee (1964) as The Mariner
- One Way Pendulum (1964) as Mr. Groomkirby
- Those Magnificent Men in Their Flying Machines (1965) as Courtney
- Rotten to the Core (1965) as William Hunt
- The Liquidator (1965) as Griffen
- Big Bad Mouse (1966, television film) as Mr. Bloome
- The Spy with a Cold Nose (1966) as Wrigley
- Sykes Versus ITV (1967, television film)
- Shalako (1968) as Mako
- Monte Carlo or Bust (1969) as Perkins
- Big Bad Mouse (1972, television film) as Mr. Bloome
- Theatre of Blood (1973) as Sergeant Dogge
- Charlie's Aunt (1977, television film) as Brassett
- The Boys in Blue (1982) as Chief Constable Cranshaw
- Gabrielle and the Doodleman (1984) as Genie
- The Six Napoleons (1986) as the journalist Horace Harker
- Splitting Heirs (1993) as Jobson the Doorman
- Dinnerladies (1998, television series) as Jim
- One Foot in the Grave (2001, television short) as Uncle Dick
- Mavis and the Mermaid (2000, short) as Skip
- Gormenghast (2000, miniseries) as Mollocks
- The Others (2001) as Mr. Edmund Tuttle
- Harry Potter and the Goblet of Fire (2005) as Frank Bryce
- My Family (2007) as Henry
- Son of Rambow (2007) as Frank
- Agatha Christie's Poirot: Hallowe'en Party (2010 television episode) as Mr. Fullerton (final appearance)

== Records ==
- "Dr Kildare"/"Bedtime Story" (Y7092, 7-inch single, Decca Records 1962) with Hattie Jacques
- Eric and Hattie and Things (LK 4507, LP, Decca Records 1962) with Hattie Jacques
