= Jimmy Edwards =

English comedy actor (1920–1988)

Jimmy Edwards DFC
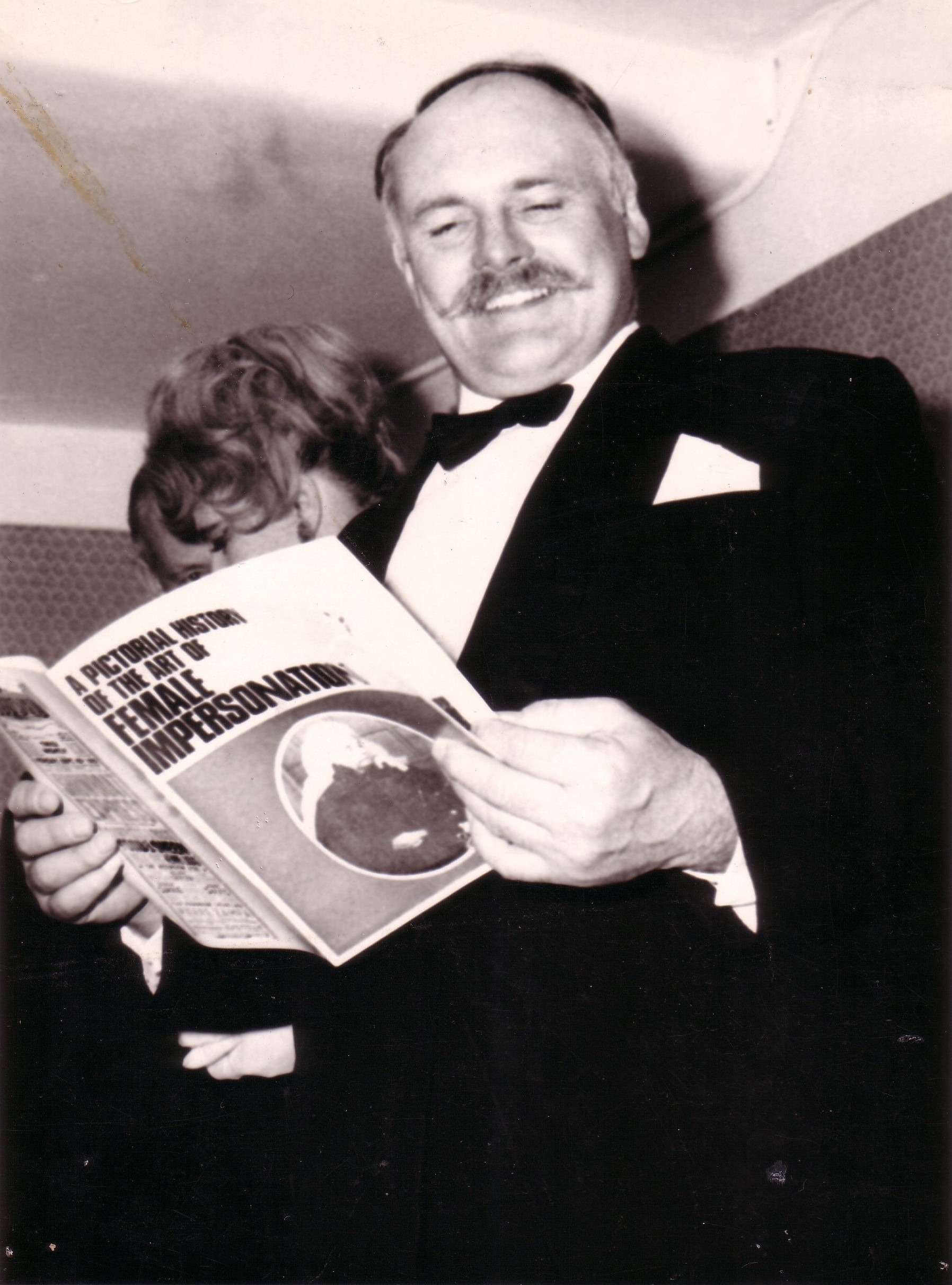
- Edwards at a book launch, 1966
- Born: James Keith O'Neill Edwards; 23 March 1920; Barnes, Surrey, England
- Died: 7 July 1988 (aged 68); London, England
- Resting place: Church of St Andrew and St Mary the Virgin, Fletching, East Sussex, England
- Occupations: Comedy writer, actor
- Years active: 1946–1988
- Political party: Conservative
- Spouse: Valerie Seymour (m. 1958; div. 1969)

James Keith O'Neill Edwards, DFC (23 March 1920 – 7 July 1988) was an English comedy writer and actor of stage, radio, television and film, known for his roles as Pa Glum in Take It from Here and as headmaster "Professor" James Edwards in Whack-O!

== Early life ==
Edwards was born in Barnes, Surrey, the son of Reginald Walter Kenrick Edwards, lecturer in mathematics at King's College London, and Phyllis Katherine Cowan, from New Zealand. He was the eighth of nine children and fifth of five sons. His father died in 1935, leaving the family in dire financial straits. Jimmy's brother Alan had to leave school and enter the mounted police, while his brother Hugh joined the Merchant Navy as an apprentice aged fourteen. Hugh subsequently gained a reputation as a smuggler of cigarettes, whisky and occasionally people, and published a memoir, Midnight Trader, in 1959.

Edwards was educated at St Paul's Cathedral School, where he became head boy, and attended the Silver Jubilee of George V in that capacity. His poem "The Train", which first appeared in The Mortarboard – a school magazine founded by Edwards in competition with the existing one – was included in Walter de la Mare's compilation of children's poems, This Year, Next Year (1937). Having won a scholarship, Edwards went on to King's College School in Wimbledon. He subsequently became a choral scholar at St John's College, Cambridge, where he studied history and sang in the college choir.

== Second World War ==
Edwards served in the Royal Air Force during the Second World War, was commissioned in April 1942, was awarded the Distinguished Flying Cross, and ended the war as a flight lieutenant. He served with No. 271 Squadron RAF, based in Doncaster, which took part in the D-Day landings. His Dakota was shot down at Arnhem in 1944, resulting in facial injuries requiring plastic surgery. He subsequently camouflaged his disfigurement with the large handlebar moustache that became his trademark. His injuries and their treatment made him a member of the Guinea Pig Club.

== Acting career ==
=== Radio and television ===
Edwards was a feature of London theatre in post-war years, debuting at London's Windmill Theatre in 1946 and on BBC radio the same year. His early variety act, where he first used the name Professor Jimmy Edwards, was described by Roy Hudd as being "a mixture of university lecture, RAF slang, the playing of various loud wind instruments and old-fashioned attack". Edwards was in the London Laughs revue at the Adelphi Theatre, London, from 12 April 1952 to 6 February 1954 with Tony Hancock and Vera Lynn. He had previously performed in the Cambridge Footlights revue. He gained wider exposure as a radio performer in Take It from Here, co-starring Dick Bentley, which first paired his writer Frank Muir with Bentley's script writer, Denis Norden. Also on radio he featured in Jim the Great and My Wildest Dream.

He appeared in Whack-O! on television, also written by Muir and Norden, and the radio panel game Does the Team Think?, a series which Edwards created. In 1960 a film of Whack-O! called Bottoms Up was written by Michael Pertwee with additional dialogue by Muir and Norden. On TV he appeared in The Seven Faces of Jim, Six More Faces of Jim and More Faces of Jim; Make Room for Daddy, Sykes, Bold As Brass, I Object, John Jorrocks Esq, The Auction Game, Jokers Wild, Sir Yellow, Doctor in the House, Charley's Aunt, Brendon Chase and Oh! Sir James! (which he also wrote).

He was the subject of This Is Your Life in 1958 when he was surprised by Eamonn Andrews at the BBC's Piccadilly 1 Studio.

Edwards starred in The Fossett Saga in 1969 as James Fossett, an ambitious Victorian writer of penny dreadfuls, with Sam Kydd playing Herbert Quince, his unpaid manservant, and June Whitfield playing music-hall singer Millie Goswick. This was shown on Fridays at 20:30 on LWT; David Freeman was the creator.

=== Stage and film ===
In December 1958, Edwards played the King in Rodgers and Hammerstein's Cinderella at the London Coliseum with Kenneth Williams, Tommy Steele, Yana and Betty Marsden; Bobby Howell was the musical director.

On 2 April 1966, he played at the last night of Melbourne's Tivoli Theatre. His final words closed a tradition of Australian music hall. "I don't relish the distinction of being the man who closed the Tiv. Music hall's dead in Britain. Now this one's dead, there's nowhere to go. I'll either become a character comedian or a pauper."

Edwards frequently worked with Eric Sykes, acting in short films that Sykes wrote: The Plank (1967), which also starred Tommy Cooper; alongside Arthur Lowe in the remake of The Plank in 1979; and in Rhubarb (1969), which again featured Sykes. The films were not silent but had very little dialogue. He also appeared in The Bed Sitting Room (1969) as Nigel, a man who lives in a left luggage compartment after being mistaken for a suitcase.

Edwards and Sykes toured British theatres with their farce Big Bad Mouse which, while scripted, let them ad lib, involve the audience and break the "fourth wall". The show initially had a six-week run at the Palace Theatre, Manchester during which Edwards and Sykes had followed the script, with these performances greeted with universally poor reviews. Sensing that cancellation was imminent Edwards told Sykes that he intended to "have a bit of fun" with the show and for what was expected to be the last week of the run the two stars began to deviate heavily from the script. However, the new, more improvised version proved a success with audiences and led to a long run for the show at the Shaftesbury Theatre.

Sykes was replaced by Roy Castle in later runs in its three-year residency at the Shaftesbury Theatre in London's West End and in tours of the Middle East and Australia. Edwards and Sykes also performed the show for Rhodesian troops at the request of the country's prime minister, Ian Smith, a controversial event at the time. Edwards also starred in the stage revival of Maid of the Mountains.

== Personal life ==
Edwards published two autobiographies: Take it From Me in 1953 and Six of the Best in 1984. He was vice-president of the City of Oxford Silver Band, and an accomplished player of tuba and euphonium. He was founder and a lifelong member of the Handlebar Club, in which all the members had such moustaches. He played at Ham Polo Club. Roy Plomley interviewed him for the BBC's Desert Island Discs on 1 August 1951.

Edwards was a lifelong Conservative and in the 1964 general election stood for Paddington North, without success. His candidature drew wide media attention, much of it derisive, although the local party insisted they had chosen "Jimmy Edwards the man" rather than the comedian. As a result of this failed candidature, he took to introducing himself as "Professor James Edwards, MA, Cantab, Failed MP".

In the 1970s, Edwards and his friend Eric Sykes took part in a show for Ian Smith in Rhodesia.

He was a devotee of fox hunting at Ringmer, near Lewes. He was Rector of the University of Aberdeen from 1951 to 1954.

He was married to Valerie Seymour for 11 years. In 1979, he was exposed as a homosexual to his annoyance. After the ending of his marriage, press reports spoke of his engagement to Joan Turner, actress, singer and comedian, but the reports were suspected to be a mutual publicity stunt. During the 2015 Gold documentary Frankie Howerd: The Lost Tapes, Edwards was mentioned by Barry Cryer as one of several performers of the post-war era forced to conceal their homosexuality as a result of prevailing norms. He lived in Fletching, East Sussex and died from pneumonia in London in 1988 at the age of 68.

His home movies are held by the Cinema Museum in London.

== Selected filmography ==
- Trouble in the Air (1948) – B. Barrington Crockett
- Murder at the Windmill (1949) – as himself
- Helter Skelter (1949) – Dr James Edwards
- Treasure Hunt (1952) – Hercules Ryall / Sir Roderick Ryall
- Innocents in Paris (1953) – Captain George Stilton
- An Alligator Named Daisy (1955) – Alligator Owner (uncredited)
- Three Men in a Boat (1956) – Harris
- Bottoms Up (1960) – Prof. Jim Edwards
- Nearly a Nasty Accident (1961) – Group Capt. Kingsley
- A Ghost of a Chance (1967) – Sir Jocelyn Hermitage
- The Plank (1967) – Policeman
- The Bed Sitting Room (1969) – Nigel
- Rhubarb (1969) – PC Rhubarb

== Notes ==
Academic offices
Preceded by Baron Tweedsmuir	Rector of the University of Aberdeen; 1951–1954	Succeeded by Rhoderick McGrigor
