= Sykes (TV series) =

British TV sitcom (1972–1979)

- Eric Sykes on Sykes DVD cover
- Starring: Eric Sykes; Hattie Jacques; Deryck Guyler; Richard Wattis
- Country of origin: United Kingdom
- Original language: English
- No. of series: 7
- No. of episodes: 68

Production
- Producer: Roger Race
- Running time: 30 minutes
- Production company: BBC

Original release
- Network: BBC1
- Release: 14 September 1972 – 16 November 1979

Related
- Sykes and a...

Sykes is a British sitcom that aired on BBC1 from 1972 to 1979. Starring Eric Sykes and Hattie Jacques, it was written by Sykes, who had previously starred with Jacques in Sykes and a... (1960–1965) and Sykes and a Big, Big Show (1971). Forty-three of the 1970s colour episodes were remakes of scripts for the 1960s black and white series, such as "Bus" based on "Sykes and a Following" from 1964 and the episode "Stranger" with Peter Sellers based on "Sykes and a Stranger" from 1961.

Sykes had the same premise as Sykes and a... with Sykes, Jacques, Richard Wattis and Deryck Guyler reprising their former identical roles. The series was brought to an end by the death of Hattie Jacques of a heart attack on 6 October 1980.

== Cast ==
- Eric Sykes – Himself
- Hattie Jacques – Harriet (Hat) Sykes
- Richard Wattis – Charles Fulbright-Brown (series 1–3)
- Deryck Guyler – PC Corky Turnbull
- Joy Harington – Melody Rumbelow
- Joan Sims – Madge Kettlewell

== Plot ==
With the same premise as Sykes and a..., unmarried twins Eric and Harriet (Hat) Sykes are now living at an end of terrace house, 28 Sebastopol Terrace, East Acton, two doors down from their house in the previous programme. As before, Eric is childish and accident-prone while Hattie is patient. Their neighbour is the snobbish unmarried Charles Fulbright-Brown, and PC Corky Turnbull is the local policeman. Corky's wife, Elsie, is unseen, except for two episodes, "Caravan", in which she appears with her face covered in porridge during a food fight between Corky and Eric, and "Holiday Camp", when the back of her head is shown going into the Ghost Train ride, and later on asleep and passing wind in bed. Deryck Guyler also played Corky's brother Wilfred Turnbull, a train attendant on the Glasgow to London sleeper train, in the episode "Journey". He also played another relative, bus inspector Norman Burnside in "Bus".

Following the death of Richard Wattis in 1975, a new neighbour, Melody Rumbelow, moves in. The local baker is the widowed Madge Kettlewell (Joan Sims), who appears occasionally, and who fancies Eric. She is first seen in the episode "Football". Eric and Hattie are also the owners of a cuckoo clock, naming the very temperamental bird inside Peter. Both speak to it as if it were a real bird, and a great deal of comedy derives from the antagonistic and sarcastic "conversation" between Eric and Peter.

== Episodes ==
=== Series 1 (1972) ===
No. overall	No. in series	Title	Original release date
1	1	"Burglary"	14 September 1972
2	2	"Uncle"	21 September 1972
3	3	"Walk"	28 September 1972
4	4	"Menace"	5 October 1972
5	5	"Boat"	12 October 1972
6	6	"Stranger"	19 October 1972
7	7	"Football"	26 October 1972
8	8	"Job"	2 November 1972
9	9	"Ankle"	9 November 1972
10	10	"Mouse"	16 November 1972
11	11	"Dream"	23 November 1972
12	12	"Marriage"	30 November 1972
13	13	"Cat"	7 December 1972
14	14	"Journey"	14 December 1972
15	15	"Lodger"	21 December 1972
16	16	"Cafe"	28 December 1972

=== Series 2 (1973) ===
No. overall	No. in series	Title	Original release date
17	1	"An Engagement"	10 September 1973
18	2	"Bus"	17 September 1973
19	3	"Spy Ring"	24 September 1973
20	4	"Golf"	1 October 1973
21	5	"Rolls"	8 October 1973
22	6	"Peeping Tom"	15 October 1973
23	7	"Fancy Dress"	22 October 1973
24	8	"Window Smasher"	29 October 1973
25	9	"Gamble"	5 November 1973
26	10	"Uniform"	12 November 1973
27	11	"Bird"	19 November 1973
28	12	"Protest"	26 November 1973
29	13	"Salesman"	3 December 1973
30	14	"Haunting"	10 December 1973
31	15	"Nest Egg"	17 December 1973

=== Series 3 (1974) ===
No. overall	No. in series	Title	Original release date
32	1	"The Stolen Bentley"	17 October 1974
33	2	"Holiday in Bogsea"	24 October 1974
34	3	"The Pub"	31 October 1974
35	4	"The Band"	7 November 1974
36	5	"Two Birthdays"	14 November 1974
37	6	"A Bandage"	21 November 1974
38	7	"Log Cabin"	28 November 1974
39	8	"The Fog"	5 December 1974

=== Series 4 (1975) ===
No. overall	No. in series	Title	Original release date
40	1	"Commercial"	24 October 1975
41	2	"Ski-ing"	31 October 1975
42	3	"Caravan"	7 November 1975
43	4	"Reporter"	14 November 1975
44	5	"Marriage"	28 November 1975
45	6	"Night Out"	5 December 1975
46	7	"Christmas Party"	12 December 1975

=== Series 5 (1976) ===
No. overall	No. in series	Title	Original release date
47	1	"Home Movies"	11 November 1976
48	2	"Fishing"	18 November 1976
49	3	"Lodgers"	25 November 1976
50	4	"Holiday Camp"	2 December 1976
51	5	"Inventions"	9 December 1976
52	6	"Flashback"	16 December 1976
53	7	"Squatters"	23 December 1976
54	8	"Bath"	30 December 1976

=== Christmas Special (1977) ===
No. overall	No. in series	Title	Original release date
55	1	"Sykes at Christmas"	22 December 1977

=== Series 6 (1978) ===
No. overall	No. in series	Title	Original release date
56	1	"The Hypnotist"	4 January 1978
57	2	"Picket Line"	11 January 1978
58	3	"Football Match"	18 January 1978
59	4	"Decorating"	25 January 1978
60	5	"End of the World"	1 February 1978
61	6	"Television Film"	8 February 1978

=== Series 7 (1979) ===
No. overall	No. in series	Title	Original release date
62	1	"The Drop Out"	5 October 1979
63	2	"Fanny-By-Gaslight"	12 October 1979
64	3	"The Stay-at-Home Holiday"	19 October 1979
65	4	"Bad Medicine"	26 October 1979
66	5	"The Insurance Money"	2 November 1979
67	6	"Six Million Dollar Sykes"	9 November 1979
68	7	"The BBC Honours Sykes"	16 November 1979

== DVD releases ==
The first series of Sykes was released on DVD in the UK (Region 2) in 2004. Several episodes in this set were reassembled from the original studio sessions rather than the broadcast masters. This not only yielded better quality, but also allowed scenes that had been cut for timing purposes to be restored, and for outtakes to be included as extras. Conversely, since the colour videotape of the episode "Journey" had been wiped this episode was taken from a black and white copy. A brief featurette explains some of the restoration techniques employed.

A Complete Series DVD set (containing all 68 episodes) was released on 26 June 2017. Series 1 is represented by the remastered episodes and featurettes from the previous set. The rest of the episodes do not exhibit the same level of remastering, although some of them do appear to be extended versions.
