= Hattie Jacques =

English actress (1922–1980)

Hattie Jacques

Hattie Jacques (/dʒeɪks/; born Josephine Edwina Jaques; 7 February 1922 – 6 October 1980) was an English comedy actress of stage, radio and screen. She is best known as a regular of the Carry On films, in which she typically played strict, no-nonsense characters, but was also a prolific television and radio performer.

Jacques started her career in 1944 with an appearance at the Players' Theatre in London, but came to national prominence through her appearances on three highly popular radio series on the BBC: with Tommy Handley on It's That Man Again; with ventriloquist Peter Brough on Educating Archie; and then with Tony Hancock on Hancock's Half Hour. After the Second World War Jacques made her cinematic debut in Green for Danger (1946), in which she had a brief, uncredited role. From 1958 to 1974 she appeared in 14 Carry On films, playing various roles including the formidable hospital matron. On television she had a long professional partnership with Eric Sykes, with whom she co-starred in his long-running series Sykes and Sykes and a.... The role endeared her to the public and the two became staples of British television.

In private, Jacques led a turbulent life. She was married to the actor John Le Mesurier from 1949 until their divorce in 1965, a separation caused by her five-year affair with another man. Jacques, who had been overweight since her teenage years, suffered ill-health soon after the separation from Le Mesurier and her weight rose to nearly 20 stone (280 lb; 130 kg). She died of a heart attack on 6 October 1980, at the age of 58. Her biographer, Frances Gray, considers Jacques had a "talent for larger-than-life comedy which never lost its grip on humanity", while she could also display "a broader comic mode" as a result of her "extraordinary versatility".

== Biography ==
=== Early life: 1922–1944 ===
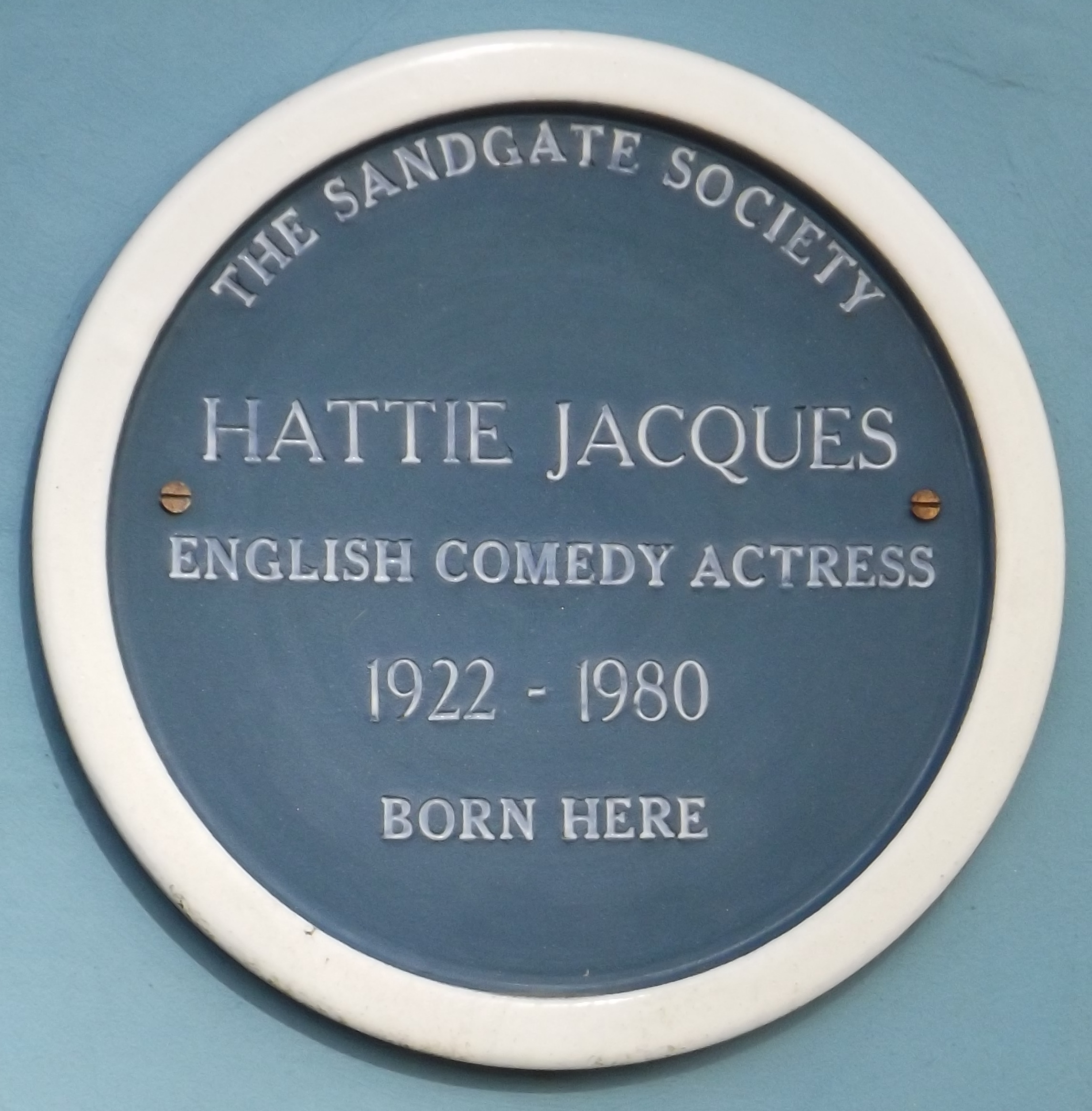
Blue plaque at the house where Jacques was born: 125 High Street, Sandgate, Kent

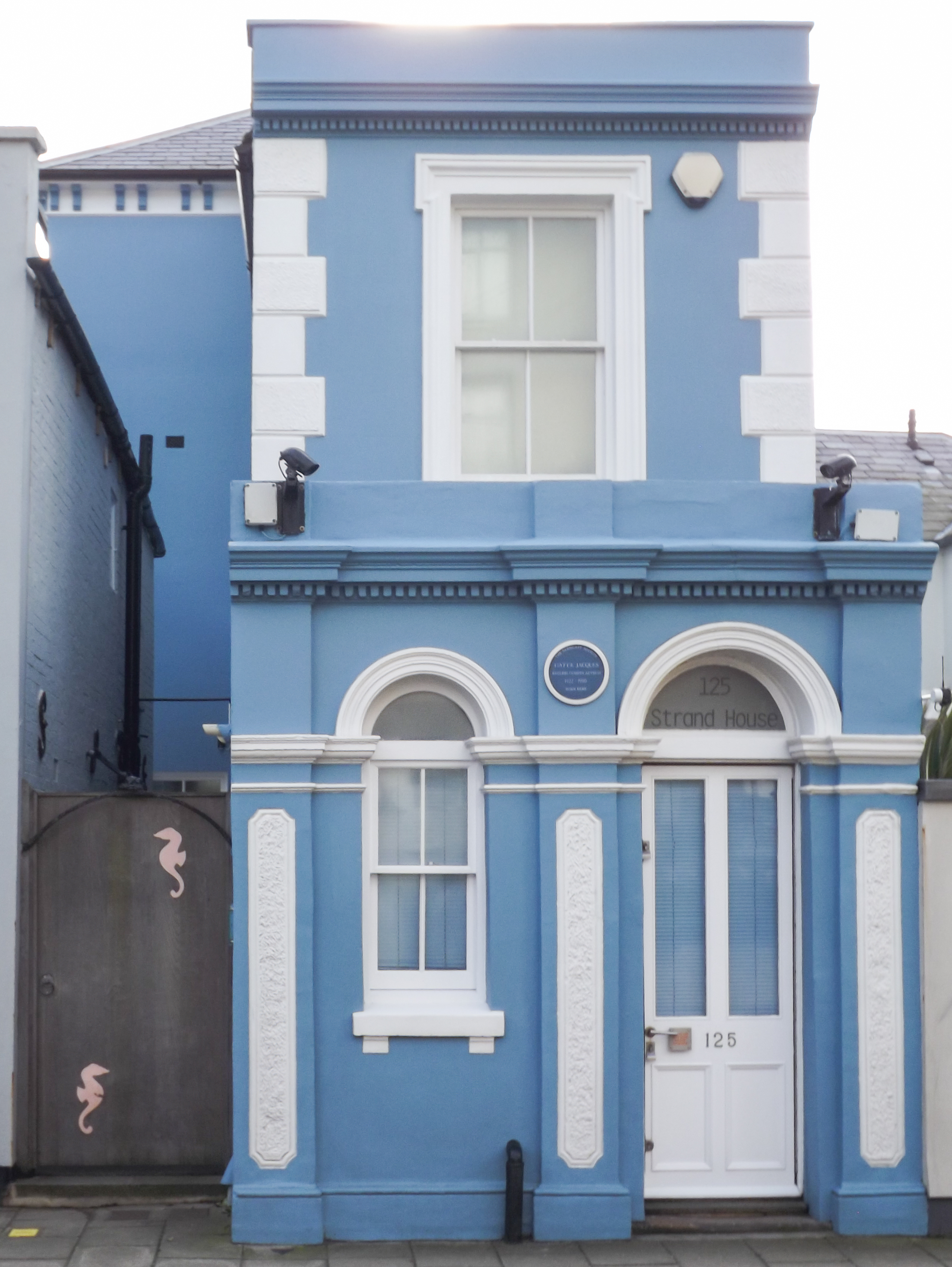
125 High Street, Sandgate

Jacques was born Josephine Edwina Jaques on 7 February 1922 at 125 Sandgate High Street, Sandgate, Kent. She was the youngest child of Robin Rochester Jaques, an officer in the British Army and later a flying officer in the Royal Air Force, and Mary Jaques (née Thorn), a nurse who served in the Voluntary Aid Detachment (VAD). (Note: Robin was born into relative affluence in Newcastle upon Tyne. His father Joseph Rochester Jaques was a billiard room manager from Northumberland who married Florence King, the daughter of a Devon-born bookseller. Hattie's maternal grandfather Joseph Thorn (1875–?) was a jeweller who lived at 65 Brompton Road in London. The address is notable today for being the current business premises of the upmarket jewellers Mappin & Webb.)

The Jaques family were predominantly non-theatrical, with the exception of Mary who appeared in the small role of Harry Hathaway in the Christmas pantomime Robinson Crusoe at the Palace Theatre, Cologne, in 1920. Mary enjoyed the theatre, and took Jacques to live performances from an early age. The result had a "profound effect" on the young girl, particularly a love of dance. Robin Rochester Jaques, who attained the rank of flight lieutenant with the RAF, was a keen sportsman and became a semi-professional footballer. He signed to Clapton Orient and Fulham F.C., but his career was cut short when he died in a flying accident on 8 August 1923. Upon his death, Mary, Jacques and her elder brother Robin moved from Newton in Lincolnshire to London, where Jacques was sent to the Lady Margaret primary school in Chelsea. In July 1930 Jacques started her secondary schooling at the Godolphin and Latymer School in Hammersmith, and also attended a local dance school, the Dean Sisters Academy, where she was a principal dancer in the academy's shows. She left Godolphin and Latymer in the summer of 1939 with unremarkable grades. She continued intermittently with amateur theatricals, and in May 1939 appeared with the Curtain Club in Barnes in productions of Fumed Oak and Borgia.

At the outbreak of the Second World War Jacques became a nurse in the Voluntary Aid Detachment (VAD); she served in a mobile unit in London, attending bombed sites during the Blitz. After a reorganisation in the VAD, (Note: The VAD mobile units, based in communal air raid shelters and London Underground stations, were discontinued in June 1942.) Jacques sought new work and, in the summer of 1943, she became a welder in a factory in north London, a job that lasted until the end of the year. Around this time she became romantically involved with an American soldier, Major Charles Kearney. Jacques later claimed that the pair had been engaged and that Kearney had been killed in action, although her biographer, Andy Merriman, discovered that Kearney had a wife and children in the United States when he had proposed to Jacques, and had returned to them after the war. (Note: The couple last saw each other in March 1945, and last corresponded with each other in May of the same year.)

=== Early post-war work: 1944–1950 ===
In 1944, after being auditioned by Leonard Sachs, Jacques made her professional theatrical debut as Josephine Jacques—adding a "c" to her birth name as she did so (Note: Her brother also changed his name at the same time.)—at the Players' Theatre, London, in a revue titled Late Joys. Almost immediately she became a regular performer with the company, appearing in music hall revues and playing the Fairy Queen in their Victorian-style pantomimes. Her biographer, Frances Gray, described the Players' as being Jacques's drama school, as she acted, directed, wrote lyrics and "developed the persona she was to use in pantomime for years, the large, bossy, but vulnerable fairy queen". It was whilst appearing in a Late Joys revue in June 1946 that she made her debut on television, when the show was broadcast on the BBC. Whilst appearing at the Players' in 1946 she acquired the nickname "Hattie" after performing in the minstrel show Coal Black Mammies for Dixie. A member of the backstage staff compared her "blacked up" appearance with the American actress Hattie McDaniel, known for her work in Gone with the Wind, and Jacques adopted the name for the rest of her life. (Note: Although Jacques confirmed this version of the origin of her name, another story was that the dancer and singer Josephine Gordon named Jacques as such after the musical Panama Hattie, while yet another version relates that she was given the name because of the extravagant hats she wore on stage at the Players'.)

"It was planned that I should play a character named 'Ella Phant'. Ted thought the laughs would come on the size gags but, being radio, and coupled with the fact my voice didn't have the timbre of a 'heavy', that didn't really work out ... A large lady with a little voice hit the spot, so 'Sophie Tuckshop' was born—the terrible child who never stopped eating".

— Jacques on her role in It's That Man Again

Jacques made her big-screen debut, briefly and uncredited, in the 1946 film Green for Danger, directed by Sidney Gilliat. In December that year, she joined the Young Vic Theatre Company and played Smeraldina in The King Stag. The play ran at the Lyric Theatre for a month before going on a five-month tour of the UK. It received favourable reviews; the Gloucestershire Echo described the piece as "a noble play", and thought that Jacques was "very solidly in step". In March 1947 Alberto Cavalcanti's film Nicholas Nickleby was released, in which Jacques had her first credited big-screen role as Mrs Kenwick. While engaged at the Players' in June 1947, Jacques was introduced to the actor John Le Mesurier and the two began a relationship. Le Mesurier was married but estranged from his wife.

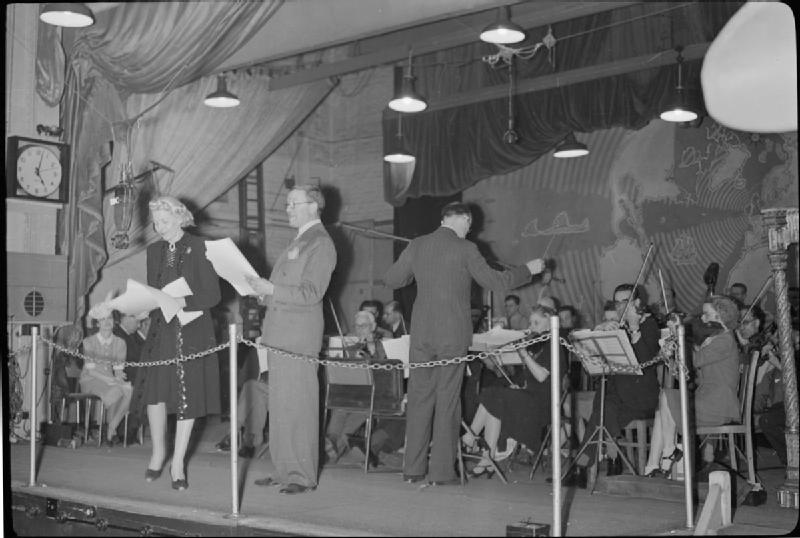
ITMA, during a wartime recording session

In August 1947 Ted Kavanagh, the scriptwriter of the BBC Home Service show It's That Man Again (ITMA), visited the Players' and invited Jacques to audition for the series, which she did on 18 September, for a fee of five guineas. She became so nervous during the audition that Tommy Handley, the show's star, held her hand, which she found made her more nervous. Jacques joined the cast of ITMA as the greedy schoolgirl Sophie Tuckshop, where she "would regale listeners with terrifying accounts of epic binges", before finishing her stories with the catchphrase "But I'm alright now". Jacques started her run in ITMA in September 1947, at the beginning of series eleven, which ran for 38 episodes, and was paid ten guineas per episode.

For much of 1948 Jacques continued to record episodes of ITMA for half the week, while spending evenings in the Players' Theatre; she also found time during the spring to record the role of Flora in No, No, Nanette for the BBC and appear at the Whitehall Theatre in Bates Wharf with the Under Thirty Theatre Group. Later that year she appeared as a singer at the Three Cripples tavern in the David Lean film Oliver Twist. In September she started recording her second series of ITMA—the show's twelfth—before returning to the Players' for the Christmas pantomime, The Sleeping Beauty in the Wood. In the latter performance, The Times commented that Jacques "must surely be among the funniest fairies" in her role as the Fairy Queen Antedota—which was one of her favourite parts.

Tommy Handley died suddenly on 9 January 1949; the BBC decided that he was "so much the keystone and embodiment of the actual performance" of ITMA, that they cancelled the show immediately. Jacques later remarked that Handley was "one of the greatest radio performers we have ever known. I learned ... so much from him". Later that year Le Mesurier divorced his wife; shortly after the divorce came through, Jacques proposed to him, asking, "don't you think it's about time we got married?" The couple wed on 10 November that year, at Kensington Registrar's Office. After a week's honeymoon in Southsea, she returned to the Players' where she was engaged to appear as Marrygolda in the Christmas pantomime Beauty and the Beast.

=== Increasing fame: 1950–1958 ===
In the early months of 1950 Chance of a Lifetime was released into British cinemas; it was a film in which Jacques "really made her mark", according to her biographer, Andy Merriman. Chance of a Lifetime is a social and industrial relations drama based in a plough factory whose manager cedes control to the workforce. Jacques played Alice, a welder: when she was offered her fee for 17 days' filming, she replied "I've done this job welding Bailey and Pontoon Bridges and I know how hard it is. That's not enough money!" and the offer was raised accordingly. The film critic Geoff Mayer considered that Jacques had "the best scene in the film with her mock seductive dance in front of an angry [Niall] MacGinnis".

On 6 June 1950 Jacques was cast in the first episode of the weekly radio show Educating Archie as Agatha Dinglebody. The "Archie" of the title was the ventriloquist's dummy Archie Andrews, operated by Peter Brough. The first series ran for 29 weeks until 19 December. In the show Jacques appeared alongside Max Bygraves, Julie Andrews, Beryl Reid and—in the second series—Tony Hancock. It was on this programme that she first worked with Eric Sykes, who was providing scripts for the series. Sykes had been impressed with Jacques since he visited the Players' in 1948. He later wrote that she "moved about the stage with an elegance and grace as if she owned it. At the end of her act, to great applause, she leapt in the air, finishing in the splits, landing as softly as a snowflake in July". After the show Sykes was introduced to Jacques backstage and thought that the meeting was "the beginning of a new flight" in his professional life. At the end of the series Jacques returned to the Players' to appear in the Christmas pantomime, Ali Baba and the Thirty-nine Thieves, which she and Joan Sterndale-Bennett had adapted after they had copied it out long-hand at the British Museum. The reviewer in The Times thought that Jacques was "as appealing as last year", in her performance as Ali Baba's wife, Cogia.

Throughout 1951 Jacques continued to mix work in different media, including appearing as Mrs Fezziwig in the film Scrooge starring Alastair Sim; from 3 August until 25 January 1952 she appeared in a second radio series of Educating Archie, as well as appearing in the related stage show, The Archie Andrews Christmas Show at the Prince of Wales Theatre from December 1952 to January 1953. She again appeared in—and co-adapted—a Christmas pantomime at the Players' Theatre, Riquet with the Tuft, a French fairy tale by Charles Perrault. (Note: Her other appearances included on radio, with Calling All Forces, Fine Goings On and Further Goings On; on stage she also appeared with the Players' in Apartments, The Crystal Palace—1851 and Going Up.) In 1952 Jacques also portrayed Mrs Jenks in John Gilling's comedy horror film Mother Riley Meets the Vampire, co-starring Arthur Lucan and Bela Lugosi.

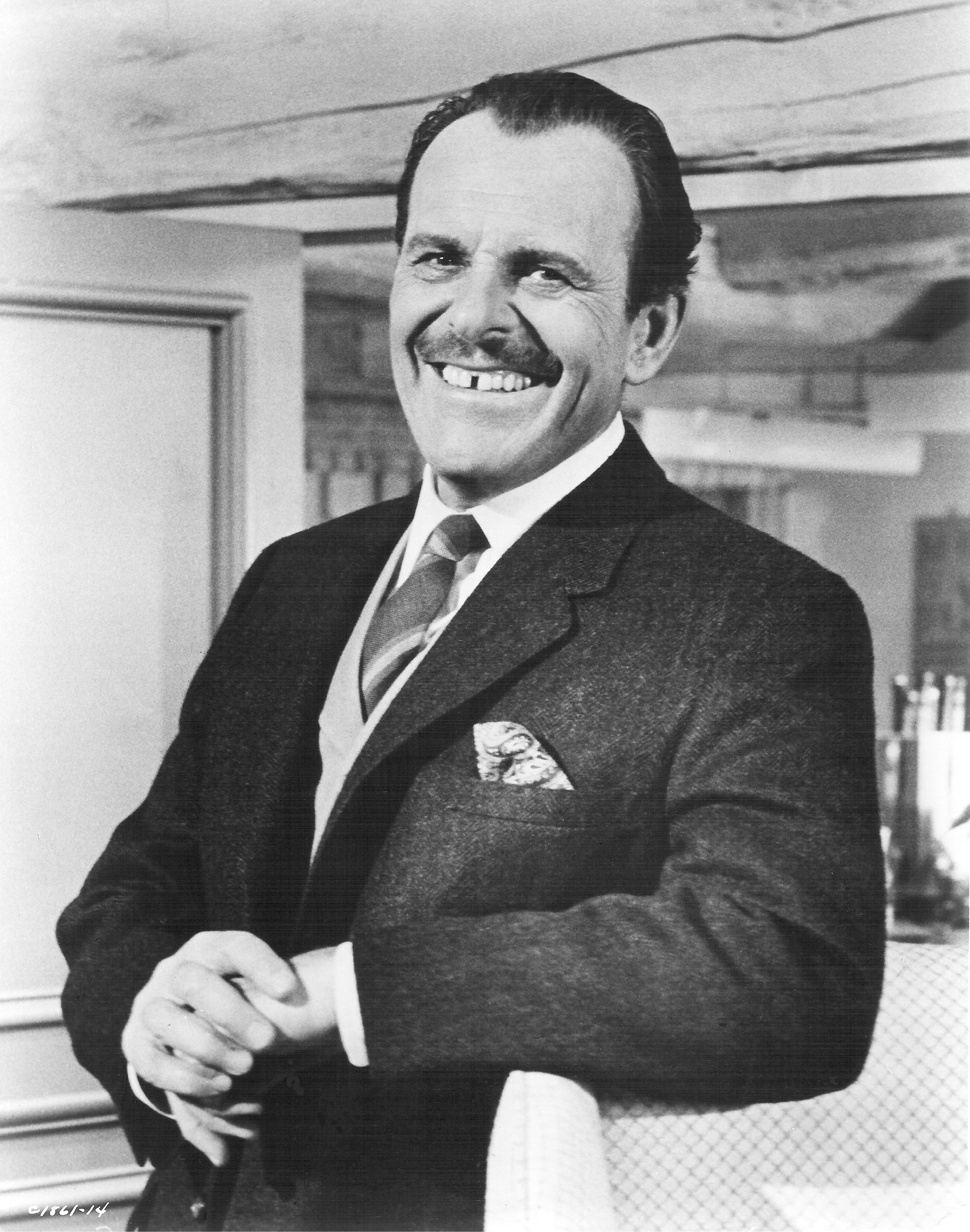
Terry-Thomas, with whom Jacques appeared on stage and in film

Jacques became pregnant in 1952, but worked through most of her pregnancy, appearing in the Players' revue The Bells of St Martins between August and November 1952: she slid down the table and did the splits at the end—something The Times thought was "especially good", although The Manchester Guardian considered that she was "monumental of person but surprisingly thin of voice". Le Mesurier reported that he was "faintly relieved" when the revue came to an end because of her exertions, added to which she appeared in the 27 episodes of the third series of Educating Archie between September 1952 and June 1953. (Note: The series was split into two parts: 18 September 1952 – 12 February 1953 and 21 May – 26 June 1953) She then directed—but did not appear in—the Players' Christmas pantomime of 1952, Babes in the Wood. In March 1953 Jacques gave birth to her first son, Robin, and returned to work after a few days to film Up to His Neck. Later that year she provided the lead alongside Le Mesurier in the 38-minute "movie-masque" The Pleasure Garden; filmed in 1952, it won the Prix de Fantasie Poétique at the 1954 Cannes Film Festival. From October until April 1954 she was in series four of Educating Archie, while in December 1953 she also appeared in and directed Cinderella at the Players'; The Times commented that "Miss Jacques as actress, playing a deliciously arch and absent-minded Fairy Queen, goes a long way to retrieve the failure of Miss Jacques as dramatist".

In 1954 Jacques continued to work on radio. Between April and July she was in Paradise Street, a spin-off series from Educating Archie, while in June she was in Archie in Goonland, a one-off special programme that was a collaboration between Educating Archie and The Goon Show. (Note: The programme was also the first collaboration between the two writers Eric Sykes and Spike Milligan.) As well as recording in series five of Educating Archie, she was also cast as Mrs Leathers for 18 episodes of Mrs Dale's Diary between February and April 1955. She both produced and directed Twenty Minutes South, first at the Players' Theatre, and then for 105 performances at the St Martin's Theatre and finished the year by appearing in seven episodes of The Granville Melodramas on ITV between October and December.

A second pregnancy led to the birth of a son, Kim, "who came rollicking and laughing into the world in October 1956, a trifle before his allotted time", according to Le Mesurier. In June 1956 Jacques appeared in an episode of The Tony Hancock Show on ITV; this led to the role of Hancock's secretary, Griselda Pugh, in the BBC radio series Hancock's Half Hour. She appeared in 16 episodes from November 1956 to February 1957, alongside Hancock and regulars Sidney James, Bill Kerr and Kenneth Williams. (Note: Jacques joined as part of the storyline of episode five of the fourth series of the radio programme.) Jacques's arrival on Hancock "provided an additional boost to the series", according to television historian Richard Webber. She appeared again in five further episodes of Hancock's Half Hour between April and June 1957, and again for a further 20 episodes between January and June 1958, before a special edition on Christmas Day 1958. She spent much of 1958 at the London Palladium, undertaking 380 performances of the revue Large as Life, alongside Terry-Thomas, Eric Sykes and Harry Secombe. She appeared in the sketches "Concerto for Three Buffoons" with Secombe and Sykes, "The Good Old Days", and the two full company numbers that closed each of the two halves of the show.

=== The Carry On series: 1958–1963 ===
When the first Carry On film was made in 1958, Jacques formed part of the cast. This series would go on to employ the same group of actors who would collectively become known as the "Carry On team". Jacques appeared in 14 of these films over a 15-year period and like many of her Carry On co-stars, she quickly became typecast. A recurring role for Jacques was a no-nonsense matron which she played in five of the films – Carry On Nurse, Carry On Doctor, Carry On Again Doctor, Carry On Camping and Carry On Matron. She became known by the team as a "Mother Hen" figure, and was a close friend to many of her co-stars, including Kenneth Williams and Joan Sims, whom Jacques provided with a great deal of advice and practical help. In return, Sims regarded Jacques as her "greatest friend", and as "both a sister and a mother to me". Jacques would frequently invite Sims, Williams and Charles Hawtrey to her house for Christmas dinner.

Jacques began her association with the Carry On series in March 1958 with the first film in the series, Carry On Sergeant. She played the small role of Captain Clark, a "battleaxe medical officer" who fails to believe the fabricated ailments of the hypochondriac Private Horace Strong, played by Kenneth Connor. The following year she played "Matron" for the first time in Carry On Nurse, a film which broke that year's box office records, selling more than 10 million tickets in British cinemas. Although Jacques's role was still relatively small, she appeared in perhaps the best known scene of the film, in which she retrieves a daffodil from Wilfrid Hyde-White's buttocks, put there by a mischievous nurse as revenge for his constant harassment of the staff. So popular was Jacques's scene, that the producers imported two million plastic daffodils from Japan which were then used to promote the comedy. Other characterisations followed, including the formidable maths mistress Grace Short in Carry On Teacher (1959) and the friendly Police Sergeant Laura Moon in Carry On Constable (1960). Of the former film, Derek Prouse of The Sunday Times thought that Jacques "triumph[ed] over material so remorselessly juvenile that one is battered into a kind of fascinated admiration".

On 29 January 1960 Jacques appeared in the first episode of the BBC comedy series Sykes and a..., co-starring with Eric Sykes as a pair of twins; Richard Wattis and Deryck Guyler were also regulars in the cast. (Note: Wattis's role, Charles Brown, was originally offered to Le Mesurier, but he turned down the role as he wanted "to make it on ... [his] own" without his wife's help.) Jacques's character—Hattie (Hat) Sykes—was "a middle-class, slightly pretentious lady struggling to keep her dignity as the men made fools of themselves". Sykes and a... went on to run for sixty episodes over nine series during the next five years. According to the media historian Graham McCann, the show was "one of the best-natured, least pretentious and most successful British sitcoms of the 1960s". Because of the success, Jacques and Sykes "became embedded in the public mind as a priceless comic partnership"; to capitalise, they released a comedy album entitled Eric and Hattie and Things!!!, but it failed to chart. In September 1960 she starred in her second television series, Our House, alongside Hawtrey, Bernard Bresslaw and Joan Sims; Jacques played the librarian Georgina Ruddy, who was forced to keep quiet at work and so made up for it by being extremely noisy at home. (Note: The first series ran until December 1960; a second series ran from September 1961 to April 1962.) Later that year she played minor roles in two films: Watch Your Stern, with many of the Carry On regulars, and School for Scoundrels, opposite Ian Carmichael. After these her screen time increased with the part of Nanette Parry in Make Mine Mink in which she co-starred with Terry-Thomas and Athene Seyler. She later described this as her favourite film.

In October 1961 Jacques appeared on Desert Island Discs, and said that she would be too lonely on such a quiet island for someone of her temperament. (Note: The programme was broadcast on 16 October 1961; her full choice was Ludwig van Beethoven's Symphony No. 9 in D minor ("Choral") – Robert Shaw Chorale and the NBC Symphony Orchestra, conducted by Arturo Toscanini; Duke Ellington's "Hello Little Girl" – Ellington and his Orchestra; George Frideric Handel's "Let the bright Seraphim" from Samson – Joan Sutherland and the orchestra of the Royal Opera House; Johann Sebastian Bach's "Fugue in A minor" – Stuttgart Chamber Orchestra; Tommy Dorsey's version of On the Sunny Side of the Street; The Modern Jazz Quartet's version of "God Rest You Merry, Gentlemen"; Peter Sellers's recording of "Lord Badminton's Memoirs"; and Judy Garland and the Gordon Jenkins Orchestra with "The Red Balloon". Her chosen book was The Oxford Dictionary of Quotations and her luxury item was a photograph and recording of her family.) By this time Carry On had become a leading film franchise, with the author Robert Ross describing it as a "phenomenon". That year's film, Carry On Regardless, was the fifth in the series; Jacques received a fee of £100 for the small role of a disgruntled hospital sister, who appeared briefly on screen alongside the English character actor Kynaston Reeves. Jacques was initially intended for a major part in the film, but she was unable to commit to a longer role because of ill health. She appeared in her sixth Carry On, Carry On Cabby, in 1963, as "Peggy Hawkins", the emotionally neglected wife of taxi-firm boss "Charlie", played by Sid James. Jacques later named the film as her favourite of the series, as she was allowed to drop her "battleaxe" persona and play the romantic lead opposite James.

=== Private turmoil; new acting ventures: 1963–1967 ===
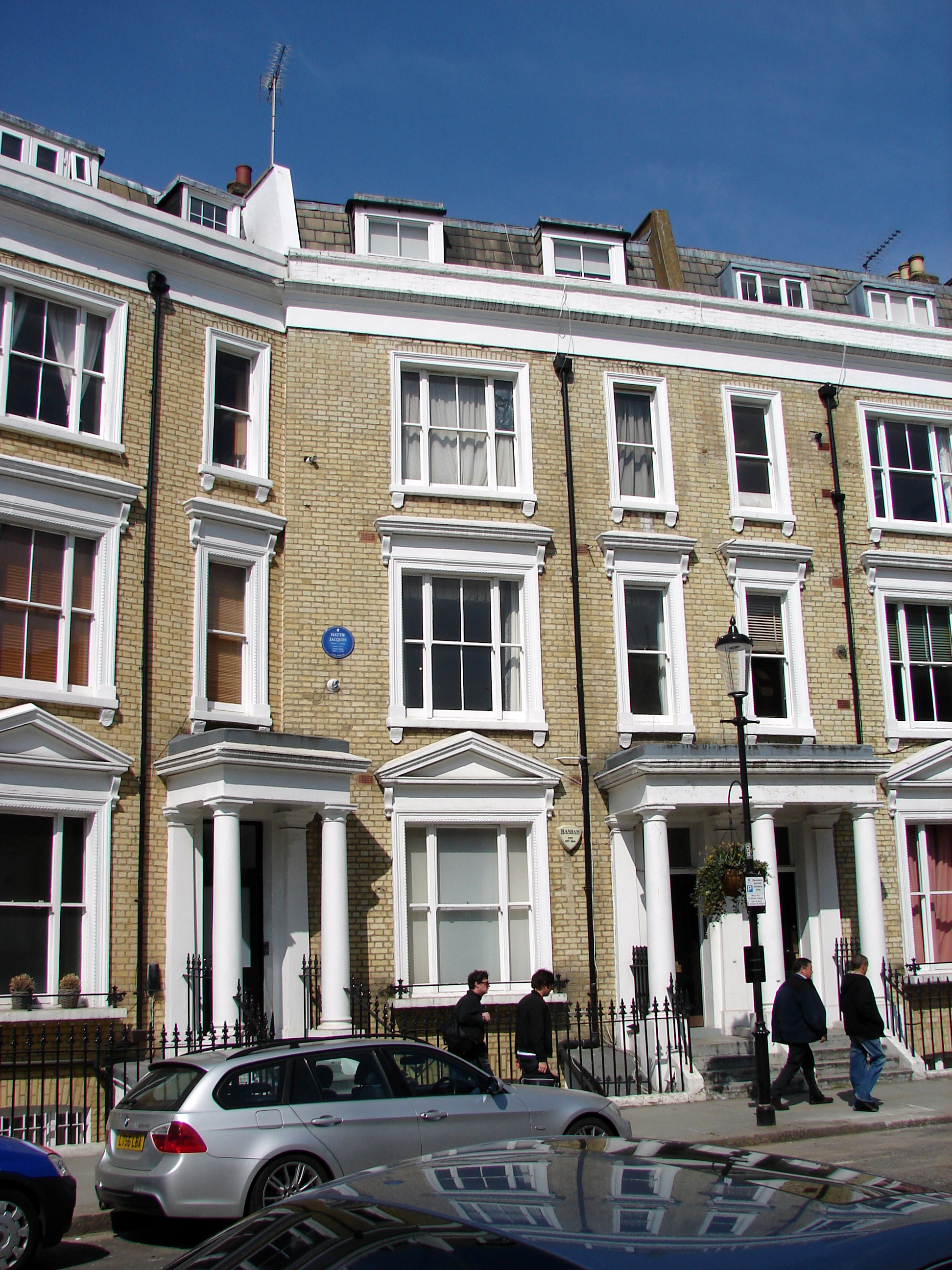
Jacques's house, 67 Eardley Crescent, Earls Court, London

Jacques's private life became complicated in 1963. The previous year she had met John Schofield, a cockney used-car dealer, who chauffeured her to a Leukaemia Research Fund event. The couple became romantically involved after the driver gave her the attention and support that Le Mesurier did not. When Jacques decided to move Schofield into the family home, Le Mesurier moved into a separate room. He later commented about this period: "I could have walked out, but, whatever my feelings, I loved Hattie and the children and I was certain—I had to be certain—that we could repair the damage". During these upheavals in her personal life, Jacques was surprised to be the subject of This Is Your Life in February 1963, when she was approached by Eamonn Andrews during rehearsal for the sixth series of Sykes and a.... Although Le Mesurier did not mention the marital situation when being questioned by Andrews, he made the comment that for Jacques "the home comes first", which Merriman considered had been said "rather pointedly". Despite the matrimonial upsets, Jacques and Le Mesurier both appeared in the 1963 Tony Hancock film, The Punch and Judy Man. In 1964 Le Mesurier moved out of the marital home, made a decision to protect Jacques from any negative publicity, and allowed her to bring a divorce suit on grounds of his own infidelity. This ensured that the press blamed him for the break-up, casting Jacques as the victim in the matter.

In 1964, as well as recording four episodes of the radio show Housewives' Choice, Jacques starred in her own television series, Miss Adventure, as the private investigator Stacey Smith. Although Jacques wanted the series to be full of suspense, the programmes were more comedic and she was disappointed with the results. In August that year she appeared as Madame Arcati in an ITV production of Blithe Spirit. The play's writer, Noël Coward, felt that "finally someone had delivered a performance that wasn't overshadowed by Margaret Rutherford", who had originated the stage role in 1940 and played it in the 1945 film version. (Note: Between 1964 and 1967 Jacques continued to regularly appear on television, in a range of largely comedy programmes that included series eight and nine of Sykes and a... in late 1964 and late 1965, respectively; an episode of Cribbins, Bernard Cribbins's sketch show; ten episodes of the children's programme Jackanory between January 1966 and February 1967; Titipu (a re-working of The Mikado); as Helen in the drama "The Memorandum" for the Theatre 625 series on BBC; and Sykes Versus ITV in November 1967.)

Jacques went to Rome in 1966 to film The Bobo with Peter Sellers; before this she went on a strict diet and lost five stone (32 kg), although she was disappointed that so few people noticed. She enjoyed the filming experience, calling it "one of the loveliest things I've worked on". While she was in Italy, Schofield came out to stay, started an affair with an Italian heiress and broke off his relationship with Jacques; deeply upset, Jacques, who had had a weight problem since her teens, began eating comfort food and her weight increased to nearly 20 stone (127 kg).

=== Return to Carry On: 1967–1974 ===
In the summer of 1967 the Carry On producer Peter Rogers assembled the cast for the 15th film of the series, Carry On Doctor. Rogers initially chose Joan Sims to play the role of the hospital matron but she declined the part, stating that Jacques's performance of the role in Carry On Nurse could not be bettered. As such, Rogers cast Jacques as Matron, with Sims accepting a smaller role as the timid assistant of the film's lead character Francis Bigger, played by Frankie Howerd. Jacques's screen time was increased from Carry On Nurse, as the producers considered her part to be an extension of the earlier role. Carry On Doctor was released in December of that year, to much success.

Jacques started 1968 by appearing with Spike Milligan and Frank Thornton in thirteen episodes of the sketch show The World of Beachcomber, based on the Beachcomber column in the Daily Express newspaper and broadcast on the BBC from January to April. Shortly after the series finished, she appeared alongside Frankie Howerd in his sketch show, Howerd's Hour, on ITV. She continued her busy schedule with appearances in six films for 1969, (Note: The six films were Rhubarb, Monte Carlo or Bust!, Carry On Camping, Carry On Again Doctor, Crooks and Coronets and The Magic Christian.) including another with Sellers, The Magic Christian. Here she portrayed a character named Ginger, who was described as a "grotesque figure", with an "insatiable lust for bestsellers on the atrocities of World War Two". She also appeared on television alongside Harry Secombe and Roy Castle in Pickwick, which was based on the musical of the same name, and in Carry On Christmas, broadcast on Christmas Eve. Although 1969 had been busy, 1970 was relatively quiet in terms of her professional output: apart from an episode of Catweazle, she appeared alongside Willoughby Goddard in a six-episode series of Charley's Grants. She spent May and June filming Carry On Loving, in which she played Sophie Bliss, released in September that year. Another Carry On film followed in 1971, Carry On at Your Convenience, where she played Beattie Plummer, the housebound wife of Sid Plummer, played by Sid James. In the same year she completed another series with Sykes, Sykes and a Big, Big Show, a music and sketch programme which had six episodes, broadcast between February and April. (Note: During the course of the year Jacques also appeared with Sykes in the on-off programme Sykes – With the Lid Off, as well as making one-off appearances in Frankie Howerd: The Laughing Stock of Television, Doctor at Large, Ask Aspel, Dangerpoint and Christmas Night with the Stars.)

Two further Carry On films followed for Jacques in 1972: Carry On Matron, for which she was engaged in the title role, and Carry On Abroad, as Floella, the fiery Spanish cook at a half-finished hotel. For the latter work Jacques spent only a week filming her scenes. During post-production, the film's insurers became concerned about Jacques's deteriorating health. In a letter to the series producer Peter Rogers, they expressed their reluctance to insure her on set in any future film. (Note: Her last film would be Carry On Dick in 1974, in which she appeared as Martha Hoggett.)

During the course of 1972 Jacques co-starred in the first series of Sykes, in which she played Hattie Sykes, "the wide-eyed, less-knowing but remarkably patient sister-cum-mother-figure"; (Note: Sykes was an extension to the earlier series Sykes and a.... In total there were seven series and two Christmas specials of Sykes, ending in November 1979.) at its height, Sykes had 17 million viewers. In February 1972 Jacques was at home with her son Robin to watch Le Mesurier win the British Academy of Film and Television Arts "Best Television Actor" award for his portrayal of a "boozy British aristocrat ... who became a spy for the Soviets" in Dennis Potter's television play Traitor. Jacques cried when her ex-husband won the award, and divulged to her son that she "wasn't crying out of professional resentment or even envy about Joan Le Mesurier ... but from an unhappiness that, through her own actions, she lost John or there was now no-one with whom to spend her life".

=== After Carry On: 1974–1980 ===
==== Final appearances ====
In 1974 Jacques's sons were arrested for possession of cannabis, and her house was searched by police. In the same week that the two boys appeared in court, she received official notification of the intention to appoint her as an OBE. In order to protect her sons from further press intrusion she declined the honour. (Note: Robin and Kim Le Mesurier were both fined £20 for the charge of the drugs possession.) Later that year, while filming the third series of Sykes, she suffered a cancer scare and lost a considerable amount of weight. Despite this she refused to interrupt the busy production schedule; when filming was completed on 5 December she underwent surgery at Charing Cross Hospital for what proved to be benign tumours on her kidneys.

In 1976 Jacques appeared in a promotional advertising film for British Rail, which pitted her against racing driver Jackie Stewart in a race to London. From 1976 onwards Sykes and Jacques appeared together in the stage play A Hatful of Sykes, both in the UK and internationally. (Note: The play ran intermittently from 1976 to September 1979 at various places in the UK (including seasons at Torquay, Lincoln, Blackpool and Bournemouth; a UK national tour; and an international tour that included Hong Kong (February – March 1977), Rhodesia (April – May 1978), Canada (December 1978 – January 1979) and South Africa (February – March 1979).) During the course of the different tours, relations between the two stars became increasingly strained and Sykes altered the act several times to ensure he received more acclaim than Jacques. Whilst appearing in Blackpool in 1977 Jacques's health became problematic as she suffered from arthritis and ulcerated legs, which required daily dressing. Because a dressing room was arranged that avoided her needing to use stairs, Sykes accused her of receiving special treatment. When the show moved to Rhodesia (now Zimbabwe), Sykes "began to behave rather strangely ... and he even accused Hattie ... of not being able to deliver a proper feed line". By the time the show appeared in Brighton in 1979 the relationship between the two "was rapidly deteriorating", and, although the pair praised each other in public, Jacques felt hurt by Sykes's treatment of her. Despite the differences, the pair filmed the seventh series of Sykes in 1979, and—in April 1980—the television film Rhubarb Rhubarb; although her part was a small one, she looked "a little unsteady on her feet", according to Merriman. (Note: Rhubarb Rhubarb was broadcast on ITV on 15 December 1980, two months after Jacques's death.)

=== Death and tributes ===
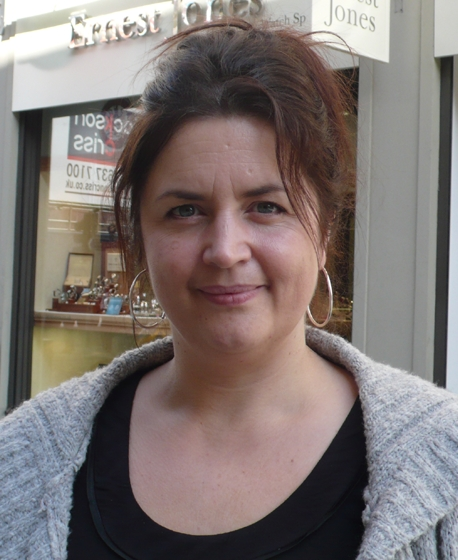
Ruth Jones, who portrayed Jacques in Hattie

In May 1980 Jacques's doctor advised her against travelling to Greece on holiday as planned, so she visited Ireland instead. During the return ferry crossing she told her friend Bruce Copp that "You know I'm not going to live long". Her health remained poor, and insurance companies refused to insure her for film work. By October her weight had risen again; she had problems breathing and was again admitted to Charing Cross Hospital. She took a weekend break from hospital and returned home to Eardley Crescent, where on 6 October she died from a heart attack in her sleep aged 58; she was also suffering from kidney failure.

Jacques's funeral took place at Putney Vale Crematorium, where her ashes were scattered. Her sons refused to allow Sykes entry to the funeral because they resented the way he had treated her during the stage show; Sykes was upset by the exclusion and failed to understand why he had been banned. The other notable absentee from the funeral was Joan Sims, who "stayed in her home and spent the day drinking, reading old letters from Hattie and wallowing in self pity", according to Merriman.

Kenneth Williams was deeply saddened by the loss of his friend, and wrote that "all the chums have died ... one is left marooned on the shore ... the tide is receding and leaving some incongruous wrecks exposed ... I fear I am one of them". John Le Mesurier described Jacques as "a remarkable lady ... [who] had an aura of love and kindness about her", while her obituary in The Times observed that "she will be remembered with affection by all who saw her". A month after the funeral, a memorial service was held at St Paul's, Covent Garden, otherwise known as the Actors' Church, which was described by Le Mesurier as a "joyous occasion".

A memorial plaque to Jacques is situated in St Paul's, Covent Garden. In November 1995 a blue plaque was unveiled by Eric Sykes and Clive Dunn—a colleague from her Players' Theatre days—at her former house: 67 Eardley Crescent, Earls Court, London. In 2002 plaques were unveiled for Jacques, Sid James and Tony Hancock at BBC Broadcasting House in London.

In 2011 Jacques and Le Mesurier's marriage was the subject of a BBC Four biographical film called Hattie, which focused on Jacques's affair with John Schofield. She was played by Ruth Jones, who Robin Le Mesurier thought "had captured my mother perfectly". Jones was thrilled at playing Jacques whom she considered to be her comedy heroine, describing her as an "incredibly talented and fascinating woman both on and off screen".

== Reputation ==
"I don't like playing battleaxes, I want to feel protected like any other woman. I'm just a helpless little kitten. I'm pathologically shy".

— Jacques, on herself

The writer Susan Leckey described Jacques as "one of the best-loved British comedy stars", while Jacques's obituarist in The Times observed that "she was invariably successful" at making people "laugh with, rather than at you". Peter Chapman of The Independent stated that Jacques was "blessed with remarkable grace, delicacy and warmth, giving her an almost unique comic appeal". Sunday Life said that for decades she was "Britain's favourite silly, sexually frustrated, fat woman". Nina Wadia of Goodness Gracious Me considers Jacques along with Joan Sims and Barbara Windsor to have "paved the way for younger comediennes in Britain today", remarking that "if it had not been for women like Hattie and Barbara, there is no way that younger actresses would have any role model, or probably the ambition to do what they do".

Jacques's biographer, Frances Gray, highlighted two aspects of the actress's abilities; in her appearances in the sequence of post-war Dickens adaptations (Nicholas Nickleby, Oliver Twist, Scrooge and Pickwick) Jacques "reflected her talent for larger-than-life comedy which never lost its grip on humanity", while in other films, such as Mother Riley Meets the Vampire, she displayed "a broader comic mode". In her later career Jacques showed "a comic talent of extraordinary versatility. In Sykes her performance had to be a foil for the main character; in the Carry Ons she blossomed". As a singer she was also praised; Jonathan Cecil of The Spectator said that her "bell-tone voice with its cut-crystal diction—perfect for radio—had an edge of pain which suggested a greater depth to her talents than she was generally allowed to express". The actor Neville Phillips, who toured with Jacques, described her as having a "pretty voice" and able to "take an innocuous old Victorian or Edwardian ballad and with just a few intonations and expressions give it another meaning entirely".

Hospital matrons continue to be closely associated with Jacques, who first played the role in Carry On Nurse (1959).

Gray observes that "Jacques is enduringly associated with the role of hospital matron" and her portrayal of the character in five films had a lasting impact on both her legacy and on the role and view of Matrons in the National Health Service. An article in The Guardian by Mark Lawson mixed fiction with reality when he wrote that "standards of hygiene have slipped since Hattie Jacques ran NHS wards". According to The Scotsman, the 2003 Labour Party Conference "applauded deliriously because the government has revived Hattie Jacques", in relation to a change in government policy. After complaints about the NHS in 2008, the Western Morning News suggested the government should "clone a Hattie Jacques-type matron to run a tight ship everywhere". NHS nurses have complained about the stereotype: in August 2013 the Nursing Times quoted one matron, who protested that they were "not like Hattie Jacques anymore".

Alan Simpson, the co-writer of Hancock, enjoyed writing for Jacques, and thought that she was "almost like a fella in terms of playing comedy; you didn't write for her thinking she's a woman so we've got to write the feminine point of view. That made it easier for us". Neville Phillips thought she was a "complete revelation", adding "although she was a large lady (very large, in fact), her movements were dainty, light and graceful, and she had a way of playing comedy that put me in mind of the great Beatrice Lillie ... a subtle, sophisticated actress". Her friend Bob Monkhouse thought that her career was overshadowed by her size: "She was such a great comedienne ... everyone wanted her but the movers and shakers of entertainment didn't perceive her as anything other than a fat lady". Garth Pearce, writing in the Daily Express, noted that "she always chose to play women in funny situations, rather than refer directly to her weight. She concentrated on the script and its interpretation instead of winning easy laughs by playing 'the fattie'." The approach of writers differed in how they dealt with the characters they asked Jacques to portray. Morwenna Banks and Amanda Swift consider Jacques to have been "unimaginatively cast as the 'fat person'" in ITMA, while in Sykes, her weight was rarely referred to—and Jacques said that Sykes "hardly ever made jokes about my size which was a refreshing change". Gray considers that "although often cast in broad comedy, she never played it broadly, but with an elegance of voice and body that belied all the clichés about women and weight".

== Credits ==
- Hattie Jacques on stage, radio, screen and record

== Sources ==
- Banks, Morwenna; Swift, Amanda (1987). The Joke's on Us: Women in Comedy from Music Hall to the Present Day. London: Pandora Press. ISBN 978-0-86358-196-0.
- Barfe, Louis (2009). Turned Out Nice Again: the story of British light entertainment. London: Atlantic Books. ISBN 978-1-84354-380-0.
- Briggs, Asa (1961). The History of Broadcasting in the United Kingdom. Oxford: Oxford University Press. ISBN 978-0-19-212967-3.
- Debenham, Warren (1988). Laughter on record: a comedy discography. Lanham, MD: Scarecrow Press. ISBN 978-0-8108-2094-4.
- "The Magic Christian". Films and Filming. 16. London: Hansom Books: 43. 1969.
- Foster, Andy; Furst, Steve (1999). Radio Comedy, 1938–1968: A Guide to 30 Years of Wonderful Wireless. London: Virgin Books. ISBN 978-0-86369-960-3.
- Gifford, Denis (1978). The Illustrated Who's Who in British Films. London: B.T. Batsford. ISBN 978-0-7134-1434-9.
- Gifford, Denis (1985). The Golden Age of Radio: an illustrated companion. London: Batsford Books. ISBN 978-0-7134-4234-2.
- Goddard, Simon (24 April 2012). Mozipedia: The Encyclopaedia of Morrissey and the Smiths. London: Ebury Publishing. ISBN 978-1-4070-2884-2.
- Gray, Frances (2004). "Jacques, Josephine Edwina (Hattie) (1922–1980)". Oxford Dictionary of National Biography (online ed.). Oxford University Press. doi:10.1093/ref:odnb/53976. (Subscription, Wikipedia Library access or UK public library membership required.)
- Hartley, Cathy (2013). A Historical Dictionary of British Women. London: Routledge. ISBN 978-1-135-35534-0.
- Herbert, Ian (1978). Who's Who in the Theatre: a Biographical Record of the Contemporary Stage. London: Pitman Publishing. ISBN 978-0-273-01195-8.
- Joyce, Michael (2004). Football League Players' Records 1888 to 1939. Nottingham: SoccerData (Tony Brown). ISBN 978-1-899468-67-6.
- Kavanagh, Ted (1970). The ITMA Years. London: Woburn Press. ISBN 978-0-7130-0101-3.
- Leckey, Susan (2013). "Jacques, Hattie (1924–80)". In Hartley, Cathy (ed.). A Historical Dictionary of British Women. London: Routledge. ISBN 978-1-135-35534-0.
- Le Mesurier, John (1984). A Jobbing Actor. London: Sphere Books. ISBN 978-0-7221-6032-9.
- Lewisohn, Mark (1998). Radio Times Guide to TV Comedy. London: BBC Books. ISBN 978-0-563-36977-6.
- London. London: Time Out. 2003. ISBN 978-0-14-100840-0.
- Mayer, Geoff (2003). Guide to British Cinema. Westport, CT: Greenwood Press. ISBN 978-0-313-30307-4.
- McCann, Graham (2007). Spike & Co. London: Hodder & Stoughton. ISBN 978-0-340-89810-9.
- McCann, Graham (2010). Do You Think That's Wise? The life of John Le Mesurier. London: Aurum Press. ISBN 978-1-84513-583-6.
- Merriman, Andy (2007). Hattie: The Authorised Biography of Hattie Jacques. London: Aurum Press. ISBN 978-1-84513-257-6.
- Phillips, Neville (2008). The Stage Struck Me!. Leicester: Troubador Publishing Ltd. ISBN 978-1-906510-43-5.
- Rhodes, Gary Don (2006). Lugosi: His Life in Films, on Stage, and in the Hearts of Horror Lovers. Jefferson, NC: McFarland & Company. ISBN 978-0-7864-2765-9.
- Roberts, Jerry (2009). Encyclopedia of Television Film Directors. Plymouth, Devon: Scarecrow Press. ISBN 978-0-8108-6138-1.
- Ross, Robert (1996). The Carry On Companion. London: Batsford. ISBN 978-0-7134-8771-8.
- Ross, Robert (2001). The Complete Frankie Howerd. London: Reynolds & Hearn. ISBN 978-1-903111-08-6.
- Ross, Robert (2005). The Carry On Story. London: Reynolds and Hearn. ISBN 978-1-903111-96-3.
- Sheridan, Paul (1952). Late and Early Joys at the Players' Theatre. London: T.V. Boardman. OCLC 504084581.
- Sims, Joan (2000). High Spirits. London: Transworld Publishers. ISBN 978-0-552-14763-7.
- Snelgrove, Kevin (2003). The Carry On Book of Statistics. Somerset: KAS Publications. ISBN 978-0-9544200-0-0.
- Stevens, Christopher (2010). Born Brilliant: The Life of Kenneth Williams. London: John Murray. ISBN 978-1-84854-195-5.
- Sykes, Eric (2003). Eric Sykes' Comedy Heroes. London: Virgin Books. ISBN 978-0-7535-0966-1.
- Sykes, Eric (2005). If I Don't Do It Someone Else Will: An Autobiography. London: HarperCollins. ISBN 978-0-00-717784-4.
- Took, Barry (2004). "Handley, Thomas Reginald (Tommy) (1892–1949)". Oxford Dictionary of National Biography (online ed.). Oxford University Press. doi:10.1093/ref:odnb/33682. (Subscription, Wikipedia Library access or UK public library membership required.)
- Webber, Richard (2004). Fifty Years of Hancock's Half Hour. London: Random House. ISBN 978-1-4464-0998-5.
- Webber, Richard (2008). 50 Years of Carry On. London: Arrow. ISBN 978-0-09-949007-4.
