= Deryck Guyler =

English actor (1914–1999)

- Born: Deryck Bower Guyler; 29 April 1914; Wallasey, Cheshire, England
- Died: 7 October 1999 (aged 85); Ashgrove, Queensland, Australia
- Occupation: Actor
- Years active: 1945-1999
- Spouse: Margaret Mary McConnell (a.k.a. "Paddy Lennox") (m. 1941)
- Children: 2

Deryck Bower Guyler (29 April 1914 – 7 October 1999) was an English actor, best remembered for appearances in sitcoms such as Please Sir! and Sykes.

== Early life ==
Guyler was born in Wallasey on the Wirral Peninsula, Cheshire, the son of Samuel Phipps Guyler, a jeweller, and Elsie Evelyn, née Bower. In his childhood, a next-door neighbour was Irené Eastwood, who would also go on to have a career in show business when she changed her name to Anne Ziegler – the 1921 census shows the Eastwood family at 111 Hartington Rd, Liverpool and the Guylers at 113. He attended Liverpool College and originally planned a career in the Church of England, having studied theology for a year. In the 1930s, he joined the Liverpool Repertory Theatre and performed in numerous productions. During the Second World War, he was called up and joined the RAF Police but was later invalided from service, whereupon he joined Entertainments National Service Association (ENSA) and then, in 1942, the BBC's Drama and Repertory company.

== Career ==
From 1946, Guyler became a regular on the immensely popular radio series, It's That Man Again (ITMA), a series built around comedian Tommy Handley. Guyler claimed that his character 'Frisby Dike' (named after a Liverpool department store bombed in the Blitz) was the first time the real Liverpudlian accent was heard on the radio. He took part in a Royal Command Performance of ITMA for King George VI and Queen Elizabeth in December 1947. Guyler remained with the show until Handley died in 1949 when the series ended.

After ITMA, Guyler worked in roles from the BBC's Children's Hour to classical parts, including with John Gielgud in King Lear. He was known for his often amusing asides in rehearsals. For a Children's Hour documentary about life in the coal mines, which Guyler was narrating, the producer had visited a mine and recorded most-realistic sound effects. As these were banging, crashing and thumping sounds he was heard to mutter: "Sounds like a Peter Brook production".

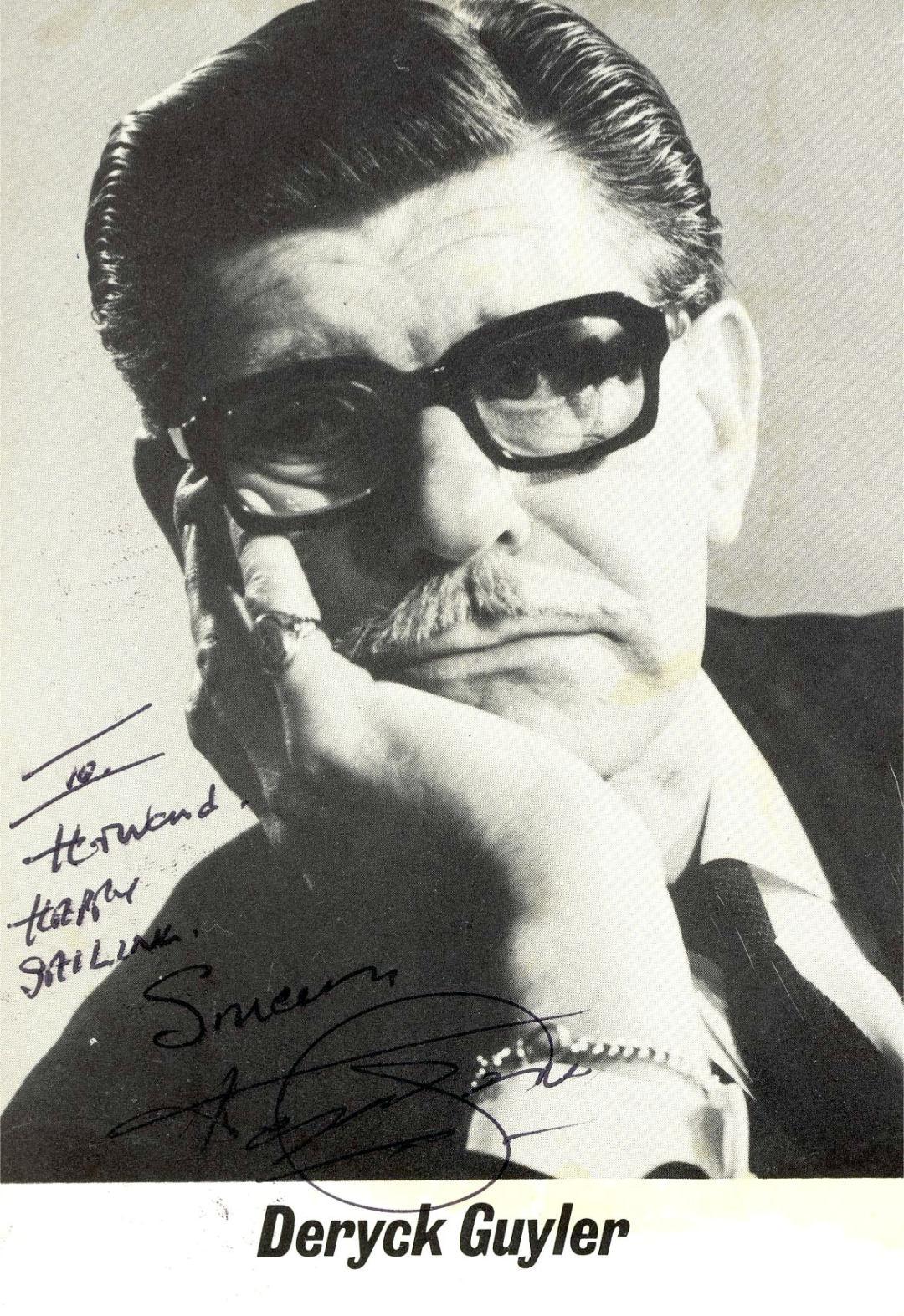
Deryck Guyler's autograph, signed in 1976

In the 1950s, he played the time-traveller (also known as "the voice") in the British sci-fi radio series Journey into Space. In the same period, he was on the radio series Just Fancy for 9 years which starred Eric Barker. Guyler took on the role in the title character of a Scotland Yard detective in the Light Programme series Inspector Scott Investigates, created by John P. Wynn, that ran from 1957 to 1963. During the half-hour programme a crime was committed; Scott and his sidekick, Det. Sgt. Bingham (Brian Hayes, brother of Patricia Hayes) interviewed two or three suspects; then, while music played, there was a short intermission for listeners to guess 'whodunit' before the final revelation. In Henry Reed's series of radio dramas about Herbert Reeve's inquiries into the life of Richard Shewin, Guyler played General Gland, soldier-scholar, campanologist and author of war memoirs, including in Not a Drum was Heard. During the 1960s and 1970s, he starred in the satirical radio programme about life in the British civil service The Men from the Ministry with Richard Murdoch. He was in the series for 11 years. Guyler played the pompous, self-important Number One in the General Assistance Department, with Murdoch as his diffident but equally incompetent Number Two. He played solicitor Mr. Brown in the 1978 radio series Share and Share Alike.

He appeared as the Police Sergeant in the Beatles' film A Hard Day's Night (1964) and as the art professor in the Gerry & the Pacemakers film Ferry Cross the Mersey (1965).

Guyler holds a unique place in theatrical history, having 'acted' in every performance of The Mousetrap since the opening night on 6 October 1952 in Nottingham, via a recorded news bulletin which is still being used during performances of the play at St Martin's Theatre, London.

== Television ==
One of Guyler's first television appearances was as the manager of a TV repair shop in Three Live Wires in 1961, followed closely by his television success as one of Michael Bentine's sidekicks in the surreal BBC show It's a Square World (1961), but he gained greater recognition on the small screen in his association with comedian and writer Eric Sykes. He played the part of Constable ('Corky') Turnbull in Sykes and a... (1960–65) which was later revived as Sykes (1972–79). In 1975, he appeared in the ITV children's show The Laughing Policeman, based on the Charles Penrose song and his character from the series.

In between the two series with Eric Sykes, Guyler was also a regular in the sitcom Please Sir! (1968–72), playing the cantankerous school caretaker Norman Potter. Claiming to be an ex-Desert Rat, Potter would often complain to John Alderton, who played the part of schoolteacher Mr Hedges, about class '5C' and their "dreadful behaviour".

Other television appearances include those in That's My Boy (1963), a comedy series starring Jimmy Clitheroe, and the short-lived political comedy Best of Enemies. He also played a tremorous surgeon in the film Carry On Doctor. During the 1980s, he contributed the voice-over to an animated skeleton in UK adverts for Scotch Video Tapes. He was the narrator of the 1979 BBC documentary about Fred Dibnah – Fred Dibnah, Steeplejack.

Guyler had been a devotee of washboard playing since his school days and appeared in many television light entertainment shows performing his washboard novelty act. On the BBC 'Children in Need' show on 26 November 1982, Guyler on washboard accompanied astronomer Patrick Moore on xylophone. He also played washboard on an episode of The Morecambe and Wise Show. In 1990, he played the washboard on three tracks of an album by long-time fan Shakin' Stevens.

== Personal life ==
In 1941, Guyler married Margaret Mary McConnell (a.k.a. "Paddy Lennox"), from the three-sister variety harmony act the Lennox Sisters, and they had two sons. He converted to Roman Catholicism in 1945.

Guyler's passion was collecting jazz records, and as of 1986, he had about 1,600 78 rpm records, collecting records up to about the year 1947. In addition, he was a well known wargamer, and a founding member of the Society of Ancients, a group of wargamers specialising in the classical era. Very active in the society in its early years, being elected its first president in 1966, Guyler was later made an honorary life president of the society.

He died on 7 October 1999 and his funeral service was held at St Mark's Catholic Church, Inala, Queensland, on 13 October.

== Filmography ==
Year	Title	Role	Notes
1945	I'll Be Your Sweetheart	Politician	Uncredited
1952	Winnie-the-Pooh	Eeyore/Narrator (voice)	
1953	A Day to Remember	Angry Man in Ferry Queue	Uncredited
1954	Mad About Men	Editor	
1955	The Flaw	Theatre Manager	Uncredited
1956	Ramsbottom Rides Again	Postman	
1962	It's Trad, Dad!	Narrator	
1962	The Fast Lady	Dr Blake	
1963	Nurse on Wheels	Driving Examiner	
1964	Smokescreen	Station Master	
1964	A Hard Day's Night	Police Inspector	
1964	Ferry Cross the Mersey	Trasler	
1965	The Big Job	Police Sergeant	
1967	Carry On Doctor	Mr. Hardcastle	
1968	Two Off the Cuff	Voice	animation
1971	Please Sir!	Norman Potter	
1973	No Sex Please, We're British	Park Keeper	
1974	Barry McKenzie Holds His Own	Police Constable	
1975	One of Our Dinosaurs Is Missing	Harris	
