= Jon Penington =

British screenwriter and producer (1922–1997)

Jon Penington (1922–1997) was a British screenwriter and film producer.

== Selected filmography ==
- At the Stroke of Nine (1957)
- The Man Who Liked Funerals (1959)
- The Crowning Touch (1959)
- In the Wake of a Stranger (1959)
- Expresso Bongo (1959)
- Zoo Baby (1960)
- The Mouse that Roared (1959)
- Faces in the Dark (1960)
- The Shadow of the Cat (1961)
- The Valiant (1962)
- The Comedy Man (1964)
- The Liquidator (1965)
- Till Death Us Do Part (1969)
