= Walla =

Sound effect imitating the murmur of a crowd in the background

In American radio, film, television, and video games, walla is a sound effect imitating the murmur of a crowd in the background. A group of actors brought together in the post-production stage of film production to create this murmur is known as a walla group or a loop group. According to one story, walla received its name during the early days of radio, when it was discovered that having several people repeat the sound walla in the background was sufficient to mimic the indistinct chatter of a crowd. Nowadays, walla actors make use of real words and conversations, often improvised, tailored to the languages, speech patterns, and accents that might be expected of the crowd to be mimicked.

Rhubarb is used instead in the UK where actors say "rhubarb, rhubarb", gur-gur ("гур-гур") in Russia, and gaya (がや) in Japan, perhaps in part reflecting the varying textures of crowd noise in the different countries. Other phrases are "peas and carrots", "watermelon cantaloupe", "wheelbarrow" and "natter natter" (to which the response is "grommish grommish").
