= Carry On series on screen and stage =

The 2003 DVD logo depicting some of the actors from the series: from left to right; Bernard Bresslaw, Kenneth Williams, Joan Sims, Sid James, Hattie Jacques, Jim Dale, Barbara Windsor and Charles Hawtrey

The Carry On series is a long-running British sequence of comedy films, stage shows and television programmes produced between 1958 and 1992. Distributed by Anglo-Amalgamated from 1958 to 1966, and the Rank Organisation from 1967 to 1978, the films were all made at Pinewood Studios. The series' humour relied largely on innuendo and double entendre. There were thirty-one films, four TV Christmas specials, one television series of thirteen episodes, and three West End and provincial stage plays, all made on time and to a strict budget.

Peter Rogers and Gerald Thomas were the series' sole producer and director respectively. They mostly employed the same crew and a regular group of actors. The main cast predominantly featured Sid James, Kenneth Williams, Charles Hawtrey, Joan Sims, Kenneth Connor, Peter Butterworth, Hattie Jacques, Terry Scott, Bernard Bresslaw, Barbara Windsor, Jack Douglas and Jim Dale. The Carry Ons comprise the largest number of films of any British series and, next to the James Bond films, are the second-longest continually-running UK film series (with a fourteen-year hiatus between 1978 and 1992). Between 1958 and 1992, there were seven writers, principally Norman Hudis (1958–62) and Talbot Rothwell (1963–74). The films were scored by three different composers: Bruce Montgomery from 1958 to 1962; Eric Rogers (1963–75, 1977–78) and Max Harris who scored the 1976 film Carry On England.

In 1969, the UK television channel ITV televised a Christmas special recorded by Thames Television; entitled Carry On Christmas, it was watched by over eight million viewers. Subsequent Christmas specials were recorded in 1970, 1972 and 1973. In 1975, a 13-episode television series was commissioned by ATV for ITV. Carry On Laughing ran for two seasons, with six half-hour episodes in season one and seven in season two. The writer Penelope Gilliatt wrote: "The usual charge to make against the Carry On films is to say that they could be so much better done. This is true enough. They look dreadful, they seem to be edited with a bacon slicer, the effects are perfunctory, and the comic rhythm jerks along like a cat on a cold morning. But if all these things were more elegant, I do not really think the films would be more enjoyable: the badness is part of the funniness."

== Filmography ==
Title	Year	Screenplay	Music	Distributor	Production costs	Notes
Carry On Sergeant	1958	Norman Hudis	Bruce Montgomery	Anglo Amalgamated Film Distributors	£74,000	Carry On Sergeant was based on the novel The Bull Boys by R. F. Delderfield, with additional material by John Antrobus. It was the only film of the series to feature Bob Monkhouse, who played the lead role, with William Hartnell as the titular sergeant. The film introduced Kenneth Williams, Kenneth Connor, Charles Hawtrey, Hattie Jacques and Terry Scott to the series. Production lasted from March to May 1958 and the film was released in August of that year. Sergeant was the third-highest-grossing film in the box office ratings for that month.
Carry On Nurse	1959	Norman Hudis	Bruce Montgomery	Anglo Amalgamated Film Distributors	£71,000	Carry On Nurse was based on the play Ring For Catty by Patrick Cargill and Jack Beal, and was the first film of the series to star Joan Sims. It went on to become the most commercially successful film in the series. The film critic Dilys Powell thought that Nurse was "a welcome breath of good, vulgar, music hall fun, no connected plot to speak of and, in its series of comic or farcical incidents, some excellent playing". Production began in November 1958 and finished the following month. The film was released in March 1959.
Carry On Teacher	1959	Norman Hudis	Bruce Montgomery	Anglo Amalgamated Film Distributors	£78,000	Carry On Teacher starred the popular radio comedian Ted Ray, who was cast because of his success on radio during World War II and later. Ray, who at that time was under contract to ABC Films, proved to be popular with audiences of the film on its general release and, as a result, Peter Rogers planned to cast him in future films. However, ABC producers were enraged at Ray's success for a rival producer and demanded he stop appearing in the Carry On films. Rogers was threatened with legal action and was forced to find another lead actor.
Carry On Constable	1960	Norman Hudis	Bruce Montgomery	Anglo Amalgamated Film Distributors	£82,000	The first of the series to star Sid James, who appeared in a part originally written for Ted Ray, Carry On Constable initially had additional writing material supplied by John Antrobus and Brock Williams, but both efforts were omitted from the final script. As inspiration, Norman Hudis worked closely with officers from Slough police station, where at the time there was an influenza outbreak. Hudis used the pandemic as a basis for the film's screenplay. Production commenced in November 1959 and finished the following month. The film was released in February 1960. Reviews were mixed. A film critic for the Kinematograph Weekly commented "Make no mistake, Carry On Constable will give exhibitors big houses", while a correspondent at The Times thought that the film had "little to recommend it ... good ideas are few, and there is material here for little more than a modest series of television sketches farcically involving the police".
Carry On Regardless	1961	Norman Hudis	Bruce Montgomery	Anglo Amalgamated Film Distributors	£100,000	Carry On Regardless was the first film of the series not to follow a plot; it consisted instead of a series of situational sketches. Out of the series, Regardless had the highest amount of material cut out during the editing process. Hattie Jacques was initially asked to play a leading role in the film, but illness prevented her from doing so and she was given a smaller role as the hospital matron in exchange for a £100 fee. Regardless took seven weeks to make and was released in March 1961.
Carry On Cruising	1962	Norman Hudis	Bruce Montgomery	Anglo Amalgamated Film Distributors	£140,000	Screenwriter Michael Pertwee completed two scripts entitled Carry On Flying and Carry On Smoking – with the latter being based on life within a fire station. Peter Rogers was not keen on either film idea as he was worried that a potential disaster involving either an aeroplane or a fire could happen while the film was on general release. Rogers commissioned a new script from Talbot Rothwell who initially completed a draft for a camping-themed film. Again, Rogers was not keen and asked Norman Hudis to adapt a film script from a short story written by Eric Barker based on a group of holiday makers on a cruise in the Mediterranean. Rothwell's camping script was filed away and used five years later for Carry On Camping. Filming on Cruising began on 8 January 1962 and lasted two months. It was the first film of the series to be shot in colour and was released in April 1962.
Carry On Cabby	1963	Talbot Rothwell	Eric Rogers	Anglo Amalgamated Film Distributors	£149,986	Carry On Cabby marked a return to the black and white format and was the first film in the series to star Jim Dale. The film was based on a stage play by Dick Hills and Sid Green called Call Me a Cab and was intended to be titled as such until midway through production when it became part of the series. The title Call Me a Cab was retained as an alternative name for the film. Cabby is the first film of the series to be written by Talbot Rothwell who took two weeks to complete the script. Charles Hawtrey had to be taught how to drive within one week and passed his driving test the day before shooting commenced in March 1963. Filming lasted just over two months, and the film was released six months later.
Carry On Jack	1964	Talbot Rothwell	Eric Rogers	Anglo Amalgamated Film Distributors	£152,000	The second Carry On film to be shot in colour, Carry On Jack was originally intended to be a separate film from the series, and had the pre-production title of "Up the Armada". However, the title was rejected by the British Board of Film Censors for being too rude, and Peter Rogers named it as part of the series. Jack was the first film of the series to be period based and had the working title of "Carry On Mate". Juliet Mills was cast, having previously appeared in two of Rogers and Thomas' earlier films: Twice Round the Daffodils (1962) and Nurse on Wheels (1963). Production started in September 1963 and finished the following month. Jack was released in February 1964.
Carry On Spying	1964	Talbot Rothwell; Sid Colin	Eric Rogers	Anglo Amalgamated Film Distributors	£148,000	Carry On Spying was the last film of the series to be made in black-and-white, and the first to star Barbara Windsor. Spying was an intended parody of the highly successful James Bond series of films. Peter Rogers registered the title "Carry On Spying" in 1962 on the back of the success that the first James Bond film Dr. No had achieved the same year. Dissatisfied with an initial script by Norman Hudis, Rogers commissioned Rothwell and Sid Colin to write the screenplay instead. Rogers was threatened with legal action by the Bond producers Albert R. Broccoli and Harry Saltzman during Spying's production as the character played by Charles Hawtrey was named James Bind; the character's name was changed to Charlie Bind as a result. Production on Spying started in February 1964 and finished the following month. It was released that June.
Carry On Cleo	1964	Talbot Rothwell	Eric Rogers	Anglo Amalgamated Film Distributors	£194,323	"It is the most sumptuous of all the ten Carry On comedies. Not the funniest but still very funny in parts and a far bigger laugh than the more ambitious efforts of the Taylor-Burton-Harrison team" was the Daily Mail's response to Carry On Cleo on its general release in November 1964. Cleo was made soon after the Hollywood feature Cleopatra (1963) and used many of the latter's abandoned sets and costumes. Filming began in July and finished in August 1964. It was released in October the same year.
Carry On Cowboy	1965	Talbot Rothwell	Eric Rogers	Anglo Amalgamated Film Distributors	£195,000	Carry On Cowboy was the first film of the series to star Peter Butterworth and Bernard Bresslaw. The film also featured a cameo by the series's composer Eric Rogers as the band leader in the saloon bar. Production started in July and finished in September 1965. Cowboy was released in November that year.
Carry On Screaming!	1966	Talbot Rothwell	Eric Rogers	Anglo Amalgamated Film Distributors	£197,500	Sid James, who was recovering from a heart attack, was replaced by Harry H. Corbett in the lead role. At 98 minutes, Carry On Screaming!'s duration was the longest of the series. The distinctive opening music was released on vinyl on a 45 rpm in 1966. It was sung by the vocalist Boz Burrell, though the version used in the film (and credited to 'Anon') was actually sung by the Embassy Records session singer Ray Pilgrim.
Don't Lose Your Head	1967	Talbot Rothwell	Eric Rogers	Rank Organisation	£200,000	In 1966, Anglo Amalgamated Film Distributors Ltd appointed Nat Cohen as its new managing director. Cohen disliked the Carry On series intensely, forcing Peter Rogers to strike a deal with Rank Organisation instead. The deal was confirmed within days on the condition that the Carry On prefix be omitted due to its close association to Anglo Amalgamated. Rogers blamed the low box-office takings for both Don't Lose Your Head and the following film Follow That Camel on the change in title. During general release, the "Carry On" prefix was added back and the films received an extended release. The reinstatement resulted in a surge in takings, causing the Rank Organisation to relent and allow the Carry On title to be reinstated officially for the 1967 film Carry On Doctor.
Follow That Camel	1967	Talbot Rothwell	Eric Rogers	Rank Organisation	£288,366	Based loosely on the P.C. Wren adventure novel Beau Geste, Peter Rogers decided to cast Phil Silvers in place of Sid James who had suffered another minor heart attack a few months before production began. Silvers was paid a fee of £40,000 in total, the highest of any actor in the history of the series.
Carry On Doctor	1967	Talbot Rothwell	Eric Rogers	Rank Organisation	£214,000	Carry On Doctor was the first medical theme–based Carry On film for eight years, and was the first of two Carry On films to star the comedian Frankie Howerd. It was also to be the last film of the series according to Peter Rogers. Joan Sims was originally asked to play the part of "Matron" after her earlier success playing a similar part in Doctor in Clover, but the part eventually went to Hattie Jacques. With the Carry On prefix still an unfavourable title among Rank producers, Rothwell initially entitled the script "Nurse Carries on Again". Doctor was also the first of four Carry On films to have illustrations on the opening credits. They were drawn by Larry, an illustrator for Punch. Production started in September 1967 and finished the following month. Doctor was released in December that year.
Carry On Up the Khyber	1968	Talbot Rothwell	Eric Rogers	Rank Organisation	£260,000	Filmed on location in Snowdonia, North Wales, Carry On...Up the Khyber was the only film of the series to venture out of England for filming. Up the Khyber was voted 99th in the British Film Institute's poll of the finest 100 films ever made. Despite the tight, two-month filming schedule, it took three days to complete the final dinner scene. Filming began in March and finished in May 1968 and the film was released in August 1968.
Carry On Camping	1969	Talbot Rothwell	Eric Rogers	Rank Organisation	£208,354	Carry On Camping scored a number one at the box office for 1969 and became infamous for the sequence in which Barbara Windsor's bra flew off during early morning exercises. So risqué was this scene, that Ireland banned the film on its domestic release. Camping was filmed between October and November 1968 and held its premiere on 3 July 1969.
Carry On Again Doctor	1969	Talbot Rothwell	Eric Rogers	Rank Organisation	£219,000	Carry On Again Doctor was the last film to star Jim Dale. Dale insisted on performing all his own stunts for the film and broke his arm as a result. The film's composer Eric Rogers makes his second on-screen appearance as the trumpet player during the hospital dance sequence. Again Doctor began filming on 17 March 1969 and finished three weeks later at the beginning of May. Again Doctor went on general release in August 1969.
Carry On Up the Jungle	1970	Talbot Rothwell	Eric Rogers	Rank Organisation	£210,000	Carry On Up the Jungle had the pre-production title of "Carry On Tarzan" but was changed as the name "Tarzan" was owned by the estate of Edgar Rice Burroughs. It was the second and final film of the series to star Frankie Howerd, whose part was originally written for Kenneth Williams. Up the Jungle went into production in October 1969 and took three weeks to make. It was released in March 1970.
Carry On Loving	1970	Talbot Rothwell	Eric Rogers	Rank Organisation	£215,000	Talbot Rothwell wrote a script called "Carry On Courting" but it was re-titled by Rogers to Carry On Loving. Loving was one of the cheapest films of the series to make but grossed one of the biggest profits at the box-office. Dick Richards from the Daily Mirror thought that Rothwell "whipped up some funny situations" while the Daily Express predicted that "The fun lovers who have flocked to the cinema and made the other films so successful will no doubt flock to this." Filming started in May 1970, finished in June and was released in September the same year.
Carry On Henry	1971	Talbot Rothwell	Eric Rogers	Rank Organisation	£223,000	Carry On Henry's pre-production title was "Anne of a Thousand Lays" – and was as the title suggested; a parody of the Richard Burton film Anne of the Thousand Days (1969). Sid James wore the same costume used by Burton in the earlier film. Gerald Thomas managed to secure royal permission to film in the grounds of Windsor Castle – a first for any British film. Filming started in October 1970 and finished the following month. Henry was released in February 1971.
Carry On at Your Convenience	1971	Talbot Rothwell	Eric Rogers	Rank Organisation	£220,000	Carry On at Your Convenience was known as Carry On Round the Bend outside the United Kingdom and was the first box-office loss of the series. The failure was attributed to the film's political theme about the trade union movement as it portrayed the union activists as incompetent troublemakers. A profit on the film was not made until 1976 after several international and television sales. The film was the first of two Carry On's to star Kenneth Cope.
Carry On Matron	1972	Talbot Rothwell	Eric Rogers	Rank Organisation	£224,995	Carry On Matron was the last medical-based film of the series. Norman Hudis was initially asked back to produce a script for what would be the 23rd Carry On film of the series. However, as a result of his membership in the Writers Guild of America, difficulties arose and the contract was never signed. Matron went into production in October 1971 and was the first film of the series to feature Jack Douglas, who was paid £25 for his role which took him a day to film. Filming finished in November 1971 and Matron was released in May 1972.
Carry On Abroad	1972	Talbot Rothwell	Eric Rogers	Rank Organisation	£225,000	Filming for Carry On Abroad began on 17 April 1972 and was the last Carry On to star Charles Hawtrey. Filmed entirely in England, Abroad was completed within a month and was released in December 1972. It featured the highest number of Carry On regulars, with only Jim Dale and Terry Scott missing from the core cast.
Carry On Girls	1973	Talbot Rothwell	Eric Rogers	Rank Organisation	£205,962	Carry On Girls had a six-week shooting schedule which started on 16 April 1973 on location in Brighton. Gerald Thomas was eager to cast Kenneth Williams, but Williams turned the role down owing to theatre commitments. To accommodate him, Thomas trimmed the role down to entice Williams to join the cast, but he again refused. The part then went to the Scottish comedian Jimmy Logan in what was to become his second Carry On engagement. Girls was released in November 1973.
Carry On Dick	1974	Talbot Rothwell	Eric Rogers	Rank Organisation	£245,000	In 1974 Talbot Rothwell was unsure about renewing his contract with Peter Rogers forcing Rogers to enlist the writers Lawrie Wyman and George Evans to produce a script instead. However, Rothwell decided to accept the contract at the last minute and Wyman and Evans were dropped. Wyman and Evans's plot was acknowledged within the credits as "Based on a treatment by Lawrie Wyman and George Evans". Owing to the pressure of producing a quality script in a limited amount of time, Rothwell was forced to retire halfway through the script's draft after suffering an attack of nervous exhaustion. Carry On Dick was to be his last film for the series, and was also the last for both Sid James and Hattie Jacques. Dick started filming in March 1974, finished a month later and was released in July the same year.
Carry On Behind	1975	Dave Freeman	Eric Rogers	Rank Organisation	£217,000	Talbot Rothwell was busy with other writing commitments when approached by Rogers for another holiday-based Carry On, so Dave Freeman was enlisted to complete the screenplay for what would become the 27th film in the series. The German model Elke Sommer was cast for a fee of £30,000 to play the Roman expert Anna Vooshka. Carry On Behind was the last film of the series to star Bernard Bresslaw and Patsy Rowlands. Filming began in March 1975 and lasted a month. Behind went on general release in December 1975.
Carry On England	1976	David Pursall; Jack Seddon	Max Harris	Rank Organisation	£250,000	Carry On England was originally intended as a television episode for the 1975 Carry On Laughing series the previous year, but the writers David Pursell and Jack Seddon, were asked to adapt their script – "The Busting of Balsy" – into a film instead. England was the only film of the series to be partially funded by both Peter Rogers and Gerald Thomas: Rank refused to pay the full amount. England featured Patrick Mower in place of Sid James, who had died a month before filming began in May 1976. The film took a month to make and was released in October 1976. Due to the topless nudity and one use of the word "Fokker" it was released with a 'AA' certificate which excluded anyone under the age of 14, before the scenes were cut and the film passed with an 'A' certificate, which had been common throughout the series.
That's Carry On!	1977	Tony Church	Eric Rogers	Rank Organisation	£30,000	Compilation film presented by Kenneth Williams and Barbara Windsor. That's Carry On! was to be Windsor's 10th and last appearance in the series. The idea for the film was inspired by Metro-Goldwyn-Mayer's popular compilation film That's Entertainment! (1974). That's Carry On! was co-produced by EMI, and was a box-office flop.
Carry On Emmannuelle	1978	Lance Peters	Eric Rogers	Rank Organisation and Hemdale Film Corporation	£320,000	With Rank having pulled out of the series altogether the previous year, Peter Rogers was approached by the private investment company Cleves Investments, which invested £349,000 on the new production. Rogers was keen to capitalise on the popularity of the Confessions of... series which had proved popular with British cinema audiences and so hired the Australian author Lance Peters, a prominent writer of Australian sex comedies, to produce a script. Emmannuelle marked the end of an era; not only was it the last film for fourteen years, but it was also the last film of the series to star Peter Butterworth, Kenneth Williams, Kenneth Connor and Joan Sims. Carry On Emmannuelle began filming in April 1978, finished the following month and was released in November the same year. Owing to the increased sexual nature of the film it was given a 'AA' certificate in the UK, which excluded anyone under the age of 14.
Carry On Columbus	1992	Dave Freeman; John Antrobus	John Du Prez	Island World	£2,500,000	Devised and produced by John Goldstone, Columbus was the most expensive Carry On of the series. It had financial backing from Twentieth Century Fox Film Corporation and began filming in April 1992. To enable the release to coincide with the 500th anniversary of the Christopher Columbus voyage to America, Rogers commissioned Dave Freeman to produce a script in record time. A new generation of comedy actors were cast, including Rik Mayall, Keith Allen, Alexei Sayle and Julian Clary. Jim Dale returned to lead the cast and Jack Douglas featured in a small role. Frankie Howerd was asked to star but died two days before the start of filming.

== Television ==
Title	Date	Length	Screenplay	Cast
"Carry On Christmas"	24 December 1969	50 minutes	Talbot Rothwell	Sid James, Terry Scott, Charles Hawtrey, Hattie Jacques, Barbara Windsor, Bernard Bresslaw, Peter Butterworth and Frankie Howerd
"Carry On Again Christmas"	24 December 1970	50 minutes	Dave Freeman; Sid Colin	Sid James, Terry Scott, Charles Hawtrey, Kenneth Connor, Bernard Bresslaw, Bob Todd, Wendy Richard and Barbara Windsor
"Carry On Christmas" (Or Carry On Stuffing)	20 December 1972	50 minutes	Talbot Rothwell; Dave Freeman	Hattie Jacques, Joan Sims, Barbara Windsor, Kenneth Connor, Peter Butterworth, Norman Rossington, Jack Douglas, Brian Oulton and Valerie Leon
"What a Carry On!"	4 October 1973	50 minutes	Archive footage only	Sid James, Barbara Windsor, Kenneth Connor, Peter Butterworth, Bernard Bresslaw and Jack Douglas
"Carry On Christmas"	24 December 1973	50 minutes	Talbot Rothwell	Sid James, Joan Sims, Barbara Windsor, Kenneth Connor, Peter Butterworth, Bernard Bresslaw and Julian Holloway
Carry On Laughing: "The Prisoner of Spenda"	4 January 1975	21 minutes	Dave Freeman	Sid James, Barbara Windsor, Peter Butterworth, Joan Sims, Kenneth Connor, Jack Douglas, David Lodge and Ronnie Brody
Carry On Laughing: "The Baron Outlook"	11 January 1975	24 minutes	Dave Freeman	Sid James, Joan Sims, Barbara Windsor, Kenneth Connor, Peter Butterworth, Diane Langton and David Lodge
Carry On Laughing: "The Sobbing Cavalier"	18 January 1975	23 minutes	Dave Freeman	Sid James, Jack Douglas, Barbara Windsor, Joan Sims, Peter Butterworth and David Lodge
Carry On Laughing: "Orgy and Bess"	25 January 1975	23 minutes	Barry Cryer; Dick Vosburgh	Sid James, Kenneth Connor, Barbara Windsor, Hattie Jacques and Jack Douglas
Carry On Laughing: "One in the Eye for Harold"	1 February 1975	24 minutes	Lew Schwarz	Jack Douglas, Kenneth Connor, Joan Sims, Diane Langton, David Lodge and Norman Chappell
Carry On Laughing: "The Nine Old Cobblers"	8 February 1975	24 minutes	Dave Freeman	Jack Douglas, Kenneth Connor, Joan Sims, Barbara Windsor and David Lodge
Carry On Laughing: "Under the Round Table"	26 October 1975	25 minutes	Lew Schwarz	Kenneth Connor, Joan Sims, Peter Butterworth, Bernard Bresslaw, Jack Douglas, Oscar James, Victor Maddern, Norman Chappell, Ronnie Brody and Brian Capron
Carry On Laughing: "The Case of the Screaming Winkles"	2 November 1975	24 minutes	Dave Freeman	Jack Douglas, Kenneth Connor, Joan Sims, Peter Butterworth and David Lodge
Carry On Laughing: "And in My Lady's Chamber"	9 November 1975	25 minutes	Lew Schwarz	Kenneth Connor, Joan Sims, Peter Butterworth, Bernard Bresslaw, Jack Douglas, Sherrie Hewson, Andrew Ray and Carol Hawkins
Carry On Laughing: "Short Knight, Long Daze"	16 November 1975	24 minutes	Lew Schwarz	Kenneth Connor, Barbara Windsor, Joan Sims, Peter Butterworth, Bernard Bresslaw, Jack Douglas, Norman Chappell and Brian Capron
Carry On Laughing: "The Case of the Coughing Parrot"	23 November 1975	24 minutes	Dave Freeman	Jack Douglas, Kenneth Connor, Joan Sims, David Lodge, Sherrie Hewson, Peter Butterworth, Norman Chappell and Johnny Briggs
Carry On Laughing: "Who Needs Kitchener?"	30 November 1975	25 minutes	Lew Schwarz	Kenneth Connor, Barbara Windsor, Jack Douglas, Joan Sims, Bernard Bresslaw, Andrew Ray, Sherrie Hewson and Carol Hawkins
Carry On Laughing: "Lamp Posts of the Empire"	7 December 1975	24 minutes	Lew Schwarz	Barbara Windsor, Kenneth Connor, Jack Douglas, Bernard Bresslaw, Peter Butterworth, Oscar James, Norman Chappell and Michael Nightingale
"Christmas Classics"	22 December 1983	24 minutes	Talbot Rothwell; Dave Freeman	Kenneth Williams and Barbara Windsor

== Stage shows ==
Title	Date	Theatre	Written by	Cast	Ref.
Carry On London!	4 October 1973 – March 1975	Victoria Palace Theatre, London	Talbot Rothwell; Dave Freeman; Eric Merriman	Sid James, Barbara Windsor, Kenneth Connor, Peter Butterworth, Bernard Bresslaw and Jack Douglas	
Carry On Laughing: The Slimming Factory	16 June – September 1976	Royal Opera House, Scarborough	Sam Cree	Liz Fraser, Kenneth Connor, Peter Butterworth, Jack Douglas and Anne Aston	
Wot a Carry On in Blackpool	22 May – 25 October 1992	North Pier, Blackpool	Barry Cryer; Dick Vosburgh	Bernard Bresslaw and Barbara Windsor	

== Sources ==
- Ross, Robert (1996). The Carry On Companion. London: Batsford. ISBN 978-0-7134-8771-8.
- Ross, Robert (2005). The Carry On Story. London: Reynolds and Hearn Ltd. ISBN 978-1-903111-96-3.
- Goodwin, Cliff (2011). Sid James: A Biography. London: Random House. ISBN 978-0-7535-4682-6.
- Hunter, I. Q.; Porter, Laraine (2012). British Comedy Cinema. London: Routledge. ISBN 978-0-415-66667-1.
- Snelgrove, Kevin (2003). The Carry On Book of Statistics. Somerset: KAS Publications. ISBN 978-0-9544200-0-0.
- Snelgrove, Kevin (2008). The Official Carry On Facts, Figures and Statistics. Norfolk: Apex Publishing Ltd. ISBN 978-1-906358-09-9.
- Webber, Richard (2008). 50 Years of Carry On. London: Arrow. ISBN 978-0-09-949007-4.
