= Carry On Up the Jungle =

1970 British comedy film by Gerald Thomas

- Original UK quad poster by Renato Fratini
- Directed by: Gerald Thomas
- Written by: Talbot Rothwell
- Produced by: Peter Rogers
- Starring: Frankie Howerd; Sid James; Charles Hawtrey; Joan Sims; Terry Scott; Kenneth Connor; Bernard Bresslaw; Jacki Piper
- Cinematography: Ernest Steward
- Edited by: Alfred Roome
- Music by: Eric Rogers
- Distributed by: Rank Organisation
- Release date: 20 March 1970
- Running time: 89 minutes
- Country: United Kingdom
- Language: English
- Budget: £210,000

Carry On Up the Jungle is a 1970 British adventure comedy film, the 19th release in the series of 31 Carry On films (1958–1992). The film marked Frankie Howerd's second and final appearance in the series. He stars alongside regular players Sid James, Charles Hawtrey, Joan Sims, Terry Scott and Bernard Bresslaw. Kenneth Connor returns to the series for the first time since Carry On Cleo six years earlier and would now feature in almost every entry up to Carry On Emmannuelle in 1978. Jacki Piper makes the first of her four appearances in the series. This movie is a send-up of the classic Tarzan films. It features an unusually dark tone for the series, as the protagonists are faced with certain death after they are apprehended by a cannibalistic tribe in the jungle. The film was followed by Carry On Loving (1970).

== Plot ==
Ornithologist Professor Inigo Tinkle tells a less-than-enraptured audience about his most recent expedition to Africa in search of the Oozlum bird, which is said to fly in ever decreasing circles until it disappears up its own rear end. Financing the expedition is Lady Evelyn Bagley and the team is led by the lecherous Bill Boosey and his African guide Upsidasi. Also on the expedition is Tinkle's assistant, Claude Chumley and June, Lady Bagley's maidservant. Soon after the journey starts, a gorilla terrorises the campsite, and the travellers realise they have ventured into the territory of the "Noshas", a tribe of cannibals.

On the first night of the expedition, Lady Bagley reveals that she is there to find her long-lost husband Walter and baby son Cecil, who vanished twenty years before on their honeymoon, whilst out on a walk, in the very vicinity the group is exploring. Her husband is believed to be dead, but she hopes to find Cecil's nappy pin as something to remember him by. Watching them from the bushes is Ug, a white jungle dweller. The next day, June stumbles across an oasis where she saves Ug from drowning and the two fall in love.

That night, Ug wanders into Lady Bagley's tent (mistaking it for June's), and she is astonished to see that Ug wears Cecil's nappy pin. Ug, who turns out to be Cecil, flees in fear while Lady Bagley faints with shock. The next day, the travellers are kidnapped by the Noshas. Intending rescue, Ug accidentally catapults himself into the Nosha camp and starts a fire. In the chaos, Ug, June and Upsidasi escape. However, the enraged Noshas apprehend the other travellers and prepare to kill them.

As they wait to be put to death, they are rescued by the all-female Lubby-Dubby tribe led by Leda from the Lost World of Aphrodisia. They are taken to Aphrodisia to meet the king of the tribe, Tonka, who turns out to be Walter Bagley, who was taken by the Noshas years ago, but saved and brought to Aphrodisia by the tribal women. Evelyn Bagley is infuriated that he never bothered to search for Cecil and laments she has seen him but has once again lost him. June and Ug are actually living happily together and June is teaching Ug to speak English.

Bill Boosey, Tinkle and Chumley enjoy the attention given to them by the tribal women, and Tinkle and Chumley are stunned to find that the Oozlum bird is in fact a sacred animal to the Lubby-Dubbies. Meanwhile, the Lubby-Dubbies need the menfolk to save themselves from extinction, as no males have been born in Aphrodisia for over a century. The men think their dreams have come true, until Leda makes it clear that the Lubby-Dubbies have no intention of letting them go. Tonka implies that the last man who tried to escape Aphrodisia was murdered by the tribe.

Lady Bagley is resentful of this work the men have been given and taking over control from her husband, ensures the mates assigned to them are the tribe's least attractive women. Three months later, the men are fed up, while Leda is outraged that nobody has got pregnant. She eventually overthrows Tonka, threatening harm to the men. Upsidasi arrives disguised as a woman, saying he has brought soldiers to save them. Ug and June also search for their friends and Ug summons a stampede of animals to create chaos and enable the men to get away. During the confusion, Tinkle snatches the Oozlum bird, and the team escape along with Tonka. After the chaos, Leda and her army chase after the men, but are more interested in the trampled soldiers. She says to let the others go; they no longer need them now that they have "some real men". Lady Bagley is reunited with Ug, and the group return to England. Tinkle unveils his Oozlum bird to his audience, only to find it has apparently vanished up inside itself. June and Ug are happily married with a baby and live in a treehouse in the suburbs whilst Ug goes to work in a bowler hat, suit, and no shoes.

== Cast ==
- Frankie Howerd as Professor Inigo Tinkle
- Sid James as Bill Boosey
- Charles Hawtrey as Walter Bagley/King Tonka
- Joan Sims as Lady Evelyn Bagley
- Kenneth Connor as Claude Chumley
- Bernard Bresslaw as Upsidasi
- Terry Scott as Ug the Jungle Boy/Cecil Bagley
- Jacki Piper as June
- Valerie Leon as Leda
- Reuben Martin as Gorilla
- Edwina Carroll as Nerda
- Danny Daniels as Nosha Chief
- Yemi Ajibadi as Witch Doctor
- Lincoln Webb as Nosha with girl
- Heather Emmanuel as Pregnant Lubi
- Verna Lucille MacKenzie as Gong Lubi
- Valerie Moore as Lubi Lieutenant
- Cathi March as Lubi Lieutenant
- Nina Baden-Semper as girl Nosha (uncredited)
- Roy Stewart as Nosha (uncredited)
- John Hamilton as Nosha (uncredited)
- Willie Jonah as Nosha (uncredited)
- Chris Konyils as Nosha (uncredited)

== Crew ==
- Screenplay – Talbot Rothwell
- Music – Eric Rogers
- Production Manager – Jack Swinburne
- Director of Photography – Ernest Steward
- Editor – Alfred Roome
- Art Director – Alex Vetchinsky
- Assistant Editor – Jack Gardner
- Camera Operator – James Bawden
- Assistant Director – Jack Causey
- Continuity – Josephine Knowles
- Make-up – Geoffrey Rodway
- Sound Recordists – RT MacPhee & Ken Barker
- Hairdresser – Stella Rivers
- Costume Designer – Courtenay Elliott
- Dubbing Editor – Colin Miller
- Titles – GSE Ltd
- Producer – Peter Rogers
- Director – Gerald Thomas

== Filming and locations ==
- Filming dates – 13 October to 21 November 1969
- Maidenhead Library – The location for Professor Tinkle's lecture. The building is now demolished but the original site is directly opposite Maidenhead Town Hall, as featured in Carry On Doctor, Carry On Again Doctor and Carry On Behind.
- Clarence Crescent, Windsor - location of the very final scene of the movie

Pinewood Studios was used for both interior and exterior filming.

== Production and casting ==
Carry On Up the Jungle is, in part, a parody of Hammer Film Productions' "Cavegirl" series: One Million Years B.C. (1966) and Slave Girls (1967), and more particularly Edgar Rice Burroughs' Tarzan series of books and films.

Bernard Bresslaw learned all his native orders in Swahili; however, the "African" extras were of Caribbean origin and did not understand. But Sid James, who was born in South Africa, recognised it and congratulated him.

The storyline is partly referenced in the Christmas Special Carry On, when all the characters sit down for Christmas Dinner and eat the Oozlum bird instead of a traditional Turkey.

Charles Hawtrey (born November 1914) as Walter Bagley plays the father of Ugg/Cecil Bagley Terry Scott (born May 1927) despite being merely twelve and a half years his senior. Joan Sims (born May 1930) as Lady Bagley plays his mother though she is three years his junior.

The role of Professor Tinkle was written for Kenneth Williams, and the role of Jungle Boy was written for Jim Dale, but Williams was unavailable as he was preparing to star in his own BBC television series, The Kenneth Williams Show, and Dale turned down his part due to the character having limited dialogue.

== Reception ==
The film was among the eight most popular movies at the UK box office in 1970.

In a diary entry for Saturday 3 April 1976, Kenneth Williams wrote about the film, which he watched on television that evening, in positive terms. "It was quite funny and at one point I was laughing aloud. I was staggered to see what they got away with!" He was particularly complimentary about Kenneth Connor and Terry Scott, less so about Sid James.

== Bibliography ==
- Davidson, Andy (2012). Carry On Confidential. London: Miwk. ISBN 978-1-908630-01-8.
- Sheridan, Simon (2011). Keeping the British End Up – Four Decades of Saucy Cinema. London: Titan Books. ISBN 978-0-85768-279-6.
- Webber, Richard (2009). 50 Years of Carry On. London: Arrow. ISBN 978-0-09-949007-4.
- Hudis, Norman (2008). No Laughing Matter. London: Apex. ISBN 978-1-906358-15-0.
- Keeping the British End Up: Four Decades of Saucy Cinema by Simon Sheridan (third edition) (2007) (Reynolds & Hearn Books)
- Ross, Robert (2002). The Carry On Companion. London: Batsford. ISBN 978-0-7134-8771-8.
- Bright, Morris; Ross, Robert (2000). Mr Carry On – The Life & Work of Peter Rogers. London: BBC Books. ISBN 978-0-563-55183-6.
- Rigelsford, Adrian (1996). Carry On Laughing – a celebration. London: Virgin. ISBN 1-85227-554-5.
- Hibbin, Sally & Nina (1988). What a Carry On. London: Hamlyn. ISBN 978-0-600-55819-4.
- Eastaugh, Kenneth (1978). The Carry On Book. London: David & Charles. ISBN 978-0-7153-7403-0.
