= Alfred Roome =

British film editor and director (1908–1997)

- Born: Alfred Wallace Roome; 22 December 1908; London
- Died: 19 November 1997 (aged 88); Gerrards Cross, Buckinghamshire
- Other names: Alfie Roome; A. W. Room
- Occupations: Film editor Film director
- Years active: 1932–1975
- Spouse: Janice Adair (m. 1929; died 1996)
- Children: 2

Alfred Wallace Roome (22 December 1908 – 19 November 1997) was an English film editor and occasional director.

== Biography ==
Born in London, in 1908, he first worked in the film industry as a film editor on the 1932 British comedy film Thark. He went on to edit mostly comedies over the next forty years including many of the Aldwych Farces films, and Will Hay films such as Boys Will Be Boys.

He directed crime film My Brother's Keeper (1948) and comedy film It's Not Cricket (1949).

In the latter years of his career he edited the Carry On series of films alongside the director, Gerald Thomas. He retired in 1975 after editing Carry On Behind.

== Personal life and death ==
Roome married the actress Janice Adair on 20 February 1936; they remained married until her death in 1996. The couple had two children, a daughter Deirdre, and a son, Christopher Wallace (1937–1987) who was killed in the King's Cross tube station fire of 1987 at age 50. Alfred Roome died on 19 November 1997, in Gerrards Cross, Buckinghamshire at the age of 88.

His granddaughter Olivia works in the film industry.

== Selected filmography ==
=== Editor ===
- Thark (1932)
- Dirty Work (1934)
- Foreign Affaires (1935)
- Stormy Weather (1935)
- Pot Luck (1936)
- The Man Who Changed His Mind (1936)
- All In (1936)
- Oh, Mr Porter! (1937)
- Said O'Reilly to McNab (1937)
- The Lilac Domino (1937)
- Alf's Button Afloat (1938)
- Shipyard Sally (1939)
- Waterloo Road (1945)
- I'll Be Your Sweetheart (1945)
- Highly Dangerous (1950)
- Hotel Sahara (1951)
- The Planter's Wife (1952)
- Always a Bride (1953)
- Top of the Form (1953)
- To Dorothy a Son (1954)
- Up to His Neck (1954)
- The Woman for Joe (1955)
- The Black Tent (1956)
- A Tale of Two Cities (1958)
- The Big Money (1958).
- Nor the Moon by Night (1958)
- Upstairs and Downstairs (1959)
- The 39 Steps (1959)
- Conspiracy of Hearts (1960)
- Doctor in Love (1960)
- No Love for Johnnie (1961)
- A Pair of Briefs (1962)
- Doctor in Distress (1963)
- The Informers (1963)
- Hot Enough for June (1964)
- Doctor in Clover (1966)
- Deadlier Than the Male (1967)
- Follow That Camel (1967)
- Carry On Doctor (1967)
- Carry On... Up the Khyber (1968)
- Carry On Camping (1969)
- Carry On Again Doctor (1969)
- Carry On Up the Jungle (1970)
- Carry On Loving (1970)
- Carry On Henry (1971)
- Carry On at Your Convenience (1971)
- Bless This House (1972)
- Carry On Matron (1972)
- Carry On Abroad (1972)
- Carry On Girls (1973)
- Carry On Dick (1974)
- Carry On Behind (1975)

=== Director ===
- My Brother's Keeper (1948)
- It's Not Cricket (1949)

=== Producer ===
- A Boy, a Girl and a Bike (1949)
