= Carry On at Your Convenience =

1971 British comedy film by Gerald Thomas

Carry on at Your Convenience
- Original UK quad poster by Renato Fratini
- Directed by: Gerald Thomas
- Written by: Talbot Rothwell
- Produced by: Peter Rogers
- Starring: Sid James; Kenneth Williams; Charles Hawtrey; Joan Sims; Hattie Jacques; Bernard Bresslaw; Kenneth Cope
- Cinematography: Ernest Steward
- Edited by: Alfred Roome
- Music by: Eric Rogers
- Distributed by: Rank Organisation
- Release date: 10 December 1971
- Running time: 86 minutes
- Country: United Kingdom
- Language: English
- Budget: £218,805

Carry On at Your Convenience (also known as Carry On Round the Bend outside the UK) is a 1971 British comedy film, directed by Gerald Thomas and starring regulars Sid James, Kenneth Williams, Charles Hawtrey, Joan Sims, Hattie Jacques and Bernard Bresslaw and Kenneth Cope in the first of his two Carry On appearances. It was written by Talbot Rothwell and produced by Peter Rogers.

It was the 22nd release in the series of 31 Carry On films (1958–1992) and the first box office failure. This has been attributed to the film's attempt at exploring the political themes of the trade union movement, portraying union activists as idle, pedantic buffoons, which apparently alienated the traditional working-class audience of the series. The film did not return full production costs until 1976 after several international and television sales. It was followed by Carry On Matron in 1972.

== Plot ==
In bathroom ceramics factory W.C. Boggs & Son, the traditionalist owner W.C. Boggs is having no end of trouble. Bolshy and lazy union representative Vic Spanner continually stirs up trouble in the works, to the irritation of his co-workers and management. He calls a strike for almost any minor incident – or because he wants time off to attend a local football match. Sid Plummer is the site foreman bridging the gap between workers and management, shrewdly keeping the place going amid the unrest.

Prissy floral-shirt-wearing product designer Charles Coote has included a bidet in his latest range of designs, but W.C. objects to the manufacture of such "dubious" items. W.C. will not change his stance even after his son, Lewis Boggs, secures a large overseas order for the bidets. It is a deal that could save the struggling firm, which W.C. has to admit is in debt to the banks.

Vic's dim stooge Bernie Hulke provides bumbling assistance in both his union machinations and his attempts to woo Sid's daughter, factory canteen worker Myrtle. She is torn between Vic and Lewis Boggs, who is something of a playboy but insists he loves her.

Sid's wife is Beattie, a lazy housewife who does little but fuss over her pet budgie, Joey, which refuses to talk despite her intense efforts. Their neighbour is Sid's brassy and lascivious co-worker Chloe Moore. Chloe contends with the endless strikes and with her crude husband, travelling salesman Fred, who neglects her and leaves her dissatisfied. Chloe and Sid enjoy a flirtatious relationship and are sorely tempted to stray.

Sid and Beattie find that Joey can correctly predict winners of horseraces – he tweets when the horse's name is read out. Sid bets on Joey's tips and achieves several large wins – including a vital £1,000 loaned to W.C. when the banks refuse a bridging loan – before Benny, Sid's bookie, fed up with having made these payouts, refuses to accept further bets, larger than £5, from him.

The strikers finally return to work, but it is only to attend the annual works outing, a coach trip to Brighton. A good time is had by all with barriers coming down between workers and management, thanks largely to that great social lubricant, alcohol. W.C. becomes intoxicated and spends the day – and, it appears, the night – with his faithful, adoring secretary, Miss Hortense Withering. Lewis Boggs manages to win Myrtle from Vic Spanner, giving his rival a beating, and the couple elope. After arriving home late after the outing and with Fred away, Chloe invites Sid in for a cup of tea. They fight their desires and ultimately decide not to have the tea, fearing that neighbours might see Sid enter Chloe's home and get the wrong idea.

At the picket lines the next day, Vic gets his comeuppance – partly at the hands of his mother, who spanks him in public – and the workers and management all pull together to produce the big order to save the firm.

== Cast ==
- Sid James as Sid Plummer
- Kenneth Williams as WC Boggs
- Charles Hawtrey as Charles Coote
- Hattie Jacques as Beattie Plummer
- Joan Sims as Chloe Moore
- Bernard Bresslaw as Bernie Hulke
- Kenneth Cope as Vic Spanner
- Jacki Piper as Myrtle Plummer
- Richard O'Callaghan as Lewis Boggs
- Patsy Rowlands as Hortense Withering
- Davy Kaye as Benny
- Bill Maynard as Fred Moore
- Renée Houston as Agatha Spanner
- Marianne Stone as Maud
- Margaret Nolan as Popsy
- Geoffrey Hughes as Willie
- Hugh Futcher as Ernie
- Simon Cain as barman
- Amelia Bayntun as Mrs Spragg
- Leon Greene as chef
- Harry Towb as film doctor
- Shirley Stelfox as bunny waitress
- Larry Martyn as rifle range owner
- Peter Burton as hotel manager
- Julian Holloway as Roger
- Anouska Hempel as new canteen girl

== Crew ==
- Screenplay – Talbot Rothwell
- Music – Eric Rogers
- Production Manager – Jack Swinburne
- Art Director – Lionel Couch
- Editor – Alfred Roome
- Director of Photography – Ernest Steward
- Camera Operator – James Bawden
- Make-up – Geoffrey Rodway
- Continuity – Rita Davidson
- Assistant Director – David Bracknell
- Sound Recordists – Danny Daniel & Ken Barker
- Hairdresser – Stella Rivers
- Costume Designer – Courtenay Elliott
- Set Dresser – Peter Howitt
- Assistant Art Director – William Alexander
- Dubbing Editor – Brian Holland
- Titles – GSE Ltd
- Processor – Rank Film Laboratories
- Toilets – Royal Doulton Sanitary Potteries
- Assistant Editor – Jack Gardner
- Producer – Peter Rogers
- Director – Gerald Thomas

== Filming and locations ==
- Filming dates – 22 March – 7 May 1971

Interiors:

- Pinewood Studios, Buckinghamshire

Exteriors:

- Brighton Palace Pier. The West Pier in Brighton was used two years later for Carry On Girls.
- Brighton – Clarges Hotel. The same location was also used in Carry On Girls.
- Pinewood Studios. The studio's wood storage area was used as the exterior of W.C. Boggs' factory.
- Pinewood Green, Pinewood Estate. The Plummers' house and the Moores' house.
- The Red Lion, Shreding Green, Buckinghamshire
- Kings Head, Albourne, West Sussex
- Cricketers Inn
- Royal Naval Arms
- The Seagull
- The Trout Inn
- The Man In Space
- Odeon Cinema, Uxbridge, Middlesex (demolished in September 1984)
- Heatherden Hall, Pinewood Studios
- Black Park Country Park, Iver Heath, Buckinghamshire

== Production notes ==
After Sid James's character was criticised for leering at some girls in Carry On Henry (1971), here his character was changed to the put-upon family man similar to the character he portrayed in the TV sitcom Bless This House. In the next film Carry On Matron (1972), his character was preoccupied with thieving, but made occasional suggestive comments to nurses (including one played by Jacki Piper, who played his daughter in this film). James's girl-chasing persona was fully reinstated for subsequent films.

== Reception ==
The Monthly Film Bulletin wrote: "Twenty one Carry On... films have understandably exhausted the supply of lavatorial puns, and though the twenty-second does not scruple about re-using several of them, Talbot Rothwell tends generally to neglect his W.C. factory (a thinly disguised Pinewood Studios) for a series of irrelevant sketches ranging from farce (the works outing) to domestic comedy (Sid and the budgie). The result seems even more scrappily assembled than usual and, with the exception of a fairly amusing parody of sex education films, the level of humour, though noticeably cleaner than of late, is still rock bottom."

== See also ==
- Prague Philharmonic, Gavin Sutherland conducting. The carry on album: music from the films. London: ASV, p1999. LCCN 00300982

== Bibliography ==
- Davidson, Andy (2012). Carry On Confidential. London: Miwk. ISBN 978-1-908630-01-8.
- Sheridan, Simon (2011). Keeping the British End Up – Four Decades of Saucy Cinema. London: Titan Books. ISBN 978-0-85768-279-6.
- Webber, Richard (2009). 50 Years of Carry On. London: Arrow. ISBN 978-0-09-949007-4.
- Hudis, Norman (2008). No Laughing Matter. London: Apex. ISBN 978-1-906358-15-0.
- Ross, Robert (2002). The Carry On Companion. London: Batsford. ISBN 978-0-7134-8771-8.
- Bright, Morris; Ross, Robert (2000). Mr Carry On – The Life & Work of Peter Rogers. London: BBC Books. ISBN 978-0-563-55183-6.
- Rigelsford, Adrian (1996). Carry On Laughing – a celebration. London: Virgin. ISBN 1-85227-554-5.
- Hibbin, Sally & Nina (1988). What a Carry On. London: Hamlyn. ISBN 978-0-600-55819-4.
- Eastaugh, Kenneth (1978). The Carry On Book. London: David & Charles. ISBN 978-0-7153-7403-0.
