= Norman Hudis =

British writer (1922–2016)

Norman Hudis (27 July 1922 – 8 February 2016) was an English writer for film, theatre and television, and is most closely associated with the first six of the Carry On... film series, for which he wrote the screenplays until he was replaced by Talbot Rothwell.

== Life and career ==
Born in Stepney, London, the son of Jewish immigrants Isaac, a tailor, and Polly (née Reuben), Hudis attended Betts Street School.

Hudis began his writing career on a local newspaper, the Hampstead & Highgate Express. When World War II broke out, Hudis joined the RAF and served in the Middle East writing for Air Force News. Like many other post-war writers his first foray into entertainment was writing for camp concerts. After the war, Hudis failed to get another job at a newspaper and joined The Rank Organisation in their Pictorial Publicity department, where he learned about filmmaking. In his spare time, he decided to become a playwright, but only his first play Here Is The News met with critical success. This was enough to get him noticed by Earl St John at Rank's Pinewood Studios, who offered him a job as trainee screenwriter. During the two years he was tutored by Julian Wintle but failed to get any of his screenplays into production.

Hudis left Pinewood and became a freelance writer and was soon to become a prolific screenwriter of B movies during the 1950s. His break was given him by Monty Berman and Robert S. Baker, an association that lasted for a couple of years. He was hired by Peter Rogers as the writer for the biopic The Tommy Steele Story (1957). The film's success secured him a contract with Sydney Box but Hudis was often loaned to Box's brother-in-law Rogers, writing another screenplay for Tommy Steele (The Duke Wore Jeans, 1958), which was directed by Gerald Thomas. The producer and director team of Peter and Gerald chose Hudis to rewrite the screenplay to R. F. Delderfield's The Bull Boys. He obliged and the screenplay became the first of the Carry On... film series as Carry On Sergeant. Hudis eventually became contracted to Rogers. Following the success of this Carry On début, Hudis wrote a further five Carry Ons (Carry On Nurse; Carry On Teacher; Carry On Constable; Carry On Regardless and Carry On Cruising) the highpoint being his second, Carry On Nurse, which was the UK's top-grossing film of 1959. Hudis decided to move permanently to the United States in 1966 as he had received offers of work following the successful American release of Carry On Nurse. His American television writing credits include, The Wild Wild West, The F.B.I., The Man From U.N.C.L.E., Hawaii Five-O, Cannon and Baretta.

Hudis continued to write for film, TV and theatre. He was the co-writer of the long-running play Seven Deadly Sins Four Deadly Sinners, which has played around the world since 2003, and he also wrote the one-man play Jeffrey Archer's Prison Diaries by FF 8282, the authorised adaptation of Jeffrey Archer's diaries which were written during his incarceration, both of which are produced by Marc Sinden Productions. He also wrote the semi-autobiographical play Dinner with Ribbentrop about his time working with the notoriously anti-Semitic actor Eric Portman. He died at the age of 93 on 8 February 2016. His son, Stephen R. Hudis is an actor and stunt coordinator. His sister Sylvia Holness [Hudis] lives in England. In 2008 Norman Hudis wrote his autobiography No Laughing Matter: How I Carried On, published by Apex Publishing Ltd.

== Selected filmography ==
- Breakaway (1955)
- Passport to Treason (1956)
- Bond of Fear (1956)
- High Terrace (1956)
- West of Suez (1957)
- The Crooked Sky (1957)
- Hour of Decision (1957)
- The Tommy Steele Story (1957)
- Face in the Night (1957)
- Stranger in Town (1957)
- The Duke Wore Jeans (1958)
- Mark of the Phoenix (1958)
- Please Turn Over (1959)
- No Kidding (1960)
- Twice Round the Daffodils (1962)
- Nurse on Wheels (1963)
- Mister Ten Per Cent (1967)
- The Karate Killers (1967)
- How to Steal the World (1968)
- A Monkey's Tale (1999)

Preceded by First	Carry On films scriptwriter 1958 - 1962	Succeeded by Talbot Rothwell
