= Jeffrey Archer's Prison Diaries =

Play by Jeffrey Archer

- Original language: English
- Written by: Norman Hudis, from Jeffrey Archer's diaries
- Characters: 1
- Subject: Life inside an English jail in the 20th century
- Genre: One-man play

Jeffrey Archer's Prison Diaries by FF 8282 is the authorised theatrical adaptation of Jeffrey Archer's three-volume diary of his time in jail (which was published as A Prison Diary). "FF 8282" was Archer's prisoner number while incarcerated.

Adapted and written by Norman Hudis as a one-man play, it was to be presented by West End theatre producer Marc Sinden.
