= Terry Scott =

English actor and comedian (1927–1994)

- Terry Scott
- Born: Owen John Scott; 4 May 1927; Watford, Hertfordshire, England
- Died: 26 July 1994 (aged 67); Witley, Surrey, England
- Occupations: Actor, comedian
- Years active: 1957-1994
- Spouses: Mary Howard (m. 1949; div. 1957) Margaret Peden (m. 1957)
- Children: 5

Terry Scott (born Owen John Scott; 4 May 1927 – 26 July 1994) was an English actor and comedian who appeared in seven of the Carry On films. He is also well known for appearing in the BBC1 sitcoms Happy Ever After and Terry and June with June Whitfield.

== Early life ==
Scott was born and brought up in Watford, Hertfordshire, and educated at Watford Field Junior School and Watford Grammar School for Boys. He was the youngest of three children, and the only surviving son after his brother Aubrey died when Scott was six. After National Service in the Navy at the end of the Second World War, he briefly studied accounting.

== Career ==
Scott began his acting career with appearances on radio shows such as Workers Playtime, which were followed by appearances on television. He gained an opportunity to perform in farce when he joined the Whitehall Theatre Company. With Bill Maynard he appeared at Butlin's Holiday Camp in Skegness, Lincolnshire and partnered him in the TV series Great Scott - It's Maynard!. During the 1960s he appeared alongside Hugh Lloyd in Hugh and I (1962–1967). They both appeared as Ugly Sisters in pantomime at The London Palladium; Scott reappeared in later years in the same role alongside Julian Orchard. Scott and Lloyd later appeared in Hugh and I Spy (1968) and, as gnomes, in the sitcom The Gnomes of Dulwich (1969).

In 1966 Scott was nominated for the BAFTA TV Award for Best Light Entertainment Performance, for his performances on Scott on Birds; Scott on Money; Scott on Food; Hugh and I; and Christmas Night with the Stars.

Scott's novelty record "My Brother" (written by Mitch Murray, and released in 1962 on Parlophone) was based on a schoolboy character (he dressed in school uniform to sing it on TV). In the 1970s he had a role in TV commercials for Curly Wurly caramel bars, in which he again appeared dressed as a schoolboy, with short trousers and cap. He repeated this performance several times on BBC TV's long-running variety show The Good Old Days. Scott had played a small role in the very first of the Carry On films series of films, Carry On Sergeant in 1958. In 1968 he returned to the series with a role in Carry On Up the Khyber (1968), playing main roles in six of the later films.

Scott starred alongside June Whitfield in several series of the comedy Happy Ever After and its successor Terry and June. They had first worked together making a series of the sketch show Scott On (1968). They also featured in supporting roles together (as a couple) in the film version of Bless This House. Although both Scott and Whitfield made several Carry On appearances, they never appeared in the same film. From 1981 to 1992, Scott was the voice of Penfold the hamster in the animated series Danger Mouse.

== Personal life and death ==
Scott suffered from ill health for several years in the latter part of his life. In 1979, he had a life-saving operation after a brain haemorrhage. He also suffered from creeping paralysis and had to wear a neck brace.

Scott was also diagnosed with cancer in 1987 and besides voicing Penfold, gradually wound down his performing career. He died from its effects at his family home in Witley, Surrey, on 26 July 1994, at the age of 67. He said of his last illness: "I know it would be better to give up the booze, fags and birds, but life would be so boring, wouldn't it?"

When Terry and June ended in 1987, Scott suffered a nervous breakdown. The breakdown was in part brought on by his public confession that he had indulged in a series of affairs since his marriage to dancer Margaret Peden in 1957. The couple had four daughters.

== Filmography ==
Year	Title	Role	Notes
1957	Blue Murder at St Trinian's	Police Sergeant	
1958	Carry On Sergeant	Sergeant O'Brian	
1959	Too Many Crooks	Fire Policeman James Smith	
1959	The Bridal Path	Police Constable Donald	
1959	I'm All Right Jack	Crawley	
1960	And the Same to You	Police Constable	
1961	The Night We Got the Bird	P. C. Lovejoy	
1961	Nearly a Nasty Accident	Sam Stokes	
1961	Double Bunk	2nd River Policeman	
1961	Mary Had a Little...	Police Sergeant	
1961	No My Darling Daughter	Constable	
1961	Nothing Barred	P. C. Budgie	
1961	What a Whopper	Sergeant	
1962	A Pair of Briefs	Policeman at Law Courts	
1964	Father Came Too!	Executioner	
1964	Murder Most Foul	Police Constable Wells	
1965	Gonks Go Beat	PM	
1966	Doctor in Clover	Robert	
1966	The Great St. Trinian's Train Robbery	Policeman	
1967	A Ghost of a Chance	Mr. Perry	
1968	Carry On Up the Khyber	Sergeant Major MacNutt	
1969	Carry On Camping	Peter Potter	
1970	Carry On Up the Jungle	Cecil The Jungle Boy	
1970	Carry On Loving	Terence Philpott	
1971	Carry On Henry	Cardinal Wolsey	
1971	Carry On at Your Convenience	Mr. Allcock	Scenes deleted
1972	Carry On Matron	Dr. Prodd	
1972	Bless This House	Ronald Baines	

== Discography ==
- "Don't Light The Fire 'Til After Santa's Gone" / "My Brother", Parlophone R 4967 (December 1962)

== Stage work ==
Scott’s career extended beyond television and film into a substantial body of stage work, particularly in British farce and traditional pantomime. He appeared regularly in West End comedies and in major pantomime seasons, including several productions at the London Palladium, and toured widely in farces such as A Bedfull of Foreigners and Run for Your Wife.

Selected theatre credits
Years	Production	Role	Venue / Company	Notes
1966–1967	Cinderella	Ugly Sister	London Palladium	Listed in contemporary Palladium pantomime material as one of the Ugly Sisters, alongside Hugh Lloyd, in the 1966–67 production of Cinderella.
1970	Aladdin	Pantomime cast	London Palladium	Recalled by director Christopher Luscombe as part of the 1970 Palladium production of Aladdin, in which Scott performed a celebrated comic “striptease” routine.
1971–1972	Cinderella	Ugly Sister	London Palladium	Photographic archive shows Scott and Julian Orchard as the Ugly Sisters in Cinderella at the London Palladium in December 1971; pantomime listings note Scott and Orchard as Ugly Sisters in the 1972 season.
1974	A Bedfull of Foreigners	Stanley Parker	Ashcroft Theatre, Croydon	World premiere production of Dave Freeman’s farce, 19 February – 2 March 1974, with Scott originating the role of Stanley Parker; the planned transfer to Bournemouth Pavilion was cancelled due to Scott’s throat infection.
1976–1977	A Bedfull of Foreigners	Stanley Parker	Victoria Palace Theatre and Duke of York’s Theatre, London	West End run of the farce, produced by Triumph Theatre Productions and Pieter Toerien, at the Victoria Palace (8 April – September 1976) and Duke of York’s Theatre (4 October 1976 – 11 June 1977), with Scott starring as Stanley Parker alongside June Whitfield; also documented in contemporary programmes and rehearsal photography.
1980	A Bedfull of Foreigners	Stanley Parker	Theatre Royal, Newcastle	Photographic record shows Scott and Anita Graham in a scene from A Bedfull of Foreigners at the Theatre Royal, Newcastle, dated 16 September 1980, indicating his continued association with the play on tour.
1980s	Run for Your Wife	John Smith / Stanley Gardner (various casts)	Shaftesbury, Criterion, Whitehall, Aldwych and Duchess Theatres, London	During the long West End run of Ray Cooney’s farce, Scott appeared in multiple casts in the 1980s, playing the bigamist taxi driver John Smith in some engagements and the neighbour Stanley Gardner in others; cast lists on Cooney’s official site and contemporary commentary link Scott closely with the play.
1985	Jack and the Beanstalk	Pantomime cast	Theatre Royal, Bath	Director Christopher Luscombe recalls appearing with Scott in a production of Jack and the Beanstalk at the Theatre Royal, Bath, at Christmas 1985, highlighting Scott’s continued prominence as a pantomime performer into the mid-1980s.
