= Jacki Piper =

English actress (born 1946)

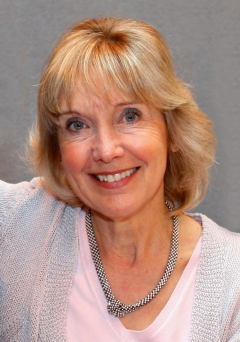
- Jacki Piper at the NEC in Birmingham, March 2009
- Born: Jacqueline Crump; 3 August 1946 (age 80); Birmingham, Warwickshire, England
- Occupation: Actor
- Years active: 1967–present
- Spouse: Douglas Barrell (m. 1970)
- Children: 2

Jacqueline Crump (born 3 August 1946), known professionally by her stage name Jacki Piper, is an English actress, best known for her appearances as the female juvenile lead in the British film comedies Carry On Up the Jungle (1970), Carry On Loving (1970), Carry On at Your Convenience (1971), and Carry On Matron (1972).

== Career ==
Born in Birmingham, she trained at the Birmingham Theatre School. Her career began on stage in the mid-1960s, playing in repertory theatre in Rhyl, Wales, where she was billed as Jackie Crump. Her film career began with an appearance with Roger Moore in the film The Man Who Haunted Himself in 1970. Her other film roles not already mentioned include Doctor in Trouble (1970) and The Love Ban (1973). For her film roles she decided to use a stage name, becoming Jacki Piper.

Additionally she has had roles in several television series, including Z-Cars, the situation comedy The Fall and Rise of Reginald Perrin (in which she played the recurring role of market researcher Esther Pigeon), and Dangerfield.

Her other UK television roles include Thriller, playing the Bride in the episode "Night Is the Time for Killing" (18 January 1975); Return of the Saint, playing Sally in the episode "Tower Bridge Is Falling Down" (10 December 1978); Backup, playing Jury Foreman in the episode "Touched" (11 June 1997); Barbara, playing Angela Croft in the episode "Neighbours" (2 March 2003); and Wire in the Blood, playing Mrs Davis in the episode "Still She Cries" (19 January 2004).

In theatre she has starred in many West End productions and UK and international tours.

Piper still acts in TV, film and theatre, and regularly attends Carry On events.

She currently lives with her husband in Richmond, Surrey; they have two sons.

== Filmography ==
Year	Title	Role	Notes
1970	Carry On Up the Jungle	June	
1970	The Man Who Haunted Himself	Secretary	Uncredited
1970	Doctor in Trouble	Cockney Girl	
1970	The Man Who Had Power Over Women	Receptionist	
1970	Carry On Loving	Sally Martin	
1971	Carry On at Your Convenience	Myrtle Plummer	
1972	Carry On Matron	Sister	
1973	The Love Ban	Pregnant Girl	
1986	Mr. Love	Ida	
2012	Run for Your Wife	Nurse	

== Television credits ==
Year	Title	Role	Notes
1967	Softly, Softly	Mary Rhys	Episode: "Appointment in Wyvern"
1969	Galton and Simpson Comedy	Avril	Episode: "Don't Dilly Dally on the Way"
1969	The Very Merry Widow and How	Karen Ornskoldsvikson	Episode: "How to Lose Friends and Not Influence People"
1973	Softly, Softly: Task Force	June	Episode: "Conspiracy"
1973	Men of Affairs	Enid Rudge	Episode: "Desirable Residence"
1974	Z-Cars	Beth Bramley	Episode: "Intruder"
1974	Look: Mike Yarwood	Various	Episode: #4.3
1974–1976	The Dick Emery Show	Various	3 episodes
1975	Thriller	Bride	Episode: "Murder on the Midnight Express"
1975	The Two Ronnies	Miss Willow	3 episodes
1975	The Rough with the Smooth	Helen	Episode: #1.4
1975	Hogg's Back	Pearl	7 episodes
1976–1977	The Fall and Rise of Reginald Perrin	Esther Pigeon	2 episodes
1978	Return of the Saint	Sally	Episode: "Tower Bridge is Falling Down"
1980	Kelly Monteith	Grace	Episode: #2.5
1991	The Bill	Mrs Leston	Episode: "Turning Back the Clock"
1995	Dangerfield	Mrs Talbot	Episode: "The Norfolk Holiday: Part 1"
1997	Backup	Jury Foreman	Episode: "Touched"
1997	Strange but True?	Daphne and Barbara Jacobson	Episode: "Twin Co-Incidences"
1997	The Bill	Mrs Cox	Episode: "Accomplice"
1998	The Things You Do for Love	Doreen	TV film
2000	Take a Girl Like You	Mrs Bunn	Episode: "Part Two"
2002	Doctors	Lesley	Episode: "Relative Concerns"
2003	Barbara	Angela Croft	Episode: "Neighbours"
2004	Wire in the Blood	Mrs Davis	Episode: "Still She Cries"
2023	Nolly	Barbara	Episode: #1.2

== Stage work ==
Piper trained at the Birmingham Theatre School and began her professional career in repertory theatre before moving into West End, touring and pantomime productions.

Selected theatre credits
Year	Production	Role	Venue / Company	Notes
—	The Tempest	Miranda	Repertory theatre	Early stage role
—	Billy Liar	Liz	Repertory theatre	Early stage role
—	The Birthday Party	Lulu	Repertory theatre	Early stage role
—	The Servant of Two Masters	Smeraldina	Repertory theatre	Early stage role
1969	Halfway up the Tree	Judy	UK Tour	Touring production
c.1970	The Secretary Bird	Molly Forsythe	Savoy Theatre, London	West End production
1971	Big Bad Mouse	Fiona Jones	Prince of Wales Theatre, London	West End production
1995	Don't Dress for Dinner	Jacqueline	Duchess Theatre, London	West End production
1968	Dear Charles	Martine	Duke of York's Theatre, London	West End production
1971	No Sex Please – We're British	Frances Hunter	Garrick Theatre, London	West End production
1983	Run for Your Wife	Mary Smith	Criterion Theatre, London	West End production
2005	Stage Struck	Anne	Swansea Grand Theatre	Regional theatre
2009	A Spell of Cold Weather	Betty	Orange Tree Theatre, Richmond	Regional theatre
2001	The Maintenance Man	Chris	Mill at Sonning	Regional theatre
2003	A Bedfull of Foreigners	Helga	Mill at Sonning / Far East tour	Also toured internationally
—	The Happy Apple	—	Richmond	Regional theatre
1969	Move Over Mrs Markham	Sylvia	Richmond	Regional theatre
—	Not Now Darling	—	Guildford	Regional theatre
2006	It Runs in the Family	Matron	UK tour	Touring production
—	Hobson’s Choice	Maggie Hobson	UK tour	Touring production
1967	Boeing Boeing	Judith	UK tour	Touring production
2013	Marry Me – You Idiot!	April	Jermyn Street Theatre	London premiere
2014	When We Are Married	Annie Parker	UK tour	Touring production
—	Cinderella	Fairy Godmother	Various UK theatres	Pantomime
