= Carry On Up the Khyber =

1968 British comedy film by Gerald Thomas

- Original UK quad poster by Renato Fratini
- Directed by: Gerald Thomas
- Written by: Talbot Rothwell
- Produced by: Peter Rogers
- Starring: Sid James; Kenneth Williams; Charles Hawtrey; Roy Castle; Joan Sims; Angela Douglas; Terry Scott; Bernard Bresslaw; Peter Butterworth
- Cinematography: Ernest Steward
- Edited by: Alfred Roome
- Music by: Eric Rogers
- Distributed by: The Rank Organisation
- Release date: 28 November 1968
- Running time: 88 minutes
- Country: United Kingdom
- Language: English
- Budget: £235,637

Carry On Up the Khyber is a 1968 British comedy film, the 16th in the series of 31 Carry On films (1958–1992). It stars Carry On regulars Sid James, Kenneth Williams, Charles Hawtrey, Joan Sims, Bernard Bresslaw and Peter Butterworth. It is the second of two Carry On film appearances by Wanda Ventham; and Roy Castle makes his only Carry On appearance, in the romantic male lead part usually played by Jim Dale.

Angela Douglas makes her fourth and final appearance in the series. Terry Scott returned to the series after his minor role in the first film of the series, Carry On Sergeant a decade earlier. The film is, in part, a spoof of Kiplingesque movies and television series about life in the British Raj, both contemporary and from earlier, Hollywood, periods. The title is a play on words in the risqué Carry On tradition, with "Khyber" (short for "Khyber Pass") being rhyming slang for "arse". The film was followed by Carry On Camping (1969).

== Plot ==
Sir Sidney Ruff-Diamond is Queen Victoria's Governor in the British Indian province of Kalabar near the Khyber Pass. The province is defended by the feared 3rd Foot and Mouth Regiment, who are said to not wear anything under their kilts. When a soldier, the inept Private Widdle, is found wearing underpants after an encounter with the warlord Bungdit Din, chief of the warlike Burpa tribe, the Khasi of Kalabar plans to use this information to incite a rebellion in Kalabar. He aims to dispel the "tough" image of the "Devils in Skirts" by revealing that, contrary to popular belief, they actually wear underpants underneath their kilts.

A diplomatic operation ensues on the part of the British, who fail to publicly prove that the incident was an aberration. In a subsequent inspection all soldiers present are found wearing underpants, prompting the Governor to issue a related command invoking the military manual. Meanwhile, the Governor's wife, in the hope of luring the Khasi into bed, takes a photograph of the inspection and takes it to him. With this hard evidence in hand, the Khasi would be able to muster a ferocious Afghani invasion force, storm the Khyber Pass and capture India from the British; but Lady Ruff-Diamond insists that he sleep with her before she parts with the photograph. He delays on account of her unattractiveness, eventually taking her away with him to Bungdit Din's palace. Meanwhile, the Khasi's daughter, Princess Jelhi, reveals to the British Captain Keene, with whom she has fallen in love, that the Governor's wife has eloped, and a team is dispatched to ensure the return of both her and the photograph.

Disguised as Afghani generals and guided by Brother Belcher, a preacher whom they extort with the cooperation of a young woman, the interlopers are brought into the palace and, at the Khasi's suggestion, are introduced to Bungdit Din's sultry concubines. Whilst enjoying the women in the harem, they are unmasked amid a farcical orgy, imprisoned, and scheduled to be executed at sunset alongside the Governor's wife. Princess Jelhi aids their escape by disguising them as dancing girls, but during the entertaining of the Afghani generals, the Khasi, contemptuous of an annoying fakir's performance, demands that he see the dancing girls instead. After their disguises are seen through, the British and the Princess flee, but Lady Ruff-Diamond drops the photograph on leaving the palace through the gardens. The group returns to the Khyber Pass to find its guards massacred and their weapons comically mutilated, in a rare (albeit tainted) moment of poignancy.

All attempts to hold off the advancing Afghani invaders fail miserably, and a hasty retreat is beaten to the Residency. The Governor, meanwhile, has been entertaining, in numerical order, the Khasi's fifty-one wives, each one of them wishing to "right the wrong" that his own wife and the Khasi himself have supposedly committed against him. After a browbeating from his wife, Sir Sidney calls a crisis meeting regarding the invasion, in which he resolves to "do nothing"—until it is too late, as his aide notes. A black tie dinner is arranged for that evening. Dinner takes place during a prolonged penultimate scene, with contrapuntal snippets of the Khasi's army demolishing the Residency's exterior, and the officers and ladies ignoring the devastation as they dine amongst themselves. Shells shaking the building and plaster falling into the soup do not interrupt dinner, even when the fakir's severed – but still talking – head is served, courtesy of the Khasi. Only Brother Belcher fails to display a stiff upper lip, and breaks his calm by panicking.

Finally, at Captain Keene's suggestion, the gentlemen walk outside to be greeted by a bloody battle being waged in the courtyard. Still dressed in black tie, Sir Sidney orders the Regiment to form a line and lift their kilts, this time exposing their (implied) lack of underwear. The invading Afghani army is terrified, and retreats at once. The gentlemen walk back inside to resume dinner, whilst Brother Belcher notices the Union Jack flown by the governor bearing the slogan I'm Backing Britain and calls them "raving mad".

== Cast ==
- Sid James as Sir Sidney Ruff-Diamond
- Kenneth Williams as the Khasi of Kalabar
- Charles Hawtrey as Private James Widdle
- Roy Castle as Captain Keene
- Joan Sims as Lady Joan Ruff-Diamond
- Bernard Bresslaw as Bungdit Din
- Peter Butterworth as Brother Belcher
- Terry Scott as Sergeant Major MacNutt
- Angela Douglas as Princess Jelhi
- Cardew Robinson as the fakir
- Peter Gilmore as Private Ginger Hale
- Julian Holloway as Major Shorthouse
- Leon Thau as Stinghi
- Michael Mellinger as Chindi
- Wanda Ventham as the Khasi's first wife
- Alexandra Dane as Busti

== Production ==
=== Writing ===
The screenplay was written by Talbot Rothwell. Peter Rogers had liked Rothwell's writing so much after he had submitted the script for Carry On Jack that he asked him to become the Carry On staff writer; Rothwell wrote a further nineteen Carry On films.

The film's fictional Highland infantry regiment of the British Army was known as the 3rd Foot and Mouth Regiment. It is a regiment of Highlanders, known locally as "the Devils in Skirts" for their tradition of not wearing anything beneath their kilts. The regimental tartans and bonnet badges designed for the unnamed Highland regiment in the 1960 film Tunes of Glory were rented for the production to kit out Carry On Up the Khyber's 3rd Foot and Mouth Regiment. The pith helmets and webbing were borrowed from the 1964 classic war film, Zulu.

=== Filming ===
The movie was shot between 8 April and 31 May 1968. Interiors were filmed at Pinewood Studios, Buckinghamshire. Heatherden Hall, the administrative offices of Pinewood Studios, was used as the governor's residence.

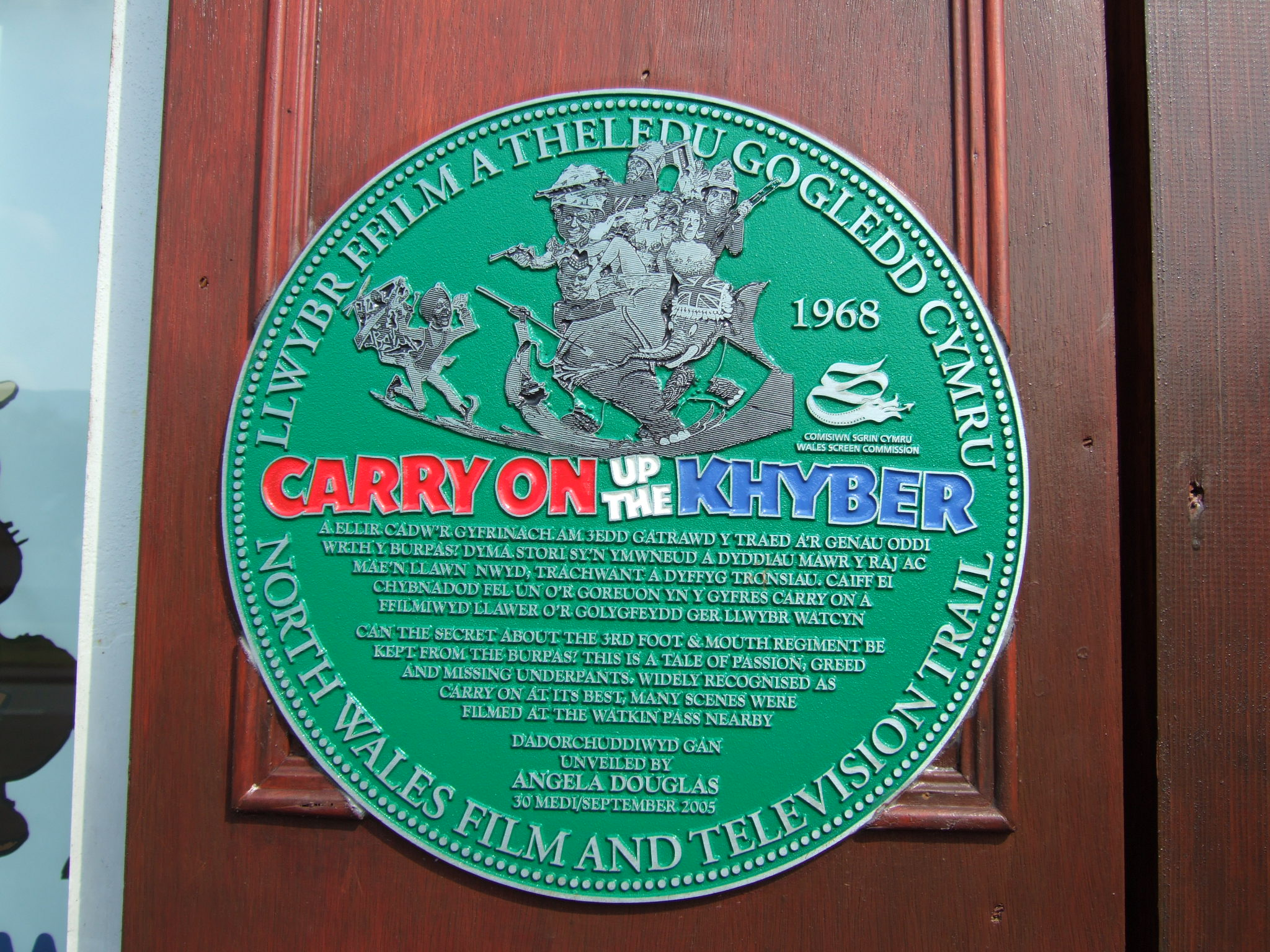
A plaque in Llanberis, Wales, commemorates the filming of Carry On Up the Khyber

The scenes on the North West Frontier were filmed beneath the summit of Snowdon in North Wales. The lower part of the Watkin Path was used as the Khyber Pass with garrison and border gate. In September 2005, a plaque was unveiled in Snowdonia to commemorate the film and the location.

== Release ==
The film was the second most popular movie at the UK box office in 1969.

== Reception ==
Carry On... Up the Khyber is frequently cited as the best entry in the series. Colin MacCabe, Professor of English at the University of Exeter, labelled this film (together with Carry On Cleo) as one of the best films of all time.

In 1999, it was placed 99th on the BFI's list of greatest British films ever made.

In a 2018 retrospective on the series, the British Film Institute named Carry On Up the Khyber as one of the series' five best films, alongside Carry On Cleo (1964), Carry On Screaming! (1966), Carry On Camping (1969), and Carry On Matron (1972).
