= Carry On Cleo =

1964 British comedy film by Gerald Thomas

- Original UK quad poster
- Directed by: Gerald Thomas
- Written by: Talbot Rothwell
- Produced by: Peter Rogers
- Starring: Sidney James; Kenneth Williams; Kenneth Connor; Charles Hawtrey; Joan Sims; Jim Dale; Amanda Barrie
- Cinematography: Alan Hume
- Edited by: Archie Ludski
- Music by: Eric Rogers
- Distributed by: Anglo-Amalgamated
- Release date: 10 December 1964
- Running time: 92 minutes
- Country: United Kingdom
- Language: English
- Budget: £165,802

Carry On Cleo is a 1964 British historical comedy film, the tenth in the series of 31 Carry On films (1958–1992). Regulars Sid James, Kenneth Williams, Kenneth Connor, Charles Hawtrey, and Jim Dale are present and Connor made his last appearance until his return in Carry On Up the Jungle six years later. Joan Sims returned to the series for the first time since Carry On Regardless three years earlier. Sims would now appear in every Carry On up to Carry On Emmannuelle in 1978, making her the most prolific actress in the series. Jon Pertwee makes the first of his four appearances in the series. The title role is played by Amanda Barrie in her second and last Carry On. Along with Carry On Sergeant and Carry On Screaming!, its original posters were reproduced by the Royal Mail on stamps to celebrate the 50th anniversary of the Carry On series in June 2008. The film was followed by Carry On Cowboy (1965).

It is often regarded as the best in the series.

== Plot ==
The film opens during Caesar's invasions of Britain, with Mark Antony struggling to lead his armies through miserable weather. At a nearby village, cavemen Horsa and Hengist Pod attempt to alert Boudica to the invasion, but are captured by the Romans.

Once in Rome, Horsa is sold by the slave-trading firm Marcus et Spencius, and Hengist is destined to be thrown to the lions when no-one agrees to buy him. Horsa and Hengist escape and take refuge in the Temple of Vesta. Whilst hiding there, Julius Caesar arrives to consult the Vestal Virgins, but an attempt is made on his life by his bodyguard, Bilius. In the melee, Horsa kills Bilius and escapes, leaving Hengist to take the credit for saving Caesar's life and to be made Caesar's new bodyguard.

When a power struggle emerges in Egypt, Mark Antony is sent to force Cleopatra to abdicate in favour of Ptolemy. However, Mark Antony becomes besotted with her, and instead kills Ptolemy off-screen to win her favour. Cleopatra convinces Mark Antony to kill Caesar and become ruler of Rome himself so that they may rule a powerful Roman-Egyptian alliance together. After seducing one another, Mark Antony agrees, and plots to kill Caesar.

Caesar and Hengist travel to Egypt on a galley, along with Agrippa, whom Mark Antony has convinced to kill Caesar. However, Horsa has been re-captured and is now a slave on Caesar's galley. After killing the galley-master, Horsa and the galley slaves kill Agrippa and his fellow assassins and swim to Egypt. Hengist, who had been sent out to fight Agrippa and was unaware of Horsa's presence on board, again takes the credit.

Once at Cleopatra's palace, an Egyptian soothsayer warns Caesar of the plot to kill him, but Mark Anthony persuades Caesar not to flee. Instead, Caesar convinces Hengist to change places with him, since Cleopatra and Caesar have never met. On meeting, Cleopatra lures Hengist, who accidentally exposes both Cleopatra and Mark Anthony as would-be assassins. He and Caesar then ally with Horsa, and after defeating Cleopatra's bodyguard Sosages in combat, Hengist and the party flee Egypt. Caesar is returned to Rome, only to be assassinated on the Ides of March. Horsa and Hengist return to Britain, and Mark Antony is left in Egypt to live "one long Saturday night" with Cleopatra.

== Background notes ==
The costumes and sets used in the film were originally intended for Cleopatra (1963) at Pinewood Studios before that production moved to Rome and rebuilt new sets there. Carry On Cleo was filmed between 13 July and 28 August 1964.

The original poster and publicity artwork by Tom Chantrell were withdrawn from circulation after 20th Century Fox successfully brought a copyright infringement case against distributor Anglo-Amalgamated, which found the design was based on a painting by Howard Terpning for which Fox owned the copyright and was used to promote the Cleopatra film.

== Cast ==
- Sid James as Mark Antony
- Kenneth Williams as Julius Caesar
- Charles Hawtrey as Seneca
- Kenneth Connor as Hengist Pod
- Joan Sims as Calpurnia
- Jim Dale as Horsa
- Amanda Barrie as Cleopatra
- Victor Maddern as Sergeant Major
- Julie Stevens as Gloria
- Sheila Hancock as Senna Pod
- Jon Pertwee as Soothsayer
- Brian Oulton as Brutus
- Michael Ward as Archimedes
- Francis de Wolff as Agrippa
- Tom Clegg as Sosages
- Tanya Binning as Virginia
- David Davenport as Bilius
- Peter Gilmore as Galley master
- Ian Wilson as Messenger
- Norman Mitchell as Heckler
- Brian Rawlinson as Hessian driver
- Gertan Klauber as Marcus
- Warren Mitchell as Spencius
- Michael Nightingale as Caveman
- Peter Jesson as Companion
- E. V. H. Emmett as Narrator
- Judi Johnson as Gloria's bridesmaid (uncredited)
- Thelma Taylor as Seneca's servant (uncredited)
- Sally Douglas as Antony's dusky maiden (uncredited)
- Wanda Ventham as Pretty bidder (uncredited)
- Peggy Ann Clifford as Willa Claudia (uncredited)
- Mark Hardy as Guard at Caesar's palace (uncredited)
- Percy Herbert as Guard (uncredited)
- Christine Rodgers as Hand maiden (uncredited)
- Gloria Best as Hand maiden (uncredited)
- Virginia Tyler as Hand maiden (uncredited)
- Gloria Johnson as Vestal Virgin (uncredited)
- Joanna Ford as Vestal Virgin (uncredited)
- Donna White as Vestal Virgin (uncredited)
- Jane Lumb as Vestal Virgin (uncredited)
- Vicki Smith as Vestal Virgin (uncredited)

== Filming and locations ==
- Filming dates: 13 July – 28 August 1964

Interiors:

- Pinewood Studios, Buckinghamshire
- Chobham Common, Surrey

== Reception ==
The film premiered at London's Warner cinema on 10 December 1964 and went on to become one of the 12 most popular movies at the British box office in 1965.

Colin McCabe, Professor of English at the University of Exeter, labelled this film (together with Carry On Up the Khyber) as one of the best films of all time.

In 2007, the pun "Infamy, infamy, they've all got it in for me", spoken by Kenneth Williams, was voted the funniest one-line joke in film history. The line was not written by Rothwell but borrowed with permission from a Take It from Here script written by Frank Muir and Denis Norden.

In a 2018 retrospective on the series, the British Film Institute named Carry On Cleo as one of the series' five best films, alongside Carry On Screaming! (1966), Carry On Up the Khyber (1968), Carry On Camping (1969), and Carry On Matron (1972).

== Bibliography ==
- Davidson, Andy (2012). Carry On Confidential. London: Miwk. ISBN 978-1-908630-01-8.
- Sheridan, Simon (2011). Keeping the British End Up – Four Decades of Saucy Cinema. London: Titan Books. ISBN 978-0-85768-279-6.
- Webber, Richard (2009). 50 Years of Carry On. London: Arrow. ISBN 978-0-09-949007-4.
- Hudis, Norman (2008). No Laughing Matter. London: Apex. ISBN 978-1-906358-15-0.
- Keeping the British End Up: Four Decades of Saucy Cinema by Simon Sheridan (third edition) (2007) (Reynolds & Hearn Books)
- Ross, Robert (2002). The Carry On Companion. London: Batsford. ISBN 978-0-7134-8771-8.
- Bright, Morris; Ross, Robert (2000). Mr Carry On – The Life & Work of Peter Rogers. London: BBC Books. ISBN 978-0-563-55183-6.
- Rigelsford, Adrian (1996). Carry On Laughing – a celebration. London: Virgin. ISBN 1-85227-554-5.
- Hibbin, Sally & Nina (1988). What a Carry On. London: Hamlyn. ISBN 978-0-600-55819-4.
- Eastaugh, Kenneth (1978). The Carry On Book. London: David & Charles. ISBN 978-0-7153-7403-0.
