= Oozlefinch =

Unofficial mascot of various US army units

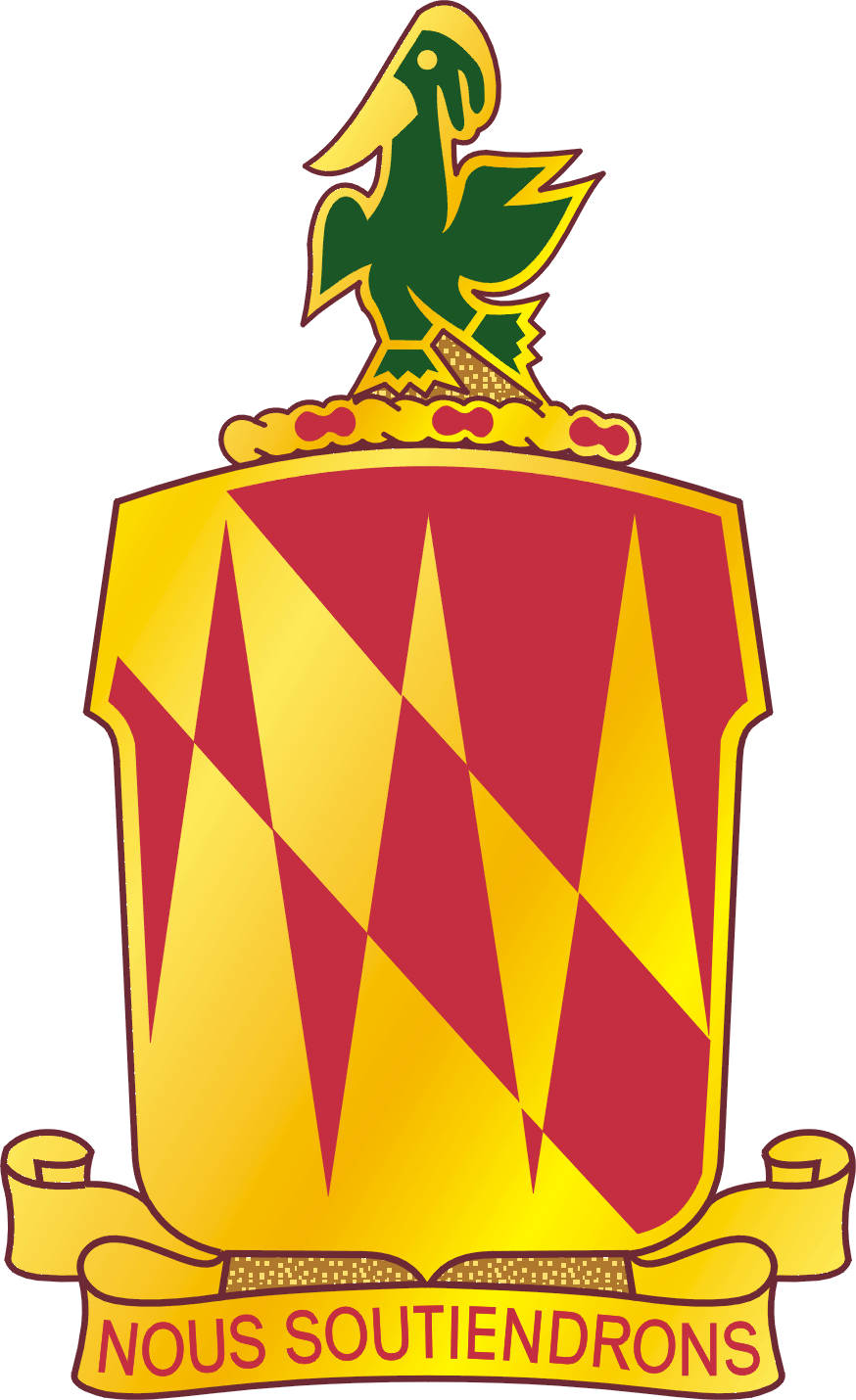
The Distinctive Unit Insignia of the 42nd Field Artillery Brigade (pictured) included an Oozlefinch, as did the patch of the Railway Artillery Reserve. The French motto "Nous Soutiendrons" means "We Shall Serve".

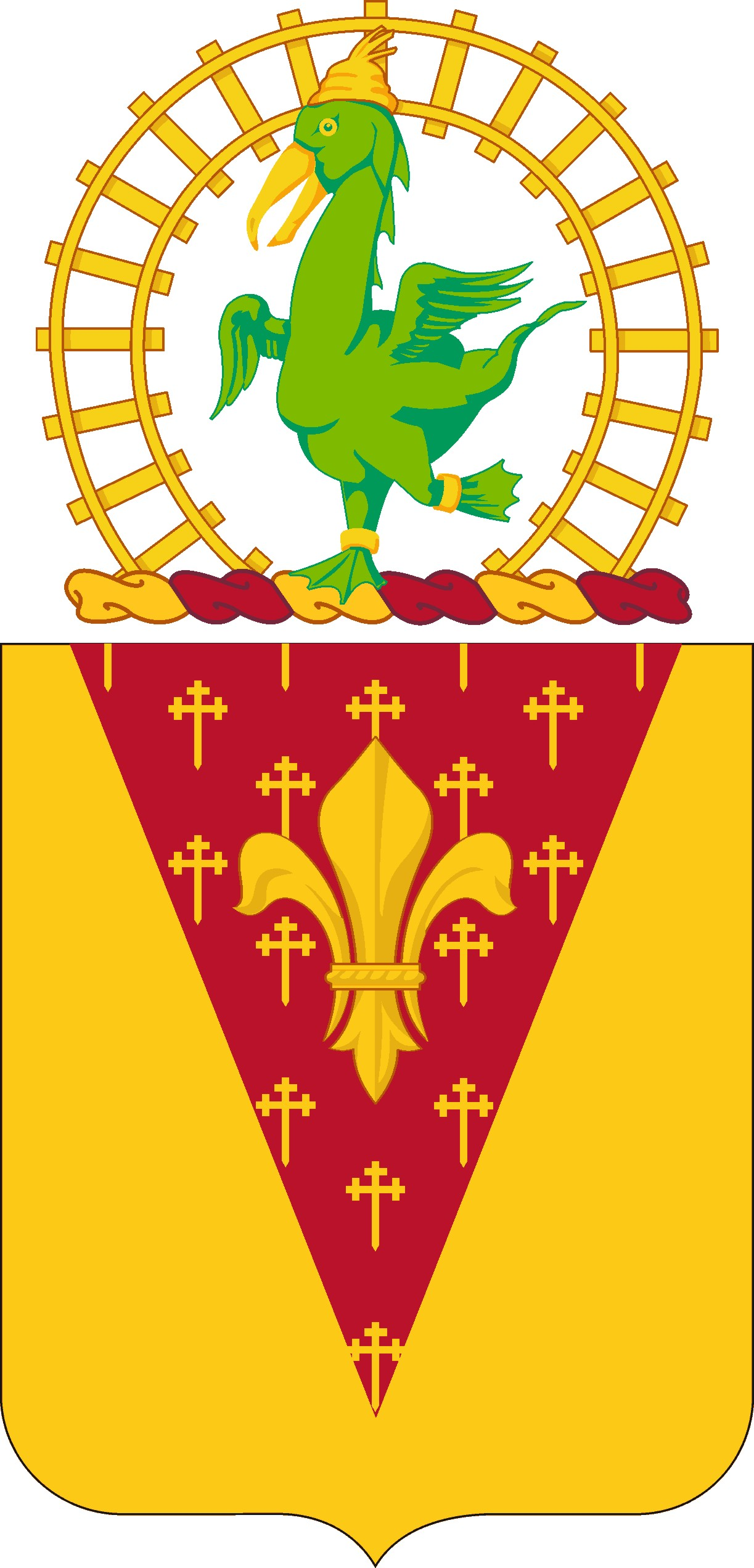
The crest of the 53rd Coast Artillery is the symbol of the Railway Artillery Reserve.

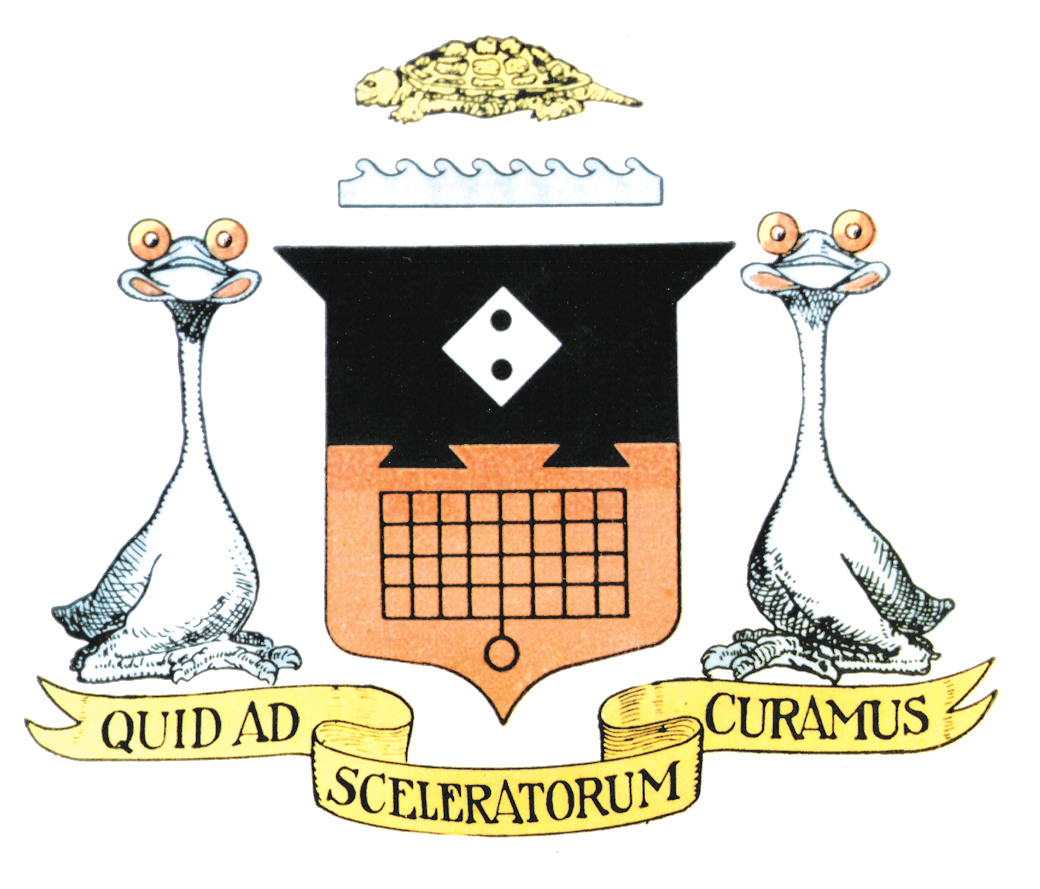
The Oozlefinch (unofficial) coat of arms from a 1957 military ceremony pamphlet. The Latin motto "Quid ad sceleratorum curamus" translates roughly as "What the hell do we care?"

The Oozlefinch is the unofficial historic mascot of the Air Defense Artillery – and formerly of the U.S. Army Coast Artillery Corps. The Oozlefinch is portrayed as a featherless bird that flies backwards (at supersonic speeds) and carries weapons of the Air Defense and Coast Artillery, most often a Nike-Hercules Missile. The Oozlefinch has been portrayed in many different forms and artistic interpretations through its history.

== History ==
There are many legends about the origins of the Oozlefinch. Most agree that the legend began in 1905 at Ft. Monroe, Virginia, then home of the Coast Artillery Corps. Captain Henry MacPherson Merriam, possibly under the effects of alcohol, first reported seeing a large-eyed, flight-challenged bird outside the officers' club. Soon more people reported seeing this bird, and sketches were made. Eventually, the legend of the bird would become so great that a statue was erected at the club in its honor.

The Oozlefinch was used on the insignia of the Railway Artillery Reserve during World War I; In some descriptions, this bird is a pelican. The Distinctive Unit Insignia of the 42nd Field Artillery Brigade later included the oozlefinch, describing the insignia as: "On a wreath of the colors (Or and Gules) an oozlefinch (from the shoulder sleeve insignia worn by the Railway Artillery Reserve in France) Vert, armed, capped and collared on the legs."

== Symbolism ==
The Oozlefinch's eyes are very large, allowing it to see very distant and very clearly in the sky. Its vision is unobstructed by eyelids or eyebrows, and the eyes are said to be able to turn 180 degrees so the Oozlefinch can look inward, symbolizing the need of a good leader for inward reflection.

=== Heraldry ===
The heraldic tradition of the Oozlefinch includes a coat of arms, the symbology of which is:

The body of the shield "parti per fess, dovetailed" indicates the general woodenness, not of the Artillery Board and the other members of the "Gridiron Club" but of the passing throng who paid not their toll cheerfully in passing through the Sanctum to the bar. "Gules and Sable:" The color of the shield is red and black-red for the Artillery, and black in mourning for those who lost at dice by throwing the lowest spots. "In honor, a deuce spot of dice, lozenged. proper:" The honor point of the shield was given to the lowest marked dice, as it was the one which most frequently appeared to some members, the law of probabilities to the contrary notwithstanding. "In nombril a gridiron sable:" the lower half of the shield given over to the memory of those who did not belong to the "Gridiron Club" but who were constantly roasted by it. The supporters, "two Oozlefinches, regardant, proper," were a natural selection, "regardant" meaning looking, or better, all-seeing, with the great eyes that this bird has to protect while in flight in the manner described.

The crest "a terrapin, passant dexter proper," was selected owing to the great number of these animals, cooked to perfection by Keeney Chapman and served with great pomp to the members of the Artillery Board on occasions of state. This was always accompanied by libations of "red top," red top being a now obsolete drink made in the Champagne Country of France and once imported to the United States, in times gone by that now seem almost prehistoric.

The wavy bar, over which the terrapin is passing, represents the adjacent waters of Chesapeake Bay, the natural habitat of this animal.

Matched Pair of Oozlefinches ca. 1951 by COL John R. M. Covert near Coast Artillery HQ, Fortress Monroe, VA

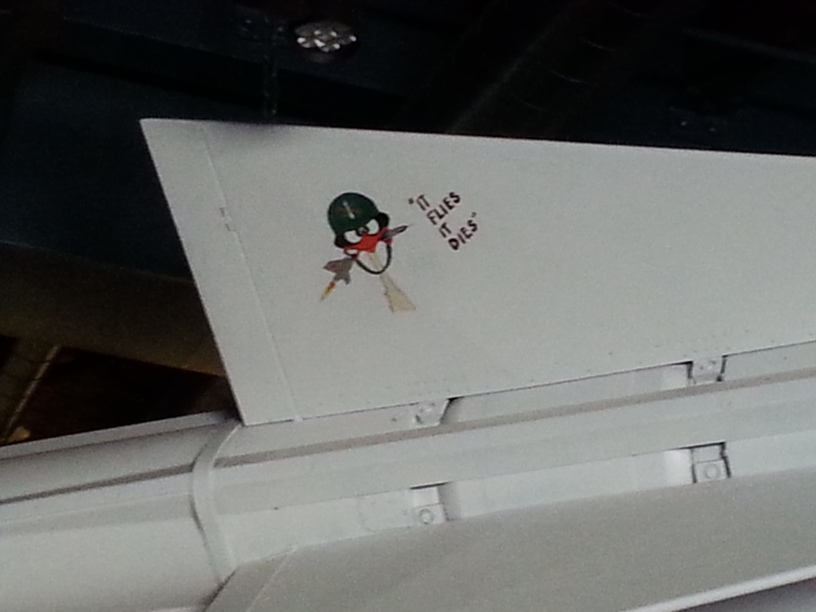
Oozlefinch depicted on a Nike-Ajax missile, Fort Warren, Massachusetts

== See also ==
- Air Defense Artillery
- Coastal Artillery
- Fort Bliss, Texas
- Fort Sill, Oklahoma
- Oozlum bird
- Ordnance Corps
- Saint Barbara, patron saint of artillerymen
- United States Army
