= Oozlum bird =

Legendary creature

External image
- Picture of the oozlum bird in Carry On Up the Jungle

The oozlum bird, also spelled ouzelum, is a legendary creature found in Australian and British folk tales and legends. Some versions have it that, when startled, the bird will take off and fly around in ever-decreasing circles until it manages to fly up its own backside, disappearing completely, which adds to its rarity. Other sources state that the bird flies backwards so that it can admire its own beautiful tail feathers, or because while it does not know where it is going, it likes to know where it has been.

The Oxford English Dictionary describes it as "[a] mythical bird displaying ridiculous behaviour" and speculates that the word could have been suggested by the word ouzel, meaning a blackbird (Turdus merula). The earliest citation recorded by the dictionary dates from 1858.

A variant of the oozlum, possibly a mutation, is the weejy weejy bird, which has only one wing which causes it to fly in tighter, faster, smaller circles, until it disappears up its own fundament. The oozlefinch is an American relative without feathers that flies backwards ("to keep dust, trivia, and other inconsequentia out of his eyes") at supersonic speeds, and preys on enemy bombers, which it rips from the sky. The oozlefinch has been adopted as the unofficial mascot of the United States Air Defense Artillery.

The oozlum bird was the subject of the 1970 British film Carry On Up the Jungle. There was also a recurring joke in an episode of the BBC Radio comedy, The Navy Lark that Lt Commander Murray (Stephen Murray) did not know what the oozlum bird was. Sub Lieutenant Phillips (Leslie Phillips) suggested that when young, oozlum birds fly straight, and it is only when they turn left that the trouble starts.

The oozlum bird is sometimes used as a symbol of self-reference and circular argumentation. For example, author Charles Seife wrote: "Like the mythical oozlum bird, Wikipedia seems to have the ability to fly around in ever decreasing circles until it flies right up its own rectum."

The fabulous qualities of the oozlum bird are the subject of a poem by W. T. Goodge (1862–1909). In the poem The Oozlum Bird, the bird is said to fly backwards and has the singular ability of being able to fly up in the air while letting the earth turn under it. The bird is said to be large enough to bear the weight of a man.

== See also ==
- Oozlefinch
