= Carry On Matron =

1972 British comedy film by Gerald Thomas

- Original UK quad poster
- Directed by: Gerald Thomas
- Written by: Talbot Rothwell
- Produced by: Peter Rogers
- Starring: Sid James; Kenneth Williams; Charles Hawtrey; Joan Sims; Hattie Jacques; Bernard Bresslaw; Kenneth Cope; Terry Scott; Barbara Windsor; Kenneth Connor
- Cinematography: Ernest Steward
- Edited by: Alfred Roome
- Music by: Eric Rogers
- Distributed by: The Rank Organisation
- Release date: 19 May 1972
- Running time: 87 mins
- Country: United Kingdom
- Language: English
- Budget: £220,257

Carry On Matron is a 1972 British comedy film, the 23rd release in the series of 31 Carry On films (1958–1992). It was released in May 1972. It was directed by Gerald Thomas and features series regulars Sid James, Kenneth Williams, Charles Hawtrey, Joan Sims, Hattie Jacques, Bernard Bresslaw, Barbara Windsor and Kenneth Connor. This was the last Carry On film for Terry Scott after appearing in seven films, Jacki Piper after appearing in four films, and for Kenneth Cope after appearing in two films.

Along with the next film in the series (Carry On Abroad, released later in 1972), it features the highest number of the regular Carry On team. The only regular members missing are Peter Butterworth – who was due to play Freddy but was unable to because of other work engagements – and Jim Dale. Butterworth returned in a major role in Abroad, and Dale would return belatedly for Carry On Columbus in 1992.

== Plot ==
Sid Carter is the cunning head of a criminal gang that includes the long-haired drip Ernie Bragg, the cheeky Freddy, and Sid's honest son, Cyril. Cyril does not want a life of crime, but is emotionally blackmailed by his father into going along with his scheme to rob Finisham Maternity Hospital of its stock of contraceptive pills and sell them abroad. Cyril reluctantly disguises himself as a new female nurse to case the hospital. Assumed to be one of the new student nurses who have just arrived, he is assigned to share a room with the shapely blonde nurse Susan Ball. Unfortunately for Cyril, he also catches the eye of the hospital lothario, Dr Prodd.

Sir Bernard Cutting, the hypochondriac registrar of the hospital, is convinced he's undergoing a sex change. When he consults the nutty Dr F. A. Goode, Goode dishes out psychiatric mumbo-jumbo, stating that Cutting merely wants to prove his manhood, and Cutting decides he is in love with Matron. Matron, on the other hand, has more than enough to contend with on the wards, with the gluttonous patient Mrs Tidey who seems more interested in eating than producing a baby, and her long-suffering British Rail worker husband who continually hangs around the waiting room.

When Cyril goes back to Prodd's room to get a map of the hospital, Prodd attempts to get intimate, only to be knocked across the room. Prodd and Cyril are called out on an emergency when lovely film star Jane Darling goes into labour, but as Cyril knocks Prodd out in the ambulance, he is forced to deal with the actress's triplets being born. Jane Darling is delighted with Cyril and hails "the nurse" a heroine for her efforts, bringing fame to the hospital. Susan uncovers Cyril's disguise, but as she is in love with him, does not reveal the truth.

The much put-upon Sister desperately tries to keep the ward in order, while Cutting's secretary, Miss Banks keeps her employer in check, but nothing can cool his pent-up desire to prove himself as a man, and it's Matron who's in his sights. The criminal gang don disguises—Sid dresses as the foreign "Dr Zhivago" and Ernie as a heavily expectant mum—but the crime is thwarted by the mothers-to-be. The medical hierarchy's threat to call the police is halted when Sid reveals the heroine of the day is a man, and the hospital realises they would suffer nationwide humiliation if anyone found out. Cyril weds his shapely nurse Susan, and Matron finally gets her doctor.

== Cast ==
- Sid James as Sid Carter
- Kenneth Williams as Sir Bernard Cutting
- Charles Hawtrey as Doctor Francis A Goode
- Hattie Jacques as Matron
- Joan Sims as Mrs Tidey
- Bernard Bresslaw as Ernie Bragg
- Barbara Windsor as Nurse Susan Ball
- Kenneth Connor as Mr Tidey
- Terry Scott as Doctor Prodd
- Kenneth Cope as Cyril Carter
- Jacki Piper as Sister
- Bill Maynard as Freddy
- Patsy Rowlands as Evelyn Banks
- Derek Francis as Arthur
- Amelia Bayntun as Mrs Jenkins
- Valerie Leon as Jane Darling
- Brian Osborne as ambulance driver
- Gwendolyn Watts as Frances Kemp
- Valerie Shute as Miss Smethurst
- Margaret Nolan as Mrs Tucker
- Michael Nightingale as Doctor Pearson
- Wendy Richard as Miss Willing
- Zena Clifton as au pair girl
- Bill Kenwright as reporter
- Robin Hunter as Mr Darling
- Jack Douglas as twitching father
- Madeline Smith as Mrs Pullitt
- Juliet Harmer as Mrs Bentley (uncredited)
- Gilly Grant as nurse in bath (uncredited)
- Lindsay March as shapely nurse (uncredited)
- Laura Collins as nurse (uncredited)
- Marianne Stone as Mrs Putzova (scenes deleted)

== Crew ==
- Screenplay – Talbot Rothwell
- Music – Eric Rogers
- Production manager – Jack Swinburne
- Art director – Lionel Couch
- Editor – Alfred Roome
- Director of photography – Ernest Steward
- Camera operator – James Bawden
- Continuity – Joy Mercer
- Assistant director – Bert Batt
- Sound recordists – Danny Daniel & Ken Barker
- Make-up – Geoffrey Rodway
- Hairdresser – Stella Rivers
- Costume designer – Courtenay Elliott
- Assistant art director – William Alexander
- Set dresser – Peter Lamont
- Dubbing editor – Peter Best
- Titles – GSE Ltd
- Processor – Rank Film Laboratories
- Assistant editor – Jack Gardner
- Wardrobe mistresses – Vi Murray & Maggie Lewin
- Producer – Peter Rogers
- Director – Gerald Thomas

== Filming and locations ==
- Filming dates – 11 October-26 November 1971

Interiors:

- Pinewood Studios, Buckinghamshire

Exteriors:

- Heatherwood Hospital, Ascot, Berkshire
- The White House, Denham, Buckinghamshire
- St Mary's Church, Denham, Buckinghamshire

== Reception ==
In a 2018 retrospective on the series, the British Film Institute named Carry On Matron as one of the series' five best films, alongside Carry On Cleo (1964), Carry On Screaming! (1966), Carry On Up the Khyber (1968), and Carry On Camping (1969).

== Bibliography ==
- Davidson, Andy (2012). Carry On Confidential. London: Miwk. ISBN 978-1-908630-01-8.
- Sheridan, Simon (2011). Keeping the British End Up – Four Decades of Saucy Cinema. London: Titan Books. ISBN 978-0-85768-279-6.
- Webber, Richard (2009). 50 Years of Carry On. London: Arrow. ISBN 978-0-09-949007-4.
- Hudis, Norman (2008). No Laughing Matter. London: Apex. ISBN 978-1-906358-15-0.
- Keeping the British End Up: Four Decades of Saucy Cinema by Simon Sheridan (third edition) (2007) (Reynolds & Hearn Books)
- Ross, Robert (2002). The Carry On Companion. London: Batsford. ISBN 978-0-7134-8771-8.
- Bright, Morris; Ross, Robert (2000). Mr Carry On – The Life & Work of Peter Rogers. London: BBC Books. ISBN 978-0-563-55183-6.
- Rigelsford, Adrian (1996). Carry On Laughing – a celebration. London: Virgin. ISBN 1-85227-554-5.
- Hibbin, Sally & Nina (1988). What a Carry On. London: Hamlyn. ISBN 978-0-600-55819-4.
- Eastaugh, Kenneth (1978). The Carry On Book. London: David & Charles. ISBN 978-0-7153-7403-0.
