= Carry On Loving =

1970 British comedy film by Gerald Thomas

- Cinema release poster by Renato Fratini
- Directed by: Gerald Thomas
- Written by: Talbot Rothwell
- Produced by: Peter Rogers
- Starring: Sid James; Kenneth Williams; Charles Hawtrey; Joan Sims; Hattie Jacques; Terry Scott; Richard O'Callaghan; Bernard Bresslaw; Jacki Piper; Imogen Hassall
- Cinematography: Ernest Steward
- Edited by: Alfred Roome
- Music by: Eric Rogers
- Distributed by: Rank Organisation
- Release date: September 1970
- Running time: 88 minutes
- Country: United Kingdom
- Language: English
- Budget: £215,000

Carry On Loving is a 1970 British comedy film, the 20th release in the series of 31 Carry On films (1958–1992). It was directed by Gerald Thomas and features series regulars Sid James, Kenneth Williams, Charles Hawtrey, Joan Sims, Hattie Jacques, Terry Scott and Bernard Bresslaw alongside newcomers Richard O'Callaghan (in his first Carry On) and Imogen Hassall (in her only Carry On role). The film was followed by Carry On Henry in 1971.

== Plot ==
Various events involve a dating agency run by Sid Bliss and his longtime girlfriend Sophie Plummett. Their "Wedded Bliss" agency purports to bring together lonely hearts using computer-matching technology, but couples are actually paired up by Sophie. Bliss consistently avoids marrying Sophie, enthusiastically pursuing Esme Crowfoot, a corsetiére and client who consistently rejects his advances.

Percival Snooper becomes a client to find a wife for business reasons: as a confirmed bachelor, he is inept at his job as a marriage counsellor due to lack of personal experience. James Bedsop is a private detective whom Sophie hires to spy on Sid's after-hours activities when he supposedly "vets" the female clients, including Esme.

Timid Bertram Muffet winds up with model Sally Martin after the agency muddles his directions to a blind date. Client Terry Philpott suffers several failures in his dealings with the agency including a disastrous meeting with prim, sheltered Jenny Grubb. Jenny moves in with Sally, undergoes a makeover, and becomes a model. Terry later finds romance with the "new" Jenny.

Percival's association with Sophie provokes his jealous housekeeper, dowdy Miss Dempsey, to reveal her seductive side. Esme's estranged lover, volatile wrestler Gripper Burke, returns to cause havoc over an instance of mistaken identity.

Peter Butterworth appears in a one-minute cameo as a Bluebeard-esque character jokingly referred to as Dr Crippen. He approaches Sid Bliss to find his third wife. His first wife died eating poisoned mushrooms, the second suffered a fractured skull because she "wouldn't eat the mushrooms".

== Cast ==
- Sid James as Sidney Bliss
- Kenneth Williams as Percival Snooper
- Charles Hawtrey as James Bedsop
- Hattie Jacques as Sophie Plummett
- Joan Sims as Esme Crowfoot
- Bernard Bresslaw as Gripper Burke
- Terry Scott as Terry Philpott
- Jacki Piper as Sally Martin
- Richard O'Callaghan as Bertrum Muffet
- Imogen Hassall as Jenny Grubb
- Patsy Rowlands as Miss Dempsey
- Bill Pertwee as barman
- Julian Holloway as Adrian
- Janet Mahoney as Gay
- Joan Hickson as Mrs Grubb
- Mike Grady and Valerie Shute as the lovers
- Patricia Franklin as Mrs Dreery
- Bill Maynard as Mr Dreery
- Peter Butterworth as sinister client
- Amelia Bayntun as corset lady
- Ann Way as Victoria Grubb
- Anthony Sagar as hospital patient
- Kenny Lynch as bus conductor
- Joe Cornelius as Boxing Second
- Dorothea Phillips as Aunt Beatrice Grubb

== Filming and locations ==
- Filming dates – 6 April-15 May 1970

Interiors:

- Pinewood Studios, Buckinghamshire

Exteriors:

- The streets of Windsor, Berkshire. The building at the corner of Park Street and Sheet Street doubled for the Wedded Bliss Agency. This had been used a decade earlier for the Helping Hands Agency in Carry On Regardless.

== Reception ==
=== Box office ===
It was the fourth-most-popular film at the British box office in 1971.

=== Critical ===
The Sunday Sun said it was "no worse or better than its many predecessors". "All you have to do is sit back and have a good old snigger", said the Daily Mail. The Evening Standard said "by now it's all a mite bit mechanical."

David Parkinson contributed a retrospective review for Radio Times. Awarding the film 2 out of 5 stars, Parkinson said it was a patchy entry in the series which spent too much time with the other clients of the bureau at the expense of the proprietors and the characters played by Joan Sims and Kenneth Williams.

== Bibliography ==
- Davidson, Andy (2012). Carry On Confidential. London: Miwk. ISBN 978-1-908630-01-8.
- Sheridan, Simon (2011). Keeping the British End Up – Four Decades of Saucy Cinema. London: Titan Books. ISBN 978-0-85768-279-6.
- Webber, Richard (2009). 50 Years of Carry On. London: Arrow. ISBN 978-0-09-949007-4.
- Hudis, Norman (2008). No Laughing Matter. London: Apex. ISBN 978-1-906358-15-0.
- Keeping the British End Up: Four Decades of Saucy Cinema by Simon Sheridan (third edition) (2007) (Reynolds & Hearn Books)
- Ross, Robert (2002). The Carry On Companion. London: Batsford. ISBN 978-0-7134-8771-8.
- Bright, Morris; Ross, Robert (2000). Mr Carry On – The Life & Work of Peter Rogers. London: BBC Books. ISBN 978-0-563-55183-6.
- Rigelsford, Adrian (1996). Carry On Laughing – a celebration. London: Virgin. ISBN 1-85227-554-5.
- Hibbin, Sally & Nina (1988). What a Carry On. London: Hamlyn. ISBN 978-0-600-55819-4.
- Eastaugh, Kenneth (1978). The Carry On Book. London: David & Charles. ISBN 978-0-7153-7403-0.
