= Patsy Rowlands =

British actress (1931–2005)

- Born: Patricia Amy Rowlands; 19 January 1931; Palmers Green, Middlesex, England
- Died: 22 January 2005 (aged 74); Hove, East Sussex, England
- Years active: 1959–2001
- Television: Bless This House; Hallelujah!
- Spouse: Malcolm Sircom (m. 1962; div. 1971)
- Children: 1

Patricia Amy Rowlands (19 January 1931 – 22 January 2005) was an English actress who is best remembered for her roles in the Carry On films series, as Betty Lewis in the ITV Thames sitcom Bless This House, and as Alice Meredith in the Yorkshire Television sitcom Hallelujah!.

== Early years ==
Rowlands was born on 19 January 1931 in Palmers Green, Middlesex and attended the Sacred Heart convent school at Whetstone. An elocution teacher spotted her potential and encouraged her to pursue a career in acting. She applied to the Guildhall School of Music and Drama and won a scholarship aged 15.

== Early career ==
Rowlands began her career in the chorus of Annie Get Your Gun, followed by a summer season in Torquay. She then spent several years with the Players' Theatre in London, before making her West End theatre debut in Sandy Wilson's musical Valmouth.

Rowlands's other West End credits included Semi-Detached with Laurence Olivier and directed by Tony Richardson (with whom she was to work often, appearing in his 1963 film Tom Jones), Shut Your Eyes and Think of England, with Donald Sinden, The Seagull and Ben Travers's The Bed Before Yesterday, both directed by Lindsay Anderson and When We Are Married for Ronald Eyre. She also starred in Cameron Mackintosh's revival of Oliver! in the mid-1990s, as well as playing Jack's mother in the original London cast of Sondheim's Into the Woods. Her final appearance was as Mrs Pearce in the National Theatre's production of My Fair Lady which also starred Jonathan Pryce.

Rowlands also appeared quite frequently on television early in her career. Amongst the various series in which she appeared, were several appearances in Gert and Daisy (1959) as Bonnie, as well as appearing in 2 episodes of Danger Man (as different, unrelated characters) and in The Avengers episode "Love All". Rowlands played the role of a love interest for George called "Beryl" in the 1979 Christmas special and final episode of George and Mildred

== From 1969 to 1991 ==
Rowlands made her debut in the Carry On films in Carry On Again Doctor in 1969 and soon became a regular member of the repertory company of performers, usually playing the dowdy, put-upon wife or the long-suffering secretary. Between 1969 and 1975 she appeared in nine of the films in increasingly large roles, appearing in Carry On Again Doctor, Carry On Loving, Carry On Henry, Carry On Matron, Carry On Abroad and Carry On Dick - more substantial roles include Carry On at Your Convenience, Carry On Girls and Carry On Behind.

On 7 March 1971, Rowlands starred in a single episode (You've Really Landed Me In It This Time) of the ITV sitcom Doctor at Large, with Barry Evans and George Layton, as a nymphomaniac secretary, the kind of role she had played in Carry On Loving.

From 1971 to 1976, Rowlands played Betty, the feckless neighbour in the ITV sitcom Bless This House, which starred fellow Carry On star Sid James. Her other television credits at this time included a couple of episodes of For the Love of Ada, playing a pregnant woman in the maternity ward also appearances with comedians such as Les Dawson and Dick Emery. In the early 1980s, she appeared with Thora Hird in the sitcom Hallelujah!, in which they played an aunt and niece in The Salvation Army. In 1991, she appeared in an episode of Zorro filmed in Madrid, Spain.

Rowlands also appeared in screen versions of two of Frances Hodgson Burnett's books: the television film Little Lord Fauntleroy (1980), as Mrs. Dibble, and a TV dramatisation of A Little Princess (1986) as the baker's wife.

== Later years ==
Towards the end of her life, Rowlands appeared in several revivals of major musicals such as Oliver! at the London Palladium and My Fair Lady at the Theatre Royal, Drury Lane.

Rowlands later television credits include The Cazalets, The Canterbury Tales, The Cater Street Hangman, Get Well Soon, Vanity Fair, Murder Most English, and Bottom for the BBC. In 2002, she was a guest on the paranormal series Most Haunted. Rowlands took part in several DVD audio commentaries along with other surviving stars of the Carry On films in 2003.

== Illness and death ==
Rowlands developed breast cancer, abandoned her plans to become an acting teacher and retired. She died of the disease in an East Sussex hospice, aged 74.

== Filmography ==
Year	Title	Role	Notes
1961	On the Fiddle	Evie	
1961	Over the Odds	Marilyn	
1961	In the Doghouse	Barmaid	
1962	A Kind of Loving	Dorothy	
1962	The Brain	Young Woman at Dance Hall	Uncredited
1963	Tom Jones	Honor	
1963	A Stitch in Time	Amy	
1964	Love and Maud Carver	Maud Carver	
1965	Dateline Diamonds	Mrs Edgecomb	
1969	Carry On Again Doctor	Miss Fosdick	
1970	Carry On Loving	Miss Dempsey	
1971	Carry On Henry	Ex-Queen	
1971	Please Sir!	Angela Cutforth	
1971	Carry On at Your Convenience	Hortence Withering	
1972	Carry On Matron	Miss Banks	
1972	Bless This House	Betty Lewis	
1972	Alice's Adventures in Wonderland	Cook	
1972	Carry On Abroad	Miss Dobbs	
1973	Carry On Girls	Mildred Bumble	
1974	Carry On Dick	Mrs Giles	
1975	Carry On Behind	Linda Upmore	
1977	Joseph Andrews	Gammer Andrews	
1978	Sammy's Super T-Shirt	Mum	
1979	Tess	The Landlady	
1990	Crimestrike	Madame Tepinski	
2002	The Princess and the Pea	Sasha	Voice

== Television roles ==
Year	Title	Role	Notes
1959	Gert and Daisy	Bonnie	
1960	Stuff and Nonsense	June Primble	TV movie
1961	One Way Pendulum	Sylvia Groomkirby	TV movie
1961	The Final Test	Cora	TV movie
1961-1964	Danger Man	Mrs. Harkness/Mrs. Farebrother	2 episodes
1962	The Amazing Dr Clitterhouse	Daisy	TV movie
1962	Not At All	Mrs. Chas	TV movie
1964	The Massingham Affair	Georgina Deverel	5 episodes
1965	Out of the Unknown	Anne Lovejoy	Episode: "Come Buttercup, Come Daisy, Come..."
1966	Take A Sapphire	Leopoldina	TV movie
1968-1970	Inside George Webley	Rosemary Webley	
1969	The Avengers	Thelma	Episode: "Love All"
1970	Jackanory	Narrator	Story: "Mrs. Pepperpot"
1971	Doctor at Large	Liz Hickle	Episode: "You've Really Landed Me In It This Time"
1971-1972	Tottering Towers	Miss Twitty	
1971-1976	Bless This House	Betty Lewis	
1974-1977	The Squirrels	Susan	
1975	Not on Your Nellie	Clarissa Cholmondeley-Burnside	Episode: "High Society"
1975	The Basil Brush Show	Dazzie	1 episode
1979	3-2-1	Herself	1 episode
1979	George and Mildred	Beryl, the barmaid	Episode: "The Twenty-Six Year Itch"
1980	The Nesbitts Are Coming	WPC Naylor	
1980	Little Lord Fauntleroy	Mrs. Dibble	TV movie
1981	Dangerous Davies: The Last Detective	Madame Tarantella	TV movie
1981	Kinvig	Netta Kinvig	
1981	The Incredible Mr Tanner	Martha	Episode: "The Better Hair"
1982-1986	In Loving Memory	Tiger-Lilly Longstaff	
1986	The Collectors	Caterina Zanoni	Episode 4: “The great ice-cream wars”
1989	Never the Twain	Pamela Davenport	Episode: "Neighbours"
1983-1984	Hallelujah!	Alice Meredith	
1987	When We Are Married	Lottie Grady	TV movie
1987-1992	Rainbow	Auntie	5 episodes
1992	Bottom	Lil Potato	Episode: "Parade"
1992	In Dreams	Royalist Housewife	TV movie
1997	Get Well Soon	Mrs Clapton	4 episodes
1998	The Cater Street Hangman	Mrs. Dumphy	TV movie
2001	The Cazalets	The Governess	Miniseries
