= Talbot Rothwell =

British screenwriter (1916–1981)

Talbot Nelson Conn "Tolly" Rothwell, OBE (12 November 1916 – 28 February 1981) was an English screenwriter.

== Life and career ==
Rothwell was born in Bromley, Kent, England. He had a variety of jobs during his early life: town clerk, police officer and Royal Air Force pilot.

Rothwell was made a prisoner of war during World War II after being shot down over Norway. It was during this period, while incarcerated in Stalag Luft III, that he started to write. Peter Butterworth was in the same camp and the two became firm friends, working on camp concerts with Rothwell mostly writing and Butterworth performing. These concerts helped to relieve the boredom of camp life and the noise helped cover tunnelling escape efforts.

After World War II, Rothwell took up writing as his profession, writing scripts for the Crazy Gang, Arthur Askey, Ted Ray and Terry-Thomas. His hit play Queen Elizabeth Slept Here ran for 349 performances at the Strand Theatre in London's West End.

=== Carry On films ===
By the time he submitted a screenplay to Carry On films producer Peter Rogers, he was already an established screenwriter. The first screenplay he submitted, on spec, to series producer Peter Rogers, was Carry On Jack, although the first of Rothwell's screenplays to be filmed was Call Me a Cab. It went on to be renamed Carry On Cabby.

Peter Rogers liked Rothwell's writing so much that he asked him to become the Carry On staff writer; Rothwell went on to write a further nineteen Carry On films. He took the series into a more lewd and bawdy direction from that of Carry On's first screenwriter, Norman Hudis, but was careful never to stray into pornographic territory. He saw the films as a continuation of music hall entertainment, Max Miller being a hero of his.

Rothwell also wrote several Carry On TV specials for Christmas, and co-wrote Up Pompeii! starring Frankie Howerd.

Rothwell was awarded the OBE in 1977 for his services to the cinema industry.

== Illness and death ==
Rothwell retired from screenwriting in the mid-1970s due to ill health. Accounts of this period describe a prolonged decline in his health but do not name a specific medical condition. He spent his final years living quietly in Worthing, Sussex, and died there on 28 February 1981, aged 64, after a long illness.

== Filmography ==
- Is Your Honeymoon Really Necessary? (1953)
- Don't Blame the Stork (1954), co-writers Victor Katona and Wolfgang Wilhelm
- What Every Woman Wants (1954)
- The Crowded Day (1954)
- My Wife's Family (1956), co-writer Gilbert Gunn
- Stars in Your Eyes (1956), co-writer Hubert Gregg
- Make Mine a Million (1959), co-writers Arthur Askey, Peter Blackmore, Jack Francis
- Friends and Neighbours (1959), co-writer Val Valentine
- Carry On Cabby (1963)
- Carry On Spying (1964)
- Carry On Cleo (1964)
- Carry On Jack (1964)
- The Big Job (1965), co-writer John Antrobus
- Carry on Cowboy (1965)
- Three Hats for Lisa (1965), co-writer Leslie Bricusse
- Carry On... Follow That Camel (1967)
- Carry On Don't Lose Your Head (1967)
- Carry On Screaming! (1966)
- Carry On Doctor (1967)
- Carry On Up The Khyber (1968)
- Carry On Again Doctor (1969)
- Carry On Camping (1969)
- Carry On Loving (1970)
- Carry On Abroad (1972)
- Carry On Matron (1972)
- Carry On Girls (1973)
- Carry On Dick (1974)

== Legacy ==
In April 2007, Rothwell's line "Infamy! Infamy! They've all got it in for me!" (delivered by Kenneth Williams as Julius Caesar in Carry On Cleo) was voted the greatest one-liner in movie history by a thousand comedy writers, actors, impresarios and members of the public for the launch of the Sky Movies Comedy Channel. Rothwell "borrowed" the line (with permission) from Frank Muir and Denis Norden, who had used it on their radio show Take It From Here.

Preceded by Norman Hudis	Carry On films scriptwriter 1963 - 1974	Succeeded by Dave Freeman
