= Carry On (franchise) =

Sequence of 31 British comedy films

- Directed by: Gerald Thomas
- Written by: Norman Hudis (1958–1962); Talbot Rothwell (1963–1974)
- Produced by: Peter Rogers
- Starring: Kenneth Williams; Joan Sims; Charles Hawtrey; Sid James; Kenneth Connor; Peter Butterworth; Hattie Jacques; Bernard Bresslaw; Jim Dale; Barbara Windsor; Patsy Rowlands; Jack Douglas; Terry Scott; et al...
- Music by: Bruce Montgomery (1958–1962); Eric Rogers (1963–1975, 1977–1978); Max Harris (1976)
- Distributed by: Anglo-Amalgamated (1958–1966); The Rank Organisation (1966–1978); United International Pictures (1992)
- Country: United Kingdom
- Language: English

Carry On is a British comedy franchise comprising 31 films, the success of which led to several spin-offs, including four Christmas television specials (1969–1973), a 1975 television series of 13 episodes, a West End stage show and two provincial summer shows, produced between 1958 and 1992. Produced by Peter Rogers, the Carry On films were directed by Gerald Thomas and starred a regular ensemble that included Sid James, Kenneth Williams, Charles Hawtrey, Joan Sims, Kenneth Connor, Peter Butterworth, Hattie Jacques, Terry Scott, Bernard Bresslaw, Barbara Windsor, Patsy Rowlands, Jack Douglas, and Jim Dale. The humour of Carry On was in the British comic tradition of music hall and bawdy seaside postcards.

The Carry On series contains the largest number of films of any British film franchise, and is the second longest running, albeit with a 14-year gap (1978–1992) between the 30th and 31st entries.

Rogers and Thomas were responsible for all 31 films, usually on time and to a strict budget, and often employed the same crew—some of whom were also regulars on the James Bond series, such as Peter Lamont, Alan Hume, and Anthony Waye. Between 1958 and 1992, the series employed seven writers, most often Norman Hudis (1958–1962) and Talbot Rothwell (1963–1974). Anglo Amalgamated Film Distributors Ltd produced 12 films (1958–1966), and the Rank Organisation made 18 (1966–1978), while United International Pictures produced one (1992).

All films were made at Pinewood Studios near Iver Heath, Buckinghamshire. Budgetary constraints meant that a large proportion of the location filming was undertaken close to the studios in and around south Buckinghamshire, including areas of Berkshire and Middlesex. However, by the late 1960s, at the height of the series' success, more ambitious plots occasionally necessitated locations further afield, which included Snowdonia National Park, Wales (with the foot of Snowdon standing in for the Khyber Pass in Carry On Up the Khyber), and the beaches of the Sussex coast doubling as Saharan sand dunes in Follow That Camel.

== Background ==
Carry On Sergeant (1958) is about a group of recruits doing National Service; its title, a command commonly issued by army officers to their sergeants in the course of their routine duties, was in keeping with its setting. The film was sufficiently successful to inspire a similar venture, again focusing on an established and respected profession in Carry On Nurse. When that too was successful, further forays with Carry On Teacher and Carry On Constable established the series. This initial 'pattern' was broken with the fifth film in 1961, Carry On Regardless, but it still followed a similar plot to that of many of the early films—a small group of misfit newcomers to a job make comic mistakes, but come together to succeed in the end.

The remainder of the series developed with increased use of the British comic traditions of music hall and bawdy seaside postcards. Many titles parodied more serious films, such as their tongue-in-cheek homages to James Bond films (Spying), Westerns (Cowboy), and Hammer horror films (Screaming!). The most impressive of these was Carry On Cleo (1964), in which the budget-conscious production team made full use of some impressive sets that had been created in 1960 for the Burton and Taylor epic Cleopatra (1963) but abandoned when production moved to Rome. Carry On Emmannuelle (1978), inspired by the soft-porn Emmanuelle, brought to an end the original Carry On run.

The stock-in-trade of Carry On humour was innuendo and sending-up British institutions that the target audience would have personally experienced or been knowledgeable of, such as the National Health Service (Nurse, Doctor, Again Doctor, Matron), British history (Jack, Up the Khyber, Henry, England), and holidays (Cruising, Camping, Abroad, Behind), amongst others. Although the films were very often panned by critics, they mostly proved very popular with audiences. In 2007, the pun "Infamy, infamy, they've all got it in for me", spoken by Kenneth Williams (playing Julius Caesar) in Carry on Cleo, was voted the funniest one-line joke in film history. However, this line had originally been written by Frank Muir and Denis Norden for Jimmy Edwards in the radio series Take It From Here some years previously.

A film had appeared in 1957 under the title Carry On Admiral; although this was a comedy in similar vein (and even featured Joan Sims in the cast) it has no connection to the Carry On series itself. The much earlier 1937 film Carry On London is also unrelated (though it coincidentally starred future Carry On performer Eric Barker).

The cast were poorly paid—usually £5,000 per film for the principal male performers (Kenneth Williams and Sid James), female leads earned less, between £2,000 to £3,000. Williams lamented this in his diaries and criticised several of the films, despite his declared fondness for the series as a whole. Series producer Rogers acknowledged: "Kenneth was worth taking care of, because while he cost very little [...] he made a very great deal of money for the franchise." Phil Silvers was cast in Follow That Camel, partly to raise the franchise profile in the US, and was paid £40,000 – far in excess of any of the regular actors.

== Cast ==
The Carry On series includes a broad cast across the films and other adaptations. The regular core ensemble cast was made up of Sid James, Kenneth Williams, Charles Hawtrey, Joan Sims, Kenneth Connor, Peter Butterworth, Hattie Jacques, Bernard Bresslaw, Barbara Windsor, Jim Dale, Patsy Rowlands, Jack Douglas and Terry Scott.

== Filmography ==
- Carry On Sergeant (1958)
- Carry On Nurse (1959)
- Carry On Teacher (1959)
- Carry On Constable (1960)
- Carry On Regardless (1961)
- Carry On Cruising (1962)
- Carry On Cabby (1963)
- Carry On Jack (1964)
- Carry On Spying (1964)
- Carry On Cleo (1964)
- Carry On Cowboy (1965)
- Carry On Screaming! (1966)
- Don't Lose Your Head (1967)
- Follow That Camel (1967)
- Carry On Doctor (1967)
- Carry On Up the Khyber (1968)
- Carry On Camping (1969)
- Carry On Again Doctor (1969)
- Carry On Up the Jungle (1970)
- Carry On Loving (1970)
- Carry On Henry (1971)
- Carry On at Your Convenience (1971)
- Carry On Matron (1972)
- Carry On Abroad (1972)
- Carry On Girls (1973)
- Carry On Dick (1974)
- Carry On Behind (1975)
- Carry On England (1976)
- That's Carry On! (1977)
- Carry On Emmannuelle (1978)
- Carry On Columbus (1992)

=== Planned films ===
Several other films were planned, scripted (or partly scripted) or entered pre-production before being abandoned:

- Carry On Vicar (1959), an idea discussed by Norman Hudis and Stuart Levy after the release of Carry On Teacher. It was abandoned after they realised that they, Levy's partner Nat Cohen and director Gerald Thomas were all of Jewish heritage, and the film would "add up to four Jews poking fun at the Church of England".
- Carry On Smoking (1961), revolving around a fire station and various attempts to train a bungling group of new recruits.
- Carry On Spaceman (1961), scripted by Norman Hudis and planned to be released shortly after Carry On Regardless. Satirising the Space Race, the cast was to consist of three would-be astronauts who constantly bungled on their training and their mission into outer space; most likely the trio would have been played by Kenneth Williams, Kenneth Connor, and Leslie Phillips that had been established in Carry On Constable. Attempts to revive Carry On Spaceman in 1962 under Denis Gifford, again by Hudis, failed, and the project was subsequently abandoned.
- Carry On Flying (1962), about a group of RAF recruits. Norman Hudis penned a script and the film got as far as pre-production before being abandoned. Jim Dale was to have had a starring role.
- Carry On Robin (1965), a spoof on Robin Hood and starring "the Carry On regulars", with either Dale and Sid James in the titular role. Rogers outlined the film and registered it with the British Film Producers Association but never pursued it any further.
- Carry On Charlie (1970), a historical picture based on the tales surrounding Bonnie Prince Charlie during the Scottish uprisings. Rogers registered the name at the same time as Carry On Henry but it was ultimately unmade.
- Carry On With the Wind (1973), a spoof on the 1939 historical epic Gone With the Wind. Rogers discussed the upcoming film in a Radio Times article in which it was described as the twenty-fifth Carry On, but the idea was abandoned and the twenty-fifth film became Carry On Girls.
- Carry On Escaping (1973), a spoof of World War II escape films. Talbot Rothwell's complete script is included in the book The Complete A–Z of Everything Carry On.
- Carry On Texas (1982), a parody of popular American soap opera Dallas, was suggested as early as 1980. A script was written by Vince Powell and casting offers made to Williams, Connor, Dale, Charles Hawtrey, Jack Douglas, Joan Sims and Barbara Windsor. The production was abandoned when Dallas production company Lorimar Productions demanded a royalty fee of 20 times the total production budget. The idea was revisited in 1987, with casting considerations for Windsor, Douglas, Bernard Bresslaw, Terry Scott and Anita Harris, but the idea progressed no further.
- Carry On Down Under (1987) was considered following the success of Neighbours in the United Kingdom and the popularity of the Carry On series in Australia. Financing was secured by an eager businessman and Gerald Thomas spoke to the Australian Film Commission about potentially shooting there, while Vince Powell began writing a script. However, the finance offer fell through and the project was abandoned; Powell's incomplete script is included in Fifty Years of Carry On.
- Carry On Buddha (1992) was unofficially touted to start production after Carry On Columbus, but pushed back in favour of another reboot of Carry On Again Nurse. The failure of Columbus saw the project shelved.

Other films of undetermined dates, all of which never progressed further than initial discussion or planning, include What a Carry On..., Carry On Fleet Street and Carry On Yank.

==== Carry On Again Nurse ====
An intended sub-sequel to the successful Carry On Nurse was renamed and made as Carry On Doctor in 1967. Carry On Nurse was alluded to twice in Carry On Doctor, firstly with the sub-titles (one reading Nurse Carries On Again and Death of a Daffodil), and again in a later scene with Frankie Howerd commenting on a vase of daffodils in his hospital room. A second attempt at Carry On Again Nurse came in 1979, after the series left Rank Films and moved to Hemdale. A completed script had been written by George Layton and Jonathan Lynn in 1977, and parts were offered to Williams, Windsor, Hawtrey and Hattie Jacques (reprising her role as hospital matron). The attempt was cancelled due to the financial loss of Carry On Emmannuelle.

The final attempt to create Carry On Again Nurse came in 1988, with a script written by Norman Hudis. It was to revolve around a hospital set for closure, and set to star Windsor, Williams, Hawtrey, Douglas, Connor and Sims, with Sims reprising her role from Carry On Nurse to fill the role of matron. The end of the film was going to be a tribute to Hattie Jacques, with Sims turning around a photograph of the actress and asking "Well, did I do alright?". Production was scheduled to begin in June 1988, but the death of Williams in April followed by that of Hawtrey in October – combined with a budget of £1.5 million, which was deemed too expensive – proved to be the end of the film and it was cancelled. The complete script is included in The Lost Carry Ons.

When Carry On Columbus was announced, speculation was given to another attempt at Carry On Again Nurse and Hudis's script was revisited. The discussion ended with the failure of Columbus.

==== Carry On London ====
The final proposed Carry On, before Peter Rogers's death in 2009, was Carry On London. Announced in 2003 by Rogers and producer James Black, it remained in pre-production well into 2008. The script was signed off by the production company in late March 2008, and "centred on a limousine company ferrying celebrities to an awards show". The film had several false starts, with the producers and cast changing extensively over time. Welsh actress Jynine James was the only consistent name from 2003 to 2008. Danniella Westbrook, David Jason, Shaun Williamson and Burt Reynolds were also once attached to the project. It was announced in May 2006 that Vinnie Jones and Shane Richie were to star in the film, which was to be directed by Peter Richardson, though Ed Bye later replaced him as the named director. At the 50th anniversary party held at Pinewood Studios in March 2008, Rogers confirmed that he was planning a series of Carry On films after London, subject to the success of the first.

In early 2009, Carry On London or Carry On Bananas was once again 'back on', with Charlie Higson attached as director, and a different, more modern, cast list involving Frank Skinner, Paul O'Grady, Jennifer Ellison and Liza Tarbuck (who would respectively parallel Sid James, Kenneth Williams, Barbara Windsor and Hattie Jacques), with Jynine James, Lenny Henry, Justin Lee Collins, Meera Syal and James Dreyfus. Despite new media interest and sets being constructed at Pinewood Studios, the film was once again put on hold, and the project was abandoned after the death of Peter Rogers in April 2009.

=== Reboot ===
In May 2016, producer Jonathan Sothcott of Hereford Films announced plans for a new series of Carry On films, beginning with Carry On Doctors and Carry On Campus. On 12 April 2017, Sothcott confirmed to the website The Hollywood News that he was no longer involved with the film series. As of September 2019, three Carry On films were set to be filmed back-to-back, after Brian Baker won the rights to the movies following a legal battle with ITV earlier that year. Production of the new films had been planned to take place in spring 2020. However, filming was postponed due to the COVID-19 pandemic and little more was heard about the project until after the death of Barbara Windsor in December 2020, when Baker announced that he would be using old footage of the actress in the film, saying "Barbara will be making an appearance." Baker told the Daily Star Sunday that "we have got two new stories and we are looking to do one of the old ones again to bring it up to modern day quality – probably Carry On Sergeant".

Baker's company Carry On Films Ltd was later dissolved.

=== Associated films ===
During the original run there were several other films made at Pinewood Studios that featured the regular cast and crew of the Carry On films in similar comedic circumstances, especially as the popularity of the series increased. These include Please Turn Over (1959), Watch Your Stern (1960), Raising the Wind (1961) and The Big Job (1965), all of were produced by Rogers, directed by Gerald Thomas and feature at least two of the regular Carry On cast. Despite the similarities, these are considered separate productions unattached to the series.

== Spin-offs ==
=== Television ===
The characters and comedy style of the Carry On film series were adapted to a television series titled Carry On Laughing, and several Christmas specials.

=== Album ===
In 1971, Music for Pleasure released a long-playing record, Oh! What a Carry On! (MFP MONO 1416), featuring songs performed by Kenneth Williams, Jim Dale, Kenneth Connor, Frankie Howerd, Bernard Bresslaw, Joan Sims, Barbara Windsor, and Dora Bryan.

== Legacy ==
=== Documentaries ===
A 50-minute television documentary, What's a Carry On?, was made in 1998 for the 40th anniversary of the first film. It included archive clips, out-takes and interviews with surviving cast members. It was included as an extra on the DVD release of Carry On Emmannuelle.

A two-hour radio documentary, Carry On Forever!, presented by Leslie Phillips, was broadcast in two parts on BBC Radio 2 on 19 and 20 July 2010. A three-part television retrospective with the same title, narrated by Martin Clunes, was shown on ITV3 in the UK over Easter 2015.

=== Home media ===
The Carry On film series has had numerous individual releases on VHS, and a number of VHSs were released in an eighteen VHS box-set on 1 September 2003.

The film series was first released as a DVD box-set on 1 September 2008, by ITV Studios Home Entertainment. Five years later, on 7 October 2013, it was re-released with smaller packaging. All the movies contained in the collection are also available to buy individually.

Since 2013, StudioCanal has released a number of the Carry On films on Blu-ray, beginning with Carry On Screaming! (21 October 2013), Carry On Cleo (5 May 2014), Carry On Cowboy (2 June 2014) and Carry On Jack (7 July 2014).

=== Cultural influence ===
The success of the Carry On series occasionally led to affectionate parodies of the series by other contemporary comedians:

- Clips from several Carry On films are used in In The Movies It Doesn't Hurt (1975), a short film on laboratory safety for schools fronted by Bernard Bresslaw.
- In The Goodies' book The Making of the Goodies Disaster Movie (1977), the trio visit the set of Carry On Christ in order to get advice from the Carry On team, while they are filming a scene relating to 'The Feeding of the Five Thousand', with the cast noted as Kenneth Williams and Kenneth Connor as disciples, Joan Sims as "Judith Iscarriat", Charles Hawtrey as "A Wise Virgin", Barbara Windsor as "Not a Wise Virgin" and Hattie Jacques as "The Five Thousand". Orson Welles is also listed as playing God in a voiceover role.
- A "flash frame" of the end shot of Carry On Cowboy is used in series two of The Young Ones.
- In The Spitting Image Book, released in 1985, there is a reference to a fictitious made-for-TV film entitled Carry On Up the Rectum, satirising the transparency of the puns used for Carry On Up the Khyber and possibly Carry On Up the Jungle.
- In the 1986 song Some Girls Are Bigger Than Others by The Smiths, one of the lines is "As Anthony said to Cleopatra, as he opened a crate of ale, oh, I say", making reference to Carry On Cleo.
- Harry Enfield's mockumentary Norbert Smith: A Life (1989) includes a clip from an imagined film, Carry On Banging (a parody of the more risque approach of the later films, such as Carry On Dick and Carry On Emmannuelle). The setting is the Greenham Common Women's Peace Camp of the 1980s, and featured Barbara Windsor, Kenneth Connor and Jack Douglas.
- The satirical website TVGoHome often included Carry On films in its fictional listings.
- That Mitchell and Webb Look features the sketch "Bawdy 1970s Hospital", which portrays a stereotypical Carry On-style hospital with frequent use of double entendre, except by one doctor who has trouble fitting in as he comes out with simple obscenity, unable to understand the distinction.
- In Tom Holt's eighth Portable Door novel When It's a Jar (2013) the Carrion franchise offers a "uniquely quirky blend of spatterfest zombie horror and traditional British slapstick-and-innuendo comedy" with titles such as Carrion Nursing, Carrion Camping and Carrion Up the Khyber.
- In the 2023 television series Funny Woman, the Carry On films are mentioned several times as character Sophie Straw (Gemma Arterton) receives an offer for a role in a proposed entry in the series.

Carry On films Cost and Box Office Comparisons with verifiable UK box-office receipts (inflation-adjusted to 2025)
Film	Year	Production budget (original £)	Production budget (£2025 )	UK gross (original £)	UK gross (£2025 )	Sources
Carry On Sergeant	1958	£73,000	~£1,830,000	£500,000	~£12,550,000	Budget and UK gross reported in independent film data compilations. Inflation calculated using UK CPI (≈25.1× 1958–2025).
Carry On Columbus	1992	£2,500,000	~£6,610,000	£1,600,000 (UK total gross)	~£4,230,000	UK box-office receipts reported in box-office tracking sources. Inflation calculated using UK CPI (≈2.64× 1992–2025).
