= Gerald Thomas =

British film director, editor and producer (1920–1993)

- Born: 10 December 1920; Hull, East Riding of Yorkshire, England
- Died: 9 November 1993 (aged 72); Beaconsfield, Buckinghamshire, England
- Occupations: Film director and editor
- Years active: 1956–1993
- Spouse: Barbara Thomas
- Children: 3
- Relatives: Ralph Thomas (brother); Jeremy Thomas (nephew)

Gerald Thomas (10 December 1920 – 9 November 1993) was an English film director best known for the long-running Carry On series of British film comedies.

== Early life ==
Born in Hull, East Riding of Yorkshire, England, Thomas was educated in Bristol and London, and was training in medicine when World War II began. He served four years in the British Army during the war, and upon his return to civilian life thought it too late to continue his medical studies.

== Career ==
Thomas began his film career at Denham Studios, eventually becoming an assistant film editor beginning with Laurence Olivier's Hamlet (1948). His editing work included many films directed by his older brother, Ralph Thomas. His directorial debut was the short film Circus Friends (1956), produced by the Children's Film Foundation. His first feature was the thriller Time Lock the following year.

Beginning with the farcical military comedy Carry On Sergeant (1958), Thomas directed all 30 films in the Carry On series of British comedies, produced by Peter Rogers, ending with Carry On Emmannuelle (1978) and the belated Carry On Columbus (1992). Additionally, he directed the framing sequences of the compilation film That's Carry On! (1977). Other works as a director include the comedy Please Turn Over (1959) and a drama of post-war Austria, The Second Victory (1986).

== Personal life ==
Thomas was married, and the couple had three daughters. He died at home of a heart attack. Thomas's nephew is the film producer Jeremy Thomas. He is commemorated with a green plaque on The Avenues, Kingston upon Hull.

== Films directed ==
- Circus Friends (1956)
- Time Lock (1957)
- The Vicious Circle (1957)
- The Duke Wore Jeans (1958)
- Carry On Sergeant (1958)
- Chain of Events (1958)
- The Solitary Child (1958)
- Please Turn Over (1959)
- Carry On Nurse (1959)
- Carry On Teacher (1959)
- Watch Your Stern (1960)
- No Kidding (1960)
- Carry On Constable (1960)
- Carry On Regardless (1961)
- Raising the Wind (1961)
- Twice Round the Daffodils (1962)
- Carry On Cruising (1962)
- The Iron Maiden (1963)
- Nurse on Wheels (1963)
- Carry On Cabby (1963)
- Carry On Jack (1963)
- Carry On Spying (1964)
- Carry On Cleo (1964)
- The Big Job (1965)
- Carry On Cowboy (1965)
- Carry On Screaming (1966)
- Don't Lose Your Head (1966)
- Follow That Camel (1967)
- Carry On Doctor (1967)
- Carry On... Up the Khyber (1968)
- Carry On Camping (1969)
- Carry On Again Doctor (1969)
- Carry On Up the Jungle (1970)
- Carry On Loving (1970)
- Carry On Henry (1971)
- Carry On at Your Convenience (1971)
- Bless This House (1972)
- Carry On Matron (1972)
- Carry On Abroad (1972)
- Carry On Girls (1973)
- Carry On Dick (1974)
- Carry On Behind (1975)
- Carry On England (1976)
- Carry On Emmannuelle (1978)
- The Second Victory (1987)
- Carry On Columbus (1992)
