= Peter Rogers =

English film producer (1914–2009)

- Born: 20 February 1914; Rochester, Kent, England
- Died: 14 April 2009 (aged 95); Buckinghamshire, England
- Spouse: Betty Box (m. 1948; died 1999)

Peter Rogers (20 February 1914 – 14 April 2009) was an English film producer. He is best known for creating the Carry On series of films.

== Life and career ==
Rogers began his career as a journalist for his local paper, before graduating to scriptwriting religious informational films. He progressed to film production, working with director Gerald Thomas, the first work being a production for the Children's Film Foundation. Rogers is best known as producer of the Carry On series of British comedy films, beginning with Carry On Sergeant in 1958. There were 31 films in all. Rogers had also been linked with a further instalment, Carry On London, which has been in pre-production for several years, but since his death seems unlikely to be made.

The majority of Rogers' work, including all the Carry On films, were made at Pinewood Studios in Iver Heath, Buckinghamshire, England. His other credits included Appointment with Venus starring David Niven, and Time Lock in which Sean Connery made one of his earliest film appearances.

Rogers' other production ventures include the television series Ivanhoe with Roger Moore and the film adaptation of the long-running sitcom Bless This House with Carry On regular Sid James.

His wife was the film producer Betty Box, responsible for the Doctor series of films. Peter and Betty lived for many years at a large home in Beaconsfield, "Drummers Yard", that had been purchased from the actor Dirk Bogarde. He was godfather to Donald Sinden's youngest son Marc Sinden.

Peter Rogers was described as "perfect for Anglo-Amalgamated, with his strong work ethic and desire to keep costs down" and was "the Golden Goose" for that studio, making a number of other comedies outside the Carry On series, plus one serious drama This Is My Street. However Nat Cohen fired him from Anglo in 1966, forcing Rogers to move over to Rank.

An authorised biography, Mr Carry On: The Life and Work of Peter Rogers (BBC) by Morris Bright and Robert Ross (author of The Carry On Companion and the Monty Python Encyclopaedia) was published in 2000, with extensive input from Rogers. It attempted to defend him against charges that he exploited the cast of the Carry On films, by paying the lead actors an unchanged £5,000 per film, from the first in 1958 to the penultimate movie in 1978.

In 1971-72 Rogers produced four non-Carry On dramas for Rank but none of them was particularly successful.

After Carry On Emmanuelle Rogers attempted to raise finance for further movies in the series, Carry On Again Nurse and Carry On Dallas but was unsuccessful.

Rogers attended the 50th anniversary of the Carry On films held at Pinewood Studios in March 2008. He died on 14 April 2009, having been ill for several months.
