= List of Carry On films cast members =

This is a list of actors who have appeared in Carry On films.

== Regular cast ==
The following actors are considered to be the core members of the Carry On team: Surviving cast members' names are in bold

- Kenneth Williams (1926–1988) (26 films, including co-presenting That's Carry On!) played a range of character types, nearly always a lead character. Early roles were rather strait-laced; he then sometimes played his snide character: quite slimy and smarmy with a distinctive nasal voice. Later the haughty, proud and easily outraged elitist became more frequent and Williams' best known character type. Williams sometimes played characters of other nationalities, such as in Up the Khyber. In some roles, when not actually playing his role in snide mode, Williams might deliver a single joke using his snide voice. A running gag in many of the films was that Williams' character would be embroiled in an extra-marital affair with that of Hattie Jacques—this plot device was used to greatest effect in the hospital-based films, which gave rise to Williams' famous catchphrase "ohhh Matron!".
- Joan Sims (1930–2001) (24) first appeared in Carry On Nurse. She had the longest uninterrupted run of roles in Carry On films, being in all 20 films (excluding That's Carry On) from Carry On Cleo to Carry On Emmannuelle. She played a range of characters from jolly and assertive women with sturdy moral standards (Camping, Girls) to sexy and lusty women – either desired (Constable, Cowboy) or coarse and unattractive (Henry, Up the Khyber), to a chatty glutton (Matron), battleaxe wives (Screaming, Abroad) and an unattractive spinster (Doctor). She also appeared in two of the four Carry On Christmas TV specials, and eleven episodes of the Carry On Laughing television series.
- Charles Hawtrey (1914–1988) (23) often played a meek, rather effete 'mummy's boy' who could suddenly erupt into riotous behaviour. Other roles were as a strict, officious and prissy person in an authority role. Hawtrey's characters were often bumbling and accident prone, and the victim of various mishaps and complex misunderstandings. He also appeared in two of the four Carry On Christmas TV specials.
- Sid James (1913–1976) (19) always played a lead character, usually a laconic member of the working class. His characters were often lecherous womanisers, something that caused problems in James' private life. He also appeared in three of the four Carry On Christmas television specials, and four episodes of the Carry On Laughing television series.
- Kenneth Connor (1918–1993) (17) often played put-upon men ranging in character from pompous to meek, and often leering. He also provided some additional voice-work in Emmannuelle when he dubbed the dialogue of Howard Nelson (Harry Hernia). He also appeared in three of the four Carry On Christmas television specials, and twelve episodes of the Carry On Laughing TV series.
- Peter Butterworth (1915–1979) (16) frequently played major roles in the films, often as a generally benign, unflappable but bumbling assistant or servant able to see the chaos around him. Unusually for a regular, in some films, including Again Doctor, Henry and Loving, his role consists of a cameo appearance in a single scene. He also appeared in three of the four Carry On Christmas TV specials, and nine episodes of the Carry On Laughing TV series.
- Hattie Jacques (1922–1980) (14) played the haughty matron, school senior mistress or other archetypal authority figure in several films. Later she branched out into more varied comic roles (e.g. At Your Convenience, Loving and Abroad, in which she played a chef embroiled in a constant battle with the stove). She also appeared in two of the four Carry On Christmas TV specials, and one episode of the Carry On Laughing TV series.
- Bernard Bresslaw (1934–1993) (14) varied between playing the clumsy dimwit or the heavy, or the lusty and bombastic "foreigner". In the later films his characterisation developed greater depth, such as in Dick, Behind. He also appeared in three of the four Carry On Christmas TV specials, and five episodes of the Carry On Laughing TV series.
- **Jim Dale** (born 1935) (11) joined the series with support roles, but quickly progressed to playing the younger, sympathetic male lead, often in the film's romance plot strand. From his debut had an uninterrupted nine-film run. After a two-film absence (Camping and Up The Khyber) returned for Again Doctor, his final Carry On until taking the lead role in the 1992 revival film Carry On Columbus.
- Barbara Windsor (1937–2020) (10, including co-presenting That's Carry On with Williams) played main roles in all her Carry On appearances. Her characters were always the cheeky and saucy young blonde, often in revealing costumes. Sometimes her characters were chaste (and very often chased - usually by Sid James' character), some were easily swayed. She also appeared in all four of the Carry On Christmas TV specials, and eight episodes of the Carry On Laughing TV series.
- Patsy Rowlands (1931–2005) (9) started in support roles, often as undervalued, meek and mousey secretary or assistant who undergoes transformation into a more assertive and sexually aware woman. She also appeared in one episode of the Carry On Laughing TV series.
- Jack Douglas (1927–2008) (8) joined the series with a cameo appearance in Matron, where he appears in one scene with a single line of dialogue. After an only slightly larger role in the following film Abroad, where he again plays his established Alf Ippititimus-type character, his roles increased in size and increasingly diverged from the familiar Alf performance. After his début Douglas appeared in all subsequent films in the original series, and was one of the few returners for Columbus. He also appeared in two of the four Carry On Christmas TV specials, and twelve episodes of the Carry On Laughing TV series.
- Terry Scott (1927–1994) (7) appeared briefly in the first film Sergeant and returned 10 years later when he played, among others, the put-upon husband (Camping), the barking sergeant (Up the Khyber) and lusty doctor (Matron). Additionally, he appeared in two of the four Carry On Christmas TV specials. He also filmed scenes for At Your Convenience and Abroad, which were not used in the finished films.

=== Regular cast roles ===
Title	Year	Actor												
Title	Year	Kenneth Williams	Joan Sims	Charles Hawtrey	Sid James	Kenneth Connor	Peter Butterworth	Hattie Jacques	Bernard Bresslaw	Jim Dale	Barbara Windsor	Patsy Rowlands	Jack Douglas	Terry Scott
Sergeant	1958	James Bailey	-	Peter Golightly	-	Horace Strong	-	Capt. Clark (medical officer)	-	-	-	-	-	Sgt. Paddy O'Brien
Nurse	1959	Oliver Reckitt	Student Nurse Stella Dawson	Humphrey Hinton	-	Bernie Bishop	-	Matron	Ted York's feet (uncredited)	-	-	-	-	-
Teacher	1959	Edwin Milton	Sarah Allcock	Michael Bean	-	Gregory Adams	-	Grace Short	-	-	-	-	-	-
Constable	1960	Const. Stanley Benson	WPC Gloria Passworthy	Special Const. Timothy Gorse	Sgt. Frank Wilkins	Const. Charlie Constable	-	Sgt. Laura Moon	-	-	-	-	-	-
Regardless	1961	Francis Courtenay	Lily Duveen	Gabriel Dimple	Bert Handy	Sam Twist	-	Frosty-faced Sister	-	-	-	-	-	-
Cruising	1962	Leonard Marjoribanks	-	-	Capt. Wellington Crowther	Dr. Arthur Binn	-	-	-	-	-	-	-	-
Cabby	1963	-	-	"Pint-Pot" (Terry Tankard)	Charlie Hawkins	Ted Watson	-	Peggy Hawkins	-	Expectant Father	-	-	-	-
Jack	1963	Captain Fearless	-	Walter	-	-	-	-	-	"Carrier"	-	-	-	-
Spying	1964	Desmond Simpkins	-	Charlie Bind	-	-	-	-	-	Carstairs	Daphne Honeybutt	-	-	-
Cleo	1964	Julius Caesar	Calpurnia	Seneca	Mark Antony	Hengist Pod	-	-	-	Horsa	-	-	-	-
Cowboy	1965	Judge Burke	Belle Armitage	Big Heap	Johnny Finger / The Rumpo Kid	-	Doc	-	Little Heap	Marshall P. Knutt	-	-	-	-
Screaming!	1966	Dr. Orlando Watt	Emily Bung	Dan Dann	-	-	Const. Slobotham	-	Sockett	Albert Potter	-	-	-	-
Don't Lose Your Head	1967	Citizen Camembert	Desiree Dubarry	Duc de Pommfrit	Sir Rodney Ffing / The Black Fingernail	-	Citizen Bidet	-	-	Lord Darcy Pue	-	-	-	-
Follow That Camel	1967	Cmdnt. Burger	Zig-Zig	Capt. Le Pice	-	-	Simpson	-	Sheikh Abdul Abulbul	Bertram Oliphant "Bo" West	-	-	-	-
Doctor	1967	Dr. Kenneth Tinkle	Chloe Gibson	Mr. Barron	Charlie Roper	-	Mr. Smith	Lavinia, the Matron	Ken Biddle	Dr. Jim Kilmore	Nurse Sandra May	-	-	-
Up the Khyber	1968	Randy Lal, the Khasi of Kalabar	Lady Joan Ruff-Diamond	Pte. James Widdle	Sir Sidney Ruff-Diamond	-	Brother Belcher	-	Bungdit Din	-	-	-	-	Sgt.-Maj. Macnutt
Camping	1969	Dr. Kenneth Soaper	Joan Fussey	Charlie Muggins	Sid Boggle	-	Joshua Fiddler	Miss Haggard, the Matron	Bernie Lugg	-	Babs	-	-	Peter Potter
Again Doctor	1969	Frederick Carver	Ellen Moore	Dr. Ernest Stoppidge	Gladstone Screwer	-	"Shuffling Patient"	Miss Soaper, the Matron	-	Dr. Jimmy Nookey	Goldie Locks	Miss Fosdick	-	-
Up the Jungle	1970	-	Lady Evelyn Bagley	King Tonka / Walter Bagley	Bill Boosey	Claude Chumley	-	-	Upsidaisi	-	-	-	-	Cecil Bagley, the Jungle Boy
Loving	1970	Percival Snooper	Esme Crowfoot	James Bedsop	Sidney Bliss	-	"Sinister Client" (uncredited)	Sophie Bliss/Plummett	Gripper Burke	-	-	Miss Dempsey	-	Terence Philpott
Henry	1971	Thomas Cromwell	Queen Marie of Normandy	Sir Roger de Lodgerley	King Henry VIII	Lord Hampton of Wick	Charles, Earl of Bristol (uncredited)	-	-	-	Bettina	Queen	-	Cardinal Wolsey
At Your Convenience	1971	W.C. Boggs	Chloe Moore	Charles Coote	Sid Plummer	-	-	Beattie Plummer	Bernie Hulke	-	-	Hortense Withering	-	Mr. Allcock (scenes deleted)
Matron	1972	Sir Bernard Cutting	Mrs. Tidey	Dr. Francis A. Goode	Sid Carter	Mr. Tidey	-	Miss Davis, the Matron	Ernie Bragg	-	Nurse Susan Ball	Evelyn Banks	"Twitching Father"	Dr. Prodd
Abroad	1972	Stuart Farquhar	Cora Flange	Eustace Tuttle	Vic Flange	Stanley Blunt	Pepe	Floella	Brother Bernard	-	Sadie Tomkins	Miss Dobbs	Harry	Irate Wundatours Customer (scenes deleted)
Girls	1973	-	Connie Philpotts	-	Cllr. Sidney Fiddler	Mayor Frederick Bumble	The Admiral	-	Peter Potter	-	Hope Springs	Mildred Bumble	William	-
Dick	1974	Capt. Desmond Fancey	Madame Desiree	-	Reverend Flasher / Dick Turpin	Constable	Tom	Martha Hoggett	Sir Roger Daley	-	Harriet / Harry	Mrs. Giles	Sgt. Jock Strapp	-
Behind	1975	Prof. Roland Crump	Daphne Barnes	-	-	Maj. Leep	Henry Barnes	-	Arthur Upmore	-	-	Linda Upmore	Ernie Bragg	-
England	1976	-	Pte. Jennifer Ffoukes-Sharpe	-	-	Capt. S. Melly	Maj. Carstairs	-	-	-	-	-	Bdr. Ready	-
That's...	1977	Presenter	archive	archive	archive	archive	archive	archive	archive	archive	Presenter	archive	archive	archive
Emmannuelle	1978	Emile Prevert	Mrs. Dangle	-	-	Leyland / Harry Hernia (voice)	Richmond	-	-	-	-	-	Lyons	-
Columbus	1992	-	-	-	-	-	-	-	-	Christopher Columbus	-	-	Marco the Cereal Killer	-
Appearance total		26	24	23	19	17	16	14	14	11	10	9	8	7

== Recurring cast members ==
This section looks at actors who starred or had at least one significant supporting role in at least one Carry On film plus at least one other supporting role, and those actors who appeared in at least four or more films in small or supporting roles. Surviving cast members' names are in bold

- Michael Nightingale (1922–1999) (13 films) made more Carry On appearances than any other member of the supporting cast. Out of these 13, four were uncredited appearances (Regardless, Don't Lose Your Head, Follow That Camel, and Girls). His nine credited appearances were in Cabby, Jack, Cleo, Cowboy, Camping, Matron, Dick, England, and Emmanuelle. He also appeared in two episodes of the Carry On Laughing TV series.
- Peter Gilmore (1931–2013) (11) usually had supporting roles. He occasionally played the villain, (Cabby, Jack, Don't Lose Your Head). He returned for Columbus.
- Marianne Stone (1922–2009) (9) played a range of minor and supporting roles across almost the entire run of the series (from Nurse to Behind). In addition to those 9 roles, her character in Matron was cut from the finished film, although she remained credited in the opening titles, whilst she provided uncredited voice-work in Constable when she dubbed actress Lucy Griffiths' dialogue. She also appeared in one episode of the Carry on Laughing TV series.
- **Billy Cornelius** (born 1934) (8) was a regular stuntman and small-part actor during much of the series. His most substantial role was as one of the monsters, Oddbod Jr., in Screaming. Other credited roles are in Again Doctor, Henry, and Dick. Additional uncredited roles are in Cowboy and Don't Lose Your Head. He also appeared in the 1970 Carry On Stuffing Christmas TV special, and three episodes on the Carry On Laughing TV series.
- Frank Forsyth (1905–1984) (8) was a regular small-part player. Although he was uncredited for his brief appearance in Again Doctor, his remaining roles gained him on-screen credits (Sergeant, Nurse, Constable, Cabby, Jack, Spying, and Screaming).
- Julian Holloway (1944–2025) (8) played several supporting roles, including one lead role (which was heavily cut during editing) in Camping. His role in At Your Convenience (which is included in his tally of 8) was an uncredited appearance. He also appeared in the 1973 Carry On Christmas TV special.
- Cyril Chamberlain (1909–1974) (7) was a regular actor in the early days of the series. He played small cameo roles in Sergeant and Regardless, but his roles in Nurse, Teacher, Constable, Cruising, and Cabby saw him getting more screen time in effective supporting roles.
- **Hugh Futcher** (born 1937) (7) played mostly small roles in Spying, At Your Convenience and Behind. He also had uncredited roles in Don't Lose Your Head, Again Doctor, and Girls.
- Gertan Klauber (1932–2008) (7) was frequently cast when the producers wanted someone big and sinister, or big and jovial. His most memorable role was in Cleo where he played Marcus to Warren Mitchell's Spencius. He had other roles in Spying, Doctor, Henry, Abroad, and Emmannuelle. He also appeared uncredited in Follow That Camel.
- Anthony Sagar (1920–1973) (7) had several minor roles from Sergeant to Loving, his role in Constable being uncredited. Additionally, he appeared in Henry but the scene (which also featured a young David Essex) was cut.
- Simon Cain (1938–2019) (6) had three credited roles (Cowboy, Again Doctor and At Your Convenience) as well as three uncredited ones (Follow That Camel, Doctor and Up the Khyber).
- Sally Douglas (1941–2001) (6) was a regular face to cinema and TV audience during the 1960s and early 1970s, frequently uncredited. She is credited for her appearances in Cowboy and Screaming (in which she has less than five minutes of screen time and is unconscious, having neither dialogue nor action), whilst her work on Jack, Spying, and Cleo went uncredited.
- Lucy Griffiths (1919–1982) (6) seemed to be perpetually elderly in most of her roles. She was credited with roles in Nurse, Constable (in which her voice was dubbed by Marianne Stone), Doctor, and Again Doctor. She appeared uncredited in Regardless and Behind, while her scene was cut out of Loving before release.
- **Valerie Leon** (born 1943) (6) initially played an uncredited role in Up the Khyber, before making brief, but credited, decorative appearances such as a shop girl (Camping) or a hospital patient (Matron). Other, larger roles included an Amazonian queen in Carry On Up the Jungle and a prim repressed woman turned beauty pageant contestant in Girls. She also appeared in the 1972 Carry On Christmas TV special. Her character in Girls was dubbed by June Whitfield. The role of Moira in Abroad was written with her in mind.
- Margaret Nolan (1943–2020) (6) usually played supporting roles, such as Dawn Brakes in Girls.
- Derek Francis (1923–1984) (6) played a wide range of supporting characters, from country yokels (Camping, Henry) to authority figures (Doctor, Matron) to clergymen (Loving, Abroad).
- Brian Osborne (1940–2021) (6) appeared in almost all of the later films in support roles (from Matron to England). Additionally, Osborne appeared in 7 episodes of the Carry On Laughing TV series.
- Ian Wilson (1901–1987) (6) was a diminutive actor who appeared in Cabby, plus memorable small roles in Jack (alongside Jim Dale), and the messenger in Cleo who has "come hotfoot from Rome". He also appeared, uncredited, in Constable, Regardless, and Cruising.
- Amelia Bayntun (1919–1988) (5) was frequently cast in small roles (almost a bit part in Convenience), notably as Joan Sims' busybody mother in Camping
- Tom Clegg (1927–1996) (5), usually in minor roles as 'heavies', but played a major role in Screaming as the Frankenstein's Monster parody, Oddbod.
- **Alexandra Dane** (born 1940) (5), initially had an uncredited role in Doctor she then had larger roles in sexier roles like Up the Khyber and Again Doctor. Other credited roles she had were in Loving and Behind.
- Ed Devereaux (1925–2003) (5) was an Australian-born actor who appeared in Sergeant, Nurse, Jack, Regardless, and Cruising.
- Patrick Durkin (1936–2009) (5) gave his powerfully built support in Sergeant, Nurse, Spying, and Dick. His role in Cowboy was uncredited.
- Joan Hickson (1906–1998) (5) The Miss Marple actress appeared in Nurse, Constable, Regardless, Loving and Girls.
- David Lodge (1921–2003) (5) started his Carry On career performing a cameo role in Regardless. 12 years later he returned to the team, this time playing more substantial supporting roles in Girls, Dick, Behind, and England. He also appeared in 7 episodes of the Carry On Laughing TV series.
- Bill Maynard (1928–2018) (5) played support roles in some early 1970s films: including Joan Sims' character's obtuse husband in At Your Convenience, a dim stooge in Matron, and a jovial inn keeper in Dick. Additionally, he filmed a scene as Kenneth Williams' boss for Abroad, but this was not included in the finished film. He was also offered the role eventually played by David Lodge in Girls, but had to turn it down due to other commitments.
- Victor Maddern (1928–1993) (5) played supporting roles in some of the 1960s films: including Milchmann, the milkman spy in Spying; also appeared in Emmannuelle (1978). He also appeared in three episodes of the Carry On Laughing TV series.
- Norman Mitchell (1918–2001) (5) appeared in Spying, Screaming, and Emmannuelle, with uncredited appearances in Cabby and Cleo.
- **Patricia Franklin** (born 1942) (5) appeared in Girls, Camping, Loving, Behind and England.
- Michael Ward (1909–1997) (5) brought a superb effete touch to Regardless, Cabby, Cleo, Screaming, and Don't Lose Your Head.
- Leslie Phillips (1924–2022) (4) appeared in three early films – Nurse, Teacher and Constable – after which he left the series only to return 32 years later for Columbus as the King of Spain.
- Eric Barker (1912–1990) (4), generally as authority figures in the early films, such as the M-like character in Spying. He also returned in Emmannuelle, the final film of the original run. He is also credited with submitting the original story idea on which Carry On Cruising is based.
- **Marian Collins** (born 1938) (4) was a regular in British cinema for nearly ten years, adding glamour in frequently uncredited roles. Her Carry On roles were all uncredited: Cruising, Cabby, Jack, and Spying.
- **Dominique Don** (born 1944) (4) added some uncredited Parisian-born glamour to Cabby, Jack, Follow That Camel, and Up The Khyber.
- Bill Owen (1914–1999) (4) Early Carry On regular who made his final appearance in Cabby
- Terence Longdon (1922–2011) (4) was an early Carry On regular who made his final appearance in Regardless. Starring roles were in Sergeant and Nurse, whilst he made a brief guest appearance in Constable.
- June Whitfield (1925–2018) (4) After a support role in Nurse she returned much later for lead roles in Abroad as a prudish, nagging wife, and an equally strait-laced character in Girls (in which she also dubbed the dialogue for Valerie Leon's character). These roles were similar to Hattie Jacques' early performances. She returned for Columbus in the role originally ear-marked for Joan Sims.
- Esma Cannon (1905–1972) (4) Australian actress who had small roles in Constable & Regardless and had larger roles in Cruising & Cabby.
- **Larry Dann** (born 1941) (4) had a small role as a student in Teacher (1959). Returned much later for support roles in Behind (1975), England (1976) and a main role in Emmannuelle (1978).
- Liz Fraser (1930–2018) (4) joined the series in Regardless and continued until Cabby. She returned 12 years later for a supporting role in Carry On Behind.
- Dilys Laye (1934–2009) (4) made her first appearance in Cruising. Also appeared in Spying, Doctor and Camping.
- **Angela Douglas** (born 1940) (4) played leading roles in Cowboy, Screaming, Follow that Camel and Up the Khyber.
- Julian Orchard (1930–1979) (4) made an uncredited appearance as a rake admiring Joan Sims' cleavage in Don't Lose Your Head. He followed this with a small role in Follow That Camel, and more significant supporting roles in Doctor and Henry.
- Brian Oulton (1908–1992) (4) played larger supporting roles in Nurse and Cleo, and cameo roles in Constable and Camping (both as shop managers). He also appeared in the 1972 TV Christmas special Carry On Stuffing.
- **Jacki Piper** (born 1946) (4) played the female romantic leads in Up the Jungle, Loving and At Your Convenience and a large supporting role Matron.
- Jon Pertwee (1919–1996) (4) had small roles such as the soothsayer in Carry On Cleo, Dr. Fettle in Carry On Screaming, Sheriff Earp in Carry On Cowboy. Returned in Carry On Columbus, as the Duke of Costa Brava.
- Valerie Van Ost (1944–2019) (4) started in the Carry Ons with an uncredited turn as a GlabCab taxi driver in Cabby. This was followed with supporting and cameo roles in Don't Lose Your Head, Doctor, and Again Doctor.
- John Bluthal (1929–2018) (3) played supporting roles in Spying and Follow That Camel. In Spying he also provided the voice of Dr Crow, dubbing actress Judith Furse to make her sound more asexual. He also had an uncredited 'gag' appearance in Henry playing the Royal Tailor. Bluthal was famous at the time for his role of tailor Manny Cohen in the TV sitcom Never Mind The Quality, Feel The Width.
- Kenneth Cope (1931–2024) (3) had major roles in both At Your Convenience, where he played a troublemaking shop steward and a rival for the romantic lead; in Matron he played a more sympathetic role, as a crook's son forced to go undercover as a nurse to case a hospital. However, his first Carry On appearance was as a walk-on actor playing a sailor in Jack.
- Bernard Cribbins (1928–2022) (3) played lead roles in Jack and Spying. Returned for Columbus.
- **Shirley Eaton** (born 1937) (3) played the original female lead in Sergeant & Nurse and returned for a smaller role in Constable.
- **Sally Geeson** (born 1950) (3) started her Carry On career, aged 11, in an uncredited cameo in Regardless. She returned in the large supporting role of Lily in Abroad, 11 years later, following it up the following year with a cameo appearance in Girls. She starred on TV alongside Sid James and Patsy Rowlands in Bless This House, joining them in the film version produced by Peter Rogers.
- Renée Houston (1902–1980) (3) appeared in small roles in Cabby and Spying before returning seven years later for a more substantial role in Convenience. She also accepted the role of Mrs Dukes in Girls, but had to withdraw due to ill health.
- Norman Rossington (1928–1999) (3) His principal role in Sergeant was followed up with two boxing themed cameo appearances in Nurse and Regardless. Additionally he returned to the team in the 1972 TV Christmas special Carry On Stuffing.
- **Amanda Barrie** (born 1935) (2) had a supporting role as Anthea in Cabby and the more substantial role of the title character in Cleo.
- Windsor Davies (1930–2019) (2) had lead roles in two later films, Carry On Behind and Carry On England which did not feature usual lead Sid James. Davies was an established television comedy actor at the time.
- Fenella Fielding (1927–2018) (2) had seductive performances in a supporting role in Regardless and a lead role in Screaming, as the vampiress Valeria.
- **Anita Harris** (born 1942) (2) had a substantial role in Doctor, followed by a smaller, but memorable, appearance in Follow That Camel
- **Carol Hawkins** (born 1949) (2) appeared in the large supporting roles of Marge in Abroad (a role originally offered to Madeline Smith) and Sandra in Behind. Carol also made an uncredited appearance in the 1970 Carry On Christmas TV special, and made two appearances in the TV series Carry On Laughing. She was offered a role in England, but turned it down due to excessive nudity.
- Percy Herbert (1920–1992) (2) had two large supporting roles in Jack and Cowboy.
- Frankie Howerd (1917–1992) (2). Leading comedy performer Howerd played lead roles in Carry On Doctor and Carry On Up the Jungle, He was offered other Carry On roles but had to turn them down due to other work commitments. Additionally, he appeared in the 1969 Carry On Christmas special as, amongst other things, the Fairy Godmother.
- June Jago (1928–2010) (2) saw promotion from a nurse in Regardless to the strict ward sister in Doctor, by far her largest role of the two. She also shone in the Peter Rogers film Please Turn Over where she played the same role in two different ways – one an uptight health fanatic, the other a pathetic love-lorn drunk.
- Peter Jones (1920–2000) (2) played the Chaplain in Doctor and a more significant role as the Brigadier in England.
- Rosalind Knight (1933–2020) (2) plays a side character in Nurse and a starring role in Teacher.
- Diane Langton (1944–2025) (2) made her uncredited debut as a young girl in Teacher before returning many years later to appear in England. Prior to England, she also appeared in three episodes of the TV Carry On Laughing series.
- Jimmy Logan (1928–2001) (2) had a minor role as a camp TV presenter in Girls and a central role in Abroad
- Betty Marsden (1919–1998) (2) had a small role as a mysterious woman in Regardless and a major role in Camping
- **Richard O'Callaghan** (born 1940) (2) played the male romantic lead in Loving and At Your Convenience.

=== Recurring actors in main roles ===
Title	Year	Actor												
Title	Year	Shirley Eaton	Eric Barker	Bill Owen	Terence Longdon	Leslie Phillips	June Whitfield	Esma Cannon	Liz Fraser	Dilys Laye	Angela Douglas	Jacki Piper	Kenneth Cope	Bernard Cribbins
Sergeant	1958	Mary Sage	Capt. Potts	Corp. Bill Copping	Miles Heywood	-	-	-	-	-	-	-	-	-
Nurse	1959	Staff Nurse Dorothy Denton	-	Percy Hickson	Ted York	Jack Bell	Meg	-	-	-	-	-	-	-
Teacher	1959	-	-	-	-	Alistair Grigg	-	-	-	-	-	-	-	-
Constable	1960	Sally Barry	Inspector Mills	-	Herbert Hall	Const. Tom Potter	-	Deaf Old Lady	-	-	-	-	-	-
Regardless	1961	-	-	Mike Weston	Montgomery Infield-Hopping	-	-	Miss Cooling	Delia King	-	-	-	-	-
Cruising	1962	-	-	-	-	-	-	Bridget Madderley	Glad Trimble	Flo Castle	-	-	-	-
Cabby	1963	-	-	Smiley Sims	-	-	-	Flo Sims	Sally	-	-	-	-	-
Jack	1963	-	-	-	-	-	-	-	-	-	-	-	Walk-On (uncredited)	Albert Poop-Decker
Spying	1964	-	The Chief	-	-	-	-	-	-	Lila	-	-	-	Harold Crump (aka Blue Bottle)
Cleo	1964	-	-	-	-	-	-	-	-	-	-	-	-	-
Cowboy	1965	-	-	-	-	-	-	-	-	-	Annie Oakley	-	-	-
Screaming!	1966	-	-	-	-	-	-	-	-	-	Doris Mann	-	-	-
Don't Lose Your Head	1966	-	-	-	-	-	-	-	-	-	-	-	-	-
Follow That Camel	1967	-	-	-	-	-	-	-	-	-	Lady Jane Ponsonby	-	-	-
Doctor	1967	-	-	-	-	-	-	-	-	Mavis Winkle	-	-	-	-
Up the Khyber	1968	-	-	-	-	-	-	-	-	-	Princess Jehli	-	-	-
Camping	1969	-	-	-	-	-	-	-	-	Anthea Meeks	-	-	-	-
Again Doctor	1969	-	-	-	-	-	-	-	-	-	-	-	-	-
Up the Jungle	1970	-	-	-	-	-	-	-	-	-	-	June	-	-
Loving	1970	-	-	-	-	-	-	-	-	-	-	Sally Martin	-	-
Henry	1971	-	-	-	-	-	-	-	-	-	-	-	-	-
At Your Convenience	1971	-	-	-	-	-	-	-	-	-	-	Myrtle Plummer	Vic Spanner	-
Matron	1972	-	-	-	-	-	-	-	-	-	-	Sister	Cyril Carter	-
Abroad	1972	-	-	-	-	-	Evelyn Blunt	-	-	-	-	-	-	-
Girls	1973	-	-	-	-	-	Augusta Prodworthy	-	-	-	-	-	-	-
Dick	1974	-	-	-	-	-	-	-	-	-	-	-	-	-
Behind	1975	-	-	-	-	-	-	-	Sylvia Ramsden	-	-	-	-	-
England	1976	-	-	-	-	-	-	-	-	-	-	-	-	-
That's...	1977	archive	archive	archive	archive	archive	archive	archive	-	archive	archive	archive	archive	archive
Emmannuelle	1978	-	Ancient General	-	-	-	-	-	-	-	-	-	-	-
Columbus	1992	-	-	-	-	King Ferdinand	Queen Isabella	-	-	-	-	-	-	Mordecai Mendoza

=== Notable recurring actors ===
Title	Year	Actor												
Title	Year	Michael Nightingale	Peter Gilmore	Marianne Stone	Julian Holloway	Cyril Chamberlain	Anthony Sagar	Lucy Griffiths	Valerie Leon	Margaret Nolan	Derek Francis	Joan Hickson	Bill Maynard	Patricia Franklin
Sergeant	1958	-	-	-	-	Gun Sergeant	Stores Sergeant	-	-	-	-	-	-	-
Nurse	1959	-	-	Mrs Alice Able	-	Bert Able	First Ambulance Man	Trolley Lady	-	-	-	Sister	-	-
Teacher	1959	-	-	-	-	Alf Hodgson	-	-	-	-	-	-	-	-
Constable	1960	-	-	Miss Horton (voice dub; uncredited)	-	Sgt. Thurston	Angry Customer (uncredited)	Miss Horton	-	-	-	Mrs May	-	-
Regardless	1961	Wine Bystander (uncredited)	-	-	-	Policeman	Bus Conductor	Auntie (uncredited)	-	-	-	Matron	-	-
Cruising	1962	-	-	-	-	Tom Tree	Cook	-	-	-	-	-	-	-
Cabby	1963	Businessman	Dancy	-	-	Sarge	-	-	-	-	-	-	-	-
Jack	1963	Town Crier	Patch, the Pirate Captain (a.k.a. Roger)	Peg	-	-	-	-	-	-	-	-	-	-
Spying	1964	-	-	-	-	Bit Part (uncredited)	-	-	-	-	-	-	-	-
Cleo	1964	Ancient Briton	Galley Master	-	-	-	-	-	-	-	-	-	-	-
Cowboy	1965	Bank Manager	Henchman Curly	-	-	-	-	-	-	Miss Jones	-	-	-	-
Screaming!	1966	-	-	Mrs Parker	-	-	Policeman	-	-	-	-	-	-	-
Don't Lose Your Head	1966	Locket Man (uncredited)	Citizen Robespierre	Landlady	-	-	-	-	-	-	-	-	-	-
Follow That Camel	1967	Nightingale, the butler (uncredited)	Capt. Humphrey Bagshaw	-	Ticket Collector	-	-	-	-	-	-	-	-	-
Doctor	1967	-	Henry	Mother	Doctor Simmons	-	-	Miss Morrison	-	-	Edmund Burke	-	-	-
Up the Khyber	1968	-	Pvte. Ginger Hale	-	Major Shorthouse	-	-	-	Hospitality Girl (uncredited)	-	-	-	-	-
Camping	1969	Man in Cinema	-	-	Jim Tanner	-	-	-	Miss Dobbin	-	Farmer	-	-	Farmer's Daughter
Again Doctor	1969	-	Henry	-	-	-	-	Old Lady with Headphones	Deirdre Filkington-Battermore	-	-	-	-	-
Up the Jungle	1970	-	-	-	-	-	-	-	Leda	-	-	-	-	-
Loving	1970	-	-	-	Adrian	-	Man in Hospital	Woman (scenes deleted)	-	-	Bishop	Mrs Grubb	Mr Dreery	Mrs Dreery
Henry	1971	-	King Francis of France	-	Sir Thomas	-	Heckler (scenes deleted)	-	-	Buxom Lass	Farmer	-	Guy Fawkes	-
At Your Convenience	1971	-	-	Maudie	Roger (uncredited)	-	-	-	-	Popsy	-	-	Fred Moore	-
Matron	1972	Pearson	-	Mrs Putzova (scenes deleted)	-	-	-	-	Jane Darling	Mrs Tucker	Arthur	-	Freddy	-
Abroad	1972	-	-	-	-	-	-	-	-	-	Brother Martin	-	Mr Fiddler (scenes deleted)	-
Girls	1973	City Gent on Tube (uncredited)	-	Miss Drew	-	-	-	-	Paula Perkins / Patricia Potter (dubbed by June Whitfield)	Dawn Brakes	-	Mrs Dukes	-	Rosemary
Dick	1974	Squire Trelawney	-	Maggie	-	-	-	-	-	Lady Daley	-	-	Bodkin	-
Behind	1975	-	-	Mrs Rowan	-	-	-	Lady with Hat (uncredited)	-	-	-	-	-	Vera Bragg
England	1976	Officer	-	-	Major Butcher	-	-	-	-	-	-	-	-	Corporal Cook
That's...	1977	archive	archive	archive	archive	archive	archive	archive	archive	archive	-	archive	-	-
Emmannuelle	1978	Police Commissioner	-	-	-	-	-	-	-	-	-	-	-	-
Columbus	1992	-	Governor of the Canaries	-	-	-	-	-	-	-	-	-	-	-

== Other actors in leading roles ==
Surviving cast members' names are in bold.

- **Robin Askwith** (born 1950), as Larry in Carry On Girls.
- Dora Bryan (1923–2014), as Nora in Carry On Sergeant.
- Roy Castle (1932–1994), as Captain Keene in Carry On Up the Khyber.
- **Julian Clary** (born 1959), as Don Juan Diego in Carry On Columbus.
- Harry H. Corbett (1925–1982), as Sergeant Sidney Bung in Carry On Screaming!.
- **Sara Crowe** (born 1966), as Fatima in Carry On Columbus.
- **Suzanne Danielle** (born 1957), as the title role in Carry On Emmannuelle.
- **Judy Geeson** (born 1948), as Sergeant Tilly Willing in Carry On England.
- **Gail Grainger** (born 1950), as Moira Plunkett in Carry On Abroad.
- William Hartnell (1908–1975), as Sergeant Grimshaw in Carry On Sergeant.
- Imogen Hassall (1942–1980), as Jenny Grubb in Carry On Loving.
- **Melvyn Hayes** (born 1935), as Gunner Shorthouse in England, plus an episode of Carry On Laughing.
- Wilfred Hyde-White (1903-1991), as the Colonel in Carry On Nurse.
- Donald Houston (1923–1991), as First Officer Jonathan Howett in Carry on Jack.
- **Maureen Lipman** (born 1946), as Countess Esmerelda in Carry On Columbus.
- **Juliet Mills** (born 1941), as Sally in Carry On Jack.
- Bob Monkhouse (1928–2003), as Charlie Sage in Carry On Sergeant.
- **Patrick Mower** (born 1938), as Sergeant Len Able in Carry On England.
- Richard O'Sullivan (1944–2026), as Robin Stevens in Carry On Teacher.
- Lance Percival (1933–2015), as Wilfred Haines in Carry On Cruising.
- **Adrienne Posta** (born 1949) as Norma Baxter in Carry On Behind.
- Ted Ray (1905–1977), as Mr William Wakefield in Carry On Teacher.
- Dany Robin (1927–1995), as Jacqueline in Don't Lose Your Head.
- **Alexei Sayle** (born 1952), as Achmed in Carry On Columbus.
- Phil Silvers (1911–1985), as Sergeant Knocker in Follow That Camel.
- Susan Stephen (1931–2000), as Nurse Georgie Axwell in Carry On Nurse.
- Elke Sommer (1940–2026), as Professor Anna Vrooshka in Carry On Behind.

== Other actors in supporting and minor roles ==
(In alphabetical order) Surviving cast members' names are in bold.

- **Vincent Ball** (born 1923) (2) had supporting roles in Cruising and Follow that Camel
- Gloria Best (Unknown) (3) added some unaccredited glamour to Spying, Cleo and Cowboy.
- Bruce Boa (1930–2004) (1) Emmannuelle.
- Martin Boddey (1907–1975) (2) appears in avuncular mode in Sergeant and Nurse.
- Wilfred Brambell (1912–1985) (1) as a patient in Carry On Again Doctor.
- Johnny Briggs (1935–2021) (3) had small, unaccredited roles in Up The Khyber and Behind (in which the role of his Plasterer mostly hit the cutting room floor). He had a larger role as Melly's Driver in England. He also appeared in one episode of the Carry On Laughing TV series.
- Ronnie Brody (1918–1991) (2) made his first unaccredited appearance in Don't Lose Your Head, followed up by the small role of Henry in Loving. Brody also appeared in 2 episodes of the Carry On Laughing TV series.
- Ray Brooks (1939–2025) (1) had a sizeable supporting role in Abroad.
- Jeremy Bulloch (1945–2020) (1) made an unaccredited appearance as a schoolboy in Teacher.
- Gerald Campion (1921–2002) (1) had a sizeable supporting role in Sergeant.
- **Brian Capron** (born 1947) (0), the future Coronation Street baddie does not appear in any Carry On films. He does, however, feature in two episodes of the Carry On Laughing TV series.
- Patrick Cargill (1918–1996) (2) appeared in Regardless and Jack. Carry On Nurse is based in part on the stage play Ring For Catty which he co-wrote with Jack Beale. Three years later Peter Rogers used the same play as the basis for his film Twice Round The Daffodils.
- John Carlin (1929–2017) (2) made just two small appearances in the film series (in England and Emmannuelle). However, before these roles he had been seen as a semi-regular performer (frequently 'camping it up') in the Carry On Laughing TV series, notching up six episodes.
- Norman Chappell (1925–1983) (2) made his Carry On debut in Cabby in a role originally offered to Kenneth Williams. When Williams refused it, the part of the Shop Steward was decreased and offered to Chappell. His other appearance was in Henry. He was also to appear in Loving, but his part was edited out of the film before release. He was more of a regular performer in the Carry On Laughing TV series where he made 7 appearances.
- Peggy Ann Clifford (1921–1986) (1) was Tony Hancock's regular, female, television sparring partner, and makes an unaccredited guest appearance in Cleo.
- David Davenport (1921–1995) (3) was a former ballet dancer whose major Carry On contribution was in the significant supporting role of Bilius the bodyguard in Cleo. He also appeared in Don't Lose Your Head and Henry.
- Francis de Wolff (1913–1984) (1) put in a supporting role in Cleo.
- Noel Dyson (1916–1995) (2) was everyone's favourite nanny in Father, Dear Father, and a founder cast member in Coronation Street. She appeared in Constable and Cabby.
- Heather Emmanuel (Unknown) (2) made uncredited appearances as native girls in Again Doctor and Up the Jungle.
- E. V. H. Emmett (1902–1971) (1) brought his newsreading authority to the narrator of Cleo. Although several other films in the series used a narrator, none used them as effectively as Cleo where the conceit runs throughout the film. Emmett was the only person to get credited for narrating a Carry On film. He had previously been a Gaumont British News newsreader and commentator, and also provided narration for the first series of Dad's Army.
- Hilda Fenemore (1914–2004) (2) had a main part in Nurse as a snob's loud-mouthed wife, and had a cameo appearance in Constable as a woman who wanted to use the public convenience. She is best remembered as Ivy, the cleaner in Are You Being Served?.
- **Charles Fleischer** (born 1950) (1) Columbus.
- Joanna Ford (Unknown) (2) added some unaccredited sex-appeal to Cabby and Cleo.
- Judith Furse (1912–1974) (3) brought her personality to Regardless, Cabby, and, most memorably, as Dr Crow in Spying, the film's take on the traditional Bond villain. For the latter role her voice was redubbed by John Bluthal in order to give the character a more asexual sound.
- Fred Griffiths (1912–1994) (3) appears as an ambulance man in Nurse, and as a taxi driver in Regardless and Loving.
- **Sheila Hancock** (born 1933) (1) lends her comic support to Cleo as Hengist Pod's wife Senna.
- Irene Handl (1901–1987) (2) appeared in Nurse and Constable.
- **Sherrie Hewson** (born 1950) (1) appeared in the large supporting role of Carol in Behind. However, she also made 4 appearances in the Carry On Laughing TV series.
- **Linda Hooks** (born 1952) (3) the former Miss Great Britain had small glamorous roles in 3 later films, plus two appearances in episodes on the Carry On Laughing TV series.
- Geoffrey Hughes (1944–2012) (1) played Willie in Carry on at your Convenience.
- **Laraine Humphrys** (born 1953) (2) brought glamour to Girls and Dick. Laraine also appeared in the 1973 Carry On Christmas TV special.
- Brian Jackson (1931–2022) (1) Second recruit in Sergeant.
- **Vivienne Johnson** (born 1946) (1) is only credited with appearing in England. However, the previous year had seen her make three significant appearances in the Carry On Laughing TV series.
- Elizabeth Knight (1944–2005) (2) makes eye-catching appearances in Camping (as Jane), and Again Doctor (as Nurse Willing).
- Ian Lavender (1946–2024) (1) has a large supporting role in Behind.
- **George Layton** (born 1942) (1) was probably best known at the time for playing Dr Paul Collier in the Doctor... TV series. In Behind he makes a 'gag' appearance as a Doctor. He also co-wrote an unused script for a potential Carry On film in the 1980s.
- Tutte Lemkow (1918–1991) (1) brought his distinctive face to British film and television productions for 40 years. Sadly, his only Carry On contribution was as an unaccredited walk-on in Spying.
- **John Levene** (born 1941) (0) made an unaccredited 'gag' appearance in one of the Carry On Laughing TV episodes. Best known for playing UNIT soldier Corporal Benton in Doctor Who, he appears briefly as a mediaeval soldier in the episode The Baron Outlook. He did not appear in any of the films.
- Harry Locke (1913–1987) (3) was a well-used supporting artist within the British film industry. His 3 Carry On appearances are all in medical comedies: Nurse, Doctor, and Again Doctor.
- **Reuben Martin** (1921–1993) (2) played gorillas in both Up The Jungle and Emmannuelle (the latter unaccredited). He also donned his gorilla suit for an episode of the TV Carry On Laughing series.
- Derek Martinus (1931–2014) (1) appeared in just one of the series, Sergeant. He went on to become a TV director of note, directing (amongst other things) 9 episodes of William Hartnell era Doctor Who, 17 further episodes of Doctor Who, and 2 episodes of Blake's 7.
- Larry Martyn (1934–1994) (2) had small roles in Convenience and Behind.
- Rik Mayall (1958–2014) (1) Columbus.
- William Mervyn (1912–1976) (3) has cameo roles in Follow That Camel, Again Doctor, and Henry.
- Olive Milbourne (1909–1994) (1) later found fame as Terry's mum in The Likely Lads (on both TV and radio), and its sequel Whatever Happened To The Likely Lads, but an early unaccredited appearance was as a sexy GlamCab driver in Cabby.
- **Larry Miller** (born 1953) (1) Columbus.
- Warren Mitchell (1926–2015) (1) made an entertaining, single appearance in Cleo. He went on to create the role of Alf Garnett for writer Johnny Speight.
- Trisha Noble (1944–2021) (1) had a large supporting role in Camping, but her role was decreased during editing.
- Cecil Parker (1897–1971) (1) makes a guest appearance topping-and-tailing Jack.
- **Daniel Peacock** (born 1958) (1) Columbus.
- Ambrosine Phillpotts (1912–1980) (2) brings an aristocratic air to Regardless and Cabby.
- Eric Pohlmann (1913–1979) (2) brings something sinister to Regardless, and shines in the supporting role of a foreign spy in Spying.
- Brian Rawlinson (1931–2000) (3) appeared in Cruising, Cleo and Cowboy.
- **Linda Regan** (born 1949) (1) appears as one of the ATS girls in England. Six years earlier she had also appeared uncredited in the 1970 Carry On Again Christmas TV special.
- Beryl Reid (1919–1996) (1) made a guest appearance in Emmannuelle.
- Wendy Richard (1943–2009) (2) made her Carry On film debut in Matron, following it up with a larger supporting role in Girls. However, two years earlier she had also appeared in the 1970 Carry On Christmas TV special.
- Anton Rodgers (1933–2007) (2) appeared in Cruising and Jack.
- Carole Shelley (1939–2018) (2) brought 'ditzy' glamour to Regardless and Cabby.
- Vicki Smith (Unknown) (3) added unaccredited sex-appeal to Spying, Cleo, and Cowboy.
- **Yutte Stensgaard** (born 1946) (1) made an unaccredited appearance in Again Doctor as a nurse. She also filmed a scene for Loving alongside Dad's Army star James Beck, but their scene was removed from the film before release.
- Jimmy Thompson (1925–2005) (3) appeared in Regardless and Jack, with a large supporting role in Cruising in the middle.
- Bob Todd (1921–1992) (1) makes an unaccredited 'gag' appearance in Again Doctor. He also appeared in the 1970 Carry On Again Christmas TV special.
- Nikki van der Zyl (1935–2021) (2) was one of British cinema's most prolific voice-over artistes, dubbing many of the original Bond girls (including Shirley Eaton in Goldfinger). She appears unaccredited in two of the films, none of them dubbing work. In Cleo she doubles for Amanda Barrie when Cleo is rolled out of her carpet, whilst in Don't Lose Your Head she provides stunt work and appears as the messenger who brings a letter to Charles Hawtrey at the start of the film when he is about to be executed.
- **Wanda Ventham** (born 1935) (2) has an unaccredited cameo in Cleo, and a slightly larger role as the Khasi's first wife in Up The Khyber.
- Kenneth Waller (1927–2000) (1) stepped into the role of the Barman in Behind at the last minute replacing the now unavailable Chris Gannon.
- Brian Wilde (1927–2008) (1) appeared briefly as a salesman in Doctor but his scenes in Henry were deleted. Later became well-known to television viewers as a sitcom actor.
