= Carry On Dick =

1974 British comedy film by Gerald Thomas

- Original UK quad poster
- Directed by: Gerald Thomas
- Written by: Talbot Rothwell
- Produced by: Peter Rogers
- Starring: Sid James; Barbara Windsor; Kenneth Williams; Hattie Jacques; Bernard Bresslaw; Joan Sims; Kenneth Connor; Peter Butterworth; Jack Douglas
- Cinematography: Ernest Steward
- Edited by: Alfred Roome
- Music by: Eric Rogers
- Distributed by: The Rank Organisation
- Release date: 12 July 1974
- Running time: 91 minutes
- Country: United Kingdom
- Language: English
- Budget: £212,948

Carry On Dick is a 1974 British comedy film, the 26th release in the series of 31 Carry On films (1958–1992). The story is based on the Dick Turpin legend and features Turpin (James) as an antihero, attempting to evade capture by the authorities.

Carry On Dick was released in July 1974 and marked the end of an era for the series. It features the last appearances of Sid James (after nineteen appearances in the series prior to his death two years later from a heart attack), Hattie Jacques (fourteen appearances) and Barbara Windsor (nine appearances), although all three would appear in the Carry On Laughing TV series and Windsor would co-present a film compilation, That's Carry On!. It was the first of two Carry On appearances for Sam Kelly and the final Carry On film for Margaret Nolan (six appearances) and Bill Maynard (five appearances). It was the 20th and final Carry On to be scripted by Talbot Rothwell. Other regulars in Carry On Dick were Kenneth Williams, Bernard Bresslaw, Joan Sims, Kenneth Connor, Peter Butterworth, Patsy Rowlands and Jack Douglas. The film was followed by Carry On Behind in 1975.

One of the scenes of this movie incidentally features the marriage bed of Henry VII as a stage prop.

== Plot ==
In the year 1750, England is rife with crime and highway robbers. To stop the wave of chaos, King George II sets up the first professional police force named the Bow Street Runners, under the command of the bellowing Sir Roger Daley, and seconded by Captain Desmond Fancey and Sergeant Jock Strapp. The Runners are apparently in wiping out crime and lawlessness, using all manner of traps and tricks. The exception is the notorious Richard "Big Dick" Turpin, a highwayman who has evaded capture and succeeded in even robbing Sir Roger and his prim wife of their money and clothing. After this humiliation, Turpin becomes the Bow Street Runners' most wanted man, and Captain Fancey is assigned to go undercover and bring Turpin to justice.

The Bow Street Runners nearly succeed in apprehending Turpin and his two partners in crime, Harriet and Tom, one evening as they hold up a coach carrying faux-French show-woman Madame Desiree and her unladylike daughters "The Birds of Paradise." However, Turpin manages to outsmart the Runners, sending them away in Madam Desiree's coach.

Outraged by Strapp's incompetence, Captain Fancey travels with the sergeant to the village of Upper Dencher near to where the majority of Turpin's hold-ups are carried out. There they encounter the mild-mannered Reverend Flasher, who is really Turpin in disguise, with Tom as his church assistant and Harriet as his maidservant. They confide in the rector their true identities and their scheme to apprehend Turpin. They agree to meet at the seedy Old Cock Inn, a notorious hang-out for criminals and sleazy types, and where Desiree and her showgirls are performing. Fancey and Strapp pose as two on-the-run crooks, and they hear from the greasy old hag Maggie, a midwife who removed buckshot from Turpin's buttock, that Turpin has a curious birthmark on his manhood. Strapp wastes no time in carrying out an inspection in the public convenience of the Old Cock Inn.

When the rector arrives, he discovers their knowledge of the birthmark, and sweet talks Desiree into assisting him with the capture of "Turpin", whom the rector has told Desiree is actually Fancey, who is sitting downstairs in the bar. She lures Fancey to her room and attempts to undress him, with the help of her wild daughters. The girls pull down his breeches but fail to find an incriminating birthmark, and Fancey staggers half-undressed into the bar. Strapp is also dumped into a horse trough for peeping at the men in the toilets.

Strapp and Fancey send a message to Sir Roger about the birthmark, and are accosted by a disguised Harriet who tells them to meet Turpin that night at ten o'clock. Meanwhile, Tom tells the local constable that he knows where Turpin will be that night – at the location Harriet told Strapp and Fancey to wait. Thus, they are imprisoned as Turpin and his mate, and Sir Roger is yet again robbed on his way to see the prisoners.

However things fall apart when the rector's housekeeper, Martha Hoggett begins to put two and two together when Mrs Giles, apparently sick and used for a cover-up story for Dick's raids, is seen fit and well at the church jumble sale. Later that day, Harriet is caught at the Old Cock Inn where Fancey, Strapp and Daley are meeting and Fancey recognises her as the "man" who conned them into being caught. She is chased into Desiree's room and is told to undress to show the infamous birthmark. They soon realise she is a woman and are prepared to let her go, but lock her up after Lady Daley recognises a bracelet that Harriet is wearing as one Turpin stole from her.

With the net tightening, the Reverend Flasher gives an elongated sermon before outwitting his would-be captors and making a speedy getaway, with Harriett and Tom, across the border.

== Cast ==
- Sid James as The Reverend Flasher/Dick Turpin
- Kenneth Williams as Captain Desmond Fancey
- Barbara Windsor as Harriett
- Hattie Jacques as Martha Hoggett
- Bernard Bresslaw as Sir Roger Daley
- Joan Sims as Madame Desiree
- Peter Butterworth as Tom
- Kenneth Connor as Constable
- Jack Douglas as Sergeant Jock Strapp
- Marianne Stone as Maggie
- Patsy Rowlands as Mrs Giles
- Bill Maynard as Bodkin
- Margaret Nolan as Lady Daley
- John Clive as Isaak
- David Lodge as Bullock
- Patrick Durkin as William
- Sam Kelly as Sir Roger's coachman
- George Moon as Mr Giles
- Michael Nightingale as Squire Trelawney
- Brian Osborne as Browning
- Anthony Bailey as Rider
- Brian Coburn as Highwayman
- Max Faulkner as Highwayman
- Jeremy Connor as Footpad
- Nosher Powell as Footpad
- Joy Harington as Lady
- Larry Taylor as Tough man
- Billy Cornelius as Tough man
- Laraine Humphrys as Bird of Paradise
- Linda Hooks as Bird of Paradise
- Penny Irving as Bird of Paradise
- Eva Rueber-Staier as Bird of Paradise

== Crew ==
- Screenplay – Talbot Rothwell
- Treatment – Lawrie Wyman & George Evans
- Music – Eric Rogers
- Production Manager – Roy Goddard
- Art Director – Lionel Couch
- Editor – Alfred Roome
- Director of Photography – Ernest Steward
- Camera Operator – Jimmy Devis
- Continuity – Jane Buck
- Assistant Director – David Bracknell
- Sound Recordists – Danny Daniel & Ken Barker
- Make-up – Geoffrey Rodway
- Hairdresser – Stella Rivers
- Costume Design – Courtenay Elliott
- Set Dresser – Charles Bishop
- Dubbing Editor – Peter Best
- Horse Master – Gerry Wain
- Assistant Editor – Jack Gardner
- Casting Director – John Owen
- Stills Cameraman – Tom Cadman
- Wardrobe Mistresses – Vi Murray & Maggie Lewin
- Coach & Horses – George Mossman
- Titles – GSE Ltd
- Processor – Rank Film Laboratories
- Producer – Peter Rogers
- Director – Gerald Thomas

== Filming and locations ==
- Filming dates – 4 March-11 April 1974

Interiors:

- Pinewood Studios, Buckinghamshire

Exteriors:

- Countryside and woodland near Pinewood Studios at Black Park, Iver Heath, Buckinghamshire
- The Jolly Woodman Pub, Iver Heath, Buckinghamshire
- Stoke Poges Manor, Stoke Poges, Buckinghamshire
- St Mary's Church, Burnham, Buckinghamshire

The Rank Organisation financed four films in 1974, Carry on Dick, Carry On Girls, The Belstone Fox and Don't Just Lie There, Say Something, and partly financed Soft Beds, Hard Battles and Caravan to Vaccares.

== Bibliography ==
- Davidson, Andy (2012). Carry On Confidential. London: Miwk. ISBN 978-1-908630-01-8.
- Sheridan, Simon (2011). Keeping the British End Up – Four Decades of Saucy Cinema. London: Titan Books. ISBN 978-0-85768-279-6.
- Webber, Richard (2009). 50 Years of Carry On. London: Arrow. ISBN 978-0-09-949007-4.
- Hudis, Norman (2008). No Laughing Matter. London: Apex. ISBN 978-1-906358-15-0.
- Keeping the British End Up: Four Decades of Saucy Cinema by Simon Sheridan (third edition) (2007) (Reynolds & Hearn Books)
- Ross, Robert (2002). The Carry On Companion. London: Batsford. ISBN 978-0-7134-8771-8.
- Bright, Morris; Ross, Robert (2000). Mr Carry On – The Life & Work of Peter Rogers. London: BBC Books. ISBN 978-0-563-55183-6.
- Rigelsford, Adrian (1996). Carry On Laughing – a celebration. London: Virgin. ISBN 1-85227-554-5.
- Hibbin, Sally & Nina (1988). What a Carry On. London: Hamlyn. ISBN 978-0-600-55819-4.
- Eastaugh, Kenneth (1978). The Carry On Book. London: David & Charles. ISBN 978-0-7153-7403-0.
