= Carry On Again Doctor =

1969 British comedy film by Gerald Thomas

- Original UK quad poster by Renato Fratini
- Directed by: Gerald Thomas
- Written by: Talbot Rothwell
- Produced by: Peter Rogers
- Starring: Sid James; Kenneth Williams; Charles Hawtrey; Jim Dale; Joan Sims; Barbara Windsor; Hattie Jacques
- Cinematography: Ernest Steward
- Edited by: Alfred Roome
- Music by: Eric Rogers
- Production company: Rank Organisation
- Distributed by: Rank Film Distributors
- Release date: 2 December 1969
- Running time: 89 minutes
- Country: United Kingdom
- Language: English
- Budget: £219,000

Carry On Again Doctor is a 1969 British comedy film, the 18th release in the series of 31 Carry On films (1958–1992). It was released in December 1969 and was the third to feature a medical theme. The film features series regulars Sid James, Kenneth Williams, Charles Hawtrey, Joan Sims, Barbara Windsor and Hattie Jacques. This was Jim Dale's last Carry On appearance for 23 years until his return in Carry On Columbus. It also marks the debut of Patsy Rowlands to the series in her first of 9 appearances. Alongside James, Rowlands who also appears in the ITV sitcom Bless This House from 1971 to 1976. The film was followed by Carry On Up the Jungle in 1970.

== Plot ==
At the Long Hampton Hospital, Dr Jimmy Nookey seems to attract trouble, beginning with an incident where he enters the women's washroom by mistake, frightening the highly-strung Miss Armitage out of her senses. Nookey's carefree manner is not to everyone's liking, with Dr. Stoppidge wanting Nookey sacked for the washroom incident. Accident-prone Nookey then quickly falls in love with a film star patient named Goldie Locks. During some misadventures with the X-ray machine, Nookey triggers a massive short circuit in the hospital's electrical system, resulting in more mayhem. With the sympathetic Matron and his moody boss Dr. Frederick Carver now watching his every move, Dr. Nookey drinks, at a staff party, a fruit punch spiked by jealous Dr. Stoppidge. The drunk Nookey, after almost getting into bed with a patient, ends up on a hospital trolley which crashes through a window. Goldie leaves him because he is not interested in marriage. Meanwhile, Carver and his rich patient Ellen Moore, dispatch the disgraced Nookey to Moore's medical mission in the Beatific Islands, where it rains for nine months of the year. Nookey discovers Gladstone Screwer, the local medicine man, who has a weight-loss serum. Nookey soon returns to England and opens a new surgery with Mrs. Moore, angering Carver. While Matron joins Dr. Nookey's clinic, Carver and Stoppidge plot to try to steal the serum. Stoppidge dresses as a female patient to effect the theft, but his luck runs out when Nookey catches him in the act. Goldie returns to take the serum, much to Nookey's chagrin. Gladstone quickly discovers that Nookey is making a fortune from his serum, and cuts off his supply to deliver the product in person and get in on the action. Nookey prevaricates, so Gladstone gives him a dose, which seems to cause sex changes. The movie ends with Nookey and Goldie getting married at the Moore-Nookey-Gladstone-Carver facility, and the rest of the staff of the Long Hampton Hospital becoming friends again.

== Cast ==
- Sid James as Gladstone Screwer
- Jim Dale as Doctor Jimmy Nookey
- Kenneth Williams as Doctor Frederick Carver
- Charles Hawtrey as Doctor Ernest Stoppidge/Lady Puddleton
- Joan Sims as Ellen Moore
- Barbara Windsor as Goldie Locks (real name Maud Boggins)
- Hattie Jacques as Miss Soaper, the Matron
- Patsy Rowlands as Miss Fosdick
- Peter Butterworth as Shuffling patient
- Wilfrid Brambell as Mr Pullen (uncredited cameo)
- Elizabeth Knight as Nurse Willing
- Peter Gilmore as Henry
- Alexandra Dane as Stout woman
- Pat Coombs as New Matron
- William Mervyn as Lord Paragon
- Patricia Hayes as Mrs Beasley
- Lucy Griffiths as Old lady in headphones
- Harry Locke as Porter
- Gwendolyn Watts as Night Sister
- Valerie Leon as Deirdre Filkington-Battermore
- Frank Singuineau as Native Porter
- Valerie Van Ost as Outpatients Sister
- Simon Cain as X-ray man
- Elspeth March as Hospital board member
- Billy Cornelius as Patient in Plaster
- Valerie Shute as Nurse
- Ann Lancaster as Miss Armitage
- Frank Forsyth as Mr Bean (uncredited)
- Hugh Futcher as Taxi Driver (uncredited)
- Yutte Stensgaard as Trolley Nurse (uncredited)

== Production notes ==
The original script for Carry On Again Doctor raised problems with Rank's legal adviser, who felt it was too similar to an unfilmed 'Doctor' script that Talbot Rothwell, writer of Carry On Again Doctor, had previously submitted to producer Betty Box. Most notably, both scenarios featured the medical mission/slimming potion idea. As Box had not taken up the option on Rothwell's 'Doctor' script, however, it was felt there were no legal problems with the use of those ideas in this film.

The opening bars of the title music are the same used for Carry On Camping. During the party scene, Eric Rogers plays "Magic of Love" (from Carry On Spying), "Call Me a Cab" (from Carry On Cabby) and a rumba score which was used later in Carry On Abroad.

Eric Rogers arranges the theme from Steptoe and Son when Wilfrid Brambell appears, as he did with Harry H. Corbett in Carry On Screaming!.

== Crew ==
- Screenplay – Talbot Rothwell
- Music – Eric Rogers
- Production manager – Jack Swinburne
- Art director – John Blezard
- Editor – Alfred Roome
- Director of photography – Ernest Steward
- Camera operator – James Bawden
- Assistant editor – Jack Gardner
- Continuity – Susanna Merry
- Make-up – Geoffrey Rodway
- Assistant director – Ivor Powell
- Sound recordists – Bill Daniels & Ken Barker
- Hairdresser – Stella Rivers
- Costume designer – Anna Duse
- Dubbing editor – Colin Miller
- Producer – Peter Rogers
- Director – Gerald Thomas

== Filming and locations ==
- Filming dates – 17 March – 2 May 1969

Interiors:

- Pinewood Studios, Buckinghamshire

Exteriors:

- Maidenhead, where the town hall doubled for the hospital as it previously did in Carry On Doctor.
- Pinewood Studios. Heatherden Hall, the studio management block was used as the exterior for the Moore-Nookey Clinic
- Windsor, Berkshire. Location of Dr Nookey's consulting rooms (the same location featured in Carry On Regardless as the Helping Hands Agency and in Carry On Loving as the Wedded Bliss agency).

== Release ==
When the film was released by American International Pictures in New York in February 1973, they released it under the title Carry on Doctor.

The sequence where Dr Nookie short circuits the hospital's electrical system and the ensuing mayhem formed introduction to the 1980s compilation show Carry On Laughing.

== Critical reception ==
Empire wrote "The fast moving plot and changing locations keep the show moving, and makes this one of the more successful entries in the series."

== Bibliography ==
- Davidson, Andy (2012). Carry On Confidential. London: Miwk. ISBN 978-1-908630-01-8.
- Sheridan, Simon (2011). Keeping the British End Up – Four Decades of Saucy Cinema. London: Titan Books. ISBN 978-0-85768-279-6.
- Webber, Richard (2009). 50 Years of Carry On. London: Arrow. ISBN 978-0-09-949007-4.
- Hudis, Norman (2008). No Laughing Matter. London: Apex. ISBN 978-1-906358-15-0.
- Keeping the British End Up: Four Decades of Saucy Cinema by Simon Sheridan (third edition) (2007) (Reynolds & Hearn Books)
- Ross, Robert (2002). The Carry On Companion. London: Batsford. ISBN 978-0-7134-8771-8.
- Bright, Morris; Ross, Robert (2000). Mr Carry On – The Life & Work of Peter Rogers. London: BBC Books. ISBN 978-0-563-55183-6.
- Rigelsford, Adrian (1996). Carry On Laughing – a celebration. London: Virgin. ISBN 1-85227-554-5.
- Hibbin, Sally & Nina (1988). What a Carry On. London: Hamlyn. ISBN 978-0-600-55819-4.
- Eastaugh, Kenneth (1978). The Carry On Book. London: David & Charles. ISBN 978-0-7153-7403-0.
