= Carry On Behind =

1975 British comedy film by Gerald Thomas

- Original UK quad poster
- Directed by: Gerald Thomas
- Written by: Dave Freeman
- Produced by: Peter Rogers
- Starring: Elke Sommer; Kenneth Williams; Bernard Bresslaw; Kenneth Connor; Jack Douglas; Joan Sims; Windsor Davies; Peter Butterworth; Liz Fraser
- Cinematography: Ernest Steward
- Edited by: Alfred Roome
- Music by: Eric Rogers
- Distributed by: Rank Organisation
- Release date: 19 December 1975
- Running time: 86 minutes
- Country: United Kingdom
- Language: English
- Budget: £217,000

Carry On Behind is a 1975 British comedy film, the 27th release in the series of 31 Carry On films (1958–1992). It was the first entry in the series not to be scripted by Talbot Rothwell since Carry On Cruising 13 years previously. Also missing was series stalwart Sid James. James was busy touring in a play, while Rothwell's health prevented him from writing. The series' regular actors present are Kenneth Williams, Kenneth Connor, Jack Douglas, Joan Sims, Peter Butterworth, Bernard Bresslaw and Patsy Rowlands. Carry On Behind was the final picture in the series for Bresslaw (in his 14th appearance), Liz Fraser (in her fourth) and Rowlands (in her ninth) as well as Carol Hawkins (in her second). It saw the only appearances of Elke Sommer, Adrienne Posta, Sherrie Hewson and Ian Lavender in a Carry On film, and was the first of two entries in the series for Windsor Davies. The film was followed by Carry On England in 1976.

== Plot ==
Frustrated butcher Fred Ramsden and his dim electrician friend Ernie Bragg happily head off for a holiday trip at the Riverside Caravan Site, while their respective wives Sylvia and Vera look forward to their health farm holiday. Once at the caravan site of Major Leap, Fred starts making eyes at two young female campers, Carol and Sandra. However, as Ernie talks in his sleep and any infidelities are likely to be spoken of in the marital bed after their holiday, Fred is despondent. Professor Roland Crump teams with Roman expert Anna Vrooshka in an archaeological dig at the site. Arthur Upmore and his wife Linda are saddled with her mother Daphne and her vulgar mynah bird. Arthur is caught in a compromising position with attractive blonde Norma Baxter, whose husband Joe is lumbered with their giant Irish Wolfhound.

After a few drinks with the amused pub landlord, Fred and Ernie discover that the caravan site is riddled with excavation holes. Daphne is perturbed by the discovery that her estranged husband Henry Barnes lives a downtrodden life as the camp's odd-job man, despite having won the pools. Major Leap is determined to give the place a boost and arranges an evening cabaret for the caravanners, but a mix-up over the phone secures a stripper, Veronica, rather than the singer he wanted. Carol and Sandra having hooked up with archaeology students Bob and Clive, Fred and Ernie pick up Maureen and Sally, two beautiful young women from the village. Some wet paint, some glue, heavy rain that causes the tunnels of the dig to collapse, and the arrival of their wives soon bring their planned night of passion to a halt.

== Casting ==
The main roles are played by Carry On regulars Kenneth Williams, Bernard Bresslaw, Peter Butterworth, Joan Sims, Kenneth Connor, Jack Douglas and Patsy Rowlands. Newcomers to the series in major roles are Windsor Davies and Elke Sommer. Sims played the role of Rowlands's mother, though she was only eight months older than her screen daughter.

Supporting roles are played by Sherrie Hewson, Carol Hawkins, Ian Lavender, Adrienne Posta, George Layton, Larry Dann, Larry Martyn and David Lodge. These supporting players were mostly recognisable comedy actors at the time, but not long-term regular members of the Carry On team. Liz Fraser had appeared in three of the early films in the series; her re-appearance here was after a gap of twelve years.

== Filming ==
In 2023, actor Larry Dann dedicated a chapter of his autobiography Oh, What A Lovely Memoir to his memories of the making of this production.

== Cast ==
- Elke Sommer as Professor Anna Vooshka
- Kenneth Williams as Professor Roland Crump
- Bernard Bresslaw as Arthur Upmore
- Kenneth Connor as Major Leap
- Jack Douglas as Ernie Bragg
- Joan Sims as Daphne Barnes
- Windsor Davies as Fred Ramsden
- Peter Butterworth as Henry Barnes
- Liz Fraser as Sylvia Ramsden
- Patsy Rowlands as Linda Upmore
- Ian Lavender as Joe Baxter
- Adrienne Posta as Norma Baxter
- Patricia Franklin as Vera Bragg
- Carol Hawkins as Sandra
- Sherrie Hewson as Carol
- David Lodge as landlord
- Marianne Stone as Mrs Elsie Rowan
- George Layton as Doctor
- Brian Osborne as Bob
- Larry Dann as Clive
- Georgina Moon as Sally
- Diana Darvey as Maureen
- Donald Hewlett as The Dean
- Jenny Cox as Veronica [stripper]
- Larry Martyn as electrician
- Linda Hooks as nurse
- Kenneth Waller as barman
- Billy Cornelius as man with salad
- Melita Manger as woman with salad
- Hugh Futcher as painter
- Helli Louise as nude woman in shower
- Jeremy Connor as student with ice cream
- Alexandra Dane as lady in low-cut dress
- Sam Kelly as projectionist (uncredited)
- Johnny Briggs as plasterer (uncredited)
- Lucy Griffiths as lady with hat (uncredited)
- Stanley McGeagh as short-sighted man (uncredited)
- Brenda Cowling as wife (uncredited)
- Sidney Johnson as man in glasses (uncredited)
- Drina Pavlovic as courting girl (uncredited)
- Caroline Whitaker as student (uncredited)
- Ray Edwards as man with water (uncredited)

== Filming and locations ==
- Filming dates: 10 March – 18 April 1975

Interiors:

- Pinewood Studios, Buckinghamshire

Exteriors:

- Pinewood Studios: the Orchard doubled for the caravan site, as it had for the campsite in Carry On Camping.
- Maidenhead, Berkshire: the town hall doubled for the university seen at the start of the film. It had previously been used for the hospital exteriors in Carry On Doctor and Carry On Again Doctor.
- Farnham Common, Buckinghamshire

== Bibliography ==
- Bright, Morris; Ross, Robert (2000). Mr Carry On – The Life & Work of Peter Rogers. London: BBC Books. ISBN 978-0-563-55183-6.
- Davidson, Andy (2012). Carry On Confidential. London: Miwk. ISBN 978-1-908630-01-8.
- Eastaugh, Kenneth (1978). The Carry On Book. London: David & Charles. ISBN 978-0-7153-7403-0.
- Hibbin, Sally; Hibbin, Nina (1988). What a Carry On. London: Hamlyn. ISBN 978-0-600-55819-4.
- Hudis, Norman (2008). No Laughing Matter. London: Apex. ISBN 978-1-906358-15-0.
- Rigelsford, Adrian (1996). Carry On Laughing – a celebration. London: Virgin. ISBN 1-85227-554-5.
- Ross, Robert (2002). The Carry On Companion. London: Batsford. ISBN 978-0-7134-8771-8.
- Sheridan, Simon (2007). Keeping the British End Up: Four Decades of Saucy Cinema (third ed.). Reynolds & Hearn Books.
- Sheridan, Simon (2011). Keeping the British End Up – Four Decades of Saucy Cinema. London: Titan Books. ISBN 978-0-85768-279-6.
- Webber, Richard (2009). 50 Years of Carry On. London: Arrow. ISBN 978-0-09-949007-4.
