= Carry On England =

1976 British comedy film by Gerald Thomas

- Original UK quad poster
- Directed by: Gerald Thomas
- Written by: David Pursall; Jack Seddon
- Produced by: Peter Rogers
- Starring: Kenneth Connor; Windsor Davies; Patrick Mower; Judy Geeson; Jack Douglas; Joan Sims; Peter Butterworth; Melvyn Hayes; Peter Jones
- Cinematography: Ernest Steward
- Edited by: Richard Marden
- Music by: Max Harris
- Production company: Rank Organisation
- Distributed by: Rank Film Distributors
- Release date: 31 October 1976
- Running time: 89 minutes
- Country: United Kingdom
- Language: English
- Budget: £250,000

Carry On England is a 1976 British comedy film, the 28th release in the series of the original 30 Carry On films (1958–1978). It was released in October 1976 and featured Carry On regulars Kenneth Connor, Jack Douglas, Joan Sims and Peter Butterworth. It was the second and last Carry On film for Windsor Davies, Diane Langton and Peter Jones, as well as the fifth and last for Patricia Franklin and the eighth and last for Julian Holloway. Patrick Mower, Judy Geeson and Melvyn Hayes make their only appearances in a Carry On film. The film was followed by That's Carry On! in 1977.

== Plot ==
During the darkest days of the war Captain S Melly is put in charge of the experimental 1313 Anti-Aircraft Battery along with the bellowing, ball-squeezing Sergeant Major “Tiger” Bloomer. Melly soon discovers the “experiment” is that half his men are women, led by the randy Bombardier Ready, Sergeant Tilly Willing and Sergeant Len Able. Tiger is unable to discipline properly as he is unable to swear around women and must avoid the libidinous advances of Private Ffoukes-Sharpe. Meanwhile, the battery are happy to spend the war in each other's beds.

Melly shakes things up with a fake air raid and is furious when instead of loading the gun they dive for cover in their private bunker, the “Snoggery”. Even worse the anti-aircraft cannon is made of wood; with a war on, real guns are hard to come by.

Determined to get the battery up to standard Melly and Tiger put the men, and women, through vigorous retraining, violent exercise and 12 mile long route marches. In response Ready, Willing and Able sabotage Melly's uniform, leaving him red faced and bare cheeked. The whole battery is confined to camp as punishment, Melly not realising that men and women in close quarters don't need to leave camp to enjoy themselves. Realising his mistake Melly endeavours to separate man from woman with barbed wire around the sleeping quarters, round the clock battle drills and separate mealtimes.

Determined to reunite with their beloveds, the battery digs secret tunnels under the barbed wire for easy access, making life bearable again. Unfortunately the very next day Melly finally takes delivery of an anti-aircraft cannon, which promptly falls into the tunnel. Forced by Melly to retrieve the gun from its hole the battery sabotages an inspection by Melly's Brigadier, hoping Melly will be reassigned somewhere else.

When a real air raid arrives both battery and officers pull together to defend England, successfully shooting down all enemy planes and with only one casualty: Captain Melly's two sprained fingers, which go on to inspire one of the most famous symbols of victory for the entire war.

== Production ==
This film featured few established members of the Carry On team. Kenneth Connor and Jack Douglas played leading roles, but Joan Sims and Peter Butterworth had only small supporting roles. The roles of the Brigadier and Private Easy were written with Kenneth Williams and Barbara Windsor in mind, but both were unavailable due to previous theatre commitments. Sid James was similarly unavailable due to appearing in The Mating Season; on the opening night of the play at Sunderland Empire Theatre, James suffered a heart attack on stage and died.

Windsor Davies, who had joined the series with a main role in the preceding film Carry On Behind, again plays a major role, reprising (in all but name) his Sergeant-Major character from the BBC sitcom It Ain't Half Hot Mum, along with Melvyn Hayes as his effeminate foil. Other main roles are played by established and recognisable actors Judy Geeson and Patrick Mower, both newcomers to the Carry On films.

In 2023, actor Larry Dann dedicated a chapter of his autobiography Oh, What A Lovely Memoir to share his memories of the making of this production.

The film was originally certified AA by the British Board of Film Censors which would have restricted audiences to those aged fourteen and over, but was cut down to the non-age limited A certificate by heavily toning down the scenes featuring topless nudity and removing one comedic use of the word fokker. However, it still proved to be a major commercial failure and was withdrawn from some cinemas after just three days.

== Cast ==
- Kenneth Connor as Captain S Melly
- Windsor Davies as Sergeant Major "Tiger" Bloomer
- Patrick Mower as Sergeant Len Able
- Judy Geeson as Sergeant Tilly Willing
- Jack Douglas as Bombardier Ready
- Peter Jones as Brigadier
- Diane Langton as Private Alice Easy
- Melvyn Hayes as Gunner Shorthouse
- Peter Butterworth as Major Carstairs
- Joan Sims as Private Jennifer Ffoukes-Sharpe
- Julian Holloway as Major Butcher
- David Lodge as Captain Bull
- Larry Dann as Gunner Shaw
- Brian Osborne as Gunner Owen
- Johnny Briggs as Melly's driver
- Patricia Franklin as Corporal Cook
- Linda Hooks as Nurse
- John Carlin as Officer
- Vivienne Johnson as Freda
- Michael Nightingale as Officer
- Jeremy Connor as Gunner Hiscocks
- Richard Olley as Gunner Parker
- Peter Banks as Gunner Thomas
- Richard Bartlett as Gunner Drury
- Billy J. Mitchell as Gunner Childs
- Peter Quince as Gunner Sharpe
- Paul Toothill as Gunner Gale
- Tricia Newby as Bombardier/Corporal Murray
- Louise Burton as Private Evans
- Jeannie Collings as Private Edwards
- Barbara Hampshire as Private Carter
- Linda Regan as Private Taylor
- Barbara Rosenblat as ATS girl

== Crew ==
- Screenplay – David Pursall & Jack Seddon
- Music – Max Harris
- Production Manager – Roy Goddard
- Art Director – Lionel Couch
- Editor – Richard Marden
- Director of Photography – Ernest Steward
- Camera Operator – Geoffrey Godar
- Wardrobe – Vi Murray & Don Mothersill
- Casting Director – John Owen
- Stills Cameraman – Ken Bray
- Make-up – Geoffrey Rodway
- Sound Recordists – Danny Daniel & Gordon McCallum
- Continuity – Marjorie Lavelly
- Hairdresser – Stella Rivers
- Costume Design – Courtenay Elliott
- Set Dresser – Donald Picton
- Dubbing Editor – Pat Foster
- Assistant Editor – Jack Gardner
- Assistant Director – Jack Causey
- Titles – GSE Ltd
- Processor – Rank Film Laboratories
- Gun – Imperial War Museum
- Producer – Peter Rogers
- Director – Gerald Thomas

== Filming and locations ==
- Filming dates – 3 May–4 June 1976

Interiors:

- Pinewood Studios, Buckinghamshire

Exteriors:

- Pinewood Studios. The orchard was utilised once again as it was for the camping and caravan sites in Carry On Camping and Carry On Behind.
- Black Park, Iver Heath, Buckinghamshire

== Reception ==
In a 2018 retrospective on the series, the British Film Institute named Carry On England as one of the series' five worst films, alongside Carry On Girls (1973), That's Carry On! (1977), Carry On Emmannuelle (1978), and Carry On Columbus (1992).

== Bibliography ==
- Bright, Morris; Ross, Robert (2000). Mr Carry On – The Life & Work of Peter Rogers. London: BBC Books. ISBN 978-0-563-55183-6.
- Davidson, Andy (2012). Carry On Confidential. London: Miwk. ISBN 978-1-908630-01-8.
- Eastaugh, Kenneth (1978). The Carry On Book. London: David & Charles. ISBN 978-0-7153-7403-0.
- Hibbin, Sally & Nina (1988). What a Carry On. London: Hamlyn. ISBN 978-0-600-55819-4.
- Hudis, Norman (2008). No Laughing Matter. London: Apex. ISBN 978-1-906358-15-0.
- Rigelsford, Adrian (1996). Carry On Laughing – a celebration. London: Virgin. ISBN 1-85227-554-5.
- Ross, Robert (2002). The Carry On Companion. London: Batsford. ISBN 978-0-7134-8771-8.
- Sheridan, Simon, Keeping the British End Up: Four Decades of Saucy Cinema (third edition, 2007; Reynolds & Hearn Books)
- Sheridan, Simon (2011). Keeping the British End Up – Four Decades of Saucy Cinema. London: Titan Books. ISBN 978-0-85768-279-6.
- Webber, Richard (2009). 50 Years of Carry On. London: Arrow. ISBN 978-0-09-949007-4.
