= Tony Imi =

British cinematographer (1937–2010)

- Born: 27 March 1937; London, England
- Died: 8 March 2010 (aged 72)
- Occupation: cinematographer
- Years active: 1965–2006
- Military career
- Allegiance: United Kingdom
- Branch: Royal Air Force
- Service years: 1955–1957
- Rank: Senior aircraftsman

Tony Imi BSC (27 March 1937 – 8 March 2010) was a British motion picture and television cinematographer. He was born in London, England.

== Filmography ==
- Up the Junction (1965)
- Cathy Come Home (1966)
- Inadmissible Evidence (1968)
- Universal Soldier (1971)
- The Raging Moon (1971)
- Elephant Boy (1973) TV Series
- Edward the King (1975) (mini) TV Series
- The Firefighters (1975)
- The Likely Lads (1976)
- The Slipper and the Rose (1976)
- Robin Hood Junior (1977)
- That's Carry On! (1977)
- International Velvet (1978)
- North Sea Hijack (1979)
- The Sea Wolves (1980)
- A Tale of Two Cities (1980) (TV)
- Night Crossing (1981) (director of photography)
- Goodbye Charlie Bright(2001)
- The Life and Adventures of Nicholas Nickleby (1982) (mini) TV Series
- The Third Reich (1982) (TV)
- My Body, My Child (1982) (TV)
- Savage Islands (1983)
- A Christmas Carol (1984) (TV)
- Enemy Mine (1985)
- Reunion at Fairborough (1985)
- Oceans of Fire (1986) (TV)
- Empire State (1987)
- The Return of Sherlock Holmes (1987) (TV)
- Buster (1988)
- Babycakes (1989) (TV)
- Wired (1989)
- The Old Man and the Sea (1990) (TV)
- Fire Birds (1990)
- Coins in the Fountain (1990) (TV)
- Child of Rage (1992) (TV)
- Scarlett (1994) (mini) TV series
- Shopping (1994)
- The Sunshine Boys (1996) (TV)
- Aimée & Jaguar (1999)
- Silent Cry (2002)
- Chaos and Cadavers (2003)
- Lighthouse Hill (2004)
- Survival Island (2005)
- The Shell Seekers (2006) (TV)
- Candles on Bay Street (2006) (TV)
- Victims (2006)
