= Judith Furse =

English actress (1912–1974)

- Born: 4 March 1912; Camberley, Surrey, England, UK
- Died: 29 August 1974 (aged 62); Canterbury, Kent, England, UK
- Occupation: Actress
- Years active: 1938–1972
- Parent(s): Jean Adelaide Furse; William Furse

Judith Furse (4 March 1912 – 29 August 1974) was an English actress.

== Career ==
She was a member of the Furse family; her father was Lieutenant-General Sir William Furse and mother Jean Adelaide Furse. Her brother, Roger, became a stage designer and painter who also worked in films.

She was educated at St Paul's Girls' School and studied theatre at the Old Vic in the early 1930s. By the end of that decade, she became a stage actress. One of Judith Furse's earliest film roles was as Sister Briony in Black Narcissus (1947). She was known for her heavy-set, somewhat masculine looks, and was often cast as overbearing types such as the villainous Doctor Crow in Carry On Spying (1964).

Other films included The Man in the White Suit (1951), Mother Riley Meets the Vampire (1952), Blue Murder at St Trinian's (1957), Carry On Regardless (1961), Live Now – Pay Later (1962) and Carry On Cabby (1963). One of her more sympathetic roles was as Flora, Greer Garson's concerned travelling companion, in the original Goodbye, Mr Chips (1939). She made her last film appearance, as a drag king, in the Australian film The Adventures of Barry McKenzie (1972).

In 1958, she, Roger Livesey, Terry-Thomas, Rita Webb, Avril Angers, and Miles Malleson, recorded 'Indian Summer of an Uncle', and 'Jeeves Takes Charge' for the Caedmon Audio record label, (Caedmon Audio TC-1137). She played Aunt Agatha. It was released in stereo in 1964.

== Partial filmography ==
- Goodbye, Mr Chips (1939) – Flora
- A Canterbury Tale (1944) – Dorothy Bird
- English Without Tears (1944) – Elise Batter-Jones
- Johnny Frenchman (1945) – Jane Matthews
- Quiet Weekend (1946) – Ella Spender
- While the Sun Shines (1947) – Female Receptionist
- Black Narcissus (1947) – Sister Briony
- One Night with You (1948) – Second Writer
- Bond Street (1948) – Miss Lane (uncredited)
- It's Hard to Be Good (1948) – Sister Taylor (uncredited)
- Marry Me! (1949) – Statuesque Woman (uncredited)
- Helter Skelter (1949) – Mrs. Martin
- Dear Mr. Prohack (1949) – Laura Postern
- The Romantic Age (1949) – Miss Adams
- The Browning Version (1951) – Mrs. Williamson
- The Man in the White Suit (1951) – Nurse Gamage
- I Believe in You (1952) – Policewoman Jones (uncredited)
- Mother Riley Meets the Vampire (1952) – Freda
- The Heart of the Matter (1953) – Dr.Sykes (uncredited)
- A Day to Remember (1953) – Lady in Charge of Party (uncredited)
- Mad About Men (1954) – Viola
- The Cockleshell Heroes (1955) – W.V.S. Woman
- Doctor at Large (1957) – Mrs. Digby – Innkeeper
- Blue Murder at St Trinian's (1957) – Dame Maud Hackshaw
- Further Up the Creek (1958) – Chief Wren
- Serious Charge (1959) – Probation Officer
- Scent of Mystery (1960) – Miss Leonard
- Sands of the Desert (1960) – Yasmin
- Not a Hope in Hell (1960) – Miss Appleton
- Carry On Regardless (1961) – Girl Guide Leader
- A Weekend with Lulu (1961) – Mme. Bon-Bon
- Postman's Knock (1962) – Station Mistress (uncredited)
- In the Doghouse (1962) – Massage Woman
- I Thank a Fool (1962) – Warden
- Live Now – Pay Later (1962) – Mrs. Ackroyd
- The Iron Maiden (1962) – Mrs. Webb
- Carry On Cabby (1963) – Battleaxe Rider
- A Jolly Bad Fellow (1964) – Lady Davidson
- Carry On Spying (1964) – Doctor Crow
- The Amorous Adventures of Moll Flanders (1965) – Miss Glowber
- Sky West and Crooked (1965) – Mrs. Rigby
- The Dirty Dozen (1967) – Drunken General's Wife (uncredited)
- Sinful Davey (1969) – Mary
- Twinky (1970) – School Miss-tress
- Man in the Wilderness (1971) – Nurse
- The Adventures of Barry McKenzie (1972) – Claude (final film role)
