= Michael Nightingale =

British actor (1922–1999)

- in The Avengers episode A Funny Thing Happened on the Way to the Station (1967)
- Born: Alfred George Cyril Michael Nightingale; 6 October 1922; Brighton, Sussex, England
- Died: 8 May 1999 (aged 76); Wormshill, Kent, England
- Years active: 1948–1994
- Spouse: Violet J Coleman (1956 - ?)
- Children: one

Alfred George Cyril Michael Nightingale (6 October 1922 – 8 May 1999) was an English stage, film and television actor. He appeared in 13 (9 credited and 4 uncredited) of the Carry On film series – the tenth highest number of appearances.

== Selected filmography ==
- The Man Who Watched Trains Go By (1952) - Popinga's Clerk
- Noose for a Lady (1953) - The Barrister
- Is Your Honeymoon Really Necessary? (1953) - Policeman
- Man in the Shadow (1957) - B.E.A. Official (uncredited)
- Ice Cold in Alex (1958) - C.M.P. Captain - Check Point
- The Stranglers of Bombay (1959) - Sidney Flood (uncredited)
- The Young Jacobites (1960) - Colonel
- Watch Your Stern (1960) - Sailor
- The Silent Weapon (1961) - Inspector Hammond
- Carry On Regardless (1961) - Wine Bystander (uncredited)
- Raising the Wind (1961) - Invigilator
- The Iron Maiden (1962) - Senior Rally Steward
- Carry On Cabby (1963) - Businessman
- Carry On Jack (1963) - Town Crier
- Carry On Cleo (1964) - Ancient Briton
- Curse of the Voodoo (1965) - Hunter #2
- Sky West and Crooked (1965) - Doctor
- Carry On Cowboy (1965) - Bank Manager
- Don't Lose Your Head (1966) - 'What locket?' Man (uncredited)
- Follow That Camel (1967) - Nightingale the Butler (uncredited)
- Decline and Fall... of a Birdwatcher (1968) - Colonel Clutterbuck
- Journey to Midnight (1968) - Butler (episode 'Poor Butterfly')
- Night After Night After Night (1969) - Martingale, solicitor
- Carry On Camping (1969) - Man in cinema
- Clegg (1970) - Col. Sullivan
- Tora! Tora! Tora! (1970) - (uncredited)
- The Raging Moon (1971) - Mr. Thomas
- Carry On Matron (1972) - Pearson
- Mutiny on the Buses (1972) - Pilot
- Bless This House (1972) - Vicar
- Carry On Girls (1973) - City Gent on Tube (uncredited)
- Carry On Dick (1974) - Squire Trelawney
- The Internecine Project (1974) - Businessman #1
- The Return of the Pink Panther (1975) - Museum Tourist
- Carry On England (1976) - Officer
- Carry On Emmannuelle (1978) - Police Commissioner
- Dominique (1978) - Vicar at Funeral
