= Eric Rogers (composer) =

English composer, conductor, arranger (1921–1981)

- Also known as: Eric Gauk-Roger
- Born: Eric Gaukroger; 25 September 1921; Halifax, Yorkshire, England
- Died: 8 April 1981 (aged 59) Chalfont St Peter, Buckinghamshire, England
- Occupations: Composer; conductor; arranger

Eric Rogers (born Eric Gaukroger; 25 September 1921 – 8 April 1981) was an English-born composer, conductor and arranger, best known for composing the scores for twenty-two Carry On films.

== Early life ==
Rogers moved with his parents from Halifax, England, to Morriston, Wales, when he was three. He was interested in music from an early age and was taught to play the church organ. His musical apprenticeship was generally untutored and he found himself playing the piano during World War II for free beer.

== Career ==
In the aftermath of World War II, he set up his own orchestra, playing in the Orchid Room at the London Trocadero. He orchestrated the original stage production of Oliver!, first performed at the New Theatre, West End, London, on 30 June 1960.

As his reputation grew, he was offered many conducting jobs for films. Most notably, he composed the music for 22 Carry On films. He also conducted the music for the first James Bond film Dr. No credited as Eric Rodgers. His uncredited work for the Carry On films began with "Carry On Teacher", arranging the main title theme. This was used for the next two films in the series. He would later go on to compose many film scores himself, starting with Carry On Cabby in 1963, as well as other Rogers/Thomas films "Nurse On Wheels", "The Big Job" and "Bless This House". His final Carry On score was for Carry On Emmannuelle in 1978.

Rogers emigrated to America in 1975, after working intermittently in the UK and America from 1970, and became in demand for composing various film and TV series. By this point he had struck up an alliance with DePatie and Freleng productions, who were at the time making a number of animated series for children, such as Return to the Planet of the Apes and What's New, Mr. Magoo?. He worked for the company for four years, conducting scores for What's New, Mr. Magoo? and Pink Panther in a Pink Christmas, and providing scores for Return to the Planet of the Apes and Spider-Woman, for which he composed and conducted the theme and all the incidental music. He also conducted Dean Elliott's score for The New Fantastic Four animated series in 1978. In 1981, he conducted the music for Dennis the Menace in Mayday for Mother.

Two CDs of new recordings of Rogers' music (mainly from the Carry On films) were arranged and conducted by Gavin Sutherland, who is also custodian of all of Roger's surviving musical work.

== Personal life ==
Rogers was married to Enid Merrigan, from Swansea, with whom he had two sons.

Eric's brother, Alan Rogers, was also a musician and songwriter and has a lyric credit on the 1965 film, Carry On Cowboy.

== Death ==
He died on 8 April 1981 in Chalfont St Peter, Buckinghamshire, aged 59.

== Film and TV music ==
=== Film ===
- Meet Mr. Lucifer (1953)
- Doctor in Love (1960)
- The Iron Maiden (1962)
- Nurse on Wheels (1963)
- Carry On Cabby (1963)
- Carry On Jack (1963)
- This Is My Street (1964)
- Carry On Spying (1964)
- Carry On Cleo (1964)
- The Big Job (1965)
- Three Hats for Lisa (1965)
- Carry On Cowboy (1965)
- Carry On Screaming! (1966)
- Don't Lose Your Head (1966)
- Follow That Camel (1967)
- Carry On Doctor (1967)
- Carry On Up the Khyber (1968)
- Carry On Camping (1969)
- Carry On Again Doctor (1969)
- Doctor in Trouble (1970)
- Carry On Up the Jungle (1970)
- Carry On Loving (1970)
- Carry On Henry (1971)
- Carry On at Your Convenience (1971)
- Revenge (1971)
- Assault (1971)
- Quest for Love (1971)
- Carry On Matron (1972)
- Carry On Abroad (1972)
- Bless This House (1972)
- All Coppers Are... (1972)
- No Sex Please, We're British (1973)
- Carry On Girls (1973)
- Carry On Dick (1974)
- Carry On Behind (1975)
- Carry On Emmannuelle (1978)

=== Television ===
- Sunday Night at the London Palladium (1950s)
- Carry On Laughing (1975)
- The Chiffy Kids (1976)
