= Carry On Girls =

1973 British comedy film by Gerald Thomas

- Original UK quad poster
- Directed by: Gerald Thomas
- Written by: Talbot Rothwell
- Produced by: Peter Rogers
- Starring: Sid James; Barbara Windsor; Joan Sims; Kenneth Connor; Bernard Bresslaw; June Whitfield; Peter Butterworth; Jack Douglas; Patsy Rowlands; Jimmy Logan; Margaret Nolan; Valerie Leon
- Cinematography: Alan Hume
- Edited by: Alfred Roome
- Music by: Eric Rogers
- Distributed by: Rank Organisation
- Release date: 9 November 1973
- Running time: 84 minutes
- Country: United Kingdom
- Language: English
- Budget: £205,962

Carry On Girls is a 1973 British comedy film, the 25th release in the series of 31 Carry On films (1958–1992). The film features regulars Sid James, Barbara Windsor, Joan Sims, Kenneth Connor, Bernard Bresslaw, June Whitfield and Peter Butterworth. This Carry On featured neither Kenneth Williams nor Charles Hawtrey; Williams was unavailable because of stage commitments and Hawtrey had been dropped from the series due to his alcoholism and unreliability.

Patsy Rowlands makes her seventh appearance in the series. Robin Askwith makes his only appearance in the series. Jack Douglas makes his third appearance, this time upgraded to a main role. This is the final of six Carry On films for Valerie Leon and Jimmy Logan makes the second of his two Carry On appearances. It was the second of two appearances by Sally Geeson, who also played the daughter of Sid James' character in the sitcom Bless This House.The film was followed by Carry On Dick in 1974.

== Plot ==
The seaside town of Fircombe is facing a crisis – it is always raining and there is nothing for the tourists to do. Councillor Sidney Fiddler hits on the notion of holding a beauty contest. The mayor, Frederick Bumble, is taken with the idea but feminist councillor Augusta Prodworthy is outraged and storms out of the meeting. The motion is carried in Augusta's absence, and Sidney contacts publicist Peter Potter to help with the organisation.

Sidney's girlfriend, Connie Philpotts, runs a local hotel and soon her residents—including the eccentric Mrs Dukes and the randy old Admiral – are outnumbered by putative models, including diminutive biker Hope Springs and tall, buxom Dawn Brakes. A catfight orchestrated by Hope after thinking Dawn has stolen her bikini provides better newspaper copy than bringing a donkey off the beach which, despite the bucket and spade of hotel porter, William, ruins the plush carpets. Augusta's son, press photographer Larry, is hired to document the donkey stunt and snaps the catfight that has the Mayor losing his trousers, then gulps his way through a nude photo shoot with Dawn. The Mayor's wife, Mildred, joins Prodworthy's bra-burning movement and plots the downfall of the Miss Fircombe contest on the pier. Peter Potter reluctantly cross-dresses for another publicity gimmick for the television show Women's Things, presented by Cecil Gaybody and produced by Debra. Prodworthy and butch feminist Rosemary call in the police to investigate the male pageant contestant but Peter's previously prim girlfriend, Paula, has a makeover and turns out to be very buxom and glamorous and steps into the breach as the mysterious girl.

Prodworthy's gang put "Operation Spoilsport" into action, sabotaging the final contest with water, mud and itching powder. With an angry mob after his blood, Sidney makes his escape on a go-kart, finds Connie has taken all the money and then speeds away with Hope on her motorcycle.

== Certification ==
The film marked a slightly more risqué treatment of the topic with more nudity and openly sexual jokes than previous films. Discreet cuts by the BBFC (mainly to saucy dialogue and the hotel fight sequence between bikini-clad contestants played by Barbara Windsor and Margaret Nolan) enabled the film to gain the more commercially acceptable A certificate (open to families) than the more restrictive AA certificate, barring entry to the under-fourteens.

== Cast ==
- Sid James as Sidney Fiddler
- Barbara Windsor as Hope Springs (real name Muriel Bloggs)
- Joan Sims as Connie Philpotts
- Kenneth Connor as Mayor Frederick Bumble
- Bernard Bresslaw as Peter Potter
- Peter Butterworth as Admiral
- June Whitfield as Augusta Prodworthy
- Jack Douglas as William
- Patsy Rowlands as Mildred Bumble
- Patricia Franklin as Rosemary
- Valerie Leon as Paula Perkins
- Robin Askwith as Larry
- Margaret Nolan as Dawn Brakes
- Angela Grant as Miss Bangor
- Joan Hickson as Mrs Dukes
- Sally Geeson as Debra
- Jimmy Logan as Cecil Gaybody
- Wendy Richard as Ida Downes
- David Lodge as Police Inspector
- Arnold Ridley as Alderman Pratt
- Bill Pertwee as Fire chief
- Marianne Stone as Miss Drew
- Brenda Cowling as Matron
- Zena Clifton as Susan Brooks
- Laraine Humphrys as Eileen Denby
- Pauline Peart as Gloria Winch
- Caroline Whitaker as Mary Parker
- Barbara Wise as Julia Oates
- Carol Wyler as Maureen Darcy
- Mavis Fyson as Frances Cake
- Brian Osborne as "Half a quid" citizen
- Billy Cornelius as Constable (uncredited)
- Edward Palmer as Elderly resident (uncredited)
- Michael Nightingale as City gent (uncredited)
- Hugh Futcher as "There's Fiddler" citizen (uncredited)
- Elsie Winsor as Cloakroom attendant (uncredited)
- Nick Hobbs as Stunt double (uncredited)
- Ron Tarr as Bearded man in audience (uncredited)

== Crew ==
- Screenplay – Talbot Rothwell
- Music – Eric Rogers
- Production Manager – Roy Goddard
- Art Director – Robert Jones
- Director of Photography – Alan Hume
- Editor – Alfred Roome
- Camera Operator – Jimmy Devis
- Assistant Director – Jack Causey
- Sound Recordists – Paul Lemare & Ken Barker
- Continuity – Marjorie Lavelly
- Make-up – Geoffrey Rodway
- Hairdresser – Stella Rivers
- Costume Design – Courtenay Elliott
- Set Dresser – Kenneth MacCallum Tait
- Dubbing Editor – Patrick Foster
- Assistant Editor – Jack Gardner
- Title Sketches – Larry
- Titles – GSE Ltd
- Processor – Rank Film Laboratories
- Producer – Peter Rogers
- Director – Gerald Thomas

== Production ==
=== Pre-production ===
An early version of the script featured Kenneth Williams in the role of Mayor Bumble which would ultimately be played by Kenneth Connor in the finished film. Williams was appearing in a West End play, My Fat Friend. The role of Cecil Gaybody was written for Charles Hawtrey, however he had been dropped due to his unreliability. It was then offered to Kenneth Williams, who turned it down because of stage commitments, with the part eventually going to Scottish actor Jimmy Logan.

The Rank Organisation financed four films in 1974, Carry on Dick, Carry on Girls, The Belstone Fox and Don't Just Lie There, Say Something, and partly financed Soft Beds and Hard Battles and Caravan to Vaccares.

=== Filming ===
The movie was shot from 16th April to 25th May, 1973. All the interiors were shot in Pinewood Studios, in Buckinghamshire.

The Clarges Hotel in Brighton (the exterior of which was used in the film) was then-owned by actress Dora Bryan who had appeared in the first Carry On, Carry On Sergeant. The hotel was previously used (also exterior only) in the 1971 film Carry On at Your Convenience. Another filming location these two movies have in common is Brighton's West Pier (the Palace Pier had been used a couple of years earlier in Carry On at Your Convenience). Brighton Beach was another Brighton location for this movie.

Other filming locations include the Slough Town Hall, in Slough, Berkshire; and the Marylebone railway station in London.

=== Post-production ===
Valerie Leon's voice for the film was dubbed by co-star June Whitfield.

== Reception ==
In a 2018 retrospective on the series, the British Film Institute named Carry On Girls as one of the series' five worst films, alongside Carry On England (1976), That's Carry On! (1977), Carry On Emmannuelle (1978), and Carry On Columbus (1992).

== Bibliography ==
- Davidson, Andy (2012). Carry On Confidential. London: Miwk. ISBN 978-1908630018.
- Sheridan, Simon (2011). Keeping the British End Up – Four Decades of Saucy Cinema. London: Titan Books. ISBN 978-0857682796.
- Webber, Richard (2009). 50 Years of Carry On. London: Arrow. ISBN 978-0099490074.
- Hudis, Norman (2008). No Laughing Matter. London: Apex. ISBN 978-1906358150.
- Keeping the British End Up: Four Decades of Saucy Cinema by Simon Sheridan (third edition) (2007) (Reynolds & Hearn Books)
- Ross, Robert (2002). The Carry On Companion. London: Batsford. ISBN 978-0713487718.
- Bright, Morris; Ross, Robert (2000). Mr Carry On – The Life & Work of Peter Rogers. London: BBC Books. ISBN 978-0563551836.
- Rigelsford, Adrian (1996). Carry On Laughing – a celebration. London: Virgin. ISBN 1-85227-554-5.
- Hibbin, Sally & Nina (1988). What a Carry On. London: Hamlyn. ISBN 978-0600558194.
- Eastaugh, Kenneth (1978). The Carry On Book. London: David & Charles. ISBN 978-0715374030.
