= Linda Hooks =

British model, actress, and beauty queen

- Born: 1952 (age 73–74); Liverpool, Lancashire, England
- Occupations: Actress; model; beauty queen

Linda Hooks (born 1952) is a British actress, model and beauty queen who won the Miss International 1972, three years after Valerie Susan Holmes earned the title.

She won Miss International 1972 as "Miss Britain" then competed in Miss United Kingdom 1974, failing to make the final 15. During the mid-1970s, she appeared regularly on Anglia Television as an assistant to Nicholas Parsons in the British version of the popular quiz show Sale of the Century.

As an actress, she appeared in three of the later Carry On films: Carry On Dick, Carry On Behind and Carry On England. On television, apart from several appearances in the Carry on Laughing series, she appeared in two episodes of the sci-fi drama Space: 1999 and an episode of The Sweeney.

Awards and achievements
| Preceded by (New Zealand) Jane Hansen | Miss International; 1972 | Succeeded by (Finland) Anneli Björkling |
