= That's Carry On! =

1977 British comedy film by Gerald Thomas

- DVD cover
- Directed by: Gerald Thomas
- Written by: Tony Church
- Produced by: Peter Rogers
- Starring: Kenneth Williams; Barbara Windsor
- Cinematography: Tony Imi
- Edited by: Jack Gardner
- Music by: Eric Rogers
- Distributed by: The Rank Organisation; EMI
- Release date: November 10, 1977
- Running time: 95 min.
- Country: United Kingdom
- Language: English
- Budget: £30,000

That's Carry On! is a 1977 British comedy film, the 29th release in the series of 31 Carry On films (1958–1992). The film is a compilation of the highlights of most of the previous 28 films, and features series regulars Kenneth Williams and Barbara Windsor as co-presenters. It was Windsor's 10th and final appearance in the series. The idea for the film was inspired by Metro-Goldwyn-Mayer's popular That's Entertainment! series of documentaries. It was released in 1977 as a supporting feature to the Richard Harris film, Golden Rendezvous. The film was followed by "Carry On Emmannuelle" in 1978.

== Plot ==
Kenneth Williams and Barbara Windsor are imprisoned in a Pinewood Studios projection room and trawl through film can after film can of the Carry On series. Kenneth is delighted with the slap-up food hamper and champagne, while Barbara loads the vintage clips. As the films remorselessly play out, Kenneth feels the need to relieve himself but Barbara is determined to plough through every film. Finally, scenes of speedy roadside urinating from Carry On at Your Convenience prove too much for Kenneth to bear but he holds back the flow to enjoy his finest role as the Khasi in Carry On... Up the Khyber. While Kenneth pontificates about the glories of the Empire, Barbara leaves the projection room and locks her co-star in. Unable to hold out any longer, Kenneth goes against the projection room door.

== Cast ==
- Kenneth Williams as himself
- Barbara Windsor as herself

== Crew ==
- Screenplay – Tony Church
- Archive material – Talbot Rothwell, Norman Hudis, Sid Colin & Dave Freeman
- Music – Eric Rogers
- Director of photography – Tony Imi
- Editor – Jack Gardner
- Production manager – Roy Goddard
- Dubbing editor – Christopher Lancaster
- Sound recordists – Danny Daniel & Ken Barker
- Titles – GSE Ltd
- Producer – Peter Rogers
- Director – Gerald Thomas

== Reception ==
In a 2018 retrospective on the series, the British Film Institute named That's Carry On! as one of the series' five worst films, alongside Carry On Girls (1973), Carry On England (1976), Carry On Emmannuelle (1978), and Carry On Columbus (1992).

It was the last Carry On film directly financed by Rank.

== Bibliography ==
- Davidson, Andy (2012). Carry On Confidential. London: Miwk. ISBN 978-1-908630-01-8.
- Sheridan, Simon (2011). Keeping the British End Up - Four Decades of Saucy Cinema. London: Titan Books. ISBN 978-0-85768-279-6.
- Webber, Richard (2009). 50 Years of Carry On. London: Arrow. ISBN 978-0-09-949007-4.
- Hudis, Norman (2008). No Laughing Matter. London: Apex. ISBN 978-1-906358-15-0.
- Keeping the British End Up: Four Decades of Saucy Cinema by Simon Sheridan (third edition) (2007) (Reynolds & Hearn Books)
- Ross, Robert (2002). The Carry On Companion. London: Batsford. ISBN 978-0-7134-8771-8.
- Bright, Ross, Morris, Robert (2000). Mr Carry On - The Life & Work of Peter Rogers. London: BBC Books. ISBN 978-0-563-55183-6.
- Rigelsford, Adrian (1996). Carry On Laughing - a celebration. London: Virgin. ISBN 1-85227-554-5.
- Hibbin, Sally & Nina (1988). What a Carry On. London: Hamlyn. ISBN 978-0-600-55819-4.
- Eastaugh, Kenneth (1978). The Carry On Book. London: David & Charles. ISBN 978-0-7153-7403-0.
