= Carry On Camping =

1969 British comedy film by Gerald Thomas

- Original UK quad poster by Renato Fratini
- Directed by: Gerald Thomas
- Written by: Talbot Rothwell
- Produced by: Peter Rogers
- Starring: Sid James; Kenneth Williams; Charles Hawtrey; Joan Sims; Terry Scott; Hattie Jacques; Barbara Windsor; Bernard Bresslaw; Peter Butterworth
- Cinematography: Ernest Steward
- Edited by: Alfred Roome
- Music by: Eric Rogers
- Distributed by: The Rank Organisation
- Release date: 29 May 1969
- Running time: 88 minutes
- Country: United Kingdom
- Language: English
- Budget: £208,354

Carry On Camping is a 1969 British comedy film, the 17th release in the series of 31 Carry On films (1958–1992). It features series regulars Sid James, Kenneth Williams, Charles Hawtrey, Joan Sims, Terry Scott, Hattie Jacques, Barbara Windsor, Bernard Bresslaw, Dilys Laye and Peter Butterworth. The film was followed by Carry On Again Doctor in December 1969.

== Plot ==
Sid Boggle and his friend Bernie Lugg are partners in a plumbing business. They take their girlfriends, prudish Joan Fussey and meek Anthea Meeks, to the cinema to see a film about a nudist camp called Paradise. Sid has the idea of the four of them holidaying there, reasoning that in that environment their chaste girlfriends will relax their strict moral standards. Despite having reservations, Bernie agrees to co-operate with Sid in the scheme, which they attempt to keep secret from the girls.

They travel to a campsite named Paradise. After paying the membership fees to the owner, money-grabbing farmer Josh Fiddler, Sid realises it is not the camp seen in the film, but merely a standard family campsite. To add to their disappointment, it is no paradise but instead a damp field; the only facilities being a very basic toilet and a washing block. They reluctantly agree to stay there after the girls approve of the place and Fiddler refuses a refund. There is further disappointment when the girls will not share a tent with the boys.

Meanwhile, a group of young ladies on holiday from the Chayste Place finishing school stay overnight at Ballsworth Youth Hostel. The ringleader of the girls is blonde and bouncy Babs. In charge of the girls is Dr. Soaper, who is fervently pursued by his lovelorn colleague, the school's matron, Miss Haggard. Babs and her friend Fanny change the room numbers on Dr. Soaper's and Miss Haggard's doors and convince Dr. Soaper that the female washroom, where Miss Haggard is, is the male washroom. The room number changes also causes Dr. Soaper to mistake Miss Haggard’s room for his and to Miss Haggard’s horror get into bed beside her. The party arrives at the campsite the next day, where Sid and Bernie are only too happy to assist the girls in setting up their tents. The following morning, Dr Soaper leads an outdoor aerobics session, during which Babs' bikini top flies off; he catches it.

Other campers are Peter Potter, who loathes camping but must endure his jolly yet domineering wife Harriet, with her irritating laugh, whose overnight camping en-route to Paradise campsite is interrupted by naïve first-time camper Charlie Muggins. They manage to sneak away from him the following morning and arrive at the campsite, only to discover him already there.

Chaos ensues when a group of hippies shows up and take over the neighbouring field for a noisy all-night rave led by the band "The Flowerbuds". The campers club together and successfully drive the partygoers away, but all the girls leave with them. However, there is a happy ending for Bernie and Sid when their girlfriends finally agree to move into their tent. Their joy is short-lived when Joan's mother turns up, but Anthea lets loose a goat that chases Mrs Fussey away. Meanwhile, Peter vows to Harriet that this camping holiday will most definitely be their last.

== Cast ==
- Sid James as Sid Boggle
- Kenneth Williams as Doctor Kenneth Soaper
- Joan Sims as Joan Fussey
- Charles Hawtrey as Charlie Muggins
- Terry Scott as Peter Potter
- Barbara Windsor as Babs
- Bernard Bresslaw as Bernie Lugg
- Hattie Jacques as Miss Haggard/Matron
- Peter Butterworth as Joshua Fiddler
- Julian Holloway as Jim Tanner
- Dilys Laye as Anthea Meeks
- Betty Marsden as Harriet Potter
- Sandra Caron as Fanny
- Trisha Noble as Sally
- Amelia Bayntun as Mrs Fussey
- Brian Oulton as Mr Short, the camping store manager
- Patricia Franklin as Farmer's daughter
- Derek Francis as Farmer
- Michael Nightingale as Man in cinema
- George Moon as Man at campsite
- Walter Henry as Man in cinema
- Valerie Shute as Pat
- Elizabeth Knight as Jane
- Georgina Moon as Joy
- Vivien Lloyd as Verna
- Jennifer Pyle as Hilda
- Lesley Duff as Norma
- Jackie Pool as Betty
- Anna Karen as Hefty girl
- Sally Kemp as Girl with cow
- Valerie Leon as Miss Dobbin, the camping store assistant
- Angela Grant as Schoolgirl (uncredited)
- Peter Cockburn as Film Commentator (uncredited)
- Gilly Grant as Sally G-string (uncredited)
- Michael Low as Lusty youth (uncredited)
- Mike Lucas as Lusty youth (uncredited)
- Alf Mangan as Camper (uncredited)
- David Seaforth as Camper (uncredited)

== Filming and locations ==
- Filming dates – 7 October–22 November 1968

Interiors:

- Pinewood Studios, Buckinghamshire

Exteriors:

- Pinewood Studios, Buckinghamshire. The studios' orchard doubled for Paradise Camp. Chayste Place school is the management block at Pinewood Studios, better known as Heatherden Hall and featured in Carry On Nurse, Carry On Up the Khyber, Carry On Again Doctor, Carry On at Your Convenience, Carry On Behind and Carry On England.
- Pinewood Green, Iver Heath housing estate, Buckinghamshire
- Everyman Cinema, Gerrards Cross, Buckinghamshire
- Maidenhead High Street
- Black Park, Buckinghamshire

== Reception ==
The film was the most popular movie at the UK box office in 1969. It was voted the nation's favourite Carry On film in a survey conducted by the Daily Mirror in 2008.

In a 2018 retrospective on the series, the British Film Institute named Carry On Camping as one of the series' five best films, alongside Carry On Cleo (1964), Carry On Screaming! (1966), Carry On Up the Khyber (1968), and Carry On Matron (1972).
