= Carry On Spying =

1964 British comedy film by Gerald Thomas

- Original UK quad poster by Tom Chantrell
- Directed by: Gerald Thomas
- Written by: Talbot Rothwell; Sid Colin
- Produced by: Peter Rogers
- Starring: Kenneth Williams; Barbara Windsor; Bernard Cribbins; Charles Hawtrey; Eric Barker; Dilys Laye
- Cinematography: Alan Hume
- Edited by: Archie Ludski
- Music by: Eric Rogers
- Production companies: Anglo-Amalgamated; Peter Rogers Productions
- Distributed by: Warner-Pathé Distributors
- Release date: 29 July 1964
- Running time: 87 minutes
- Country: United Kingdom
- Language: English
- Budget: £148,000

Carry On Spying is a 1964 British spy comedy film directed by Gerald Thomas. It is the ninth in the series of 31 Carry On films (1958–1992).

It marks Barbara Windsor's first appearance in the series. Series regulars Kenneth Williams, Charles Hawtrey, and Jim Dale are present. Bernard Cribbins makes the second of his three Carry On appearances (although it would be 28 years before he returned in Carry On Columbus). Eric Barker appears for his third entry (his final appearance would be in Carry On Emmannuelle 14 years later). Dilys Laye returns after her series debut in Carry On Cruising. This is the last film of the series to be shot in black and white. The following film was Carry On Cleo later in 1964.

== Plot ==
A top-secret chemical formula has been stolen by STENCH (the Society for the Total Extinction of Non-Conforming Humans). Hoping against hope to retrieve the formula from enemy hands, the chief of the Secret Service reluctantly sends the only agent he has left, the bumbling and silly Agent Desmond Simpkins and his three trainees – Agent Harold Crump, Agent Daphne Honeybutt, and Agent Charlie Bind – to achieve this goal.

The agents travel separately to Vienna, where each makes contact with Carstairs, who assumes a different disguise for each rendezvous. Next, they meet at the Cafe Mozart and later travel on to Algiers. Along the way, they encounter STENCH agents the Fat Man and Milchmann (who stole the formula whilst disguised – befitting the English translation of his German name – as a milkman). Unfortunately, the agents' ineptitude results in Carstairs being floored in an encounter with the Fat Man.

Daphne and Harold attempt to steal the formula back whilst disguised as dancing girls in Hakim's Fun House, where the Fat Man is relaxing. The agents also encounter the mysterious Lila, whom they are uncertain whether or not to trust. With the STENCH henchmen close on their heels, the agents have no choice but to have Daphne memorise the formula with her photographic memory, before the four of them destroy the formula papers by eating them with soup and bread.

The four end up captives of STENCH. Daphne is interrogated by the evil Dr Crow, head of STENCH, but she fails to succumb until she accidentally bumps her head, causing her to reveal the formula. Simpkins, Crump, and Bind manage to escape their cell and collect Daphne and Dr. Crow's tape recording of Daphne's recitation, but are caught up in an underground automated factory process, from which they escape only when Lila pulls a gun on Dr Crow, forcing her to reverse the process.

Simpkins sets the STENCH base to self-destruct before rushing into a lift with the other agents, as well as with Lila and Dr Crow. As the lift ascends, Lila reveals to Simpkins that she is a double agent working for SNOG (the Society for the Neutralising of Germs) and that she has a crush on him. The lift reaches the surface, which is revealed to be the office of the chief of the Secret Service; the headquarters of STENCH is right below the streets of London. Simpkins suddenly realises what he has done just before STENCH headquarters self-destructs, choking the chief's office in a thick cloud of smoke.

== Cast ==
- Kenneth Williams as Desmond Simpkins (codename Red Admiral)
- Barbara Windsor as Daphne Honeybutt (codename Brown Cow)
- Charles Hawtrey as Charlie Bind (codename Yellow Peril)
- Bernard Cribbins as Harold Crump (codename Bluebottle)
- Jim Dale as Carstairs
- Eric Barker as The Chief
- Richard Wattis as Cobley
- Dilys Laye as Lila
- Eric Pohlmann as The Fat Man
- Victor Maddern as Milchmann
- Judith Furse as Dr. Crow (voiced by John Bluthal)

== Crew ==
- Screenplay – Talbot Rothwell and Sid Colin
- Music – Eric Rogers
- Songs – "Too Late" by Alex Alstone and Geoffrey Parsons and "The Magic of Love" by Eric Rogers
- Associate Producer – Frank Bevis
- Art Director – Alex Vetchinsky
- Director of Photography – Alan Hume
- Editor – Archie Ludski
- Camera Operator – Godfrey Godar
- Assistant Director – Peter Bolton
- Unit Manager – Donald Toms
- Continuity – Penny Daniels
- Hairdressing – Biddy Chrystal
- Sound Editor – Christopher Lancaster
- Sound Recordists – CC Stevens and Bill Daniels
- Costume Designer – Yvonne Caffin
- Make-up – WT Partleton
- Producer – Peter Rogers
- Director – Gerald Thomas

== Production ==
Albert R. Broccoli, the producer of the James Bond film series, objected to the character name "James Bind agent 006½" (intended for Charles Hawtrey) and threatened legal action. Hence, producer Peter Rogers changed the name to Charlie and the agent's code number to double 0 – ohh! Poster artist Tom Chantrell also had to modify the film poster when similar complaints were voiced that the artwork was too similar to Renato Fratini's From Russia with Love poster.

The film pokes fun at various spy films, the James Bond series being the least of them. They include The Third Man (Eric Pohlmann, who plays The Fat Man, had a minor part in The Third Man and was the voice of SPECTRE No 1 in From Russia with Love). One or two of Crow's female assistants wear hairstyles similar to those of Modesty Blaise, whose adventures had started in the London Evening Standard the previous year.

=== Filming and locations ===
Filming dates were 8 February–13 March 1964, with interiors shot at Pinewood Studios, Buckinghamshire. Footage from Things to Come was incorporated into the film to depict the interior of STENCH's underground base.

== Critical reception ==
Carry On Spying received critical acclaim, with critics praising its fast pace, satirical intent, and Kenneth Williams' performance which was largely based on his "Snide" persona from Hancock's Half Hour. On Rotten Tomatoes it has an approval rating of 83% based on 6 reviews.

Kinematograph Weekly called the film a "money maker" for 1964.

The Monthly Film Bulletin wrote: "Straight off the Carry On assembly line, this spoof on James Bondery looses a few random and very limp satirical shafts, but is for the most part content to stick to routine: in other words, a few bright gags are buried in a waste of coy camp, female impersonation and mildly smutty jokes. Bernard Cribbins manages to be quite funny, especially when disguised as an Oriental harridan in an Algiers bordello ... twanging desultorily at a stringed instrument and emitting a piercing parody of Eastern song in quarter-tone style; as a newcomer to the team, Barbara Windsor is decidedly an asset; and Dilys Laye is charming as Lila.”

The Radio Times Guide to Films gave the film 3/5 stars, writing: "Spy spoof mercilessly ribbing the Bond movies and Graham Greene's espionage entertainments, the ninth Carry On saw Barbara Windsor make her series debut as the most resourceful of a hamstrung quartet of agents sent to Vienna to recover a secret formula. The Casbah scenes rather slow things down, but the action picks up pace in STENCH's underground HQ (a wonderfully observed 007 send-up). Bernard Cribbins, Charles Hawtrey and Kenneth Williams are on form as Babs's weak-kneed accomplices and there are splendid turns from Jim Dale and Eric Barker."

== Bibliography ==
- Davidson, Andy (2012). Carry On Confidential. London: Miwk. ISBN 978-1908630018.
- Sheridan, Simon (2011). Keeping the British End Up – Four Decades of Saucy Cinema. London: Titan Books. ISBN 978-0857682796.
- Webber, Richard (2009). 50 Years of Carry On. London: Arrow. ISBN 978-0099490074.
- Hudis, Norman (2008). No Laughing Matter. London: Apex. ISBN 978-1906358150.
- Keeping the British End Up: Four Decades of Saucy Cinema by Simon Sheridan (third edition) (2007) (Reynolds & Hearn Books)
- Ross, Robert (2002). The Carry On Companion. London: Batsford. ISBN 978-0713487718.
- Bright, Morris; Ross, Robert (2000). Mr Carry On – The Life & Work of Peter Rogers. London: BBC Books. ISBN 978-0563551836.
- Rigelsford, Adrian (1996). Carry On Laughing – a celebration. London: Virgin. ISBN 1-85227-554-5.
- Hibbin, Sally & Nina (1988). What a Carry On. London: Hamlyn. ISBN 978-0600558194.
- Eastaugh, Kenneth (1978). The Carry On Book. London: David & Charles. ISBN 978-0715374030.
