= Carry On Screaming! =

1966 British comedy film by Gerald Thomas

- Original UK quad poster
- Directed by: Gerald Thomas
- Written by: Talbot Rothwell
- Produced by: Peter Rogers
- Starring: Harry H. Corbett; Kenneth Williams; Jim Dale; Charles Hawtrey; Fenella Fielding; Joan Sims; Angela Douglas
- Cinematography: Alan Hume
- Edited by: Rod Keys
- Music by: Eric Rogers
- Production companies: Anglo-Amalgamated; Peter Rogers Productions
- Distributed by: Warner-Pathé Distributors
- Release date: 16 August 1966
- Running time: 97 minutes
- Country: United Kingdom
- Language: English
- Budget: £197,500

Carry On Screaming! is a 1966 British comedy horror film, the twelfth in the series of 31 Carry On films (1958–1992). It was the last Carry On to be made by Anglo-Amalgamated before the series moved to The Rank Organisation. Of the regular cast, it features Kenneth Williams, Jim Dale, Charles Hawtrey, Joan Sims, Bernard Bresslaw and Peter Butterworth. It also features Harry H. Corbett in his only series appearance and Fenella Fielding making her second and final appearance. Angela Douglas makes the second of her four Carry On appearances. Carry On Screaming! is a parody of the Hammer horror films, which were also popular at the time. The film was followed by Don't Lose Your Head (1967).

== Plot ==
In the Edwardian era, in Hocombe Woods, Doris Mann and Albert Potter are courting. When Albert searches the woods for a peeping Tom, Doris is abducted by a monster named Oddbod, who leaves a finger behind. Albert finds the finger and rushes to the police station to report the matter to Detective Constable Slobotham, who in turn tells his superior, the henpecked Detective Sergeant Sidney Bung, who has been investigating similar disappearances in the same woods.

After searching the woods for further clues, the group stumble across the eerie Bide-A-Wee Rest Home, and are shown to the sitting-room by the butler, Sockett. (Note: A character with a strong resemblance to Lurch in The Addams Family.) Sockett informs the mistress of the house, the seductive Valeria, of the men's presence, and she in turn awakens her electrically charged brother, Dr. Orlando Watt. Dr. Watt speaks to the three, who are frightened from the house when Dr. Watt vanishes when his electrical charge runs down and reappears when he is plugged in.

The next day, Bung, Slobotham and Potter interview Dan Dann, a lavatory attendant who once worked at Bide-A-Wee as a gardener, but Dann is silenced by Oddbod before he can reveal anything. Meanwhile, the police scientist accidentally creates a second creature—Oddbod Junior—when subjecting Oddbod's finger to an electrical charge. After killing the scientist, Oddbod Junior makes his way to the mansion, where Valeria and Watt are turning people into mannequins (Note: In the manner of House of Wax.) to sell. Bung arrives at the house to investigate Dann's death, but becomes infatuated with Valeria instead.

The next day, Potter discovers Doris—in mannequin form—in a milliner's shop, but no proof can be found that it really is Doris. Bung returns to the house and discovers evidence that links Valeria and Watt to the mannequin but remains oblivious. Believing him to be on their scent, Valeria and Watt use a potion to turn Bung into a hairy monster man and order him to steal the mannequin for them. After recovering the next day, Bung and Slobotham decide to set a trap in Hocombe Woods, with Slobotham disguised as a woman for bait. Bung's sharp-tongued wife Emily follows, thinking that Bung is having an affair, and is captured by Oddbod Junior while Slobotham is captured by Oddbod. Bung, now teamed up with Potter, makes his way to the house whilst following their footprints.

After failing to dispose of Bung and Potter with a snake, the Oddbods are dispatched to deal with them. Bung and Potter are reunited with Slobotham and manage to return Doris to human form, but discover that Emily has been turned into a mannequin. A battle follows, in which Albert (in monster form) defeats the Oddbods. Dr. Watt menaces them with petrifying liquid but is threatened by the re-animated mummy of Rubbatiti, who has come alive following a lightning strike. Rubbatiti and Watt fall into a boiling vat in the cellar, killing them both. Albert and Doris marry some time later, and discover that Bung, whose home lacks electricity, is unable to return his wife to human form, and is now living with Valeria.

== Cast ==
- Harry H. Corbett as Detective Sergeant Sidney Bung
- Kenneth Williams as Dr Orlando Watt
- Peter Butterworth as Detective Constable Slobotham
- Jim Dale as Albert Potter
- Fenella Fielding as Valeria Watt
- Tom Clegg as Oddbod
- Bernard Bresslaw as Sockett
- Billy Cornelius as Oddbod Junior
- Joan Sims as Emily Bung
- Charles Hawtrey as Dan Dann
- Angela Douglas as Doris Mann
- Jon Pertwee as Doctor Fettle
- Michael Ward as Mr Vivian
- Norman Mitchell as Cabby
- Frank Thornton as Mr Jones
- Frank Forsyth as Desk Sergeant
- Anthony Sagar as Policeman
- Sally Douglas as Girl
- Marianne Stone as Mrs Parker
- Denis Blake as Rubbatiti
- Gerald Thomas as Voice of Oddbod Junior (uncredited)

== Production ==
Production of the film ran from 10 January 1966 to 25 February 1966; it was filmed at Pinewood Studios and on location in Berkshire and Buckinghamshire.

Harry H. Corbett replaced Sid James, who was committed to appearing as a robber in the pantomime Babes in the Wood at the London Palladium, which ran until June 1966.

Deborah Kerr was initially offered the role of Valeria, but declined. The character is frequently referred to as a vampire, despite the film never stating her to be one. Rather, she is more a parody of Morticia Addams.

The character of Orlando Watt was initially written as Valeria's father. This was changed at the request of actor Kenneth Williams, who wanted to play a character of his own age (39), so that Orlando and Valeria are brother and sister in the finished version.

Charles Hawtrey was added to the cast at the eleventh hour, after American distributors specifically requested him, as he was such a hit and crowd-pleaser with audiences there. He replaced Sydney Bromley in the role of Dan Dann, in what would have been a minor role in the film. Hawtrey thereby has the unique distinction of being the only actor to have a leading credit in a Carry On for less than five minutes' screen time.

== Soundtrack ==
Carry On Screaming! was the second film in the series to have a sung main title theme. The theme song "Carry On Screaming" (film version only) was credited as "Anon" and was once thought to have been sung by Jim Dale, who appears in the film. The singer is actually Ray Pilgrim, a session singer who sang for the Embassy label. A vinyl 45 rpm version of the song was also released in 1966 (Columbia DB 7972) by vocalist Boz Burrell, before he became bassist for the bands King Crimson and Bad Company.

== Filming and locations ==
- Filming dates: 10 January – 25 February 1966

Interiors:

- Pinewood Studios, Buckinghamshire

Exteriors:

- Windsor, Berkshire
- Fulmer, Buckinghamshire

== Critical reception ==
The Monthly Film Bulletin wrote: "Apart from an engaging performance by Jim Dale (and some appealing squeaks from monster Odbodd Junior, alias Billy Cornelius), this is glum stuff even by Carry On standards. The regulars, Kenneth Williams in particular, seem too bored to care; Harry H. Corbett overdoes every line; and the horror clichés are rather less amusing than the straight routines in some of Hammer's early epics."

In a 2018 retrospective on the series, the British Film Institute named Carry On Screaming! as one of the series' five best films, alongside Carry On Cleo (1964), Carry On Up the Khyber (1968), Carry On Camping (1969), and Carry On Matron (1972).

== Sources ==
- Rigelsford, Adrian (1996). Carry On Laughing: A Celebration. London: Virgin Books. ISBN 1-85227-554-5.
- Ross, Robert (1998) [1996]. The Carry On Companion. London: Batsford. ISBN 0-7134-8439-X.
