= Carry On Emmannuelle =

1978 British comedy film by Gerald Thomas

- Original UK quad poster
- Directed by: Gerald Thomas
- Written by: Lance Peters
- Produced by: Peter Rogers
- Starring: Kenneth Williams; Kenneth Connor; Joan Sims; Jack Douglas; Peter Butterworth; Beryl Reid; Suzanne Danielle
- Cinematography: Alan Hume
- Edited by: Peter Boita
- Music by: Eric Rogers
- Production company: Hemdale
- Distributed by: The Rank Organisation; Hemdale
- Release date: 24 November 1978
- Running time: 88 minutes
- Country: United Kingdom
- Language: English
- Budget: £349,302
- Box office: £48,003

Carry On Emmannuelle is a 1978 British comedy film, the 30th release in the series of 31 Carry On films (1958–1992). The film was to be the final Carry On for many regulars, including Kenneth Williams (in his 26th Carry On), Kenneth Connor (in his 17th), Joan Sims (in her 24th) and Peter Butterworth (in his 16th). Jack Douglas is the only regular from this film to bridge the gap to Carry On Columbus. Beryl Reid, Henry McGee and Suzanne Danielle make their only appearances in the series here. The film featured a change in style, becoming more openly sexual and explicit. This was highlighted by the implied behaviour of Danielle's character, though she does not bare any more flesh than any other Carry On female lead. These changes brought the film closer to the then popular X-rated series of Confessions... comedies, or indeed the actual Emmanuelle films that it parodies. This film, as well as the initial release of Carry On England, were the only films in the series to be certified AA by the British Board of Film Censors, which restricted audiences to those aged 14 and over. The film was followed by the final installment of the series Carry On Columbus in 1992.

== Plot ==
Emmannuelle Prévert relieves the boredom of a flight on Concorde by seducing timid Theodore Valentine. She returns home to London to surprise her husband, the French ambassador Émile Prevert, but first surprises the butler, Lyons. He removes her coat, only to find that she has left her dress on the aircraft. The chauffeur, Leyland, housekeeper, Mrs Dangle, and aged boot-boy, Richmond sense saucy times ahead… and they are right! Émile is dedicated to his bodybuilding, leaving a sexually frustrated Emmannuelle to find pleasure with everyone from the Lord Chief Justice to chat show host Harold Hump. Theodore is spurned by Emmannuelle, who has genuinely forgotten their airborne encounter, and despite reassurances from his mother, exacts revenge by revealing Emmannuelle's antics to the press. However, after a visit to her doctor, she discovers that she is pregnant and decides to settle down to a faithful marriage with Émile… and dozens of children.

== Cast ==
- Kenneth Williams as Émile Prévert
- Suzanne Danielle as Emmannuelle Prévert
- Kenneth Connor as Leyland
- Jack Douglas as Lyons
- Joan Sims as Mrs. Dangle
- Peter Butterworth as Richmond
- Larry Dann as Theodore Valentine
- Beryl Reid as Mrs. Valentine
- Henry McGee as Harold Hump
- Victor Maddern as Man In Launderette
- Dino Shafeek as Immigration Officer
- Eric Barker as Ancient General
- Joan Benham as Cynical Lady
- Albert Moses as Doctor
- Robert Dorning as Prime Minister
- Steve Plytas as Arabian Official
- Michael Nightingale as Police Commissioner
- Bruce Boa as U.S. Ambassador
- Llewellyn Rees as Lord Chief Justice
- Jack Lynn as Admiral
- Claire Davenport as Blonde In Pub
- Norman Mitchell as Drunken Husband
- Tricia Newby as Nurse In Surgery
- James Fagan as Concorde Steward
- Malcolm Johns as Sentry
- Howard Nelson as Harry Hernia
- Tim Brinton as BBC Newscaster
- Corbett Woodall as ITN Newscaster
- Marianne Maskell as Nurse In Hospital
- Louise Burton as Girl At Zoo
- Gertan Klauber as German Soldier
- John Carlin as French Parson
- Guy Ward as Dandy
- John Hallet as Substitute Football Player
- Deborah Brayshaw as French Buxom Blonde
- Suzanna East as Colette
- Bruce Wylie as Football Referee
- Philip Clifton as Injured Footballer
- Stanley McGeagh as Fleet Street Journalist
- Bill Hutchinson as 1st Reporter
- Neville Ware as 2nd Reporter
- Jane Norman as 3rd Reporter
- Nick White as Sent-Off Footballer

== Crew ==
- Screenplay – Lance Peters
- Music – Eric Rogers
- Song – Kenny Lynch
- Performers – Masterplan
- Director of Photography – Alan Hume
- Editor – Peter Boita
- Art Director – Jack Sampan
- Production Manager – Roy Goddard
- Camera Operator – Godfrey Godar
- Make-up – Robin Grantham
- Production Executive for Cleves – Donald Langdon
- Assistant Director – Gregory Dark
- Sound Recordists – Danny Daniel & Otto Snel
- Continuity – Marjorie Lavelly
- Wardrobe – Margaret Lewin
- Stills Cameraman – Ken Bray
- Hairdresser – Betty Sherriff
- Costume Designer – Courtenay Elliott
- Set Dresser – John Hoesli
- Assistant Editor – Jack Gardner
- Dubbing Editor – Peter Best
- Titles & Opticals – GSE Ltd
- Processor – Technicolor Ltd
- Producer – Peter Rogers
- Director – Gerald Thomas

== Filming and locations ==
- Filming dates – 10 April-15 May 1978

Interiors:

- Pinewood Studios, Buckinghamshire

Exteriors:

- Wembley, London
- Trafalgar Square, London
- Oxford Street, London
- London Zoo, London

The movie was financed by Hemdale, not Rank.

== Critical reception ==
Critical response was universally negative, even more so than Carry On England which preceded it, and Carry On Columbus which succeeded it 14 years later. Philip French said of it: "This relentless sequence of badly-written, badly-timed dirty jokes is surely one of the most morally and aesthetically offensive pictures to emerge from a British studio." Christopher Tookey considered the film to be "embarrassingly feeble". In the 1980s Williams himself said of the film: "The script left a lot to be desired and I have to admit that I found many of the jokes quite repulsive". The film performed poorly at the box office and during the first two decades following its release it was only broadcast on UK television in a late night slot, leading author Adrian Rigelsford to comment in 1996 that out of the thirty-one Carry On films it was "the one that barely anybody's seen".

Whilst many other Carry Ons have continued to be popular, opinions of Carry on Emmannuelle and its immediate predecessor and successor have not improved over the passing of time, and Carry On Emmannuelle is often considered to be the worst film in the series. Tom Cole, writing in the Radio Times, found it "undignified" and "laugh-free", noting that the Lolita-esque performance of Suzanne Danielle was "unintentionally creepy". And both Cole and Ian Freer, writing for Empire, laid the blame for the death of the series squarely at the film's door.

In a 2018 retrospective on the series, the British Film Institute named Carry On Emmannuelle as one of the series' five worst films, alongside Carry On Girls (1973), Carry On England (1976), That's Carry On! (1977), and Carry On Columbus (1992).

In 2023, actor Larry Dann dedicated a chapter of his autobiography Oh, What A Lovely Memoir to share his memories of the making of this production, where he recalls members of the audience walking out before the credits rolled.

== Bibliography ==
- Bright, Morris; Ross, Robert (2000). Mr Carry On: The Life & Work of Peter Rogers. London: BBC Books. ISBN 978-0563551836. OCLC 46685742.
- Dann, Larry (2023). Oh, What a Lovely Memoir. Cambridge: Devonfire Books. ISBN 978-1838281946. OCLC 1527587809.
- Davidson, Andy (2012). Carry On Confidential. Tadworth, UK: Miwk Publishing. ISBN 978-1908630018. OCLC 839306567.
- Eastaugh, Kenneth (1978). The Carry On Book. Newton Abbot, UK: David & Charles. ISBN 978-0715374030.
- Hibbin, Sally & Nina (1988). What a Carry On. London: Hamlyn. ISBN 978-0600558194. OCLC 19354015.
- Hudis, Norman (2008). No Laughing Matter: How I Carried On. Clacton on Sea, UK: Apex Publishing. ISBN 978-1906358150. OCLC 747427276.
- Rigelsford, Adrian (1996). Carry On Laughing: A Celebration. London: Virgin Books. ISBN 1-85227-554-5. OCLC 35779028.
- Ross, Robert (2002). The Carry On Companion. London: B.T. Batsford. ISBN 978-0713487718. OCLC 52687861.
- Sheridan, Simon (2011). Keeping the British End Up: Four Decades of Saucy Cinema (Fourth ed.). London: Titan Books. ISBN 978-0857682796. OCLC 979197510.
- Webber, Richard (2009). 50 Years of Carry On. London: Arrow. ISBN 9780099490074. OCLC 321014420.
