= Carry On Cabby =

1963 British comedy film by Gerald Thomas

- Original UK quad poster
- Directed by: Gerald Thomas
- Screenplay by: Talbot Rothwell
- Story by: Dick Hills and Sid Green
- Produced by: Peter Rogers
- Starring: Sid James; Hattie Jacques; Kenneth Connor; Charles Hawtrey; Esma Cannon; Liz Fraser; Bill Owen; Milo O'Shea; Judith Furse; Ambrosine Phillpotts; Renée Houston; Jim Dale
- Cinematography: Alan Hume
- Edited by: Archie Ludski
- Music by: Eric Rogers
- Production company: Peter Rogers Productions
- Distributed by: Anglo-Amalgamated/ Warner-Pathé Distributors
- Release date: 7 November 1963
- Running time: 91 minutes
- Country: United Kingdom
- Language: English
- Budget: £149,986

Carry On Cabby is a 1963 British comedy film, the seventh in the series of thirty-one Carry On films (1958–1992). Released on 7 November 1963, it was the first to have a screenplay written by Talbot Rothwell (although the first screenplay "Tolly" submitted to Peter Rogers was developed as Carry On Jack) from a story by Dick Hills and Sid Green (script writers for Morecambe and Wise).

Regulars Sid James, Hattie Jacques, Kenneth Connor and Charles Hawtrey are all present. Liz Fraser makes her third appearance (and last for more than a decade) and both Bill Owen and Esma Cannon make their final (and in both cases, fourth) appearances. This was the first film in the series to feature Carry On regular Jim Dale, and the first not to feature Kenneth Williams in the cast. Williams turned down the role of Allbright due to what he considered an inferior script. The part was scaled down, and given to Norman Chappell.

Carry On Cabby was originally planned as a non-Carry On film, called Call Me A Cab (after a stage play) but midway through development it became part of the Carry On series. The film is notable from others in the series for its dramatic plotline of a troubled marriage. The film was followed by Carry On Jack (1964).

== Plot ==
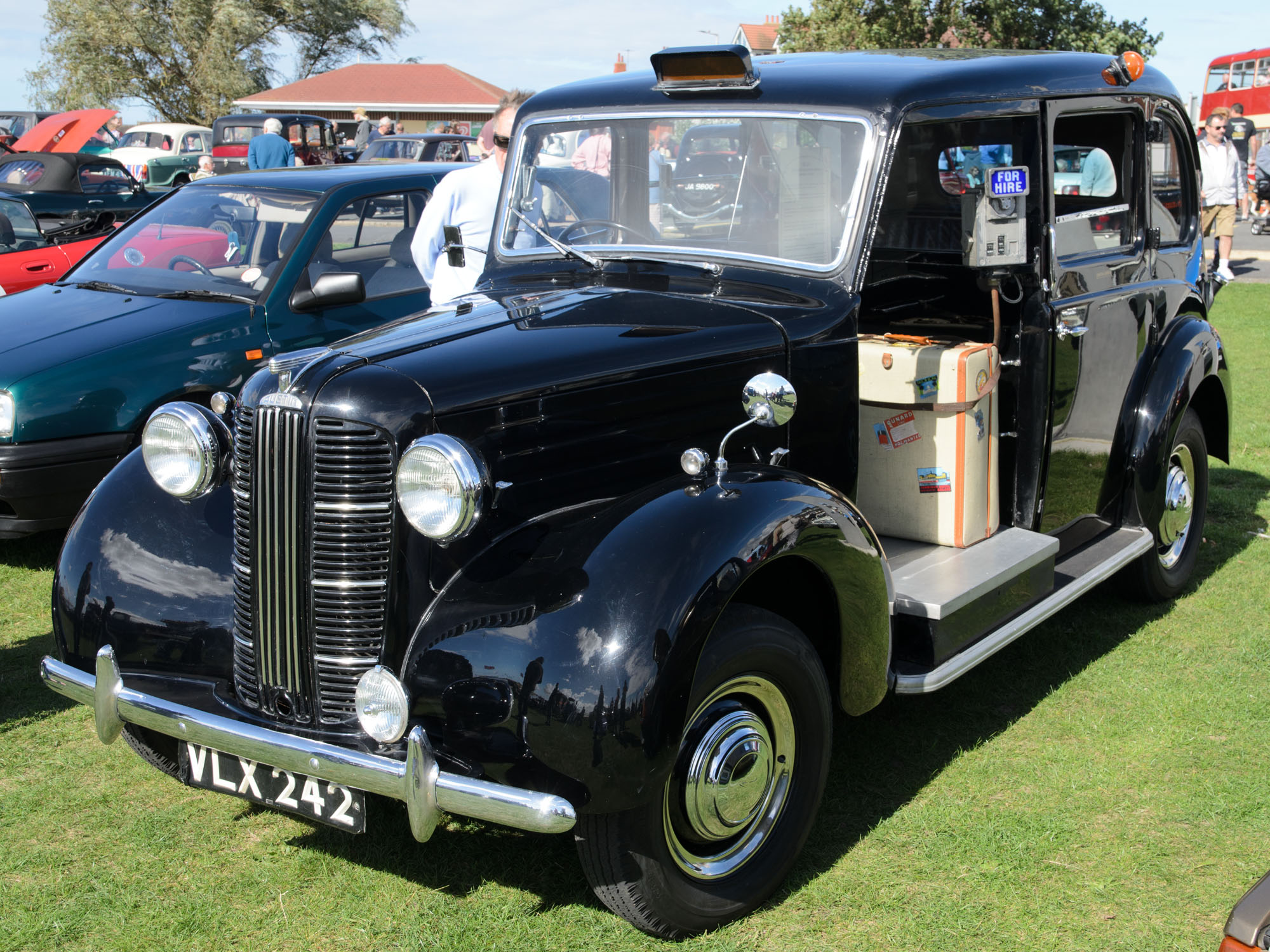
Austin FX3 taxicab

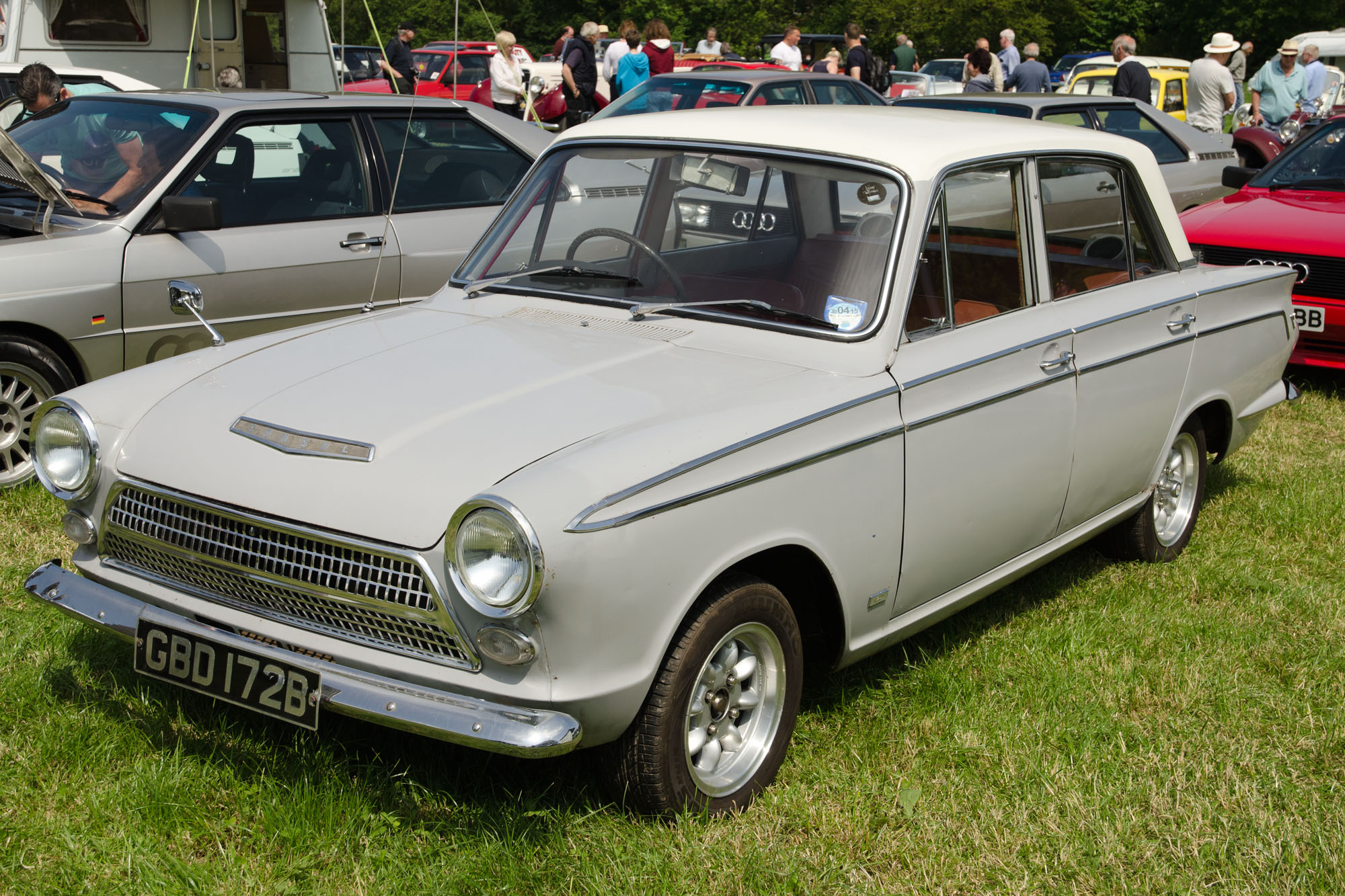
Ford Cortina

Charlie Hawkins is the workaholic owner of Speedee Taxis. His wife Peggy feels neglected because he works long hours. When Charlie misses their fifteenth wedding anniversary because he is out cabbing, after promising Peggy a night out, she decides to punish him. For tax reasons, all the company funds are held in Peggy's name, so she tells Charlie that she is going to 'get a job', then uses the money to establish a rival company, GlamCabs. The cars are brand new Ford Cortina Mk1s driven by attractive girls in provocative uniforms. Flo, the wife of one of Charlie's drivers, is appointed to the post of office manager. Sally, the waitress at the Speedee cab cafe, who is similarly neglected by her boyfriend, Ted Watson, the cab company manager, spies on Charlies and Ted and reports back to Peggy.

Charlie continues to coach his mainly inept drivers, including the clumsy Terry "Pintpot" Tankard (Charles Hawtrey), whilst Peggy refuses to tell Charlie about her new job. Charlie feigns a lack of interest, but he is dying to know what she is up to, particularly as he gets a taste of his own medicine because she now works long hours. He struggles to cope while Peggy's company becomes a thriving success due to the large number of male taxi passengers preferring to ogle her sexy drivers during journeys. Speedee rapidly starts losing money and faces bankruptcy. Peggy feels terrible for what she has done. Charlie and his drivers attempt to sabotage the rival company, but they are chased off when the GlamCab girls spray them with hoses. In desperation, Charlie suggests a merger with his rivals, but is furious to discover who the real owner is and storms off.

A month later, Peggy is living at the office and Charlie has turned to drink, allowing his company to collapse around him. Peggy and Sally are hijacked by gangsters. Peggy manages to use the taxi radio to subtly reveal their situation and location. Charlie intercepts the broadcast and rallies the other Speedee drivers in pursuit. The outlaws are cornered and captured. Peggy and Charlie are reconciled and overjoyed to learn she is expecting a baby.

== Cast ==
- Sid James as Charlie Hawkins
- Hattie Jacques as Peggy Hawkins
- Charles Hawtrey as Terry "Pintpot" Tankard
- Kenneth Connor as Ted Watson
- Esma Cannon as Flo Sims
- Liz Fraser as Sally
- Bill Owen as Smiley Sims
- Milo O'Shea as Len
- Jim Dale as Expectant father (credited as "Small man" and named "Jeremy" in the film)
- Norman Chappell as Allbright
- Judith Furse as Battleaxe
- Renée Houston as Molly
- Ambrosine Phillpotts as Aristocratic lady
- Amanda Barrie as Anthea
- Carole Shelley as Dumb driver
- Cyril Chamberlain as Sarge
- Peter Gilmore as Dancy
- Michael Ward as Man in tweeds
- Noel Dyson as District nurse
- Michael Nightingale as Businessman
- Ian Wilson as Clerk
- Peter Byrne as Bridegroom
- Darryl Kavann as Punchy
- Peter Jesson as Car salesman
- Don McCorkindale as Tubby
- Charles Stanley as Geoff
- Marian Collins as Bride
- Frank Forsyth as Chauffeur
- Norman Mitchell as Bespectacled businessman (uncredited)
- Marian Horton as Glamcab driver (uncredited)
- Valerie Van Ost as Glamcab driver (uncredited)

== Crew ==
- Screenplay – Talbot Rothwell
- Idea – SC Green & RM Hills
- Music – Eric Rogers
- Associate Producer – Frank Bevis
- Art Director – Jack Stephens
- Editor – Archie Ludski
- Director of Photography – Alan Hume
- Camera Operator – Godfrey Godar
- Unit Manager – Donald Toms
- Assistant Director – Peter Bolton
- Sound Editor – Arthur Ridout
- Sound Recordists – Bill Daniels & Gordon K McCallum
- Hairdressing – Biddy Chrystal
- Make-up Artists – Geoffrey Rodway & Jim Hydes
- Continuity – Penny Daniels
- Costume Designer – Joan Ellacott
- Producer – Peter Rogers
- Director – Gerald Thomas

== Filming and locations ==
- Filming dates: 25 March – 7 May 1963

Interiors:

- Pinewood Studios, Buckinghamshire

Exteriors:

- The streets of Windsor

The scene in which "Pintpot" (Charles Hawtrey) drives a cab (PEG 1) round and round a roundabout was filmed at the junction of Goswell Road and Arthur Road, Windsor, with the railway arches of Windsor & Eton Central Station visible in the background. This area has changed considerably since 1963 with the building of King Edward Court and Ward Royal. Some filming was also undertaken in Farm Yard opposite Windsor & Eton Riverside Station.

The filming of Carry On Cabby is portrayed in the BBC drama Hattie, a dramatisation of the life of Hattie Jacques.

== Release ==
First screened to the trade (cinema distributors) on 22 August 1963, the film went on general release across the UK later the same year on 7 November.

== See also ==
- Taxi! – contemporary TV series with Sid James in a similar role to Carry On Cabby

== Bibliography ==
- Davidson, Andy (2012). Carry On Confidential. London: Miwk. ISBN 978-1-908630-01-8.
- Sheridan, Simon (2011). Keeping the British End Up – Four Decades of Saucy Cinema. London: Titan Books. ISBN 978-0-85768-279-6.
- Webber, Richard (2009). 50 Years of Carry On. London: Arrow. ISBN 978-0-09-949007-4.
- Hudis, Norman (2008). No Laughing Matter. London: Apex. ISBN 978-1-906358-15-0.
- Ross, Robert (1998) [1996]. The Carry On Companion. London: Batsford. ISBN 0-7134-8439-X.
- Bright, Morris; Ross, Robert (2000). Mr Carry On – The Life & Work of Peter Rogers. London: BBC Books. ISBN 978-0-563-55183-6.
- Rigelsford, Adrian (1996). Carry On Laughing – a celebration. London: Virgin. ISBN 1-85227-554-5.
- Hibbin, Sally & Nina (1988). What a Carry On. London: Hamlyn. ISBN 978-0-600-55819-4.
- Eastaugh, Kenneth (1978). The Carry On Book. London: David & Charles. ISBN 978-0-7153-7403-0.
