= Rosslyn Bruce =

English Anglican priest (1871–1956)

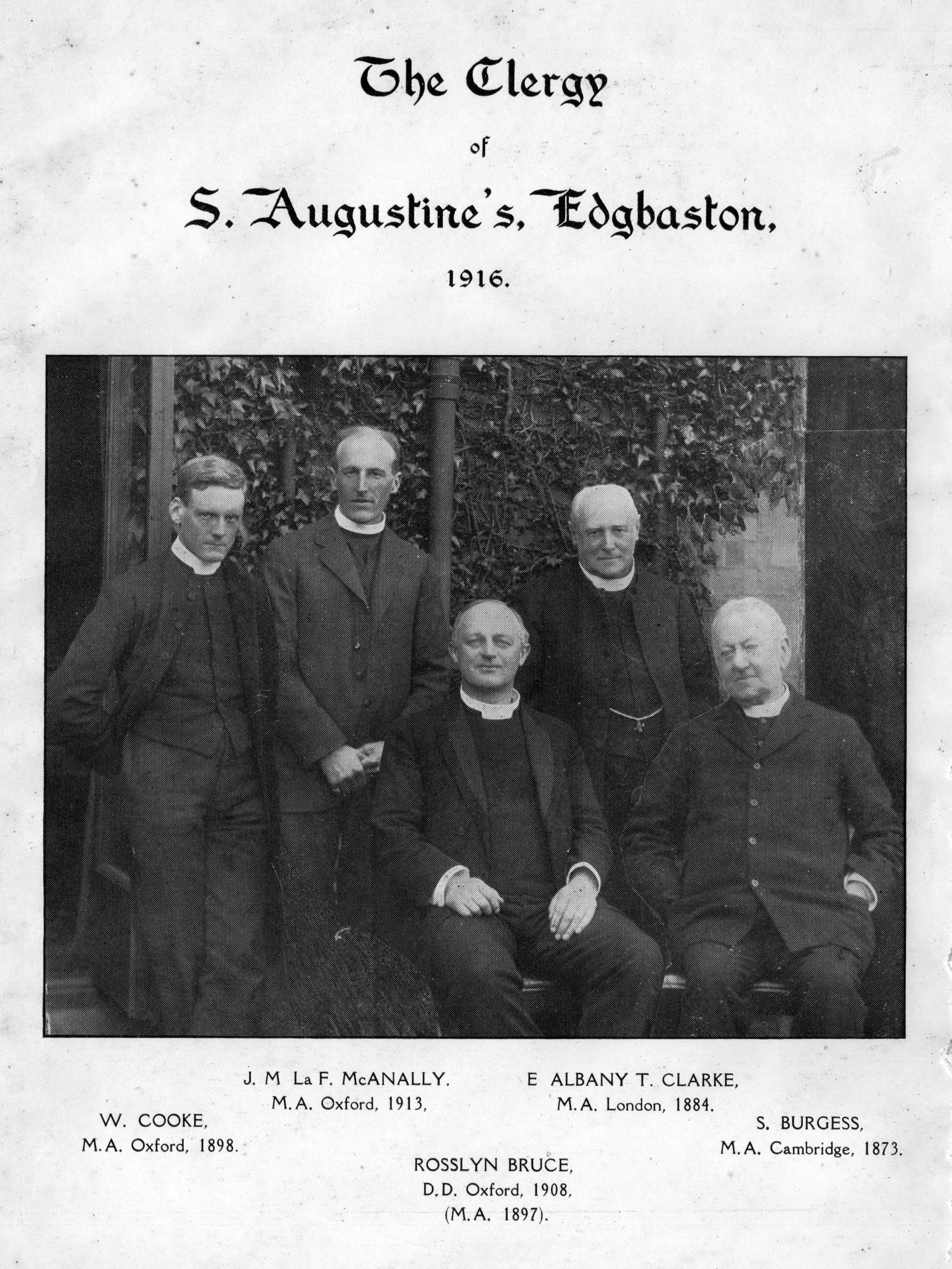
- Born: Francis Rosslyn Courtenay Bruce; 14 August 1871; Barton in Fabis, Nottinghamshire, England
- Died: 19 January 1956 (aged 84); Herstmonceux, Sussex, England
- Occupations: Priest, naturalist, writer
- Children: Verily Anderson
- Relatives: Sir James Bruce, 2nd Baronet (grandfather); Archbishop William Thompson (uncle); Kathleen Scott (sister): Rachel Anderson (granddaughter); Janie Hampton (granddaughter)

Francis Rosslyn Courtenay Bruce (14 August 1871 – 19 January 1956) was an English Anglican priest, naturalist and writer.

== Biography ==
Bruce was the grandson of Sir James Bruce, 2nd Baronet who fought at Waterloo; son of Lloyd Stuart Bruce, a canon of York Minster from 1873 to 1876; nephew of Archbishop William Thompson; brother of Kathleen Scott (and brother-in-law of Robert Falcon Scott); and father of Verily Anderson, who wrote a biography of him entitled The Last of the Eccentrics (1972).

Bruce was educated at St Edward's School, Oxford and Worcester College, Oxford. During his years at Oxford, he stood for the presidency of the Union but was beaten by Hilaire Belloc, instead becoming secretary.

Bruce was ordained deacon in 1897, and priest in 1898. After curacies in Dinting Vale and Soho, he was Rector of Clifton with Glapton from 1904 to 1912; a Chaplain to the Forces; the incumbent at St Augustine, Edgbaston, from 1912 to 1923, and lived at the vicarage at 4 Manor Road, the next-door neighbour of Sir Gilbert Barling, and finally of All Saints' Herstmonceux. He was also Grand Chaplain of the United Grand Lodge of England.

A vigorous campaigner for many causes, especially against cruelty to animals: he was himself a renowned breeder of Smooth Fox Terriers.

== Writings ==
Bruce's writings include:

- Oxford Verses (1896)
- Men and Women of Soho (1900)
- The Common Hope ( 1904)
- The Clifton Book (1906)
- Prayers for Daily Use (1913)
- God and the Allies (1925)
- Sussex Sacred Song (1927)
- Herstmonceux Church (1951)
