= Verily Anderson =

British writer, screenwriter and genealogist (1915–2010)

- Born: Verily Bruce; 12 January 1915; Edgbaston, Birmingham, England
- Died: 16 July 2010 (aged 95); Frogshall, Northrepps, Norfolk, England
- Education: Royal College of Music
- Occupation: Writer
- Notable work: Spam Tomorrow (1956); Beware of Children (1958)
- Spouses: Captain Donald Clive Anderson (m. 1940; died 1957) Paul Paget (m. 1971; died 1985)
- Children: 5, inc. Rachel Anderson and Janie Hampton
- Parent(s): Rosslyn Bruce and Rachel Gurney

Verily Anderson (12 January 1915 – 16 July 2010) was a British author, best known for writing the screenplay of the 1960 film No Kidding, based on her 1958 book Beware of Children, for writing Brownie books and writing genealogical books about the Gurney, Barclay and Buxton families.

== Biography ==
Born as Verily Bruce on 12 January 1915 in Edgbaston, Birmingham, England, she was the daughter of Francis Rosslyn Courtenay Bruce and Rachel Gurney, the fourth of her parents' five children.

Verily Bruce was educated at Edgbaston High School for Girls, Birmingham, between the ages of four and seven, then she attended Normanhurst School in Battle, Sussex. At 16, she attended the Royal College of Music in London. She was in the First Aid Nursing Yeomanry between 1938 and 1941.

On 2 August 1940, she married Captain Donald Clive Anderson (1897–1957), thereafter using the name Verily Anderson for her writing. She achieved success at the age of 41, in 1956, with the publication of Spam Tomorrow, "a deft and frequently uproarious account of her wartime experiences on the home front...a new kind of memoir, one of the first to explore the lives of women in wartime." The Andersons ran a holiday home in Sussex catering for children of parents living abroad – characterised by one newspaper as "infant pandemonium" because of its no-rules philosophy. After her husband died, leaving five children aged from three to 15, Anderson wrote with increased vigour, and her 1958 book, Beware of Children, was adapted for the film No Kidding (1960) by the producers of the Carry On series, starring Leslie Phillips, Geraldine McEwan and Joan Hickson.

Between 1946 and 2002, Anderson also worked with the BBC in TV and radio, on Woman's Hour and writing TV plays.

On 10 August 1971, she married Paul Edward Paget (1901–1985). Her maid of honour was Joyce Grenfell and John Betjeman was best man.

Verily Anderson last lived in Frogshall, Northrepps, Norfolk, where she died at home on 16 July 2010, aged 95, just after completing a book, Castellans of Herstmonceux (1911-2010) (Bader International Study Centre, 2011). She is buried with her husband Paul Paget in the neighbouring village of Sidestrand.

She had five children, including Rachel Anderson, author of children's literature, and Janie Hampton, author, radio producer and international health planner.

== Gurney family history and genealogy ==
Anderson wrote two books about the Gurney, Barclay and Buxton families:

- The Northrepps Grandchildren, published in 1968 (ISBN 1-898030-67-7); reprinted in 1979 and 2000.
  - Northrepps Hall is a converted farmhouse near Cromer, Norfolk, which has been occupied by the same family for more than eight generations and is now Grade II listed. Anderson's book is about the house and the families who lived there.
- Friends and Relations: Three Centuries of Quaker Families, published in 1980 (ISBN 1-898030-84-7); a family history of the Gurney family, using information from family records.

== Books ==
=== Brownie books ===
- Towards the Golden Hand. A play for Brownies; 1948.
- Magic for the Golden Bar A play for Brownies; 1953.
- Amanda and the Brownies. Illustrated by Joan Milroy; 1960.
- The Brownies and the Golden Hand. Illustrated by Edgar Norfield; 1963.
- The Brownies and the Ponies. Illustrated by Edgar Norfield; 1965.
- Brownies on Wheels, 1966.
- The Brownies and the Wedding Day, 1974.
- Brownies' Cook-Book, 1974.
- The Brownies and the Christening, 1977.
- Brownies' Day Abroad, 1984.

=== Other children's books ===
- Vanload to Venice. Illustrated by Margaret Ingram; 1961.
- Nine Times Never. Illustrated by Edward Lewis; 1962.
- The Yorks in London. Illustrated by Nathaniel Mayer; 1964.
- Clover Coverdale, 1966.
- Camp Fire Cook-Book, 1976.

=== Autobiography ===
- Spam Tomorrow, 1956. Reprinted by Dean Street Press, 2019 (ISBN 978 1 913054 21 2).
- Our Square, 1957.
- Beware of Children, 1958.
- Daughters of Divinity, 1960.
- The Flo Affair, 1963.
- Scrambled Egg for Christmas; line drawings by Marian O'Hare; 1970.

=== Non-fiction ===
- The Northrepps Grandchildren, 1968.
- The Last of the Eccentrics: A Life of Rosslyn Bruce, 1972.
- Friends and Relations: Three Centuries of Quaker Families, 1980.
- The De Veres of Castle Hedingham, 1993.
- Castellans of Herstmonceux (1911–2010), 2011 (ISBN 978-0956848307).

== Film ==
Beware of Children, 1960, renamed No Kidding in North America. Directed by Gerald Thomas and starring Leslie Phillips, Geraldine McEwan and Julia Lockwood.
