= Stefan Pasiakos =

U.S. physiologist

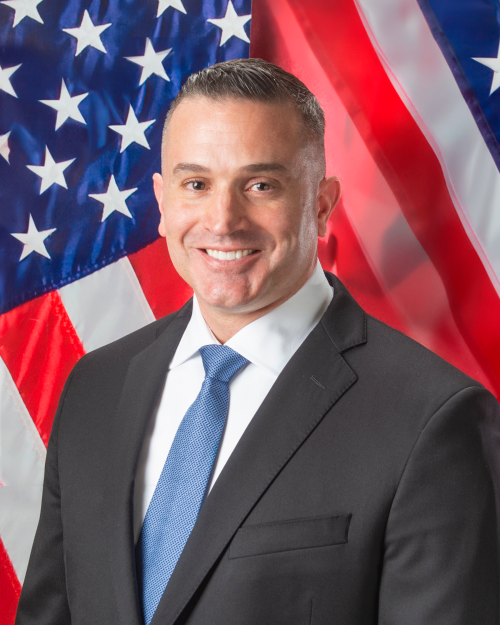
- Born: Stefan M. Pasiakos
- Education: University of Connecticut
- Scientific career
- Fields: Physiology, dietary supplements, performance science
- Workplaces: United States Army Research Institute of Environmental Medicine; National Institutes of Health

Stefan M. Pasiakos is a U.S. physiologist specializing in diet and supplemental nutrition, muscle physiology, and human performance. He has served as the director of the National Institutes of Health (NIH) office of dietary supplements since 2023. Pasiakos was previously chief of the military performance division at the United States Army Research Institute of Environmental Medicine.

== Life ==
Pasiakos received his Ph.D. in Nutritional Science in 2008 from the University of Connecticut and completed a postdoctoral fellowship in the Military Nutrition Division (MND) at United States Army Research Institute of Environmental Medicine (USARIEM) in 2012 as a United States Army Medical Service Corps officer.

From 2012 to 2021, Pasiakos led an interdisciplinary research program in the MND to refine dietary protein requirements for soldiers and develop targeted dietary strategies that sustain muscle mass during strenuous operations, fields for which he is internationally recognized. His academic interests included diet and supplemental nutrition, muscle physiology, human performance, and bioenergetics of exercise metabolism. Pasiakos is a member of the American Society for Nutrition, fellow of the American College of Sports Medicine (ACSM), and associate editor for Medicine & Science in Sports & Exercise. Pasiakos was a research physiologist and chief of the military performance division at the USARIEM, where he led a research program and scientific team to develop evidence-based solutions to limit musculoskeletal injuries, accelerate return to duty, and optimize physical and behavioral performance in military training and operational environments.

On July 16, 2023, Pasiakos became director of the National Institutes of Health (NIH) office of dietary supplements. He succeeded acting director David M. Murray.
