= Julia Lockwood =

British actress (1941–2019)

- Lockwood in London, 1991
- Born: Margaret Julia Leon; 23 August 1941; Ringwood, Hampshire, England
- Died: 24 March 2019 (aged 77); Taunton, Somerset, England
- Occupation: Actress
- Years active: 1947–1977
- Spouse: Ernest Clark (m. 1972; died 1994)
- Children: 4
- Parent: Margaret Lockwood

Julia Lockwood (born Margaret Julia Leon; 23 August 1941 – 24 March 2019) was a British actress. Daughter of Margaret Lockwood, her career began as a child actress at the age of 4 and spanned 30 years in film, television and the theatre.

== Early life ==
She was born in Ringwood, England on 23 August 1941. Her mother, Margaret Lockwood, was one of Britain's most popular film stars of the 1930s and 1940s. Her father, Rupert Leon, was a commodities clerk who was serving in the British Army. During the war years, she lived with her maternal grandmother in Ringwood, but after her parents divorced in 1949, she moved to London to live with her mother in Roehampton, London.

Lockwood attended the Arts Educational Schools, London from the age of 5.

== Career ==
Lockwood's first appearance as a film actor was in the 1947 film Hungry Hill, alongside her mother; she was only four years old when filming began. She began to gain leading roles in the late 1950s, often in coming-of-age films such as Please Turn Over. She screen-tested for Hollywood with Columbia Pictures.

Her theatrical career began at the age of 12, when she was cast in the lead role in Alice in Wonderland at the Q Theatre in south-west London. She went on to star in numerous West End shows into the 1970s. However, it is in the play Peter Pan that she is perhaps most remembered.

“My obsession with Peter Pan began when I was eight years old. My mother, Margaret Lockwood was invited to play "The Immortal Boy" (as we called him) at the Scala theatre in 1949. I used to sit in the wings transfixed, longing to be up on the stage with her and the lost boys, flying through the air and fighting the pirates.”

She first played the role of Wendy opposite her mother in 1957, and then reprised the role the following year with Sarah Churchill (daughter of Winston Churchill and Clementine, Lady Churchill) in the title role. One performance was even visited by the Churchill family. In 1959, Julia finally achieved her dream of playing Peter; she would go on to play the lead role a further three times, in 1960, 1963 and 1966. She is one of only three actors to play both Wendy and Peter, and she is the only actor to have played Wendy opposite her own mother in the lead role.

Julia Lockwood's television career began at the age of 12, when she was cast in the lead role of the children's television film Heidi and the follow-up TV series Heidi Grows Up. She again featured alongside her mother in the 1957 series The Royalty, set in an exclusive London hotel. Both Lockwoods also appeared in the BBC's sequel series of 1965, The Flying Swan. During the 1950s and 1960s Julia was a regular feature of the small screen, appearing in over a dozen different television series. She is perhaps best remembered in the mid-1960s BBC soap opera Compact, set in the offices of a glossy women's magazine. Lockwood played the role of Anthea Keane, appearing in over 70 episodes. In 1971 she appeared in the BBC comedy series Birds on the Wing (with Richard Briers and Anne Rogers).

She was in the series Brothers in Law (with Richard Briers) in the 1970s.

Lockwood appeared on the front cover of Tatler magazine in February 1965.

She was one of five judges of the Miss England beauty pageant in 1965, alongside comedian Des O'Connor, actress Fenella Fielding, Patrick Wymark, and disc jockey Pete Murray.

In 1971, Lockwood released a 7" single on the Columbia label. The A-side was titled "He's and She's", the B-side "Edward, Alexander & Joe".

She worked as a drama teacher during the early 1990s at the Arts Educational Schools in Chiswick, London.

== Personal life and death ==
In 1972, she married Ernest Clark, a British actor, best known for playing Geoffrey Loftus in Doctor in the House and its TV sequels. She retired from acting in 1977 after the birth of her third child. She and her husband had three children. She also had a son from a previous relationship. Following Clark's death in 1994, Lockwood moved to Spain, but returned to the UK in 2007 and lived in Ilminster until her death.

Lockwood's last public appearance was in July 2015, at the unveiling of the blue plaque on her mother's house in Kingston upon Thames.

She died on 24 March 2019 after a short illness, surrounded by her children.

== Filmography ==
- Hungry Hill (1947) – Fanny's Daughter (uncredited)
- The White Unicorn (1947) – Norey
- The Flying Eye (1955) – Angela
- My Teenage Daughter (1956) – Poppet Carr
- The Solitary Child (1958) – Maggie
- Please Turn Over (1959) – Jo Halliday
- No Kidding (1960) – Fenella / 'Vanilla'

== Theatre credits ==
Year	Play	Author	Role	Director	With	Theatre	Ref
1953	Alice in Wonderland	Lewis Carroll	Alice		Peter Butterworth, Billy Thatcher	Q Theatre	
1957/58	Peter Pan	J.M. Barrie	Wendy	Hugh Miller	Margaret Lockwood, Michael Warre	Scala Theatre	
1958/59	Peter Pan	J. M. Barrie	Wendy		Sarah Churchill, John Justin	Scala Theatre	
1959/60	Peter Pan	J. M. Barrie	Peter		Richard Wordsworth, Patricia Garwood	Scala Theatre King's Theatre, Glasgow	
1960/61	Peter Pan	J. M. Barrie	Peter		Donald Sinden, Juliet Mills	Scala Theatre	
1962	Cry for Love (also known as The Devil Inside Him)	John Osborne (as Robert Owen)			Michael Williams, Richard Wordsworth, Patrick Desmond	Pembroke Theatre Sunderland Empire Theatre	
1962	No Time for Love	Liggat James			Barry Sinclair, Terence Duff	Golders Green Hippodrome	
1963/64	Peter Pan	J. M. Barrie	Peter		Alastair Sim	Scala Theatre	
1964	Every Other Evening	Jack Popplewell			Derek Farr, Margaret Lockwood, Diane Hart, Jeremy Bulloch	Phoenix Theatre	
1966	Arsenic And Old Lace	Joseph Kesselring	Elaine Harper	Murray Macdonald	Dame Sybil Thorndike, Athene Seyler, Richard Briers, Neil McCarthy	Vaudeville Theatre	
1966/67	Peter Pan	J.M. Barrie	Peter		Ron Moody, Mia Martin	Scala Theatre Royal Shakespeare Theatre	
1968	The Servant of Two Masters	Carlo Goldoni	Beatrice	Toby Robertson	Tommy Steel, Michele Dotrice, Clive Francis, Edward de Souza, Morag Hood, Graham Crowden	Queen's Theatre	
1969	Goodbye Charlie	George Axelrod	Virginia	David Butler	John Gregson, Lynda Baron	King's Theatre, Glasgow Ashcroft Theatre	
1969	Birds on the Wing	Peter Yeldham	Samantha	Harvey Medlinsky	Bruce Forsyth, June Barry	Piccadilly Theatre Royal Court Theatre, Liverpool	
1970/71	The Jockey Club Stakes	William Douglas Home		Murray MacDonald	Wilfrid Hyde White, Ernest Clark, Alastair Sim	Duke of York's Theatre Grand Theatre, Leeds	
1972	The Mating Game	Robin Hawdon	Julia Carrington	Ray Cooney	Avril Angers, Clive Francis, Aimi Macdonald, Terry Scott	Apollo Theatre	
1976	Out on a Limb	Joyce Rayburn	Ellie		Ian Carmichael, Phyllida Law, Hugh Paddick	Vaudeville Theatre The Alexandra, Birmingham	
1977	Sextet (or Six of One)	Michael Pertwee	Valerie	Robin Midgley	Leslie Phillips, Peter Blythe, Carol Hawkins, Angela Scoular, Julian Fellowes	Criterion Theatre	

== Television credits ==
Year	Title	For	Type	Episodes	Role	Ref
1953	Heidi	BBC	serial	6	Heidi	
1954	The Secret Way	BBC	film	1	Alexandra	
1954	Heidi Grows Up	BBC	serial	3	Heidi	
1954	A Mad Tea Party from 'Alice in Wonderland'	BBC	special	1	Alice	
1956	Tit-for-Tat	BBC	series (children's)	2	Narrator	
1956	Call It a Day	BBC	film	1	Ann Hilton	
1957	Alan Melville Takes You from A-Z: L	BBC	series	1	herself	
1957	Studio E: Getting to Know You	BBC	magazine	1	herself	
1957	Salute to Show Business	Associated-Rediffusion (ITV)	special	1	herself	
1957/58	The Royalty	BBC	serial	8	Carol	
1959	The Invisible Man	ITC (ITV)	serial	1	Suzy Owens	
1959	Don't Tell Father	Associated-Rediffusion (ITV)	serial	6	Julia Dean	
1959	Mainly for Women	BBC	magazine	1	herself	
1960	Interpol Calling	ITC (ITV)	serial	1	Louisa	
1960	Saturday Playhouse: Your Obedient Servant	BBC	play	1	Caroline Pemberton	
1961	Playdate: The Exam	Canadian Broadcasting Corporation	series	1	Elaine Gilbert	
1961/63	Juke Box Jury	BBC	music	3	herself	
1962	The Six Proud Walkers	BBC	serial	13	Martha Barlow	
1963	Compact	BBC	serial	73	Anthea Keane	
1963	This Is Your Life: Margaret Lockwood	BBC	documentary	1	herself	
1965	The Flying Swan	BBC	serial	24	Carol Manning	
1966	The Spies	BBC	serial	1	Jill	
1969	Out of the Unknown	BBC	series	1	Mary Beldon	
1971	Another Edward Woodward Hour	Thames Television (ITV)	special	1	herself	
1971	Birds on the Wing	BBC	serial	6	Samantha	

== Radio credits ==
Year	Production	On	Type	Episodes	Role	Ref
1963	FIVE-FIFTEEN	BBC Home Service	magazine	1	herself	
1970	Be My Guest	BBC Radio 2	talk radio	1	herself	
1971	Brothers in Law	BBC Radio 4	serial	24	Sally	
1974	Husband of the Year	BBC Radio 2	game show	1	herself (with her husband Ernest Clark)	
