= Boenisch =

Boenisch or Bönisch is a surname. Notable people with the surname include:

- Peter Boenisch (1927–2005), German columnist and journalist
- Peter M. Boenisch, German theatre researcher
- Sebastian Boenisch (born 1987), Polish footballer
- Yvonne Bönisch (born 1980), German judoka
