= Gilbert Barling =

English surgeon (1855–1940)

SirGilbert Barling Bt, CB, CBE, FRCS
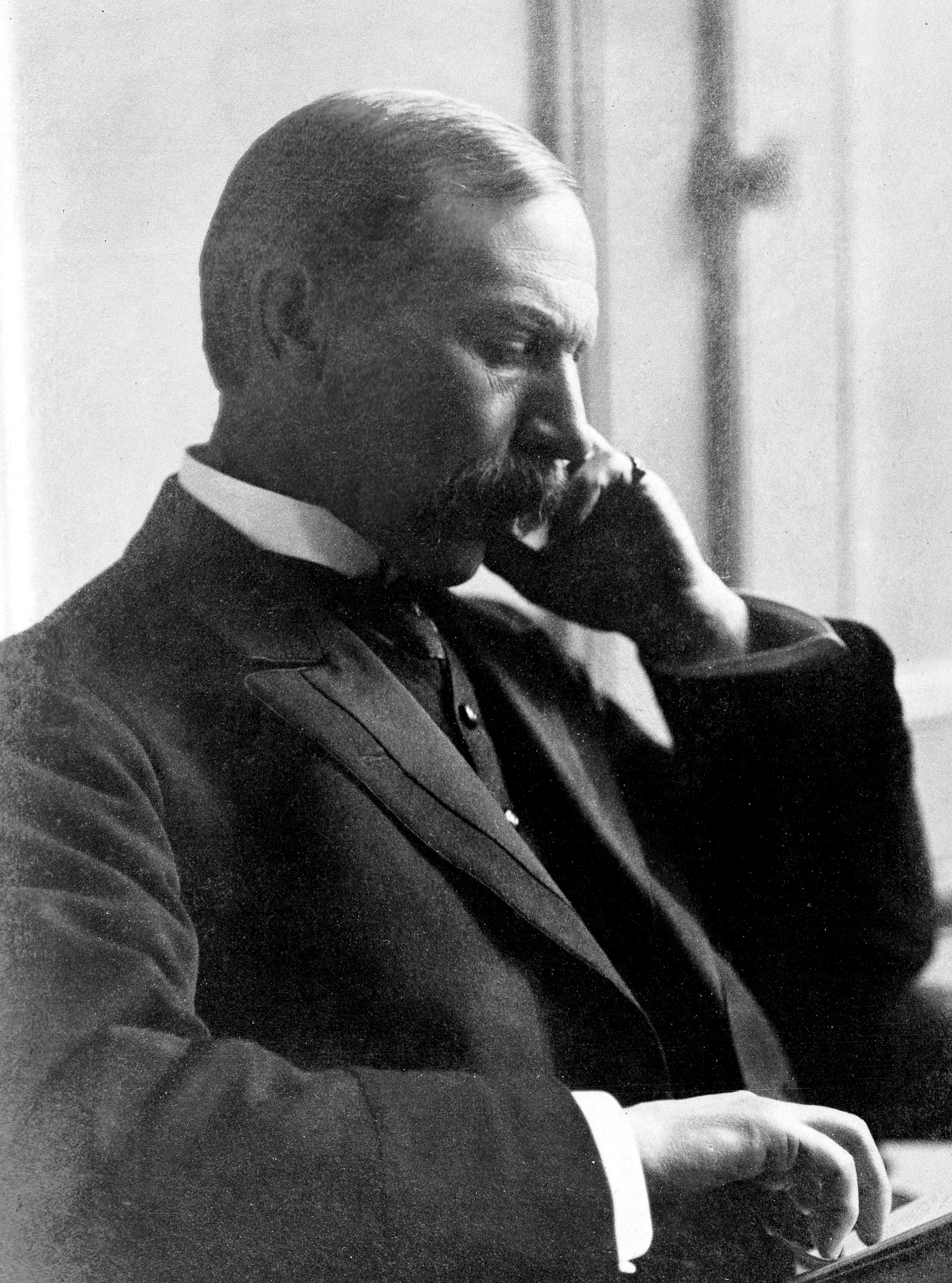
- Born: Harry Gilbert Barling; 30 April 1855; Newnham on Severn, Gloucestershire
- Died: 27 April 1940 (aged 84); Edgbaston

Sir Harry Gilbert Barling, 1st Baronet CB CBE FRCS (30 April 1855 – 27 April 1940) was an English surgeon.

== Life ==
Barling was born at Newnham on Severn, Gloucestershire and educated at a boarding school at Weston, near Bath. He went to Birmingham in 1875 at the age of 20, to take his matriculation exam at Queen's College, Birmingham (a predecessor college of Birmingham University), before going on to study at St Bartholomew's Hospital in London and culminating in his admittance to the Royal College of Surgeons in 1879, becoming a Fellow in 1881. It was at this time he was appointed resident pathologist at the General Hospital which would start an association lasting for 60 years. He became President of the hospital in 1925. He was awarded his M.B. degree in 1879 at St Bartholomew's, and his B.S. degree in 1883 at St Bartholomew's and Birmingham.

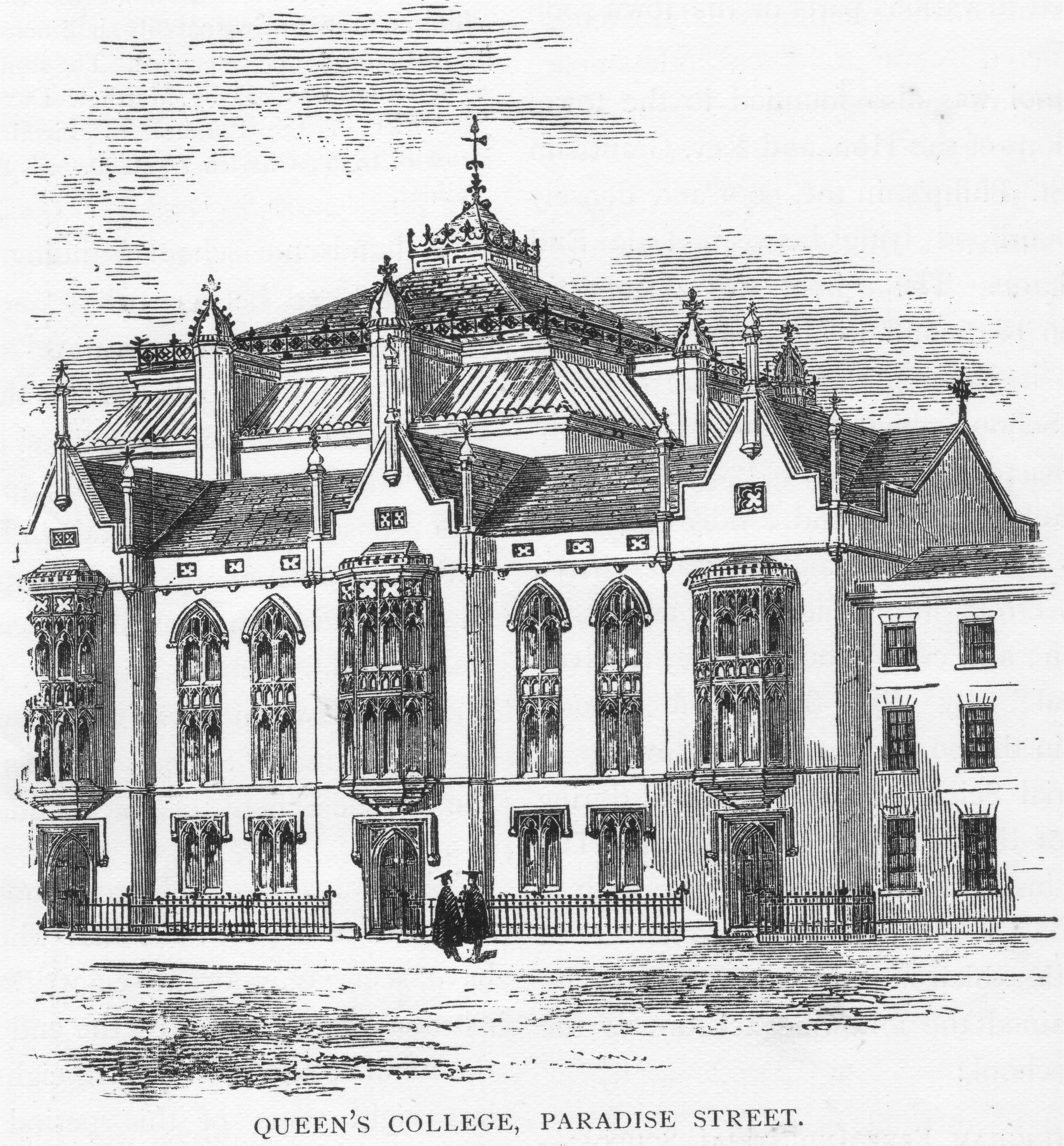
Queen's College, Birmingham, whose medical faculty later joined Mason College

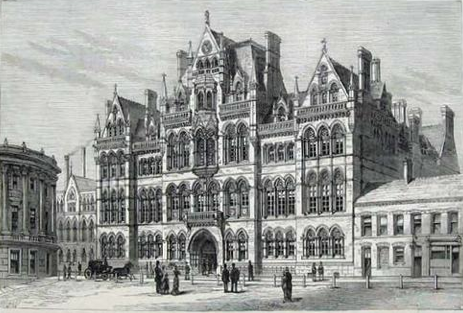
Mason College, now Birmingham University

In 1904, Barling was appointed Dean of the Faculty of Medicine at the University of Birmingham, succeeding Sir Bertram Windle, who was appointed president of Queen's College, Cork. From 1913 to 1933 he held the office of Vice Chancellor (renamed Pro-Chancellor in 1927) of the University of Birmingham, during which time and under his guidance the research departments in mental diseases and cancer were founded. He was Vice President and Chairman of the Council of The Birmingham Civic Society for 22 years from its creation in 1918 until his death in 1940. He was also for many years the Chairman of the Birmingham Hospital Saturday Fund. His association with the university had begun in 1885 when he was appointed Demonstrator of Anatomy at Queen's College and he was for many years on the teaching staff of the Medical School, becoming Professor of Pathology in 1885. In 1893 he was appointed co-professor of Surgery at Mason College (into which the medical faculty of Queen's College had merged and which later became Birmingham University) and Dean of the Faculty of Medicine.

At the outbreak of the First World War he was 59 and placed his services at the disposal of the Royal Army Medical Corps, acting as consulting surgeon in the Southern Command, subsequently being posted at the rank of colonel to the Western Front from October 1916 to August 1917. His service to King and Countrymen earned him the Companion of the Order of the Bath (CB) (military) in 1917 and in 1919 he was made a Commander of the Order of the British Empire (CBE). On 10 September 1919 King George V conferred upon him a Baronetcy and the College of Arms granted his Coat of Arms some three months later.

Escutcheon of the Barling baronets

In 1923 he had been involved in the setting up of the Birmingham Branch of the British Empire Cancer Campaign (now Cancer Research UK) and became its first Chairman. He was a hard worker and talented administrator and in 1936, in recognition of his hospital, university and other public service, he was presented with The Birmingham Civic Society's Gold Medal (a rare accolade given to those who have made a high contribution to life in Birmingham).

== Death ==
Sir Gilbert Barling chaired his last meeting of the Civic Society's Executive Council on 19 March 1940. He died from heart failure at his home (whilst in his garden) at 6 Manor Road, Edgbaston on Saturday 27 April 1940, just three days before his 85th birthday. At the next meeting of the Society's Executive Council, Mr Oliver Moreland temporarily assumed the Chair and it was agreed to send a letter of sympathy to Miss Edith Barling, one of his two daughters, who also sat on the Executive Council.

The funeral took place at St Augustine's Church, Edgbaston on Wednesday 1 May 1940. The Birmingham Mail reported that the eloquent testimony to the esteem in which Sir Gilbert was held was manifested at the funeral, which the Lord Mayor also attended. He had sat on the Church Council of this church for some years and often took sermons at the invitation of the vicar, indeed between 1868 and 1978 the vicarage of St Augustine's Church, Edgbaston was next door, at 4 Manor Road and is where his neighbour Dr Rosslyn Bruce lived between 1912 and 1923.

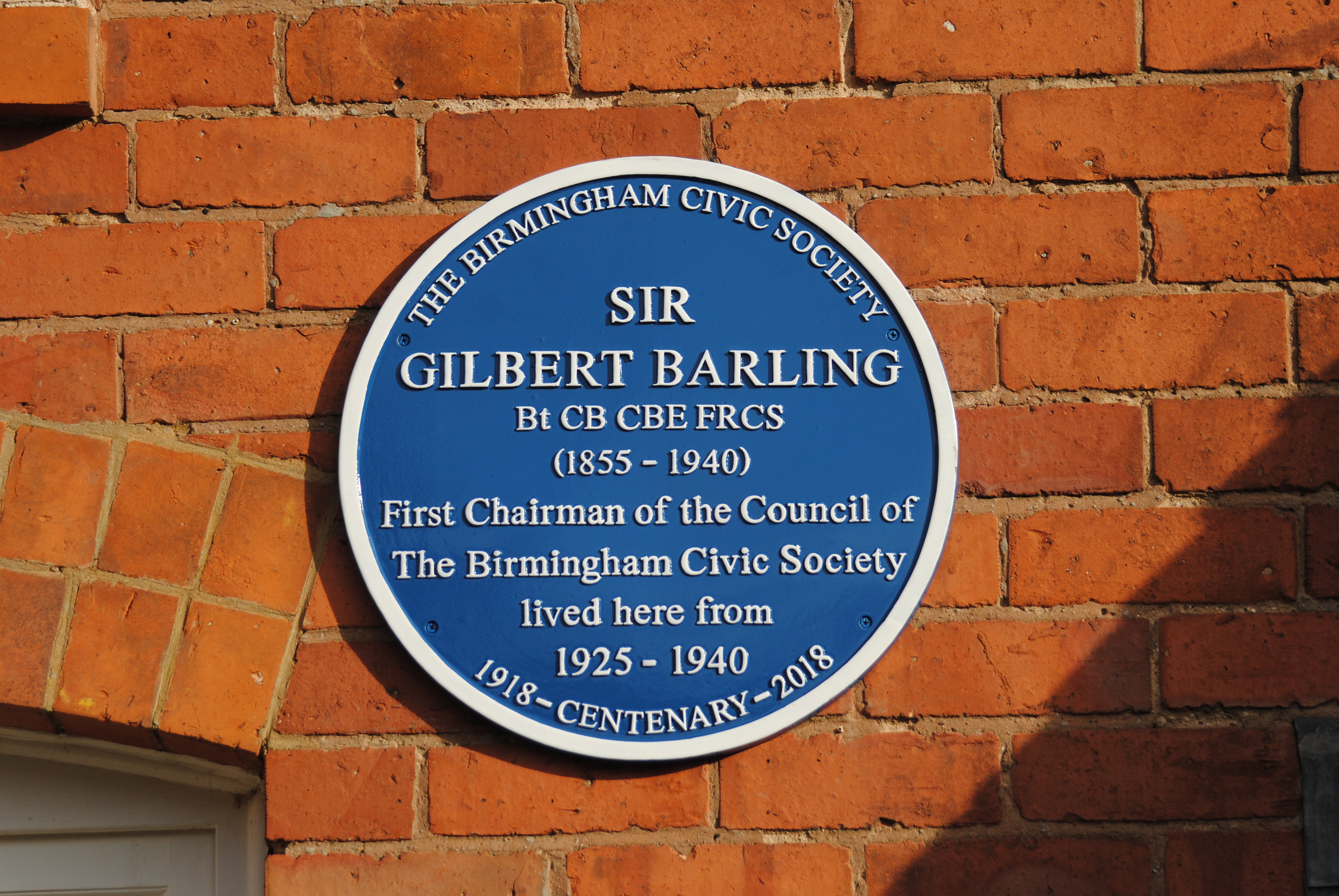
Blue Plaque

== Legacy ==
On 16 February 2018, The Birmingham Civic Society erected a Blue Plaque in Barling's honour, on his former home at 6, Manor Road, Edgbaston, Birmingham.

The papers of Gilbert Barling and also a collection of material relating to Barling, compiled by his daughter, Edith are housed at the University of Birmingham Special Collections.

== Sources ==
- L. G. Parsons (2004) ‘Barling, Sir (Harry) Gilbert, baronet (1855–1940)’, Oxford Dictionary of National Biography, Oxford University Press doi:10.1093/ref:odnb/30593
- The Birmingham Civic Society Annual Reports 1919–1940
- Minute Book of The Birmingham Civic Society 1940
- 50th Anniversary booklet of St Augustine's Church, Edgbaston published by The Reverend Dr Rosslyn Bruce 1918
- University of Birmingham archives
- St Augustine's Church Parish Magazine 1923.

Baronetage of the United Kingdom
| New creation | Baronet (of Edgbaston); 1919–1940 | Extinct |
