= Peter M. Boenisch =

German theatre researcher

Peter Michael Boenisch (born 1971) is a German theatre researcher. Since 2019, he had been Professor for Dramaturgy at Aarhus University (Denmark). In 2019, he was elected into the Academia Europaea.

== Biography ==
He read Theatre Studies, English Literature and Theoretical Linguistics at LMU Munich, where he worked, following his PhD, as an assistant professor for Dance and Performance from 2000. Between 2004 and 2018, he worked in the United Kingdom, initially at the University of Kent at Canterbury, and since then as Professor of European Theatre at the Royal Central School of Speech and Drama, University of London. With theatre scholars Patrice Pavis and Paul Allain, he founded the informal European Theatre Research Network (ETRN) at the University of Kent, intended to foster the exchange between Continental European and Anglophone theatre research and theatre practice. and to be the inter-institutional research centre of the University of Kent, the Royal Central School of Speech and Drama, and Aarhus University. In 2015/16, Boenisch was a Fellow at the research college Interweaving Performance Cultures, that was led between 2009 and 2019 at Free University of Berlin by senior German theatre scholar Erika Fischer-Lichte.

== Research ==
His more than 50 book chapters and essay concentrate on theatre direction and dramaturgy, mainly within the German- and Dutch-speaking theatre, and more recently on institutional contexts of theatre production in 21st century European theatre. He gained his PhD supervised by Christopher Balme on representations of movement and physicality in contemporary dance and theatre productions. His PhD was published, in German, in 2002, as körPERformance 1.0: Zur Theorie und Analyse von Körper- und Bewegungsdarstellungen im zeitgenössischen Theater. His 2015 study Directing Scenes and Senses: The Thinking of Regie (Manchester University Press 2015) maps the Continental European approach of 'directors' theatre' (Regietheater) by drawing a historical and conceptual comparison with the development of European philosophy (the main reference point is Hegel's dialectics). The book was awarded the 2nd Prize of the 2016 David Bradby Award for Research in International Theatre and Performance by the Theatre and Performance Research Association TAPRA. Between 2012 and 2015, funding by the British Academy and Leverhulme Trust enabled him to work together with German theatre director Thomas Ostermeier, resulting in their joint book The Theatre of Thomas Ostermeier (Routledge 2016). At Aarhus, he now leads the project Reconfiguring Dramaturgy for a Global Culture: Changing Practices in 21st century European Theatre, funded by the Aarhus University Foundation. Within that University's interdisciplinary research programme Cultural Transformations, he established the researcher group Paradigms of Dramaturgy: Arts, Institutions and the Social.

== Key publications ==
- (with Thomas Ostermeier) The Theatre of Thomas Ostermeier. Abingdon and New York: Routledge 2016. ISBN 978-1-13-891447-6 (paperback)/ 978-1-13-891446-9 (Hardback)
- Directing Scenes & Senses: The Thinking of Regie. Manchester: Manchester University Press 2015. ISBN 978-0-7190-9719-5 (hardback), ISBN 978-1-5261-2301-5 (paperback).
- (ed.), The Schaubühne Berlin under Thomas Ostermeier: Reinventing Realism. London and New York: Bloomsbury Methuen 2020. ISBN 978-1-350-16579-3 Hb./978-1-350-19070-2 Pb./978-1-350-16580-9 (Ebook).
- (ed.), Directors' Theatre, 2nd ed., David Bradby and David Williams, Macmillan Red Globe Press 2019. ISBN 9781352007978 Hb./ 9781352007947 Pb.
- (co-ed. with Clare Finburgh Delijani), The Great European Stage Directors, Vol. 6: Littlewood, Planchon, Strehler. Hg. der Reihe: Simon Shepherd. London: Bloomsbury Methuen 2018. ISBN 978-1-4742-5399-4.
- (co-ed with Lourdes Orozco) Border Collisions: Contemporary Flemish Theatre, Contemporary Theatre Review - Special Issue Vol. 20, No. 4, 2010, ISSN 1048-6801 print, ISSN 1477-2264 online.
- (co-ed. with Ric Allsopp), Bodiescapes. Performance Research Vol. 8, No. 2, London/New York: Routledge 2003. Pp. 144. ISBN 0-415-32131-X
- (co-ed. with Katharina Keim and Robert Braunmüller), Theater ohne Grenzen. München: Utz 2003. Pp. 504. ISBN 3-8316-0237-9
- körPERformance 1.0. Theorie und Analyse von Körper- und Bewegungsdarstellungen im zeitgenössischen Theater. München: ePodium 2002. Pp. 376. ISBN 3-9807394-6-5
