= Zenda (musical) =

- Original Cast Recording
- Music: Vernon Duke
- Lyrics: Lenny Adelson; Sid Kuller; Martin Charnin
- Book: Everett Freeman
- Basis: Anthony Hope's novel The Prisoner of Zenda
- Productions: 1963 Broadway cancelled

Zenda is a musical with a book by Everett Freeman, lyrics by Lenny Adelson, Sid Kuller, and Martin Charnin, and music by Vernon Duke.

== Premise ==
Based on the 1894 Anthony Hope novel The Prisoner of Zenda, it sets the action in contemporary times and transforms the protagonist into British song-and-dance man Richard Rassendyl, who is invited to perform at the wedding of Princess Flavia and King Rudolph of Zenda. Rassendyl unknowingly is related to the King due to his grandmother's romantic escapades years before, and when his royal highness is incapacitated by a general who wishes to seize power, look-alike Rassendyl is recruited to impersonate him. Complications ensue when the imposter finds himself attracted to the bride-to-be and the king's mistress Athena makes her presence known. Hope's original ending was changed to allow the two pairs of star-crossed lovers to live happily ever after.

== Production ==
Theatre producer Edwin Lester commissioned the project specifically for Alfred Drake, who had starred in his production of Kismet a decade earlier. Directed by George Schaefer and choreographed by Jack Cole, The scenery was designed by Harry Horner, costumes by Miles White. It began its pre-Broadway tryout on August 5, 1963 at the Curran Theatre in San Francisco, then continued to Los Angeles and Pasadena. In addition to Drake in the dual roles of Rassendyl and Rudolph, the cast included Anne Rogers as Flavia and Chita Rivera as Athena.

=== Set design ===
Scenically the production, designed by Harry Horner, was extremely involved with velour covered hard wall sets instead of typical muslin flats. The raised stage platform floor concealed tracks for the various platform wagon sets to be winched on and off stage. The village set, included left and right store facades with false perspective awnings, were stored, hanging in the off stage loft areas, allowing wing storage for the hard wall throne room (painted deep maroon color); a pink boudoir set; a garden set; and a Cathedral Rose stained glass window-wall with a central enlarged double Gothic arched doorway mounted on a six foot deep by thirty foot wide wagon platform. Staging the wedding scene, the couple began their walk at the rear of the stage on the Cathedral steps into the set. As the couple proceeded walking forward down to the foot-light apron, this massive Cathedral wall followed, moving with the couple to the middle of the stage. The audience never realized that the set was moving downstage with the performers. When the couple turned around, returning upstage, the cathedral wall slowly returned to the back wall position ending the wedding scene. This set wagon wall flew out and was stored against the Curran's stage back wall. In Los Angeles, this set piece was replaced with a painted velour framed backing. Harry Horner matched Miles White's costume color, for Princess Flavia's dressing gown robe, spraying the velour boudoir walls the identical costume's pink color. During rehearsals, White was angry with Horner because only the actress' head could be seen against the identical pink background.

The production required a large staff of stage technicians, flymen, and property crew for the major set changes. During the construction of the stage sets, the shop's minimum construction floor space limited and hindered by space for constructing all the wagon sets. The Light Opera rented film stages at the nearby (closed) Allied Artist Studios, located off Sunset Boulevard (KCET TV purchased the property afterwards). Only six blocks travel, carpenters and scenic artists assembled the scenery in two stages at the old film lot. Preparing the dry tint powder base paint for the throne room set, the Scenic charge man did not calculate the correct amount of "horse glue" binder for the dark maroon paint. Spraying the cream velour covered flats, after drying, the paint did not properly adhere to the velour flats. The paint flaked and stained the stage technicians' hands. Each piece of scenery had to have a muslin case for shipping, keeping the finish from marking and affecting the other pieces of scenery. When this set was handled, each stage technician had to wear gloves when the set was moved into place, or shifted off stage for storage. This set remained a problem throughout the tour. Another folding dimensional scenic arch unit, which had been intended to fold open, and collapse when flown into grid storage position returning into the loft storage areas, became an engineering nightmare. The scenic element, abandoned after two weeks, was replaced by a flat profile garden arch.

== Reception and failed Broadway transfer ==
Reviews in all three cities ranged from mixed to positive, and the box office takes were promising.

Variety claimed the musical in San Francisco was "good and can become first rate."

When Schaefer, who felt the show wasn't ready for Broadway, invited Samuel A. Taylor to revise the book, Freeman objected, claiming the problems lay not with his work but Schaefer's direction. One inherent problem that didn't exist in any of the film adaptations, and which neither writing nor staging could resolve, was Drake's inability to appear as both Rassendyl and Rudolph at the same time. (This did not appear to be a problem in the novel's first dramatisation in 1896; The Prisoner of Zenda opened as a play in the London's West End, co-written by the novel's author and a playwright called Edward Rose.) Schaefer quit the project and Drake quickly followed. The scheduled November 26 opening at the Mark Hellinger Theatre was cancelled, and the project never was revived.

== Song list ==
- Bounce!
- No More Love
- My Royal Majesty
- When You Stop and Think
- Now the World Begins Again
- Zenda
- A Whole Lot of Happy
- He Wouldn't Dare
- The Man Loves Me
- My Son-in-law the King
- A Royal Confession
- I Wonder What He Meant by That
- Yesterday's Forgotten
- Let Her Not Be Beautiful
- Breakfast for Two
- No Ifs! No Ands! No Buts!
- My Heart Has Come A-tumbling Down
- Love is the Worst Possible Thing
- Enchanting Girls
- Words Words Words!
- You are All That's Beautiful
- A Whole Lot of Happy (Reprise)
- Let Her Not Be Beautiful (Reprise)
