= Performance science =

Multidisciplinary study of human performance

Performance science is the multidisciplinary study of human performance. It draws together methodologies across numerous scientific disciplines, including those of biomechanics, economics, physiology, psychology, and sociology, to understand the fundamental skills, mechanisms, and outcomes of performance activities and experiences. It carries implications for various domains of skilled human activity, often performed under extreme stress and/or under the scrutiny of audiences or evaluators. These include performances across the arts, sport, education, and business, particularly those occupations involving the delivery of highly trained skills such as in surgery and management. Advancements in performance sciences aim to uplift aspects of performance by creating strategies to improve health, education, and overall well being.

== Contribution of Performance ==
The four thematic areas of performance sciences are recognized across all fields and include context, execution, foundation, and preparation. Context involves the historical, societal, and cultural aspects that have been involved in the area where performance is required. Performance execution includes the interaction with others involved such as teammates, coaches, audiences, and opponents, as well as the delivery. Foundation of performance starts with each individuals own abilities and differences in skill. Preparation for performances are in teaching and learning.

== Centers of research and teaching ==
- USC Performance Science Institute, University of Southern California
- 711th Human Performance Wing, Wright-Patterson Air Force Base
- Centre for Performance Science, a partnership of the Royal College of Music and Imperial College London
- Performance and Science Working Group, Theatre and Performance Research Association
- Performance Science Unit, Sports Institute for Northern Ireland

== See also ==
- Environmental psychology
- Industrial and organizational psychology
- Military psychology
- Music psychology
- Sport psychology
