= No Kidding (film) =

1960 British comedy by Gerald Thomas

- Original British quad poster
- Directed by: Gerald Thomas
- Written by: Verily Anderson; Robin Estridge; Norman Hudis
- Produced by: Peter Rogers
- Starring: Leslie Phillips; Geraldine McEwan; Joan Hickson
- Cinematography: Alan Hume
- Edited by: John Shirley
- Music by: Bruce Montgomery
- Production company: Peter Rogers Productions
- Distributed by: Anglo-Amalgamated Film Distributors
- Release date: 1960
- Running time: 86 minutes
- Country: United Kingdom
- Language: English

No Kidding (U.S. title: Beware of Children) is a 1960 British comedy film directed by Gerald Thomas featuring Leslie Phillips, Geraldine McEwan and Irene Handl, Noel Purcell and Julia Lockwood. The film is adapted from the book Beware of Children, a 1958 memoir by Verily Anderson, who also wrote the screenplay.

== Plot ==
David and Catherine Robinson have inherited a large but rundown country house. David suggests they now have room to increase their family beyond their son, but, after a number of his previous business ventures have failed, his wife demurs. However, she does agree to his idea to use the house as a summer holiday home for the children of the wealthy. By advertising in The Times, they attract a number of customers, and hire a matron and a cook, but immediately fall foul of a local councillor, Mrs Spicer, who wants the local authority to compulsorily purchase the house for a project of her own.

The children arrive, and while some are polite, scared and helpful, others are wild, spoilt, and rebellious, including an American brother and sister, and an English girl who insists (falsely) that she has been maltreated by her parents.

As the children grow increasingly ill-disciplined, the Robinsons and the staff struggle to keep them under control. David advocates a tough approach, while Catherine believes that the children should be allowed their freedom, but they are both undermined by a cook who is drunk most of the time.

After an illicit midnight trip out to a nearby café, the children are grounded for two days. Then the Robinsons hear that the local council is sending an inspector, who may close them down if they fail the test. They rally the staff and children, who all behave correctly when the inspector and Mrs Spicer visit.

When the time arrives for the children's parents to come to collect them, David tells them that the children are refusing to leave unless their parents promise to spend more time with them and not send them away to holiday homes and boarding schools. After the parents agree, all the children depart. Impressed by what she has seen, Mrs Spicer says she will no longer oppose the holiday home business. When their son protests at having lost his playmates, Catherine tells David that perhaps they should now have more children of their own.

== Cast ==
- Leslie Phillips as David Robinson
- Geraldine McEwan as Catherine Robinson
- Julia Lockwood as Fenella / "Vanilla"
- Irene Handl as Mrs Spicer
- Noel Purcell as Tandy
- Joan Hickson as Cook
- June Jago as Matron
- Cyril Raymond as Colonel Matthews
- Esma Cannon as District Nurse
- Alan Gifford as Edgar Treadgold
- Sydney Tafler as Mr Rockbottom
- Brian Oulton as Vicar
- Eric Pohlmann as King
- Patricia Jessel as Queen
- Brian Rawlinson as Will
- Michael Sarne as Henri
- Joy Shelton as Mrs Rockbottom
- Earl Cameron as Black father
- Pearl Prescod as Black mother
- Peter Howell as father of Angus
- Marion Mathie as Helen Treadgold
- Peggy Simpson as mother of Angus
- Noel Hood as Vicar's wife
- Cyril Chamberlain as Cafe proprietor
- Christopher Witty as Richard Robinson
- Martin Stephens as Angus
- Francesca Annis as Priscilla
- Haydn Evans as Lionel Rockbottom
- Michael Gowdy as Dandy Big Treadgold
- Janet Bradbury (as Jeanette Bradbury) as Dandy Little Treadgold
- Keith Lacey as Hassan
- Mark Milleham as Suleiman
- Millicent Kerr as Eileen
- Louise Redman as Margaret

== Critical reception ==
The Monthly Film Bulletin wrote: "A rag-bag of hackneyed situations thrown together with an almost demented lack of consequence, No Kidding shifts the basis of the Peter Rogers-Gerald Thomas brand of comedy from slapstick to sentiment, losing pace, construction and edge in the process. A piquant Geraldine McEwan and a subdued Leslie Phillips do what they can to bolster up the more limp and feeble aspects of the plot, but the film remains little more than a calculated tug at the sloppiest of heart-strings."

The film has been interpreted by film scholar Wheeler Dixon as "a gentle critique" of A. S. Neill's Summerhill School theories, published in America in the same year as the film's release.

Harrison's Reports gave it a good review, calling it an "uneven but well-enacted comedy by the 'Carry On ...' series film-makers ... Unobjectionable for all."
