= David Bradby =

British drama & theatre academic (1942–2011)

- Born: David Henry Bradby; 27 February 1942; Kollupitiya, Colombo, Sri Lanka
- Died: 17 January 2011 (aged 68); London, UK
- Education: Rugby School; Trinity College, Oxford; University of Bristol; University of Glasgow
- Occupation(s): Drama and theatre academic
- Spouse: Rachel Anderson (m. 1965)
- Children: 4

David Bradby (27 February 1942 – 17 January 2011) was a British drama and theatre academic with particular research interests in French theatre, Modernist / Postmodernist theatre, the role of the director and the Theatre of the Absurd. He wrote extensively on the theatre of Samuel Beckett, Roger Planchon, Jacques Lecoq, Arthur Adamov among many others. He also translated several works, principally by Michel Vinaver, Jacques Lecoq and Bernard-Marie Koltès.

== Life ==
Born in Kollupitiya in Colombo, Sri Lanka, where his father was principal of a teacher-training college, Bradby was educated at Rugby School in Rugby, England, where "he developed a passion for directing plays, taking over the production of light comedy from his English master". He originally studied Modern Languages at Trinity College, Oxford, but started to develop an interest in the theatre. During his time as a language assistant in Lyon, Bradby became a bit-part actor in Roger Planchon's theatre company.

Bradby's subsequent education saw him taking a postgraduate teaching course at the University of Bristol, and then a PhD on the playwright Arthur Adamov at the University of Glasgow.

His academic career included the founding of the Department of Drama at the University of Kent in 1970, as well as work with the British Council in Nigeria. He developed the first colloquium on popular film and theatre, featuring contributions from the British theatre director Max Stafford-Clark. Bradby was appointed head of the Department of Drama at the University of Caen, Normandy, before moving to Royal Holloway, University of London, in 1988, where he also took the position of department head. He retired in Summer 2007.

Bradby edited the Cambridge University Press "Studies in Modern Drama" series, as well as the journal Contemporary Theatre Review. His 1988 book Directors’ Theatre, co-written with David Williams, had "a defining influence on younger British innovators such as Katie Mitchell and Simon McBurney."

He was Professor Emeritus of Drama and Theatre at Royal Holloway. He gave many public lectures and broadcasts and was also a consultant and advisor to many productions of works by Jean Genet, Molière, Michel Vinaver and Bernard-Marie Koltès.

In 1997, Bradby was made a Chevalier des Arts et des Lettres by the French government in recognition of his contribution to the study of French culture. Bradby had been married to the author Rachel Anderson since 1965. He died aged 68 on 17 January 2011. A celebration of his life and work was held in and around the Department of Drama & Theatre at Royal Holloway on Sunday, 5 June 2011.

Awards named after Bradby are given out annually by the Theatre and Performance Research Association and the Standing Conference of University Drama Departments.

== Bibliography ==
- Samuel Beckett: Waiting for Godot (2001)
- Mise en Scène: French Theatre Now (with Annie Sparks) (1997)
- The Theater of Michel Vinaver (1993)
- Modern French Drama 1940–1990 (1991)
- Le Théâtre Français Contemporain (1990)
- Directors' Theatre (with David Williams) (1988)
- The Theatre of Roger Planchon (1984)
- Modern French Drama 1940–1980 (1984)
- Studying Drama (with K. Pickering and P. Thomas) (1984)
- People's Theatre (with John McCormick) (1978)
- Adamov (1975)
- The Paris Jigsaw: Internationalism and the City's Stages (ed. with Maria M. Delgado) (2002)
- Morality and Justice: The Challenge of European Theatre (2001)
- Renard the Fox (with Rachel Anderson) (1986)
- Performance and Politics in Popular Drama (ed. with Louis James and Bernard Sharratt) (1982)

=== As editor ===
- Eric-Emmanuel Schmitt: Plays I (2002)
- Frontline Drama 6: New French Plays (1998)
- Bernard-Marie Koltès: Plays I (1997)
- Michel Vinaver: Plays I; Plays II. (1997).
- Michel Vinaver: Théâtre de Chambre (1995)
- Landmarks of French Classical Drama (1991)
- New French Plays (with C. Schumacher) (1989)
- Kean (1973)
