= Donald Clive Anderson =

English military consultant and historian (1897–1957)

- Born: 18 April 1897; Cookham, England
- Died: 2 January 1957 (aged 59)
- Occupations: Military consultant and historian
- Spouse: Verily Bruce (m. 1940)
- Children: 5, including Rachel Anderson and Janie Hampton

Captain Donald Clive Anderson (18 April 1897 – 2 January 1957) was an English military consultant and historian. He joined the British Indian Army before fighting in the Mesopotamia and Palestine in World War I. Anderson toured Australia before working in Sudan on The Four Feathers film in 1939, working for the Ministry of Information during World War II, and following the war working on Festival of Britain.

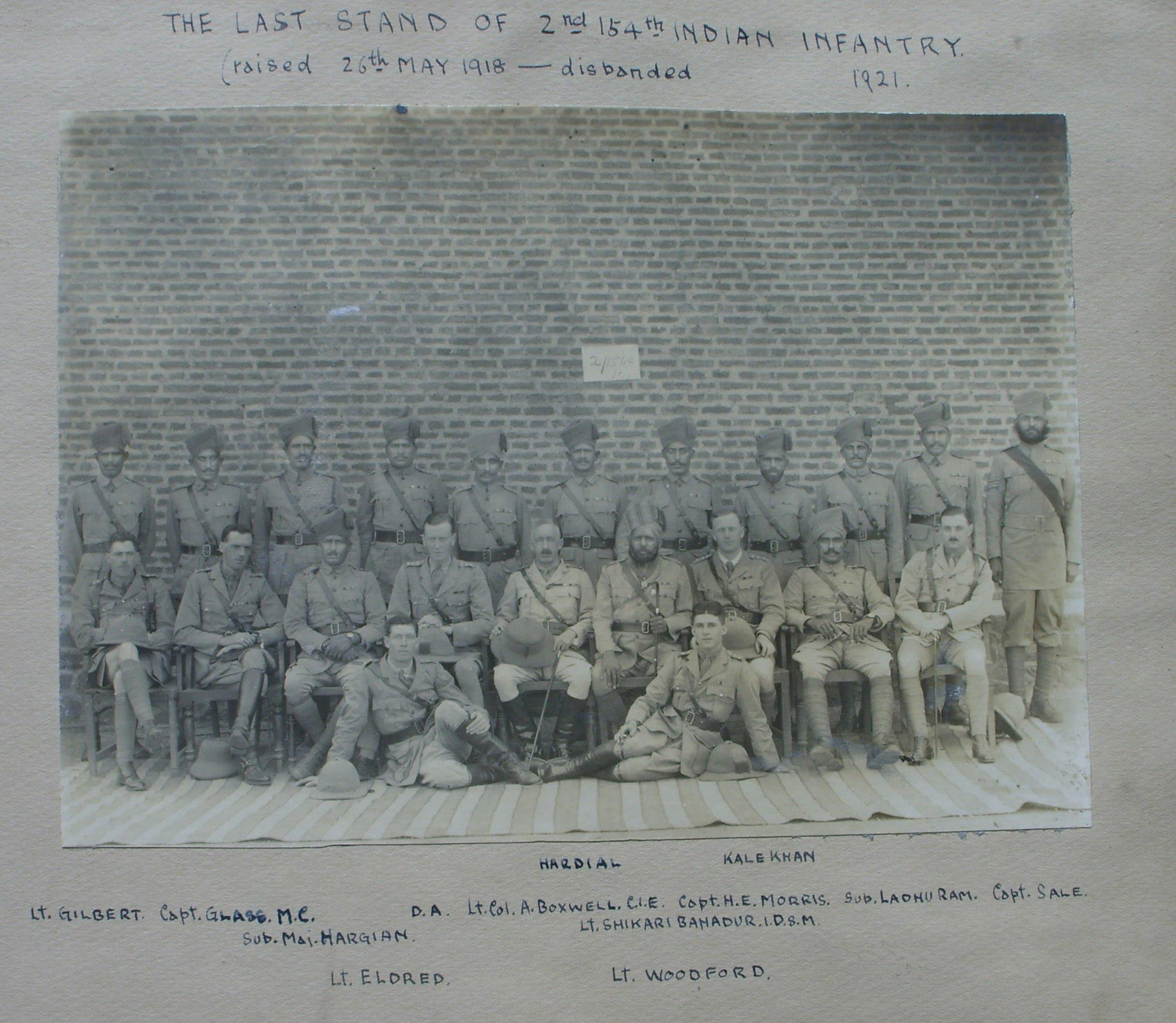
Anderson with the last stand of the 2nd 154th Indian Infantry, raised 26 May 1918, disbanded 1921. Lt Gilbert, Captain Glass MC, Sub Major Hargian, Lt Eldred, Lt Col A Boxwell CIE, Captain HE Morris, Hardial, Kale Khan, Lt Shikari Banadur IDSM, Lt Shikari Bahanur IDSM, Lt Woodford, Sub Ladnu Ram, Captain Sale.

== Early life ==
Donald Anderson was born in Cookham, England. He probably attended the Quetta cadet college. He was commissioned on to the Unattached List, British Indian Army on 15 November 1915, was admitted to the British Indian Army on 18 November and was attached to 122nd Rajputana Infantry. The regiment was stationed in India at Kohat until late 1916, entraining on 1 November 1916, embarking on 3 November 1916 and landing at Basra, Mesopotamia, on 8 November 1916. He was promoted lieutenant on 15 November 1916. In early 1918 a company was detached from the regiment and sent to Palestine to form part of a new unit, the 2nd battalion, 154th Indian Infantry. On 31 May 1918, he was posted to 2nd battalion, 154th Indian Infantry as well, being made Adjutant on 9 June 1918. The regiment formed part of 233rd Brigade, 75th Division and fought in Palestine. He held the rank of acting Captain commanding a company from 28 May 1917 to 24 September 1917, 24 September 1917 to 20 November 1917 and from 17 February 1918 to 14 November 1918.

He remained in the British Indian Army after the war, being promoted Captain on 15 November 1919 but retired on 15 March 1923 under the terms of the Royal Warrant of 25 April 1923, owing to the reduction of the Indian Army.

After the war, Anderson returned to Britain, visiting family in Guernsey in 1920.

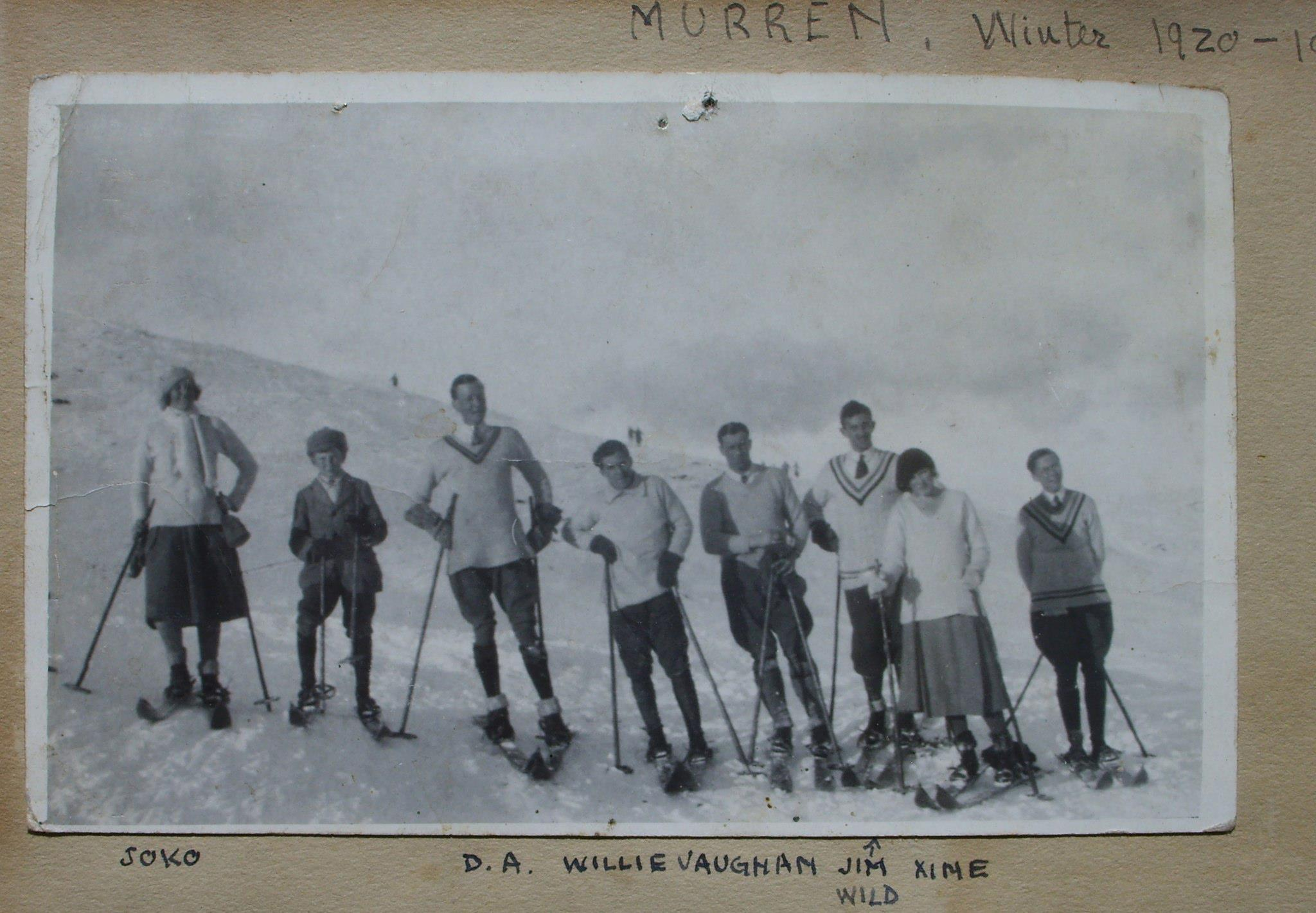
Anderson skiing with Wellie Vaughan, Jim Wild, Xine, Soko, in Mürren, Switzerland, Winter 1920–21

An early skier, Anderson spent the winter of 1920–21 in Switzerland in Mürren, the town where the famous Kandahar Ski Club was set up in 1924. The name for the club is said to be named after the "Roberts of Kandahar-Cup" first run in 1911. During the 1880 Afghanistan War, Lord Roberts won a battle in Kandahar.

From Malcolm Uren, editor of The Western Mail, Perth, WA, To Donald Anderson, Australian Specialist, Ministry of Information, 1944.

In early 1921, Anderson sailed to Australia on the P&O ship SS Macedonia and returned to England in the early 1930s.

While in Australia, Anderson visited Il Parran, Glenn Innes (1923), Hobart (August 1924), visiting Amy Gant, Anderson's mother's first cousin wife of Tetley Gant, member of the Tasmanian Legislative Council.

In 1924, with C. L. Morell, Anderson toured several stations in the Northern Territory and Queensland – Barclay Downs, Lawn Hill Station, Alexandra – before returning through Goondiwindi and Pukawidgi near Inverell in 1925.

== Career ==
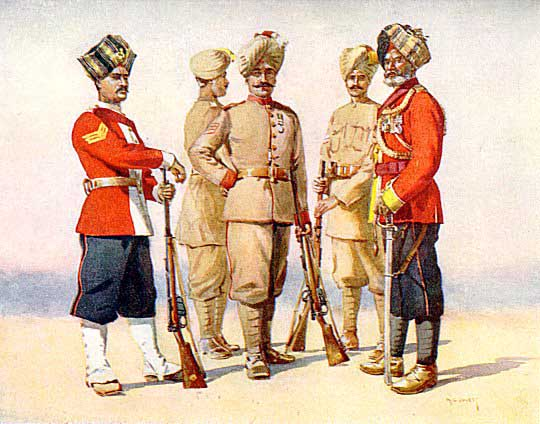
A painting depicting members of the Rajputana Rifles, of all ranks and uniforms. c. 1911

Anderson was the military consultant for the 1939 film The Four Feathers directed by Zoltan Korda, starring John Clements, Ralph Richardson, June Duprez and C. Aubrey Smith. Anderson ensured the accuracy of the military uniforms and procedure in England and Sudan. During filming, he dressed as a Sudanese tribesman and led the charge of Khalifa's cavalry.

During World War II, Anderson worked for the Ministry of Information using experience gained in the making of the Four Feathers. He was also the Australian specialist for the Ministry because of his time spent in Australia.

After the war, Anderson worked as Chief Press Officer for the Festival of Britain in London, 1951.

== Shakespeare ==
In the 1930s, Anderson researched the idea that William Shakespeare may have been written by Edward de Vere, 17th Earl of Oxford, and was a friend of John Thomas Looney.

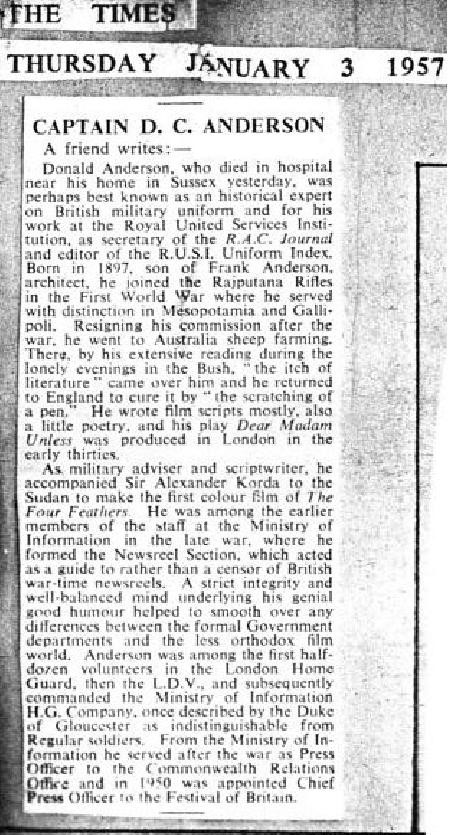
A scan of D. C. Anderson's obituary from The Times

== Published work ==
Journal of the Society for Army Historical Research, Spring 1953. Vol. XXXI. No. 125. McGuffie, T. H., ed. (L. E. Buckell, Major G. Tylden, Major P. Young, W. Y. Carman, Dr. F. Herrmann, C. C. P. Lawson, Major J. H. Busby, C. T. Atkinson, S. H. Ward, Major N. P. Dawnay, G. O. Rickword, Captain D. C. Anderson, Captain R. A. Ingham Clark, et al.). Published by Society for Army Historical Research, London, 1953.

== Family ==
His father was Frank Anderson, the Chief Surveyor of West Africa, and architect of Lagos government buildings, prison and lighthouse in Nigeria. Donald had one brother and two sisters, Joko and Christine. His brother Patrick died in an aeroplane crash while in the Royal Flying Corps on 19 October 1917, aged 18; he was based at Waddington, Turnhouse and Midlothian.

Anderson married English author Verily Bruce in 1940. They had five children, including the writer Rachel Anderson and the writer and health activist Janie Hampton.

Anderson died in hospital near his home in Sussex on 2 January 1957, aged 59.
