= Birds on the Wing =

1971 British TV sitcom

- Genre: Sitcom
- Written by: Peter Yeldham
- Directed by: Graeme Muir
- Starring: Richard Briers; Julia Lockwood; Anne Rogers
- Composers: Mike Sammes; Dennis Wilson
- Country of origin: United Kingdom
- Original language: English
- No. of series: 1
- No. of episodes: 6

Production
- Producer: Graeme Muir
- Running time: 30 minutes
- Production company: BBC

Original release
- Network: BBC 2
- Release: 11 June – 16 July 1971

Birds on the Wing is a 1971 British comedy television series that originally aired in a single series of six episodes on BBC 2. A businessman becomes enamoured of an attractive young woman, who he finds out is trying to con him with her friend. The three form an unlikely alliance. The series is a crime comedy.

== Production ==
Peter Yeldham wrote the television series, which is adapted from his eponymous 1970 West End play. Graeme Muir was the producer.

== Main cast ==
- Richard Briers as Charles Jackson
- Julia Lockwood as Samantha
- Anne Rogers as Elizabeth

== Reception ==
Patrick Campbell of The Stage and Television Today wrote of the first episode that "the storyline hardly taxes the intellect" and "the pace of direction and the timing of performance were more those of comedy and this, in fact, is what the episode turned out to be". In a positive review, the Liverpool Daily Post said the series had "lively dialogue and the pace of a Brian Rix farce". The reviewer concluded that "it was old fashioned in the way that the Aldwych farce are old fashioned".

== Bibliography ==
- Wagg, Stephen. Because I Tell a Joke or Two: Comedy, Politics and Social Difference. Routledge, 2004.
