= Please Turn Over =

1959 British film by Gerald Thomas

- Directed by: Gerald Thomas
- Written by: Norman Hudis; Basil Thomas (play)
- Produced by: Peter Rogers
- Starring: Ted Ray; Leslie Phillips; Julia Lockwood
- Cinematography: Edward Scaife
- Edited by: John Shirley
- Music by: Bruce Montgomery
- Color process: Black and white
- Production company: Beaconsfield Productions
- Distributed by: Anglo-Amalgamated Film Distributors
- Release date: December 1959
- Running time: 87 minutes
- Country: United Kingdom
- Language: English

Please Turn Over (P.T.O.) is a 1959 British comedy film directed by Gerald Thomas and starring Ted Ray, Julia Lockwood, Jean Kent, Joan Sims, Leslie Phillips, Charles Hawtrey, Lionel Jeffries, June Jago and Victor Maddern. It was written by Norman Hudis based on the 1959 play Book of the Month by Basil Thomas and produced by Peter Rogers. An English town is thrown into chaos when the daughter of one of the residents publishes a book detailing the supposed secrets of the inhabitants.

== Plot ==
In a quiet English town, seventeen-year-old Jo Halliday lives a fairly boring life working as a hairdresser and living at home, with her mother, father, and fitness-obsessed aunt. Her father, an accountant, continually wishes that his dreamy, untidy daughter could be more like his secretary, Millicent Jones.

One morning, the local newspaper reveals that Jo has written a book—Naked Revolt—which is an instant bestseller. It tells the story of a teenage girl who discovers the shocking truth about her family and neighbours.

The town's residents believe the book to be a true portrait of the family. Her father finds himself under suspicion at work; his boss personally audits his books, fearing he has been embezzling money for a secret girlfriend with expensive tastes. Her mother is thought to be engaged in a twenty-year affair of her own with the retired army officer who gives her driving lessons and is Jo's real father. A local doctor is portrayed as a philanderer who is sexually involved with a number of his patients while ignoring the desperate advances of his drunken assistant, Jo's aunt. In fact, none of this is true: her father is scrupulously honest and in love with her mother, the local doctor is a shy man, and the former army officer is simply a family friend.

Robert Hughes, a successful young playwright, contacts her about turning her book into a play. Jo is enthusiastic, but knows nothing about royalties, so he takes her to London to meet with his agent. After discovering they are kindred spirits, the two become engaged.

When they return home, Jo is confronted by her angry family and neighbours. The doctor is threatening to sue, and her father and mother have begun questioning each other's fidelity, but when the father hears of the doctor's planned lawsuit, he rises to her defense, stating that he approves of her talent, if not her methods. Aunt Gladys tells the doctor of her unrequited love for him, and they become a couple. All is well, until Jo reveals she is planning to write another book.

== Cast ==
- Ted Ray as Edward Halliday
- Jean Kent as Janet Halliday
- Leslie Phillips as Dr. Henry Manners
- Joan Sims as Beryl, maid
- Julia Lockwood as Jo Halliday
- Tim Seely as Robert Hughes, playwright
- Charles Hawtrey as jewellery salesman
- Dilys Laye as Miss Millicent Jones, secretary
- Lionel Jeffries as Ian Howard, driving instructor
- June Jago as Gladys Worth, aunt
- Colin Gordon as Maurice
- Joan Hickson as saleswoman
- Victor Maddern as man at station
- Ronald Adam as Mr. Appleton
- Cyril Chamberlain as Mr. Jones
- Marianne Stone as Mrs. Waring
- Anthony Sagar as barman
- Lee Patterson as Rod
- Myrtle Reed as Dr.Manners' seductive patient

== Reception ==
The Monthly Film Bulletin wrote: "Though the complementary plot-within-a-plot construction of this stage farce aims its satire at middle-class life, precocious writers and current fashions in writing, the material is for the most part rather thin and uncinematic. Several of the characters, too, fail to come off, though Joan Sims is enjoyable in the small role of a daily help, and Lionel Jeffries extracts the maximum amount of comedy from a driving lesson scene." (Hudis included a similar driving scene in his 1963 film Nurse on Wheels.)

The Radio Times Guide to Films gave the film 3/5 stars, writing: "Notwithstanding its Carry On credentials, this gentle comedy of embarrassment could not be further from the bawdy humour of the celebrated series. Adapted by Norman Hudis, it boasts Leslie Phillips, Joan Sims and Charles Hawtrey among those aghast at the revelations contained in a potboiling novel populated by local luminaries. It's a one-joke affair, but director Gerald Thomas ensures the cast keeps it light and frothy."

Kine Weekly called it a "money maker" at the British box office in 1960.
