= Departure (1986 film) =

- Directed by: Brian Kavanagh
- Written by: Michael Gurr
- Based on: play A Pair of Claws by Michael Gurr
- Starring: Sean Scully; Patricia Kennedy; Serge Lazareff; June Jago
- Music by: Bruce Smeaton
- Release date: 1986
- Running time: 95 mins
- Country: Australia
- Language: English
- Budget: A$1.8 million

Departure (also known as A Pair of Claws) is a 1986 Australian film directed by Brian Kavanagh.

== Plot ==
A married couple decide to move to Rome and spend a final weekend in Australia.

== Cast ==
- Sean Scully as Bowen
- Patricia Kennedy as Sylvia Swift
- Serge Lazareff as Simon Swift
- June Jago as Frances
- Joan Sydney
- Michael Duffield as Presley Swift

== Production ==
Brian Kavanagh said he was originally offered to edit the film and then was asked to direct when the original director left. In an interview, he said, "The producers were hopeful of producing a series of Australian plays on film, similar to the American Film Theatre Programme. A good idea actually. Pity it never took off."

Kavangh said the film was "a few days away from shooting at a location in Eltham when we discovered the producers had no money. The project was shut down and I took legal action against them. Not so much as to gain my contracted salary, but I was seriously annoyed at people who had no film experience, who came into our industry and created havoc."

A year later the producer secured finance and filming started in Hobart in part because the owner of a local film studio invested in the film. Kavanagh said, "During the down time, I restructured the script with Michael Gurr to open it out as much as I could from the one location, setting the elderly couple who were about to be involved in a political scandal, to a 'no man’s land' in a hotel, prior to leaving the country." It was shot in Hobart and Richmond in Tasmania.

== Reception ==
Kavanagh said "There was interest at Cannes from several US distributors but the film was badly handled by the sales agent and never really got the distribution it deserved. I’m proud of it and it was wonderful to work with such a talented cast."
