= Malcolm Uren =

Australian journalist

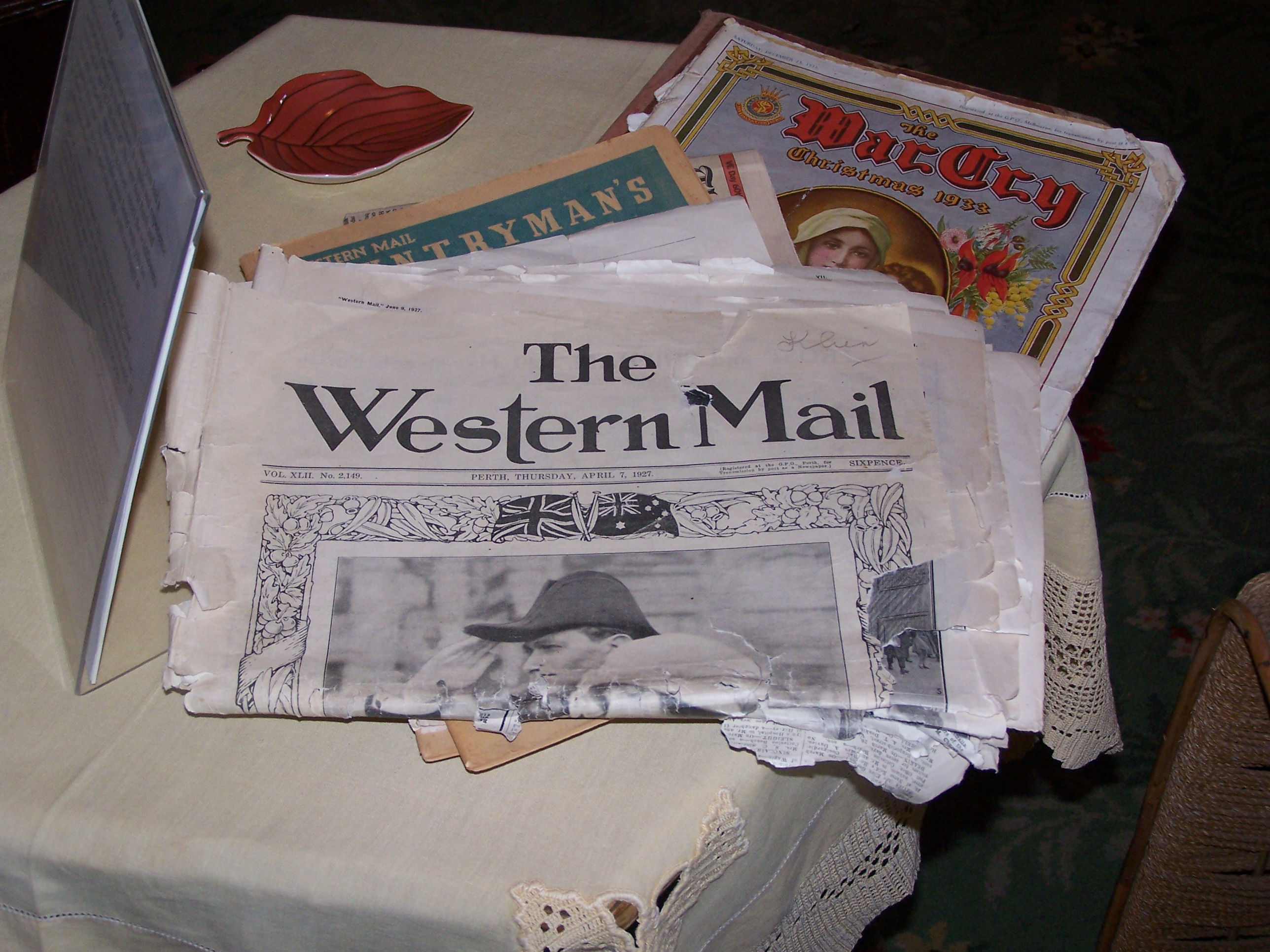
7 April 1927 edition, with the Countryman behind

Malcolm John Leggoe Uren, OBE (7 January 1900 – 22 July 1973) was an Australian journalist who edited the Western Mail in Western Australia.

== Early life ==
Uren was born on 7 January 1900 in West Hindmarsh, an inner-city suburb in Adelaide, South Australia to Malcolm Francis Uren and Millicent Jane Leggoe. The Uren family then moved to Perth, the capital of Western Australia. Uren married Lenora Emily Olive Stradwick (Klenk) on 25 August 1923. They had a son, Malcolm Charles Uren (Bon) (1924–2002) and four grandchildren, Leslie (1948) and Malcolm John Spencer (1951–2004), and Robin (1963) and John (1965).

== Career ==
Uren became a cadet journalist with the Perth-based Western Mail in 1920, and by 1941 was its editor.

From Malcolm Uren, Editor of The Western Mail Perth, WA, To Donald Clive Anderson, Australian Specialist, Ministry of Information, 1944.

== Later life ==
In 1965 Uren was appointed an Officer of the Order of the British Empire. He died on 22 July 1973.

== Published works ==
- (1945) Sailormen's Ghosts: The Abrolhos Islands in Three Hundred Years of Romance, History, and Adventure. Melbourne: Robertson & Mullens.
- (1945) Waterless Horizons: The First Full-length Study of the Extraordinary Life-story of Edward John Eyre, Explorer, Overlander and Pastoralist in Australia. Melbourne: Robertson & Mullens.
- (1948) Land Looking West: The Story of Governor James Stirling in Western Australia. London: Oxford University Press.
- (1959) A Thousand Men at War: A History of the 2/16th Australian Infantry Battalion, AIF. Willian Heinemann
- (1964) Edward John Eyre (Australian explorers). London: Oxford University Press.
- (1970) The City of Melville From Bushland to Expanding Metropolis. Melville City
