= Michael Gurr =

Australian playwright

- Born: 29 October 1961; Melbourne, Victoria, Australia
- Died: 2 May 2017 (aged 55)
- Education: National Theatre Drama School
- Occupations: Actor; playwright; director; speech writer; screenwriter

Michael Gurr (29 October 1961 – 2 May 2017) was an Australian actor, playwright, author, speech writer and screenwriter.

== Early life ==
Gurr was born in East Malvern, in Melbourne where his father was a kidney doctor at the Alfred Hospital and his mother was a nurse. He was the second of five children.

His first published work was a fictional poem at age 10, from the point of view of a paraplegic, which unintentionally earned him a donation from a Herald Sun reader.

== Career ==
Gurr studied at the National Theatre Drama School (NTDS) in St Kilda, Victoria, and while there wrote a number of short plays, which were sent to Ray Lawler, then Literary Advisor to the Melbourne Theatre Company (MTC). In 1982 Gurr was invited to be Writer in Residence at the MTC and it was there that his first plays were produced.

His best-known plays include Crazy Brave and Sex Diary of an Infidel.

He worked as a speechwriter for a number of years for John Brumby and Steve Bracks, both of whom became Labor Premiers of Victoria.

He died on 2 May 2017. He is survived by his four siblings and his partner Brandon Hardie Jones.

== Bibliography ==
=== Autobiography ===
- Days Like These (2006)

=== Drama ===
- Emmett Stone (1982)
- A Pair of Claws (1983)
- Magnetic North (1983)
- Imitation Real (1983)
- Dead to the World (1986)
- Worlds Apart (1987)
- What You Wanted (1988)
- This and That (1988)
- These Days (1988)
- The Hundred Year Ambush (1990)
- Victoria Bitter (1990)
- Sex Diary of an Infidel (1991)
- Desire Lines (1992)
- Underwear, Perfume and Crash Helmet (1994)
- Jerusalem (1996)
- Anna (1998)
- Shark Finn Soup (1998)
- Crazy Brave (2000)
- The Simple Truth (2002)
- Something to Declare (2003)
- Julia 3 (2004)
- Our Beautiful Daughter (2008)
- Mercy (2009)
- Test Pilot (2010)

=== Poetry ===
- Four Poems (1982)

=== Television ===
- WTF – With Tim Ferguson (2010)

=== Film ===
- Emmett Stone (1985) – an adaption of his 1982 play of the same name. Gurr is credited as screenwriter.
- Departure (1986) – an adaptation of his radio play A Pair of Claws (1983)
