= June Jago =

Australian actress (1928–2010)

- Born: 31 March 1928; Sydney, New South Wales, Australia
- Died: 29 July 2010 (aged 82)
- Occupation: Actress

June Jago (31 March 1928 – 29 July 2010) was an Australian-born actress, who worked in stage, television and film in her native country and the United Kingdom,

== Biography ==
Jago made her stage debut in Australia and went to Britain in the 1950s with a touring production of Summer of the Seventeenth Doll. She made her film debut in 1959 in Please Turn Over, alongside Ted Ray, Jean Kent, Leslie Phillips and Joan Sims.

She appeared in two of the Carry On films - Carry On Regardless (1961) and Carry On Doctor (1967) - and her other film credits included roles in The Captain's Table (1959), No Kidding (1960), Journey into Darkness (1968), The Games (1970) and Melody (1971). She appeared on television in programmes such as Catweazle and The Good Life.

On stage, she appeared with the Royal Shakespeare Company and at the Royal Court Theatre. She also appeared in the Australian films The Man from Snowy River (1982), Double Deal (1983) and Departure (1986).

Jago returned to Australia in the late 1970s and continued to act, notably with the Melbourne Theatre Company, and also worked as a teacher of acting and elocution.

== Filmography ==
Year	Title	Role	Notes
1959	The Captain's Table	Gwenny Coke	
1959	Please Turn Over	Gladys Worth	
1960	No Kidding	Matron	
1961	Carry On Regardless	Nurse	
1967	Carry On Doctor	Sister Hoggett	
1968	Journey Into Darkness	Emily Blake	(episode 'Paper Dolls')
1970	The Games	Mae Harcourt	
1971	Melody	Miss Fairfax	
1982	The Man from Snowy River	Mrs. Bailey	
1983	Double Deal	Mrs. Coolidge	
1986	Departure	Frances	(final film role)
