= Alfred Gaul =

English composer, conductor, teacher and organist

Alfred Robert Gaul (30 April 1837 — 13 September 1913) was an English composer, conductor, teacher and organist.

Alfred Gaul 1837–1913

== Life and career ==
Gaul was born in Norwich, where he studied under Zechariah Buck. By the age of nine he was a chorister at Norwich Cathedral, and at the age of seventeen he was appointed as the organist of the parish church at Fakenham. In 1859 he moved to Birmingham, where at the age of twenty two he was appointed organist at St. John's Church, Ladywood. In 1863 he took the Bachelor of Music degree at the University of Cambridge. He was Master of Music at St Augustine's Church, Edgbaston from 1868, the first Birmingham church to have a surpliced choir.

In 1877 Gaul started teaching the first classes in the theory of music, harmony and counterpoint at the Birmingham and Midland Institute, marking the first step towards providing a fully rounded musical instruction at the institution that would eventually become the Royal Birmingham Conservatoire, later becoming Professor of Orchestration and Composition at the school. In 1887 he succeeded William Cole Stockley as conductor of the Walsall Philharmonic Society. He taught singing and harmony at the King Edward VI High School for Girls and the Blind Asylum.

Gaul wrote a large quantity of choral music in a simple melodious style influenced by Spohr and Mendelssohn. His cantatas were widely performed on the music festival circuit, with the best known The Holy City – premiered at the Birmingham Music Festival in 1882 – being the most popular of its era. At the time of Gaul's death in 1913 it was the most performed work of English choral music in history, and by 1914 over 162,000 copies of its vocal score had been sold. The Holy City and his earlier cantata Ruth (1881) were also popular in the United States.

Surveying Gaul's music in 1947, as it had been reported in the pages of The Musical Times, Percy Scholes noted that

"[in 1883] MT chronicles the performance of The Holy City in London, 'when a very favourable impression of the merits and originality of the work was produced'. In 1887 he was to register another hit, with a secular cantata, Joan of Arc. (A happy thought, by the way, occurred to him when he had completed this last work. With a fine sense of the importance of the occasion he did not allow the pencil and india rubber that he had used in the composition of the great musical-historic effort to become merged and lost amongst the other utensils on his writing table, but thoughtfully presented them to the city of Rouen, where Joan, four-and-a-half centuries before, had been burned alive, in the museum of which city the present writer was cheered by discovering them during the war of 1914-18.

In 1892 Gaul triumphantly arrived at the Crystal Palace, with his Israel in the Wilderness: it was sung, under his own direction, by three thousand lusty Tonic Sol-faists. Then in 1893, at the Norwich Festival, Paderewski and Gaul with his Una (himself conducting), between them drew a record audience, many eager spirits who longed for tickets being turned away. No doubt the pianist-composer thought he had done it, but who knows?"

In 1914, following the composer's death, his Executors published an announcement in The Musical Times to the effect that they were

"prepared to grant licences to approved applicants (under certain restrictions) to orchestrate [Gaul's The Bard of Avon] for a public performance; and are further prepared to send to any performance so arranged a qualified representative who shall be empowered in due course to make an offer, up to £50, for the most approved Full Score; or, if preferred, to arrange for the purchase of the full score on the basis of a Royalty payable on the Sales of the Vocal Score. In the event of any Score made under any such licence not being acquired by the Executors, nothing contained in this advertisement, or in the licence, is to be taken to confer any right of publication or of public performance, or any copyright whatever in respect of such Score."

In the event, the work was orchestrated by Julius Harrison. Scholes reported the enormous number of vocal scores of Gaul's choral works which were sold by Novello and concluded that

"Decidedly Gaul was a 'best-seller'!"

Gaul married Charlotte Cory and they had six children.

== Works (selective list) ==
=== Operetta ===
- 1893 - The Legend of the Wood, juvenile operetta
- 1899 - The Elfin Hill, juvenile operetta
- 1899 - The Hare and the Tortoise; or, Slow and Steady Wins the Race, juvenile operetta

=== Orchestral ===
- 1909 - Suite No.1

=== Choral and vocal ===
==== Major works ====
- 1861 - Hezekiah, oratorio (Amateur Harmonic Association, Town Hall, Birmingham, 29 November 1861)
- 1881 - Ruth, harvest pastoral, Op.34 (Festival Choir of the Birmingham Sunday-School Union, Town Hall, Birmingham, 3 October 1881)
- 1882 - The Holy City, cantata, Op.36 (Birmingham Festival, 30 August 1882)
- 1883 - Passion Service for the Season of Lent (Passion Music), Op.37
- 1887 - Joan of Arc, cantata, Op.41 (Birmingham Festival Choral Society, Birmingham, 13 October 1887)
- 1887 - The Children, part-song
- 1890 - The Ten Virgins, cantata, Op.42 (a selection with piano accompaniment, Town Hall, Birmingham, 13 September 1890)
- 1892 - Israel in the Wilderness, cantata, Op.43 (Crystal Palace, London, 9 July 1892)
- 1893 - Una, cantata, Op.45 (Norwich Festival, 4 October 1893)
- 1895 - Around the Winter Fire, Christmas cantata for female voices and piano
- 1897 - Toilers of the Deep, cantata for female voices
- 1901 - Prologue to The Holy City, Op.36
- 1903 - Prince of Peace, cantata
- 1904 - The Centurion's Servant, sacred cantata
- 1914 - The Bard of Avon, Shakespearian suite for solo voices and chorus, with orchestral accompaniment by Julius Harrison (Birmingham Choral and Orchestral Association, Town Hall, Birmingham, 14 November 1914)

==== Anthems and other smaller sacred works ====
- 1865 - Blessed is the man (Psalm 1)
- 1886 - Praise ye the Lord (Psalm 150) (St Paul's Cathedral, London, 1886)
- 1905 - Office for the Holy Communion in F
- 1887 - Blessed be the Lord God of Israel, anthem, Op.26
- 1886 - Yule-tide, carol for church use

==== Part-songs and other smaller secular works ====
- 1875 - The Shipwreck, glee, Op.11
- 1876 - The Silent Land, part-song, Op.21
- 1882 - Old Neptune, part-song
- 1886 - The Birds, six trios for treble voices, Op.40
- 1885 - Lord Ullin's Daughter, descriptive choral song for male voices
- 1894 - The Harvest Feast, part-song
- 1892 - A Song of Life, ode to music for chorus, Op.44
- 1897 - The Union Jack, unison song for chorus and orchestra
- 1903 - The Singers, part-song
- 1864 - Oh for the Swords of former time, part-song

=== Instrumental ===
- 1876 - The Tournament, march for piano, Op.22
- 1876 - Welcome to our Prince, marche triomphale for piano, Op.24
- 1879 - Continental Sketches, for piano, Op.30
- 1889 - Harold, march for piano
- Piano Sonata in B flat minor

=== Songs ===
- 1865 - Six Sacred Songs, Op.4
- 1885 - The Months, twelve songs for soprano, contralto and piano, Op.38
- 1895 - Midland Songs
- 1896 - Six Action Songs
- 1908 - Six Songs for voices of medium compass and for school use

== Scores and manuscripts ==
Novello, Ewer & Co., London, published vocal scores of Around the Winter Fire, The Bard of Avon, The Elfin Hill, The Hare and the Tortoise, The Holy City, Israel in the Wilderness, Joan of Arc, The Legend of the Wood, The Passion Service, The Prince of Peace, Ruth, A Song of Life, The Ten Virgins, Toilers of the Deep and Una together with orchestral parts for The Union Jack and piano arrangements of the Gavotte and Musette from Suite No.1.

Autograph scores of Around the Winter Fire, Dance of the Elves, Dance of the Reapers, The Holy City, Israel in the Wilderness, Joan of Arc, The Passion Service, Praise ye the Lord, Ruth, A Song of Life, The Ten Virgins, Una, The Union Jack and Yule-tide are held by the Library of the Royal College of Music (Add. Mss 5086).
