= The Royalty (TV series) =

British television series

The Royalty is a 1957 British TV series starring Margaret Lockwood and Hugh Sinclair set in a hotel. Broadcast live, no telerecordings appear to have survived, and the series is believed to be lost.

== Cast ==
- Margaret Lockwood as Mollie Miller
- Hugh Sinclair as Richard Manning
- Lana Morris as Maisie
- Richard Pearson as Fred Potter
- Joan Hickson as Miss Plimm
