= Anne Rogers =

English actress, singer and dancer (born 1933)

- Born: 29 July 1933 (age 93); Liverpool (then part of Lancashire, now Merseyside), England, UK
- Occupations: Actress, dancer, singer
- Known for: Belle's Magical World
- Spouse: Michael Hall

Anne Rogers (born 29 July 1933) is a retired British actress, dancer, and singer.

== Early years ==
Anne Rogers was born to Patrick and Ellen Rogers who lived at 2 Atkinson Street L3 (now demolished it was adjacent to St Anne Street) in Liverpool. She was evacuated at the start of WWII to Winsford, Cheshire.

== Career ==
In 1954, she had a minor part in the original West End production of Sandy Wilson's The Boy Friend. "With only a day to go to opening the leading lady was taken ill ... Rogers recalls that 'the director said 'can anyone sing a top C?' I put up my hand and said 'I can'. And we opened the next night'." She played the lead role of Polly Browne for nearly four years.

She was unable to appear in the Broadway production of The Boy Friend due to London commitments paving the way to Julie Andrews's stardom, but Rogers later went to the U.S. to play Eliza Doolittle in the Hollywood and Chicago productions of My Fair Lady, winning the Sarah Siddons Award for her performance. After two years, she returned to London to play the same role for three years at the Theatre Royal (Drury Lane).

She appeared on Broadway in Half a Sixpence and 42nd Street. When she played Jessie Matthews in the 2000 West End production of Over My Shoulder, the Telegraph welcomed her back as a "marvellous old trouper." She played Gladys in the gala New York performance of the musical Busker Alley in 2005, starring alongside Jim Dale, Glenn Close and George S. Irving.

== Personal life ==
Rogers was married to Michael Hall, the son of the famous bandleader Henry Hall.

== Selected roles ==
=== Stage shows ===
- The Boy Friend
- My Fair Lady
- She Loves Me
- I Do! I Do!
- Half a Sixpence
- Zenda
- 42nd Street
- Gigi
- Camelot
- A Streetcar Named Desire (in South Africa)
- Over My Shoulder (as Jessie Matthews)
- Busker Alley.
- The Drowsy Chaperone

=== TV appearances ===
- Sparkling Cyanide
- Birds on the Wing
- Hogan's Heroes
- Doctors (BBC 2008)
- MacGyver (Season 2 episode "Three for the Road")

== Awards ==
Awards
Preceded by Shirley Booth	Sarah Siddons Award – Sarah Siddons Society, Chicago; 1958	Succeeded by Ruth Roman
