= St Augustine's Church, Edgbaston =

Church in Birmingham, England

Church of St Augustine of Hippo, Edgbaston
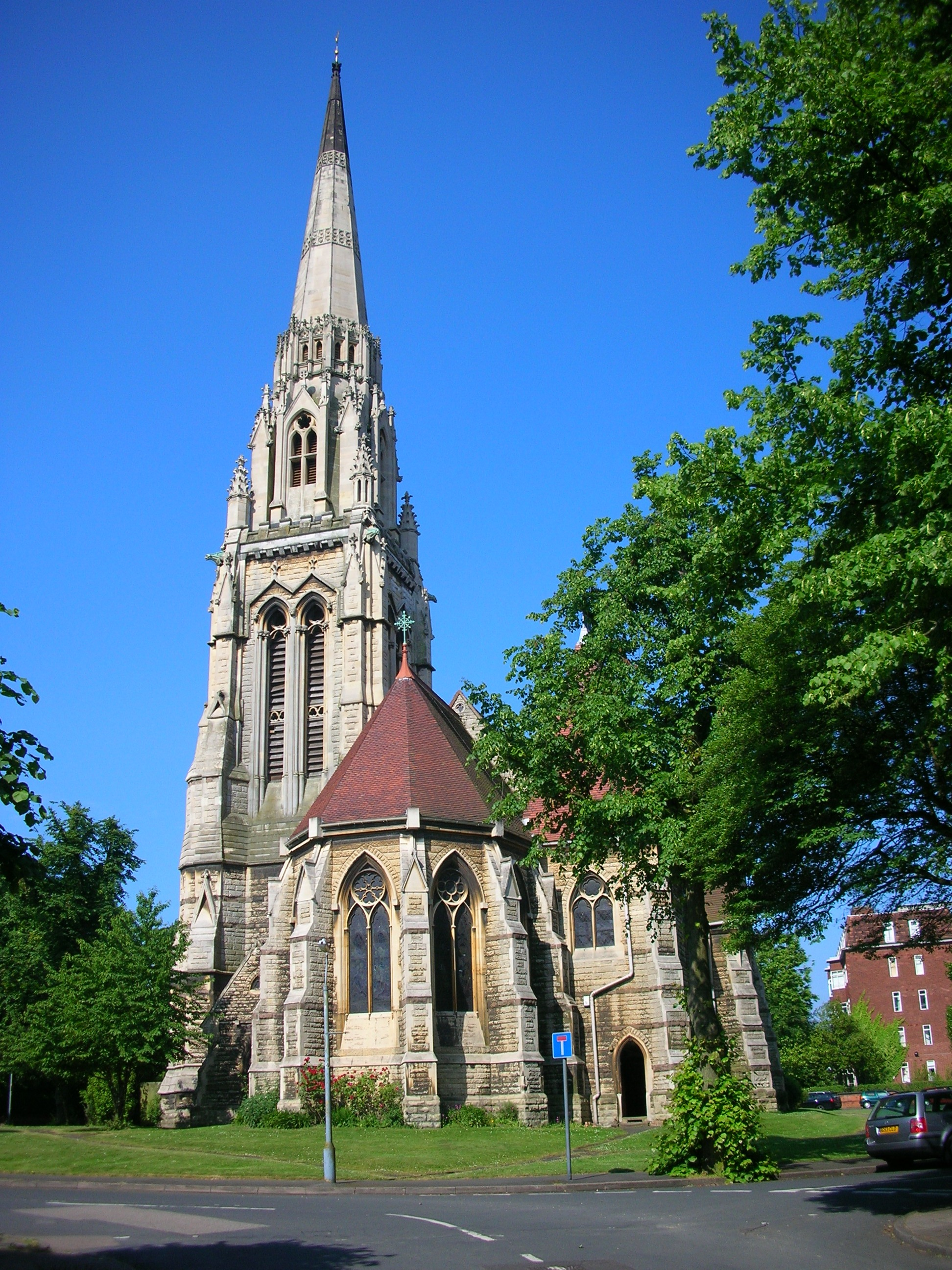
- Parish Church of St Augustine of Hippo, Edgbaston
- Church of St Augustine of Hippo, Edgbaston
- 52.4734°N 1.9459°W
- OS grid reference: SP 03776 86158
- Denomination: Church of England
- Churchmanship: Anglo-Catholicism
- Website: www.staugustines-edgbaston.org.uk

History
- Dedication: St. Augustine of Hippo

Administration
- Province: Canterbury
- Diocese: Birmingham
- Archdeaconry: Birmingham
- Deanery: Warley & Edgbaston

Clergy
- Vicar: Matthew Tomlinson

The Church of St Augustine of Hippo in Lyttelton Road, Edgbaston, Birmingham, England, is a parish church in the Church of England.

== Background ==
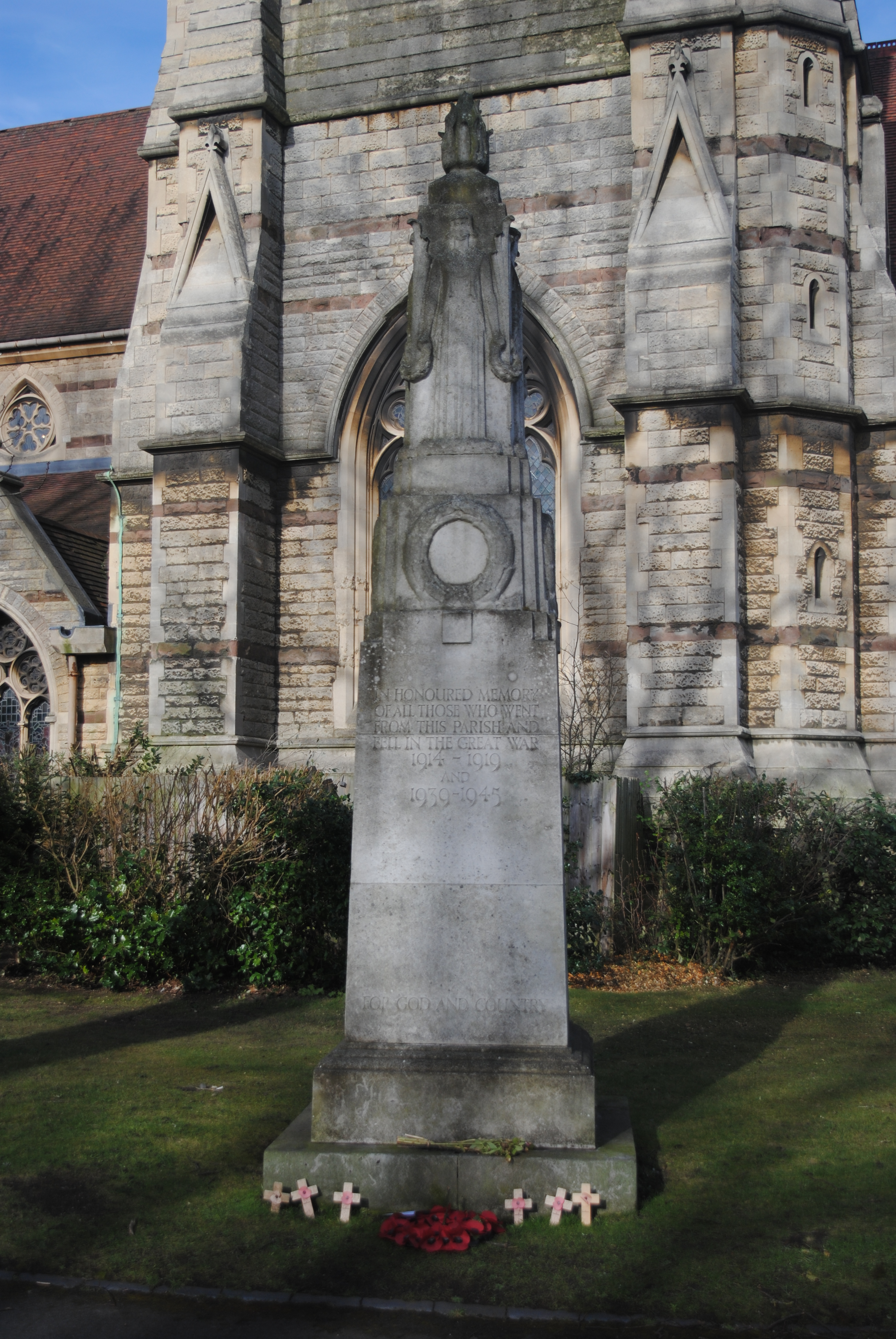
Edgbaston War Memorial

St Augustine's Church stands at the centre of a conservation area which bears its name. It is one of the very few Anglican churches dedicated to St. Augustine of Hippo. It is Grade II* listed.

Edgbaston War Memorial, separately listed at Grade II, stands in the churchyard. It was erected in 1921 to commemorate the dead of World War I, and was subsequently modified to include those of World War II.

== History ==
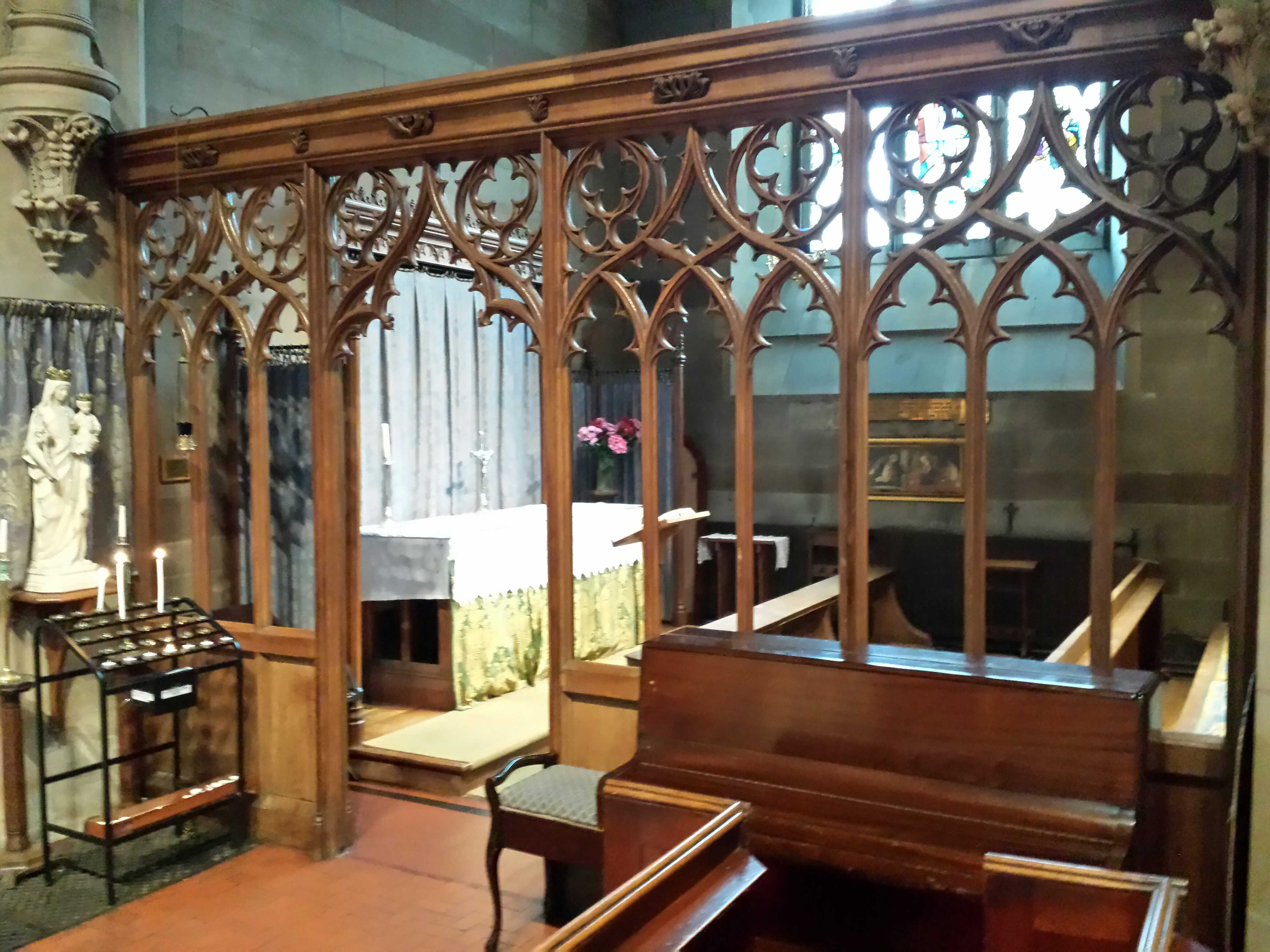
The Lady Chapel with gothic tracery oak screen

By 1851, houses had been built spasmodically along the Hagley Road as far as Rotton Park Road. Portland & York Roads were cut during this decade. As Edgbaston's population grew, the Church of England responded by building new churches and St. George's Church, Edgbaston, was consecrated in 1838 and St James's in 1852.

In 1864, Joseph Gillott, the wealthy pen manufacturer, who was then resident in Westbourne Road, Edgbaston, discussed with J. A. Chatwin the location for a new church.

Following an open competition, the design by J. A. Chatwin was chosen. Chatwin had suggested "forming an island site a short distance from the Hagley Road which should be approached by a straight road from that thoroughfare". This site was offered to the ecclesiastical authorities for a new church as existing church accommodation was inadequate for the population of 18,000. A Subscription Account raised £9,000 (equivalent to £880,000 in 2025), for the building of a church dedicated to St Augustine of Hippo.

The foundation stone was laid on 14 October 1867 and the body of the church, its chancel, nave and aisles were consecrated on 12 September 1868 by the Bishop of Worcester, Mervyn Charles-Edwards.

The tower and spire, 185 feet high and the tallest in Birmingham, were added in 1876 at a cost of £4,000 (equivalent to £400,000 in 2025),. The body of the church is in the Geometric Gothic style and has a striking painted chancel ceiling representing chapter 5 of the Book of Revelation and some very good stained glass by Hardman & Co. There is a wealth of stone carving inside, much of it by John Roddis, including a reredos with its representation of the Last Supper based upon Leonardo da Vinci's design, and unusual capitals on the nave pillars representing the four seasons and twelve months of the year.

Just before the Second World War the South transept, underneath the tower, was cleared of pews to create a Lady chapel. This was given in memory of Benjamin Tilley (1851-1920) and his wife, Elinor G. Tilley (1855-1930) by their daughter, Elinor Mary Incledon (1878-1954). The chapel is surrounded on two sides by a parclose screen, completed after the war, and carved partly in an Art Nouveau style by Robert Pancheri.

A new baptistry created in the North transept in 1964 was designed by George Pace and a spacious narthex, designed by P. B. Chatwin (Chatwin's son), was added in 1968 to mark the church's centenary year. The carving on the font cover is by John Bunting, as also are the finials on the riddel posts of the Lady Chapel, representing the four evangelists.

The church has a brass lectern by John Hardman, in the shape of an Eagle, dating from its opening. It was stolen on 10 June 2024, and one week later recovered from a local scrap yard.

=== Incumbents ===
- 1868-1903 The Reverend J. C. Blissard, MA, RD
- 1903-1912 The Venerable Winfrid Oldfield Burrows, MA
- 1912-1923 The Reverend Dr Rosslyn Bruce FLS, MA, DD
- 1923-1929 The Reverend Canon Arthur Gittins Lloyd, MA
- 1929-1938 The Venerable John Harold Richards
- 1938-1949 The Reverend Canon John Cuthbert Lucas, MA
- 1949-1964 The Reverend Canon Cecil Rhodes, MA
- 1965-1977 The Reverend Philip Llewellyn Richards, MA
- 1978-1985 The Reverend John Maxwell Lucas
- 1986-1999 The Reverend Raymond Franklin Price
- 2000- The Reverend Matthew Tomlinson, BA, BD, MMCM

== Music ==
The church has a notable choral tradition, being the first Anglican church in Birmingham to have a surpliced choir. Masters of Music have included Alfred Robert Gaul, Sir William Henry Harris and Harvey J. Stansfield. The composer Herbert Howells wrote his 'St Augustine's Service' for the choir in 1967. The choir performed this difficult piece for only the second time since 1967 on 13 October 2013, as part of the Dedication Festival of the church. It can be heard here: "St Augustine's Service – 13th October 2013"

=== Organ ===
The organ is by Hill with work by Rothwell and Nicholson. A specification of the organ can be found on the National Pipe Organ Register

=== Directors of Music ===
- Alfred Robert Gaul 1868 – 1913
- Sir William Henry Harris KCVO 1913 – 1919
- Thomas William North 1919 – 1955
- Philip Moore 1956 – 1960
- Roy Massey MBE 1960 – 1965
- Derek Williams 1965 – 1972
- Philip Godden 1973 – 1975
- Nigel Argust 1975 – 1979
- Norman Dyson 1979 – 1987 (previously organist of St Mary's Church, Moseley)
- Christopher Harker 1985 – 2004
- Darren Hogg 2004 – 2008
- Paul Richards 2008 – 2012
- Thomas Keogh 2012 to 2015
- Sarah Fox 2016
- David Whitehead 2016 to 2020
- Harvey J. Stansfield 2021-2022

== See also ==
- List of works by George Pace
