= Janie Hampton =

British author (born 1952)

- Born: Anderson; 14 March 1952 (age 74); London
- Occupations: Author, social historian, women's health activist
- Spouse: Charles Hampton (m. 1971 d. 2023)
- Children: 4
- Parent(s): Verily Anderson and Captain Donald Clive Anderson
- Relatives: Rachel Anderson (sister)
- Website: janiehampton.co.uk

Janie Hampton (born as Anderson, 14 March 1952) is a British author, best known for her biography of Joyce Grenfell and social history books The Austerity Olympics, How the Girl Guides Won the War, and an international development and women's health activist.

== Biography ==
Janie Hampton is the daughter of the author Verily Anderson and the playwright Donald Anderson. Her siblings include the author Rachel Anderson. She was married to Charles Hampton from 1971 to 2023 and has four children and six grandchildren.

While living on a small-holding in Shropshire in the 1970s, Hampton designed and made clothes that she sold in London, Los Angeles and Rome. Her customers included musician Robert Plant and author Louisa Young.

In 1980, the Hamptons moved to Zimbabwe, where she studied for a BA in Human Sciences, wrote books and articles on health issues, and was the Women's Editor of the Manica Post. After her return to Britain in 1985, she produced The Medical Programme and Focus on Africa for the BBC World Service. In 1988, she gained an MSc in International Health from the Institute of Child Health, London. Her thesis was on the health and development of pre-school children, researched while living in the remote Honde Valley, Zimbabwe

In 1991, the British Overseas Development Administration (now the Foreign Commonwealth Development Office) commissioned Hampton to develop its policy on international women's health. She then planned reproductive health projects in Africa, South America and Asia for governments and non-government organisations.

In 1992, Hampton was elected onto the founding committee of Writers in Oxford and became its chair in 2003. As part of the 2001 Year of the Artist she was the first Arts Council-sponsored writer-in-residence in a pub. She is an Associate Member of Lucy Cavendish College, Cambridge.

In 2009, Hampton founded the Chauncy Maples Malawi Trust which raised £2 million to improve the health of the people living around Lake Malawi. In 2014, she became patron of the Malawi Association UK and represented Malawi as a guest of HM Queen at the Commonwealth Reception at Buckingham Palace.

In 2016, Hampton began to connect activists, practitioners, politicians, researchers and individuals around the world working to improve menstrual health. With The Malawi Girl Guides Association, The Cup Effect Hampton ran a feasibility study in a refugee camp, secondary schools and a national park which showed that women and girls in Malawi want to use menstrual cups. Compared to washable cloths or single use pads or tampons, they found cups more comfortable, cheaper, safer and more environmentally sustainable. As a result, ActionAid Malawi has begun a national menstrual cup programme. Hampton promotes menstrual health through the media, including an essay for Aeon ideas website and for World Menstrual Day.

== Journalism, broadcasting and public speaking ==
Hampton has written articles for various newspapers and magazines, including the Guardian, Daily Telegraph, The Times, The Independent, Spare Rib, Total Politics, New Statesman, Sunday Telegraph, and The Author. In 2011, she was appointed Olympics Correspondent of The Oldie magazine.

Hampton wrote a "History Girl" blog every month with articles on a range of subjects including Elizabeth Fry, hammock exercise, and great women such as Victorian novelist and philanthropist Felicia Skene.

Hampton has been a journalist in Zimbabwe, Kenya, Democratic Republic of Congo and Uganda and was interviewed about the history of the Olympic Games in London on various radio stations and television channels, including BBC Breakfast and Newsnight.

Hampton has spoken at Cliveden House, The Oldie literary luncheons, The World Literacy Summit and many literary festivals.

== Books ==
A Family Outing in Africa described the Hampton's journey from Zimbabwe to the UK via Zaire (on public transport with her three children) and was published by Macmillan in 1988. She continued to write about health issues throughout the 1990s and was also increasingly successful as an author of social history. In 2002, her biography of writer and actor Joyce Grenfell was published to critical acclaim.

The Austerity Olympics, a social history of the London Olympics of 1948, was introduced by Sebastian Coe and quoted by many Olympic observers, including Mayor of London Boris Johnson and was shortlisted for the William Hill Sports Book of the Year. The book was filmed by BBC TV as Bert and Dickie, starring Matt Smith and Geoffrey Palmer.

How the Girl Guides Won the War chronicled the role of Guides and Brownies in 20th-century feminist history. In 2018, Lionsgate of Hollywood obtained the rights to the book for a film.

=== Non-fiction ===
- A Family Outing in Africa (1988)
- Joyce Grenfell, The First Biography (2002)
- The Austerity Olympics: When the Games Came to London in 1948 (2008)
- How the Girl Guides Won the War (2010)
- London Olympics: 1908 and 1948 (2011)
- The Royal Tours (2013)
- Rationing and Revelry: The Coronation of Queen Elizabeth II, 1953 (2013)

=== Books edited by Janie Hampton ===
- Joyce and Ginnie – The Letters of Joyce Grenfell & Virginia Graham (1997)
- Internally Displaced People – A Global Survey (1998)
- Hats off! The poetry of Joyce Grenfell (2002)
- My Kind of Magic – Articles by Joyce Grenfell (2003)
- Letters from Aldeburgh by Joyce Grenfell (2006)

=== Books contributed to by Janie Hampton ===
- "Joyce Grenfell", in British Comedy Greats (2003)
- "Felicia Skene", in Oxford – One City, Many Voices (2004)
- "Things I Wish I'd Known When I Was Younger", in Does Cockshutt Beat Sandy Balls? (2007)

=== Books on health ===
- Happy Healthy Children – child care in Africa (1985)
- Healthy Living, Healthy Loving – sex education for Africa (1987)
- World Health (1987)
- Meeting AIDS with Compassion in Ghana (1990)
- Positive Living with Aids in Uganda (1990)
- Healthy Mothers, Happy Babies in Africa (1990)
- Aches and Pains – Living with Arthritis and Rheumatism ( 1992)
- Up and About with Arthritis (1997)

=== Children's fiction ===
- What Made Joseph Ill? (1988)
- "The Red Sock", in Stories for Four Year Olds (1989)
- "The Baobab and the Banyan Tree", in Stories Around the World (1992)
- Come Home Soon, Baba (1994)
