= Rachel Anderson =

English journalist and author (born 1943)

- Born: 1943 (age 82–83); Hampton Court, Surrey, England
- Occupations: Author and journalist
- Known for: Children's books
- Spouse: David Bradby (m. 1965; died 2011)
- Children: 4
- Parents: Donald Clive Anderson (father); Verily Anderson (mother)
- Relatives: Janie Hampton (sister)
- Awards: Guardian Children's Fiction Prize, 1991
- Website: rachelanderson.co.uk

Rachel Anderson (born 1943) is an English journalist and author best known for her children's books. Her work often features the positive portrayal of characters with learning disabilities, and themes of social injustice and alienation. She was married for 45 years to the writer and translator David Bradby. Her mother was the writer Verily Anderson.

For the novel Paper Faces, published by OUP in 1991, Anderson won the Guardian Children's Fiction Prize, a once-in-a-lifetime book award judged by a panel of British children's writers.

== Biography ==
Born in 1943 in Hampton Court, Surrey, Rachel Anderson is the second of the five children born to Verily Anderson and Captain Donald Anderson, her siblings including the author and health activist Janie Hampton.

Leaving school at the age of 16, Rachel Anderson initially became a journalist, working for BBC Radio, newspapers and women's magazines. For 10 years, she was children's book reviews editor for Good Housekeeping. Her first book – Pineapple, an adult novel – was published in 1965, in the same week that she and David Bradby were married. Her other books for adults are The Purple Heart Throbs: The Sub-Literature of Love (1974), Dream Lovers (1978), and For the Love of Sang (1990). She now writes mainly for a young readership.

Her 2011 novel for teenagers, Asylum, was published in the same week as her mother's final book that was being completed at the time of her death the previous year.

Rachel Anderson has four children and "a range of grandchildren" and lives mainly in Cromer, Norfolk.

== Works ==
=== Children's and young adult books ===
- Moffatt's Road (1978)
- Tim Walks (1985)
- Jessy Runs Away (1988)
- French Lessons (1988)
- Tough as Old Boots (1988)
- The Bus People (1989)
- Julie and the Queen of Tonga (1990)
- Best Friends (1991)
- Treasures for Cousin Crystal (1992)
- The Working Class (1993)
- Jessy and the Long-short Dress (1993)
- Black Water (1994)
- The Doll's House (1995)
- Princess Jazz and the Angels (1995)
- Letters from Heaven (1996)
- Blackthorn, Whitethorn (1997)
- Carly's Luck (1998)
- Ollie and the Trainers (1999)
- The Scavenger's Tale (2000)
- The War Orphan (1984, 2000)
- The Flight of the Emu (2001)
- Joe's Story (2001)
- Paper Faces (2002)
- The Rattletrap Trip (2003)
- Hello Peanut! (2003)
- Hugo and the Long Red Arm (2004)
- Pizza on Saturday (2004)
- The Poacher's Son (2006)
- Warlands (2006)
- This Strange New Life (2006)
- Red Moon (2006)
- Big Ben (2007)
- Asylum (2011)

The Little Angel Trilogy:

- Little Angel Comes to Stay (1984)
- Little Angel, Bonjour (1988)
- Happy Christmas Little Angel (1991)

Moving Times' Trilogy:

- Bloom of Youth (1999)
- Grandmother's Footsteps (1999)
- Stronger than Mountains (2000)

=== Adult books ===
- Pineapple (Jonathan Cape, 1965)
- Dream Lovers (1978)
- For the Love of Sang (1990)

=== Literary criticism ===
- The Purple Heart Throbs: The Sub-literature of Love (1974)

=== Translations ===
- The Cat's Tale (1985)
- Renard the Fox (1986) with D. Bradby
- Wild Goose Chase (1986)
- Little Lost Fox (1992)

== Awards ==
- 1949: Tiny Tots Order of Merit (TTOM)
- 1992: Guardian Children's Fiction Prize for Paper Faces (one of two winners)
- 1990: Medical Journalists' Award
