= Theatre and Performance Research Association =

- Genre: Arts & humanities scholarly organisation
- Frequency: Annually each September
- Inaugurated: September 2005
- Most recent: 2-4 September 2026
- Area: UK and Ireland
- Website: http://www.tapra.org/

The Theatre and Performance Research Association, or TaPRA for short, is an academic organisation focusing on theatre, drama and performance. It was founded in 2005, largely in response to the 2001 RAE [Research Assessment Exercise]. Academics from drama and theatre departments at Kent, Leeds, Royal Holloway, Warwick, QMUL, Birmingham, Manchester, Nottingham Trent, Bristol, Central School of Speech and Drama, Lancaster, Sheffield, Roehampton, Glasgow, Exeter and Trinity College, Dublin formed the initial steering group. In 2019, TaPRA became a company limited by guarantee.

TaPRA describes its aim as "to foster research that:

- enables links between practitioners and scholars within performance disciplines and across cognate fields;
- liaises with specialist organisations and groupings;
- encourages early career research in theatre and performance."

Membership is largely British and Irish, although international members are welcomed, regularly contributing at conferences and symposia. Individual academics pay an annual fee to become members.

The current Chairs of TaPRA are Dr Broderick Chow, Dr Rachel Hann and Professor Royona Mitra. Past Chairs are Professor Viv Gardner, Professor Maggie Gale, Professor Gilli Bush-Bailey and Professor Roberta Mock.

The book, Research Methods in Theatre and Performance (Edinburgh University Press, 2011), edited by Baz Kershaw and Helen Nicholson, was developed in association with TaPRA. Many of its chapters were written collaboratively by TaPRA Working Group convenors.

== Conferences ==
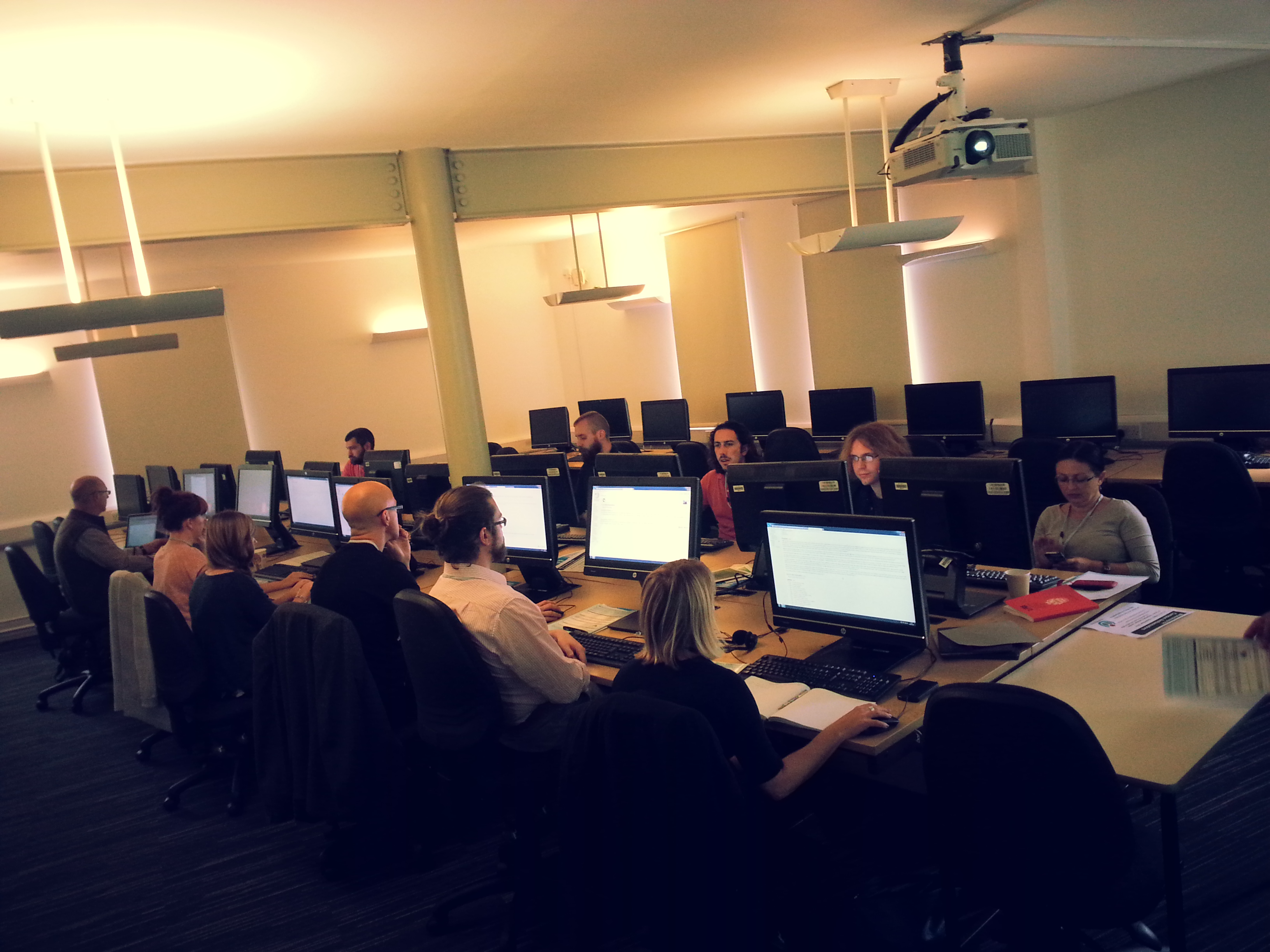
Wikimedia Workshop at TaPRA Conference 2014, Royal Holloway, University of London

TaPRA holds an annual conference in September. The event lasts three days, and is peripatetic, hosted by a different academic institution each year.

Unlike some research organisations, TaPRA does not determine overall themes for its conferences. Instead, separate Working Groups generate their own topics for the annual conference and issue their own Calls for Presentations. These Working Groups are currently Theatre History and Historiography; Performance and New Technologies; Bodies and Performance; Directing and Dramaturgy; Applied and Social Theatre; Documenting Performance; Performance, Identity and Community; Performer Training; Performance and Science; Theatre, Performance and Philosophy; Audience, Experience & Popular Practices (formerly Popular Performance); Scenography; Sound, Voice & Music; and the most recent addition, Performance and Science. Working Groups also arrange interim events around the UK and Ireland, from one-day symposia to theatre visits and walking tours.

Keynote speakers at the annual conference have included Lloyd Newson, Erika Fischer-Lichte, Bruce McConachie, Shannon Jackson, Ric Knowles, Susan Bennett, Philip Auslander, Manon van de Water, Kully Thiarai, and Harvey Young. Conferences also often also feature live performances, such as works by Third Angel, Kieran Hurley, Accidental Collective and Mike Pearson.

- 2005 - University of Manchester, 8–10 September
- 2006 - Central School of Speech and Drama, 7–9 September
- 2007 - University of Birmingham, 5–7 September
- 2008 - University of Leeds, 3–5 September
- 2009 - University of Plymouth, 7–9 September
- 2010 - University of Glamorgan in Cardiff, 9–11 September
- 2011 - Kingston University London, 7–9 September
- 2012 - University of Kent, 5–7 September
- 2013 - Royal Conservatoire of Scotland, in partnership with the University of Glasgow, 4–6 September
- 2014 - Royal Holloway, University of London, 3–5 September
- 2015 - University of Worcester, 8–10 September
- 2016 - University of Bristol, 5–7 September
- 2017 - University of Salford, 30 August - 1 September
- 2018 - Aberystwyth University, 5–7 September
- 2019 - University of Exeter, 4–6 September
- 2021 - Online conference, hosted with Liverpool Hope University, 6–10 September
- 2022 - University of Essex (hybrid), 12–14 September
- 2023 - University of Leeds (hybrid), 30 August-1 September
- 2024 - Northumbria University (hybrid), 4-6 September
- 2025 - University of Warwick, 27-29 August
- 2026 - Queen Mary University of London, 2-4 September

The TaPRA Postgraduate Symposium has been running since 2009, focusing on presentation and career development opportunities for postgraduate and early career researchers. Between 2018 and 2021, this event was co-organised with the Standing Conference of University Drama Departments (SCUDD; now called Drama HE).

== Awards ==
TaPRA presents several awards at each conference, including the David Bradby Monograph Prize (formerly awarded for a body of work), the Early Career Researcher Prize, the Transformative Research Prize and the Postgraduate Essay Prize. David Bradby Prize winners include Heike Roms (2011), Aoife Monks (2012), Jacky Bratton (2013), Kate Dorney and Frances Gray (2014), Duška Radosavljević (2015), Sally Mackey (2016), Jim Davis (2017) and Kélina Gotman (2018). David Bradby Award winners present a keynote at the annual conference. Since 2019, the TaPRA Early Career Researcher Prize winner has also been invited to deliver a keynote; the first ECR keynote was presented by Margherita Laera.

The TaPRA Prize for Editing was won in 2018 by Dee Heddon and Dominic Johnson for It’s all Allowed: the Performances of Adrian Howells (Live Art Development Agency and Intellect, 2016), and, in 2019, by Richard Gough for the 100th issue of Performance Research journal.
