= 24th Locarno Film Festival =

Film festival in Locarno, Switzerland

- Location: Locarno, Switzerland
- Founded: 1946
- Awards: Golden Leopard: First feature films: On the Point of Death; They Have Changed Their Face; Corrado Farina; The Friends; Second feature films: Private Road; Znaki Na Drodze
- Festival date: Opening: 6 August 1971; Closing: 15 August 1971
- Website: Locarno Film Festival

Locarno Film Festival
- 25th 23rd

The 24th Locarno Film Festival was held from 6 to 15 August 1971 in Locarno, Switzerland. Following the resignation of Sandro Bianconi and Freddy Buache the year before the directors of the festival became a committee of seven.

The festival returned to is traditional summer schedule and open-air screenings. The festival featured the first screenings on the Piazza Grande, which would become a staple of the festival. The constructed open-air screen on the Piazza Grande was the biggest in Europe at the time, twenty by ten meters. Interestingly, no Swiss films were featured at the festival.

The festival awarded six Golden Leopards, the festival's top prize, this year. Three for best first features, two for best second features, and one for best "third world" feature.The first feature films awarded were On the Point of Death directed by Mario Garriba, They Have Changed Their Face directed by Corrado Farina, and The Friends directed by Gérard Blain.The Golden Leopards for best second features were awarded to Private Road by Barney Platts-Mills, Znaki Na Drodze by J. Piotrowsky. In the category of "third world" cinema Mexico: The Frozen Revolution directed by Raymundo Gleyzer won the Golden Leopard.

== Jury ==
The jury consisted of Russian actor and director Sergei Bondarchouk, Brazilian director David Neves, French producer Georges Roitfel, Swiss TV director Jurg Federspiel, and Italian thespian Francesca Romana Coluzzi.

== Official Sections ==
The following films were screened in these sections:

=== Main Program ===
Main Program / Feature Films In Competition

Original Title	English Title	Director(s)	Year	Production Country
A Fable (The Slave)		Al Freeman Jr.	1971	USA
Apa Ca Un Bivol Negru	Water Like a Black Buffalo	Andrei C. Balenau, Peter Bokor	1970	Romania
Brother John		James Goldestone	1971	USA
Ciao, Gulliver	So Long Gulliver	Carlo Tuzii	1970	Italia
Hanno Cambiato Faccia	They Have Changed Their Face	Corrado Farina	1971	Italia
Ich Liebe Dich - Ich Töte Dich	I Love you - I Kill you	Uwe Brandner	1971	Germany
Il Punto Di Morte	On the Point of Death	Mario Garriba	1971	Italia
Krasnaia Ploschad	Slabbid	Vassili Ordynski	1970	Russia
Le Sauveur	The Savior	Michel Mardore	1971	France
Les Amis	The Friends	Gérard Blain	1970	France
Lucie A Zazrazy	Lucie and the Rescue	Ota Koval	1970	Czech Republic
Mexico, La Revolucion Congelada	Mexico: the Frozen Revolution	Raymundo Gleyzer	1971	Argentina
Private Road		Barney Platts-Mills	1971	Great Britain
Question De Vie	Life Question	André Théberge	1971	Canada
Take The Money And Run		Woody Allen	1969	USA
Viva La Muerte	Long Live Death	Fernando Arrabal	1971	Tunisia, France
Zeit Der Störche	Time of Storks	Siegfried Kühn	1971	Germany
Znaki Na Drodze	Signs on the Road	J. Piotrowsky	1970	Poland

Short and Medium-length films in Competition

Original Title	English Title	Director(s)	Production Country
Elephant Lore		Daybhai Bhakta	India
La Pierre Qui Flotte	The Float Stone	Jean-Jacques Andrien	Belgium
Non Siamo Abituati A Vedere Bandiere Senza Vento	We are not Used to Seeing Windless Flags	Jobst Grapow	Italia

=== Out of Competition (Fuori Concorso) ===
Main Program / Feature Films Out of Competition

Original Title	English Title	Director(s)	Year	Production Country
Bang Bang		Andréa Tonacci	1971	Brazil
Breathing Together: Revolution In The Electric Family		Morley Markson	1971	Canada
Bronco Bullfrog		Barney Platts-Mills	1969	Great Britain
Bronte, Cronaca Di Un Massacro Che I Libri Di Storia Non Hanno Mai Narrato	Bronte, Chronicle of a Massacre that History Books Have Never Narrated	Florestano + Vancini	1971	Italia
Egi Barany		Miklós Jancsó	1970	Hungary
Going Down The Road		Donald Shebib	1970	Canada
Le Petit Matin	Early in the Morning	I.G. Albicocco	1971	France
Making It		John Erman	1971	USA
Mathias Kneissl		Reinhardt Hauff	1970	Germany
On Est Loin Du Soleil	We are Far from the Sun	Jacques Leduc	1971	Canada
Pioniere In Ingolstadt	Pioneers in Ingolstadt	Rainer Werner Fassbinder	1971	Germany
Romance Of A Horse Thief		Abraham Polonsky	1971	USA
Un'Anguilla Da 300 Milioni	A 300 Million Eel	Salvatore Samperi	1971	Italia
Yehudin Menuhin, Chemin De Lumiere	T	François Reichenbach	1970	France

Short and Medium-length films - Out of Competition

Short and Medium-length films Outside Competition
Original Title	English Title	Director(s)	Production Country
A Sense Of Responsibility		Alan Ball	Great Britain
Büntetöexpidìciò	Criminal	Deszö Magyar	Hungary
Come Into My Parlour		C. Evans	Great Britain
Le Voyage De Herve Le Biham	The Journey of Herve Le Bihan	Laszlo Zsabo	France
Vrijeme Vampira	Vampire Time	Nikola Majdac	Yugoslavia

=== Retrospective - Cinema And Resistance ===
Original Title	English Title	Director(s)	Year	Production Country
Aldo Dice: 26 X 1		Fernando Cerchio	1945	Italia
De Rode Enge	The Red Scary	Lau Lauritzen	1945	Denmark
Hangmen Aldo Die		Fritz Lang	1942	USA
Il Sole Sorge Ancora	The Sun Still Arises	Aldo Vergano	1946	Italia
Il Terrorista	The Terrorist	Gianfranco De Bosio	1963	Italia
La Bataille Du Rail	Rail Battle	René Clément	1946	France
La Verte Moisson	Green Harvest	François Villiers	1959	France
Lettere Di Condannati A Morte Della Resistenza Italiana	Letters of Condemned to Death of the Italian Resistance	Fausto Fornari	1953	Italia
Ljubljana Pozdravlja-Osvoboditelje	Ljubljana Welcomes-Insults	Marijan Förster	1946	Yugoslavia
Normandie-Niemen	Normandy-Niemen	Jean Dréville	1960	France, Russia
Ostatni Etap	Last Stage	Wanda Jakubowska	1948	Poland
Paisà	Paisan	Roberto Rossellini	1946	Italia
Partizanske Dokumente	Partisan Documents	Joze Gale	1950	Yugoslavia

=== Special Sections - Animated Films ===
Animated Films - Feature Films
Original Title	English Title	Director(s)	Year	Production Country
Il Cavaliere Inesistente	The Non -Existent Knight	Pino Zac	1969	Italia
Animated Films - Short Films (In Preview)
A Racs	T	Gyula Macskassy, György Varnai		Hungary
Chewingo Home		Daniel Suter		Switzerland
Die Ordnung	The Order	Bohumil Stepan		Germany
Digging		Jim Duffy		USA
Eggs		John Hubley		USA
Horizont	Horizon	Jerzy Kotowsky		Poland
Il Messaggio	The Message	Giulio Gianini		Italia
Il Signor Rossi Al Camping	Mr. Rossi at the Campsite	Bruno Bozzetto		Italia
Jeton: Le Western		Jean Meunier		France
Last To Go		Gérald Potterton		Canada
Les Pelerins	The Pérrines	Gérard Vallet		Switzerland
Linea 3	Line 3	Osvaldo Cavandoli		Italia
Linea 4	Line 4	Osvaldo Cavandoli		Italia
Love Affair		Roy Evans		Great Britain
Melyviz		Marcell Jankovics		Hungary
My Son, The King		Bob Kurtz		USA
Naslednitsi	Heirs	Ivan Vesselinov	1970	Bulgaria
No Arks		Abu Abraham		Great Britain
Ogni Regno	Every Kingdom	Secondo Bignardi		Italia
Paradise Lost		Evelyn Lambart		Canada
Patatomanie		Jean Image		France
Patchwork		Claude Luyet, Manuel Otero		France
Preacher		Pavel Prochazka		Switzerland
Rainbow Bear		Bill Melendez		USA
Scarabus		Gérald Frydman	1971	Belgium
Simon Says		Anestos Tritchonis		USA
Stara Panna	Spinster	L. Naibauerova		Czech Republic
Syncromie		Norman McLaren		Canada
The Dream Of The Sphynx		Jim Gore		USA
Trimata Gloupatsi	The Three Fools	Doniou Donev	1970	Bulgaria

== Official Awards ==
=== International Jury ===
- Golden Leopard for the best first features: On the Point of Death directed by Mario Garriba, They Have Changed Their Face directed by Corrado Farina, and The Friends directed by Gérard Blain.
- Golden Leopard for the best second features: Private Road by Barney Platts-Mills, Znaki Na Drodze by J. Piotrowsky.
- Prize for a Production of the Third World: MEXICO, LA REVOLUCION CONGELADA by Raymundo Gleyzer
