= 23rd Locarno Film Festival =

Film festival in Locarno, Switzerland

- Location: Locarno, Switzerland
- Founded: 1946
- Awards: Golden Leopard: This Transient Life; Lilika; Soleil O; End of the Road
- Artistic director: Freddy Buache; Sandro Bianconi
- Festival date: Opening: 24 September 1970; Closing: 4 October 1970
- Website: Locarno Film Festival

Locarno Film Festival
- 24th 22nd

The 23rd Locarno Film Festival was held from 24 September to 4 October 1970 in Locarno, Switzerland. The festival continued its unique trend of only allowing first or second pictures from directors to compete. The festival also featured a UNESCO meeting on Literature, Film, and Television.

Some festival organizers expressed a desire to move it back to its tradition summer schedule to increase tourism for the city, which was the main funder of the festival. This was opposed by festival head Sandro Bianconi and program director Freddy Buache, head of the Swiss Film Archive in Lausanne, who both felt that the shift would make the festival too commercial. This was their last year as organizers. Following the festival, both resigned.

As usual for the time period at film festivals, youths clashed with some directors over the political importance of film and spectators argued in open panels with some directors, including actor Michal Simon over his film La Maison which dealt with aging.

Four Golden Leopards, the festival's top prize, were awarded at the festival to four films: This Transient Life directed by Akio Jissoji, Lilika directed by Branko Piesa, Soleil O by Med Hondo, End of the Road directed by Aram Avakian.

== Jury ==
Jury consisted of filmmakers Robert Lapoujade, Alain Tanner, Desire Ecare, Matjaz Klopcic, Vladimir Naumov.

== Official Sections ==
The following films were screened in these sections:

=== Main Program ===
Feature Films In Competition / Main Program

Original Title	English Title	Director(s)	Year	Production Country
Biladi - Une Revolution	Biladi - A Revolution	Francis Reusser		Switzerland
Dr. Med. Sommr Ii	Dr. Med. Summer II	Lothar Warneke	1970	Germany
Ecce Homo Homolka	Behold Homolka	Jaroslav Papousek	1969	Czech Republic
El Mumiaa	The Night of Counting the Years	Chadi Abdel Salam		United Arab Emirates
Elitetroupe: Fleur De Marie		Oimel Mai		Germany
Gradiva	Material	Giorgio Albertazzi	1970	Italia
Iconostatis		Todor Dinov	1969	Bulgaria
La Hora De Los Niños	The Children's Hour	Arturo Ripstein	1969	Mexico
La Maison	The House	Gérard Brach		France
Le Fou	The Madman	Claude Goretta	1970	Switzerland
Le Portrait De Marianne	The Portrait of Marianne	Daniel Dolgenberg	1970	France
Lilika	Lilies	Branko Piesa	1970	Yugoslavia
Memoria De Helena	Helena Memory	David E. Neves	1969	Brazil
Mersekelt Egöv	Temperate Zone	Zsolt Kézdi-Kovacs	1970	Hungary
Mujo	This Transient Life	Akio Jissoji	1970	Japan
Olimpia Agli Amici	Olimpia to Friends	Adriano Aprà	1970	Italia
Pre Mic Pentru Um Razboi Atit De Mare	Too Little for Such a Big War	Radu Gabrea	1969	Romania
Saint-Denis Dans Le Temps	Saint-Denis in Time	Marcel Carrière	1970	Canada
Sarah Akash	The Whole Sky	Basu Chatterji	1969	India
Skzice Warszawskie	Warsaw Sketches	Henryk Kluba	1970	Poland
Smil Emil	Smile, Emil	Jesper Hom	1969	Denmark
Soleil O		Med Hondo	1967	France, Mauritania
The End Of The Road		Aram Avakian		USA
Thomas	Thomas and the Bewitched	Pupi Avati		Italia
Vludlennye	Vlver	Elio Ishmuhamedov		Russia

Short Films In Competition / Main Program

Original Title	English Title	Director(s)	Year	Production Country
A Mozi	The Cinema	Bela Vajda		Hungary
A Note From Above		Deren Philips		Great Britain
A Retired Love		Allen Kates		Canada
A Tojas	The Egg	Bela Vajda		Hungary
Airport		Deren Philips		Great Britain
Aleph		Ernst Reinboth, Michael Schwarze		Germany
Alunissons		Gisèle et Ernest Ansorge, Ernest Ansorge		Switzerland
Ars Gratia Artis	Technique of Trade	Dušan Vukotić		Yugoslavia
Atmospheres		Ernst Reinboth		Germany
Bieg	Run	Bohdan Kosinski		Poland
Capriccio	Whim	Zoltán Huszárik		Hungary
Centipede		Jules Engel		USA
Continents Sans Visa: Addicts		Christian Mottier		Switzerland
El Desafio	The Challenge	Enrique Juarez		Argentina
Hello Hell		Esam El Magraby		United Arab Emirates
Hidavata		Bélai Istavan		Hungary
Icaus		Borivoj Dounikovic		Yugoslavia
Jabuka	Apple	Milan Blazekovic		Yugoslavia
Jagger		Stuart Monro		Great Britain
L'Armoire	The Wardrobe	J.P. Moulin		France
La Vista	The View	David Amitin		Argentina
Les Lapins Zaiko Et Baiko	Rabbits Zaiko and Baiko	Gueorgui Tchavdarov		Bulgaria
Link		Derek Boshier		Great Britain
Los Buenos Sentimientos	Good Feelings	Bernardo Borenholtz		Argentina
Maboule		Coe Hoedemann		Canada
Mexican 1000		Jack Copferman		USA
Monajhara	Monjhra	Dominique Dubosc		France
Monstrum	Monster	Rajko Ranfi		Yugoslavia
On The Back Side		Eva Lurati		France
Orator		Dragutin Vunac		Yugoslavia
Ormenis 199 + 69	Ornamed 199 + 69	Markus Imhoof		Switzerland
Per Aspera Ad Astra	For ATTERA in Astra	Nedeliko Dragic		Yugoslavia
Politicals Portraits		Grigori Markopoulos		Germany
Sand Or Peter And The Wolf		Caroline Leaf		USA
The Hoarder		Evelyn Lambart		Canada
Toilettes Pour Le Bal	Ball Toilet	Jean-Marie Deconinck		Belgium
Yes, If You Like		Richard Meyrik		Great Britain

=== Out of Competition (Fuori Concorso) ===
Main Program / Feature Films Out of Competition

Original Title	English Title	Director(s)	Year	Production Country
A Nous Deux France	To Us Two France	Désiré Ecaré	1970	Ivory Coast
Black Out		Jean-Louis Roy	1970	Switzerland
Equinozio	Equinox	Maurizio Ponzi	1970	Italia
James Ou Pas	James or not	Michel Soutter	1970	Switzerland
Ondata Di Calore	Heat Wave	Nelo Risi	1970	Italia
Szerelmesfilm	Lovefilm	Istvan Szabo	1970	Hungary
Wie Zwei Fröhliche Luftschiffer	Like Two Happy Airmen	Karl Dieter Briel		Germany

Main Program / Short Films Out of Competition

Original Title	English Title	Director(s)	Year	Production Country
24 Su 24	24 are 24	Villi Hermann		Switzerland
79 Primaveras	79 Spring	Santiago Alvarez		Cuba
Château De Sable	Sand Castle	A. Vidouguiris		Russia
Coup De Feu	Shot	Didier Baussy		France
Die Landschaftsgärtner	The Landscape Gardeners	Kurt Gloor		Switzerland
Dissonante Zeitreihen	Dissonant Time Series	Hans Peter Kochenrath		Germany
Ego		Bruno Bozzetto		Italia
El Problema De La Carne	The Meat Problem	Mario Handler		Uruguay
Expression		Biren Dass		India
Film Film Film	Movie Movie Movie	Fédor Khitrouk		Russia
Inwazja	Invasion	Stefan Schabenbeck		Poland
Kad Sam Bio Mali Bio Sam Zdrav I Veseo	When I Was Little I Was Healthy and Cheerful	Joze Pagacnik		Yugoslavia
Liber Arce /Lieberarse		Mario Handler, Mario Jacob		Uruguay
Me Gustan Los Estudiantes	I Like Students	Mario Handler		Uruguay
Panopticum		Miroslaw Kijowicz		Poland
She Is Like A Rainbow		Anton Kotuys		Netherlands

=== Special Sections ===
==== Off-Program Films ====
Off-Program Films
Original Title	English Title	Director(s)	Year	Production Country
1933		Joyce Wieland		Canada
Alone		Bob Cowan	1969	Canada
Cinetude Ii		Keith Rodan	1969	Canada
Des Corps Nus Ou La Vie Est Ronde	Naked Bodies where Life is Round	Hugues Tremblay	1970	Canada
Earth Song		Bob Cowan	1970	Canada
Inauguration		Al Razoutis	1969	Canada
Jangleflex		Bob Cowan	1969	Canada
Maltese Cross Movement		Keewatin Dewdney	1967	Canada
Surfacing On The Thames		David Rimmer	1970	Canada
Tercer Mundo - Tercera Guerra Mundial	Third World - Third World War	Julio García Espinosa		Cuba
The Dance		David Rimmer	1970	Canada
Variations On A Cellophane Wrapper		David Rimmer	1970	Canada
Vroom		Clovis Durand	1970	Canada

==== Tribute To Claude Autant-Lara ====
Tribute To Claude Autant-Lara
Original Title	English Title	Director(s)	Year	Production Country
Ciboulette		Claude Autant-Lara	1933	France
Douce	Gentle	Claude Autant-Lara	1943	France
En Cas De Malheur	In Case of Misfortune	Claude Autant-Lara	1958	France
Fait-Divers	Diverse	Claude Autant-Lara	1923	France
L'Auberge Rouge	The Red Auberge	Claude Autant-Lara	1951	France
La Jument Verte	The Green Mare	Claude Autant-Lara	1959	France
La Traversée de Paris	The Crossing of Paris	Claude Autant-Lara	1956	France
Le Ble En Herbe	The Grass Ble	Claude Autant-Lara	1953	France
Le Bois Des Amants	The Wood of Lovers	Claude Autant-Lara	1960	France
Le Diable Au Corps	The Devil to the Body	Claude Autant-Lara	1946	France
Le Journal D'Une Femme En Blanc	The Newspaper of a Woman in White	Claude Autant-Lara	1965	France
Le Rouge Et Le Noir	Red and Black	Claude Autant-Lara	1954	France
Les Patates	Potatoes	Claude Autant-Lara	1969	France
Les Sept Peches Capitaux, Sixième Sketch: L'Orgueil	The Seven Capital Features, Sixth Sketch: Pride	Claude Autant-Lara	1952	France
Marguerite De La Nuit	Night Marguerite	Claude Autant-Lara	1955	France
Occupe-Toi D'Amelie	Take Care of Amelie	Claude Autant-Lara	1949	France
Tu Ne Tueras Point	You Won't Kill	Claude Autant-Lara		France
Une Famme En Blanc Se Revolte	A Woman in White Revolts	Claude Autant-Lara	1966	France

== Official Awards ==
=== International Jury ===
- Golden Leopard, feature films: This Transient Life by Akio Jissoji, LILIKA by Branko Piesa, SOLEIL O by Med Hondo, THE END OF THE ROAD by Aram Avakian
- International Jury Mention, feature films: BILADI – UNE REVOLUTION by Francis Reusser
- Silver Leopard, feature films: MERSEKELT EGÖV by Zsolt Kézdi-Kovacs
- Silver Leopard, shorts films: MONSTRUM by Rajko Ranfi

=== Youth Jury ===
- Youth Jury Award, feature films: MERSEKELT EGÖV by Zsolt Kézdi-Kovacs, PRE MIC PENTRU UM RAZBOI ATIT DE MARE by Radu Gabrea, THIS TRANSIENT LIFE by Akio Jissoji, ICONOSTATIS by Todor Dinov
- Youth Jury Mention, feature films: BILADI – UNE REVOLUTION by Francis Reusser, LA HORA DE LOS NIÑOS by Arturo Ripstein
- Youth Jury Award, short films: LA VISTA by David Amitin,ARS GRATIA ARTIS by Dusan Vukotic,PER ASPERA AD ASTRA by Nedeliko Dragic,ORATOR by Dragutin Vunac,EL DESAFIO by Enrique Juarez

=== International Cinema Encounters of Sorrento Jury ===
- Golden Cameo: Giorgio Albertazzi in GRADIVA,LE FOU by Claude Goretta
