= Catherine Howe =

English singer-songwriter (born 1950)

- Born: Catherine Howe; 17 May 1950 (age 75); Halifax, West Yorkshire, England
- Known for: Singer-songwriter, actor, television presenter
- Website: catherinehowe.co.uk

Catherine Howe (born 17 May 1950, Halifax, England) is an English singer-songwriter. She is an Ivor Novello Award winner who has earned critical acclaim in dozens of music magazines both in the UK and the US, including Folk Album of the Year from The Sunday Times.

Howe began an acting career in the late 1960s, and has since gained a following in folk music: Record Collector in 2007 called her "one of the great unrecognised voices". Observer Music in 2007 said "Catherine Howe was a Kate Bush before her time".

== 1960s–1970s: early career ==
Howe trained as an actress at the Corona Drama School in London. She commenced an acting career in the late 1960s, performing in contemporary television dramas such as Z-Cars, The Wednesday Play, Doctor Who, Undermind and Dixon of Dock Green. Howe went on to appear in Barney Platts-Mills' film, Private Road. In 1970 Howe met Andrew Cameron Miller, an executive at Reflection, a subsidiary of CBS Records, resulting in her recording her debut album What A Beautiful Place at Trident Studios in London, in February 1971. Miller paired Howe with Bobby Scott, an American pianist and record producer who had previously co-written The Hollies' "He Ain't Heavy, He's My Brother". However Reflection ceased to trade when the album was on the point of release, and as a result it remained largely unheard until it was reissued in 2007 on the Numero label. The re-release met with critical acclaim, gaining a five-star review from Observer Music. The master tapes were by then lost, and the re-release was made from an original source copy.

Howe featured on soundtrack recordings in the UK and Europe throughout the 1970s, and provided the lead vocal for Ennio Morricone's theme song "Un genie, deux associés, une cloche" in 1976. She worked with the Italian jazz musician Piero Piccioni, recording two songs for his 1972 film God Under the Skin and singing in an Italian television broadcast with Piccioni two years later. Howe's second LP Harry was released in the UK in 1975 on RCA, for which the title track received an Ivor Novello Award (only the second female recording artist to achieve this) and became enduringly popular on BBC Radio 2. Also in 1974, Howe appeared on film as the singer during the title credits of the British sex farce, Can You Keep It Up for a Week?. RCA released a follow-up album, Silent Mother Nature in 1976, winning Folk Album of the Year from the Sunday Times. A single was released entitled "Until The Morning Comes" written by the Scottish singer/guitarist Dave Kelly and Ray McRiner, and was performed on LWT's Supersonic. The following year, the title tracks of both RCA albums were re-released (together with the aforementioned single) on the EP The Truth of the Matter, and was one of the Top 75 selling EPs of 1977. Throughout that year Howe produced and sang the songs for BBC Television's That's Life!. Howe's fourth album came two years later, Dragonfly Days, released on Ariola Records. Dragonfly Days featured the "Creme de La Creme" of English session musicians including drummer Peter Boita and the guitarist Alan Parker amongst others. Ariola also released singles by Howe prior to and following the album, some of which are not included on the LP, and promoted as far away as South America. The third single "Quietly and Softly" also featured as the B-side to "Switchboard" by Georg Kajanus' group "April Love". One was with Mike Batt, Howe's self-penned "Sit Down And Think Again", another was a cover of Carole King's "Goin' Back" produced by Pip Williams. Dragonfly Days remains her only record not reissued on CD. Howe also contributed vocals to two tracks for an album by Michael Giles of King Crimson, Progress, recorded in 1978 but unreleased until 2002. In 1979, the BBC transmitted Rhythm on 2: Catherine Howe and Judie Tzuke, a live concert at Ipswich's Corn Exchange. The following year, again for the BBC, Howe featured on both the Jeremy Taylor and Sacha Distel shows.

== 1980s–present: respite and return to music ==
None of Howe's albums sold in large quantity in their time, and after Dragonfly Days, she decided to retire from the music industry. Howe explained in her own words on the tradmusic.com website: "Despite promotion and tours with Andy Fairweather-Low, Chris de Burgh, David Soul and later with Randy Edelman, the albums and singles didn't sell enough. I thought it was because of me, but it was as much (I've since learned) because they weren't in the shops to buy. To remedy this it was suggested that maybe I should write 'country and western', maybe I should change my hair, maybe wear black leather. So the music business, which I loved, and I parted company. Like a bad marriage, some damage was sustained before separation took place...." There was some activity in the 1980s with a re-issue of the "Harry" single in 1984 (due to public demand with the birth of Prince Harry). A year later, Howe contributed two songs to the Sounds of Yorkshire LP: a re-recording of "Lucy Snow" ("Lucy Snowe") from the Silent Mother Nature album; and a new piece in a traditional vein, "Yorkshire Hills". In 1989 Howe had a daughter, Jenny, and later earned a first class degree in History and Religion from the Open University.

In 2002, the Michael Giles album Progress was released on CD: Howe contributed vocals for tracks Sunset and Arrival. In the same year, Howe returned to solo recording: producing a new CD, her fifth, Princelet Street. It coincided with the launch of an official website and preceded the re-issue of her 1970s albums What a Beautiful Place (with The Numero Group), Harry (with BGO) and Silent Mother Nature (with BGO). Of Princelet Street, Howe wrote:

My great-grandmother Susannah Constantine was born on Princelet Street in 1851, her mother worked as a silk winder, her father as a fancy comb maker. Lots of my family lived in or near the City of London in the early 1800s, and even before I knew this I used to go city walking there as a girl because it felt like coming home. Princelet Street the album is inspired by the street and a sense of family, past and present, and as I enjoyed writing and recording its songs I hope you'll enjoy hearing them....

Catherine Howe continues to work on new recordings, also giving occasional live performances. As an author, Howe's book on the life of the 19th-century secularist George Holyoake was published by History into Print in 2012. A second book focused on the radical history of her home town of Halifax. In 2020, London Story 1848 was published. Catherine Howe has also contributed verse and lyrics for publication in themed editions of Playerist Poetry Magazine.

== Discography ==
Studio albums

- What a Beautiful Place – 1971
- Harry – 1975
- Silent Mother Nature – 1976
- Dragonfly Days – 1979
- Princelet Street – 2005
- English Tale – with Vo Fletcher, 2010
- Because It Would Be Beautiful – 2015

Original soundtracks, compilation albums and re-releases

- Il dio sotto la pelle OST – 1972
- Un genie, deux associes, une cloche OST – 1976
- Sounds of Yorkshire (compilation) – 1985 (Contributes two tracks)
- Progress (Michael Giles album, 1978) – 2002 (Vocals for two tracks)
- Harry / Silent Mother Nature Re-mastered CD – 2006
- What a Beautiful Place Remastered CD, with previously unreleased demo track – 2007
- What a Beautiful Place Remastered LP, with previously unreleased demo track – 2010

Singles and EPs

- "Nothing More Than strangers" / "My Child" – Reflection, 1971
- "Firestar Express" / "Forse eri tu" / "St. Francis in Katmandu" – CBS, Italian release with Piero Piccioni, 1974
- "Harry" / "When The Sparrow Flies" – RCA, 1974
- "What Are Friends for Anyway?" / "Keep Me Talking" – RCA, 1976
- "Freedom Enough" / "Lucy Snow" – RCA, 1976
- "Until The Morning Comes" / "Lucy Snow" – RCA, 1976
- "The Truth of the Matter" EP – "Until The Morning Comes" / "Harry" / "Silent Mother Nature" – RCA, 1977
- "Sit Down and Think Again" / "Someone's Got to Love You Sometime" – Ariola, produced by Mike Batt, 1978
- "Move On Over" / "Too Far Gone" – Ariola, 1978
- "Turn The Corner Singing" / "Too Far Gone" – Ariola, 1979
- "Quietly and Softly" / "Daylight" – Ariola, 1979
- "Switchboard" (April Love) / "Quietly and Softly" (Catherine Howe) – Ariola, 1979
- "When The Night Comes" / "How Does Love Feel?" – Ariola, 1980
- "Goin' Back" / "How Does Love Feel?" – Ariola, 1980
- "Almost Love" (vocal version of Inside Moves theme) / "Inside Moves" theme (instrumental) – Breeze, 1981
- "Harry" / "When The Sparrow Flies" – RCA, reissue in blue and gold sleeve, 1984
- "In the Hot Summer" / "Let's Keep it Quiet Now" – Numero, 2010
- "Going Home" EP / "Nothing Love Does Surprises Me" / "White Winter Hymnal" – with Vo Fletcher, Proper Music, 2010

== Theme songs ==
- "It's Possible," title track from God Under the Skin [Il dio sotto la pelle] (1972)

Composer: Piero Piccioni / Director: Folco Quilici

- "Firestar Express" from an Italian TV show, with Piero Piccioni (1974)

Composer: Piero Piccioni

- "Keep It For Me," title track from Can You Keep It Up for a Week? (1974)

Composer: Ted Dicks and Hazel Adair / Director: Jim Atkinson

- "Glory, Glory, Glory," theme song from A Genius, Two Friends and an Idiot [Un genio, due compari, un pollo] (1975)

Composer: Ennio Morricone / Director: Damiano Damiani

== Selected film and television appearances ==
- Dixon of Dock Green as Janet Sutcliffe – 1966 (TV)
- Doctor Who as Ara in the serial The Underwater Menace – 1967 (TV)
- The Wednesday Play as Graziella – 1967 (TV)
- Z-Cars as Jenny Fisher – 1971 (TV)
- Private Road as Iverna – 1971 (film)
- Firestar Express – Italian broadcast with Piccioni and l'Orchestra Racconta – 1974 (TV)

== Bibliography ==
- George Jacob Holyoake's Journey of 1842 (Howe, C, 2012) History into Print ISBN 978-1-85858-340-2
- Halifax 1842: A Year of Crisis (Howe, C, 2014) Breviary Stuff Publications ISBN 978-0-9570005-8-2
