= Private Road =

1971 British film by Barney Platts-Mills

- DVD cover
- Directed by: Barney Platts-Mills
- Written by: Barney Platts-Mills
- Produced by: Barney Platts-Mills; Andrew St. John
- Starring: Susan Penhaligon; Bruce Robinson
- Cinematography: Adam Barker-Mill
- Edited by: Jonathan Gili
- Music by: David Dundas; Michael Feast; George Fenton
- Production company: Maya Films
- Distributed by: Maya Films
- Release date: 30 September 1971 (London)
- Running time: 89 minutes
- Country: United Kingdom
- Language: English
- Budget: £26,000

Private Road is a 1971 British drama film directed and written by Barney Platts-Mills and starring Susan Penhaligon and Bruce Robinson. It was Platts-Mills second feature, following his debut Bronco Bullfrog (1970).

== Plot ==
Peter Morrisey is an author who has just published his first novel. He meets receptionist Ann Halpern and falls in love. They spend some time in a cottage in Scotland living an idyllic pastoral life, then return to London.

Peter gets a job at an advertising agency as a copywriter. Ann becomes pregnant and Peter asks her to marry him but she refuses. To Peter's shock, Ann decides to have an abortion without talking to him about it first. After a spell in hospital Ann returns home and her father gives her a house. Peter returns to his flat alone, still thinking that he will marry Ann.

With his friend Stephen, Peter breaks into an office block and steals a typewriter so he can resume his writing career.

== Cast ==
- Susan Penhaligon as Ann Halpern
- Bruce Robinson as Peter Morrissey
- Michael Feast as Stephen
- Robert Brown as Mr. Halpern
- George Fenton as Henry
- Kathleen Byron as Mrs. Halpern
- Patricia Cutts as Erica Talbot
- Trevor Adams as Alex Marvel
- Susan Brodrick as Sylvia Halpern (credited as Susan Broderick)
- Paul Harper as Clarke
- Catherine Howe as Iverna
- Roger Hammond as 1st advertising executive
- John Keogh as 2nd advertising executive
- Robert Sessions as 3rd advertising executive
- Joanna Ross as Mrs Talbot's secretary
- Pamela Moiseiwitsch as office secretary
- Julia Wright as nurse

== Production ==
Platts-Mills got the idea for the script from an F. Scott Fitzgerald story.

According to the BFI, the movie "was a conscious effort to fit with the more mainstream, commercial filmmaking model than Bronco was" and the filmmakers determined to release it themselves.

Shooting mostly took place in Notting Hill and Westbourne Grove. Filming was completed by October 1970.

== Release ==
The film had its debut in a Notting Hill cinema on 30 September 1971.

== Reception ==
The Monthly Film Bulletin wrote: "The social milieu has changed since Barney Platts-Mills' last feature film, with suburban Surrey and neo-Bohemian London replacing the East End of Bronco Bullfrog. But if the characters have gone up in the world, Platts-Mills' preoccupation is much the same: is personal freedom worthwhile, or possible, at the cost of social and parental ostracism? As in Bronco Bullfrog, he charts his story as an alternating pattern of escape and frustration. ... It is a tribute to Bruce Robinson's performance, skittish and morose by turns and with a habitual expression of tousled dismay, that the character emerges as both vivid and sympathetic. And despite the use of professional actors, Private Road has much of Bronco Bullfrog's resourceful spontaneity. ... Glances and silences tell as much as dialogue, most notably in the hilariously embarrassing meeting between Ann's parents and Peter's junkie friend. All contribute to the feeling that these are real characters against a real background. In Bronco Bullfrog they virtually were; but in the professional context of Private Road it says much for Platts-Mills own powers of sympathetic observation, his eye for casually revealing tricks of human behaviour."

Variety wrote that Platts-Mills "shows a greater maturity and depth for a film that should get youthful and adult audience interest with careful placement."

Alexander Walker reviewing the film at Cannes called it "lovely, unsentimental, well observed... someone in London show it quickly."

The movie screened at the 1971 Edinburgh Film Festival where the Daily Telegraph praised its "honesty".

Writing in Sight and Sound, critic Penelope Houston gave the film a two-page positive review.

== Accolades ==
The film won the Golden Leopard at the Locarno International Film Festival.

== Home media ==
After several years out of print it was reissued on Blu-ray and DVD by the BFI in 2011 as part of their Flipside reissue program.
