= Tom Kempinski =

British playwright and actor (1938–2023)

- Born: 24 March 1938; Hendon, England
- Died: 2 August 2023 (aged 85)
- Spouses: Margaret Nolan (m. 1967; div. 1972): Frances de la Tour (divorced)

Thomas Michael John Kempinski (24 March 1938 – 2 August 2023) was a British playwright and actor best known for his 1980 play Duet for One, which was a major success in London - though less so in New York City - and much revived since. Kempinski also wrote the screenplay for the film version of Duet for One. In addition, he made minor appearances on numerous British television shows including Dixon of Dock Green and Z-Cars.

== Early life and education ==
Kempinski's parents, Gerhard and Melanie Kempinski, were Jewish restaurateurs and hoteliers who ran the Kempinski hotel in Berlin. They emigrated to London in 1936 as refugees before the Second World War. Kempinski was born in Hendon in 1938 but was evacuated to stay with his paternal grandparents in New York City at the age of 2 to avoid a potential Nazi invasion of England. On return to London, he was educated at Abingdon School from 1951 to 1956. In 1957, he gained a major scholarship in Modern Languages to Gonville and Caius College, Cambridge, but suffered a breakdown and left after only ten weeks, albeit having time to join Footlights in the meantime. After Cambridge, he had a brief spell in the Maudsley Hospital in South London.

== Acting career ==
Kempinski then took up a place at RADA before moving into acting. His first rôle was in The Damned before moving into stage acting with Lionel Bart's Blitz!.

Other stage and film rôles followed, notably in the anti-war play Dingo by Charles Wood and Gumshoe by Stephen Frears.

In May 1968, Kempinski joined the student revolutionaries who occupied Paris's Odéon Theatre as part of "les événements".

== Personal life and death ==
Some sources state that Kempinski was married to the actress Frances de la Tour, who starred in the original London production for Duet for One, whereas his obituary in The Guardian describes de la Tour as his partner. He was married to the actress Margaret Nolan from 1967 to 1972 and to solicitor Sarah Tingay from 1991.

Tom Kempinski died on 2 August 2023, at the age of 85.

== Selected filmography (actor) ==
- The Damned (1962) as Ted
- Do Be Careful Boys (1964) as (voice)
- Othello (1965) as Sailor / senators-soldiers-Cypriots
- Stranger in the House (1967) as shop assistant (uncredited)
- The Whisperers (1967) as 2nd young man
- Mrs. Brown, You've Got a Lovely Daughter (1968) as Hobart
- The Committee (1968) as victim
- Moon Zero Two (1969) as 2nd Officer
- Taste of Excitement (1969) as French Police Officer
- Praise Marx and Pass the Ammunition (1970) as designer
- The Reckoning (1970) as Brunzy
- Doctor in Trouble (1970) as Stedman Green
- The McKenzie Break (1970) as Lt. Schmidt
- Gumshoe (1971) as psychiatrist
- Adult Fun (1972) as plainclothes policeman

== See also ==
- List of Old Abingdonians
