= It's a Bare, Bare World! =

1963 British naturist film by William Lang

- Lobby card
- Directed by: William Lang
- Produced by: Adrienne Fancey
- Starring: Margaret Nolan (as "Vicky Kennedy")
- Narrated by: Monica Scott
- Cinematography: Douglas Hill
- Production company: Antler Film Production
- Distributed by: S F Films
- Release date: 1963
- Running time: 33 mins
- Country: United Kingdom
- Language: English

It's a Bare, Bare World! is a 1963 British second feature naturist short film directed by William Lang and starring Margaret Nolan.

== Plot ==
Vicki and Vera take their friend Carol on a tour around Windsor, and invite her to their nudist club. As it is her first visit, Carol is allowed to remain clothed, but after a while she happily disrobes.

== Cast ==
- Margaret Nolan (credited as Vicki Kennedy)
- Carol Haynes
- Vera Novak
- Denise Martin
- Angela Jones
- Leslie Bainbridge

== Critical reception ==
The Monthly Film Bulletin wrote: "After the usual introductory padding – in this case a tour of Windsor – the main portion of the film is devoted to the usual nudist camp activities of lounging, swimming and ball-games. Many shots of various nudist groups are used time and again; the repetition is irksome ... the commentary is reduced to a minimum; there is no direct dialogue. In short, it is the usual nudist film."
