= Branko Pleša =

Serbian actor (1926–2001)

- Бранко Плеша
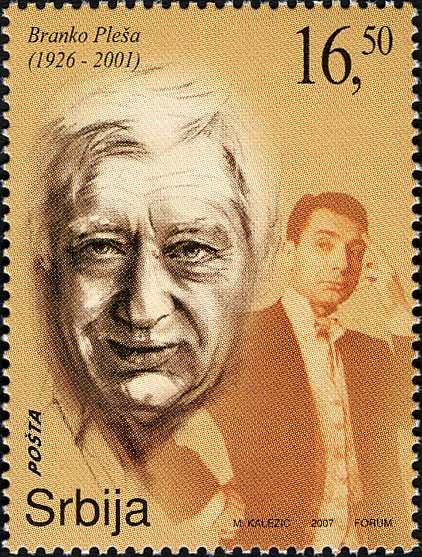
- Branko Pleša on a 2007 Serbian stamp.
- Born: 6 March 1926; Kiseljak, Kingdom of Serbs, Croats, and Slovenes
- Died: 9 June 2001 (aged 75); Belgrade, FR Yugoslavia
- Occupations: Actor, theatre director
- Years active: 1949–1998

Branko Pleša (Serbian Cyrillic: Бранко Плеша; 6 March 1926 – 9 June 2001) was a Serbian actor and theatre director.

He appeared in more than eighty films between 1949 to 1998.

== Filmography ==
Year	Title	Role	Notes
1947	Slavica	Vojnik	Uncredited
1949	Prica o fabrici	Ferdo ... muz Marijin	
1950	Crveni cvet	Ivan	
1953	Daleko je sunce	Pavle	
1955	Lazni car	Knez Dolgorukov	
1955	Pesma sa Kumbare	Beogradski Pasa	
1957	Mali covek	Stole	
1958	Oleko Dundich	Aleksa Dundic	
1958	The Sky Through the Trees	Ranjenik na nosilima (I)	
1959	Vetar je stao pred zoru	Pavle Ugrinovic ... islednik policije	
1960	Akcija	Student	
1960	Partizanske price		(segment "Povratak")
1961	Legge di guerra	Don Stefano	
1961	Square of Violence	Major Kohler	
1964	Zarota		
1964	Vrtlog	Njemacki oficir	(segment "Otac")
1964	March on the Drina	Pukovnik Zdravko Lukic	
1964	Sette a Tebe		
1965	Provereno nema mina	Rade	
1966	Witness Out of Hell	Bora Petrovic	Voice
1967	Bomb at 10:10	Col. Hassler	
1968	Uka i Bjeshkëve të nemura	Italijanski doktor	
1968	Pre istine	Mladen Stojanovic	
1969	Bog je umro uzalud	Narrator	Voice, Uncredited
1969	Zazidani	Strazar	Voice, Uncredited
1970	Lilika	Counsellor	
1970	Bablje ljeto	Michel	
1971	Romance of a Horsethief	Lt. Vishinsky	
1972	The Master and Margaret	Profesor Voland & Satana	(Yugoslavian version), Voice, Uncredited
1974	Death and the Dervish	Kadija	
1974	Hell River	Gen. Steiger	
1979	Partisan Squadron	Von Norden	
1988	The Bizarre Country	Ministar inostranih poslova	
1989	The Meeting Point	Doktor Katic	
1989	Seobe II	Kostjurin	

== See also ==
- List of Serbs
