= Alistair Owen =

British author, journalist, and screen writer

- Occupations: Author; Screenwriter; Journalist
- Writing career
- Language: English
- Notable work: The Mirror and the Road: Conversations with William Boyd
- Website: alistairowenwriter.com

Alistair Owen is a British author, screenwriter, and journalist best known for his in-depth interviews with prominent British writers and screenwriters. His work offers insights into the creative processes of his subjects.

Owen has authored several books that compile interviews with notable figures in literature and screenwriting. His works include:

- Smoking in Bed: Conversations with Bruce Robinson (2001), exploring Bruce Robinson's creative processes and recognized as one of David Hare's Books of the Year in The Guardian.
- Story and Character: Interviews with British Screenwriters (2004), featuring discussions with leading screenwriters including Richard Curtis and Frank Cottrell Boyce.
- Hampton on Hampton (2010), a series of interviews with playwright and screenwriter Christopher Hampton, selected as one of poet Craig Raine's Books of the Year in The Observer.
- The Art of Screen Adaptation: Top Writers Reveal Their Craft (2020), exploring the intricacies of adapting works for the screen and featuring such names as Hossein Amini, Andrew Davies and Nick Hornby.
- The Mirror and the Road: Conversations with William Boyd (2023), offering a comprehensive look into William Boyd's literary journey.

Beyond his interview books, Owen has written original and adapted screenplays and stage plays, collaborating with screenwriters such as Rupert Walters and Jeremy Brock. He has also contributed arts journalism to national newspapers and magazines, including Time Out, The Observer, The Independent on Sunday, and Creative Screenwriting. His first novel, The Vetting Officer, was published in 2020.
