= Hero (1982 film) =

- Directed by: Barney Platts-Mills
- Written by: Barney Platts-Mills
- Produced by: Andrew St. John
- Cinematography: Adam Barker-Mill
- Music by: Jimmy Davidson; Al Fraser; Paul Steen
- Release date: 1982
- Country: United Kingdom
- Language: Scottish Gaelic

Hero is a 1982 British independent adventure-fantasy film written and directed by Barney Platts-Mills. Based on The Pursuit of Diarmuid and Gráinne from the Fenian Cycle of Scottish mythology, the dialogue is spoken entirely in Scottish Gaelic.

The film was entered into the main competition at the 39th edition of the Venice Film Festival.

== Plot ==
Set in medieval Scotland. A young hero joins a band of warriors but becomes enmeshed in a power struggle with their leader.

== Cast ==
- Derek McGuire as Dermid O'Duinne
- Caroline Kenneil as Princess Grannia
- Alastair Kenneil as Finn MacCumhaill
- Stewart Grant as Osin
- Harpo Hamilton as Oscar
