= Margaret Nolan =

English model, actress, and artist (1943–2020)

- Nolan in Goldfinger (1964)
- Born: Margaret Ann Nolan; 29 October 1943; Hampstead, London, England
- Died: 5 October 2020 (aged 76); Belsize Park, London, England
- Other name: Vicky Kennedy
- Occupations: Actress; visual artist; model
- Years active: 1962–2020
- Spouses: Tom Kempinski (m. 1967; div. 1972) Michael O’Sullivan (m. 1974, divorced)
- Partner(s): Colin Deeks (?–2020; her death)
- Children: 2

Margaret Ann Nolan (29 October 1943 – 5 October 2020) was an English actress, visual artist and glamour model. She appeared in Goldfinger, A Hard Day's Night (both 1964) and six Carry On films, and also regularly appeared on screen from the 1960s to the 1980s.

== Early life ==
Margaret Ann Nolan was born on 29 October 1943 in Hampstead, London. Her mother Molly (née O'Sullivan) was an English nurse, and her father Jack was an Irish army clerk. They spent the duration of the Second World War in County Waterford in Ireland until the war ended in 1945, before returning to Hampstead. Nolan began training as a teacher, but began dating Tom Kempinski, who was acting with the National Theatre Company at the time and persuaded her to begin a career in acting.

== Career ==
=== Modelling career ===
Margaret Nolan began her career as a model. As her glamour-modelling career took off, she was briefly known as Vicky Kennedy in the early 1960s.

=== Acting career ===
Nolan reverted to her birth name as soon as she began to find acting roles, appearing in numerous television shows, theatre productions, and films. The last included A Hard Day's Night with the Beatles, Ferry Cross the Mersey with Gerry and the Pacemakers, and Marcel Carné's Three Rooms in Manhattan. Nolan also appeared in one of the first episodes of the television spy thriller The Saint with Roger Moore.

Nolan played the role of Dink, Bond's masseuse, in the James Bond film Goldfinger released in 1964. She was also painted gold and wore a gold bikini for Robert Brownjohn's title-sequence, advertisements, and soundtrack cover (not Shirley Eaton as in the narrative of the film). This led to photographs in Playboy's "James Bond's Girls" edition of November 1965. In the film Carry on at Your Convenience (1971), composer Eric Rogers referenced Nolan's Goldfinger affiliation by using its three-note motif on a close-up of her. Nolan appeared on the front cover of both the US and UK versions of the 2005 book Robert Brownjohn: Sex and Typography. In 2012, Nolan gave her first interview concerning her experiences as the model. Asked if the imagery liberates or celebrates womanhood, Nolan responded:

It does celebrate the physical form. If I'd been nude, it might have been about liberation because up to that point you wouldn't have seen a nude woman in a publicly visible thing like that. I could have been very pretentious and said this is liberating. But because I was dressed-up anyway I didn't get that sense.

It became the first film-title to be shown in installation at MoMA, New York (2012).

On appearing in Michael Pertwee's farce She's Done It Again at London's Garrick Theatre in 1969, Nolan was described as combining "a long list of physical attractions with a talent that has contributed to the success of many films and television plays". She was known for five BBC series with Spike Milligan, and in 2013, she published a short essay on her time working with him. Nolan gave a live reading of the work at the Poetry Society in Covent Garden, reviewed by What's On London as a "deeply personal memoir... her performance simply magical." She spoke of her awareness of Milligan's depressive character, but also of their friendly working relationship, noting, "Professionally, he taught me that timing is what makes things funny. Timing is crucial." Nolan was cast in several Carry On films including Carry on Girls (1973). The film contains the scene of Nolan (in a silver bikini) and Barbara Windsor cat-fighting on a hotel floor.

Nolan also appeared in serious theatre, motivated by political themes. In 2011, Nolan's work as a comedy actress was recognised with her name included on Gordon Young's Comedy Carpet installation in front of Blackpool Tower. Also in 2011, Nolan returned to the screen after a gap of nearly three decades. She starred in a role especially written for her by Ann Cameron, in Yvonne Deutschman's The Power of Three.

In 2019, Edgar Wright cast her in his 2021 film Last Night in Soho. It was Nolan's final film appearance.

=== Art career ===
In 1991, Nolan moved to Andalusia in Spain to a rural farmhouse in the mountains, where she practised permaculture. There, she became a visual artist.

As a visual artist, Nolan produced graphic and sometimes grotesque photomontages assembled from cut-outs of her early publicity photographs. These pieces concern "a unique and personal dialogue intrinsically related to a view of a woman and how a woman is viewed." She exhibited in London at venues including the Brick Lane Gallery (2009), The Misty Moon Gallery (2013) and Gallery Different (2013), whilst a screen-print is held by Kemistry Gallery. In 2007, Nolan moved back to London.

In 2009, early publicity shots of Nolan inspired screenprints by Brighton-based graffiti artist Hutch. Nolan's work in photo-montage was also selected for the front cover of Playerist poetry magazine (No. 2, 2012). In 2013, her artworks featured in the group show equals: exploring feminism through art and conversation at Blankspace Manchester; the press release quoting that: "Her voice carries alongside universal debate on socio-sexual hierarchies in the age of mass media."

== Personal life and death ==
Nolan was married to English playwright Tom Kempinski in 1967 and divorced in 1972. They had two sons.

Nolan died of cancer on 5 October 2020 at her home in Belsize Park, London, at age 76. She had sought to write a memoir with Paul Stenning.

== Filmography ==
Nolan's acting career covers works in television and cinema.

=== Film ===
Year	Title	Role	Notes
1962	One Track Mind	Girl	Short film
1963	It's a Bare, Bare World!	Vicki	Short film. Credited as Vicki Kennedy
1964	The Four Poster	Girl	Short film. Credited as Vicki Kennedy
1964	Saturday Night Out	Julie	
1964	The Beauty Jungle	Rose of England (Caroline)	
1964	A Hard Day's Night	Grandfather's Girl at Casino	Uncredited role
1964	Goldfinger	Dink	Golden girl in the film's titles, on the film's posters and soundtrack album
1964	Ferry Cross the Mersey	Norah	
1965	Three Rooms in Manhattan	June	
1965	Carry On Cowboy	Miss Jones	
1966	Promise Her Anything	Mail-Order Film Girl	
1966	The Great St Trinian's Train Robbery	Susie Naphill	
1967	Bikini Paradise	Margarita	
1968	Witchfinder General	Girl at Inn	Billed as Maggie Nolan in end credits
1968	Don't Raise the Bridge, Lower the River	Spink's Nurse	
1969	Can Heironymus Merkin Ever Forget Mercy Humppe and Find True Happiness?	Little Assistance	
1969	Crooks and Coronets	Girlfriend	Uncredited role
1969	The Best House in London	Busty Prostitute	Uncredited role
1970	Toomorrow	Johnson	
1971	Carry On Henry	Buxom Lass	
1971	Carry On at Your Convenience	Popsy	
1972	Carry On Matron	Mrs. Tucker	
1972	Frenzy	Young Woman	Uncredited role. Scene cut
1973	Class of '44	Girl in Stairwell	Uncredited role
1973	No Sex Please, We're British	Barbara	
1973	Carry On Girls	Dawn Brakes	
1974	Carry On Dick	Lady Daley	
1983	Positions of Power	Elizabeth Nihell	Short film
1986	Sky Bandits	Waitress	
2011	The Power of Three	Dame Margaret	
2021	Last Night in Soho	Sage Barmaid	Posthumous release

=== Television ===
Year	Title	Role	Notes
1963	The Saint	Daisy	Episode: "Iris". Uncredited role
1964	ITV Play of the Week	Space Hostess	Episode: "Deep and Crisp and Stolen"
1965	Danger Man	Mrs. Elliot	Episode: "Parallel Lines Sometimes Meet"
1965	199 Park Lane	Martine	3 episodes
1965	Buddenbrooks	Babette	Episode: "Lengthening Shadows"
1966	Thirty-Minute Theatre	Eve	Episode: "The Enchanted Night"
1966	Hugh and I	Dolly	Episode: "Goodbye Dolly"
1966	The World of Wooster	Mabel	Episode: "Jeeves Exerts the Old Cerebellum"
1966	Theatre 625	Fantasy Girl	Episode: "A Man Like That"
1966	Take a Pair of Private Eyes	Doreen	3 episodes
1966	The Newcomers	Mercedes	17 episodes
1966	The Bed-Sit Girl	(unknown)	1 episode
1966	Adam Adamant Lives!	Sadie	Episode: "More Deadly Than the Sword"
1966	On the Margin	(unknown)	1 episode
1967	Armchair Theatre	Au Pair	Episode: "Compensation Alice"
1967	After Many a Summer	Girl	Television film. Uncredited role
1967	The Wednesday Play	Margie	Episode: "Death of a Private"
1968	Ooh La La!	(unknown)	Episode: "All Night Sitting"
1968	The Morecambe & Wise Show	(unknown)	1 episode
1968	Nearest and Dearest	Nemone Moore	Episode: "Take a Letter"
1968	Mystery and Imagination	Vampire	Episode: "Dracula" (1968). Credited as Marie Legrand
1968–1969	The World of Beachcomber	(unknown)	4 episodes
1969	World in Ferment	Various roles	1 episode
1969	Run a Crooked Mile	Secretary	Television film. Uncredited role
1970	The Adventures of Don Quick	Dulcie	Episode: "The Benefits of Earth"
1970	Brian Rix Presents...	Melissa	Episode: "Clutterbuck"
1971	Brian Rix Presents...	Pat Thompson	Episode: "Reluctant Heroes"
1971	Brian Rix Presents...	Sylvia	Episode: "She's Done It Again!"
1971	The Persuaders!	Sophie	Episode: "Element of Risk"
1971	Mr. Tumbleweed	Leading Huntress	Television film
1971–1972	Budgie	Inga the Stripper	3 episodes
1972	Steptoe and Son	Nemone Wagstaff	Episode: "A Star Is Born"
1972	Funny You Should Say That	(unknown)	1 episode
1972	New Scotland Yard	Gudrun Lindblom	Episode: "Evidence of Character"
1972	My Wife Next Door	Myra	Episode: "Pregnant Moment"
1973	Whatever Happened to the Likely Lads?	Jackie	Episode: "I'll Never Forget Whatshername"
1973	Crown Court	Angela Mercer	Serial: "Crime in Prison"
1973	The Moon Shines Bright on Charlie Chaplin	Stella	Television film
1973	Black and Blue	Lynda Cherry	Episode: "The Middle-of-the-Road Roadshow for All the Family"
1973	Men of Affairs	Gloria	Episode: "Horseface"
1973	Last of the Summer Wine	Connie	Episode: "Pâté and Chips"
1974	Late Night Drama	Gillian	Episode: "M + M"
1975	The Sweeney	Betty	Episode: "Thin Ice"
1975	Q6	Various characters	3 episodes
1976	I Didn't Know You Cared	Barmaid	Episode: "The Way My Wife Looks at Me"
1980	Fox	Sheila Fox	3 episodes
1981	Brideshead Revisited	Effie	Episode: "The Bleak Light of Day"
1981	Charlie Was a Rich Man	(unknown)	Television film
1983	Crown Court	Frances O'Reilly	Episode: "A Sword in the Hand of David: Part One"
1983	Crossroads	Denise Paget	14 episodes

== Theatre ==
=== Fringe ===
- Why Bournemouth? (1968)
- It Has No Choice
- A Minor Scene
- Homo
- Stimulation
- Super Santa
- How the Vote Was Won (1986)
- Daughters of Men (1986)

=== Provincial ===
- The Bacchae (1970)
- Bus Stop (Cherie) (1970)
- Who Goes Bare (1970)
- Murder in the Office (1972)
- Not Now, Darling (1973)
- Don't Look Now (1974)
- Under the Hill (Aubrey Beardsley) (1976)

=== West End ===
- The Giveaway (1969)
- Adam's Apple (1970)
- She's Done It Again (1970)

== Bibliography ==
- Hadoke, T (2020) Margaret Nolan obituary Guardian Media Group ISSN 0261-3077
- King, E (2005) Robert Brownjohn: Sex and Typography 1925–1970 UK: King ISBN 185669464X. US: Princeton ISBN 1568985509
- Mele, C (2020) Margaret Nolan, ‘Goldfinger’ Actress, Dies at 76 The New York Times Company ISSN 0362-4331
- Ross, R (1996) The Carry On Companion Batsford ISBN 0713479671
- Ross, R (1999) 'Carry On' Uncensored Boxtree ISBN 0752217984
- Ross, R (2011) 'Carry On' Actors Apex ISBN 1906358958
- Sheridan, R (2007) Keeping the British End Up: Four Decades of Saucy Cinema Reynolds and Hearn ISBN 0857682792
- Slidel, M (2012) Margaret Nolan Interview Playerist No. 2, Martin Slidel ISSN 2048-2515
- Snelgrove, K (2008) Official Carry On Facts, Figures and Statistics Apex ISBN 1906358095
- Webber, R (2008) Fifty Years of Carry On Century ISBN 1844138437
- 38 26 34 – Vol 09 No 02 (1972) Margaret Nolan as Vicki Kennedy – Pages 42–47
