= Slap the Monster on Page One =

- Italian film poster
- Directed by: Marco Bellocchio
- Screenplay by: Sergio Donati; Goffredo Fofi
- Story by: Sergio Donati
- Produced by: Ugo Tucci
- Starring: Gian Maria Volonté; Fabio Garriba; Jacques Herlin; Laura Betti
- Cinematography: Erico Menczer; Luigi Kuveiller
- Edited by: Ruggero Mastroianni
- Music by: Nicola Piovani
- Production companies: Jupiter Generale Cinematografica; UTI Produzioni Associate; Labrador Films
- Distributed by: Euro International Films (Italy); Fox-Lira (France)
- Release date: 19 October 1972
- Running time: 93 minutes
- Countries: Italy; France
- Language: Italian

Slap the Monster on Page One (Italian: Sbatti il mostro in prima pagina) is a 1972 Italian political thriller directed by Marco Bellocchio.

== Background ==
The film began with Sergio Donati as director but after a week of shooting, Bellocchio took over in order to turn it, with the assistance of film critic Goffredo Fofi, from an Italian western to a political thriller, inducting in the cast actress Laura Betti. By 1969, Bellocchio was an active member of the maoist Italian (Marxist–Leninist) Communist Party and his film work was often commissioned by the party, including the "Monster," and documentaries such as Viva il 1o Maggio rosso e proletario ("Long Live the Red and Proletarian 1st of May", 1970) or Il popolo calabrese ha rialzato la testa ("The Calabrese people have raised their heads again").

Eventually, the film was assessed by a critic as a rather "generic product" of the so-called cinema civile ("civil cinema") sub-genre. Still, these films represent a small portion of the director's output.

== Plot ==
The film depicts the daily life of a fictitious Italian daily newspaper, Il Giornale ("The Journal"). The newspaper caters to a conservative, fascist, bourgeois readership. Its chief-editor Bizanti gives a right-wing slant to the most trivial news items, while at the same time sweetening the thornier issues, such as unemployment and police brutality. The editorial staff is thrown in a tantrum when a young girl is found raped and killed, going as far as soliciting nostalgia for the death penalty. (Note: Capital punishment was abolished in Italy in the wake of the fall of Italian Fascism) The paper derails the investigation, leading the police to a false culprit: a young left-wing student, who becomes a scapegoat for the newspaper's readership. The movie closes with public opinion mesmerized by Bizanti and his staff to the satisfaction of their backers and financiers.

== Cast ==
- Gian Maria Volonté as Bizanti
- Laura Betti as Rita Zigai
- Fabio Garriba as Roveda
- John Steiner as Montelli
- Corrado Solari as Mario Boni
- Jacques Herlin as Lauri
- Carla Tatò as Bizanti's Wife
- Marco Bellocchio
- Michel Bardinet as Vanzina
- Jean Rougeul
- Gianni Solaro
- Enrico DiMarco
- Silvia Kramar
- Massimo Patrone as the actual murderer
- Luigi Antonio Guerra
