= Amy McAllister =

Irish actress

Amy McAllister is an Irish actress, most notable for her role as Mary in the BBC drama Call the Midwife. She appeared in Breeders alongside Martin Freeman for Sky One and in A Discovery of Witches which also stars Matthew Goode and Alex Kingston. Other credits include the BAFTA winning BBC/Merman comedy-drama There She Goes with Jessica Hynes and David Tennant, Victorian detective drama Miss Scarlet and the Duke for UKTV and PBS, Witless for BBC Three and the Stephen Frears film Philomena, which stars Steve Coogan and Judi Dench.

== Background ==
McAllister grew up in Dublin, Ireland. She trained at the Guildhall School of Music and Drama, where productions included Live Like Pigs directed by Christian Burgess and performed at the Royal Court Theatre in Sloane Square.

== Career ==
McAllister has worked extensively in theatre, television, film, and voiceover since graduating from the Guildhall. Recent work includes Zak Zarafshan's critically-acclaimed The Boys Are Kissing, Chicken Run: Dawn of the Nugget with Thandiwe Newton, Scorch by Stacey Gregg (Summerhall Best Actor Award, Fringe First Award, Best New Play at the Irish Times Theatre Awards), Forever Yours Marie-Lou at Theatre Royal, Bath, Hecuba by Marina Carr at the Royal Shakespeare Company, Shadow of a Gunman at the Abbey Theatre (Irish Times Theatre Awards nomination for Best Supporting Actress), Sons Without Fathers at the Arcola Theatre, White Rabbit Red Rabbit at Live Theatre, Horse Piss For Blood by Kneehigh Theatre writer Carl Grose, No Man's Land, performed in Berlin and in the UK, and The Cherry Orchard, adapted by Tom Stoppard, in which she played the role of Anya.

In 2008, she was highly praised by theatre critics for her performance as Hilde Wangel in The Lady from the Sea, also at the Birmingham Repertory Theatre.

In 2010, she appeared as autistic savant Fanny Haddock in the five star production of A Northern Odyssey, by Shelagh Stephenson. She took on the role of Lyra in the 2009 stage adaptation of Phillip Pullman's His Dark Materials, in a co-production with the Birmingham Repertory Theatre and the West Yorkshire Playhouse.

== Credits ==
Film credits include the Oscar-nominated Philomena, Ruby Strangelove, and romantic comedy For Love Or Money. She has appeared on television as teenage runaway Mary in BBC drama Call the Midwife, as cancer patient Annabelle Taylor in BBC drama Holby City, as Ruth in The Great Fire, and as Della Morgan in Doctors. McAllister's other theatre work includes Brighton Beach Memoirs, The Lion, the Witch, and the Wardrobe, Don Juan Comes Back from the War, The Tinker's Wedding, and The Way Home by award-winning writer Chloe Moss.

== Other work ==
McAllister is also a rising star of the London poetry scene. She is a recent UK Anti-slam Champion, has won multiple poetry slams across Europe, and holds the Farrago Zoo Award for Best Feature Debut. Her first poetry collection Are You As Single As That Cream? was published by Burning Eye and her work also appears in Rhyming Thunder, South Bank Poetry Magazine, The Pop Up Anthology, Playerist Poetry Magazine, and Outwest. She has performed alongside John Hegley, John Cooper Clarke, Inua Ellams, Gerry Potter, Phill Jupitus, and Howard Marks and was one of forty leading female poets selected to read Sylvia Plath's Ariel at the Southbank Centre for the 50th anniversary of her death.
