= The Mirror and the Road =

2023 book by Alistair Owen

The Mirror and the Road: Conversations with William Boyd
- Author: Alistair Owen
- Publisher: Penguin Books
- Publication date: 2023
- Pages: 360
- ISBN: 978-0-241-98733-9

The Mirror and the Road: Conversations with William Boyd is a nonfiction book by British author and interviewer Alistair Owen, published by Penguin Books in November 2023. The work presents interviews with novelist William Boyd about his literary career, creative processes, and personal experiences.

== Background and content ==
Conducted over 33 hours via Zoom during the COVID-19 lockdown, the interviews were initially intended to commemorate Boyd's 70th birthday in 2022. The discussions delve into Boyd's extensive body of work, encompassing 17 novels, five short story collections, 12 films, five television series, and three stage plays. The conversations also touch upon Boyd's early unpublished writings and his experiences in the film industry.

The book is structured chronologically, tracing Boyd's evolution as a writer from his debut novel A Good Man in Africa (1981), through subsequent successes like, Brazzaville Beach (1990), and Any Human Heart (2002) concluding with The Romantic (2022). Owen's apparent familiarity with Boyd's oeuvre facilitate discussions on the themes, inspirations, and challenges underlying his work.

== Reception ==
Critical response to The Mirror and the Road has been largely positive.

Writing in The Observer, Alex Preston, whilst a little put off by the hagiographic tone of the book finds that, "Owen is excellent too at getting Boyd to speak about his “whole-life" novels, the way they move through narrative time, the deep research and planning involved in plotting and drafting them" and concludes that, "In the end, the book is – somewhat surprisingly – a huge success, showing Boyd as a warm, generous and thoughtful man, and shining a light on a body of work that, despite all the plaudits and prizes, feels as if it doesn't get quite the recognition it deserves".

Nick Duerden in iNews describes the book as, "A genuinely fascinating insight into the creative process" and observes that "Boyd emerges as engaging an interviewee as he is a literary powerhouse".

Martin Chilton in The Independent made it one of his books of the month in November 2023, describing the book as, "a fascinating insight into a writer looking at his own trade" and concluding that "the book will obviously have great appeal to fans of Boyd – and literary interviews in general – and his opinions are erudite, enlightening and often amusing".
