= Bruce Robinson =

British screenwriter and film director (born 1946)

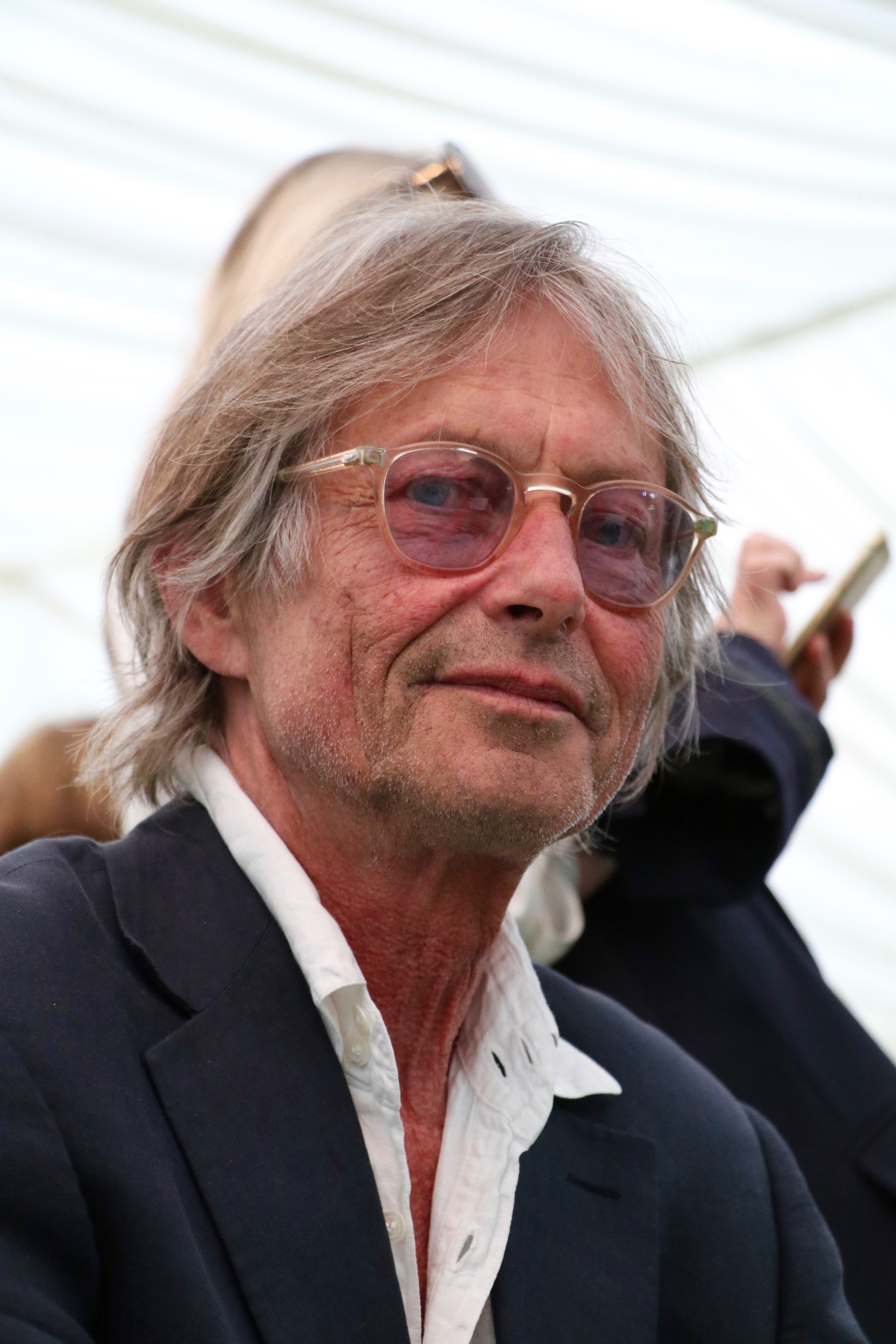
- Robinson in 2016
- Born: 2 May 1946 (age 80); London, England
- Education: Royal Central School of Speech and Drama
- Occupations: Actor; screenwriter; director
- Years active: 1967–present
- Spouse: Sophie Windham (m. 1984)
- Partner(s): Lesley-Anne Down (1969–1979)
- Children: 2
- Awards: BAFTA Award for Best Adapted Screenplay; 1984 The Killing Fields

Bruce Robinson (born 2 May 1946) is an English actor, director, screenwriter and novelist. He wrote and directed Withnail and I (1987), a film with comic and tragic elements set in London in the late 1960s, which drew on his experiences as a struggling actor, living in poverty in Camden Town. He was nominated for the Academy Award for Best Adapted Screenplay for The Killing Fields (1984).

As an actor, he has worked with Franco Zeffirelli, Ken Russell and François Truffaut.

== Early life ==
Bruce Robinson was born in London. He grew up in Broadstairs, Kent, where he attended the Charles Dickens Secondary Modern School. His parents were Mabel Robinson and American lawyer Carl Casriel, who had a short-term relationship during World War II. His father was a Lithuanian Jew. As a child, Robinson was constantly brutally abused by his stepfather Rob (a former RAF navigator and a wholesale newsagent), who knew the boy was not his son. He had an elder sister Elly, whom he asked to teach him some French.

== Film career ==
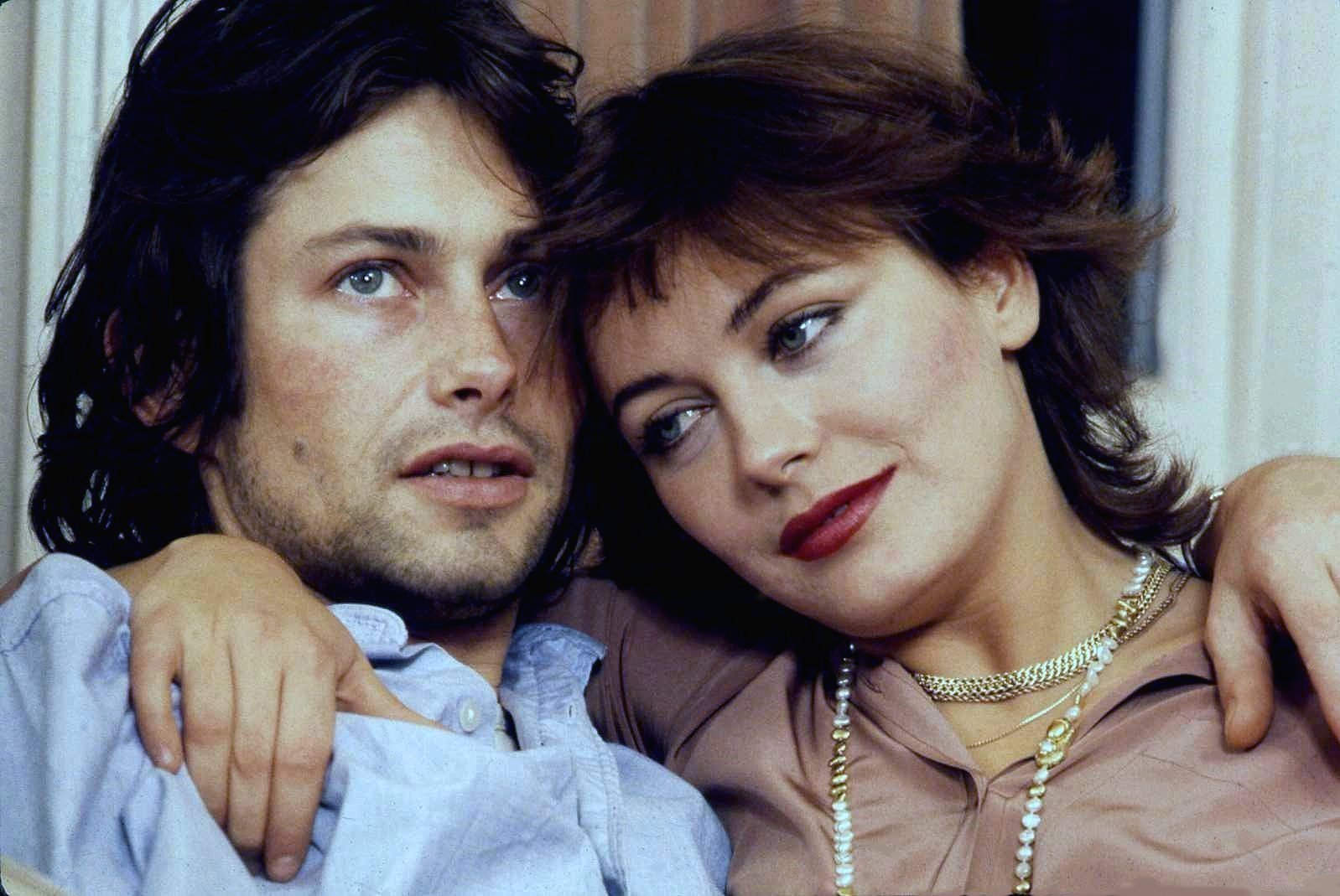
Bruce Robinson and Lesley-Anne Down in the late 1970s

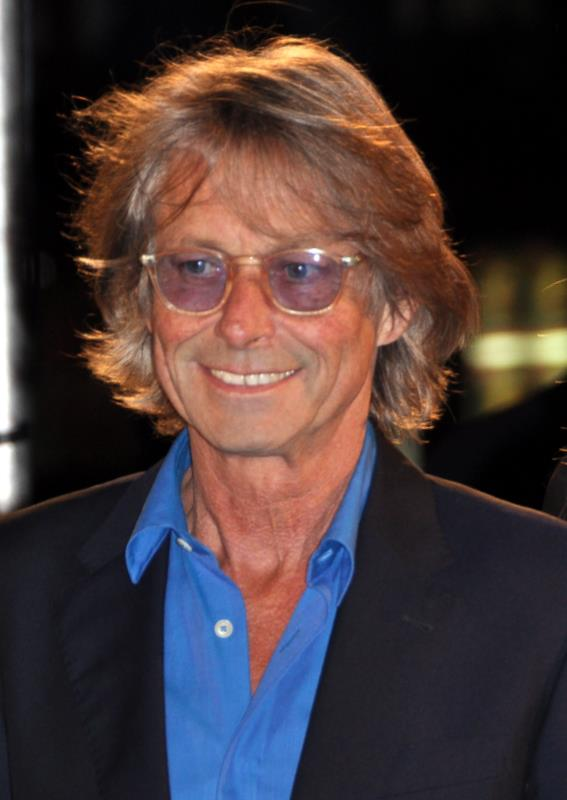
Robinson at the premiere of The Rum Diary

In his youth, Robinson aspired to be an actor and was admitted to the Central School of Speech and Drama in London. His first film role was as Benvolio in Franco Zeffirelli's film adaptation of Romeo and Juliet (1968). He then appeared in Roddy McDowall's Tam Lin (1970), Ken Russell's The Music Lovers (1970), Barney Platts-Mills's Private Road (1971) and François Truffaut's The Story of Adèle H. (1975). After spending several years out of work and living on social security payments, he became disenchanted and began writing screenplays. He was soon commissioned by David Puttnam to write the screenplay for Roland Joffé's The Killing Fields (1984). Robinson was nominated for an Academy Award and won a BAFTA for his work. In 1989, Robinson wrote again for Joffé on Fat Man and Little Boy. He returned to acting briefly in 1998, taking a role in the film Still Crazy.

He is perhaps best known as the creative force behind the loosely autobiographical film Withnail and I (1987) which he based on his time as a struggling out-of-work actor. The character 'Withnail' is reportedly based on his friend, Vivian MacKerrell, the character 'I' (Marwood), on himself. It is set in 1969, the same year he starred in Roddy McDowell's Tam Lin. Though unsuccessful at the box office, because of its success on video it has since been described as "one of Britain's biggest cult films". The film also launched the acting career of Richard E. Grant.

Robinson's next two outings as a director (How to Get Ahead in Advertising, teaming him again with Richard E. Grant, and Jennifer 8, a Hollywood thriller) were not as well received. Robinson became disillusioned with the restrictive film-making practices of Hollywood and stopped directing to concentrate solely on writing. He wrote the screenplays for the films Return to Paradise (1998) and In Dreams (1999), but both were altered drastically by their producers, leaving Robinson once again disappointed.

Robinson eventually returned to directing with an adaptation of Hunter S. Thompson's novel The Rum Diary, with the main role performed by Johnny Depp. With Aaron Eckhart and Richard Jenkins also on board, filming started on 25 March 2009 in Puerto Rico. It was released in 2011. In 2012, Robinson's comic novella Paranoia in the Launderette was substantially filled out and adapted for the screen as A Fantastic Fear of Everything starring Simon Pegg. Robinson has completed a screenplay for his novel The Peculiar Memories of Thomas Penman and a book on Jack the Ripper, titled They All Love Jack.

== Author ==
Robinson is also a successful author. His first published work was the semi-autobiographical novel The Peculiar Memories of Thomas Penman in 1998, based on his own childhood growing up in Broadstairs, Kent. In 2000, Smoking in Bed: Conversations with Bruce Robinson, edited by Alistair Owen, was published, made up of a selection of interviews given by Robinson. Meanwhile, since becoming a father, Robinson has also written two children's books, The Obvious Elephant (2000) and Harold and the Duck (2005), both illustrated by his wife. The former is also available as an audiobook edition (2003), read by Lorelei King and Michael Maloney. He spent about 15 years collecting and researching the materials on the mystery of Jack the Ripper, which later became his book They All Love Jack: Busting the Ripper (2015). Robinson identified songwriter Michael Maybrick as his prime suspect for the killings.

== Personal life ==
Robinson married artist Sophie Windham in 1984, and they live in England. They have a daughter, Lily, and a son, Willoughby.

Robinson claimed to have been the target of unwanted sexual advances by Franco Zeffirelli during the filming of Romeo and Juliet, in which Robinson played Benvolio. Robinson says that the lecherous character of Uncle Monty in the film Withnail and I was influenced by Zeffirelli.

== Filmography ==
=== Director/writer ===
Year	Title	Director	Writer	Notes
1984	The Killing Fields	No	Yes	
1987	Withnail and I	Yes	Yes	
1989	How to Get Ahead in Advertising	Yes	Yes	
1989	Fat Man and Little Boy	No	Yes	
1992	Jennifer 8	Yes	Yes	
1998	Return to Paradise	No	Yes	
1999	In Dreams	No	Yes	
2011	The Rum Diary	Yes	Yes	
2012	A Fantastic Fear of Everything	No	Novella	Based on Paranoia in the Launderette (1998)

=== Actor ===
- Romeo and Juliet (1968) as Benvolio
- Sleep Is Lovely (1968) as Colin
- Baby Love (1969) as Man in Nightclub (uncredited)
- Tam Lin (1970) as Alan
- The Music Lovers (1971) as Alexei Sofronov
- Private Road (1971) as Peter Morrissey
- The Story of Adèle H. (1975) as Lt Albert Pinson
- Los viajes escolares (1976) as Óscar
- The Brute (1977) as Mark
- Kleinhoff Hotel (1977) as Karl Axel
- Harry's War (1981) as IRS Agent #2
- How to Get Ahead in Advertising (1989) as The Boil (voice, uncredited)
- Still Crazy (1998) as Brian Lovell

== Bibliography ==
=== Books ===
- Paranoia in the Launderette (1998)
- The Peculiar Memories of Thomas Penman (1998)
- The Obvious Elephant (2000)
- Smoking in Bed: Conversations With Bruce Robinson (edited by Alastair Owen) (2001)
- Harold and the Duck (2005)
- They All Love Jack: Busting the Ripper (2015)

=== Plays ===
- Withnail and I (2024)
