= Playerist Poetry Magazine =

Playerist Poetry Magazine (ISSN 2048-2515) was an annual journal of poetics and graphic arts based in London (UK). Playerist was founded in 2011 by writer, composer and publisher Martin Slidel, and ran until 2018. Its patrons were Jillian Miller FRSA and poet and actor Amy Neilson Smith. "Billed as a 'small constellation of words and images,' this poetry zine is slight and unassuming."

== Ethos ==
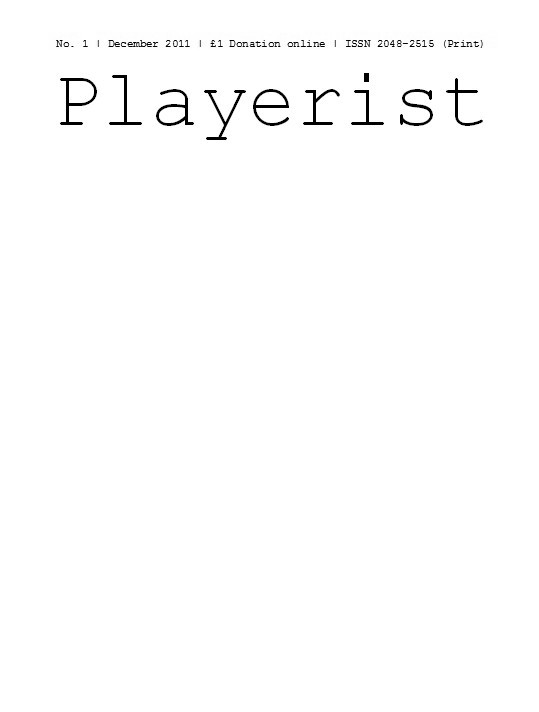
Front cover of the first edition of Playerist Poetry Magazine (2011, UK)

Playerist featured "a range of emergent and established writers and artists" from London, the UK, and worldwide, as a platform for new work. "Names" included photographer Ellen Nolan, Ivor Novello Award winner Catherine Howe, singer Christine Collister, actor Amy McAllister and international Jazz vocalist Barb Jungr. For its second edition, actor Margaret Nolan (who further contributed artwork and verse to the project) was interviewed about her experience as model for Robert Brownjohn's Goldfinger film title sequence. The interview is often quoted in articles about Nolan, and it also concludes the New York Times obituary.

Playerist was a black and white A5 pamphlet on 100g satin paper with an annual run of 200 copies. It is on catalogue at The Saison Poetry Library, South Bank Centre (London, UK), listed as a poetry magazine. Prints were distributed at a range of city venues. As a performance collective, Playerist staged several arts and music events, usually at Covent Garden's Poetry Society, many of which were filmed for the Rockyoumentally YouTube Channel (Director: Alexander McLean). Its launch event in 2011 was at The Seven Dials Club, also in Covent Garden (London). Playerist has a five-star rating on WorldCat. It followed set themes from its inception in 2011 through to its final edition in 2018. Brighton-based (East Sussex, UK) spoken word performer Yassin Zelestine contributed commissioned works for each issue.

The 2014 edition on the theme of "Mistakes" ironically contained a typo resulting in its first run being remaindered, and followed by an amended print. Playerist was cited by Xerography Debt as "a smorgasbord of poetry and prose with a smattering of black and white artwork."

== Themes ==
Year	Theme	Cover	Contributors
2011	"Loss"	No cover image	Karen Ay; Pedro Consorte; Caroline Davies; Carlo Keshishian; Piroska Markus; Ellen Nolan; Benjamin Soehnel; Yassin Zelestine
2012	"Artifice"	Cover image by Margaret Nolan	Eleanor Leonne Bennett; Rachel Bennett; Chris Bird; Abdul Dube; Carole Hamilton; Michael Lee Johnson; Megan Kelley; David R Morgan; Margaret Nolan; Thomas Schlieben; Grant Tarbard; Yassin Zelestine
2013	"Comedy"	Cover image by graffiti artist Hutch	Howard Colyer; Sean Duffield; Mario Herran; Megan Kelley; Tanja Mariadoss; Piroska Markus; Margaret Nolan; Imogen Miller Porter; Chris Sav; Thomas Schlieben; Amy Neilson Smith; Yassin Zelestine
2014	"Mistakes"	No cover image	Otaru Daudu; Caroline Herran; Catherine Howe; Piroska Markus; Amy McAllister; Peter Russell; Chris Sav; Chris Silver; Amy Neilson Smith; Grant Tarbard; Yassin Zelestine
2015	"Food"	Cover image by graphic artist Mario Herran	Rachel Bennett; Ernie Burns; Andrei Cornea; Sean Duffield; Sophie Fenella; Gabriel Kemlo; Bethany Pope; Louise Rundle; Chris Sav; Chris Silver; Amy Neilson Smith; Grant Tarbard; Yassin Zelestine
2016	"Love"	No cover image	Marc Carver; Andrei Cornea; Stephen Philip Druce; Cathy Flower; Ciarán Hodgers; Megan Kelley; Bob Kesh; Piroska Markus; Chris Silver; Amy Neilson Smith; Grant Tarbard; Yassin Zelestine
2017	"Music"	No cover image (text art by Martin Slidel)	Gregory Arena; Andrei Cornea; Mark Coverdale; Clive Donovan; Abdul Dube; Cathy Flower; Janet Hatherley; Catherine Howe; Barb Jungr; Megan Kelley; Margaret Nolan; Chris Silver; Angus Strachan; Yassin Zelestine
2018	"Deep"	No cover image	Christine Collister; Natalie Crick; Cathy Flower; Caroline Herran; Rob Hughes; Rosamund Irwin; Raie; Skopta; Engeline Tan; Grant Tarbard; Yassin Zelestine

== Live events and short films ==
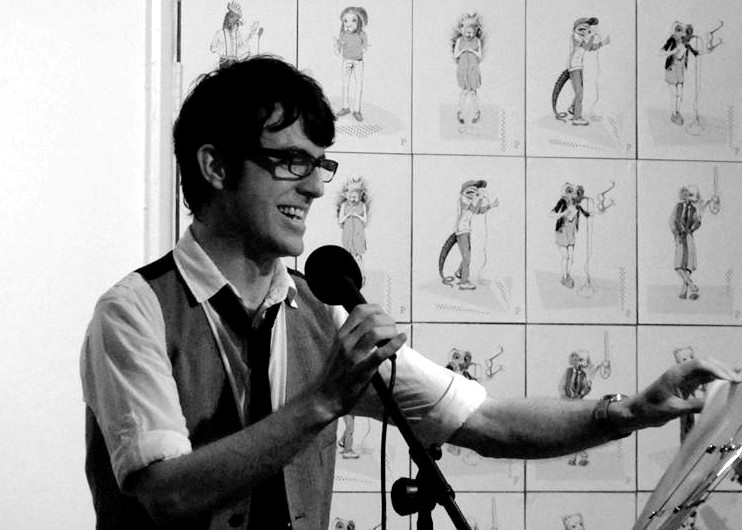
Martin Slidel hosting The Playerist Comedy Night at The Poetry Society, London (UK). Art installation by Mario Herran.

Alexander Mclean filmed and produced a series of promotional videos of various Playerist events held at The Poetry Society's Poetry Café in Covent Garden, London (UK). An exception was "The Playerist Gathering", staged at a Victorian townhouse in North London. Two events featured art installations curated by Slidel who formerly curated a group show at Brighton's Start Gallery. The installations (for separate dates) constituted printed line drawings by graphic artists Mario Herran and Chetan Prajapati. Actor Margaret Nolan made an unscheduled appearance at "The Playerist Comedy Night" in 2013 (as reviewed by What’s On London). The next Comedy Night the following year showcased actors and writers Amy McAllister and Denis Quilligan, with music by classical guitarist Tom Gamble. Another event the same year ("Playerist Poets Live", 2014) featured actor Jean Apps alongside spoken and musical performances by Tara Newton-Wordsworth.

Year	Title	Production	Director
2014	Playerist Comedy Night at Poetry Café	Rockyoumentally	Alexander Mclean
2014	The Playerist Gathering	Rockyoumentally	Alexander Mclean
2015	Martin Slidel – Playerist Poets Live at Poetry Café	Rockyoumentally	Alexander Mclean
2015	Playerist Poetry Live At Poetry Café London	Rockyoumentally	Alexander Mclean
