= Lilika =

1970 film

- Directed by: Branko Pleša
- Written by: Dragoslav Mihailović; Branko Pleša
- Starring: Dragana Kalaba
- Cinematography: Aleksandar Petković
- Release date: 11 February 1970
- Running time: 80 minutes
- Country: Yugoslavia
- Language: Serbo-Croatian

Lilika (Serbian: Лилика) is a 1970 Yugoslav drama film directed by Branko Pleša. The film won the Golden Leopard at the Locarno International Film Festival.

== Cast ==
- Dragana Kalaba as Milica Sandić - Lilika
- Branko Pleša as Counsellor
- Ljerka Draženović as Aunt
- Nada Kasapić
- Tamara Miletić as Mother
- Gizela Vuković
- Vesna Krajina
- Danilo Stojković as Stepfather
- Ljiljana Kontić as Đurđica
- Vladimir Pevec as Peca
- Sanja Jeremić
- Nada Šarac
