= Fabio Garriba =

Italian stage, film, and television actor

- Born: 13 November 1944; Soave, Italy
- Died: 9 August 2016 (aged 71); Verona, Italy
- Occupation: Actor

Fabio Garriba (13 November 1944 – 9 August 2016) was an Italian stage, film and television actor.

== Life and career ==
Born in Soave, Garriba started his career on stage, and in 1969 he made his film debut in Dziga Vertov Group's Wind from the East. He later worked with prominent directors such as Roberto Rossellini, Bernardo Bertolucci, Ettore Scola, Marco Bellocchio and Luigi Magni. He also had leading roles in films directed by his twin brother Mario, notably the Golden Leopard winner On the Point of Death.

Garriba also worked as assistant director for Bernardo Bertolucci, Pier Paolo Pasolini, Marco Ferreri and Carmelo Bene. His only work as director, the short film I parenti tutti, was screened at the 68th Venice International Film Festival alongside his brother's works in the retrospective "Orizzonti 1960-1978". Garriba also published several collections of poetries.

== Filmography ==
Year	Title	Role	Notes
1970	Wind from the East		
1971	Anche per Django le carogne hanno un prezzo		
1971	Er più: storia d'amore e di coltello		
1971	On the Point of Death		
1972	Il sorriso della iena		
1972	Storia di confine		
1972	The Scientific Cardplayer		
1972	Slap the Monster on Page One	Roveda	
1972	Agostino d'Ippona	Marcellino	TV movie
1972	La cosa buffa	Benito	
1972	I bandoleros della dodicesima ora		
1972	I racconti di Canterbury N. 2		
1973	Canterbury n. 2: Nuove Storie d'amore del '300		
1973	Those Dirty Dogs	Mexican Bandit	
1973	Giorni d'amore sul filo di una lama		
1974	La via dei babbuini	Orazio	
1975	Quant'è bella la Bernarda, tutta nera, tutta calda	Friar	(segment "Frate Fontanarosa")
1976	1900	Peasant at Attila's execution	
1979	Ammazzare il tempo		
1980	La terrazza	Giorgio Campi, registe	
1985	Piccoli fuochi		(final film role)
