= Slavica (film) =

- Starring: Dubravko Dujšin; Milica-Carka Jovanović; Irena Kolesar
- Release date: 29 April 1947
- Running time: 1h 40min
- Country: Yugoslavia
- Language: Serbo-Croatian

Slavica is a 1947 Yugoslav drama film directed by Vjekoslav Afrić.

== Cast ==
- Dubravko Dujšin - Sime
- Milica-Carka Jovanović - Luce
- Irena Kolesar - Slavica
