= Bronco Bullfrog =

1969 British film by Barney Platts-Mills

- Directed by: Barney Platts-Mills
- Written by: Barney Platts-Mills
- Produced by: Andrew St. John; Michael Syson
- Starring: Del Walker; Ann Gooding; Sam Shepherd; Roy Haywood
- Cinematography: Adam Barker-Mill
- Edited by: Jonathan Gili
- Music by: Tony Connor; Keith Gemmell; Trevor Williams; Howard Werth
- Production company: Maya Films
- Distributed by: Maya Films (Original 1970 UK release); New Yorker Films (1972 US release); British Film Institute (2010 UK blu-ray DVD release); Seventy-Seven (2022 North American re-release)
- Release date: 1969 (UK)
- Running time: 86 minutes
- Country: United Kingdom
- Language: English
- Budget: £18,000
- Box office: $10,434

Bronco Bullfrog (also known as Around Angel Lane and Ghost Squad TV 3) is a 1969 British kitchen sink teen drama film directed by Barney Platts-Mills and starring Del Walker, Ann Gooding and Sam Shepherd. Shot in black-and-white, it was Platts-Mills' first full-length feature film.

== Plot ==
The film follows the fortunes of 17-year-old Del, and his group of friends. As the film opens, four youths, Del, Roy, Chris and Geoff, are seen breaking into a cafe in Stratford, East London, but they only get away with about ninepence and some cake, and it is clear that they are hardly master criminals. Back at their hut on waste ground they mention Jo, known as 'Bronco Bullfrog' (for reasons which are never explained), who has just got out of Borstal.

Once Del and Roy meet Jo in a cafe, they link up with him to carry out a bigger robbery. Meanwhile, Del meets Irene, a friend of a cousin of Chris's and they start a relationship despite the disapproval of Irene's mother and Del's father. The remainder of the film follows Del and Irene as they attempt to escape their dead-end lives.

== Cast ==
- Del Walker as Del Quant
- Ann Gooding as Irene Richardson
- Sam Shepherd as Jo Saville alias Bronco Bullfrog
- Roy Haywood as Roy
- Freda Shepherd as Mrs. Richardson
- Dick Philpott as Del's father
- Chris Shepherd as Chris
- Stuart Stones as Sergeant Johnson
- Geoffrey Wincott as Geoff (as Geoff Wincott)
- J. Hughes Sr. as Del's uncle
- Mick Hart as Grimes
- Ken Field as Dave
- Marguerite Hughes as Marge
- E.E. Blundell as landlady
- J. Hughes Jr. as Parker

== Production ==
=== Filming ===
The film was shot in East London over a period of six weeks on 35mm. It was largely improvised and used a cast of non-professional actors.

=== Post-production ===
The film was turned down by Bryan Forbes at EMI Films.

== Release ==
=== Princess Anne Story ===
A 2010 Guardian article noted a story about Princess Anne connected with the film's original release. In November 1970, a group of 200 members of the Beaumont Youth Club in Leyton jeered Princess Anne, with some throwing tomatoes, as she was going to see the London premiere of Three Sisters instead of Bronco Bullfrog. A week later, Princess Anne did go to see the latter at the Mile End ABC. Sam Shepherd claims that he was arrested by police for attempting to kiss her hand. He would later write to her to apologise.

=== Obscurity ===
The film became obscure after its cinema run, and was only shown twice on television between 1969 and 2010.

In the mid-1980s, the master negative was disposed of in a rubbish skip but was retrieved by an employee of a film laboratory who placed it in an archive.

=== Re-releases ===
In 2022 the film was released in independent cinemas across the United States by the New York-based film label seventy-seven.

A new HD version of the film opened the ninth East End Film Festival on 22 April 2010, prior to its re-release in summer 2010.

=== Critical reception ===
The Monthly Film Bulletin wrote: "Ingredients that seem perilously unpromising – aimless, episodic narrative, the inarticulacy of the characters, and a cast picked almost literally 'off the street' (though several had worked on Platt's-Mills' previous, and aptly titled, film Everybody's an Actor) – compel attention by an underplayed and miraculously non-committal realism; both less sentimental than Kes [1969] and less insistently sociological than, say, We Are the Lambeth Boys [1959]. ... According to Platts-Mills, most of the scenes were indeed improvised – if only because the cast hadn't actually read the script – and the acting achieves in consequence an air of real spontaneity, even discovery, in which restless glances and glum silences become as illuminating as the 'dialogue' itself. Through these, the actors' personalities emerge strongly.

The Radio Times Guide to Films gave the film 3/5 stars, writing: "This product of the British social realist school was much admired in its day with director Barney Platts-Mills being favourably compared to Ken Loach. ... Although rough around the edges and containing some weak supporting performances, the depiction of the restless, day-to-day existence of ordinary youngsters is authentic."

Ali Carterall and Simon Wells wrote in Your Face Here: British Cult Movies Since the Sixties: "Bronco Bullfrog is as close to pure Mod poetry as you're going to get and it's a crying shame that this masterpiece has only been seen by a handful of those in the know."

=== Home media ===
The film was released in the BFI Flipside series dual format edition (DVD and Blu-ray), with other films including Seven Green Bottles (1975, director Eric Marquis), and Platts-Mills' film Everybody's an actor, Shakespeare said (1968) as extras.

When submitted for home release, the film was originally given a 12 certificate in 2004 but this was changed to a 15 certificate in 2010. The change is believed to come from the appearance of the taboo word cunt in graffiti in a very brief clip that the censors could have missed originally.

A new Blu-ray edition of Bronco Bullfrog is scheduled for release by the label Seventy-Seven on 27 January 2026.

=== Trivia ===
During a series 14 episode of Call the Midwife, several of the show's main characters attend the Mile End ABC premiere of the film attended by Princess Anne.
