= Raymundo Gleyzer =

Argentinian film maker

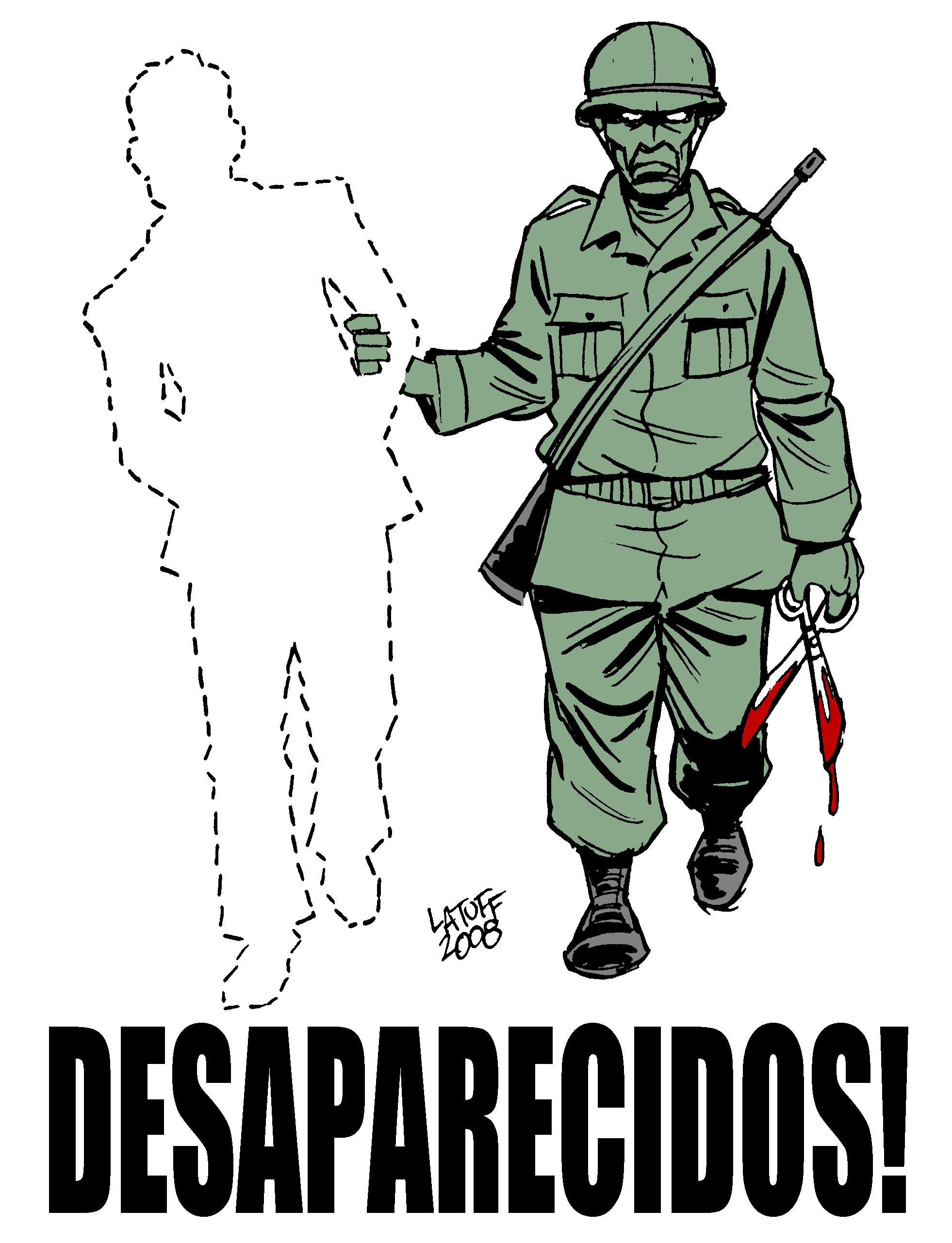
Carlos Latuff cartoon on the disappeared people of Latin America.

Raymundo Gleyzer (September 25, 1941 - missing since May 27, 1976) was an Argentine screenwriter and filmmaker. He specialized in documentaries and politically charged fiction films. Gleyzer was part of the Marxist political party and guerrilla PRT- ERP. In 1976 he was kidnapped, likely murdered and disappeared as part of the dictatorship's campaign of State-sponsored terrorism.

== Biography ==
Born into an Argentine Jewish family in Buenos Aires, Gleyzer became interested in politics and film early on in his life. From the start of his career all of his films were focused on the fight against social injustice and for political revolution in Latin America's countries.

He made his first film in the wilds of northeastern Brazil, where he barely escaped death at the hands of the military dictatorship ruling there. In the early 1970s he made a film in Mexico about the so-called "institutionalized revolution" of the ruling party, the Institutional Revolutionary Party. The film was banned in Argentina at first, but was well-received in Mexico by university students. In 1973 he co-founded the Cine de la Base group, which organized demonstrations and discussions with workers (i.e., outside the film industry).

His last major film, Los traidores (The Traitors, 1973), presents a strong critique of the right-wing faction which prevailed in the Peronist political movement at the time and which also played a pivotal role in Juan Domingo Peron's third and last presidential term, in 1973. The film depicts how several union leaders had secretly and slowly aligned themselves —many years before Perón's comeback and inauguration for his third presidency— with the economical establishment, the military and United States's interests with the only goal of maintaining their personal power and enrich themselves.

On May 27, 1976, Gleyzer was abducted and tortured by a death squad of the Argentina's last military dictatorship that had come to power two months earlier, and never seen again. He is thus one of thousands of desaparecidos (disappeared) of the dictatorship, most of which were secretly murdered. Brazilian cartoonist Carlos Latuff created a cartoon dedicated to Gleyzer and the violently "disappeared" people of Latin America.

== Films ==
- 1964: The Land Burns (La tierra quema), short documentary
- 1964: El Cyclo, short
- 1965: Ceramiqueros de tras la sierra
- 1966: It Happened in Hualfin (Occurido en hualfin), documentary
- 1966: Our Malvinas Islands (Nuestras islas Malvinas), short documentary
- 1969: Elinda of the Valley (Elinda del Valle), short documentary
- 1971: Swift 1971, documentary
- 1971: Mexico: The Frozen Revolution (México, la revolución congelada), documentary
- 1972: Ni olvido ni perdón: 1972, la masacre de Trelew, short documentary
- 1973: The Traitors (Los traidores), drama
- 1975: Me matan si no trabajo y si trabajo me matan: La huelga obrera en la fábrica INSUD, documentary
