= BFI Flipside =

Series of DVD and Blu-ray films

BFI Flipside is a series of Dual Format Editions (DVD and Blu-ray released together) which was launched in May 2009 and is published by the British Film Institute's Video label. The series so far features a total of 65 feature and short films, as well as 10 archive interviews with the likes of Spike Milligan, Peter Cook and Richard Lester. The first release in the series was The Bed Sitting Room.

The BFI Flipside charts "the untold history of British film", and includes performances by such celebrated actors as John Hurt, Jane Asher, Ian McNeice, Richard O'Brien, Tom Bell, Peter Cook, Barry Evans, Denholm Elliott and Judy Geeson in films directed by the likes of Clive Donner, Richard Lester, Barney Platts-Mills, John Irvin, Stuart Cooper, Guy Hamilton, Peter Watkins and James Hill. Each BFI Flipside edition includes a feature film presentation that is complemented by additional film content (sometimes a second feature film by the same director, or a selection of short films which are related to the main feature by subject, era, actor or director). Each release is packaged in distinctive artwork which carries the volume number on the spine and with a comprehensive booklet containing informative essays, full cast and credit information, original film reviews and reproductions of original promotional material.

The Flipside is dedicated to releasing British film titles which have never been available on any home video format before (though some exceptions have been noted by the label's founder and programmer) and all films are newly mastered to High Definition from the best available film materials from the BFI National Archive or from the collections of filmmakers. Each title was originally released on both DVD and Blu-ray, but since The Pleasure Girls in a dual format release.

A budget-priced DVD sampler entitled Kim Newman's Guide to The Flipside of British Cinema (2010), spine number "000", features a documentary in which the UK's leading cult film expert introduced and contextualized the first nine releases in the series and also included three complete short films as extras - John Irvin's Carousella (1966), Gerry O'Hara's The Spy's Wife (1972) and a short travelogue Tomorrow Night in London (1969, exclusive to the release).
