= They Have Changed Their Face =

1971 film

- Directed by: Corrado Farina
- Screenplay by: Giulio Berruta; Corrado Farina
- Story by: Corrado Farina
- Starring: Adolfo Celi; Geraldine Hooper; Giuliano Esperati
- Cinematography: Aiace Parolin
- Edited by: Giulio Berruti
- Music by: Amedeo Tommasi
- Production company: Filmsettanta S.r.l.
- Distributed by: Garligiano
- Release date: 2 July 1971 (Italy)
- Running time: 95 minutes
- Country: Italy

They Have Changed Their Face (Italian: ...Hanno cambiato faccia) is a 1971 Italian horror film directed by Corrado Farina and starring Adolfo Celi. The film won the Golden Leopard award for the Best First Feature at the Locarno International Film Festival in 1971.

== Plot ==
The director of a famous car corporation invites one of his employees to his country villa to give him some good news. He has just been promoted. However, the old man is not what he seems, and promotion has a price.

== Production ==
The screenplay of They Have Changed Their Face was written by Giulio Berruta and director Corrado Farina. They were influenced by German philosopher Herbert Marcuse, specifically his book One-Dimensional Man (1964), a critique of capitalism and communist Russia which provided the film with its thesis that consumerism is a form of social control. According to Farina, the film was very low budget, costing about 50 million Italian lire.

The film was shot in Turin and Incir-DePaolis Studios in Rome between December 1970 and January 1971.

== Release ==
They Have Changed Their Face was distributed by Garligiano in Italy on 2 July 1971. The film grossed a total of 28.01 million Italian lire on its domestic release. The film was released on DVD in the United States in 2014 as They've Changed Their Faces.

== Reception ==
They Have Changed Their Face won the Golden Leopard award for the Best First Feature at the Locarno International Film Festival in 1971.

In his overview of Italian gothic films of the 1970s, film critic and historian Roberto Curti described the film "stagnates and sags halfway through" and that some of the social and political commentary in the film became a bit "naive and predictable" Farina spoke about the film later, declaring that "had it been made with a bigger budget and means, it might have been a cute little thing ... it is sad to see it today, as it is basically a conceptual movie."
