= On the Point of Death =

1971 film

- Directed by: Mario Garriba
- Written by: Mario Garriba
- Starring: Fabio Garriba
- Cinematography: Renato Berta
- Release date: 1971
- Running time: 60 minutes
- Country: Italy
- Language: Italian

On the Point of Death (Italian: In punto di morte) is a 1971 Italian drama film directed by Mario Garriba. The film won the Golden Leopard at the Locarno International Film Festival.

== Cast ==
- Fabio Garriba
- Jobst Grapow
- Lidija Juracik
- Maria Marchi
- Gabriella Minciotti
