= Corrado Farina =

Italian film director, screenwriter and novelist

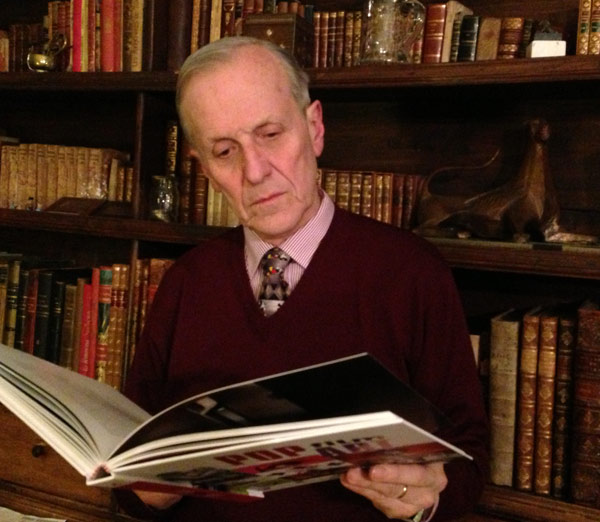
- Born: 18 March 1939; Turin, Italy
- Died: 11 July 2016 (aged 77); Rome, Italy
- Occupations: Film director, screenwriter, novelist

Corrado Farina (18 March 1939 – 11 July 2016) was an Italian film director, screenwriter and novelist. He directed two feature films in the 1970s, many documentaries and commercials, and he published nine novels and an autobiography.

== Filmography ==
Title	Year	Credited as			Notes	Ref(s)
Title	Year	Director	Screenwriter	Screen storywriter	Notes	Ref(s)
They Have Changed Their Face	1971	Yes	Yes	Yes		
Baba Yaga	1973	Yes	Yes			

== Novels ==
- (in Italian) Un posto al buio, Biblioteca del Vascello, 1994. (ISBN 88-86312-46-6)
- (in Italian) Giallo antico, Fògola, 1999. (ISBN 88-7406-004-1)
- (in Italian) Storia di sesso e di fumetto, Mare nero, 2001. (ISBN 88-87495-36-X)
- (in Italian) Dissolvenza incrociata, Fògola, 2002. (ISBN 88-7406-004-1)
- (in Italian) Il calzolaio, Marco Valerio, 2004. (ISBN 88-7547-005-7)
- (in Italian) Il cielo sopra Torino, Fògola, 2006. (ISBN 88-7406-099-8)
- (in Italian) L'invasione degli ultragay - una storia politicamente scorretta, Zero91, 2008. (ISBN 88-95381-06-8)
- (in Italian) La figlia dell'istante, Fògola, 2010. (ISBN 9788874060368)
- (in Italian) Vita segreta di Emilio Salgari, Daniela Piazza, 2015. (ISBN 9788878892835)
