= Mexico: The Frozen Revolution =

- Spanish: México, la revolución congelada
- Directed by: Raymundo Gleyzer
- Cinematography: Humberto Rios
- Edited by: Raymundo Gleyzer
- Release date: 1971
- Running time: 65 minute
- Country: Argentina
- Language: Spanish

Mexico: The Frozen Revolution (Spanish: México, la revolución congelada) is a 1971 Argentine documentary film, which details the history and progress of the Mexican Revolution (1911-1917). It also focuses on the life of the peasants and the evolution of land reform. Its maker, Raymundo Gleyzer, was kidnapped by the dictatorship of Argentina in 1976 and is one of the 30,000 people who have disappeared in Argentine concentration camps.

The film was first screened at the Directors' Fortnight of the 1971 Cannes Film Festival.
