= Barney Platts-Mills =

British film director (1944–2021)

- Born: 15 October 1944; Colchester, England, U.K.
- Died: 5 October 2021 (aged 76)
- Occupation: Film director

Barney Platts-Mills (15 October 1944 – 5 October 2021) was a British film director, best known for his award-winning films, Bronco Bullfrog and Private Road.

== Biography ==
Platts-Mills was born in 1944 in Colchester, England, a son of barrister John Platts-Mills (who was briefly a Labour MP), and was educated at University College School, London, and at Bryanston School, Blandford, Dorset.

He entered the film industry in 1960, as 3rd assistant editor at Shepperton Studios and worked on Stanley Kubrick's Spartacus, Lewis Gilbert's The Greengage Summer and John Schlesinger's A Kind of Loving among other films, for editors including Peter R. Hunt and Reggie Beck. Platts-Mills worked as editor for Anglia TV's Survival and Granada TV's World in Action.

In 1966, he established Maya Films with James Scott, Adam Barker-Mill and Andrew St. John. Platts-Mills produced and edited Love's Presentation, a 30-minute documentary on the work of David Hockney, directed by James Scott, and also produced and directed St Christopher, a 45-minute documentary on children in the care of St Christopher's School, Bristol, and the Camphill Village Trust, Botton, Yorkshire. He wrote, produced and directed The War, a cinema short, starring Colin Welland and Eric Burdon (15 minutes, B&W 35 mm Panavision). He wrote and directed Everybody's an Actor, Shakespeare Said, a documentary on the work of Joan Littlewood, with young people in the East End of London (35 minutes, 16 mm Eastmancolor).

In 1969, he wrote and directed Bronco Bullfrog with young people from the East End (83 minutes, 35 mm B&W) Selectione a l'Unanimite pour Semain de la Critique, Festival de Cannes. The film won a Screenwriters' Guild award for Best Original Screenplay.

In 1971, he wrote and directed Private Road (86 minutes, 35 mm Eastmancolor), starring Bruce Robinson, Susan Penhaligon and Michael Feast. It was awarded the Golden Leopard at the Locarno Festival for Best Film.

In 1972, Platts-Mills was made a Governor and Honorary Life Member of the British Film Institute and Director of the Prodigal Trust, Inner London School's video project. He took piano lessons with Trevor Fisher.

Platts-Mills' screenplay Double Trouble was published as a novel by Duckworth in 1976. The following year, he wrote screenplays for The Scotsman and Hero. After two years' preparation he directed Hero (82 minutes, 16 mm Eastmancolor) for Film Four in ancient Gaelic with actors drawn from a Glasgow youth gang. Hero was an official entry at the Venice Film Festival.

In 1983, Platts-Mills wrote the screenplay for Ebb Tide by Robert Louis Stevenson, to be filmed for Film Four in Sri Lanka starring Harry Dean Stanton and Christopher Lee. The project abandoned when war broke out in that country. Between 1984 and 1988, he was resident in Sussex with his two young children, Roland and Ruby.

In 1989, Platts-Mills wrote and directed Blasphemy for Channel Four's Dispatches.

In 1990, he worked in The Special Unit at HMP Barlinnie, Glasgow, on various projects, including a musical to be staged by prisoners in the jail and the first-ever performance by a circus (Archaos) in a British jail. He edited John Steele's The Bird That Never Flew, an autobiography of a prison trouble-maker published by Sinclair-Stevenson in 1992.

Platts-Mills was advisor to the development of Wornington Green Residents' Association Video Project for disadvantaged youth in 1993, and in 1994 he set up and supervised the first year of the North Kensington Video Drama Project (NKVDP), including work for the Metropolitan Police Scam scheme and the Youth Enterprise Scheme.

In 1995, together with students from the NKVDP he established Massive Videos at North Kensington Community Centre and worked on the development of Courttia Newland's The Scholar. Between 1996 and 1999, Massive Videos made many short films by and about disadvantaged young people and founded the Film and Video Festival. In Liverpool they established the Workhaus project in a five-storey building in the city centre and the North X Northwest Film Festival.

In 1999, Platts-Mills met Tunde Olayinka and acted as adviser to The Alpha Male, Olayinka's first film.

Platts-Mills went to Morocco in 2000 and lived for a year on a farm near Larache, writing the screenplay for Lovesways.

He built a house in Mejlaou near Assilah in 2004 and wrote the screenplay for Zohra: A Moroccan Fairytale.

Bronco Bullfrog and Private Road were re-released in 2010 by the BFI and the National Film Theater. Platts-Mills' films were screened in retrospectives at the Edinburgh Film Festival, Gijion Film Festival, BAFICI, Copenhagen Film Festival and the opening night Premiere at the East End Film Festival.

Platts-Mills joined the film production company Miraj Films in 2010 as a producer and completed the production of Zohra: A Moroccan Fairytale, his love poem to Morocco and his comeback after 30 years, which had its world premiere at the 40th International Rotterdam Film Festival.

Platts-Mills is credited with founding the independent production company, Peabody Productions.

He died on 5 October 2021, at the age of 76.
