= Stop Messing About =

British radio show

Stop Messing About is a BBC radio series broadcast in 1969 and 1970. Forced by circumstance into being a follow-up to Round the Horne, it retained a number of key talents from the previous show, with Kenneth Williams as the new show's main star.

It was rewritten for the stage in 2009.

== Radio series ==
The sudden death of Round the Horne star Kenneth Horne at the end of series four prompted a rewrite of the material intended for series five which then found its way into Stop Messing About alongside new sketches; Round the Horne writers Johnnie Mortimer and Brian Cooke are therefore credited with series one of Stop Messing About, while series two, which was entirely original, was written by Myles Rudge, David Cumming and Derek Collyer.

Stop Messing About was recast as a vehicle for Kenneth Williams, who on the day of the first transmission wrote in his diary that "It was mediocre and played to a half empty house... Joan said 'Let's face it dear, our careers are in the ash can...'" Of a later edition, however, he wrote that "It went like a bomb. I was very pleased with the marvellous reception... and it's a triumph in the face of the terrible adversity of KH's death."

The title was a catchphrase coined for Williams by Galton and Simpson back in the days of Hancock's Half Hour. Hugh Paddick and announcer Douglas Smith were retained from Round the Horne, starring alongside Joan Sims, who had already signed on for the fifth series of Round the Horne in place of Betty Marsden and therefore made a smooth transition to Stop Messing About.

The first episode was recorded at the BBC's Paris Theatre in Lower Regent Street (former home of Round the Horne) on Monday 17 March 1969, and the final show was transmitted on 27 August 1970. Of the show's cancellation, Williams noted in his diary (1 September 1970) that "there'd been complaints about how dirty the script was etc", and described it as "a sad end to about 12 years of radio comedy."

Barry Took, co-writer of Round the Horne, pointed out that the show was proof of the fact that Williams, though second to none as a grotesque supporting actor of undoubted comic genius, did not have the requisite weight to anchor a show in the way Horne had done so effortlessly: "It was written by a sort of miscellaneous gang of writers who didn't really understand what they were doing. It didn't work. He [Williams] wasn't a leading man, it has to be said. I mean, he was a wonderful support. He was Montgomery to Kenneth Horne's Alexander."

During the summer of 2006 the digital radio station BBC 7 gave Stop Messing About a regular slot, as a break from Round the Horne. It was repeated during spring 2008 and again, this time on Radio 4 extra, in 2014, 2017 and 2023-24.

=== Performers ===
- Douglas Smith was a BBC announcer who slowly began working his way up to speaking parts in Round the Horne, and then took on several parts in Stop Messing About.
- Hugh Paddick, who also appeared in Round the Horne and Beyond Our Ken, was a foil to Kenneth Williams, as previously heard in the Julian and Sandy routines in Round the Horne.
- Joan Sims is best known for her numerous performances in the Carry On films. She previously appeared in A Tribute To Greatness, also with Kenneth Williams.
- Kenneth Williams interrupted Round the Horne and Stop Messing About with often unscripted interjections. The BBC would make one further attempt to use him in comedy, teaming him with Ted Ray (giving Ray the Kenneth Horne role) in the radio sketch comedy series The Betty Witherspoon Show.
- Music was provided by the Max Harris Group.

=== Writers ===
- Johnnie Mortimer
- Brian Cooke

Both Mortimer and Cooke had been latter-day contributors to Round the Horne in its final season. (Cooke was also the writer, over 30 years later, of the hit stage show Round the Horne ... Revisited).

- Myles Rudge

The producer was John Simmonds.

=== Regular features ===
- Crack-a-Jackanory with Mother Time was a parody of the BBC children's tv programme Jackanory. Joan Sims would read a story, which slowly developed more adult topics.

== Stage production ==
Forty years after the original broadcasts, Stop Messing About was rewritten for the stage, making an initial appearance at the Rose Theatre, Kingston in January 2009. The production was restaged in the West End at the Leicester Square Theatre in April, running for six weeks.

The stage show, penned by Brian Cooke and directed by Michael Kingsbury, was based on selected material from the original radio show alongside a majority of material written by Mortimer and Cooke for other shows. It starred Robin Sebastian as Kenneth Williams, Nigel Harrison as Hugh Paddick, Charles Armstrong as Douglas Smith and Emma Atkins as Joan Sims.

The show came from the same team that had previously mounted the hugely successful Round the Horne ... Revisited, using three of the same actors and even the same theatre. But it was welcomed by critics with less enthusiasm.

In the Independent, Michael Coveney headed his review "Carry-on that's short on laughs" and wrote: "'Infamy, infamy... they've all got it in for me!' It's typical of this so-called 'Kenneth Williams Extravaganza' ... that the funniest line actually comes from a Carry On movie." Kevin Quarmby of the British Theatre Guide called it "an evening of loud whistles and bangs, cringingly dated, sexist and, ultimately, sadly pseudo-homocentric banter." And in the Daily Telegraph - under the title 'Williams Misses His Horne' - Charles Spencer concluded that "Too many of the sketches here simply aren’t funny enough."
