= Kenneth Horne =

English comedian and businessman (1907–1969)

Kenneth Horne

Charles Kenneth Horne (27 February 1907 – 14 February 1969) was an English comedian and businessman. He is perhaps best remembered for his work on three BBC Radio series: Much-Binding-in-the-Marsh (1944–1954), Beyond Our Ken (1958–1964) and Round the Horne (1965–1968).

The son of a clergyman who was also a politician, Horne had a burgeoning business career with Triplex Safety Glass, which was interrupted by service with the Royal Air Force during the Second World War. While serving in a barrage balloon unit, he was asked to broadcast as a quizmaster on the BBC radio show Ack-Ack, Beer-Beer. The experience brought him into contact with the more established entertainer Richard Murdoch, and the two wrote and starred in the comedy series Much-Binding-in-the-Marsh. After demobilisation Horne returned to his business career, and kept his broadcasting as a sideline. His career in industry flourished, and he later became the chairman and managing director of toy manufacturers Chad Valley.

In 1958 Horne suffered a stroke and gave up his business dealings to concentrate on his entertainment work. He was the anchor figure in Beyond Our Ken, which also featured Kenneth Williams, Hugh Paddick, Betty Marsden and Bill Pertwee. When the programme came to an end in 1964, the same cast recorded four series of the comedy Round the Horne.

Before the planned fifth series of Round the Horne began recording, Horne died of a heart attack while hosting the annual Guild of Television Producers' and Directors' Awards; Round the Horne could not continue without him and was withdrawn. The series has been regularly re-broadcast since his death. A 2002 BBC radio survey to find listeners' favourite British comedian placed Horne third, behind Tony Hancock and Spike Milligan.

== Biography ==
=== Early life ===
Horne's father, nonconformist minister and Liberal MP Silvester Horne

Kenneth Horne was born Charles Kenneth Horne on 27 February 1907 at Ampthill Square, London. He was the seventh and youngest child of Silvester Horne and his wife, Katherine Maria née Cozens-Hardy. Katherine's father was Herbert Cozens-Hardy, the Liberal MP for North Norfolk who became the Master of the Rolls in 1907 and Baron Cozens-Hardy on 1 July 1914. Silvester, a powerful orator, was a leading light in the Congregationalist movement, as minister at the Whitefield's Tabernacle, Tottenham Court Road from 1903 and, from 1910, chairman of the Congregational Union of England and Wales. Between 1910 and 1914 he was the Liberal Member of Parliament (MP) for Ipswich.

By 1913 Silvester was suffering from continual poor health. He resigned his position at the tabernacle on medical advice in January 1914, and intended to resign his parliamentary seat. On a speaking tour of the US and Canada he lectured at Yale University, and then travelled to Toronto; as the ferry he took entered harbour, he collapsed and died, aged 49; Horne was aged seven at the time. From September that year Horne attended St George's School, Harpenden as a boarder—the seventh of the Horne children to attend the school. (Note: In honour of the Horne family, the school later named one of the rooms Horne Hall, and Horne became a governor of the school.) Although he was not strong academically, he developed into a good sportsman, representing the school in rugby and cricket, and during the summer holidays took part in the Public Schoolboys Lawn Tennis Championship at Queen's Club; in his final appearance in 1925 he was knocked out by the future Wimbledon finalist Bunny Austin.

Horne enrolled at the London School of Economics in October 1925, where his tutors included Hugh Dalton and Stephen Leacock; he was dissatisfied with his time at the university and called Leacock "one of the most boring lecturers I ever came across". During the general strike in 1926 volunteers were asked to enlist at the Organisation for the Maintenance of Supplies to take over the essential services; Horne joined, and spent two days driving a London bus before the strike was called off. Through the influence and generosity of an uncle, Austin Pilkington of the Pilkington glassmaking family of St Helens, he was able to enrol at Magdalene College, Cambridge, in October 1926. He committed himself to the sporting side of life and represented the college at rugby, and in the relay team alongside the future Olympic gold medallist Lord Burghley. He also played tennis for the university, partnering Bunny Austin. Distracted by his athletic exploits, he neglected his studies and was sent down in December 1927.

Austin Pilkington was aggrieved at Horne's failure to make the most of the opportunity he had provided, and decided against offering the young man a post in the family firm. Despite the disappointment, through his contacts within the industry, he secured for the young Horne an interview with the Triplex Safety Glass Company at King's Norton, a district of Birmingham. Horne's sporting record commended him to the manager of the Triplex factory, and he was taken on as a management trainee on a modest salary. In September 1930, despite his unimpressive finances, he married Lady Mary Pelham-Clinton-Hope, daughter of the 8th Duke of Newcastle. The marriage was happy at first, but had broken down by 1932. Mary applied for an annulment in November 1932; she declared the reason was "the incapacity of the respondent [Charles Kenneth Horne] to consummate the marriage", which was dissolved in 1933, although the two remained on friendly terms thereafter.

When Horne's first marriage was dissolved, he was sought out by a former girlfriend, Joan Burgess, daughter of a neighbour at King's Norton. Unlike his first wife, she had much in common with him, including a liking for squash, tennis, golf and dancing. A month before her 21st birthday they were married, in September 1936. Joan became pregnant soon after the wedding, and in July 1937 a baby boy was delivered; he was stillborn.

=== Service in the RAF ===
In 1938 Horne enlisted in the Auxiliary Air Force on a part-time training scheme. He was commissioned as an acting pilot officer in No. 911 (County of Warwick) Squadron, a barrage balloon unit in Sutton Coldfield, and was called up into the RAF full-time on the outbreak of war. In the initial months of the conflict—the Phoney War—Horne's duties were undemanding, and he formed a concert party from his friends and colleagues. In November 1940 he was promoted to flight lieutenant, and to squadron leader a year later. In early 1942, the BBC producer Bill McLurg asked whether the RAF station at which Horne was based could put on an edition of his programme Ack-Ack, Beer-Beer. (Note: The title Ack-Ack, Beer-Beer was taken from the then-current phonetic alphabet for anti-aircraft and barrage balloon—the crews of which were programme's target audience; the programme was launched by the BBC in July 1940, and was broadcast twice-weekly. It eventually ran to 324 episodes.) Horne was ordered to put on the show, and he made his broadcasting debut on 16 April 1942, as the compere. Although the standard of the talent on the show was not high, McLurg was impressed with Horne's presentation, especially the way he hosted the programme's quiz; he invited Horne to be the programme's regular quizmaster, a role the latter fulfilled on over fifty Ack-Ack, Beer-Beer quizzes over the next two years. In January 1943 he became one of the show's regular comperes and presented the entire show for the first time.

In March 1943 Horne was posted to the Air Ministry in London. On 26 April 1944 he was promoted to the war substantive rank of squadron leader. Continuing to broadcast on Ack-Ack, Beer-Beer, he also began to write sketches for the programme, and make broadcasts on other shows, including the Overseas Recorded Broadcasting Service (ORBS), to be transmitted to British forces in the Middle East. His work with ORBS brought him into contact with Flight Lieutenant Richard Murdoch, who he jokingly introduced in one broadcast as "the station commander of Much-Binding-in-the-Marsh"; with a great deal in common in their backgrounds and a similar sense of humour, the pair quickly formed a friendship. Horne informed Murdoch of a squadron leader vacancy in his section at the Ministry, and Murdoch became his colleague. Murdoch, a professional actor and entertainer for 12 years before the war, recognised Horne's talent as a performer, and used his contacts to secure him more broadcasting work. (Note: Murdoch's most notable role before meeting Horne was in Band Waggon, with Arthur Askey in 1938 to 1939, before a stage tour in 1939 and a film in 1940.)

After Horne has been on holiday:
Murdoch: But sir, honestly you are looking sunburned, all except the top of your head.
Horne: Well Murdoch, it was pretty hot on the beach in Bermuda so I kept my bowler on most of the time.
Murdoch: Very wise of you sir. ...You are looking sunburned. Are you like that all over?
Horne: (pause) There's one little place that you really must see when you go to Bermuda, Murdoch...

— Much-Binding-in-the-Marsh, 1949

Ack-Ack, Beer-Beer came to an end in February 1944 when the BBC decided to direct their programming at the general armed forces, rather than the barrage balloon crews. A month later Horne and Murdoch had expanded the idea of the remote and fictitious Royal Air Force station, Much-Binding-in-the-Marsh. The pair took the idea to the BBC producer Leslie Bridgemont who was responsible for the show Merry-go-Round, which featured, in weekly rotation, shows based on the Army, Navy and RAF. Bridgemont included a Much-Binding-in-the-Marsh section in Merry-go-Round on 31 March 1944; Horne played "an officer so dim that even the other officers noticed", with Murdoch as his harassed second-in-command and Sam Costa as an "amiable chump who always got things wrong". (Note: Much-Binding-in-the-Marsh was broadcast intermittently until February 1946, when the last edition as part of Merry-go-Round was broadcast. The final show finished with Much-Binding airfield being closed, and Horne and Murdoch becoming civilians at the war's end.)

During 1944 Horne met and fell in love with Marjorie Thomas, a war widow with a young daughter. He was divorced in early 1945, and he and Thomas were married in November that year, three months after he had been demobilised.

=== Postwar, a double career: 1945–1958 ===
On his return to civilian life, Horne resumed working at Triplex, and was promoted to the position of sales director. Despite his subsequent joint career in broadcasting and business, his commercial activities always took precedence. He declared that his work on radio was only a hobby, and that he would give it up before his business career. He combined his two roles by working full-time, and writing scripts with Murdoch at weekends.

Sam Costa, the "amiable chump" of Much-Binding-in-the-Marsh

Much-Binding-in-the-Marsh had gained sufficient popularity over its run of 20 Merry-go-Round episodes to be given its own 39-week series beginning in January 1947. With the coming of peace, the supposed RAF station became a civil airport, and the show continued much as before, written by and starring Horne and Murdoch, with Sam Costa. Maurice Denham—described by Murdoch as a vocal chameleon—joined the cast and played over 60 roles. The programme became popular, with audiences of 20 million, and ran for four series until September 1950.

In March 1948 Horne appeared with Murdoch in six episodes of the BBC Television comedy series Kaleidoscope. In June that year he and Murdoch again appeared on television in a one-off sitcom, At Home, which they wrote. The following year Horne began his connection with Twenty Questions, an association that lasted, on-and-off, for 20 years. By the fourth series of Much-Binding in 1950, the listener figures had declined to a level that concerned the BBC and they decided against a fifth series. Rather than wait to see what other offers of work would come in from the Corporation, Horne and Murdoch signed the comedy to a 35-programme series on Radio Luxembourg between October 1950 and June 1951. The programme was poorly received on the commercial channel: Murdoch observed that "it wasn't really a great success—even my mother said it was rotten, and she was my greatest fan". After one series, the show returned to the BBC in 1951–1952, although renamed as Over to You. (Note: The show finally had its last run—renamed as Much Binding—between 1953 and 1954.) Murdoch and Horne again appeared together, in April 1952, on Desert Island Discs. (Note: The programme was broadcast on 22 April 1952; their choice was: Fats Waller and His Rhythm, "I'm Gonna Sit Right Down and Write Myself a Letter"; Georges Bizet's "Il fior che avevi a me tu dato" (from Carmen), Soloist: Enrico Caruso; John Tilley, "Cycling"; Andre Kostelanetz and his Orchestra, Night and Day; Ottorino Respighi, "Can-can" (from La Boutique fantasque), the Royal Philharmonic Orchestra, conducted by Efrem Kurtz; Fred Elizalde and His Music, "Melancholy Weeps"; Charles Trenet, "Boum!"; Bill Robinson, "Doin' The New Low-Down"; Irving Mills and his Hotsy Totsy Gang version. The luxury items chosen were a test your strength machine and a Mahjong set.)

In 1954, after nine years in his senior position at Triplex, and 27 years at the company, Horne accepted the position of managing director of the British Industries Fair, a government-backed organisation promoting British goods worldwide; he took up his position in July 1955. Much of the work involved liaising with foreign buyers and delegations, and he accompanied the Queen and the Duke of Edinburgh on visits to the annual fair. In 1956 the government withdrew its funding and the BIF closed. Horne received several attractive job offers, and chose the post of chairman and managing director of the toy manufacturers Chad Valley, where he was a success. In September that year he and Murdoch appeared in a one-off television programme Show for the Telly.

In January 1957 Horne appeared as the compere on the popular Saturday evening comedy and music radio show Variety Playhouse, initially for a run of four months, but soon extended until the end of June. He also began to write a weekly column for the women's magazine She, and to appear in an increasing number of other programmes. (Note: Horne's other work of 1957 included The Benny Hill Show, It's Magic, This Is Showbusiness, Pleasure Boat and Twenty Questions.) After his work on Variety Playhouse had finished, he and the programme's writers Eric Merriman and Barry Took prepared a script for a pilot episode of a new show, Beyond Our Ken. The show, in which Horne was joined by Kenneth Williams, Ron Moody, Hugh Paddick and Betty Marsden, was broadcast in October 1957.

=== A single career: 1958–1969 ===
The pilot episode of Beyond Our Ken was well received by the BBC, and they commissioned a series to start in April 1958. On 27 February that year—his 51st birthday—Horne suffered a debilitating stroke and was totally paralysed down his left-hand side and lost the power of speech. He underwent a course of intensive physiotherapy and was able to return home after two weeks. His voice returned when, during heavy massage on his left thigh, a sharp pain led to him shouting "You bugger!" at the physiotherapist. His doctor told him that the stroke was caused by the stress of combining a full-time business post with his broadcasting work. He also told Horne that when he had recovered he would never be fit enough to continue as before. Horne considered that it was not the physical problem of combining his two careers, but the mental strain of problems in his business life; accordingly he decided to give up commerce and concentrate on a career in entertainment. Because of the stroke, plans for Beyond Our Ken were suspended.

In April 1958 Horne eased himself back into broadcasting as chairman of Twenty Questions. This evidence of his recovery was sufficient for the BBC to begin recording Beyond Our Ken in June, in preparation for the broadcast of the first series between July and November. Beyond Our Ken was written around the imperturbable establishment figure of Horne, while the other performers played a "spectrum of characters never before heard on the radio", including the exaggeratedly upper class Rodney and Charles, the genteel pensioners Ambrose and Felicity, the cook Fanny Haddock—a parody of popular TV cook Fanny Cradock—and the gardener Arthur Fallowfield. The first episode was not well received by a sample audience, but the BBC decided to back Horne and his team, and the initial six-week contract was extended to 21 weeks. Before the series came to an end, a second had been commissioned to run the following year. (Note: Beyond Our Ken ran for seven series and two Christmas specials, with the final edition broadcast on 16 February 1964.) After the first series Moody was succeeded by Bill Pertwee; Took left after the second series, leaving Merriman to write the remaining programmes on his own.

The second series of Beyond Our Ken followed in 1959; a third in 1960. Horne also continued his work in television, hosting his own series, Trader Horne, and appearing on a number of other programmes. (Note: In 1960 Horne also appeared on Top Town, Meet Yourself, Laugh Line, Live a Borrowed Life and Ace High.) In April 1961 he made his second appearance on Desert Island Discs, this time unaccompanied by Murdoch. (Note: The programme was broadcast on 9 April 1961; Horne's choice was: Alexander Borodin's "Vladimir's Aria" (from Prince Igor), Soloist: Jussi Björling; Claude Debussy's "Clair de lune" (from Suite bergamasque), Soloist: Walter Gieseking; Johannes Brahms's String Quartet No. 3 in B flat major, the Amadeus String Quartet; Coleman Hawkins and his Orchestra, "Body and Soul"; Terry Saunders, "Something Wonderful"; Pyotr Ilyich Tchaikovsky's 1812 Overture, the Philharmonia Orchestra; Bing Crosby, "White Christmas"; Giacomo Puccini's "Si, mi chiamano Mimi" (from La bohème), Soloist: Renata Tebaldi, the Orchestra dell'Accademia Nazionale di Santa Cecilia, Rome, conducted by Tullio Serafin. His chosen book was an anthology of English verse, and his luxury item was a piece of crystal.) In October that year—three weeks after the fifth series of Beyond Our Ken began recording—Horne appeared as the anchorman on a new BBC television series, Let's Imagine, a discussion programme which ran for 20 editions over 18 months. He was the subject of This Is Your Life in February 1962, hosted by Eamonn Andrews, in which guests included friends and colleagues from his connections in business and entertainment. In June 1963 he began Ken's Column, a series of 15-minute one-man programmes for Anglia Television.

The seventh series of Beyond Our Ken finished in February 1964, with an average audience of ten million listeners per programme. In September that year Horne returned from holiday and was scheduled to appear in a number of programmes; Eric Merriman objected to Horne's activities, saying that Horne had been made into a star by the writer, and that "no other comedy series should be allowed to use him". When the BBC refused to withdraw Horne from the second programme, Down with Women, Merriman resigned from writing Beyond Our Ken and the show came to an end. After some pressure from Horne to keep the remainder of the team together, the BBC commissioned a replacement series, Round the Horne, on similar lines. They turned to one of the original writers of Beyond Our Ken, Barry Took and his new writing partner, Marty Feldman. Horne remained the genial and unflappable focal figure, and the writers invented several new and eccentric characters to revolve round him. They included J. Peasemold Gruntfuttock, the walking slum; the Noël Coward parodies Charles and Fiona; the incompetent villain Dr. Chou En Ginsberg; the folk singer Rambling Syd Rumpo and the "outrageously camp" Julian and Sandy. The resulting programme was described by radio historians Andy Foster and Steve Furst as "one of the seminal comedies to come out of the BBC", while The Spectator described it as "one of the great radio successes". The first series of Round the Horne, consisting of 16 episodes, ran from March to June 1965. Horne's role was to provide "the perfect foil to the inspired lunacy happening all around him":

Horne	My name is Lord Tantamount Horseposture. Whilst on a world cruise with my young, incredibly beautiful daughter, Wisteria, played incredibly by Betty Marsden, and her fiancé, the Reverend Isambard Mousepractice—played by tiny, agile Hugh Paddick—we were shipwrecked. Only timely intervention by my butler, exquisitely portrayed by Bolivian Sex Goddess Kenneth Williams, saved us from disaster ... And see there—dominating the island, the sacred volcano of Gonga—played by Douglas Smith with a hole in his head and steam coming out of his ears.
Paddick	What an awesome sight—snow mantling his mighty summit and lava oozing down his sides.
Smith	That's porridge, actually. I had a hurried breakfast this morning.
Horne	Shut up, Smith, you're a volcano. You just loom over us and rumble ominously.
Smith	Yes, I told you. I had a hurried breakfast.
Horne	Shut up, Smith.
Smith	Rumble rumble
Horne	That's better

On 7 October 1966, at the age of 59, Horne suffered a major heart attack. (Note: There was a problem with heart weakness in the Horne family: his father had been 49, his eldest brother had been 51 and his eldest sister had been 65 when they had all died from heart attacks. Two of Horne's nephews needed bypass surgery.) He was much weakened, and was unfit to work for three months. As a result, he did not appear in the Round the Horne Christmas special. He returned to work in January 1967 to record the third series.

Round the Horne ran to four series, broadcast in successive years, and finished in June 1968. Three weeks after the fourth series finished, the first episode of Horne A'Plenty was broadcast on ITV. In a sketch show format, and with Barry Took as script editor (and later producer), this was an attempt to translate the spirit of Round the Horne to television, although with different actors supporting Horne: Graham Stark, for example, substituted for Kenneth Williams and Sheila Steafel for Betty Marsden. The first six-part series ran from 22 June to 27 July 1968, the second (by which time ABC had become Thames Television) from 27 November to 1 January 1969.

=== Death and tributes ===
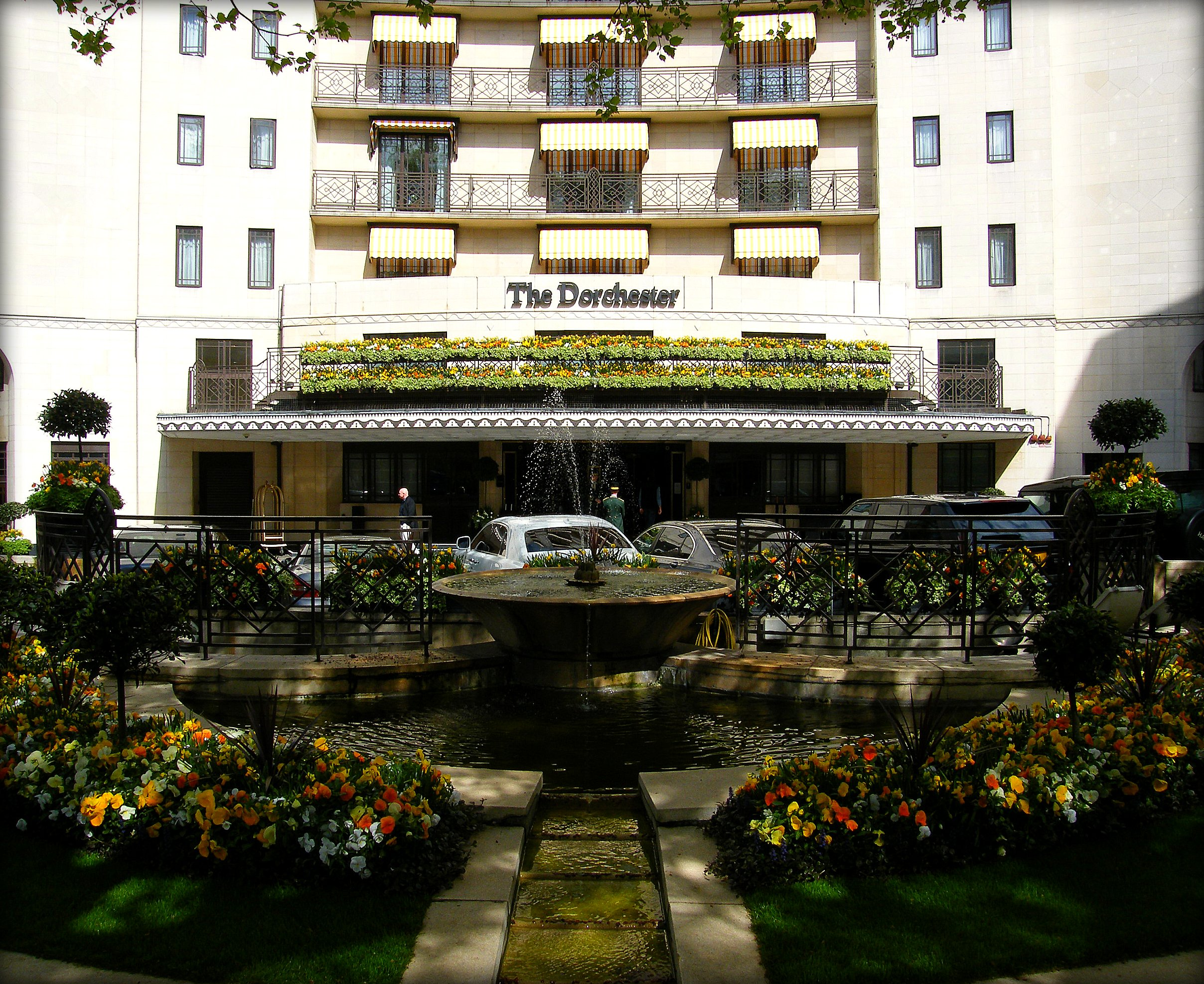
The Dorchester, where Horne suffered his second, fatal heart attack

Because of his heart condition, Horne had been prescribed an anticoagulant, but had stopped taking it on the advice of a faith healer. Horne died of a heart attack on 14 February 1969, while hosting the annual Guild of Television Producers' and Directors' Awards at the Dorchester hotel in London. Presenting the awards was Earl Mountbatten of Burma; an award had gone to Barry Took and Marty Feldman for their TV series Marty, and Horne had just urged viewers to tune into the fifth series of Round the Horne (which was due to start on 16 March) when he fell from the podium. The televised recording of the event omitted the incident, with announcer Michael Aspel explaining, "Mr Horne was taken ill at this point and has since died." A memorial service was held at St Martin-in-the-Fields in March that year. (Note: Horne's ashes were interred at the Stoke Poges Memorial Gardens, Buckinghamshire, adjacent to the Church of St Giles where the poet Thomas Gray completed his Elegy Written in a Country Churchyard.)

After his death, Horne was eulogised in The Times as "a master of the scandalous double-meaning delivered with shining innocence", while The Sunday Mirror called him "one of the few personalities who bridged the generation gap" and "perhaps the last of the truly great radio comics." In the December 1970 issue of The Listener, Barry Took recalled Round the Horne and said of its star:

He was an unselfish performer, but it was still always his show. You just knew it. A Martian would have known it. His warmth tempered the sharpness of the writing ... To say that everyone loved him sounds like every obituary ever written – nonetheless it's true ... Horne was one of the few great men I have met, and his generosity of spirit and gesture have, in my experience, never been surpassed. I mourn him still.

On hearing the news Kenneth Williams wrote in his diary that "I loved that man. His unselfish nature, his kindness, tolerance and gentleness were an example to everyone". In The Sunday Times in February 1969, Paul Jennings wrote of him: "If I ever knew a gentleman, it was Kenneth Horne. ... He gave you his whole attention, his whole courtesy. And what a courtesy it was! ... I knew him in the context of panel games, to which his marvellous unforced humour, spontaneous but beautifully timed, always added sparkle."

== Technique ==
Horne's friend Barry Took considered that "Horne's rich, fruity voice and warm patrician manner made him the ideal link man and that, coupled with a mischievous sense of humour, ensured that any programme in which he was involved was the better for his presence". Horne attributed his voice and delivery "to 'the Grace of God', his grandfather Lord Cozens-Hardy, the former Master of the Rolls, and the hard training of being 'a jovial chap among the golf and motoring fraternity'."

The obituarist for The Times highlighted Horne's "remarkably skilful but very personal comic technique" of playing "a friendly good-natured old buffer who was simply doing his best, apparently lost in wonder, at the glossier, more spectacular talents of those among whom he found himself". The media analysts Frank Krutnik and Steve Neale see a similar role, and consider that "Horne functioned, like [Jack] Benny, [Fred] Allen and [Tommy] Handley before him, as a 'stooge' rather than a joke-wielder, frequently switching roles between announcer and in-sketch performer".

In Round the Horne, as well as acting as link man, Horne also played other character roles in the film and melodrama spoofs, but always sounded exactly like Kenneth Horne. Referring to his ability with voices, he commented that "between them Betty, Ken W., Hugh and Bill Pertwee can provide at least 100 voices, and if you take me into account the figure leaps to 101." Williams reported that Horne had a card index mind, "in which there seemed to be stored every funny voice, every dialect, every comedy trick, which he knew that each member of the cast was capable of", and would suggest a change in approach if a line did not work during rehearsals.

Graham Ball, writing in the Sunday Express observed that Horne "didn't tell jokes in the usual manner, didn't have a catchphrase and never resorted to blue comedy". Ball also identified that Horne's "stage character, that of a slightly bufferish English gent, was adored by middle- and working-class audiences alike. His humour was original, almost underplayed, but the effortless delivery and uncanny timing concealed an almost anarchic sense of mischief."

== Legacy ==
By 24 February 1969 it had been decided that Round the Horne could not continue without its star. As a result, the scripts for Series Five (which Horne had jokingly suggested should be subtitled 'The First All-Nude Radio Show') were hastily adapted into a new series for Kenneth Williams called Stop Messing About, which ran for two series but was widely judged a failure and discontinued in 1970. On the first day of recording the new show, Williams wrote in his diary that "I miss [Horne] dreadfully. I could weep for all that goodness gone from our atmosphere at the show".

A successful stage show called Round the Horne ... Revisited opened in London in October 2003, compiled by Series Four co-writer Brian Cooke from original scripts. It ran until April 2005, and also generated three nationwide tours and a BBC television film. On 27 February 2007 (Horne's centenary), BBC Radio 4 broadcast a half-hour documentary tribute entitled Sound the Horne, hosted by Jimmy Carr. The following year, on 18 September, another Radio 4 documentary was broadcast; called Thoroughly Modest Mollie, this focused on Horne's frequent ghost-writer, Mollie Millest. A new show, devised by Barry Took's widow Lyn, called Round the Horne – Unseen and Uncut, toured in 2008 and 2009. In 2009 an unbroadcast pilot script written by Horne and Millest in 1966 was produced by the same Radio 4 team. Called Twice Ken is Plenty and intended as a two-man showcase for Horne and Kenneth Williams, it was broadcast on 1 September 2009.

Horne has been the subject of two biographies, Norman Hackforth's Solo for Horne in 1976 and Barry Johnston's Round Mr Horne: The Life of Kenneth Horne in 2006. In 1998 Ernie Wise unveiled a blue plaque to Horne at BBC Broadcasting House. Editions of Beyond Our Ken and Round the Horne are regularly broadcast on the digital radio service BBC Radio 4 Extra, and by 2006 over half a million copies of tapes and CDs of Round the Horne had been sold by the BBC. In a 2002 survey conducted by the BBC to find listeners' favourite British comedian, Horne appeared third, behind Tony Hancock and Spike Milligan.

== Career history ==
=== Selected radio broadcasts ===
Broadcast	Date	Notes	Refs.
Ack-Ack, Beer-Beer	16 April 1942 – 27 February 1944		
Much-Binding-in-the-Marsh, as part of Merry-Go-Round	31 March 1944 – 1 February 1946	20 episodes	
Much-Binding-in-the-Marsh	2 January 1947 – 13 September 1950; 30 October 1950 – 17 June 1951	Four series on BBC Radio until September 1950; on Radio Luxembourg for one series	
Twenty Questions	22 December 1949 – 1968	As chairman, 1949–1951, 1954, 1961–1968; as panellist, 1953, 1956, 1958, 1959	
Over to You	30 September 1951 – 14 April 1952	Successor to Much-Binding-in-the-Marsh	
The Forces Show	30 September 1952 – 24 March 1953		
Much Binding	21 July 1953 – 23 March 1954		
Richard Murdoch and Kenneth Horne Talking it Over	22 December – 25 December 1954		
Beyond Our Ken	1 July 1958 – 16 February 1964	Seven series and two Christmas specials	
Top of the Form	September 1965 – 1966		
Round the Horne	7 March 1965 – 9 June 1968	Four series and two Christmas specials	

=== Selected television appearances ===
Programme	Date	Channel	Notes	Refs.
Kaleidoscope: "Sir! I have an Idea"	5 March – 14 May 1948	BBC Television		
At Home	3 June 1948	BBC Television	with Richard Murdoch and Sam Costa	
Free and Easy	9 October 1953	BBC Television	with Richard Murdoch	
Down You Go	April 1953 – September 1954	BBC Television		
Once Upon a Time	28 July 1954	BBC Television		
Find the Link	November 1954 – 1955	BBC Television	Series ran for seven months	
What's My Line	November 1955	BBC Television		
Bless 'Em All	9 May 1955	BBC Television		
Camera One	January – September 1956	BBC Television		
Opening Night	22 August 1956	BBC Television		
Show for the Telly	21 September 1956	BBC Television	with Richard Murdoch	
Trader Horne	1958–1960	Tyne Tees Television		
Top Town	1960	BBC Television	Eight-week series	
Let's Imagine	3 November 1961 – 1963	BBC Television	18-month series	
Ken's Column	June 1963	Anglia Television		
Home and Around	1965–1966	Tyne Tees Television		
Treasure Hunt	1965–1966	Westward Television	This is not to be confused with the later Kenneth Kendall–Anneka Rice show of the same name.	
Top Firm	10 December 1965 –	BBC Television		
Happy Families	February – May 1967	Southern Television		
Celebrity Challenge	May 1967 –	Southern Television		
Strictly for Laughs	August 1967 –	ABC Weekend TV		
Horne A'Plenty	29 June – 27 July 1968	ABC Weekend TV	Series one	
Horne A'Plenty	27 November 1968 – 1 January 1969	Thames Television	Series two	

== Notes and references ==
=== Sources ===
- Binfield, Clyde (2004). "Horne, (Charles) Silvester (1865–1914)". Oxford Dictionary of National Biography. Oxford University Press. doi:10.1093/ref:odnb/37569. (subscription, Wikipedia Library access or UK public library membership required)
- Chignell, Hugh (2011). Public Issue Radio: Talks, News and Current Affairs in the Twentieth Century. London: Palgrave Macmillan. ISBN 978-0-230-24739-0.
- Foster, Andy; Furst, Steve (1996). Radio Comedy, 1938–1968: A Guide to 30 Years of Wonderful Wireless. London: Virgin Books. ISBN 978-0-86369-960-3.
- Hackforth, Norman (1976). Solo for Horne: A Biography of Kenneth Horne. London: Angus & Robertson. ISBN 0-207-95650-2.
- Johnston, Barry (2006). Round Mr Horne: The Life of Kenneth Horne. London: Aurum Press. ISBN 1-84513-123-1.
- Krutnik, Frank; Neale, Steve (2006). Popular Film and Television Comedy. London: Routledge. ISBN 978-1-134-94686-0.
- Lewisohn, Mark (1998). Radio Times Guide to TV Comedy. London: BBC Books. ISBN 978-0-563-36977-6.
- Mathew, Theobald; Pottle, Mark (2004). "Hardy, Herbert Hardy Cozens-, first Baron Cozens-Hardy (1838–1920)". Oxford Dictionary of National Biography. Oxford University Press. doi:10.1093/ref:odnb/32605. (subscription, Wikipedia Library access or UK public library membership required)
- Medhurst, Andy (2005). A National Joke: Popular Comedy and English Cultural Identities. Abingdon, Oxford: Psychology Press. ISBN 978-0-203-02256-6.
- Senelick, Laurence (1992). Gender in Performance: The Presentation of Difference in the Performing Arts. Lebanon, NH: University Press of New England. ISBN 978-0-87451-604-3.
- Street, Sean (2009). The A to Z of British Radio. Plymouth, Devon: Scarecrow Press. ISBN 978-0-8108-7013-0.
- Took, Barry (1981). Laughter in the Air: An Informal History of British Radio Comedy. London: Robson Books. ISBN 978-0-86051-149-6.
- Took, Barry (1998). Round the Horne: The Complete and Utter History. London: Macmillan Publishers. ISBN 978-0-7522-2119-9.
- Took, Barry (2004). "Horne, (Charles) Kenneth (1907–1969)". Oxford Dictionary of National Biography. Oxford University Press. doi:10.1093/ref:odnb/37568. (subscription, Wikipedia Library access or UK public library membership required)
- Williams, Kenneth; Davies, Russell (1993). The Kenneth Williams Diaries. London: HarperCollins. ISBN 978-0-00-255023-9.
