= Round the Horne =

1960s BBC radio comedy

- Genre: Sketch comedy
- Running time: 30 minutes
- Country of origin: United Kingdom
- Home station: BBC Light Programme (series 1–3); BBC Radio 2 (s 4)
- Starring: Kenneth Horne; Kenneth Williams; Hugh Paddick; Betty Marsden; Bill Pertwee (s 1–3)
- Announcer: Douglas Smith
- Written by: Barry Took (s 1–4); Marty Feldman (s 1–3); Johnnie Mortimer (s 4); Brian Cooke (s 4); Donald Webster (s 4)
- Produced by: John Simmonds
- Recording studio: Paris Theatre, London
- Original release: 7 March 1965 – 9 June 1968
- No. of series: 4 (+ 2 Christmas specials)
- No. of episodes: 67

Round the Horne is a BBC Radio comedy programme starring Kenneth Horne, first transmitted in four series of weekly episodes from 1965 until 1968. The show was created by Barry Took and Marty Feldman, who wrote the first three series. The fourth was written by Took, Johnnie Mortimer, Brian Cooke and Donald Webster.

Horne's supporting cast comprised Kenneth Williams, Hugh Paddick, Betty Marsden and, in the first three series, Bill Pertwee. The announcer was Douglas Smith, who also took part in the sketches. All except the last series featured music by Edwin Braden, played by the band "the Hornblowers", with a song in the middle of each show performed by the close-harmony singing group the Fraser Hayes Four; in the fourth series, the music was by Max Harris with a smaller group of players than the earlier series.

The show was the successor to Beyond Our Ken, which had run from 1958 to 1964 with largely the same cast. By the time the new series began, television had become the dominant broadcasting medium in Britain, and Round the Horne, which built up a regular audience of 15 million, was the last radio show to reach so many listeners. Horne was surrounded by larger-than-life characters including the camp pair Julian and Sandy, the disreputable eccentric J. Peasmold Gruntfuttock, and the singer of dubious folk songs, Rambling Syd Rumpo, who all became nationally familiar. The show encountered periodic scrutiny from the BBC management for its double entendres, but consistently received the backing of the director-general of the BBC, Sir Hugh Greene. Horne died suddenly in 1969; the BBC decided that Round the Horne could not continue without its star and they cancelled plans for a fifth series that year.

Over the following decades Round the Horne has been re-broadcast continually, and all 67 shows have been published on CD. In 2019, in a poll run by Radio Times, Round the Horne was voted the BBC's third-best radio show of any genre, and the best radio comedy series of all.

== History ==
=== Background ===
In 1957 the radio presenter and comedian Kenneth Horne was the compere on the popular Saturday evening comedy and music radio show Variety Playhouse. The programme's writers were Eric Merriman and Barry Took, and when the series came to an end, they prepared a script for a pilot episode of a new show, Beyond Our Ken. The show, in which Horne was joined by Kenneth Williams, Ron Moody, Hugh Paddick and Betty Marsden, was broadcast in October 1957. The series was due to begin in April 1958, but in February Horne suffered a debilitating stroke; he was temporarily paralysed down his left-hand side and lost the power of speech. The BBC postponed the series. After physiotherapy Horne was able to begin recording Beyond Our Ken in June, in preparation for the broadcast of the first series between July and November.

Beyond Our Ken was written around the imperturbable establishment figure of Horne, while the other performers played a "spectrum of characters never before heard on the radio", including the exaggeratedly upper class Rodney and Charles (Williams and Paddick), the genteel, dotty pensioners Ambrose and Felicity (Williams and Marsden), the hoarse-voiced cook Fanny Haddock – a parody of the television cook Fanny Cradock (Marsden), the earthy gardening guru Arthur Fallowfield (Williams), the semi-articulate rock and roll singer Ricky Livid (Paddick) and Hankie Flowered, a parody of the comedian Frankie Howerd (Bill Pertwee). The first episode was not well received by a sample audience, but the BBC decided to back Horne and his team, and the initial six-week contract was extended to 21 weeks. Before the series came to an end, a second had been commissioned to run the following year. (Note: Beyond Our Ken ran for seven series and two Christmas specials, with the final edition broadcast on 16 February 1964.) After the first series Moody was succeeded by Pertwee; Took left after the second series, leaving Merriman to write the remaining programmes on his own.

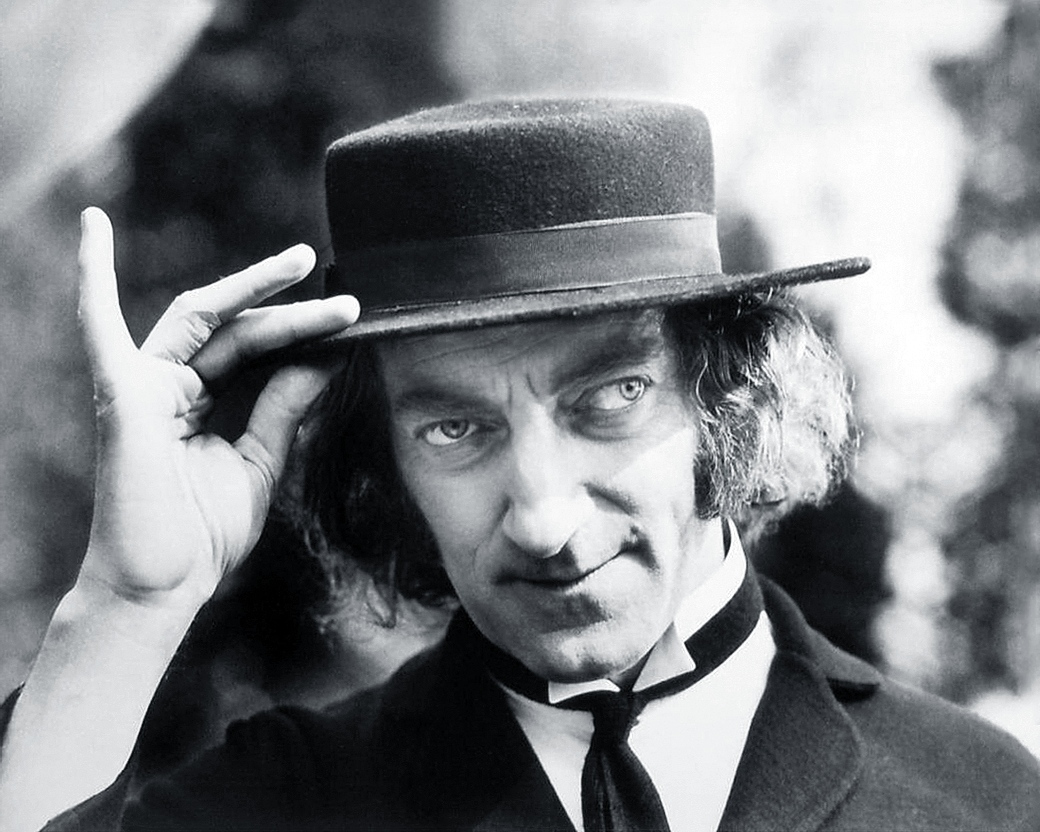
Feldman in 1972

After the seventh series of Beyond Our Ken ended Horne was scheduled to appear in a number of other BBC programmes; Eric Merriman objected, contending that he had made Horne into a star, and that "no other comedy series should be allowed to use him", according to Horne's biographer, Barry Johnston. When the BBC refused to withdraw Horne from the programme Down with Women, Merriman resigned from writing Beyond Our Ken and the show came to an end. After some pressure from Horne to keep the remainder of the team together, the BBC commissioned Round the Horne as a replacement on similar lines. They turned to Took, as one of the original writers of Beyond Our Ken, and his new writing partner, Marty Feldman. The name of the programme came from a pun on Horne's name, combined with the naval term "round the Horn", meaning to navigate the waters at the southern tip of South America, Cape Horn. The pair aimed to write what they described as "down-market material in an upmarket way". The scripts they produced led to a faster-paced programme than Beyond Our Ken, including more allusions to contemporary events, including politics and films.

=== Format ===
Round the Horne was based on a revue format, and contained parody and satire. The programme would include an introduction from Horne, who would sometimes give answers to a supposed quiz from the previous week, and then lead into sketches that would include a set-piece based on a film or novel, such as "The Man with the Golden Thunderball", and "The Three Musketeers". Martin Dibbs, in his history of the BBC Variety Department, writes that "the show was characterised by incessant innuendo and camp representation to an extent never before tolerated within the BBC."

As in Beyond Our Ken, there was a cast of recurring characters. Took and Feldman developed new characters for Williams, Paddick, Marsden and Pertwee, whose ability to change between personas produced a programme described by the radio historians Andy Foster and Steve Furst as "a cast of thousands played by the same four accomplished actors". Horne's role was described in The Daily Telegraph as providing "the perfect foil to the inspired lunacy happening all around him". The media analysts Frank Krutnik and Steve Neale consider that as such, Horne's role was similar to that of Jack Benny, Fred Allen and Tommy Handley, "as a 'stooge' rather than a joke-wielder, frequently switching roles between announcer and in-sketch performer".

=== Broadcasts ===
==== 1965–1966: Series 1 and 2 ====
The first episode of Round the Horne was broadcast on the Light Programme on 7 March 1965. It was described in Radio Times as "Five characters in search of the authors". The series consisted of 16 episodes and ran to 20 June 1965. The programme was produced by John Simmonds and included music from the Fraser Hayes Four and the studio orchestra, "the Hornblowers", conducted by Paul Fenoulhet; from episode six, Fenoulhet was replaced by Edwin Braden. Douglas Smith, an announcer and newsreader on the Home Service and the Third Programme, was used as the programme's announcer, but was given a larger role as the series progressed; he ended up advertising spoof products and giving human sound effects in addition to his normal role.

One of the early episodes included a sketch by Horne, a monologue based on "the centenary of the birth of the crumpet", including a huge crumpet built for Queen Victoria.

As an added novelty he hollowed out the centre and a Gaiety Girl was secreted inside. When the loyal toast was drunk, she leapt out, wearing pink combs and waving a Union Jack – either that or the other way round, I don't remember. In any event the whole affair was a great success and, as many people commented afterwards 'it was a smashing bit of crumpet'.

The sketch angered the strongly-conservative Member of Parliament Sir Cyril Black, who wrote to the BBC to complain. Frank Gillard, the BBC's director of radio, wrote to Dennis Morris, the chief of the Light Programme, asking Round the Horne to "watch its step, particularly over the next few weeks and keep itself within reasonable bounds". Instead, Took and Feldman wrote a riposte that Horne read at the end of the following programme, addressed to the "minority of killjoys" who complained:

Let me say to them that our scripts are whiter than white, as is the face of the producer when he reads them. You see, evil is in the eye of the beholder – and we believe you can make anything sound as if it has a double meaning – if you know how. So cheerio, see you next week.

Further complaints about the programme were received and Sir Hugh Greene, the director-general of the BBC, asked to see the scripts before broadcasting. All were returned with the words "I see nothing to object to in this" written on them. (Note: Took later asked Greene why he had consistently stood up for Round the Horne; Greene told him, "Well, I like dirty shows".) The complaints continued from Black, and from Mary Whitehouse – a campaigner against social liberalism – about the cast putting emphasis on certain words. Took replied that "When Laurence Olivier plays Hamlet he puts emphasis on certain words – it's called acting".

A second series was commissioned, and ran for thirteen weeks, from Sunday 13 March to 5 June 1966. The programme was recorded in front of a studio audience, and Williams would play up to them with physical humour, causing hilarity in the studio. Simmonds spoke to the cast, telling them that the radio audience were hearing unexplained laughter, and to try to keep the visual pranks to a minimum. At the end of the series Roy Rich, the head of BBC Light Entertainments for radio, spoke to Took, Feldman, Horne and Williams and discussed possible changes to the programme, including the removal of the Fraser Hayes Four, and the possible changing of Pertwee and Marsden. No changes were made before the next series was commissioned.

On 7 October 1966, at the age of 59, Horne suffered a severe heart attack. (Note: Horne was concerned that the BBC would refuse to employ him again if they knew he had a heart attack, so he told them he was suffering from pleurisy.) He was much weakened, and was unfit to work for three months. As a result, he did not appear in the Round the Horne Christmas special, which was recorded on 28 November. He returned to work in January 1967 to record the third series.

==== 1967–1968: Series 3 and 4 ====
The third series ran for 21 episodes from 5 February to 25 June 1967. After recording the first episode, Williams wrote in his diary that "the script was singularly uninspired I think – no innovations or bright ideas for the beginning of a new series ... For the first time I am beginning to feel that this show is rather dated and tired". The BBC hierarchy also thought the first show was slightly lacking and Williams was also downbeat after the second recording, writing that "I think the show is quite dead artistically and the format has completely atrophied itself – it is moribund now. I think I will withdraw after this series". Trying to turn the show around, Took and Feldman wrote out the popular camp Julian and Sandy characters (played by Paddick and Williams) from the third episode, but the cast and Simmonds all insisted they were put back, so the writers duly obliged. After a few weeks the show had settled down and Williams recorded in his diary that the recording "went v. well. Script was v. good indeed and the audience splendid – a great deal of affection there, one felt".

Feldman became increasingly successful on television, particularly with At Last the 1948 Show (1967); he decided to concentrate on writing and performing on the screen and left the series. Took agreed to stay, and he was joined by Johnnie Mortimer, Brian Cooke and – for the first six episodes of the next series – Donald Webster. In September 1967 BBC radio was radically reorganised. The Home Service, Third Programme and Light Programme were abolished and replaced by four new national channels – Radio 1, 2, 3 and 4; Round the Horne moved from the Light Programme to Radio 2. The change came with reduced budgets. The Fraser Hayes Four and Edwin Braden and the Hornblowers were replaced with a small instrumental group led by Max Harris, and Pertwee was dropped from the programme. The cost fell from £601 a show in series 3 to £486 in series 4. That year's Christmas special was broadcast with the new line-up and writers.

The fourth series began on 25 February 1968 and ran for 16 episodes to 9 June. After the first episode Williams was unimpressed with the new material, and wrote in his diary "Now there are 4 writers on it! It is unbelievable really. Four! For half an hour of old crap with not a memorable line anywhere ... of course one goes on and flogs it gutless and the rubbish gets by". Without Feldman, Took was enjoying the show less than he had previously. He also felt the humour was becoming more obviously dirty and complained to Williams that "We might as well write a series called Get Your Cock Out".

Horne died of a heart attack on 14 February 1969, while hosting the annual Guild of Television Producers' and Directors' Awards at the Dorchester hotel in London. An award had gone to Took and Feldman for their television series Marty, and Horne had just urged viewers to tune into the fifth series of Round the Horne – which was due to start on 16 March – when he fell from the podium. By 24 February 1969 it had been decided that Round the Horne could not continue without its star. As a result, the scripts for series five – which Horne had jokingly suggested should be subtitled "The First All-Nude Radio Show" – were hastily adapted into a new series for Williams called Stop Messing About, which ran for two series before it was dropped from the schedule in 1970.

== Main regular characters ==
The cast of Round the Horne, 1968. Left to right: Hugh Paddick, Kenneth Williams, Kenneth Horne, Betty Marsden, Douglas Smith

=== Kenneth Horne ===
The persona adopted by the writers for Horne was not greatly different from his real-life one, and largely the same as that of his Beyond Our Ken character: the urbane, unflappable, tolerant but sometimes surprised central figure, around whom the other characters revolved. The Times called Horne the "master of the scandalous double-meaning delivered with shining innocence", (Note: Horne was on record as saying, "If ever I see a double entendre, I whip it out".) and in Round the Horne he combined the role of straight man to the flamboyant Julian and Sandy, Rambling Syd Rumpo and J. Peasmold Gruntfuttock with that of genial host of the show. Feldman called him "the best straight man I had ever seen", who nonetheless had "a lot of funny lines"; Jonathan Rigby, who played Horne in a stage show, Round the Horne ... Revisited, thought him "a stand-up comedian with a posh accent ... part of his genius was that he was able to be himself".

Horne introduced some programmes by reading out the answers to last week's (non-existent) questions:

The answer to question one: complete the first lines of the following songs – "If I Were a Blackbird I'd ..." The answer is I'd Whistle and Sing, and I positively will not accept any other suggestion. The second song was "There's a Rainbow Round My ..." Now we got an amazing number of replies to this. We haven't had so many since we asked you to complete "Over My Shoulder Goes ..." Really, it makes it very difficult for us to keep up the high reputation for sophisticated comedy we've never had.

At other times he would give a short lecture on justly forgotten figures from history, such as Robert Capability Lackwind, allegedly the inventor of Toad in the Hole, or Nemesis Fothergill, known to ornithologists – and the police – as the Birdman of Potter's Bar. In many episodes his opening slot was announcing the day's forthcoming events, such as International free style gnome fingering at the five-minute Hippo Wash Brompton Oratory, Swan Upping at Downham and Swan Downing at Upham, and the two-man Rabbi bob sled championship down the escalators at Leicester Square tube station. He would close the programmes by commenting on the final sketch, or announcing a competition to complete a limerick with two fecund opening lines ("A young market gardener from Bude, Developed a cactus quite lewd ...") or with a public service announcement such as this police message:

If any passer-by in Lisle Street last Saturday night witnessed a middle-aged man stagger out of the Peeperama strip club and get knocked down by a passing cyclist, would you please keep quiet about it as my wife thinks I was in Folkestone. Goodbye. See you next week.

=== Douglas Smith ===
At the start of the first series of Round the Horne Douglas Smith took the traditional role of a BBC announcer on comedy shows, introducing the programme and its component parts and reading the credits at the end. As the show developed, the writers gave him more to do. In the second series Smith continually interrupts the programme to promote "Dobbiroids Magic Rejuvenators" (from "the makers of Dobbins Medical Cummerbunds for horses") and Dobbimist horse deodorant for UFO ("under fetlock odour"). In the third and fourth series he is included in the movie spoofs, playing a range of roles including a rumbling volcano:

Horne: ... And see there – dominating the island, the sacred volcano of Gonga – played by Douglas Smith with a hole in his head and steam coming out of his ears.
Paddick: What an awesome sight – snow mantling his mighty summit and lava oozing down his sides.
Smith: That's porridge, actually. I had a hurried breakfast this morning.
Horne: Shut up, Smith, you're a volcano. You just loom over us and rumble ominously.
Smith: Yes, I told you. I had a hurried breakfast.
Horne: Shut up, Smith.
Smith: Rumble rumble.
Horne: That's better.

His other roles include a telephone box, an inflatable rubber boat, a drophead Bentley and a cow:

Smith: Moo Moo – Splosh!
Horne: Splosh?
Smith: I kicked over the milk pail.

By the fourth series Smith has risen to the heights of playing the World ("You've just gone through my Khyber Pass travelling on a camel"), and in one programme he gets a solo singing spot, barracked by Paddick and Williams ("Letting an announcer sing! It's a disgrace!") performing "Nobody Loves a Fairy When she's Forty". (Note: A 1930s comic song with words and music by Arthur Le Clerq.)

=== Beatrice, Lady Counterblast, née Clissold ===
The first of the new characters was an elderly ex-Gaiety Girl (played by Marsden) known as Bea Clissold in her theatrical heyday, when she was "the pure brass of the music hall", (Note: Among the definitions of "brass" given by the Oxford English Dictionary and the lexicographer Eric Partridge is "A prostitute".) and subsequently an aristocratic widow. She has been much married and much divorced, and has retired to live in seclusion at Chattering Parva, waited on and complained about by her octogenarian butler, Spasm (Williams). Horne interviews her each week in the early programmes, when she reminisces about her life and husbands. In a commentary on the show's characters published in 1974 Took wrote, "Her anecdotes of past marriages combine the lurid with the turgid as the narrative flashes back on leaden wings to the turn of the century and the exploits of the young Bea Clissold". She appeared in the first programme of the series, and was a major feature of its early episodes. After she ceased to be one of the central characters she continually popped up with her catch phrase, "Many times, many, many times", originally referring to the number of times she was married, and later an all-purpose innuendo.

=== Julian and Sandy ===
From "Bona Bijou Tourettes":

Sandy: Jule had a nasty experience in Málaga
... he got badly stung.
Horne: Portuguese man o' war?
Julian: I never saw him in uniform.

The camp pair Julian and Sandy (played by Paddick and Williams) made their debuts in the fourth programme of the first series and rapidly established themselves as a permanent fixture throughout the run of Round the Horne. They are out of work actors whom Horne encounters each week in new temporary jobs. The writers' original idea was that the characters should be elderly and dignified Shakespearean actors filling in as domestic cleaners while "resting" (i.e. unemployed), but the producer, John Simmonds, thought they seemed rather sad, and at his suggestion Took and Feldman turned the characters into chorus boys. (Note: The old actor laddies were to be called J. Behemoth Cadogan and T. Hamilton Grosvenor. Took later wrote that he and Feldman named the chorus boys after Julian Slade and Sandy Wilson, the composers of the popular 1950s musicals Salad Days and The Boyfriend.) In a typical sketch Horne looks in at a new establishment, usually in Chelsea, with a title such as "Bona Tours", "Bona Books", "Bona Antiques" or "Bona Caterers", and is greeted with, "Oh hello, I'm Julian and this is my friend Sandy". The latter adds, using the gay and theatrical slang, palare, (Note: The most usual spelling, according to the Oxford English Dictionary is "polari", but Took and Feldman used the alternative "palare".) "How bona to vada your dolly old eek again", or "What brings you trolling in here?" (Note: "How good to see your nice old face again"; "What brings you walking into here?") Having first appeared as house cleaners, they are later shown working in a variety of implausible jobs. Took summed them up: "From working as part time domestics while 'resting' they progressed to running almost every trendy activity going from fox-hunting in Carnaby Street to the gents' outfitting department of MI5".

The use of palare enabled the writers to give Julian and Sandy some double entendres that survived BBC censorship because the authorities either did not know or did not admit to knowing their gay meaning. In one episode, Sandy tells Horne that Julian is a brilliant pianist: "a miracle of dexterity at the cottage upright", which to those familiar with gay slang could either refer to pianistic excellence or to – illegal – sexual activity in a public lavatory. (Note: In a study of British comedy published in 2011 Andy Medhurst writes: "'cottage upright' is a valid term for one variety of [piano], but what the writers, performers and subculturally attuned listeners all knew was that in Polari, 'cottage' meant those public toilets in which queer sex was a frequent occurrence. Sandy's line, therefore, is actually a proud announcement that Julian is particularly skilled at manipulating his own and other men's erect penises in locales often raided by police in search of prosecutions for what was legally deemed to be 'gross indecency'." A modest cottage upright may be seen at the Royal Academy of Music.) At the time of the first three series, gay male sex was a criminal offence in Britain. Julian and Sandy became nationally popular characters and are widely credited with contributing a little to the public acceptance of homosexuality that led to the gradual repeal of the anti-gay laws, beginning in 1967.

=== J. Peasmold Gruntfuttock ===
Gruntfuttock is guided by "voices" and one can only hope that one day they'll guide him into the Grand Union Canal.

— Barry Took.

A week after the debut of Julian and Sandy came the first appearance of J. Peasmold Gruntfuttock, first broadcast on 5 April 1965. (Note: This is the spelling used by Took and Feldman, although the variant "Peasemold" is sometimes seen in articles and books, and even on occasion "Peasemould".) Played by Williams, Gruntfuttock is described by the writers as "the walking slum". In his first appearance he is a job applicant at the BBC, inspired by voices in his head, and keen to get on close terms with one of the female presenters. In later programmes he is first the king and then dictator of Peasmoldia, a small enclave in the East End, and subsequently Brother Gruntfuttock, member of an obscure religious community. He writes in regularly with incorrect and sometimes physically implausible answers to last week's questions:

Finally, we had "I get a kick out of ...". Well, Mr Gruntfuttock of Hoxton, I think we all know what you get a kick out of. And on looking at the list you sent me it's my considered opinion that you are running a severe risk of doing yourself a permanent injury.

In the fourth series he is a persistent caller of the spoof phone-in, the Round the Horne Forum of the Air, airing his peculiar personal obsessions in between bouts of heavy breathing. He was Feldman's favourite Round the Horne character; the two authors wrote of Gruntfuttock, "He married beneath him – which gives you some idea what his wife Buttercup (Betty Marsden) must be like. All in all not a couple one would wish to meet on a dark night or indeed at any time."

=== Charles and Fiona ===
What would London's West End Theatre be without these ineffable thespians? How can one describe them without invoking the law of libel? They're earthquakingly, mind-bendingly, stomach-turningly, heart-stoppingly, knee-tremblingly awful.

— Barry Took.

Charles and Fiona are supposedly characters played by an extremely theatrical actor and actress: "ageing juvenile Binkie Huckaback" (Paddick) and Dame Celia Molestrangler (Marsden). The two, originally based on the theatre stars Alfred Lunt and Lynn Fontanne, were introduced in the eighth programme of the first series, and quickly became a fixture. They appeared in parodies of "stiff-upper-lip" dramas by Noël Coward and others; their fictitious plays had titles such as Present Encounter and Bitter Laughter. (Note: Coward's plays and films include Present Laughter, Brief Encounter and Bitter Sweet.) Their agonised love affairs are punctuated by brittle, staccato dialogue, in which they talk of their emotions in tortuous sentences:

Fiona: All I could think of back here was you out there thinking of me back here thinking of you out there – back here. Needing you, wanting you, wanting to need you, needing to want you.
Charles: I don't have the words for it.
Fiona: I know.
Charles: I know you know.
Fiona: I know you know I know.
Charles: Yes, I know.

Their sketches customarily end with an unexpected twist, such as the revelation that they are living in a telephone box, or are dining at the Ritz in the nude, or trysting in a refrigerator. Barry Took wrote that they were his own favourite Round the Horne characters. During the second series they were dropped in favour of a new feature, "The Seamus Android Show" (see below) but were quickly brought back.

=== Chou En Ginsberg and Lotus Blossom ===
In the ninth show of the first series Chou En Ginsberg (Williams) appeared for the first time. He is a parody of the stereotypical far-Eastern villain Fu Manchu. The first part of his name was borrowed from Chou En-Lai, the then Chinese premier; for comic contrast the writers wanted an incongruous second name and experimented with "Chou En Murphy" and "Chou En McWhirter" before settling on "Ginsberg". He always announces himself as "Dr Chou En Ginsberg, MA (Failed)". (Note: The device had appeared earlier in English comedy, in 1930, when the authors of 1066 and All That billed themselves as "Aegrot (Oxon)" and "Failed M.A., etc., Oxon", the latter referring to the Oxford tradition that those graduating as BA could for a fee upgrade their degree to MA, which the writer had lacked the money to do. But Took's use of the phrase was prompted by reading that in India some lawyers who had not passed their examinations would nevertheless practise and advertise themselves as "Master of Arts (failed)".) He appears regularly in the James Bond parodies, "Kenneth Horne, Master Spy", plotting a fiendish international crime, luring Horne into his clutches but then being outwitted. (Note: Although Took later confirmed that the sketches were essentially send-ups of the Bond films, the first one was titled "The Spy Who Came in With a Cold", à la John le Carré.)

Chou was joined in the next show by his concubine, Lotus Blossom (Paddick) who is, in the words of her master, common as muck. A drawing of the two by William Hewison in Took and Feldman's 1974 book Round the Horne shows a diminutive Chou alongside a large, looming and graceless Lotus Blossom bulging out of her cheongsam. Her attempts to entertain Special Agent Horne with her songs and dances cause him more distress than Chou's threats of death.

=== Rambling Syd Rumpo ===
Ah, the agony of the artist, and here is an artist who's been responsible for more agony than almost anyone alive: Rambling Syd Rumpo

— Horne, introducing him.

First heard in the tenth show of the first series, and a fixture thereafter, Rambling Syd (Williams) is an itinerant folk singer. The writers describe him as "one of the last of the breed of wandering minstrels who are fast dying out – thank heavens". Often misappropriating the tunes of genuine folk songs, Rambling Syd's lyrics consist of dubious-sounding nonsense words such as these, from the "Runcorn Splod Cobbler's Song":

I sing as I cobble and hammer my splod
Tho' my trumice glows hot and my trade be odd
I sit as I gorble and pillock my splee
For a cobbler's life is the life for me.

Or, to the tune of "Foggy Dew":

When I was a young man
I nadgered my splod
As I nurked at the wogglers' trade.
When suddenly I thought
While trussing up my groats,
I'd whirdle with a fair young maid.

Took said of the character that his "bogus ethnic patter and totally meaningless songs" created the illusion of "something terribly naughty going on" – but that any naughtiness was in fact in the listener's mind.

=== Daphne Whitethigh ===
The character was loosely based on the television cook Fanny Cradock. Described by Took and Feldman as "fashion reporter, TV cook, agony aunt, pain in the neck", Daphne Whitethigh (Marsden) is a hoarse-voiced pundit, "whose advice on the placing of the bosom or the way to prepare Hippo in its shell is an absolute must for all those trendy moderns who want to look and feel frightful". Among her helpful cooking tips are that although rhinoceros is not very appetising you do get marvellous crackling; her recipes for yak include yak à l'orange, yak in its jacket, and coupe yak. She advises followers of female fashion that bosoms are still out, but may be on the way back (Horne says he will keep a light burning in the window) and her other useful pointers include how to use cold cream to remove those baboon claw marks from one's hip, and how to avoid crow's feet round the eyes: refrain from sleeping in trees.

=== Seamus Android ===
Hello. All right, well now – ha ha. All right. Well I mustn't let my tongue run away with me. Now I know you can't wait to and neither can I, so I won't, and with that – goodnight

— Seamus Android.

Described by Took as "an unskilled television labourer whose gift of the blarney and wistful Irish charm could empty any theatre in three minutes", Seamus Android is a parody of the broadcaster Eamonn Andrews, whose weekly television chat show was broadcast live on Sunday evenings. Took and Feldman had appeared on Andrews's show and been astonished by "the non-sequiturs and other nonsense he came out with". Seamus Android was the only regular character played by Pertwee, who was otherwise cast as what Took called "the odds and ends" – the minor characters and straight parts. Android's interviewees include the much married actress Zsa-Zsa Poltergeist, the Hollywood producer Daryll F. Klaphanger, and the star of The Ipswich File, Michael Bane; promised appearances by such as Lord Ghenghiz Wilkinson, the dancing cloakroom attendant, Nemesis Poston, the juggling monk, and Anthony Wormwood-Nibblo, the Hoxton cat thief and heiress fail to materialise. As Pertwee was not in the cast for the last series, Android was dropped.

=== Dentures ===
Played by Paddick, this is the only regular Round the Horne character who had in all essentials already appeared in Beyond Our Ken, where he was named Stanley Birkinshaw. In Round the Horne he has no regular name, and appears in various capacities. He is a man with ill-fitting false teeth; his diction distorts all sibilants, and sprays saliva in all directions. Dentures often opens the show in the style of a toastmaster ("My lordsh, ladiesh and gentlemen," etc). In the second series he appears as "The Great Omipaloni, the world's fastest illusionist – and also the dampest". In the third series he is Buffalo Sidney Goosecreature, adversary of the Palone Ranger, and in the fourth he is Angus McSpray ("Rishe againsht the Shasshenachsh") to Williams's Bonnie Prince Charlie.

=== Julie Coolibah ===
The invention of Mortimer and Cooke, Julie Coolibah (Marsden) appears in the fourth season. She is an Australian visiting London, deeply suspicious of British men ("I know you Pommies are sex mad"). Every time she talks to Horne she interprets his innocent remarks as sexual overtures:

Horne: Good to have you back.
Julie: What do you mean by that?
Horne: Nothing, just extending the hand of friendship.
Julie: Yeah? With what purpose in mind, might I ask?

When Julie manages to find work in London she has constant difficulties coping with the men. As a bus conductress she is outraged when a passenger gives her fourpence and asks "How far can I go for that?" She tells Horne, "I cracked him with my cash-bag and put him off".

== Critical reception ==
Round the Horne is described by Foster and Furst as "one of the seminal comedies to come out of the BBC". The programme continued the comedy vein of The Goon Show and provided an influential link, through I'm Sorry, I'll Read That Again, to the work of the Monty Python writers and performers; at one point Monty Python was given the working title Barry Took's Flying Circus by the BBC. Round the Horne helped change the way the BBC dealt with broadcasting humour: "The ebullience of the ... comedy – not to mention the filth of the innuendos – swept away decades of insipid and paternalistic inhibition at the BBC", according to Richard Morrison, the chief arts correspondent of The Times.

Six years after the last series was first broadcast, The Daily Mirror called Round the Horne "the last great radio show". In 2002 The Spectator described it as "one of the great radio successes"; the following year William Cook wrote in The Guardian that the show "boasted a wonderful writing team" and "bestrode the airwaves like a colossus, reaching an audience of 15 million – the sort of ratings most current comedies can only dream about." In 2005 The Sunday Times referred to it as "One of the best-loved shows of all time." Punch commented that the series was probably the last comedy show on radio to have a huge following. According to Took, Round the Horne was broadcast when radio was considered to be on the wane when compared to television; such was the show's popularity, many thought radio would continue to be a leading form of entertainment.

Although Round the Horne attracted some adverse comments from Black, Whitehouse and others of similar views, the show was well received by the press. In 1967 The Times called it "half an hour of the purest impure entertainment", and as the third series came to an end the paper called for a Christmas special and a further series in the new year. "No-one, but no-one at all has yet presented those elegant queens, those touchily vulnerable bona-boys, those fashion fetichists so deftly, so pointedly, and, in the final accounting, so purely". In 1969 the paper commented that the show was "a success with lovers of the sophisticated pun" as well as appealing to "those who like a good belly laugh", with "obvious jokes ... mixed with clever word juggling".

In 1995, looking back at British radio comedy, The Guardian placed Round the Horne first in its list of the five greatest shows. (Note: The other four were The Goon Show, Hancock's Half Hour, The Navy Lark and Take It from Here.) In 2019, in a poll run by Radio Times, Round the Horne was voted the third best radio show of any kind, and the best comedy. (Note: It came behind Desert Island Discs and The Archers.)

== Legacy ==
=== Recordings ===
Here are the answers to last week's questions. First, the "Where Do You Find It?" question. The answer came in several parts, as follows: wound round a sailor's leg, on top of the wardrobe, floating in the bath, under a prize bull, and in a lay-by on the Watford Bypass. At least, I found one there, but I couldn't use it, because it was covered in verdigris.

— Horne, series 3, programme 1.

Recordings of all the episodes have been issued on CD by the BBC in its "Audiobooks" publications (2002):

- Series 1: Round the Horne, The Collector's Edition: March – June 1965. BBC. ISBN 978-0-563-53568-3.
- Series 2: Round the Horne, The Collector's Edition: March – June 1966. BBC. ISBN 978-1-78529-109-8.
- Series 3: Round the Horne, The Collector's Edition: February – June 1967. BBC. ISBN 978-1-78529-210-1.
- Series 4: Round the Horne, The Collector's Edition: February – June 1968. BBC. ISBN 978-1-78529-259-0.

In 2005, to mark the 40th anniversary of the show, the BBC published a boxed set containing all episodes, on 35 CDs, with an accompanying 3-hour, 3-disc set "Round The Horne: The Complete and Utter History", written and narrated by Took: Round the Horne: The Complete Radio Archive (Audio CD). BBC Audiobooks. 2005. ISBN 978-0-5635-2749-7.

By 2006 over half a million copies of tapes and CDs of Round the Horne had been sold by the BBC. Editions of Round the Horne are regularly broadcast on the digital radio service BBC Radio 4 Extra.

=== Scripts ===
Some scripts from all four series have been published. Those printed in two different books listed below are not always identical. Some print the scripts as written and others as finally broadcast. The scripts have been published in five books:

- Took, Barry (1989). The Best of Round the Horne: Fourteen Original and Unexpurgated Scripts. London: Equation. ISBN 978-1-85336-162-3.
- Took, Barry (1998). Round the Horne: The Complete and Utter History. London: Boxtree. ISBN 978-0-7522-2119-9.
- Took, Barry; Coward, Mat (2000). The Best of Round the Horne. London: Boxtree. ISBN 978-0-7522-1809-0.
- Took, Barry; Feldman, Marty (1974). Round the Horne. London: Woburn Press. ISBN 978-0-7130-0121-1.
- Took, Barry; Feldman, Marty (1976). The Bona Book of Julian and Sandy. London: Robson Books. ISBN 978-0-903895-70-5.

==== Series 1 ====
- Programme 1: Took and Coward, 2000
- Programme 4: Took and Feldman, 1974
- Programme 5: Took, 1989; and Took and Coward, 2000
- Programme 7: Took and Coward, 2000
- Programme 12: Took, 1989 (Note: This was a re-recording for the BBC Transcription Services with a slightly altered script.)
- Programme 13: Took, 1989
- Programme 14: Took and Coward, 2000
- Programme 16: Took, 1998

==== Series 2 ====
- Programme 1: Took and Feldman, 1974; and Took and Coward, 2000
- Programme 2: Took, 1998
- Programme 3: Took, 1989
- Programme 4: Took, 1989; and Took and Coward, 2000
- Programme 5: Took and Coward, 2000
- Programme 6: Took and Coward, 2000
- Programme 8: Took and Feldman, 1974
- Programme 9: Took, 1989
- Programme 10: Took, 1989
- Programme 12: Took and Feldman, 1974
- Programme 13: Took, 1989; and Took and Coward, 2000
- 1966 Christmas show: Took and Coward, 2000

==== Series 3 ====
- Programme 1: Took, 1989
- Programme 4: Took, 1989; and Took and Coward, 2000
- Programme 6: Took, 1989
- Programme 7: Took and Feldman, 1974
- Programme 10: Took, 1989; and Took and Coward, 2000
- Programme 11: Took and Feldman, 1974
- Programme 12: Took, 1989
- Programme 13: Took and Coward, 2000
- Programme 14: Took, 1989
- Programme 16: Took and Coward, 2000
- Programme 17: Took, 1998
- Programme 19: Took and Coward, 2000
- Programme 20: Took and Feldman, 1974

==== Series 4 ====
- Programme 4: Took and Coward, 2000
- Programme 5: Took and Coward, 2000
- Programme 8: Took and Coward, 2000
- Programme 12: Took and Coward, 2000
- Programme 14: Took, 1998
- Programme 15: Took and Coward, 2000

The Bona Book of Julian and Sandy by Took and Feldman was published in 1976 and dedicated, "For David Attenborough, who ought to know better". It contains the scripts of thirteen Julian and Sandy sketches:

- Bona Books (from series 2, programme 2)
- Bona Prods (from series 3, programme 10)
- Bona Bijou Tourettes (from series 3, programme 12)
- La Casserole de Bona Gourmet (from series 3, programme 15)
- Bona Hunt (from series 3, programme 14)
- Fabe Homes and Bona Gardens (from series 1, programme 10)
- Bona Tattoos (from series 2, programme 3)
- The Ballet Bona (from series 2, programme 9)
- Bona Grapplers (from series 2, programme 10)
- Bona Law (from series 3, programme 2)
- Bona Pets (from series 2, programme 13)
- Bona Palare (from series 4, programme 13)
- Bona Performers (from series 2, programme 13)

Source: The Bona Book of Julian and Sandy.

=== Spin off ===
Three weeks after the fourth series of Round the Horne finished, the first episode of Horne A'Plenty was broadcast on the ITV channel. In a sketch show format, and with Took as script editor (and later producer), this was an attempt to translate the spirit of Round the Horne to television, although with different actors supporting Horne: Graham Stark, for example, substituted for Williams and Sheila Steafel for Marsden. The first six-part series ran from 22 June to 27 July 1968, the second from 27 November to 1 January 1969.

=== Adaptations ===
==== Round the Horne ... Revisited ====
A stage version, Round the Horne ... Revisited, was adapted from the original radio scripts by Brian Cooke, the last surviving writer of the series, and directed by Michael Kingsbury. It was first produced in October 2003 at the White Bear, a fringe theatre in south London, and opened in the West End at The Venue, Leicester Square in January 2004, running for more than a year. It featured Jonathan Rigby as Horne, Robin Sebastian as Williams, Nigel Harrison as Paddick, Kate Brown as Marsden and Charles Armstrong as Smith. A scene from the show featured in the 2004 Royal Variety Performance at the London Coliseum. Following the success of the London production, a second cast was assembled to tour the provinces. Stephen Critchlow played Horne, with Stephen Matthews, David Rumelle, Felicity Duncan and Oliver Beamish as Williams, Paddick, Marsden and Smith. The original show ran in London until December 2004, when it was replaced by a Christmas edition with an unchanged cast. A third edition, Round the Horne Revisited 2, rounded off the London run from February to April 2005, and then made a provincial tour.

The original version of the stage play was filmed by the BBC; the television director was Nick Wood. The programme was first transmitted on BBC Four on 13 June 2004 and was repeated ten times on Four or BBC Two over the next four years.

==== Other stage versions ====
In 2008 Barry Took's former wife, Lyn, and the director Richard Baron prepared a new stage adaptation, Round the Horne – Unseen and Uncut, which drew entirely on Took and Feldman material from series one to three. It toured in 2008 and 2009. The cast included, from the 2004 show, Rigby as Horne, Sebastian as Williams and Harrison as Paddick (later succeeded by David Delve), with Pertwee's characters – all omitted from the 2004 show – restored, played by Michael Shaw; Stephen Boswell played Smith. Unlike the 2004 production, it had a six-strong cast, augmented by a group of vocalists and musicians in the roles of the Hornblowers and the Fraser Hayes Four.

In 2015, to mark 50 years since the radio series began, Apollo Theatre Company produced a stage adaptation, Round the Horne: The 50th Anniversary Tour, compiled from the original scripts and directed by Tim Astley. The cast comprised Julian Howard McDowell (Horne), Colin Elmer (Williams), Jonathan Hansler (Paddick), Eve Winters (Marsden) and Nick Wymer (Smith).

=== Documentaries ===
A 45-minute BBC radio documentary, Round and Round the Horne, was broadcast on 18 September 1976. It was presented by Frank Bough and included interviews with Williams and Took. A 60-minute radio documentary, Horne A' Plenty, was broadcast on 14 February 1994. It was presented by Leslie Phillips and included new interviews with Marsden and Took and archive material featuring Horne. A three-hour radio special, Horne of Plenty, was broadcast on 5 March 2005 for the 40th anniversary of the show. It was presented by Jonathan James-Moore and included interviews with Ron Moody, Pertwee, Merriman's son Andy, Cooke, Lyn Took, and extracts from Williams's diary read "in character" by David Benson. The special included the first and final episodes of Beyond Our Ken and Round the Horne in their entirety.

=== Contribution to British vocabulary ===
Round the Horne is cited as a source in 38 entries in The Oxford English Dictionary. Rambling Syd is quoted in the entry for "nadger": "In plural. The testicles. 'Now my dearios, I'll tether my nadgers to a grouting pole for the old grey mare is grunging in the meadow' – from a comedy monologue by the character 'Rambling Syd Rumpo' whose material is characterized by the use of nonsense words with a general air of sexual innuendo; the meaning is intentionally vague." Rambling Syd's surname is also cited: "rumpo", "n. Brit. slang. = rumpy-pumpy n. Perhaps influenced by the name of 'Rambling Syd Rumpo', a character (played by Kenneth Williams) in the British radio series Round the Horne (1965–9 [sic]), whose songs, although largely consisting of nonsense words, often had an air of sexual innuendo."

Julian and Sandy are cited among the sources for a range of palare words, including "bona" (Good, excellent; attractive), "naff" (Unfashionable, vulgar; lacking in style, inept; worthless, faulty), "nante" (Nothing), "omee" (Man – spelled "omi" by Took and Feldman) and "palone" (A young woman. Also: an effeminate man).

== Notes and references ==
=== Sources ===
==== Books ====
- Alexander, Richard (1997). Aspects of Verbal Humour in English. Tübingen: Gunter Narr. ISBN 978-3-8233-4936-5.
- Baker, Paul (2004). Fantabulosa: A Dictionary of Polari and Gay Slang. London: Continuum. ISBN 978-0-8264-7343-1.
- Bonner, Frances (2016). Personality Presenters: Television's Intermediaries with Viewers. London: Routledge. ISBN 978-1-138-27949-0.
- Dibbs, Martin (2019). Radio Fun and the BBC Variety Department, 1922–67. London: Springer. ISBN 978-3-319-95609-1.
- Feldman, Marty (2016). Eye Marty: My Life in Words and Pictures. London: Coronet. ISBN 978-1-4447-9273-7.
- Foster, Andy; Furst, Steve (1996). Radio Comedy, 1938–1968: A Guide to 30 Years of Wonderful Wireless. London: Virgin Books. ISBN 978-0-86369-960-3.
- Gilbert, Harriett (1993). The Sexual Imagination from Acker to Zola: a feminist companion. London: Cape. ISBN 978-0-2240-3535-4.
- Hackforth, Norman (1976). Solo for Horne: A Biography of Kenneth Horne. London: Angus & Roberts. ISBN 978-0-207-95650-8.
- Idle, Eric (2018). Always Look on the Bright Side of Life: A Sortabiography. London: Orion. ISBN 978-1-4746-1030-8.
- Johnston, Barry (2006). Round Mr Horne: The Life of Kenneth Horne. London: Aurum Press. ISBN 978-1-84513-123-4.
- Krutnik, Frank; Neale, Steve (2006). Popular Film and Television Comedy. London: Routledge. ISBN 978-1-134-94686-0.
- Lewisohn, Mark (1998). Radio Times Guide to TV Comedy. London: BBC Books. ISBN 978-0-563-36977-6.
- Medhurst, Andy (2007). A National Joke: Popular comedy and English cultural identities. London: Routledge. ISBN 978-0-415-16877-9.
- Morley, Sheridan (2005). Coward. London: Haus. ISBN 978-1-904341-88-8.
- Partridge, Eric (1992). A Dictionary of Catch Phrases, American and British, from the Sixteenth Century to the Present Day. Lanham: Scarborough House. ISBN 978-0-8128-8536-1.
- Partridge, Eric (2016). A Dictionary of the Underworld : British and American. London: Routledge. ISBN 978-1-138-90447-7.
- Ross, Robert (2011). Marty Feldman: the Biography of a Comedy Legend. London: Titan Books. ISBN 978-0-85768-378-6.
- Took, Barry (1981). Laughter in the Air. London: Robson Books and the BBC. ISBN 978-0-563-17197-3.
- Took, Barry (1989). The Best of Round the Horne: Fourteen Original and Unexpurgated Scripts. London: Equation. ISBN 978-1-85336-162-3.
- Took, Barry (1998). Round the Horne: The Complete and Utter History. London: Boxtree. ISBN 978-0-7522-2119-9.
- Took, Barry; Coward, Mat (2000). The Best of Round the Horne. London: Boxtree. ISBN 978-0-7522-1809-0.
- Took, Barry; Feldman, Marty (1974). Round the Horne. London: Woburn Press. ISBN 978-0-7130-0121-1.
- Took, Barry; Feldman, Marty (1976). The Bona Book of Julian and Sandy. London: Robson Books. ISBN 978-0-903895-70-5.

==== Episodes ====
- Round the Horne. Series 1. Episode 6. 11 April 1965. BBC. Light Programme.
- Round the Horne. Series 4. Episode 13. 19 May 1968. BBC. Radio 2.

==== Journals ====
- Bremer, John (1999). "C.S. Lewis and the Ceremonies of Oxford University (1917–1925)". The Lewis Legacy (79).

==== Magazines ====
- Took, Barry (10 July 1974). "Books". Punch. pp. 80–81.

==== Newspapers ====
- Billington, Michael (8 December 2004). "Round the Horne ... Revisited". The Guardian. London. p. 21.
- Cook, William (25 October 2003). "Round The Horne... Revisited". The Guardian. London. (subscription required)
- Cook, William (7 June 2006). "Round Mr Horne, by Barry Johnston". The Independent. London. p. 20.
- Cooke, Brian (12 January 2004). "Return of the gnome clenchers". The Guardian. London.
- Donovan, Paul (6 March 2005). "Radio Waves". The Sunday Times. London. p. Culture 13.
- Gilson, Edwin (30 September 2016). "Gather Round the Horne again as legendary radio show is reconstructed in Sussex". The Argus. Brighton. (subscription required)
- Hall, Duncan (14 November 2008). "Round The Horne – Unseen And Uncut, Theatre Royal". The Argus. Brighton. (subscription required)
- Hall, Julian (5 November 2003). "Round The Horne ... Revisited: White Bear Theatre, London". The Independent. London. p. 17.
- Handley, Malcolm (17 December 2004). "Round the Horne . . . Revisited". The Daily Post. Liverpool. (subscription required)
- Hayward, Hilary (24 June 1967). "The knack of regularly raising a laugh". The Times. London. p. 7.
- Massingberd, Hugh (30 July 2006). "How bona it was to vada Mr Horne's jolly old eek again". The Daily Telegraph. London.
- Morrison, Richard (24 July 1998). "Oh bold, very bold – and wonderful". The Times. London. p. 33. (subscription required)
- Riley, Joe (18 May 2005). "Happy days of Sunday radio and roast beef". The Liverpool Echo. Liverpool.
- Spencer, Charles (24 January 2004). "A treat for anyone with a ticklish gander bag". The Daily Telegraph. London. p. 21. (subscription required)
- Spencer, Charles (3 February 2005). "Exuberant rudery that's a joy forever". The Daily Telegraph. London.
- Thaw, George (20 June 1974). "Books". Daily Mirror. London. p. 23.
- Thomas, Paul (20 October 2009). "One of the funniest evenings – a review of Round the Horne". Bucks Free Press. High Wycombe. (subscription required)
- Vestry, Michael (29 June 2002). "Remembering Barry Took". The Spectator. London. pp. 49–50.
- "Obituary: Mr Kenneth Horne: Witty Radio and TV Entertainer". The Times. 15 February 1969. p. 10. (subscription required)
- "Obituary of Barry Took, Comedian and Writer who Helped to Create Round the Horne and Presented The News Quiz and Points of View". The Daily Telegraph. London. 2 April 2002. p. 25. (subscription required)
- "Off-West End". The Times. London. 2 April 2005. p. 30.
- "Parade of the greats in light entertainment". The Guardian. London. 27 February 1995. p. 20.

==== Websites ====
- "2004, London Coliseum". Royal Variety Performance Archive. Royal Variety Charity.
- "Beyond Our Ken". BBC. 28 October 2014.
- "bona". Oxford English Dictionary (online ed.). Oxford University Press. (Subscription or participating institution membership required.)
- "Desert Island Discs 'greatest radio show of all time'". BBC. 12 February 2019.
- "Horne-a-Plenty". The Radio Times (3657). BBC: 98. 10 February 1994. Archived from the original on 30 July 2018.
- "Horne of Plenty". BBC.
- "nadger". Oxford English Dictionary (online ed.). Oxford University Press. (Subscription or participating institution membership required.)
- "naff". Oxford English Dictionary (online ed.). Oxford University Press. (Subscription or participating institution membership required.)
- "nante". Oxford English Dictionary (online ed.). Oxford University Press. (Subscription or participating institution membership required.)
- Nobody Loves a Fairy When she's Forty. OCLC 498455206.
- "omee". Oxford English Dictionary (online ed.). Oxford University Press. (Subscription or participating institution membership required.)
- "palone". Oxford English Dictionary (online ed.). Oxford University Press. (Subscription or participating institution membership required.)
- "Round and Round the Horne". The Radio Times (2758). BBC: 27. 16 September 1976. Archived from the original on 30 July 2018.
- "Round the Horne". BBC. Archived from the original on 26 October 2018.
- "Round the Horne". The Radio Times (2156). BBC: 19. 4 March 1965. Archived from the original on 7 March 2019.
- "Round the Horne: Special Christmas Edition". The Radio Times (2302). BBC: 30. 21 December 1967. Archived from the original on 7 March 2019.
- "Round the Horne Revisited". BBC Genome. BBC. Archived from the original on 7 March 2019.
- "Round the Horne: The Man with the Golden Thunderball". BBC.
- "Round the Horne: The Three Musketeers". BBC.
- "rumpo". Oxford English Dictionary (online ed.). Oxford University Press. (Subscription or participating institution membership required.)
- "Upright Piano, John Broadwood and Sons, London, 1850. No. 10072". Royal Academy of Music.
- Warnock, Mary (1 September 2017). "Whitehouse [née Hutcheson], (Constance) Mary". Oxford Dictionary of National Biography (online ed.). Oxford University Press. doi:10.1093/ref:odnb/76525. (Subscription, Wikipedia Library access or UK public library membership required.)
