= Fraser Hayes Four =

British vocal group

Publicity poster for Denny Dennis, the group's original backer, and the Fraser Hayes Quartet c1950.

The Fraser Hayes Four, originally called The Fraser Hayes Quartette, was a British close harmony vocal group, formed by the musicians Jimmy Fraser (born James Fraser Potts; 2 February 1922 – 25 September 2001) and Tony Hayes in the late 1940s, disbanded in 1953, and re-formed in 1956. The four original members were Jimmy Fraser (Potts), Tony Hayes, Dave Mason and June Ellis/Kerry Sims. The group split for good in late 1969. They are best known for providing musical interludes on the BBC Radio comedy programmes Beyond Our Ken and Round the Horne.

== Career ==
Tony Hayes originally studied art, and Jimmy Fraser engineering. They each dropped their original careers to become dance band guitarists.

Around 1949, the popular 1930s and 1940s singer Denny Dennis teamed up with the original Fraser Hayes Quartette (who were to eventually become the Fraser Hayes Four). Dennis initially financed the venture, and the new group was to prove successful. In June 1950, they appeared on the BBC Radio show Variety Fanfare, and were given positive comments by the critics. However, in January 1951, Dennis withdrew, possibly in part due to the financial pressures of maintaining such a group.

They disbanded in 1953, but re-formed in 1956. Fraser and Hayes remained constant for the life of the group, but the female lead and the fourth (bass) voice changed periodically. Annabelle Lee replaced June Ellis and married Jimmy Fraser. Dave Mason left the group and was replaced by Nick Welsh. Later, they had a new female vocalist, Lynda Russell. She was herself replaced by Kerri Sims, who was followed by Barbara Moore. Lee then later rejoined the group. Canadian Harry Currie became the fourth male voice in 1962, appearing with the group during their six-week headlining engagement at London's Latin Quarter cabaret club and on several BBC broadcasts. In the 1960s, Marjorie Daw was part of the group.

They are perhaps best known for providing musical interludes on the BBC Radio comedy programmes Beyond Our Ken and Round the Horne in the 1960s. In the shows, the female singer is occasionally referred to comedically by the fictitious name 'Marj' (e.g. the line "Hear no evil, See no evil, Speak no evil and Marj" in the episode "The Three Musketeers").

The group disbanded when the shows ended after the death of Kenneth Horne in 1969.

Jimmy Fraser eventually emigrated to the United States to pursue a solo career there. Jimmy Fraser was often a guest at George Mitchell's house in Kissimmee Florida (famous for The Black & White Minstrel Show). Colin Tongs, a British property developer living in Florida, also invited Petula Clark and her husband to weekend jam sessions. Tony Hayes formed a new vocal harmony group named The Skyliners after the Fraser Hayes Four split up. Fraser, originally from Sunderland, died in 2001, aged 79. He was a resident of Jupiter, Florida.

== Discography ==
- The Fraser Hayes Four, Spin, Spin, Spin, Rainbow Records, 1957
- The Fraser Hayes Four, 4 By 4 EP, Pye, 1959
  - A1: "I'm Glad There Is You"
  - A2: "Spring Is Here"
  - B1: "How Can I Tell Her"
  - B2: "Darn That Dream"
