= Douglas Smith (broadcaster) =

British radio actor and announcer

- Born: Douglas Arthur Smith; 11 February 1924
- Died: 15 October 1972 (aged 48); Kingston upon Thames
- Occupations: Radio announcer; Newsreader; Actor
- Employer: BBC
- Notable work: Beyond Our Ken; Round the Horne

Douglas Arthur Smith (11 February 1924 – 15 October 1972) was a British radio announcer and comedian who spent 25 years with the BBC. He began his broadcasting career with the BBC European Service (now the World Service) in 1946 and later worked as an announcer and newsreader on the Home Service and the Third Programme. He was also involved in designing television show sets. He's credited as the Designer on a 1956 episode of the BBC series Nom-de-Plume, 'Free to Air' .

He is probably best remembered as the formal announcer on Beyond Our Ken (1958–1964), its successor Round the Horne (1965–1968) and the short-lived Stop Messing About (1969–1970), where his "BBC accent" was used to comic effect. In this role, he advertised Dobbiroids (a fictional product for horses) and the huge number of naïve sound effects he made to assist in the development of humorous and often bizarre plots. Smith performed "Nobody Loves a Fairy When She's Forty" in an episode of Round the Horne. Many of his roles were portrayals of inanimate objects, e.g., volcanoes, "and I, Douglas Smith, play the part of the volcano", and "I, Douglas Smith, in my most taxing role to date, play the part of the world." (spoof on Around the World in 80 Days).

A Croydonian, he died aged 48 in Kingston upon Thames.
