= Peter Eldin =

British author and magician

Peter Eldin (born 1939) is a British author and magician. He has written almost two hundred books; most of them are non-fiction for young people. According to WorldCat there are "132 works in 188 publications in 12 languages and 8,912 library holdings." He writes mainly on factual material, fun (puzzles, quizzes, jokes, and games) and magic for children, and has also edited magic magazines The Magic Circular and Abracadabra, and written scripts for TV shows including The Weakest Link.

== Books for children ==
He is best known for the series of humorous instructional books for children such as The Trickster's Handbook (1976), The Secret Agent's Handbook (1977) and The Whizzkid's Handbook (1979), full of tricks, games, puzzles, and advice, with illustrations by Roger Smith. The following gives a brief flavour of these works: "tell your friends you can kiss a book 'inside and outside' without opening it - then prove it by kissing the book while standing outdoors ... and then indoors. Something semiserious? Baffle your buddies with vanishing water or instant indoor rainbows." The series was adapted for television in 1980 as The Whizzkids Guide starring Kenneth Williams, Rita Webb and Arthur Mullard as overgrown schoolchildren. Williams said "the script is full of corny gags which actually make me laugh".

School Library Journal called The Magic Handbook "an excellent standard source for magical tricks and advice for most children's library collections for many years to come." His book Magic (1998) has also received praise as an informative history of magic. The Spookster's Handbook (CIP Sterling, 1989) is "an entertaining little gem that's chock-full of zany ideas for Halloween", including haunted house ideas, optical illusions, tricks, and riddles, aimed at kids, parents, teachers, and group leaders.

== Magic ==
In addition to writing several books on magic (illusionism), he is also an honorary member of the magicians' organisation the Magic Circle. He was involved in curating the Magic Circle's museum in the 1970s and edited the Circle's magazine The Magic Circular from 1990 to 1998.
