= Denny Dennis =

British singer (1913–1993)

Publicity flyer for Denny Dennis c. 1950

Denny Dennis (born Ronald Dennis Pountain; 1 November 1913 – 2 November 1993) was a British romantic vocalist during the 1930s to the 1950s, singing with British dance bands when they were at the peak of their popularity. He was a dance band singer, a solo recording star and a broadcaster.

== Career ==
Born Ronald Dennis Pountain, in Derby, he had a job on the railways as a teenager. He was spotted by Percy Mathison Brooks, the editor of the Melody Maker, at a regional dance band contest in 1932. In time, this led to Dennis working with the Freddy Bretherton Band at the Spider's Web Roadhouse Club on the Watford bypass.

In 1933, Dennis became a featured singer in the Roy Fox band, for five years until the Fox band disbanded. He worked with Ambrose's orchestra for six months, until June 1939, when he decided to go solo, recording for Decca's Rex label. This soon clashed with the outbreak of the Second World War, and Dennis enlisted in the RAF in June 1940 and remained in uniform until 1945.

After the war, he made a number of recordings with Stanley Black and his orchestra and these drew him to the attention of Tommy Dorsey. In March 1948, Dennis left the UK to become the featured vocalist with the Tommy Dorsey Orchestra. He had a successful time with Dorsey with their recording of "Down by the Station" reaching the Billboard charts in 1949 and peaking in the number 11 position. In April 1949, he decided to return to England for personal reasons.

In 1950, he sponsored a close harmony singing group, the Fraser Hayes Four, who had success on radio in the 1960s. As the dance band scene declined, he found work making covers of popular songs for the budget Embassy label.

== Personal life and death ==
Dennis married Betty Faye in 1938. They had one son, but the marriage was later dissolved.

He married again, to Joan Armitage in 1969; this marriage was dissolved in 1981.

Denny Dennis died in Barrow-in-Furness in November 1993, the day after his 80th birthday.
