= Robin Sebastian =

English actor

Robin Sebastian (born 1965) is an English actor, known for his portrayals of Kenneth Williams, an English actor and comedian.

A native of London, he has played Williams in recreations of Round the Horne and Hancock's Half Hour on stage, screen and radio.

== Personal life ==
Raised in Headley, Surrey, Sebastian was educated at Highfield Prep School in Liphook, The King's School, Canterbury, the University of Manchester (reading History of Art) and the Arts Educational Schools Acting Company.

He lives with his wife Lucy in West London.

== Theatre credits ==
- as Kenneth Williams in The Missing Hancocks, Assembly Rooms Edinburgh
- as Willy Bambury in Fallen Angels, UK tour
- as Robin Craigie in Volcano, Vaudeville Theatre London and UK tour
- as Kenneth Williams in Stop Messing About, Leicester Square Theatre London and UK tour
- as Kenneth Williams in Round The Horne - Unseen and Uncut, Theatre Royal Brighton and UK tour
- as Lt. Gruber in 'Allo 'Allo, UK tour
- as Carmen Ghia in The Producers, UK tour and West End
- as Cardinal Richelieu in The Three Musketeers, Bristol Old Vic
- as Willy Bambury in Fallen Angels, Vienna's English Theatre
- as Kenneth Williams in Round the Horne ... Revisited, West End and UK tour
- as Cecil Graham in Lady Windermere's Fan, Vienna's English Theatre
- as Algernon in The Importance of Being Earnest, Torch Theatre Milford Haven

== Radio credits ==
- as Kenneth Williams in The Missing Hancocks, Radio 4
- as Kenneth Williams in Twice Ken is Plenty, Radio 4

== Television credits ==
- as Kenneth Williams in The Lost Sitcoms: Hancock's Half Hour, BBC4
- as James Ferman in Holy Flying Circus, Hillbilly Productions, BBC4
- as jewellery clerk in Catastrophe, Avalon Productions, Channel 4
- as arrogant husband in Sherlock Series 2, Hartswood, BBC1
- as Kenneth Williams in Round the Horne ... Revisited, FictionLab, BBC4
- as Narrator in Yours Faithfully Edna Welthorpe (Mrs) Polkadot Productions, University Of Leicester
- as Kenneth Williams in Babs, BBC1
