= Beyond Our Ken =

BBC radio sketch comedy show

- Genre: Sketch comedy
- Running time: 30 minutes
- Country of origin: United Kingdom
- Language: English
- Home station: BBC Light Programme
- Starring: Kenneth Horne; Kenneth Williams; Hugh Paddick; Betty Marsden; Bill Pertwee
- Announcer: Douglas Smith
- Written by: Eric Merriman; Barry Took (s 1–2)
- Produced by: Jacques Brown (s 1–5); John Simmonds (s 6–7); Charles Maxwell (s 1)
- Original release: 1 July 1958 – 16 February 1964
- No. of series: 7 (+ 2 Christmas specials)
- No. of episodes: 123

Beyond Our Ken is a BBC radio comedy programme first broadcast between 1958 and 1964. It starred Kenneth Horne, with Kenneth Williams, Hugh Paddick, Betty Marsden, Bill Pertwee, and, as announcer, Douglas Smith. The title is a play on the name Kenneth and the familiar expression "beyond our ken" (ken being a mainly Northern English and Scots word meaning 'knowledge or perception').

The show ran for seven series, and a total of 121 shows. The scripts were by Eric Merriman, with Barry Took as co-writer in the first two series. Musical accompaniment was provided by the BBC Revue Orchestra, with musical interludes mostly by the Fraser Hayes Four.

When the show finished it was replaced by the series Round the Horne (1965–1968), which built on, and exceeded, the success of the earlier show.

== Background ==
Eric Merriman had written some material for Barry Took, when the latter was an aspiring stand-up comic. They subsequently collaborated in writing material for Kenneth Horne for BBC radio shows, and in June 1957 the BBC producer Jacques Brown asked Merriman to devise a thirty-minute show with Horne as the star. The proposal was for a series depicting a fictional week in Horne's life. The original working title was Don't Look Now, but a senior official in the BBC's Variety department thought the title weak, and Took was asked to suggest some alternatives. His own preferred title was Round the Horne, and Merriman favoured Hornerama, but from Took's list the BBC chose Beyond Our Ken, and it was under that title that Merriman and Took completed the script for the pilot show.

For the supporting cast it was agreed that the show required a strong team of versatile comedy actors who could play a wide range of parts. They were drawn from the West End and BBC radio and television. From revue (Note: By the time of the first series, Moody, Paddick and Lancaster were appearing in the revue For Adults Only, which ran at the Strand Theatre for 292 performances from 25 June 1958. Took, who had not yet abandoned his stage career, was a member of the cast.) the show featured the actors Ron Moody and Hugh Paddick and the singer Pat Lancaster; from BBC television, Betty Marsden; and from radio Kenneth Williams.

== Production history ==
The pilot was recorded on 2 October 1957. It was well received by the studio audience and the BBC agreed to go ahead with a series. The project was put on hold in February 1958 after Horne suffered a stroke that left him partially paralysed. He made an almost complete recovery – left with only a slight limp – and was able to return to broadcasting. There followed seven series of the show, beginning in July 1958 and ending in February 1964. Moody left after the first series, concluding that he was less suited than his colleagues to radio performance. His replacement was Bill Pertwee, whom Horne had encountered in Pertwee's early days as a performer, and whose versatility impressed him. After the second series, Merriman and Took fell out, and the former rejected Horne's plea that Took should be invited to contribute material to future shows. Merriman insisted on being recognised as the sole writer for the duration of the show.

=== Series ===
Series	Start date	Episodes	Script	Cast	Music	Producer
1	1 July 1958	21 and a Christmas special	Eric Merriman and Barry Took	Kenneth Horne, Kenneth Williams, Hugh Paddick, Betty Marsden, Ron Moody, Stanley Unwin (episodes 1 and 8). Announcer: Douglas Smith	Pat Lancaster, Malcolm Mitchell Trio (progs 1–16) Fraser Hayes Four (from episode 17), BBC Revue Orchestra, cond. Harry Rabinowitz and Paul Fenoulhet	Jacques Brown; Charles Maxwell (episodes 20 and 21 only)
2	19 March 1959	20 and a Christmas special	Merriman, Took	Horne, Williams, Paddick, Marsden, Bill Pertwee, Smith	Lancaster, Fraser Hayes Four, BBC Revue Orchestra, Edwin Braden	Brown
3	19 April 1960	14	Merriman	Horne, Williams, Paddick, Marsden, Pertwee, Smith	Lancaster, Janet Waters, Fraser Hayes Four, the Hornets, BBC Revue Orchestra, Braden	Brown
4	20 October 1960	20	Merriman	Horne, Williams, Paddick, Marsden, Pertwee, Smith	Waters, June Brown (episode 16), Fraser Hayes Four, the Hornets, BBC Revue Orchestra, Braden	Brown
5	12 October 1961	20	Merriman	Horne, Williams, Paddick, Marsden, Pertwee, Smith	Jill Day, Fraser Hayes Four, BBC Revue Orchestra, Braden	Brown
6	27 December 1962	12	Merriman	Horne, Williams, Paddick, Marsden, Pertwee, Smith	Eileen Gourlay, Fraser Hayes Four, BBC Revue Orchestra, Braden	John Simmonds
7	24 November 1963	13	Merriman	Horne, Williams, Paddick, Marsden, Pertwee, Smith	Gourlay, Fraser Hayes Four, BBC Revue Orchestra, Braden	Simmonds

In 1964 Merriman quarrelled with the BBC and refused to go on writing Beyond Our Ken. The BBC proposed to continue without him, keeping Horne and the team together in a show provisionally titled It's Ken Again, to be written by Took and his new writing partner, Marty Feldman. In the face of Merriman's furious objections, the new series went ahead, with the title changed to Round the Horne. Merriman was further embittered when the new show surpassed the popularity and reputation of Beyond Our Ken and he never forgave Took. Horne's biographer Barry Johnston comments "If Kenneth Horne had retired from broadcasting after the final episode of Beyond Our Ken, he would still have been remembered as the star of two of the most successful radio comedy series ever. (Note: Before Beyond Our Ken, Horne had co-starred in and co-written Much-Binding-in-the-Marsh.) His place as one of the all-time greats of British comedy, however, is due to the extraordinary popularity of Round the Horne." Nevertheless, in the words of the BBC, "While Beyond Our Ken might have been outshone by its successor, it shared much of the same DNA that made Round the Horne one of the greats".

== Format ==
Like ITMA and Much-Binding-in-the-Marsh before it, Beyond Our Ken interspersed comic sections with musical interludes, but it differed from them and all its other predecessors in the way the show opened each week. Instead of an opening signature tune, the programme began with a short sketch of a few lines, usually based on a punning reference to a film title (for instance a man running a flea circus for more than six years was the key to The Seven Year Itch). After that the announcer, Douglas Smith, would welcome listeners and introduce the fictional guests appearing that week, such as "General Sir Gertrude Fanshawe, Marion Haste, The House of Lords Banjo Octet, Dizzy Barbirolli, and of course Mr Kenneth Horne, who prefers to remain anonymous".

== Characters ==
Beyond Our Ken featured regular characters including Ambrose and Felicity (described by Took as "a pair of doddering old idiots"), played by Williams and Marsden. Another – unnamed – ancient personage, played by Williams, had been doing whatever he was doing on each programme for "thirty-five years"; Stanley Birkinshaw (Paddick) was a man with ill-fitting false teeth speaking with distorted sibilants and spraying saliva in all directions. Another regular was the supposed BBC commentator Cecil Snaith, played by Paddick and written not by Merriman or Took but by Horne; Snaith's commentaries were invariably struck by disaster and ended, "And with that, I return you to the studio". Two regulars who always appeared together were the men-about-town Rodney (Williams) and Charles (Paddick), variously described as "jolly decent public school chaps", "frightfully correct", "a pair of effete young men", and "two frightfully, frightfully Mayfair types, doing ridiculous things together like dressing up as red Indians when they took a canoeing holiday".

== Recordings ==
As at May 2020 the BBC had licensed the release of the first four series of Beyond Our Ken on commercially available CD. In 2021 the BBC released two audiobook collections, the first containing all remaining episodes of Series 1-4, the second containing all episodes from Series 5-7. Several episodes are missing from the BBC archives. Series 1 is missing 9 episodes out of a total of 22. Series 2 is missing 7 episodes out of a total of 21. Series 4 is missing 1 episode out of a total of 20 episodes. (Note: Episodes missing from the BBC archives: Series 1: Episodes 6, 10-13, 17, 21 and 22; Series 2: Episodes 1, 4, 7, 9, 15, 16 and 19; Series 4: Episode 12.)

== Notes, references and sources ==
=== Sources ===
- Freedland, Michael (1990). Kenneth Williams: A Biography. London: Weidenfeld and Nicolson. ISBN 978-0-297-79701-2.
- Gaye, Freda, ed. (1967). Who's Who in the Theatre (fourteenth ed.). London: Sir Isaac Pitman and Sons. OCLC 5997224.
- Gifford, Denis (1985). The Golden Age of Radio: An Illustrated Companion. London: Batsford. ISBN 978-0-7134-4234-2.
- Hackforth, Norman (1976). Solo for Horne: A Biography of Kenneth Horne. London: Angus & Roberts. ISBN 978-0-207-95650-8.
- Johnston, Barry (2006). Round Mr Horne: The Life of Kenneth Horne. London: Aurum Press. ISBN 978-1-84513-123-4.
- Took, Barry (1981). Laughter in the Air. London: Robson Books and the BBC. ISBN 978-0-563-17197-3.
