= Betty Marsden =

British actor and comedian (1919–1998)

- In Carry On Camping (1969)
- Born: Betty Marsden; 24 February 1919; West Derby, Lancashire, England
- Died: 18 July 1998 (aged 79); Northwood, Middlesex, England
- Education: Italia Conti Academy of Theatre Arts
- Occupation: actress
- Years active: 1937–1994
- Spouse(s): James Wilson Muggoch (1945–1975)

Betty Marsden (24 February 1919 – 18 July 1998) was an English comedy actress. She is particularly remembered as a cast member of the radio series Beyond Our Ken and Round the Horne. Marsden appeared in two Carry On films, Carry On Regardless (1961) and Carry On Camping (1969).

== Early life ==
Marsden was born in West Derby, Liverpool, and grew up in near poverty in Somerset. Her music teacher recognised her talent at the age of six, and became her guardian. She attended the Italia Conti Academy of Theatre Arts and during the Second World War she entertained the troops as a member of ENSA.

== Career ==
From 1958 to 1968, Marsden was a cast member of the radio series Beyond Our Ken and Round the Horne, where she played most of the female characters. Perhaps her most famous catchphrase was "many, many, many times", delivered in the dry, reedy tones of Bea Clissold, the ancient actress who was renowned for having given pleasure to many, particularly in "The Little Hut" on Shaftesbury Avenue. This long outlasted the Clissold character and was deployed to much audience appreciation on a few occasions in later series, possibly as an ad lib. Another was " 'allo, cheeky face!", shouted into the microphone in the less-than-couth London tones of Buttercup Gruntfuttock. Marsden's vocal range was impressive and also included the husky Daphne Whitethigh, the strident stereotypical Aussie tones of the ultra feminist (but conflicted) Judy Coolibar, and the cut-glass Received Pronunciation of Dame Celia Molestrangler (in a series of loose pastiches of the stilted dialogue in 1930s and 1940s romances and melodramas – for example, The Astonished Heart became The Hasty Nose, and Brief Encounter became Brief Ecstasy – partnered with Hugh Paddick's 'ageing juvenile Binkie Huckaback', with the denouement inevitably bringing the lovers crashing back to earth).

In 1958, Marsden played the Fairy Godmother, in Rodgers and Hammerstein's Cinderella at the London Coliseum with Tommy Steele, Kenneth Williams, Yana and Jimmy Edwards.

Her two Carry On films were Carry On Regardless (1961), as Mata Hari, and Carry On Camping (1969), as Terry Scott's wife Harriet, with a braying laugh and jolly bossiness.

Her other film roles included Ramsbottom Rides Again (1956), The Big Day (1960), The Boys (1962), The Wild Affair (1964), The Leather Boys (1964), The Best House in London (1969), and Eyewitness (1970). She later played Hermione in Britannia Hospital (1982), Violet Manning in The Dresser (1983), Princess Troubetskaya in Anastasia: The Mystery of Anna (1986 TV movie), and Mrs. Barnacle in Little Dorrit (1987).

Her theatre roles included Mrs. Prentice in What the Butler Saw at the Royal Court Theatre in 1975, and Mrs. Hardcastle in She Stoops to Conquer at the Lyric Theatre, Hammersmith, in 1982. Her role of Aunt Dahlia was removed from Andrew Lloyd Webber's flop musical Jeeves (1975) before opening night.

Her television appearances included Blake's 7 (Series 4, 1981), The Bill (Series 5, 1989) and Inspector Morse (1990).

== Personal life and death ==
During the Second World War, Marsden met and married Dr Jimmy Wilson Muggoch, an army doctor from Edinburgh. From 1963 the couple lived in Brentford on their houseboat Chilham, a converted Thames lighter.

Prior to her death, Marsden had been suffering from heart problems and pneumonia. She was believed to be recovering, but died suddenly while socialising with friends in the bar of Denville Hall, a retirement home for actors, in Northwood in London.
