= Norman Hackforth =

British musician (1908–1996)

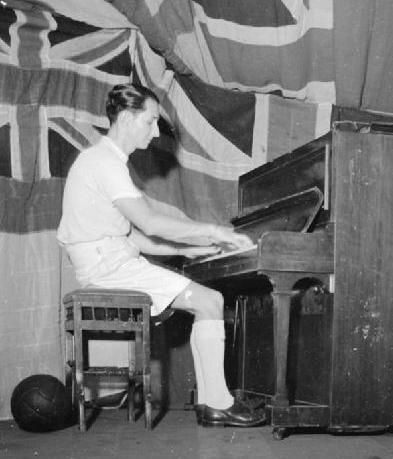
- Hackforth performing for sailors aboard HMS Victorious in Ceylon, August 1944
- Born: December 20, 1908; Bihar, British India
- Died: December 14, 1996 (aged 87); Wittersham, United Kingdom
- Education: Aldenham School
- Occupations: Musician and radio broadcaster
- Years active: 1952-1987
- Employers: BBC; Radio Luxembourg; Anglia Television
- Notable credits: Twenty Questions; Between Ourselves; After the Ball
- Spouse: Pamela Mary Hall (m. 1949; died 1995)

Norman Hackforth (20 December 1908 – 14 December 1996) was a British musician and radio broadcaster, who worked as accompanist to Noël Coward and gained fame as the "mystery voice" on the BBC's Twenty Questions radio programme.

== Life and career ==
=== Early years ===
Born in Bihar in British India in 1908, son of a railway engineer, Hackforth was sent to England at the age of six, and was raised by four aunts. After his schooling, at Aldenham School, he intended to begin medical studies, but failed the preliminary examinations. He found himself drawn to music. He was never a fluent sight-reader of a musical score and as a performer he had to overcome what he called "this awful barrier".

Hackforth's first job was as nightclub pianist in Soho, and in the late 1920s and throughout the 1930s that was his principal occupation, working at a range of clubs. He had a sideline in songwriting, while working for the Dix Music Company. His compositions 'Today's A Sunny Day For Me' and 'Cute Little Flat' enjoyed modest success. He also accompanied music hall and other singers of popular songs, both on stage and in the recording studio – the latter, principally for the Piccadilly label. In the words of his obituarist in The Times, he appeared "with the Whispering Lunatics at the London Pavilion, and accompanying Fannie Ward (the suggestively clad 'Flapper Granny') as she titillated the patrons of the Willesden Empire". He also provided the voice for advertisements on Radio Luxembourg and performed on early television broadcasts in the UK. During the late 1920s and early 1930s he was occasionally seen acting on both television and cinema screens.

At the start of the Second World War, Hackforth volunteered for military service, but was turned down on medical grounds. He joined Entertainments National Service Association (ENSA), which provided entertainment for the troops. With ENSA he toured France, in the early days of the war, and then North Africa. In 1941 he worked briefly as an assistant and arranger for an ENSA colleague, Noël Coward, and on meeting him again in Egypt in 1943 was recruited to work as Coward's accompanist and assistant on a charitable fund-raising tour of South Africa. The two continued to India, where Coward performed for military audiences. They made a number of recordings together while in Calcutta, mostly of Coward's songs, but also "Music Hath Charms" by Hackforth.

=== Postwar and later years ===
After the war, Hackforth continued as an accompanist, for Coward and other performers including Beatrice Lillie. In 1946 he wrote the music for a revue, Between Ourselves, with lyrics and sketches by Eric Maschwitz. The Manchester Guardian thought the comedy shrill and Hackforth's music "agreeable but not in the least memorable. In sum a passable but rather insipid evening." The Times expressed a similar lack of enthusiasm. The show ran for three months, and closed on 15 March 1947.

In 1947, Hackforth was recruited for a new radio panel show, Twenty Questions, a BBC adaptation of a successful American format. A panel of contestants would attempt to deduce the identity of an object by asking a series of questions; Hackforth, as the "mystery voice", would announce the answer to listeners before they began. The show was a great success, turning Hackforth into an immediately recognisable figure. For many years he continued as the mystery voice, until Richard Dimbleby left the panel in 1965, when Hackforth changed roles and became a panellist.

Hackforth worked again with Coward on the unsuccessful After the Ball (1954). Coward was not a trained musician, and Hackforth flew to his home in to Jamaica to help him finish the score in late 1953. Coward appointed Hackforth musical director of the show, but inadvertently sabotaged him by casting in the leading role a singer well past her prime. Before opening in London, the show had a twelve-week provincial tour during which Hackforth reluctantly cut the most vocally challenging music from the score. When Coward saw the production in Bristol he was distressed by the singing, but also found that "The orchestra was appalling, the orchestrations beneath contempt, and poor Norman conducted like a stick of wet asparagus." Hackforth was relieved of his duties as musical director, but Coward still wished to work with him. He was intended to accompany Coward on his 1955 Las Vegas performances, but was unable to get an American work permit, and was replaced by Peter Matz.

Hackforth later became the musical director of Anglia Television, before retiring in the 1970s and publishing an autobiography, And the Next Object ..., in 1975. The following year he published Solo for Horne, a biography of his old Twenty Questions colleague, Kenneth Horne.

Hackforth died aged 87 at his home in Wittersham, Kent, on 14 December 1996. His wife, Pamela, whom he married in 1949, had died the previous year.
