= Hugh Paddick =

Comedy actor (1915–2000)

- Paddick in a Round the Horne publicity shot
- Born: Hugh William Paddick; 22 August 1915; Hoddesdon, Hertfordshire, England
- Died: 9 November 2000 (aged 85); Milton Keynes, Buckinghamshire, England
- Occupation: Comedy actor

Hugh William Paddick (22 August 1915 – 9 November 2000) was an English actor. He starred in the 1960s BBC radio show Round the Horne, performing in sketches such as "Charles and Fiona" (as Charles) and "Julian and Sandy" (as Julian). He and Kenneth Williams were largely responsible for introducing the underground language Polari to the British public.

Paddick also enjoyed success as Percival Browne in the original West End production of The Boy Friend, in 1954.

== Biography ==
Born in Hoddesdon, Hertfordshire, Paddick preferred theatre to any other form of acting and spent most of his life on the stage, from his first role at acting school in 1937 until his retirement. He appeared in the original Drury Lane production of My Fair Lady as Colonel Pickering. He was an accomplished musician – singer, pianist and organist. He can be heard at the piano accompanying Julian and Sandy in several of their sketches on both Round the Horne and The Bona World of Julian and Sandy.

In his diaries, Kenneth Williams, so often scathing of his colleagues, spoke warmly of Paddick's kindness as a man, and of his "subtlety and brilliance" as a performer.

Paddick was gay and lived for over thirty years with his partner Francis, whom he met at a party in London. Paddick was very guarded about his privacy. He and his partner were keen gardeners at their home in Bedfordshire.

He was distantly related to Brian Paddick, now Lord Paddick, Britain's first openly gay police commander.

Paddick died in Milton Keynes, Buckinghamshire, on 9 November 2000, aged 85.

=== In popular culture ===
In the 2006 BBC television film Kenneth Williams: Fantabulosa!, about the life of Williams, Paddick was portrayed by Guy Henry.

== Films ==
- School for Scoundrels (1960) – Instructor
- We Shall See (1964) – Connell
- San Ferry Ann (1965) – French Commercial Traveller
- The Killing of Sister George (1968) – Freddie
- Up Pompeii (1971) – Priest
- Up the Chastity Belt (1971) – Robin Hood
- That's Your Funeral (1972) – Window Dresser

== Television ==
- Here and Now (1956)
- The Two Charleys (1959) – Lionel Stone
- Gert and Daisy (1959) – Boris
- The Larkins (1963–1964) – Osbert Rigby-Soames
- The Strange World of Gurney Slade (episode 2, 1960) – Fairy
- Winning Widows (1961–1962)
- Worm's Eye View (play) (1962) see IMDB reference below
- Benny Hill (1963)
- Frankie Howerd (1965–1966)
- Pure Gingold (1965)
- The Wednesday Play episode: The End of Arthur's Marriage (1965) – House Agent
- Before the Fringe (1967)
- Beryl Reid Says Good Evening (1968) – Various Roles
- Comedy Playhouse (1968–1972) – Bernard Hooper / Sidney Jelliot
- The Jimmy Tarbuck Show (1968)
- Wink to Me Only (1969) – Sydney Jelliot
- Here Come the Double Deckers episode: Summer Camp (1970) – Gerald
- Father, Dear Father episode: Housie – Housie (1971), episode: Flat Spin (1973) – Mr. Nash / Fanshawe
- The Marty Feldman Comedy Machine (1971) – Various Characters
- The Benny Hill Show series 4, episode 1 (1972)
- Pardon My Genie (1972, children's comedy series) – The Genie
- Tell Tarby (1973)
- PG Tips advertisement (1976) (provided the voice of a chimpanzee)
- Sykes episode: Television Film (1978) – Nigel Lambshank
- The Basil Brush Show (1979)
- Can We Get On Now, Please? (1980) – Charles Pettigrew
- The Morecambe and Wise Show (1980) – Adrian Fondle / Robin Caress
- Rushton's Illustrated (1980)
- The Jim Davidson Show (1980–1981)
- Babble (1983)
- Jemima Shore Investigates episode: The Crime of the Dancing Duchess (1983) – Tony Jerrold
- Blackadder series 3 episode 4: Sense and Senility (1987) – David Keanrick, thespian
- Alas Smith and Jones episode 4.5 (1987)
- And There's More episode 4.1 (1988) – Various Characters
- Boon episode: Never Say Trevor Again (1988) – Don Pettifer
- Campion (1990) – 'Beaut' Siegfried
- Jackson Pace: The Great Years (1990) – Lord Taggon (Last appearance)

== Theatre ==
- Noah (1937) Embassy School of Acting
- There's Always Tomorrow (1949) New Wimbledon Theatre
- The Thunderbolt (1952) Liverpool Playhouse
- The Two Bouquets (1953) St Martin's Theatre
- The Boy Friend (1953) Embassy Theatre, (1954) Wyndham's Theatre
- The Impresario From Smyrna (1954) Arts Theatre
- For Amusement Only (1956) Apollo Theatre
- She Smiled at Me (1956) Connaught Theatre
- For Adults Only (1958) various theatres
- My Fair Lady (1959–1961) Theatre Royal, Drury Lane
- See You Inside (1963) Duchess Theatre
- Let's Get A Divorce! (1966–1967) Mermaid Theatre
- The Madwoman of Chaillot (1967) Oxford Playhouse
- They Don't Grow on Trees (1968) Prince of Wales Theatre
- Antony and Cleopatra (1969) Chichester Festival Theatre
- When We Are Married (1971) Strand Theatre
- Cinderella (1974) Casino Theatre
- Play by Play (1975) The King's Head Theatre, Islington
- Beauty and the Beast (1975) Oxford Playhouse
- Some of My Best Friends are Husbands (1976) Mermaid Theatre, (1983) Watford Palace
- Out on a Limb (1976) Vaudeville Theatre
- Volpone (1977) Royal National Theatre
- Half Life (1977–1978) Duke of York's Theatre
- Gigi (1980) Haymarket Theatre (Leicester)
- Soldier's Fortune (1981) Lyric Hammersmith
- Venice Preserv'd (1984) Lyttelton Theatre
- Wild Honey (1984) Lyttelton Theatre
- Noises Off (1985) Savoy Theatre

== Radio ==
- Beyond Our Ken (1958–1964)
- Gert and Daisy (1959)
- The Men from the Ministry (1965)
- Round the Horne (1965–1968)
- Stop Messing About (1969)
- Share and Share Alike (1978)
- A Chaste Maid in Cheapside (play) (1979)
- Just Before Midnight (1979)
- The 27-Year Itch (1979)
- I Love The 27-Year Itch (play) (1980)
