= Variety Playhouse (BBC) =

Variety Playhouse is a radio programme on the BBC Home Service during the 1950s and early 1960s.

It was broadcast live each week except during the summer. Often it played on Saturday between 8 and 9 p.m., but it could also be found at other times and on other days. There was a live audience, live chorus and live orchestra. Frequently the compère was the comedian/violinist Vic Oliver; he sometimes doubled as conductor.

Regular features included a comedian and an up-and-coming opera singer.

The final feature often was "Variety Playhouse Pocket Theatre", starring Jack Hulbert and Cicely Courtneidge in a short, specially written play.

The show often played out to the "Russian Dance" (Trépak) from The Nutcracker Suite. Besides providing a rousing ending, this helped to smooth out any deviations from the planned length in the timing of this live show.

The programme was first advertised for Saturday 2 May 1953. It was last advertised for Saturday 19 May 1962.

In The Times of 21 August 1964, Adrian Boult paid tribute to Vic Oliver following Oliver's death the previous week. He wrote of Oliver's "hard and often thankless work" in auditioning young and unknown musicians for the opportunity to broadcast for the first time in Variety Playhouse. He wrote that almost every programme had at least one unknown name on it.
