= Kenneth Williams =

British actor and comedian (1926–1988)

- Publicity photo of Williams in the early 1960s
- Born: Kenneth Charles Williams; 22 February 1926; King's Cross, London, England
- Died: 15 April 1988 (aged 62); Bloomsbury, London, England
- Occupations: Actor; comedian
- Years active: 1945–1988
- Known for: Carry On films Just a Minute; Hancock's Half Hour; Beyond Our Ken; Round the Horne

Kenneth Charles Williams (22 February 1926 – 15 April 1988) was a British actor and comedian. He was best known for his comedy roles and in later life as a raconteur and diarist. He was one of the main cast in 26 of the 31 Carry On films and appeared in many British television programmes and radio comedies, including series with Tony Hancock and Kenneth Horne, as well as being a frequent panellist on BBC Radio 4's comedy panel show Just a Minute from its second series in 1968 until his death 20 years later.

Williams grew up in Central London in a working-class family; he said his father spoke Cockney. He served in the Royal Engineers during the Second World War, in which he first became interested in becoming an entertainer. After a short spell in repertory theatre as a serious actor, he turned to comedy and achieved national fame in Hancock's Half Hour. He sustained continued success throughout the 1960s and 1970s with his regular appearances in Carry On films and subsequently kept himself in the public eye with chat shows and other television work.

Williams was fondly regarded in the entertainment industry; in his private life, however, he suffered from depression. He kept a series of diaries throughout his life that achieved posthumous acclaim.

== Early life and education ==
Kenneth Charles Williams was born on 22 February 1926 in Bingfield Street, King's Cross, London. His parents were Charles George Williams (1900-1962), who managed a hairdresser's shop in the Kings Cross area, and Louisa Alexandra (née Morgan) (1901-1991), who worked in the business. Charles was a Methodist who had "a hatred of loose morals and effeminacy", according to Barry Took, Williams's biographer. Charles thought the theatre immoral and effeminate, although his son aspired to be involved in the profession from an early age. Between 1935 and 1956, Williams lived with his parents in a flat above his father's barber shop at 57 Marchmont Street, Bloomsbury. Williams had a half-sister, Alice Patricia "Pat", born to his mother in 1923 before she had met Charles, three years before Kenneth was born.

Williams was educated at the Lyulph Stanley Boys' Central Council School, a state-owned Central school, in Camden Town, North London, and was subsequently apprenticed as a draughtsman to a mapmaker. His apprenticeship was interrupted by the Blitz, and he was evacuated to the home of a bachelor veterinary surgeon in Bicester, Oxfordshire. This provided his first experience of an educated, middle-class life. He returned to London with a new, vowel-elongated accent. In 1944, aged 18, he was called up to the British Army. He became a sapper in the Royal Engineers Survey Section, doing much the same work that he had done as a civilian. When the war ended, he was in Ceylon, and he opted to transfer to the Combined Services Entertainment Unit, which put on revue shows. While in that unit, Williams met Stanley Baxter, Peter Vaughan, Peter Nichols, and John Schlesinger.

Both of Williams's parents were born in London, but with a Welsh heritage extending for several generations. Williams sometimes described himself as Welsh, noting his parents' surnames and origins in his diaries and in interviews.: In 1968, during the filming of Carry On Up the Khyber in Snowdonia National Park, Williams stated that "I always like being back in Wales. I always feel a hiraeth, it always comes back to you, once you step back into the place where you have atavistic memories." A year later, Williams would describe a debate in Ireland when he was told he had some nerve showing his "English face in Dublin". Williams dramatically responded with a "very slow take and riposted 'Wanna get your facts right, dear, I'm Welsh'" before rising to his feet and reciting The Bard, a Pindaric Ode by Thomas Gray. Williams noted that this performance was cut short by applause, for which he was grateful as he did not know any more of the poem. Two years before his death, Williams guest hosted the Wogan chatshow; drawing the audience's attention to a display of red roses, Williams commented, "It's St George's Day today and the rose is the symbol of St George, the patron saint of England. I wouldn't know anything about it. I'm not English, I'm Welsh." before proclaiming "Mymryn bach o Gymru, Cymru sydd, Cymru fydd – Cymru am byth!" (A little bit of Wales, Wales is, Wales will be – Wales forever!)

== Career ==
=== Early career ===
Williams's professional career began in 1948 in repertory theatre. Failure to become a serious dramatic actor disappointed him, but his potential as a comic performer gave him his break when he was spotted playing the Dauphin in Bernard Shaw's St Joan in the West End, in 1954 by radio producer Dennis Main Wilson. Main Wilson was casting Hancock's Half Hour, a radio series starring Tony Hancock. Playing mostly funny voice roles, Williams stayed in the series almost to the end, five years later. His nasal, whiny, camp-cockney inflections (epitomised in his "Stop messing about ... !" catchphrase) became popular with listeners. Despite the success and recognition the show brought him, Williams considered theatre, film and television to be superior forms of entertainment. In 1955 he appeared in Orson Welles's London stage production Moby Dick—Rehearsed. The pair fell out after Williams became annoyed with Welles's habit of repeatedly changing the script.

When Hancock steered his show away from what he considered gimmicks and silly voices, Williams found he had less to do. Tiring of this reduced status, he joined Kenneth Horne in Beyond Our Ken (1958–1964), and its sequel, Round the Horne (1965–1968). His roles in Round the Horne included Rambling Syd Rumpo, the eccentric folk singer; Dr Chou En Ginsberg, MA (failed), Oriental criminal mastermind; J. Peasemold Gruntfuttock, telephone heavy breather and dirty old man; and Sandy of the camp couple Julian and Sandy (Julian was played by Hugh Paddick). Their double act was characterised by double entendres and Polari, the homosexual argot.

Williams also appeared in West End revues including Share My Lettuce with Maggie Smith, written by Bamber Gascoigne, and Pieces of Eight with Fenella Fielding. The latter included material specially written for him by Peter Cook, then a student at Pembroke College, Cambridge. Cook's "One Leg Too Few" and "Interesting Facts" were part of the show and became routines in his own performances. Williams's last revue, in 1961, was One Over The Eight at the Duke of York's Theatre, with Sheila Hancock.

=== Carry On films ===
Williams worked regularly in British film during the late 1950s, 1960s and 1970s, mainly in the Carry On series (1958–1978) with its double entendre humour; and appeared in the series more than any other actor. The films were commercially successful but Williams claimed the cast were poorly paid. In his diaries, Williams wrote that he earned more in a St Ivel advert than for any Carry On film, although he was still earning the average Briton's annual salary in a year for the latter. He often privately criticised and "dripped vitriol" upon the films, considering them beneath him, even though he continued to appear in them. This became the case with many of the films and shows in which he appeared. He was quick to find fault with his own work, and also that of others. Despite this, he spoke fondly of the Carry Ons in interviews. Peter Rogers, producer of the series, recollected, "Kenneth was worth taking care of because, while he cost very little—£5,000 a film, he made a great deal of money for the franchise."

=== Radio and television shows ===
Williams was a regular on the BBC Radio impromptu-speaking panel game Just a Minute from its second series in 1968 until his death. He frequently got into arguments with host Nicholas Parsons and other guests on the show. (Russell Davies, editor of The Kenneth Williams Letters, explains that Williams's "famous tirades on the programme occurred when his desire to entertain was fuelled by his annoyance.") He was also remembered for such phrases as "I've come all the way from Great Portland Street" (i.e. one block away) and "They shouldn't have women on the show!" (directed at Sheila Hancock, Aimi MacDonald and others). He once talked for almost a minute about a supposed Austrian psychiatrist called Heinrich Swartzberg, correctly guessing that the show's creator, Ian Messiter, had just made the name up. Williams was also a regular on the BBC Radio comedy show Round the Horne, playing, alongside Hugh Paddick, the characters Julian and Sandy who spoke in a comedic version of Polari.

On television, he co-hosted his own TV variety series on BBC2 with the Young Generation titled Meanwhile, On BBC2, which ran for ten episodes from 17 April 1971. He was a frequent contributor to the 1973–74 revival of What's My Line?, hosted the weekly entertainment show International Cabaret and was a regular reader on the children's storytelling series Jackanory on BBC1, hosting 69 episodes. He also narrated and provided all of the voices for the BBC children's cartoon Willo the Wisp (1981).

In 1983, Williams was the subject of an episode of the BBC series Comic Roots, in which he revisited the places in London where he grew up and went to school.

=== Writing ===
As well as his diaries (see below), Kenneth Williams wrote occasional 'Preview' columns for Radio Times in the 1970s, commenting on upcoming BBC television and radio programmes.

== Personal life and death ==
On 14 October 1962, Williams's father, Charlie Williams, was taken to hospital after drinking carbon tetrachloride that had been stored in a cough-mixture bottle. He died the following day. An hour after being given the news, Williams went on stage in the West End. Williams was later denied a visa to the United States when it emerged that Scotland Yard had suspected him of poisoning his father. The coroner's court recorded a verdict of accidental death due to corrosive poisoning by carbon tetrachloride. Williams said he believed his father had committed suicide, because the circumstances leading to the poisoning seemed unlikely to have happened by misfortune.

As a younger man, Williams was a socialist but came to move in a more conservative direction and espoused capitalism.

Williams often said that he was asexual and celibate, and his diaries appear to substantiate his claims—at least from his early forties onwards. He lived alone all his adult life and had few close companions apart from his mother, and no significant long-term romantic partner. Williams's only significant romantic relationship lasted a period of four years from 1958 when he met an Australian man, Paul Florence, with whom he remained close until Florence returned to Australia in 1961. They remained in contact, exchanging letters and telephone calls until Williams's death.

Williams's diaries contain references to unconsummated or barely consummated homosexual dalliances, which he describes as "traditional matters" or "tradiola". He befriended gay playwright Joe Orton, who wrote the role of Inspector Truscott in Loot (1965) for him. Williams went on holidays to Morocco with Orton and his partner, Kenneth Halliwell. Other close friends included Stanley Baxter, Gordon Jackson and his wife Rona Anderson, Sheila Hancock, and Maggie Smith and her playwright husband, Beverley Cross. Williams was also fond of fellow Carry On regulars Barbara Windsor, Bernard Bresslaw, Peter Butterworth, Kenneth Connor, Hattie Jacques and Joan Sims.

From the mid-1950s, Williams lived in a succession of small rented flats in central London. After his father had died, his mother Louisa lived near him, and then in the flat next to his. His last home was in a block of flats called Marlborough House on Osnaburgh Street in Bloomsbury (since demolished).

Williams rarely revealed details of his private life, although, in two half-hour documentary programmes in 1977 on BBC Radio London titled Carry On Kenneth, he spoke openly to Owen Spencer-Thomas about his loneliness, despondency and sense of underachievement.

He died on 15 April 1988 in his flat. His last words, recorded in his diary, were "Oh, what's the bloody point?" and the cause of death was an overdose of barbiturates. An inquest recorded an open verdict, because it was not possible to establish whether his death was suicide or an accident. His diaries reveal that he had often had suicidal thoughts, and some of his earliest diaries record periodic feelings that there was no point in living. His authorised biography argues that Williams did not take his own life but died of an accidental overdose. He had doubled his dosage of antacid, a treatment for stomach pains, without discussing it with his doctor. That, combined with the mixture of medication, is the widely accepted cause of death. He had a stock of painkilling tablets and it is argued that he would have taken more of them if he had been intending suicide. He was cremated at East Finchley Cemetery, and his ashes were scattered in the memorial gardens. Williams left an estate worth just under £540,000 (approximately equivalent to £1,503,000 in 2025).

== Legacy ==
=== Diaries and biographies ===
In April 2008 Radio 4 broadcast the two-part The Pain of Laughter: The Last Days of Kenneth Williams. The programmes were researched and written by Wes Butters and narrated by Rob Brydon. Butters purchased a collection of Williams's personal belongings from the actor's godson, Robert Chidell, to whom they had been bequeathed.

The first of the programmes said that, towards the end of his life and struggling with depression and ill health, Williams abandoned Christianity following discussions with the poet Philip Larkin. Williams had been brought up as a Methodist in the Wesleyan Methodist Church (which united with the Primitive Methodist Church and the United Methodist Church in 1932 to form the Methodist Church of Great Britain), though he spent much of his life struggling with Christianity's teachings on homosexuality.

Kenneth Williams Unseen by Wes Butters and Russell Davies, the first Williams biography in 15 years, was published by HarperCollins in October 2008.

An authorised biography, Born Brilliant: The Life of Kenneth Williams, by Christopher Stevens, was published in October 2010. This drew for the first time on the full Williams archive of diaries and letters, which had been stored in a London bank for 15 years following publication of edited extracts. The biography notes that Williams used a variety of handwriting styles and colours in his journals, switching between different hands on the page.

September 2025 saw the publication of Beyond Our Kenneth, a work of imagination continuing Kenneth Williams's diaries as if he had not died in 1988.

=== Portrayals ===
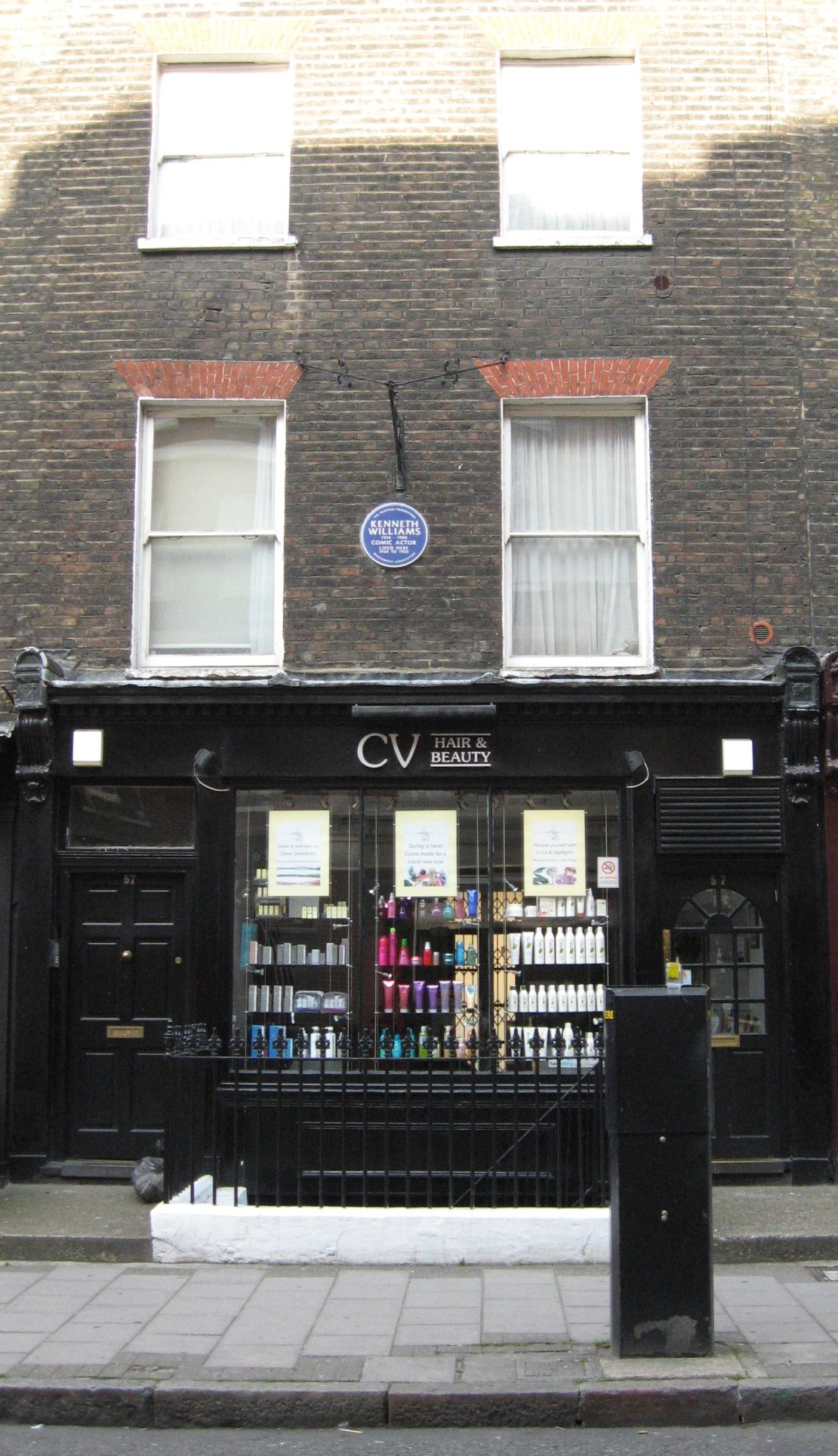
Williams's blue plaque at 57 Marchmont Street

David Benson's 1996 Edinburgh Fringe show Think No Evil of Us: My Life with Kenneth Williams saw Benson playing Williams; after touring, the show ran in London's West End. Benson reprised his performance at the 2006 Edinburgh Fringe. Benson reprised his performance once more for a new tour in 2026 commemorating the 100th anniversary of William's birth, the tour kicked off on the 29th of September at the Theatre Royal, Bury St Edmunds where Benson had first performed the show in 1996.

Williams was played by Adam Godley in Terry Johnson's play Cleo, Camping, Emmanuelle and Dick, which premiered at the National Theatre in 1998. Godley reprised the role in the subsequent film adaptation, Cor, Blimey!

In 2006, Williams's life was the subject of the television play Kenneth Williams: Fantabulosa! Michael Sheen portrayed Williams.

=== Recognition ===
A flat in the Osnaburgh Street block in which Williams lived from 1972 until his death was bought by Rob Brydon and Julia Davis for the writing of their comedy series Human Remains. The building was demolished in 2007.

Williams is commemorated by a blue plaque at the address of his father's barber shop, 57 Marchmont Street, London, where he lived from 1935 to 1956. The plaque was unveiled on 11 October 2009 by Leslie Phillips, Bill Pertwee and Nicholas Parsons, with whom Williams performed.

On 22 February 2014, on what would have been Williams's 88th birthday, an English Heritage blue plaque was unveiled at Farley Court off Marylebone Road, where Williams lived between 1963 and 1970. Speaking at the ceremony, his Carry On co-star Barbara Windsor said: "Kenny was a one-off, a true original".

== Performances ==
=== Stage ===
- Victoria Theatre and Concert Hall Singapore (1946)
- Seven Keys to Baldpate (début)

The Newquay Repertory Players (1948) in order of performance:

- The First Mrs. Fraser (Ninian Fraser)
- The Sacred Heart
- Night Must Fall (Lord Chief Justice)
- This Blessed Plot
- George and Margaret
- Fools Rush In (Joe - the bridegroom)
- The Bread-Winner (Patrick)
- Pink String and Sealing Wax
- The Dover Road
- The Long Mirror
- Private Lives
- Frieda (Tony Dawson)
- The Poltergeist
- Jupiter Laughs
- Grand National Night (Morton)
- The Sacred Flame (Dr Harvester)
- High Temperature
- The Light of Heart
- The Importance of Being Earnest (Algernon Moncrief)

The Dolphin Players (1948) in order of performance:

- On Approval
- Candida
- An Inspector Calls
- Tobias and the Angel

Other plays:

- Saint Joan at the Arts Theatre and New Theatre, London (1954) (Dauphin)
- Moby Dick—Rehearsed at the Duke of York's Theatre, London (1955)
- The Buccaneer at the Apollo Theatre, London (1956) (Patrick)
- Hotel Paradiso at the Winter Garden Theatre, London (1956) (Maxime)
- Share My Lettuce (revue) at the Lyric Theatre, Hammersmith, Comedy Theatre and Garrick Theatre, London (1957)
- Cinderella (pantomime) at the London Coliseum (1958)
- Pieces of Eight (revue) at the Apollo Theatre, London (1959)
- One Over the Eight (revue) at the Duke of York's Theatre, London (1961)
- The Private Ear and The Public Eye at the Globe Theatre, London (1962)
- Gentle Jack at the Queen's Theatre, London (1963)
- Loot – UK Tour (1965)
- The Platinum Cat at Wyndham's Theatre, London (1965)
- Captain Brassbound's Conversion at the Cambridge Theatre, London (1971)
- My Fat Friend at the Globe Theatre, London (1972)
- Signed and Sealed (Le Mariage de Barillon by Georges Feydeau translated by Hampton) at the Comedy Theatre, London (1976) (Barillon)
- The Undertaking at the Fortune Theatre, London (1979)
- Loot (directed) at the Lyric Theatre, Hammersmith and Arts Theatre, London (1980)
- Entertaining Mr Sloane (directed) at the Lyric Theatre, Hammersmith, London (1981)

== Radio ==
- Monday Matinee: Passport to Pimlico (6 October 1952), Light Programme - (as Benny)
- Hancock's Half Hour
- Beyond Our Ken
- Round the Horne
- Julian and Sandy
- The Betty Witherspoon Show
- Kenneth Williams Playhouse
- Kenneth Williams Cabaret
- The Secret Life of Kenneth Williams
- Oh Get On with It
- Just a Minute
- Stop Messing About
- Story Time (BBC Radio 4): 'Augustus Carp Esq by Himself' (Augustus Carp, Esq.) - abridged in ten parts - (from 27th. July 1979)
- The Wind in the Willows
- Post Mortem by Stuart Jackman
- Diary of a Madman by Nikolai Gogol

== Films ==
- Trent's Last Case (1952) as Horace Evans, the gardener (uncredited)
- Valley of Song (1953) as Lloyd The Haulage
- The Beggar's Opera (1953) as Jack The Pot Boy
- Innocents in Paris (1953) as window dresser at London airport (uncredited)
- The Seekers (1954) as Peter Wishart
- Three Men in a Boat (1956) as Hampton Court Maze Attendant (uncredited)
- Carry On Sergeant (1958) as James Bailey
- Carry On Nurse (1959) as Oliver Reckitt
- Carry On Teacher (1959) as Edwin Milton
- Tommy the Toreador (1959) as Vice-Consul
- Carry On Constable (1960) as Constable Stanley Benson
- Make Mine Mink (1960) as Freddie Warrington
- His and Hers (1961) as Policeman; uncredited airport reporter's overdubbed voice
- Raising the Wind (1961) as Harold Chesney
- Carry On Regardless (1961) as Francis Courtenay
- Twice Round the Daffodils (1962) as Henry Halfpenny
- Carry On Cruising (1962) as First Officer Leonard Marjoribanks
- Carry On Jack (1963) as Captain Fearless
- Carry On Spying (1964) as Desmond Simkins
- Carry On Cleo (1964) as Julius Caesar
- Carry On Cowboy (1965) as Judge Burke
- Carry On Screaming! (1966) as Dr Watt
- Don't Lose Your Head (1966) as Citizen Camembert
- Follow That Camel (1967) as Commandant Burger
- Carry On Doctor (1967) as Dr Kenneth Tinkle
- Carry On Up the Khyber (1968) as the Khasi of Khalabar
- Carry On Camping (1969) as Dr Kenneth Soaper
- Carry On Again Doctor (1969) as Frederick Carver
- Carry On Loving (1970) as Percival Snooper
- Carry On Henry (1971) as Thomas Cromwell
- Carry On at Your Convenience (1971) as WC Boggs
- Carry On Matron (1972) as Sir Bernard Cutting
- Carry On Abroad (1972) as Stuart Farquhar
- Carry On Dick (1974) as Captain Desmond Fancey
- Carry On Behind (1975) as Professor Roland Crump
- That's Carry On! (1977) as Presenter
- The Hound of the Baskervilles (1978) as Sir Henry Baskerville
- Carry On Emmannuelle (1978) as Emile Prevert
- The Thief and the Cobbler (1993) as Goblet / Tickle (voice) (final film role)

== Television ==
- Wogan's Radio Fun (1987) Julian and Sandy sketch with Hugh Paddick
- International Cabaret (1966–1974) as Himself – Host
- The Kenneth Williams Show (1970–1976) as Himself
- Jackanory (1968–1986) as Storyteller
- Willo the Wisp (all voices, 1981)
- Galloping Galaxies (1985–1986)
- An Audience with Kenneth Williams (1983) as Himself
- Bilko on Parade (1984) as Narrator (Phil Silvers)
- Countdown
- Parkinson in Australia (1981) as Himself
- What's My Line?
- Some You Win as Himself
- Whizzkids Guide (1981) as Himself ( Peter Eldin)
- Tomorrow's World (1981) as Himself
- Let's Make a Musical (1977) as Himself
- Going Places (1975) as Presenter
- Good Afternoon (1974), as guset; with Mavis Nicholson, Peter Cook, and Dudley Moore.
- Meanwhile, on BBC2 (1971)
- Join Jim Dale (1969) as Himself (one episode, 10/7/'69)
- The Wednesday Play, 'Catch as Catch Can', (1964) as Napoleon (by Jean Anouilh)
- BBC Sunday Night Theatre (1952–1958) as Captain Chalford / The Angel
- Saint Joan (1958) as The Dauphin
- Sword of Freedom
- The School
- Dick and the Duchess (1957) as Clive
- The Armoured Car
- Misalliance (1954) as Bentley Summerhays

== Recordings ==
- Share my lettuce - A Nixa Original Cast Recording. Williams as Lettuce Green, with Philip Gilbert, Roderick Cook, Maggie Smith and company. Nixa 18011 plum label LP, 1957.
- Kenneth Williams EP 1963, Decca DFE 8548. Contains four sketches from the Pieces of Eight and One Over the Eight revues.
- Kenneth Williams on Pleasure Bent 1967, Decca LK 4856. Music by Ted Dicks, lyrics by Myles Rudge. Arrangements and musical direction by Barry Booth, sound supervision by Roger Cameron.
- The World of Kenneth Williams 1970, Decca SPA 64. Stereo edition of recordings from the 1950s and 1960s.
- The Bona World of Julian and Sandy 1976, DJM DJF20487
- Castle on Luke Street 1978, Sanctuary Records, SU0803. Roy Castle narrated eight stories from the David Lewis Series of books on side 1. Williams recorded "Lost and Found" on side 2. Dora Bryan, Derek Nimmo and Thora Hird narrated one story each.
- Williams also released several albums as Rambling Syd Rumpo.
- Kenneth Williams read eight Just William stories for Argo in the early 1980s.
- An audio reading of Monkey, Arthur Waley's translation of Journey to the West, for Nimbus Records (1981). Re-released on MP3 CD:NI5888, in 2008.
- Parlour Poetry: Comic, Patriotic and Improving Verse from the Victorian Age: (1978): Saydisc Label: SDL294: CD Re-release: 2009.

There are also several recordings of Round the Horne and Just a Minute that include Williams.

== Books ==
- Acid Drops (1980) OCLC 641946857
- Back Drops (1983) OCLC 917385026
- Just Williams (1985) OCLC 230844446
- I Only Have To Close My Eyes (1986) OCLC 1107752080
- The Kenneth Williams Diaries (1993) OCLC 971678777
- The Kenneth Williams Letters (1994) OCLC 909213173
