= Margaret Hubble =

British radio broadcaster (1914–2006)

Evening News, 1951

Margaret Elinor Hubble (29 December 1914 – 30 August 2006) was a British radio broadcaster. She was best known as a presenter of Woman's Hour in the 1950s.

Hubble was born in Kent, the youngest of five children of a farmer. She attended a boarding school in Sussex, and joined the commercial radio department at advertising agency Erwin, Wasey & Company in 1938. She joined the Women's Land Army when the Second World War broke out, making use of her agricultural upbringing, but then joined the BBC in 1940 as a secretary, but quickly moved into broadcasting. She became an overseas presentation assistant in 1941, and then chief announcer for the BBC African Service in 1942, presenting Forces Favourites, a request programme in which members of the armed forces abroad, and their families at home, could ask the "compère", as presenters were called, to play their favourite music. There, she helped Jean Metcalfe make her first broadcast.

She was the first woman announcer to broadcast on the Allied Expeditionary Forces Programme, the successor to the General Forces Programme, in 1943, and she was one of the first announcers on the Light Programme in 1945.

She married Albert Cuthbert in June 1945, and, like most married women, resigned her full-time job to become a full-time wife. She rejoined the BBC in 1948 after her husband's early death.

Hubble appeared on Desert Island Discs in September 1945, standing in at short notice for Roy Plomley's invited guest, Valerie Hobson, who had flu. She occasionally presented Family Favourites (also known as Two-Way Family Favourites), the peacetime successor to Forces Favourites, from 1945 until 1952. She became an announcer on Woman's Hour in 1951, with Marjorie Anderson and Jean Metcalfe.

She married Philip Horne in 1950, and resigned from the BBC again in 1952. She continued to work as on a freelance basis, rejoining Woman's Hour in 1957, and presenting other programmes on the Light Programme. She also took part in Children's Hour on the Home Service, and Saturday Excursion on television.

Hubble narrated Children's Newsreel from 1959, alongside Douglas Henderson, and presented Call from Home for the British Forces Broadcasting Service from 1969.
