= Brian Matthew =

English broadcaster

- Born: 17 September 1928; Coventry, Warwickshire, England
- Died: 8 April 2017 (aged 88); London, England
- Spouse: Pamela Wickington (m. 1951)
- Children: 1
- Presenting career
- Previous shows: Saturday Club, Easy Beat, Thank Your Lucky Stars, Round Midnight (1978–1990), Sounds of the 60s (1990–2017)

Brian Matthew (17 September 1928 – 8 April 2017) was an English broadcaster who worked for the BBC for 63 years from 1954 until 2017. He was the host of Saturday Club, among other programmes, and began presenting Sounds of the 60s in March 1990, often employing the same vocabulary and the same measured delivery he had used in previous decades.

In January 2017, after a short break from the programme after suffering a fall at home, the BBC announced, against Matthew's wishes, that he would not be returning to the programme and that he would be replaced by Tony Blackburn. Matthew later died of pneumonia on 8 April 2017, aged 88.

== Early life ==
Matthew was born on 17 September 1928 in Coventry, Warwickshire, the son of musical parents. His father was a conductor of the Coventry Silver Band and his mother a professional singer. He was educated at the city's Bablake School.

== Career ==
Matthew first broadcast in Germany in 1948, and trained as an actor at RADA before joining the BBC in 1954. On the BBC Light Programme, as a staff announcer, he introduced numerous programmes including Take It From Here and Saturday Club (originally called Saturday Skiffle Club, starting in 1957 and changing to its more familiar name in 1958) and Easy Beat (starting in 1960). Also starting in the 1960s he had a regular show on Radio Luxembourg. At the time, airtime for pop music on BBC Radio was limited, and the demand for it among young people meant the shows attracted large audiences. Virtually all the big names of the era, including the Beatles, appeared on the shows. Matthew's voice is present on the Beatles' Live at the BBC and On Air – Live at the BBC Volume 2 CD compilations, as well as other BBC session compilations from bands such as Led Zeppelin, Cream, and the Who. On television, he was the presenter of Thank Your Lucky Stars (ITV, 1961–66).

The influence of Easy Beat on radio declined owing to the rise of offshore radio after 1964. When BBC Radio 1, BBC Radio 2, BBC Radio 3 and BBC Radio 4 launched in 1967, Easy Beat was dropped, and Saturday Club was taken over by another presenter, Keith Skues (formerly of the "pirate" Radio London), before it too was axed in 1969. Matthew celebrated the 50th anniversary of the first edition of Saturday Club in a special edition of Sounds of the 60s on 4 October 2008, by featuring some recordings from some of the shows and entertaining listeners with some reminiscences. In 1972, he narrated The Beatles Story, a 12-part documentary series on BBC Radio 1 and 2, which has been repeated on BBC Radio 6 Music.

In 1973, Matthew fronted a new radio series entitled My Top 12, which lasted for an hour on weekend afternoons on Radio 1. The programme was later presented by Bob Harris and Noel Edmonds. Guests in 1974 included Rod Stewart, Joni Mitchell and Neil Diamond.

Later, Matthew was the presenter of BBC Radio 2's arts magazine Round Midnight, from 1978 to 1990. From 1990 he hosted Sounds of the 60s (a programme first presented in 1983 by Keith Fordyce) on the same network on Saturday mornings, playing many of the records he initially played on Saturday Club and Easy Beat.

Matthew announced at the end of his show on 26 August 2006 that owing to ill-health he would be taking several weeks off his Radio 2 show, for the first time in sixteen years. Johnnie Walker was the main host in his absence. Sandie Shaw, Joe Brown and Suzi Quatro were also guest hosts. Matthew returned to the show and the station on 10 February 2007.

Matthew won a Sony Gold Award in 2008: "To celebrate an impressive record of more than 50 years of national and international radio broadcasting. For that lifetime career and in recognition of a truly outstanding contribution to UK radio." On 29 October 2016 Matthew became the oldest regular broadcaster on BBC Radio, following Desmond Carrington's retirement.

On 26 November 2016, Tim Rice stood in as presenter of the show. Rice announced that he would be sitting in for a few weeks since Matthew was "under the weather". In fact, Matthew had suffered a fall at home and had spent a few weeks in hospital. On 27 January 2017, the BBC announced that he would not return to the station due to ill health. Matthew himself, however, disagreed with the BBC's statement, saying: "That's absolute balderdash. I was ready and willing and able to go back, and they've just said they are going to put the programme in the hands of other people."

The BBC's treatment of Matthew led to an online petition, which was signed by thousands of listeners who demanded his return, but it failed. As a result, Matthew presented his final show on 25 February 2017, which was a compilation of his favourite tracks and moments from his time on the show. A week later, Sounds Of The 60s became a live show, hosted by Tony Blackburn, moving to an earlier slot between 6am and 8am on Saturday mornings. As of 2025, Blackburn continues to host the show between these times. During Matthew's tenure, the show was pre-recorded. However, on 6 March 2017, a show from January 2015 was broadcast in an early morning repeat slot, with new links recorded by Matthew.

== Personal life and death ==
In 1951, Matthew married Pamela Wickington, with whom he had one child, born in 1954. They involved themselves in amateur theatre and were prominent members of Chelsfield Players in Kent from 1958 to 1966. He built a theatre in his Chelsfield home and formed his own dramatic society called the Pilgrim Players. During this time he worked with actor brothers Arthur White and David Jason.

Matthew died of pneumonia on 8 April 2017 in London. Four days before his death, the BBC had reported that he had died, but later corrected this, saying he was critically ill in hospital. He was survived by his wife and their son.
