= Much-Binding-in-the-Marsh =

BBC radio comedy show

- Richard Murdoch, left, and Kenneth Horne in Much-Binding-in-the Marsh, 1948
- Genre: Radio comedy
- Country of origin: United Kingdom
- Language: English
- Home station: BBC Radio (1944–1950); Radio Luxembourg (1950–1951); BBC Radio (1951–1954)
- Starring: Richard Murdoch; Kenneth Horne; Sam Costa
- Written by: Richard Murdoch; Kenneth Horne
- Produced by: Leslie Bridgmont
- Original release: 1944 – 1954
- Sponsored by: Mars (1950–1951)

Much-Binding-in-the-Marsh was a comedy show broadcast from 1944 to 1950 and 1951 to 1954 by BBC Radio and in 1950–1951 by Radio Luxembourg. It was written by and starred Richard Murdoch and Kenneth Horne as officers in a fictional RAF station coping with red tape and the inconveniences and incongruities of life in the Second World War. After the war the station became a country club and, for its last season, the show became the chronicle of a newspaper, The Weekly Bind.

Among the supporting cast were Sam Costa as the officers' batman, Maurice Denham in a multitude of roles, Diana Morrison, Dora Bryan and Nicholas Parsons. Singers in the show's musical interludes included Gwen Catley, Maudie Edwards, Binnie Hale and Doris Hare. Among those appearing as guest stars were Phyllis Calvert, Richard Dimbleby, Glynis Johns, Alan Ladd and Jean Simmons.

The show followed It's That Man Again as the most popular British radio comedy and was succeeded by Take It from Here and The Goon Show. After the show ended, its two stars returned to radio in several long-running series.

== Background ==
During the Second World War radio comedy was an important feature of British national life. The fledgling television service started by the BBC in 1936 was suspended for the duration of the war and radio was the sole broadcasting medium, over which the BBC had a monopoly. The most prominent comedy show, It's That Man Again (ITMA), ran from 1939, and was reaching audiences of 16 million listeners by 1941. As well as broadcasting to the civilian population, the BBC had to provide entertainment for the armed forces. From early 1940 the BBC's General Forces Programme broadcast Merry-go-Round, (Note: Initially the title varied from show to show, in variants such as Mayfair Merry-go-Round, Merry-go-Lucky, Middle-East Merry-go-Round and Mediterranean Merry-go-Round.) originally a musical show to which comedy interludes were introduced. From this the BBC developed comedy shows aimed at each of the three branches of the armed forces: Eric Barker's HMS Waterlogged for the Royal Navy, Charlie Chester's Stand Easy for the Army and, for the Royal Air Force (RAF), Much-Binding-in-the-Marsh, Ralph Reader and his Gang Show and Café de NAAFI. All the programmes were largely written and performed by serving members of the respective services. The shows were broadcast in turn on a three-weekly cycle for each service, under the overall Merry-go-Round banner.

In 1943 Kenneth Horne—a wing commander at the Air Ministry in London—was writing and broadcasting on Ack-Ack, Beer-Beer, a BBC radio show for the Air Force based on those who worked for the RAF Balloon Command. He was also broadcasting on other shows, including those on the Overseas Recorded Broadcasting Service (ORBS), which were transmitted to British forces in the Middle East. His work with ORBS brought him into contact with Flight Lieutenant Richard Murdoch; with a great deal in common in their backgrounds and a similar sense of humour, the pair quickly formed a friendship. Horne informed Murdoch of a squadron leader vacancy in his section at the Ministry, and Murdoch became his colleague. Murdoch, a professional actor and entertainer for twelve years before the war, was well known to listeners from his pre-war role as co-star with the comedian Arthur Askey in the show Band Waggon.

On 4 January 1944 Horne and Murdoch appeared on a BBC programme for the armed forces, ENSA Half Hour, for a one-off show based on an idea from Horne based on life at "Much-Binding-in-the-Marsh", a fictional Royal Air Force station in remote rural England. Murdoch believed the idea could be developed into a sitcom and the two men worked together to produce more material. The producer of Merry-go-Round, Leslie Bridgmont, liked what they sent him and booked them to appear in the programme.

"Much-Binding-in-the-Marsh" drew on the name of a real RAF station at Moreton-in-Marsh, Gloucestershire, along with the word "binding", Air Force slang for grumbling or complaining. Bridgmont pictured it as "a desolate, decrepit aerodrome with its one hangar, the solitary aeroplane, 'Cabbage White Mark II', that never got off the ground and the crude outdoor 'ablutions'".

== Broadcasts ==
=== 1944–1946: RAF station ===
Horne's biographer Norman Hackforth writes that after the first broadcast in January 1944, the show "wasn't exactly an overnight sensation" but Bridgmont liked it enough to commission further episodes, and the show's popularity grew. By September 1945 the programme was being praised in the national popular press:

Perhaps it is that Dickie Murdoch and Kenneth Horne can not only write a good script, but one which fits their own personalities like a glove. Here, obviously, are a pair of first-class scripticians (oh, my word!). Other artists might take the hint.

The show continued to be broadcast as part of Merry-go-Round until February 1946. As the established star, Murdoch was given top billing in the new show. The 1947 billing reads "Richard Murdoch in Much-Binding-in-the-Marsh, with Kenneth Horne, Sam Costa and Marilyn Williams"; by 1954 the billing was "Richard Murdoch, Kenneth Horne and Sam Costa in Much-Binding ".

In the first shows the only regular characters were Horne's ponderous but genial Air Officer Commanding and Murdoch's junior officer, intelligent, humorous and able to manipulate his dim-witted superior. They were joined for a few early programmes by Joyce Grenfell, and in October 1944 Sam Costa joined the cast and became a permanent fixture as the OR aircraftsman.

In the early years Horne and Murdoch wrote in their office at the Air Ministry. Later they would meet either at Murdoch's house near Tunbridge Wells, Horne's flat in Kensington or the Royal Automobile Club in Pall Mall. They would toss ideas about and make notes of them; one of them would then turn the notes into a script to be transcribed by Bridgmont's secretary. (Note: Bridgmont described the manuscripts as "thirty pages of hieroglyphics" that only his secretary could decipher.) Typically, on the day of broadcast, the show would be rehearsed from 1 pm to 2:30, with a full run-through at 5 pm. The show would be given before a studio audience, broadcast live in the evening, and recorded for repeat transmission on home and forces networks later. Murdoch later described writing scripts with Horne as "pure joy", as the pair enjoyed the same sense of humour.

In the early shows, under the Merry-go-Round banner, the first half, with comic dialogue and narrative, was set in Murdoch's office at Much-Binding, after which the scene moved to the canteen for a concert—a spoof of typical NAAFI entertainments. "Flight Officer Flannel"—played by Binnie Hale, Dorothy Carless or Doris Hare, according to availability—would sing, as would Costa. Murdoch would perform one of his nonsense lyrics to well-known classical tunes, Horne would play the saxophone, and the show would conclude with a lively piece from the orchestra. Later, the show followed the precedent of ITMA and other programmes by being divided into comedy sections interspersed with music. Much-Binding settled into a pattern of three comedy sections separated by two musical slots: the first for the orchestra alone and the second for orchestra with singer.

The final edition of Much-Binding-in-the-March as part of Merry-go-Round was on 1 February 1946; the characters had been demobilised, and shook hands and went in separate directions outside the camp. By the end of the war, Much-Binding, sharing the Merry-go-Round slot with other shows, had appeared for just over twenty episodes, but was on its way to overtaking ITMA as the most popular British radio comedy.

=== 1947–1950: Country Club ===
The BBC was anxious to continue the show under its own name and with a new, civilian setting, although Murdoch was unavailable as he was about to start a national tour. They considered replacing him with either Eric Barker or Robb Wilton and moving the location from an RAF station to the "Much Binding Enterprises Ltd" factory or a crammer for backward schoolboys, but it was finally agreed that the two former Much-Binding officers, discovering their old station up for sale, should buy it and turn it into the Much-Binding Country Club. The first series under the name Much-Binding-in-the-Marsh ran for thirty-eight weeks from January to September 1947, and included a bank holiday special.

After the signature tune (the "Much-Binding" tune, for orchestra only) and opening announcement, usually by Philip Slessor, "Much-Binding takes the air!", Horne would introduce "Your old friend, Richard Murdoch!", to deliver a monologue outlining the news—ranging from incongruous to bizarre—from Much-Binding over the past week. This would be followed by the first musical interlude, after which Horne would enter, greeted by Murdoch with "Good morning, sir. It is good to see you", and then, as Barry Johnston, Horne's biographer, puts it, "they would be off, gradually bringing in the other characters one by one". In the seventh episode of the series, Maurice Denham joined the cast playing multiple roles; such was his vocal dexterity that Murdoch described him as "a vocal chameleon".

The second series ran for thirty weeks, from November 1947 to June 1948. The programme was broadcast on Wednesday evenings, but for several weeks the BBC moved the broadcast times, causing many complaints from listeners. Horne wrote to the BBC management to complain and ask for a consistent time; Much-Binding was eventually set to be regularly broadcast at 7:00 pm. Between January and June 1948 Murdoch wrote six instalments of The Chronicles of Much-Binding-in-the-Marsh, a spin-off series, published monthly, in The Strand Magazine. The cast from series one returned and were joined by the sopranos Janet Davis and Gwen Catley. Catley, an established opera performer, left after six programmes as she thought her voice was not suitable for the music.

The third series ran for forty-three weeks, from September 1948 to July 1949. For the recording on 28 December 1948, the queen and a party of twelve were in the audience; included in the party were Princess Elizabeth (later Queen Elizabeth II) who was on her first public appearance since the birth of her first son—Prince, now King Charles, six months earlier—and her husband, Prince Philip, Duke of Edinburgh. Several references to the royals were made during the programme and during the closing song Murdoch used his catchphrase "Good old Char-lee!" By the end of the series, the quality of the material "began to falter noticeably", according to Johnston.

The fourth series ran for twenty-seven weeks, from March to September 1950. A former performer from ITMA, Diana Morrison, was added to the cast; her range of comic voices added to the variety of characters. The number of listeners dropped sharply after the ninth episode of the series, falling from 74 per cent of the audience in March 1949 to 39 per cent in late June. The drop caused consternation at the BBC. T. W. Chalmers, the Controller of the BBC Light Entertainment Programme, considered the public had tired of the programme because Horne and Murdoch were too tied to the characters and were unable to devise any new storylines that fitted with the format. The BBC decided to cut short the series and did not pick up the option of a further thirteen programmes. The place once held by ITMA and then Much Binding as Britain's most popular radio comedy was now occupied by Take It from Here.

=== 1950–1951: Commercial radio ===
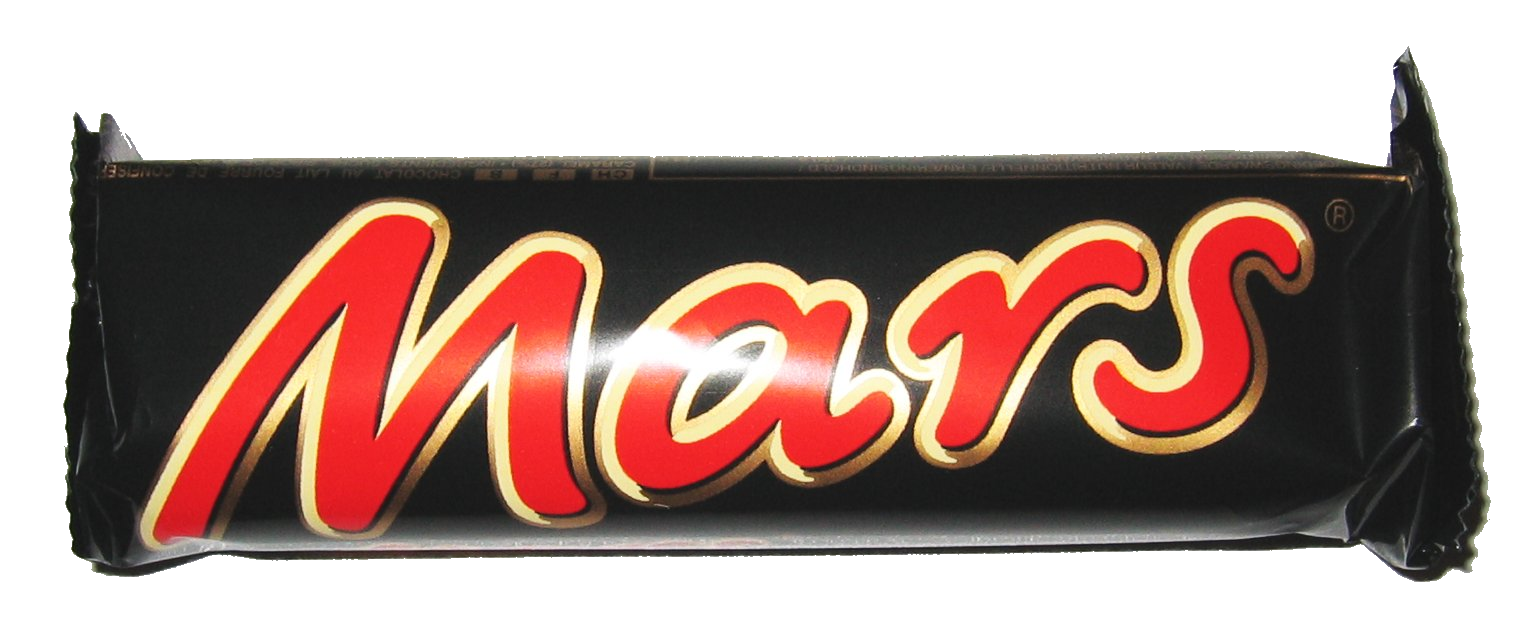
Mars, the sponsors of the series while on Radio Luxembourg

Although the BBC promised a new series for the following year to Murdoch, Horne and Costa to ensure they did not look for work elsewhere, they accepted an offer from Radio Luxembourg for £50,000 for one series. (Note: £50,000 in 1950 is approximately £1,480,000 in 2025, according to calculations based on Consumer Price Index measure of inflation.) The BBC were angered and concerned by the move of the series to Radio Luxembourg, but as none of the performers were under contract to the organisation at that point, they were not constrained by the restrictive clause in most BBC contracts that stopped its performers working for the BBC's competitors. As they could not prevent Horne and Murdoch from working for Radio Luxembourg, the BBC withdrew its offer of a series the following year and did not renew its contract with Horne to return as the chairman of Twenty Questions.

Much-Binding ran for one series of thirty-four shows on Radio Luxembourg between October 1950 and June 1951, recorded in studios off Baker Street, London, and broadcast at 3 pm on Sundays. The cast comprised Murdoch, Horne, Costa, Denham and Bryan. The programmes were compered by Bob Danvers-Walker, who announced the sponsor, Mars bars. Confectionery was still under rationing in the early 1950s, but the cast were given free supplies of chocolate by the sponsors, to the delight of their young families. Murdoch was not happy with the series and said: "It wasn't really a great success—even my mother said it was rotten, and she was my greatest fan."

=== 1951–1954: BBC and The Weekly Bind ===
Returning to the BBC in September 1951, the show was titled Over to You for its first season; it ran for twenty-eight weeks between September 1951 and April 1952. Murdoch and Horne had additional input to the scripts from Anthony Armstrong and Talbot Rothwell. The Radio Times described Over to You as "a successor" to Much Binding; the programme was due to have "rather more plot in each programme than in the previous series and a new ... equally catchy, topical jingle ... to close every show".

The final series of the show was titled Much Binding and was broadcast for thirty-five weeks from July 1953 to March 1954, every Friday at 9:30 pm. The return of the programme saw Murdoch and Horne pictured on the cover of The Radio Times and an interview with the cast inside. The show's premise changed to Murdoch inheriting the newspaper Sticklecrumpets Weekly, which was soon changed to The Weekly Bind. According to Horne, the paper's "circulation was only two when we took over—both elderly gentlemen who had somehow forgotten to cancel their subscriptions".

Morrison had left at the end of the previous series and was replaced by Dora Bryan, who joined the cast as Miss Gladys Plum, the newspaper's fashion expert. Costa played Prudence Gush, the radio critic, and Denham added more roles to his repertoire, including Mr Bubul the printer, Mulch the gardener and "the strip man—the chap who draws those thrilling adventures on the back page". He was not available after episode 23, and his place was taken by Nicholas Parsons.

In one episode the paper ran out of the letter 'e' and Mr Bubul replaced all of them with the letter 'o', turning the paper into The Wookly Bind. The sports section included a report on the "crickot" that began "Aftor tho Tost match at Loods, tho Onglish toam was agrood by tho soloctors at a committoo mooting", and Betty Grable became "Botty Grablo". In another episode Denham played all the parts of a whodunit (the butler, maid, Sir Anthony Dunkels, Lady Dunkels, their daughter and her boyfriend); he also provided the sound effects of a cocktail shaker, horse's hooves and a closing door, all completed within three minutes. Johnson described Denham's performance as "an incredible tour de force, switching from one voice to the other, until the play ended with all the characters being shot by a revolver".

By the mid-1950s tastes in comedy had changed and many of the wartime favourites—including ITMA, Stand Easy and Waterlogged Spa—were no longer on air, replaced by programmes featuring a new generation of performers and writers. According to Johnston, "the gentle humour of Much-Binding now seemed rather old-fashioned" and the programme was not renewed.

=== Later ===
Much-Binding-in-the-Marsh was a hit with Australian listeners, and in 1954 Murdoch was contracted by the Australian Broadcasting Commission for four months to provide a weekly variety programme Much Murdoch. He tried to persuade Horne to accompany him, but Horne was by then the sales director of Triplex Safety Glass and too busy to take a long break. Horne managed to travel to Australia to record eight shows of the series, which were retitled Much Murdoch and Horne for his appearances.

== Characters ==
Horne, Murdoch and Costa generally played their usual characters under their own names. The other characters appearing in the scripts were mainly handled by Maurice Denham and Diana Morrison, with assistance from some of the singers in small speaking roles. Both Denham and Morrison were already familiar to radio listeners, having appeared in ITMA, in which Denham's roles included the charlady, Lola Tickle; Morrison's principal ITMA character was the redoubtable Miss Hotchkiss. When Denham was unavailable during the 1954 series of Much Binding Nicholas Parsons stood in for him, but did not attempt Denham's multiplicity of roles.

=== Horne ===
In a history of British radio comedy Barry Took comments that Horne's "naïve, boring and foolish Senior Officer" was "the opposite of what he was in real life". He was given to asking, "Did I tell you about the time I was in Sidi Barrani?" before attempting to tell a boring anecdote, usually headed off by Murdoch.

=== Murdoch ===
The "quick-thinking, amusing and gentle CO" played by Murdoch was "a character very like himself", according to Took. His catch-phrases included "Have you read any good books lately?", when trying to change an awkward subject and, less explicably, "Good old Charlie-ee!"

=== Costa ===
Costa's character was a sort of batman to the two officers; his usual opening line was, "Good morning, sir! Was there something?". Took describes the character as "the archetypal grumbling aircraftsman, brighter than his 'betters' and unhappy with his lot". Johnston takes a different view of Costa's character, calling him "the amiable chump who always got things wrong, driving his superiors mad".

=== Supporting cast ===
==== Denham ====
Denham's principal character was the eager, obliging, upper-class Dudley Davenport, always keen to please ("Dudley Davenport at your service"). Dudley became celebrated for his characteristic gurgling laugh (spelled in the script "Keogh-keogh-keogh!"), his enthusiastic expression of approval—"Oh, jolly D!"—which became well known and much used at the time, and his usual exit line, "Oh, I say, I am a fool!"; his mother, Lady Davenport, was played by the singer and actress Babs Valerie. Denham also played some 60 more characters, including Mr Blake, the sexton, who spoke rustic nonsense in an impenetrable accent; Mr Bubul, the bumbling compositor of The Weekly Bind; Ivy Plackett, the exuberant proprietress of the village shop at Little Binding; Fred, another obliging person, whose genteel mangling of vowels turned "yes" into "yays"; and Nigel, an ill-mannered silkworm, given to burping after munching his mulberry leaves. Denham's other roles included Luigi the Italian, Winston the dog, Gregory the sparrow, Group Captain Funnybone, Lieutenant-General Sir Harold Tansley-Parkinson and the receptionist at Much-Binding, Ivy Clingbine ("Oh, what have I sayed!").

==== Morrison ====
Diana Morrison's characters included the negative Miss Catcheside (catchphrase "Naah"!); the landlady, Mrs Wimpole; the effusive Miss Gibbs (Gladys), whose amorous clutches Murdoch was anxious to avoid; and Annie Potter, a cheerful cockney with an extreme and contagious glottal stop that infected the pronunciation of those around her.

==== Others ====
Mr Greenslade, played by Parsons, was an excitable and loquacious Bristolian, who spoke faster and faster as he became more excited. He always finished with his catchphrase, "Oh, I never let the grass grow under my feet".

Fifi de la Bon-Bon, known as Mademoiselle Fifi, was the indoor games instructor; Barbara (Babs) Valerie played her with, in the words of Denis Gifford, many a coquettish "Ooh-la-la!". The Hon Babs du Croix Fotheringham, known as Queenie for short, played by the singer Dorothy Carless, was one of the WAAFs stationed at Much-Binding. She had little dialogue but had her own catch-phrase, "Okay, ducks!" Miss Louisa Goodbody, played by Vivienne Chatterton, was a seemingly frail old spinster who was nonetheless ready "to have a bash".

There were four characters who were regularly mentioned but never appeared: Horne's formidable wife Bessie, whose displeasure he strove to avoid ("Not a word to Bessie about this!"); Costa's wife, Emily, whose "twinges" were a regular problem; Edward Wilkinson, a mysterious and unexplained character to whom Murdoch and Horne frequently referred apropos of nothing: "By the way, have you seen anything of Edward Wilkinson lately?"; (Note: The real-life Edward Wilkinson was Horne's RAF driver, who became a good friend in post-war years.) and Charlie Farnsbarns, a dogsbody often mentioned by Costa. (Note: The last name became well enough known to be used by Peter Nichols in his 1977 play Privates on Parade, set c. 1950.)

=== Guests ===
In the ten years of its run Much-Binding featured occasional appearances by many guest stars, including Jean Simmons, Glynis Johns, Richard Dimbleby, Alan Ladd, Joyce Grenfell, Maudie Edwards and Phyllis Calvert.

== Music ==
The original idea for the show's signature tune, which became one of the best-known on BBC radio, was Horne's. He suggested to Murdoch that it would be a good idea if they had a song that began:

They worked out the shape of the rest of the tune and got their accompanist, Sidney Torch, to polish it and write it down in musical score. It consisted of an eight-line verse, of which a typical example is:

At Much-Binding-in-the-Marsh
Security has never been neglected.
At Much-Binding-in-the-Marsh,
We're careful that our station's not detected.
To camouflage the aeroplane, instead of using net,
The other day we painted it, and much to our regret,
We did it so successfully we haven't found it yet,
At Much-Binding-in-the-Marsh.

Alternatively, during the time of McCarthyism in the US, the lyrics went:

At Much-Binding-in-the-Marsh
We're nearly always short of filthy lucre.
At Much-Binding-in-the-March
We play a lot of after-dinner snooker,
To get a brand new snooker set we've constantly been urged
And yesterday this very startling fact emerged:
We've only got the colours left, the reds have all been purged.
At Much-Binding-in-the-Marsh.

Each week the closing music for the show consisted of four verses of the song, rising a semitone from one verse to the next. (Note: In the early broadcasts, the celebrated four-verse song ("a little thing that goes something like this") concluded the first half, rather than the whole show.) Over the years Horne and Murdoch wrote more than 500 verses for it, including topical material in the lyrics. Over its ten years, the programme featured several singers in the musical numbers in mid-show. Among them were Marilyn Williams, Maudie Edwards, Joan Winters, Dorothy Carless, Binnie Hale, Vivienne Chatterton and Gwen Catley.

In the early programmes the music was played by the RAF Orchestra, billed as "all-star", and numbering many of Britain's best young instrumentalists among its personnel. Torch conducted. The conductors of the various orchestras included Stanley Black, Billy Ternent, Harry Rabinowitz, Frank Cantell, Paul Fenoulhet, Robert Busby and Charles Shadwell. While on Radio Luxembourg, musical accompaniment for the first three programmes was provided by Woolf Phillips and the Skyrockets; the remainder of the series had music by the Squadronaires with Ronnie Aldrich as conductor. The orchestra was joined for the final series (1953–1954) by the BBC Men's Chorus, conducted by Leslie Woodgate.

== Legacy ==
When Horne and Murdoch left the BBC for Radio Luxembourg, the corporation were concerned that other popular variety performers could abandon the station in favour of commercial radio. They began searching for new performers and new styles to showcase, which led them to sign the Goons, whose show was first broadcast in May 1951.

Both the stars of Much Binding went on to later long-running BBC radio series: Horne to Beyond Our Ken (1958–1964) and Round the Horne (1965–1968) and Murdoch to The Men from the Ministry (1962–1977). Murdoch and Costa appeared on several episodes of Frost on Sunday in 1970, where they performed new topical lyrics to the theme tune. Murdoch also did the same in 1987 for Wogan's Radio Fun.

In March 1998 the minor planet 19453 was discovered and named Murdochorne after Murdoch and Horne.

== Output ==
Programme	Date	Channel	Notes	Refs.
ENSA Half-Hour	4 January 1944	BBC Forces Programme		
Mediterranean Merry-Go-Round	31 March 1944 –27 October 1944	BBC General Forces Programme	Broadcast on: 31 March 1944; 12 May 1944; 23 June 1944; 4 August 1944; 15 September 1944; 27 October 1944	
Christmas Night at Eight	25 December 1944	BBC Home Service		
Merry-Go-Round	19 January 1945 – 1 February 1946	BBC Home Service (to 9 September 1945) and BBC Light Programme (from 23 September 1945)	Broadcast on: 19 January 1945; 2 March 1945; 13 April 1945; 25 May 1945; 6 July 1945; 21 July 1945; 17 August 1945; 11 September 1945; 28 September 1945; 19 October 1945; 9 November 1945; 21 December 1945; 25 December 1945; 11 January 1946; 1 February 1946	
Much-Binding-in-the-Marsh	2 January 1947 – 18 September 1947	BBC Light Programme	38 weeks, including a bank holiday special	
Much-Binding-in-the-Marsh	26 November 1947 – 16 June 1948	BBC Light Programme	30 weeks, including a bank holiday special	
Much-Binding-in-the-Marsh	21 September 1948 – 12 July 1949	BBC Light Programme	43 weeks, plus a Christmas Day special	
Much-Binding-in-the-Marsh	15 March 1950 – 13 September 1950	BBC Light Programme	27 weeks	
Much-Binding-in-the-Marsh	30 October 1950 – 17 June 1951	Radio Luxembourg	34 weeks	
Over to You	30 September 1951 – 14 April 1952	BBC Light Programme	28 weeks	
Much Binding	21 July 1953 – 23 March 1954	BBC Light Programme	35 weeks	

Episodes from the archives have been re-broadcast on several BBC radio channels, some as recently as 2024.

== Notes and references ==
=== Sources ===
- Bridgmont, Leslie (1949). Leslie Bridgmont Presents. London: Falcon. OCLC 13408859.
- Briggs, Asa (1985). The BBC: The First Fifty Years. Oxford: Oxford University Press. ISBN 978-0-19-212971-0.
- Briggs, Asa (1995). The History of Broadcasting in the United Kingdom, Volume IV: Sound and Vision. Oxford: Oxford University Press. ISBN 978-0-19-212967-3.
- Crisell, Andrew (1997). An Introductory History of British Broadcasting. London: Routledge. ISBN 978-0-4151-2802-5.
- Farkas, Anna (2002). The Oxford Dictionary of Catchphrases. Oxford: Oxford University Press. ISBN 978-0-1986-6280-8.
- Foster, Andy; Furst, Steve (1996). Radio Comedy, 1938–1968: A Guide to 30 Years of Wonderful Wireless. London: Virgin Books. ISBN 978-0-86369-960-3.
- Gifford, Denis (1985). The Golden Age of Radio: An Illustrated Companion. London: Batsford. ISBN 978-0-7134-4234-2.
- Hackforth, Norman (1976). Solo for Horne: A Biography of Kenneth Horne. London: Angus & Robertson. ISBN 0-207-95650-2.
- Halliwell, Leslie (1987). Double Take and Fade Away: Halliwell on Comedians. London: Grafton. ISBN 978-0-2461-2835-5.
- Johnston, Barry (2007). Round Mr Horne: The Life of Kenneth Horne. London: Aurum Press. ISBN 978-1-84513-123-4.
- Nichols, Peter (1977). Privates on Parade. London: Faber. ISBN 978-0-571-11142-8.
- Nichols, Richard (1983). Radio Luxembourg, the Station of the Stars: An Affectionate History of 50 Years of Broadcasting. London: W. H. Allen. ISBN 978-0-86379-035-5.
- Partridge, Eric (1992). A Dictionary of Catch Phrases, American and British, from the Sixteenth Century to the Present Day. Lanham, MA: Rowman & Littlefield. ISBN 978-0-8128-8536-1.
- Rees, Nigel (1994). Dictionary of Catch Phrases. London: Bloomsbury. ISBN 978-1-85-605234-4.
- Ross, Robert (2021). Forgotten Heroes of Comedy: An Encyclopedia of the Comedy Underdog. London: Unbound. ISBN 978-1-7835-2918-6.
- Schmadel, Lutz D. (2003). Dictionary of Minor Planet Names (5th ed.). Berlin: Springer. ISBN 978-3-5400-0238-3.
- Street, Sean (2009). The A to Z of British Radio. Plymouth, Devon: Scarecrow Press. ISBN 978-0-8108-7013-0.
- Took, Barry (1981). Laughter in the Air: An Informal History of British Radio Comedy. London: Robson Books. ISBN 978-0-8605-1149-6.
