= Orbiter X =

- Genre: Science fiction
- Running time: 30 minutes
- Country of origin: United Kingdom
- Language: English
- Home station: BBC Light Programme
- Syndicates: BBC Radio 4 Extra
- Starring: John Carson; Andrew Crawford; Barrie Gosney; Donald Bisset; John Witty
- Created by: B. D. Chapman
- Written by: B. D. Chapman
- Produced by: Charles Maxwell
- Original release: 28 September – 28 December 1959
- No. of series: 1
- No. of episodes: 14
- Audio format: Monaural
- Website: www.bbc.co.uk/programmes/b077rlyw

Orbiter X: An adventure in the conquest of space is a BBC Radio science fiction programme written by B. D. Chapman. Only a single series was produced which was broadcast on the BBC Light Programme on Monday evenings in late 1959. Presumed to have been wiped and lost, a set of discs of the entire series, recorded for the BBC Transcription Service, was discovered and restored. Since 2016, Orbiter X has occasionally been repeated on the BBC's archive station, BBC Radio 4 Extra.

== Plot ==
The fictional Commonwealth Space Project (CSP), based in Woomera, South Australia, is working to build a space station orbiting a thousand miles above the Earth's surface: Orbiter X. Planned to be a refuelling station for further space exploration, along with laboratories and other services, the CSP has launched the various components for the space station into orbit. But before construction can begin, the first assembly ship, Orbiter 1, is seemingly attacked and loses contact with CSP Control. A second ship, Orbiter 2, piloted by Captain Bob Britton (John Carson), sent to rescue the first crew finds Orbiter 1 deserted and the spacecraft's log missing. Orbiter 2 is also attacked by a UFO and Flight Engineer 'Hicky' (Barrie Gosney) seriously injured. With their spacecraft crippled, the crew have no alternative but to abandon ship and place themselves at the mercy of their attackers. Once aboard the UFO, they meet Commander Gelbin (Arthur Lawrence), the deputy leader of the Unity organisation: a group of technocrats who plan to use Orbiter X themselves and create a New World Order.

== Background ==
Writing in the Radio Times, the programme's creator said:

With the arrival of the Russian moon probe in the lunar Sea of Serenity a fortnight ago, scientific fact and fiction have become curiously interwoven. The time cannot be far distant when man himself will be setting foot on the moon, but such an undertaking still poses major problems, not least of which is the question of fuel for the return trip.

At the present time, a rocket consumes the bulk of its fuel during its breakaway from the earth. To make the return trip possible, a refuelling point or terminal will be required beyond the limits of the atmosphere. This dual purpose could be served by a space station which would also be equipped with facilities such as a space laboratory, workshops, an observatory and, of course, living accommodation for the crew.

I believe that we shall see such a station taking shape within the course of the next ten years or so, and it is this possibility which has given me the background of the new serial.

For myself, I am hoping that the serial will not be outdated by the News before it starts!

— B.D. Chapman, Into Orbit with the Space Pioneers, Radio Times, 25 September 1959

== Production details ==
The producer of Orbiter X, Charles Maxwell, aimed to make the series authentic as possible. During the studio recordings, the cast wore 'space helmets' to help them to achieve a sense of realism. Harry Morriss and Ian Cook created around 40 different sound effects for the series, with "as many as four or five effects sometimes being blended together to produce one particular sound".

== Cast ==
The complete cast, as listed in the Radio Times, was:

| Part | Played by |
|---|---|
| Captain Bob Britton | John Carson |
| Captain Douglas McClelland | Andrew Crawford |
| Flight Engineer Hicks | Barrie Gosney |
| Colonel Kent | Donald Bisset |
| Captain Jack Bradley | John Witty |
| Control Officer Brown | Peter Noel Cook |
| Control Officer Camm | Francis Hall |
| U F O Commander Gelbin | Arthur Lawrence |
| Radio Operator | John Matthews |
| Max Kramer | Gerik Schjelderup |
| Greta Ravel | Irene Prador |
| Sir Charles Day | Leslie Perrins |
| Neasen | Ian Sadler |
| Letmann | John Cazabon |
| Captain Knight | John Graham |

== Episode list ==
| No. | First broadcast | Title |
|---|---|---|
| 1 | 28 Sep 1959 | The First Step to the Stars |
| 2 | 5 Oct 1959 | Conflict in Space |
| 3 | 12 Oct 1959 | The Master Plan |
| 4 | 19 Oct 1959 | Flight to the Moon |
| 5 | 26 Oct 1959 | Inside the Moon Station |
| 6 | 2 Nov 1959 | Breakaway |
| 7 | 9 Nov 1959 | Price of Survival |
| 8 | 16 Nov 1959 | Marooned in Space |
| 9 | 23 Nov 1959 | Operation Salvage |
| 10 | 30 Nov 1959 | Return to Woomera |
| 11 | 7 Dec 1959 | A Flight Against Time |
| 12 | 14 Dec 1959 | Building the Space Station |
| 13 | 21 Dec 1959 | The Net Closes |
| 14 | 28 Dec 1959 | The Final Round |
