= Thank Your Lucky Stars (TV series) =

British television series

- The Beatles promoting the 24 August 1963 show
- Genre: Music Variety
- Presented by: Keith Fordyce; Brian Matthew; Jim Dale
- Judges: Janice Nicholls; Jimmy Savile; Pete Murray; Alan Dell; Sam Costa; Barry Alldis; Kent Walton; Jimmy Young; Don Moss
- Country of origin: United Kingdom
- Original language: English
- No. of series: 8
- No. of episodes: 250

Production
- Producer: Philip Jones
- Production locations: Alpha Studios, Birmingham
- Production company: ABC Television

Original release
- Network: ITV
- Release: 1 April 1961 – 31 December 1966

Thank Your Lucky Stars is a British television pop music show made by ABC Weekend TV, and broadcast on ITV from 1961 to 1966. Of all the show's presenters, Brian Matthew is perhaps the best remembered. Many of the leading pop groups of the time performed on it. As well as featuring British artists, it often included American guest stars.

It would appear from the surviving footage that the bands mimed their latest 45. Occasionally a band was allowed to do two numbers (possibly the A-side and B-side sides of their latest single or an EP or LP track); bands of a higher status such as The Beatles or The Rolling Stones would sometimes play up to as many as four numbers.

A typical 1961 programme listing included The Dale Sisters, Adam Faith, John Leyton, The Brook Brothers, Geoff Goddard and Dion.

Audience participation was a feature of Thank Your Lucky Stars, and the Spin-a-Disc section, in which a guest DJ and three teenagers reviewed three singles, was a feature of the show. Generally, American singles were reviewed. It was on that segment that Janice Nicholls appeared. She was a former office clerk from the English Midlands who became known for the catchphrase "Oi'll give it foive" which she said with a strong Black Country accent. After she was dropped from the show she trained as a chiropodist and ran a practice in Hednesford in Staffordshire. Billy Butler was another reviewer.

The Beatles' second national television performance was on the programme, the first being on children's programme Tuesday Rendezvous on 4 December 1962. The first theme song was by Peter Knight & The Knightriders and, later on, "Lunar Walk" by Johnny Hawksworth was used.

The show ended on 25 June 1966, after two thousand artists appearances. The Musicians' Union was not in favour of such shows because, until the change of policy in 1966, the songs were mimed.

The vast majority of Thank Your Lucky Stars shows are lost. Only a small handful are known have survived in full, as well as incomplete segments from other shows.

== Cultural references ==
The Generation X song "Ready Steady Go!" referred to the show in its lyric: "I'm not in love with Juke Box Jury/I'm not in love with Thank Your Lucky Stars".
