= Cliff Michelmore =

English television presenter (1919–2016)

Cliff Michelmore CBE
- Portrait by Vivienne, c. 1955–1965
- Born: Arthur Clifford Michelmore; 11 December 1919; Cowes, Isle of Wight, England
- Died: 16 March 2016 (aged 96); Petersfield, Hampshire, England
- Education: Loughborough College
- Occupations: Presenter; producer
- Employers: BBC Radio; BBC Television
- Notable credits: Tonight; 24 Hours; Holiday
- Spouse: Jean Metcalfe (m. 1950; died 2000)
- Children: 2, including Guy

Arthur Clifford Michelmore CBE (11 December 1919 – 16 March 2016) was an English television presenter and producer.

He presented the BBC Television programme Tonight from 1957 to 1965. He also hosted the BBC's television coverage of the Apollo Moon landings, the Aberfan disaster, the 1966 and 1970 UK general elections, the assassination of John F. Kennedy and the investiture of Prince Charles as Prince of Wales.

He was appointed Commander of the Order of the British Empire (CBE) in 1969.

== Early life ==
Michelmore was born in Cowes, Isle of Wight, on 11 December 1919, youngest of six children of insurance agent and former prison officer, police constable, and groom servant (Albert) Herbert Michelmore and Ellen, daughter of labourer Richard Alford. The Michelmores had moved to the Isle of Wight in hopes of relieving his father's tuberculosis. His father died when Michelmore was two years old, and he was raised – with five siblings – by his mother in a terraced house near the Cowes boatyards until being sent to live with his sister and her husband, a farmer. His mother was unable to afford the fares to the grammar school in Newport, so he attended Cowes Secondary School on Denmark Road in Cowes, where he was head boy and captain of cricket, Loughborough College, and Leicester College of Technology and Art. He was a member of the 32nd entry of the Aircraft Apprentice Scheme at No. 1 School of Technical Training RAF which was located at RAF Halton in Buckinghamshire. He was a squadron leader in the Royal Air Force during the Second World War and began broadcasting on British Forces Network radio.

== Broadcasting career ==
After the war he worked for BBC Radio and television as a freelance sports commentator, then as a news reporter and as a producer of children's programmes, including All Your Own.

From 1955 to 1957 Michelmore presented the BBC TV programme Highlight, a current affairs show with a reputation for uncompromising interviews. On 18 February 1957 he became anchor for BBC Television's new topical weekday magazine show Tonight, with Fyfe Robertson, which ran for eight years and attracted eight million viewers at its peak. This made him probably the most frequently appearing person on television at the time, and hence one of the best-known people in the UK. He was named BAFTA Television Personality of the Year in 1958. He was on air when the news of the assassination of John F. Kennedy broke in 1963. Michelmore introduced a 17-year-old David Bowie to his first television audience on Tonight in 1964. Bowie was introduced as the spokesman and founder of "The Society for the Prevention of Cruelty to Long-Haired Men".

When Tonight finished in 1965, Michelmore hosted a BBC One series called 24 Hours until 1968. In October 1966 he reported on the Aberfan disaster, where 116 children and 28 adults died after the collapse of a colliery spoil tip.

In 1967 Michelmore presented the UK segment of Our World, a worldwide TV broadcast that was the first to use satellite communication extensively in an attempt to "connect the whole world by television". The programme featured a performance by the Beatles of their song "All You Need Is Love". Michelmore presented coverage of the Apollo 11 mission to the Moon in 1969, alongside James Burke and Patrick Moore. In the 1970s and until the demise of Southern Television in December 1981 (the ITV contractor for much of southern England), Michelmore acted as chief anchor and presenter for the evening local news programme Day by Day. When the BBC closed its Lime Grove Studios in 1991, Michelmore presented the last broadcast from Lime Grove.

After leaving full-time television work, Michelmore became head of EMI's new video division. He was a regular presenter on BBC One's Holiday programme from 1969 to 1986, and presented other shows for BBC TV, ITV and BBC Radio.

Michelmore returned to the BBC on 18 November 2007 to present a programme on the BBC Parliament channel, recalling the 1967 devaluation of the pound.

== Personal life ==
Michelmore married a nurse during the Second World War but they divorced in 1949.

On 4 March 1950 he married Jean Metcalfe, a BBC Light Programme announcer, who presented Family Favourites in London while he was presenting the Hamburg link in the programme for the British Forces Broadcasting Service. The two did not meet face to face for six months, but after meeting they were quickly engaged and married. Michelmore called it "love at first hearing". The marriage produced a daughter, actress Jenny Michelmore, and a son, broadcaster and composer Guy Michelmore, both of whom have children.

Michelmore resided during his later life in the West Sussex village of South Harting, having earlier, in the 1970s, lived at the foot of Reigate Hill, Reigate, Surrey, not far from Reigate railway station. He died at Petersfield Hospital in Hampshire on 16 March 2016, aged 96. Paying tribute, the Director-General of the BBC, Tony Hall, said: "It's impossible to overestimate just how important a national figure he was at a time when there were just two channels... He was natural, warm, engaging – he was utterly himself and showed he was one of us."

His body was buried in the graveyard of St Mary and St Gabriel Church in South Harting.
