= Jean Metcalfe =

English radio broadcaster

- Dundee Courier, 1953
- Born: 2 March 1923; Reigate, Surrey, England
- Died: 28 January 2000 (aged 76); Petersfield, Hampshire, England
- Occupation: Radio personality
- Spouse: Cliff Michelmore (m. 1950)
- Children: 2, including Guy

Jean Metcalfe (2 March 1923 – 28 January 2000) was an English radio broadcaster.

== Early life ==
Jean Metcalfe was the eldest child of Guy Vivian Metcalfe, a railway clerk with the Southern Railway at Waterloo station, and Gwendoline Annie, née Reed. Her family were a typical lower-middle-class family of the time. Their house had no bathroom and they used her father's Southern Railway privilege tickets to get them to their most ambitious holiday destination, Cornwall.

She excelled at elocution and art at the local county school, and formed a passionate love of the radio at home. She joined the Children's Hour radio circle, and entered competitions which entitled the winners to visit Broadcasting House, headquarters of the BBC. She excelled at school dramatics, and once played Queen Victoria.

== Career ==
Leaving school in 1939, Metcalfe went to secretarial college and then applied for a job at the BBC in 1940. By bending the truth on her CV, inventing grandparents in Norfolk and describing her father's occupation as a "welfare officer", she succeeded in getting a job with the variety department, being paid £2 5s. 6d. (£2.27 1/2) a week. Her first broadcast was on 21 May 1941, reading the poem "Spring, the Sweet Spring" by Thomas Ashe for the Empire Service programme Books and People.

== Forces Favourites ==
Metcalfe was auditioned as an announcer for the new BBC General Forces Programme, a joint BBC–War Office venture which was the BBC's first worldwide service and the first to use female announcers. She joined the BBC Africa Service, and began her long period with the programme that made her a household name: Forces Favourites, later renamed Family Favourites. This was a request programme in which members of the armed forces abroad, and their families at home, could ask the "compère" to play a favourite piece of music. She began the job after five hours of study with the programme's editor Margaret Hubble. She last presented the programme as a Christmas special on Radio 2 in 1985.

== Personal life ==
Whilst doing the programme from London, Metcalfe met her male colleague at the Hamburg end of the operation, Squadron Leader Cliff Michelmore. They married on 4 March 1950. By this time, the programme had changed its name to the peacetime Family Favourites. They had two children: actress Jenny Michelmore and the broadcaster and composer Guy Michelmore.

== Woman's Hour ==
From August 1950, Metcalfe presented Woman's Hour on the BBC Light Programme. At the time, the programme had a long list of forbidden topics. Self-effacing and gently spoken, she pioneered the art of interviewing stars in their own homes, including the wartime 'forces sweetheart' singer Vera Lynn, the irascible television personality Gilbert Harding, the song and dance man Frankie Vaughan and the stiff-upper-lipped film actor Kenneth More. The Daily Mail made her broadcasting personality of the year in 1955, and she won a Variety Club of Great Britain radio personality award in 1963. From the late 1950s to mid-1960s, she narrated various fairy tales and children's stories on 7" and LP, and in 1964 was featured alongside Michael Aspel on the Voice Improvement Programme LP published by Polydor.

== Later life ==
Metcalfe gave up broadcasting in 1967 to devote her time to her family and did not return full-time until 1971, when she presented If You Think You've Got Problems, a programme in which a broad range of human problems were discussed, many of which would not have been allowed to be aired when she began her association with Woman's Hour. The programme continued until 1979, although the BBC objected to one of her programmes, on lesbianism, as it would be going out on a Sunday.

On TV, she made her début with Robert Beatty in Saturday Night Out and did guest spots for Juke Box Jury and BBC daytime magazines Wednesday Magazine and Family Affairs. She wrote and illustrated Sunnylea: A 1920s Childhood Remembered (1980) and wrote a joint autobiography with her husband, Two-Way Story (1986).

== Death ==
In retirement, Metcalfe lived with her husband in the West Sussex village of South Harting. She died in 2000, and her body was buried in the graveyard of the church of Saint Mary & Saint Gabriel in South Harting.
