= Skues =

Skues is a surname. Notable people with the surname include:

- G. E. M. Skues (1858–1949), British lawyer, writer and fly fisherman
- Keith Skues (born 1939), British radio personality
