= Eyewitness Books =

Series of nonfiction books published by Dorling Kindersley

Eyewitness Books (called Eyewitness Guides in the UK) is a series of educational nonfiction books. They were first published in Great Britain by Dorling Kindersley in 1988. The series now has over 160 titles on a variety of subjects, such as dinosaurs, Ancient Egypt, flags, chemistry, music, the Solar System, film, and William Shakespeare. According to Dorling Kindersley, over 50 million copies have been sold in 36 languages.

The books are often noted for their numerous photographs and detailed illustrations, which are always set against a white background. Describing the series in Booklist, Michael Cart wrote, "What DK did—with almost revolutionary panache—was essentially to reinvent nonfiction books by breaking up the solid pages of grey type that had previously been their hallmark, reducing the text to bite-size, nonlinear nuggets that were then surrounded by pictures that did more than adorn—they also conveyed information. Usually full colour, they were so crisply reproduced they 'seemed to leap off the page.'"

All 160 titles were later adapted into a television series, with theme music composed by Guy Michelmore.

== List of books in the series ==
The series includes:

- Africa
- The Amazon
- American Football (US title: Football)
- American Revolution
- Amphibian
- Ancient Civilizations
- Ancient Egypt
- Ancient Greece
- Ancient Iraq (US title: Mesopotamia)
- Ancient Rome
- Animal
- Archaeology
- Arctic & Antarctic
- Arms & Armour (US title: Arms & Armor)
- Astronomy†
- Aztec (US title: Aztec, Inca & Maya)
- Baseball
- Basketball
- Battle
- Bible Lands
- Bird
- Boat
- Buddhism
- Building
- Butterfly & Moth
- Car
- Castle
- Cat
- Chemistry†
- Chicago
- China (US title: Ancient China)
- Christianity
- Cinema (US title: Film)
- City
- Civil War
- Climate Change
- Computer
- Costume
- Cowboy
- Crime & Detection
- Crystal & Gem
- Dance
- Desert
- Dinosaur
- Dog
- Eagle (US title: Eagle & Birds of Prey)
- Early People (US title: Early Humans)
- Earth†
- Ecology†
- Economy
- Electricity†
- Electronics†
- Elephant
- Endangered Animals
- Energy†
- Epidemic
- Everest
- Evolution†
- Explorer
- Farm
- First Ladies
- Fish
- Flag
- Flying Machine (later Flight)
- Food
- Football (US title: Soccer)
- Force & Motion†
- Forensic Science
- Fossil
- Future
- Gandhi
- Gorilla (US title: Gorilla, Monkey, & Ape)
- Goya‡
- Great Musicians
- Great Scientists
- Horse
- Human Body†
- Hurricane & Tornado
- Impressionism‡
- Index to the Eyewitness Guides
- India
- Insect
- Invention
- Islam
- Judaism
- Jungle
- Knight
- Leonardo (US title: Leonardo & His Times, later Da Vinci & His Times)
- Life†
- Light†
- Mammal
- Manet‡
- Mars
- Matter†
- Media & Communication
- Medicine†
- Medieval Life
- Modern China (US title: China)
- Monet‡
- Money
- Moon
- Mummy
- Music
- Mythology
- NASCAR
- National Parks
- Natural Disasters
- North American Indian
- Ocean
- Oil
- Olympics
- Periodic Table (US title: The Elements)
- Perspective‡
- Photography
- Pirate
- Planets
- Plant
- Pond & River
- Predator
- Prehistoric Life
- Presidents
- Pyramid
- Religion
- Renaissance‡
- Reptile
- Rescue
- Robot
- Rocks & Minerals
- Russia
- Science
- Seashore
- Shakespeare
- Shark
- Shell
- Shipwreck
- Skeleton
- Soldier
- Space Exploration
- Sport (US title: Sports)
- Spy
- Submarine
- Super Bowl
- Technology†
- Texas
- Time & Space†
- Titanic
- Train
- Transportation
- Treasure
- Tree
- Tudor
- Universe
- Van Gogh‡
- Victorians
- Vietnam War
- Viking
- Volcano (US title: Volcano & Earthquake)
- Vote
- Water
- Watercolour‡ (US title: Watercolor‡)
- Weather
- Whale
- Wild West
- Witch & Wizard (US title: Witches & Magic-Makers)
- Wonders of the World
- World Series
- World War I
- World War II
- Writing (US title: Book)

† originally published as part of the Eyewitness Science series.

‡ originally published as part of the Eyewitness Art series.

== Other series ==
Dorling Kindersley also produced a number of other book series under the Eyewitness banner:

- Eyewitness Anthologies: 3-in-1 compilations centred around a common theme – Ancient Civilizations, Ancient Egyptians, American Peoples, Knights & Castles, Rocks, Fossils & Gems, and Sharks, Whales & Dolphins. Later expanded to 6-in-1 compilations – Animal Kingdom, Living World, and Science Explorer.
- Eyewitness Art: 14 titles published between 1992 and 1995. 8 titles were republished as part of the main Books/Guides series in 1998; the remaining books which weren't were - Colour, Composition, Gauguin, Looking at Paintings, Post-Impressionism, and Sculpture.
- Eyewitness Companions
- Eyewitness Explorers
- Eyewitness Project Books
- Eyewitness Project Pack
- Eyewitness Science: 16 titles published between 1992 and 1995. They were republished as part of the main Books/Guides series in 1998.
- Eyewitness Travel Guides: They are known for their photography and illustrated city street plans. Places covered by Eyewitness Travel Guides include Philadelphia paired with the Pennsylvania Dutch Country, California, Florida, the Southern United States, New England, Germany, Tokyo, Hawaii, Sweden, Alaska, New Orleans, Paris, India, Arizona and the Grand Canyon, Canada, Great Britain, Las Vegas, Washington, D.C., Chicago, China, Malaysia, Mexico, Singapore, Kenya and many others.
- Eyewitness Visual Dictionaries
- Eyewitness Workbooks
- Pocket Eyewitness
- Smithsonian Eyewitness Explorer
- The Eyewitness Atlas of the World

In addition to the book series DK also produced several tie-in ranges:

- Eyewitness Kits
- Eyewitness Software
- Eyewitness TV

== See also ==
- Eyewitness, the British TV series based on the books
- DK, publisher of the book series
