= Joy Nichols =

Australian actor, singer and comedian (1925–1992)

- Joy Nicholls, Sydney, 28 September 1942
- Born: Joy Eileen Nichols; 17 February 1925; Sydney, New South Wales, Australia
- Died: 23 June 1992 (aged 67); New York City, New York, USA
- Occupations: Actor, singer, comedian
- Spouses: Harry Jerome Dickel (m. 1944) Wally Peterson (m. 1949)

Joy Eileen Nichols (17 February 1925 – 23 June 1992) was an Australian-British comedian, actress and singer who also worked in the United States. She was best known as one of the stars of Take It From Here on BBC Radio.

== Biography ==
Nichols, born in Sydney, Australia, was originally part of a song-and-dance double act with her brother George. She made her first radio broadcast aged seven, when she appeared in a production of Charles Dickens' A Christmas Carol. As well as working on stage, she appeared on shows for the Australian Broadcasting Commission and commercial radio: for the latter, she compered Lever Colgate's The Youth Show. Her weekly four-minute slot had her performing both drama and comedy. She also had her own series, Joy Nichols Presents. In 1946, Nichols acted in the Australian adventure film Smithy. She married Harry Jerome Dickel in 1944 in Sydney.

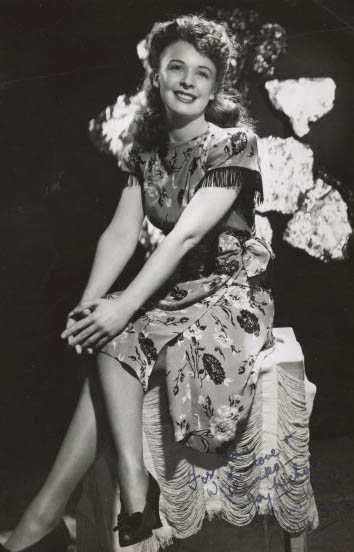
Joy Nichols during the Tivoli revue of Follow the Girls, Sydney, May 1948

Nichols moved to Britain in 1946 to further her career. Radio producer Charles Maxwell gave her a major role in the last series of Navy Mixture, broadcast for the BBC General Forces Programme in 1947, in which she starred with Jimmy Edwards. Guest appearances by fellow Australian Dick Bentley led to the pairing of Bentley's writer Denis Norden with Edwards and Nichols' writer Frank Muir on Take It From Here (1948–1960), starring Edwards, Bentley and Nichols, who both sang and played comedy.

In 1949, Nichols married Wally Peterson, an American musical comedy performer who was then touring in the London production of Oklahoma!. November that year saw Nichols appearing in the Royal Command Variety Performance. In 1950 and 1951, she took part in Take It From Us, a stage production in London and Blackpool. By January 1951, however, Nichols was complaining of being overworked, and expressed a wish to go back to Australia. The following year, she temporarily left Take It From Here to give birth to a daughter, Roberta. In 1952, she topped bills at Moss Empire theatres, and appeared in her second Royal Command Variety Performance. The following spring, she represented Australia in the BBC Television show Dominion's Salute, as part of their Coronation tribute. She then left England for commitments in Australia, where broadcasts of Take it From Here had increased her fame.

In 1953, Nichols recorded the novelty song "Little Red Monkey" by Stephen Gale and Jack Jordan with Jimmy Edwards and Dick Bentley. This was played many times in the 1950s and early 60s on the BBC's radio request programme Children's Favourites. Nichols departed her role in Take it From Here for good in 1953, and was replaced in her comedy role by June Whitfield and as a singer, Alma Cogan, just as the show took off with the appearance of The Glums. Nichols returned with her husband to the United States.

Nichols was back in London in 1955 to appear in the West End production of The Pajama Game, alongside Edmund Hockridge, Max Wall and Arthur Lowe at the Coliseum theatre. In 1957, she appeared in Charlie Chaplin's A King in New York as a nightclub vocalist, singing Chaplin's composition "Now That It's Ended".

She appeared in Fiorello!, which opened in New York in November 1959. She had supporting roles in a number of Broadway musicals in the 1950s and 1960s, including Redhead and Darling of the Day, but was unable to secure lead roles and finally left show business after a failed attempt at resuming her career in England. Latterly, she worked as a retail assistant.

Nichols and her husband divorced in the mid-1970s, though they remained on good terms towards the end of her life. She died in New York on 23 June 1992, aged 67.

== Filmography ==
Year	Title	Role	Notes
1942	A Yank in Australia		
1946	Smithy	Kay Sutton	
1956	Not So Dusty	Lobelia	
1957	A King in New York	Singer	

== Radio ==
- Dead Timber (1946)
