= Easy Beat (radio programme) =

Easy Beat is a BBC Radio programme broadcast nationally in the United Kingdom on the Light Programme on Sunday mornings, between January 1960 and September 1967. It was one of the earliest BBC programmes to broadcast pop music. Like the contemporary Saturday Club, it was initially presented by Brian Matthew, later by Keith Fordyce and, finally, David Symonds. Both Matthew and Fordyce would later go on to host the long-running Sounds of the 60s, on the Light Programme's successor, BBC Radio 2.

It was scheduled between 10:30 - 11:30 on Sunday mornings, and regularly featured Kenny Ball's Jazzmen, and recorded sessions by featured guests in front of a studio audience. The Beatles appeared on four Easy Beat shows in 1963:

7 April 1963: performing "Please Please Me", "Misery", and "From Me to You"
23 June 1963: performing "Some Other Guy", "A Taste Of Honey", "Thank You Girl" and "From Me to You"
21 July 1963: performing "I Saw Her Standing There", "A Shot of Rhythm and Blues", "There's a Place" and "Twist and Shout"
20 October 1963: performing "I Saw Her Standing There", "Love Me Do", "Please Please Me", "From Me To You" and "She Loves You".

When Radio 1 started in 1967, the show continued for several months under the title Happening Sunday and introduced by Ed Stewart, before being dropped.
