= David Dunhill =

English radio announcer

- Born: David Penrose Dunhill; 1 March 1917; London, England
- Died: 20 March 2005 (aged 88)
- Occupation: Radio announcer
- Employer: BBC
- Spouse: Barbara (m. 1947; death 2005)
- Children: 4
- Father: Thomas Dunhill

David Penrose Dunhill (1 March 1917 – 20 March 2005) was an English radio announcer for the BBC. He began his career as a staff reporter at the Swindon Evening Advertiser before joining the Royal Air Force in North Africa when the Second World War broke out. Dunhill joined the BBC as a staff announcer and newspaper on the BBC Light Programme and was resident announcer of the radio comedy programme Take It from Here. He became a continuity announcer at the BBC Home Service and the BBC Third Programme and was the final man to be heard on the Home Service in 1967. Dunhill turned to freelance work, providing coaching to radio and television broadcasters, reporters and presenters.

== Early life ==
Dunhill was born in London on 1 March 1917, and was one of three children. His father, Thomas Dunhill, was an composer, and his mother was Molly Arnold, who died of tuberculosis when David was 12. Dunhill had an upper class upbringing, being raised for the most part by nannys. He was educated at Mowden Preparatory School in Brighton and Wellington College. After leaving school, he joined the Dunhill firm in Paris, but left to do a course at the London School of Journalism.

== Career ==
Dunhill found his first employment following the completion of his training as a staff reporter for the Swindon Evening Advertiser. When the Second World War broke out, he joined the Royal Air Force and volunteered to travel to the Middle East where he worked as a clerk with a mobile garage unit going back and forth across North Africa in places such as Tripoli, rising to the rank of corporal. There, Dunhill received an invitation to join the Forces Broadcasting Service in Cairo, working as an announcer. He also did work at the Tripoli Times, as an news reader at the Egyptian State Broadcasting, and was an assistant to the editor of the World Press Review, a weekly Cairo-based combined service paper.

Following the war, Dunhill joined the BBC in 1946. He was a staff announcer and newspaper on the BBC Light Programme, as a contemporary of Alvar Lidell, Ronald Fletcher, Stuart Hibberd, John Snagge, Robert Dougall and Jack de Manio. Dunhill was later selected to be the resident announcer of the popular radio comedy programme Take It from Here. He was the compere of the programmes Family Favourites, the one-hour series Sunday in Summer (from July 1953) and The Eye Witness. Following an interval from broadcasting during which he worked at the BBC's personnel department, Dunhill became a continuity announcer at the BBC Home Service and the BBC Third Programme. In 1967, Dunhill was the final man to be heard on the BBC Home Service before it was replaced by BBC Radio 4.

In his fifties, he became a freelancer. Dunhill travelled the United Kingdom and taught elocution to local radio and television broadcasters, reporters and presenters during the 1970s and the 1980s. His pupils included the likes of Jill Dando, Libby Purves and Jon Snow. Dunhill and his wife participated in an 1970s edition of the BBC's Panorama programme in which discussions took place on how it could be possible for a marriage between a bisexual person and his heterosexual to be successful. He was the scriptwriter of the Son et lumière programme that was staged at Bristol Cathedral and Winchester Cathedral in 1973 and 1974, among others. Dunhill was featured on an BBC Radio 4 programme called The New Recruit in 1993. He was an gay and bisexual rights campaigner. Dunhill was an active member of the Gay Christian Movement and helped to support other gays, lesbians and bisexuals during his life. In 1997, he published a biography of his father, Thomas Dunhill: Maker of Music, and authored Good-Bi Songs, a collection of verse. Dunhill was a playwright and authored poems and letters.

== Personal life ==
He married his wife Barbara in 1947. They had four children, two of whom were twins. Dunhill died on 20 March 2005.
