= Merry-Go-Round (radio programme) =

Merry-Go-Round, also known as Mediterranean Merry-Go-Round and Middle East Merry-Go-Round, is a BBC comedy-variety radio show introduced as entertainment for British troops during World War II. It led to several spin-offs, such as Much-Binding-in-the-Marsh, Waterlogged Spa and Puffney Post Office. It provided the first major role for Jon Pertwee, who would later star in The Navy Lark and as the Third Doctor in Doctor Who.

== See also ==
- BBC General Forces Programme
- BBC Light Programme
