= Saturday Club (BBC Radio) =

- Country of origin: United Kingdom
- Home station: BBC Light Programme (1957–1967); BBC Radio 1 (1967–1969)
- Hosted by: Brian Matthew (1957–1965); Ray Orchard (1965–1967); Keith Skues (1967–1969)
- Original release: 1 June 1957 – 18 January 1969
- Opening theme: "Saturday Jump" by Humphrey Lyttelton and his band

Saturday Club is a BBC Radio programme in the United Kingdom, broadcast on the BBC Light Programme and later BBC Radio 1 between 1957 and 1969. It was one of the earliest – and for several years almost the only – radio programme in the country to broadcast pop music. Its longest-serving host was Brian Matthew.

== Saturday Skiffle Club ==
The programme began after a suggestion by producer Jimmy Grant. He initially proposed a modest series called Skiffle Session, featuring two or three singers with a skiffle group. At first, BBC management was unsure that there should be a radio show specifically for teenagers, but auditions were held for musicians including Chas McDevitt, and a weekly programme was agreed. As Saturday Skiffle Club, it was first broadcast on 1 June 1957. It had a budget of £55 per week, and newsreader Brian Matthew as an announcer. Cliff Richard failed an audition for the programme and was not used, but early regular performers included McDevitt, the Vipers Skiffle Group, Johnny Duncan and his Bluegrass Boys, and George Melly and his Bubbling Over Four. The budget was increased on occasions when Lonnie Donegan, the top skiffle star of the time, performed. Although the experimental programme was successful, management was concerned about the high proportion of American songs performed, and also about the use of songs with religious themes.

== The early years of Saturday Club ==
In October 1958, the programme was extended to two hours, from 10 am to 12 noon on Saturday mornings. The word "skiffle" was dropped from the title, its budget was increased, and a wider range of performers began to appear. These included Cliff Richard, Adam Faith, Chris Barber, Humphrey Lyttelton, Marty Wilde, Terry Dene, Vince Taylor, Russ Sainty, Johnny Kidd, Michael Holliday, Bert Weedon and Clinton Ford. Brian Matthew relaxed his style, and often started the show saying "Hello my ole mateys." The show consisted mainly of pre-recorded "live" performances, because of "needle time" restrictions on the number of records that could be played by the BBC. Most programmes had four live acts and only contained around six record requests and three new releases. The theme music was "Saturday Jump", which was written by Jimmy Grant (under his pseudonym of Eddie James) and performed by Ted Heath.

By August 1959 Saturday Club had a regular audience of five million listeners, including many children, as the programme immediately followed Children's Favourites. It soon began featuring performances from touring American artists including Eddie Cochran, Gene Vincent, Duane Eddy and Bobby Darin, after a Musicians' Union ban on performances by non-British musicians ended. Other American performers followed, including The Everly Brothers, Jerry Lee Lewis, Bo Diddley, Chris Montez and Tommy Roe. In 1960, an LP, Saturday Club, was issued, on the Parlophone label, featuring 13 performers including Tommy Bruce, Ricky Valance, Keith Kelly, Bert Weedon and the King Brothers.

== The Beatles on Saturday Club ==
The fifth-anniversary show in October 1963 starred the Beatles, The Everly Brothers, Tommy Roe, Frank Ifield, Kathy Kirby, Clinton Ford, Roy Orbison, Joe Brown and his Bruvvers, Kenny Ball's Jazzmen and Arthur Greenslade's group with strings. The producer, Bernie Andrews, spent £483.12.6d on the performers. The Beatles received 50 guineas (£52 10s.).

In all, the Beatles appeared on the programme ten times. They first appeared on 26 January 1963, two weeks after the release of "Please Please Me", when they performed "Some Other Guy", "Love Me Do", "Please Please Me", "Keep Your Hands Off My Baby" and "Beautiful Dreamer". Their other appearances were on 16 March, 25 May, 29 June, 24 August, 5 October, and 21 December 1963; 15 February, 4 April, and, finally, 26 December 1964.

== Later years ==
By 1965, Brian Matthew, who had also begun a Sunday morning programme, Easy Beat, had been replaced as host by Ray Orchard. The programme’s status was somewhat diminished by the advent of Radio 1 in 1967, although the BBC did keep it going for just over a year with Keith Skues as host. Matthew has described how he was shunned by the BBC around this time, although he was to find other outlets with the Corporation and presented Sounds of the 60s on Saturday mornings on Radio 2 for over 25 years in the late 1990s and early 21st century.

The first Radio 1 Saturday Club on 30 September 1967 featured the Bee Gees and Dave Dee, Dozy, Beaky, Mick & Tich, and other editions included Dusty Springfield, Wayne Fontana, the Searchers, Jimi Hendrix, Manfred Mann, Small Faces, Cream and the Who. The show completed 500 editions on 4 May 1968, but was axed on 18 January 1969.

== Recorded legacy ==
Sessions recorded for Saturday Club by Chas McDevitt, The Everly Brothers, Eddie Cochran, Gene Vincent, Johnny Kidd, Billy Fury, Dusty Springfield, Marianne Faithfull, Small Faces, Cream, Harry Nilsson and the Who have been released on CD.

== Episode guide ==
- Saturday Club at epguides.com
