= Philip Jones (producer) =

Television producer

- Jones in 1972
- Born: December 7, 1927
- Died: May 7, 2004 (aged 76)
- Occupations: Radio and television producer

Philip Stuart Jones OBE (7 December 1927 – 7 May 2004) was a radio and television producer. He is best remembered for his period as Head of Light Entertainment at Thames Television, after he had worked in the same role at ABC. Jones was responsible for bringing Benny Hill to Thames in 1969 resulting in the comedian's internationally successful series of programmes.

== Early life ==
Jones was born in 1927 in Cheltenham. His father was Head of Languages at Cheltenham Grammar School, where he was educated. He did National Service in the Royal Air Force from 1946 to 1948 and then began his media career at Radio Luxembourg as programme assistant, working on its magazine 208 and the show Quiz Time. By the end of his six years at the station he was programme controller. In 1953, he left to start his career in television, freelancing initially and then joining Granada in 1956 as a trainee.

== Later career ==
He joined Tyne Tees, a franchise contractor for ITV around 1958, the year before the station first began to broadcast, as a producer/director in Light Entertainment. Jones joined ABC in 1960, having been approached by the company's managing director Howard Thomas and given a brief to broaden the station's music output. Jones was the producer of ABC's Thank Your Lucky Stars. He booked The Beatles to appear on the show on 19 January 1963, shortly after the release of "Please Please Me". The show was broadcast during a snowstorm and so had an unusually high teenage audience in the total audience of about six million viewers helping to break the record. Six months afterwards, The Rolling Stones made their first appearance on British television on Thank Your Lucky Stars. The series ran for five years. In 1965, Jones became Head of Light Entertainment at ABC.

After ABC lost its franchise in 1968, Jones continued as head of light entertainment at Thames, supervising many successful situation comedy series and entertainers and comedians under contract to the station. Jones signed Benny Hill, previously with the BBC, to Thames in 1969. Hill's contract with Thames lasted for 20 years, his shows being broadcast internationally and the series becoming the company's most successful in overseas sales. Jones persuaded Morecambe and Wise to leave the BBC for Thames in 1978. Jones retired from his post at Thames in 1988. For a decade from 1992, Jones was the executive producer of As Time Goes By.

Jones was appointed an OBE in 1978. He died from cancer in 2004.
