= Charles Maxwell (radio producer) =

British radio producer (1910–1998)

Charles Chalmers Maxwell (1 September 1910 – 4 August 1998) was a British radio producer who produced shows for the BBC such as Take It From Here and brought together the scriptwriting partnership of Frank Muir and Denis Norden. Later in his career he commissioned the long running series I'm Sorry, I'll Read That Again.

== Early life ==
Maxwell was born in Fife, Scotland and after attending Edinburgh Academy went to university to study law and qualified as a solicitor. However he soon abandoned the law for a career in show business.

== Independent radio career ==
In 1936 Maxwell joined Radio Luxembourg as a station announcer. One of his jobs was to read out commentary on English Test cricket. The script was written in London and was telephoned through to broadcaster Roy Plomley who was working at another commercial station, Radio Normandy, Plomley then telephoned it through to Maxwell for him to broadcast. As Plomley recalled "As neither Charles nor I had the least knowledge of, or interest in, cricket, it was a laborious process." After a period with Radio Luxembourg, Maxwell moved to Radio Normandy before returning to Britain in 1938 to work for Radio Normandy's parent company, the International Broadcasting Company (IBC). With the outbreak of the Second World War, IBC set up Radio International Fécamp and Maxwell worked as one of the presenters until the station went off the air in January 1940.

== BBC career ==
After brief service in the Royal Air Force, Maxwell joined the BBC, an association that would continue until 1970. Joining the BBC Forces Programme (later the BBC General Forces Programme) as a variety producer where he produced a number of programmes, the most notable being Navy Mixture which ran from 1943 until 1947.

One of the scriptwriters for Navy Mixture was Frank Muir and when Maxwell was approached to produce a new show for the stars of the show he persuaded Muir to be the writer. Muir felt that the load would be too much for one person and suggested Denis Norden might be a suitable co-writer. Maxwell agreed and one of the longest script-writing partnerships in radio (and later television) was formed. The resulting programme was Take It From Here which ran for 13 seasons with Maxwell producing them all.

Maxwell also produced the BBC Variety special for the Festival of Britain broadcast in May 1951 starring Danny Kaye and Gracie Fields.

In 1966 Maxwell was appointed as Chief Producer of Light Entertainment at BBC Radio 4 and was the commissioning producer for another long running series, I'm Sorry, I'll Read That Again, that launched the careers of people like John Cleese, Graeme Garden, Bill Oddie and Tim Brooke-Taylor.

Maxwell retired from the BBC in 1970 and died in August 1998. Shortly before his death, in June 1998, he shared his reminiscences of the early career of Frank Muir, who died earlier in the year, on BBC Radio 4's Frank Muir-a Kentish Lad Remembered.
