= Sounds of the 60s =

BBC Radio 2 programme

- Genre: 1960s music
- Running time: 120 minutes
- Country of origin: United Kingdom
- Language: English
- Home station: BBC Radio 2
- Hosted by: Keith Fordyce (1983–1985); Various (1985–1988); Simon Dee (1988–1989); Brian Matthew (1990–2017); Tony Blackburn (2017–present)
- Produced by: Mollie Davidson, compiled by Tony Blackburn
- Recording studio: Broadcasting House, London (1983–2006, 2024–present); Wogan House, London (2006–2024)
- Original release: 12 February 1983
- Audio format: FM, DAB digital radio, TV and online
- Ending theme: "Foot Tapper" by the Shadows (1983–2017)
- Website: Official website

Sounds of the 60s is a long-running Saturday morning programme on BBC Radio 2 that features recordings of popular music made in the 1960s. It was first broadcast on 12 February 1983 and introduced by Keith Fordyce, who had been the first presenter of the TV show Ready Steady Go! in 1963. From March 1990 until February 2017, the presenter was Brian Matthew. Tony Blackburn has hosted the show since 4 March 2017.

== Presenters ==
In the mid 1980s, the format changed and each week the programme was presented by a different artist from the 1960s. Many famous names were involved, including: Alvin Stardust, Eddy Grant, Herb Alpert, Graham Nash, Frankie Valli, Bob Gaudio, Tom Jones, Neil Sedaka, Donovan, Mike Stoller, Bruce Welch, Duane Eddy, Bill Medley, Roy Wood, Mike Berry, David Crosby and many more. "I Love SOTS" car stickers were given free to listeners.

In 1987, the then producer Stuart Hobday re-discovered Simon Dee, the first voice heard on Radio Caroline in 1964, and persuaded him to present a listeners' all-time-favourite Top 20 which was broadcast on Boxing Day 1987. The response from the public was so great that Dee was initially asked to host the show as a guest presenter, before being booked for a four-month run from April until July 1988. His success led him to take over the show on a permanent basis in September 1988, but this only lasted six months and it came to an end in March 1989. Dee's constant demands for the show to be broadcast live and to move from Bristol to London, along with a growing list of complaints to BBC management, meant that his contract was not renewed.

Subsequently Brian Matthew, who had introduced Saturday Club on the BBC Light Programme, later BBC Radio 1, until 1969, took over as regular presenter.

=== Brian Matthew ===
Matthew first presented Sounds of the 60s on 31 March 1990, following the end of his stint on Round Midnight and was still doing so until November 2016, more than 26 years after he took over. His place was taken temporarily between September 2006 and February 2007, during periods of illness, by former Radio Caroline and BBC Radio 1 disc jockey Johnnie Walker (and, during Walker's own absence in December 2006, by three guest presenters: Sandie Shaw, Joe Brown and Suzi Quatro). Matthew returned on 10 February 2007, revealing that his prolonged absence had been due to a viral infection contracted while in hospital for a routine operation. Matthew was also absent due to illness in October 2011 and November 2016 – February 2017, with lyricist Tim Rice replacing him on both occasions. A Sounds of the 60s CD was released in November 2011. On 28 March 2015, Matthew presented a 25th anniversary show. In it, he selected ten of his favourite songs of the 1960s and there were tributes from Ray Davies, Helen Shapiro, Paul Jones, Marty Wilde and Petula Clark. On 27 January 2017, the BBC announced that Matthew would be retiring from presenting the show, due to ill health. In February 2017, it was announced that Tony Blackburn would be taking over the show from March that year.

== Features of the show ==
Matthew made the programme very much his own and turned it into something of a cult, one aspect being its very own slang: "SOTS" (acronym of the title); "avids" (listeners); "the Vocalist" (the show's producer, Roger Bowman and, later, Phil Swern, the Collector). Under Matthew, the two-hour programme was divided into one-hour "sides" (called Side 1 and Side 2) and the names of those listeners whose requests were to be played used to be announced at the start of each "side"; now the names of the artists requested are announced instead. There were also well-researched features, such as an "A to Z of the Beatles" (recordings of which were repeated during the shows from which Matthew was absent, to maintain his presence in the programme) and initially "SOTS" T-shirts for listeners whose record requests were played. Later, "SOTS" baseball caps and "SOTS" sweatshirts were given to successful requesters, but this practice ceased in 2009. Although the playlist was almost entirely restricted to music recorded in the 1960s, so-called "roots records" from the 1950s were also featured, while recordings from earlier decades that re-entered the charts in the 1960s were also eligible. Its theme tune from the inception of the show until the end of the Matthew era was the 1963 instrumental "Foot Tapper" by the Shadows. Its final appearance as the show's closing theme was on 15 April 2017, when Matthew's successor, Tony Blackburn, played it in tribute following Matthew's death the previous week.

From 2007 to his death in 2024, the show's producer was Phil Swern, whom Matthew had nicknamed "The Collector", joined in 2017 by Tom Du Croz. Mollie Davidson and Tony Blackburn now compile and produce the show.

It was during Swern's time on the show that the "Playing Hard to Get" feature was introduced into the Matthew era of the show. Listeners who wanted a copy of a record they had lost over the years could request a CD of that song and, if successful, were sent a special "SOTS" CD of the track after it had been played on the show. When Matthew left the show, requests were dropped.

Tony Blackburn has been hosting the show since 4 March 2017. The show is currently broadcast live between 6am and 8am on Saturdays. New features of the show have included "America's Top 3", "Magic Moments", "60s into the 70s", the "A-Z of Motown", "Tony's Doo-Wop Shop", "Northern Soul Dancefloor Fillers", "Stuck on Two", "Classic EPs" and "Phil Swern's Colossal Collection".

During an early part of the COVID-19 pandemic, the show temporarily returned to being pre-recorded, with Blackburn recording it from his home in, as he put it, “the Hertfordshire countryside”. During this time, Blackburn changed the format of the show, with more listener requests being played.

On 10 April 2021, Sounds of the 60s was cancelled due to the death of Prince Philip, Duke of Edinburgh, the previous day. The show returned live on 24 April 2021.

== Related shows ==
For several years in the 1990s and a couple of years in the 2010s, Radio 2 carried a complementary show of music from the 1950s, Sounds of the 50s, which was presented by singer and entertainer Ronnie Hilton and later by Leo Green. Since the 2000s, there has also been Sounds of the 70s, a title first used in 1970 for a daily late-night show of "progressive" music on Radio 1. Radio 2's version of Sounds of the 70s was presented by singer-songwriter Steve Harley, Radio DJ Johnnie Walker, and now by Bob Harris. Sounds of the 80s was launched on Radio 2 on 5 October 2013, was presented by Sara Cox and now by Gary Davies. Sounds of the 90s was launched on 19 March 2020 and is presented by Fearne Cotton.

=== Other similar series (BBC Television) ===
A number of series have been made under the Sounds of... name for BBC Television, which mix performances from the BBC's music archives with clips from various decades. Sounds of the Sixties was first broadcast on BBC2 on 5 October 1991, with an episode called "The First Steps", which featured performances from acts such as the Beatles, Gerry and the Pacemakers and the Rolling Stones, along with puppets Pinky and Perky doing the twist. Due to the nature of the BBC's 1960s Top of the Pops archive, the series compiled each episode from a wide range of BBC programmes such as cutting-edge pop show The Beat Room and children's programmes like Blue Peter and Crackerjack!

Sounds of the Seventies followed on from Sounds of the Sixties in 1993, with a second series of ten programmes called Sounds of the 70s 2 made in 2012. On 12 January 1996, an eight-part series called Sounds of the Eighties was first shown by BBC2, with the first episode featuring Duran Duran, Culture Club, ABC, Bananarama and Kylie Minogue. All these four series have been repeated many times on BBC Four, with the programmes also being used by UKTV's Yesterday channel as part of their Saturday night music programming block.
