= Guy Michelmore =

British composer and news presenter

- Born: Guy Alford Michelmore; August 1957 (age 69)
- Education: St John's School, Leatherhead
- Alma mater: Pembroke College, Oxford
- Occupations: Film and television composer, television news presenter
- Employer: BBC
- Notable work: Eyewitness; About Anglia; Newsroom South East
- Parents: Cliff Michelmore (father); Jean Metcalfe (mother)
- Website: guymichelmore.com

Guy Alford Michelmore (born August 1957) is an English film and television composer and former television news presenter.

== Early life ==
Guy Alford Michelmore was born in August 1957. Michelmore is the son of BBC presenters Cliff Michelmore and Jean Metcalfe. His mother Jean was the presenter of Family Favourites and Woman's Hour. His father Cliff was best known for the BBC television programme Tonight. Cliff once interviewed himself, and asked whether either his son or daughter had shown any interest in television – Cliff answered by saying that ten-year-old Guy was "at that point where he is fascinated and interested in all things... even his father's job!"

Michelmore was educated at the independent St John's School in Leatherhead, Surrey and Pembroke College, Oxford.

== News presenter ==
Michelmore began reporting on Anglia TV's About Anglia before joining the BBC programme Newsroom South East in 1993. He left the programme to be replaced by Tim Ewart from ITN.

Michelmore famously spilt his drink all over himself and his desk before going into a live link on Newsroom South East. The incident was shown on the BBC's Auntie's Bloomers outtakes show.

== Composer ==
Michelmore is a composer of music for film and television. He is best known for his work with Eyewitness composing the main theme; and for Marvel which includes eight animated feature films and a number of TV series, including Avengers: Earth's Mightiest Heroes, Iron Man: Armoured Adventures and The Super Hero Squad Show. He scored the puppet feature film Jackboots on Whitehall in 2010. His other work includes The Jungle Book, Growing Up Creepie, for which he received an Annie Award nomination, and scores for Emmy Award winner Tutenstein, The Woodlies and The DaVincibles, among others. He worked extensively scoring natural history films and was nominated for an Emmy Award for his score to "The Queen of Trees" for the Nature series on PBS.

== Selected filmography ==
=== Film ===
- Thor: Tales of Asgard – 2011 direct-to-video animated film
- The Commuter – 2010 short film
- Jackboots on Whitehall – 2010 puppet film
- Planet Hulk – 2010 direct-to-video animated film
- Beyond the Pole – 2009 film
- Hulk Vs – 2009 direct-to-video animated release
- Next Avengers: Heroes of Tomorrow – 2008 direct-to-video animated film
- Doctor Strange: The Sorcerer Supreme – 2007 direct-to-video animated film
- The Invincible Iron Man – 2007 direct-to-video animated film
- Ultimate Avengers – 2006 direct-to-video animated film
- Ultimate Avengers 2 – 2006 direct-to-video animated film
- Voices Inside – 2005 short film
- Frozen – 2005 film
- Mavis and the Mermaid – 2004 short film
- Flyfishing – 2002 film
- Hellion – 2001 short film
- Distant Shadow – 2000 film
- The Killing Zone – 1999 film
- Dead Clean – 1998 short film
- Phoenix – 1997 short film

=== Television ===
- The Woodlies – 2012 animated TV series
- The DaVincibles – 2011 animated TV series
- The Avengers: Earth's Mightiest Heroes – 2010 animated TV series
- The Jungle Book – 2010 animated TV series
- Iron Man: Armored Adventures – 2009 animated TV series
- The Super Hero Squad Show – 2009 animated TV series
- Me, Robot – 2009 Cosmic Quantum Ray animated TV episode
- A Martian Christmas – 2008 animated TV film
- Growing Up Creepie – 2006 animated TV series
- The Queen of Trees – 2005 Natural World (2006 Nature) TV episode
- Roman Vice – 2005 TV film
- Time Machine – 2004 TV series
- Di's Guys – 2004 TV mini-series
- Tutenstein – 2003 animated TV series
- Cousins – 2000 TV series
- Tale of the Tides: The Hyaena and the Mudskipper – 1998 TV film
- Africa's Paradise of Thorns – 1997 TV film
- Robin Hood: Outlaw of the Forest – 1995 Biography TV episode
- Eyewitness – 1994 TV series
- The Human Animal – 1994 TV series

== Training courses ==
Michelmore is CEO and founding member of the online education provider ThinkSpace Education, which trains composers for jobs in music for visual media. ThinkSpace Education was the world's first online postgraduate degree provider in composition for film, games and television.

ThinkSpace Education's YouTube channel is hosted by Michelmore, where he performs scoring demonstrations and teaches compositional techniques.
