= Wally Peterson =

- Born: Francis Doyle; October 11, 1917; Boston, Massachusetts, US
- Died: March 30, 2011 (aged 93); New York City, New York, US
- Other name: Walter Edward Peterson
- Occupations: Actor singer stage manager songwriter
- Spouse: Joy Nichols

Wally Peterson (October 11, 1917 – March 30, 2011) was an American actor, singer, songwriter and stage manager.

== Biography ==
A frequent performer and producer on Broadway, Peterson was also known for his West End performances in the London productions of Oklahoma! and South Pacific.

Peterson was married to the Australian performer Joy Nichols from 1949 until the mid-1970s, when they divorced. They had three children: two daughters and a son. Peterson died in New York City on March 30, 2011, at the age of 93.
