= Take It from Here =

British radio comedy programme

- Other names: TIFH (or TIFE)
- Genre: Comedy
- Running time: 30 minutes
- Country of origin: United Kingdom
- Language: English
- Home station: BBC Light Programme
- Syndicates: BBC Radio 4 Extra
- Starring: Jimmy Edwards; Dick Bentley; Joy Nichols; Clarence Wright; Wallas Eaton; June Whitfield; Alma Cogan; The Keynotes
- Announcer: David Dunhill
- Written by: Frank Muir; Denis Norden; Barry Took; Eric Merriman
- Produced by: Charles Maxwell
- Recording studio: Paris Theatre, London
- Original release: 23 March 1948 – 3 March 1960
- No. of series: 13
- No. of episodes: 328
- Website: www.bbc.co.uk/programmes/b00cf9wv

Take It from Here (often referred to as TIFH, pronounced – and sometimes humorously spelt – "TIFE") is a British radio comedy programme broadcast on the BBC Light Programme between 1948 and 1960. It was written by Frank Muir and Denis Norden, and starred Jimmy Edwards, Dick Bentley and Joy Nichols. When Nichols moved to New York City in 1953, she was replaced by June Whitfield and Alma Cogan. The show is best remembered for introducing The Glums. Through TIFH Muir and Norden reinvented British post-war radio comedy – amongst other influences, it was one of the first shows with a significant segment consisting of parody of film and book styles, later used extensively in programmes such as Round the Horne and in many television comedy series.

== History ==
=== Genesis ===
Frank Muir had been writing material for Jimmy Edwards's appearances at the Windmill Theatre, and later wrote material for Edwards's radio character, a seedy public school headmaster; Denis Norden had been staff comedy sketch writer with the Kavanagh agency, and had written material for the Australian comedian Dick Bentley. The radio producer Charles Maxwell had contracted Edwards, together with Joy Nichols and Dick Bentley, for the final series in 1947 of the radio show Navy Mixture for which Muir had provided some scripts, and after this show ended Maxwell received a commission for a new weekly comedy series to star Edwards, Nichols and Bentley. He introduced Muir to Norden, and asked them if they would collaborate to write the scripts.

The result was Take It from Here and the start of one of the most enduring comedy writing partnerships. Muir and Norden were to continue collaborating for nearly 50 years, writing such comic masterpieces as Peter Sellers' sketch Balham, Gateway to the South, and appearing together on radio panel games My Word! and My Music.

=== Early years ===
The first series of TIFH, broadcast in 1948, was set in a commercial radio station office. Although this first series was not a roaring success, Maxwell persuaded the management to persevere for one more series.

In the second series, Muir and Norden changed to a three-act format. Firstly there was a topical discussion, followed by music from The Keynotes close harmony group. Then came what Muir termed a gimmick, which might be Hamlet done as a pantomime, or an operatic weather forecast. Finally, after another song from Nichols or Bentley, there was a situation comedy sketch worked up from the clichés of a literary or cinematic genre; for example, later TIFH programmes included a sketch about restoration England, with Charles II, Nell Gwyn and the Puritan keeper of the Privy Purse ("anything TV can do, we can do later"); or a spoof spy story set on an international sleeper from London to Paris ("…as I moved through the train I gazed at a handsome film star, slumbering in his compartment, and a thought struck me – whether you're great or whether you're humble, when you sleep upright you dribble"). In addition, the character actor Wallas Eaton was engaged to play minor male roles, replacing Clarence Wright from the first series.

The main announcer throughout the programme's run was David Dunhill, known as "Dunners", although other staff announcers took his place on occasion, famously including Brian Matthew, later to become a mainstay of Light Programme and Radio 2 music programmes.

In 1953 Joy Nichols married an American, and settled in New York City in the hope of becoming a success in Broadway theatre. Because she had been engaged both as singer and actress, she was replaced by Alma Cogan the singer, and June Whitfield the actress (Prunella Scales was also considered as a replacement).

For the first episode of the next series, the TIFH Talking Point segment featured a parody of the sagas of 'nice' families such as those eponymously named in The Archers or Life With The Lyons that abounded on the BBC at the time. This introduced an uncouth dysfunctional family called the Glums, with Mr Glum the archetypal chauvinist pig.

=== The Glums ===
First appearing on TIFH on 12 November 1953, the popularity of this sketch made Muir and Norden realise that they were on to something. They made one or two modifications to the characters, and The Glums became a regular part of Take It from Here.

The premise of The Glums was the long engagement between Ron Glum and his long-term fiancée Eth. As a result of post-war austerity, long engagements were common in 1950s Britain. A typical episode would start in the pub, with Mr Glum (played by Jimmy Edwards) talking to the barman (played by Wallas Eaton). It would be closing time, and Mr Glum would start telling the week's story to the barman as a ruse for obtaining another pint (or two) of "brahn" (brown ale). The story would be about some recent episode in the lives of Ron, Mr Glum's dim son (played by Dick Bentley), and Eth, a plain girl for whom Ron represented her only chance of marriage, played by June Whitfield. Bentley, who played the son, was almost thirteen years older than Edwards, who played the father.

A short signature tune would herald a change of scene to the Glums' front room, where Ron and Eth would be sitting on the sofa. Eth would say, "Oh, Ron...!" – her catchphrase – and Ron would vacantly reply something like, "Yes, Eth?" and the week's story would begin in earnest. This opening formula was constantly varied slightly. For instance, in one episode, Eth says, "Oh, Ron, is there anything on your mind, beloved?", to which Ron, after a pause, replies, "No, Eth." Another example has Eth saying "Oh really, Ron, do you expect me to just sit here, like a lemon?", to which Ron responds "No thanks Eth, I've just had a banana."

Most weeks, after scene-setting comedy business between Ron and Eth, Eth would say something like, "Sometimes, Ron, you're so placid – I just wish you would have a little go!" which Ron would stupidly misinterpret as an invitation to a kiss and cuddle. Eth would resist, and Ron and Eth's grappling would be speedily interrupted by the entrance of Mr Glum with an "'Ullo, 'ullo!" and something like "All in wrestling – break clean!" or "Sorry to interrupt, but have you seen the garden shears? Mrs Glum wants to do her eyebrows."

The story usually involved some crisis in the relationship of the three protagonists. In several episodes this crisis followed from Ron's laziness, and his resultant inability to find employment. Some weeks it would be due to Mr Glum's refusal to let Ron and Eth marry (in one episode this is because he is not sure that Ron really loves Eth, in another Eth takes Mr Glum to court because he will not give his consent to the marriage). One story was about Eth getting into difficulties because she was accused of pilfering at the office where she was a secretary. Very often, the story arose from the consequences of some idiotic behaviour on the part of Ron, who was incapable of competently carrying out any simple task, even going to the fish-and-chip shop (in which instance he put his change up his nose).

Another character, who never appears but who is sometimes to be heard incoherently behind the scenes, was Mrs Glum, the family matriarch (Alma Cogan, the singer, usually provided Ma Glum's off-stage noises). Although she never had a speaking part, Ma Glum provided comedy value by always being put upon by Mr Glum, and yet always getting her way (such as the episode where Mr Glum pawned her false teeth). Alma Cogan also played other sundry feminine parts, such as occasional extramarital romantic interest for Mr Glum.

=== Final year ===
In 1959, Muir and Norden decided to move into writing for television, and so stopped writing TIFH. The BBC brought in writers Barry Took and Eric Merriman for the 1959-1960 series, but this was to be Take It from Here's last.

== Influence ==
The parody sketch, previously used in stage revues but brought to radio by Muir and Norden for Take It from Here, was very influential on comedy shows such as Round the Horne and many television programmes.

In one of the parody sketches, a take-off of the films of English north country factory owners, Muir claimed that they introduced the phrase "Trouble at t'Mill". For one series, Wallas Eaton portrayed an opinionated newspaper letter writer named Disgusted of Tunbridge Wells, another phrase that entered the language.

Many of the jokes and comic exchanges from Take It from Here were recycled in the series of Carry On films when scriptwriter Talbot Rothwell ran out of time, and Muir and Norden gave him some old TIFH scripts – for instance, the line spoken by Julius Caesar (played by Kenneth Williams) in Carry On Cleo on facing some would-be assassins: "Infamy! Infamy! They've all got it in for me!"

While the humour was undoubtedly parochially British, in his autobiography Frank Muir expressed gratification and wonder that the show was so well received in Australia – where TIFH's subtlety, and the show's implied confidence in the listeners' level of intelligence, were commented on in the Australian press as characteristics one would have expected to lead to the show's failure there!

In the 1970s, the Oslo-based radio network NRK produced and transmitted a Norwegian-language version of Take It from Here under the title Familien Glum.

== Television revival of The Glums ==
The Glums were remembered sufficiently for the format to be revived in 1978 as part of the unsuccessful Bruce Forsyth's Big Night programme. A single stand alone series of The Glums was produced and broadcast the following year (consisting of eight episodes) by London Weekend Television, usually drawing on two original radio scripts each week. Ron Glum was played by Ian Lavender and Eth by Patricia Brake, while Jimmy Edwards reprised the role of Pa Glum.

A Region 2 DVD of both the Bruce Forsyth's Big Night shorts and the subsequent 1979 series was commercially released in 2011 in the UK.
