= Eyewitness (British TV series) =

British nature and science TV series

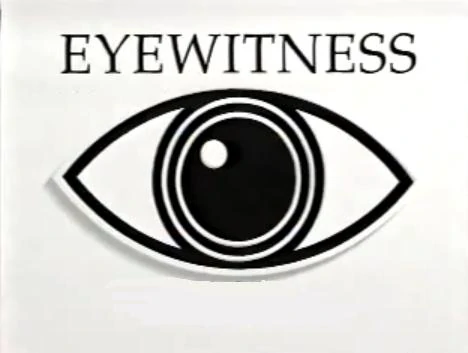
- Created by: Jill Matthews
- Narrated by: Andrew Sachs; Martin Sheen (US, seasons 1–2)
- Theme music composer: Guy Michelmore
- Composers: Guy Michelmore; Guy Dagul
- Countries of origin: United Kingdom; United States
- Original language: English
- No. of seasons: 3
- No. of episodes: 39 + 1 special

Production
- Running time: 30 minutes
- Production companies: BBC Wildvision (season 1); Cafe Productions (season 2); BBC Scienceworld (season 3); Dorling Kindersley Vision; BBC Lionheart Television (season 1); BBC Worldwide Americas (seasons 2–3); Oregon Public Broadcasting

Original release
- Network: PBS (US); Disney Channel (UK, seasons 1–2)
- Release: April 3, 1995 – April 30, 1998

Eyewitness is a nature and science television series based on the bestselling Eyewitness Books series by Dorling Kindersley. It was produced by the BBC, DK Vision (the video production arm of Dorling Kindersley) and Oregon Public Broadcasting. Guy Michelmore composed the series' opening and ending themes, as well as the score for each individual episode of Season 1, with Guy Dagul writing the score for each individual episode of seasons 2 and 3, respectively. Dagul's scores for season 3 also incorporated stock music tracks and cues by Dick DeBenedictis. The series aired from 1995 to 1998 (seasons 1–3) on PBS in the United States and from 1995 to 1996 (seasons 1–2) on Disney Channel in the United Kingdom.

== Premise ==
Eyewitness is a documentary series. Each half-hour episode focuses on a single subject in the field of natural science, such as the Solar System or the various functions of the human body, similar in form to the book series on which it was based, with most being based, in part or in whole, off of existing book titles at the time, with few exceptions (though some titles, such as "Planets" and "Natural Disaster" started off as episodes and were made into books years later).

== Format ==
The series takes place in the fictional "Eyewitness Museum", a CGI science museum made to replicate, enhance, and expand upon the much-imitated white and empty signature visual style of the books that made them so successful in the first place. Combining fact with fiction, various galleries within the museum are always featured and change constantly with each season and episode and stock footage, which is usually seen through large windows or other depressions in the walls of the museum is also shown regularly. The original book series is known for its striking visual style involving objects specially photographed against a plain white background, and the accompanying TV series brings this to life through video and audio. In addition, almost every episode features a "Hero". The Hero is an animal, character, or object which drives the action of the episode and is continually referred back to throughout. These include the rooster-shaped weathervane from "Weather", Legs the claymation Tyrannosaurus from "Dinosaur", the shape-shifting paper boat from "Pond and River", the hyena from "Monster", the salmon from "Fish", the crab from "Seashore", the cockroach from "Prehistoric Life", the robotic human mime artist from "Human Machine", Smedley the living human skeleton from "Skeleton", Connell from "Dog", and the husky and king penguin from "Arctic and Antarctic".

The original British version of the series was narrated by the late Andrew Sachs for its entire run, while the American dub had Martin Sheen narrating for the first two seasons. However, Sachs took over narrating both versions (with his voice dubbed into American English for that region) for the third and final season. The series producer was Bill Butt for the first season, Briget Sneyd and sometimes Richard Thomson whenever Sneyd had to serve as editor for the second season, and Martin Mortimore for the third season.

In the US, the series aired in primetime on PBS nationwide. When the series was released onto VHS following the original run of each season, the US version of episodes from the first two seasons featured brief behind-the-scenes "making of" clips, each lasting five minutes after the main program, with the UK version having this feature for episodes of the third and final season. In 2003, eight episodes of the series were released onto interactive DVDs that featured interactive links to brief clips from other episodes of the series during the main program. The UK narration was kept in the American releases of these interactive DVDs, which were distributed by the Library Video Company through its Schlessinger Media division. A few years later, continuing well into the early 2010s, a larger number of episodes were released onto DVD in the US. The US narration was included on these releases, as well as the first special as a bonus feature.

There are also four Eyewitness Virtual Reality software titles based on the series: "Cat", "Bird", "Dinosaur Hunter", and "Earth Quest". One of these, "Shark", although seen on the elevator console, was never made.

Eyewitness has also been dubbed into other languages for broadcast internationally, including Spanish, Italian, French, German, Dutch, Russian, Indonesian, and Finnish, among others.

== Episodes ==
Episodes from the first two seasons aired in the UK on Disney Channel, sometimes earlier than their American counterparts. According to former DK executive Christopher Davis, the BBC "relegated [the series] to some obscure kiss-of-death time slot".

=== Season 1 (1995) ===
No. overall	No. in season	Title	Original air date (US) (Note: All original air dates are for PBS, as recorded in Newspapers.com. In the United States, production reports estimated that the series would air in fall 1994, though the series would ultimately premiere in April 1995.)	Original air date (UK)
1	1	"Cat"	3 April 1995	TBA
Discusses cats, both wild and domestic.
2	2	"Horse"	10 April 1995	TBA
Discusses horses and their wild relatives.
3	3	"Reptile"	17 April 1995	TBA
Discusses reptiles.
4	4	"Fish"	24 April 1995	TBA
Discusses fish.
5	5	"Dog"	1 May 1995	TBA
Discusses dogs and their wild relatives and ancestors.
6	6	"Bird"	8 May 1995	TBA
Discusses birds.
7	7	"Elephant"	15 May 1995	TBA
Discusses elephants.
8	8	"Shark"	22 May 1995	TBA
Discusses sharks and their relatives, rays and skates.
9	9	"Insect"	29 May 1995	TBA
Discusses insects.
10	10	"Amphibian"	5 June 1995	TBA
Discusses amphibians.
11	11	"Dinosaur"	12 June 1995	TBA
Discusses dinosaurs.
12	12	"Jungle (Note: Also released on DVD as "Rainforest".)"	19 June 1995	TBA
Discusses rainforests.
13	13	"Skeleton"	26 June 1995	TBA
Discusses the skeletal system and how it varies in different species, including humans.
—	—	"The Making of Eyewitness"	Unaired	October 17, 1995
Shows the making of the opening sequence and a scene from each episode. Released on most US DVDs as a special feature, and individually on VHS and VCD.

=== Season 2 (1996–1997) ===
No. overall	No. in season	Title	Original air date (US)	Original air date (UK)
14	1	"Volcano"	14 October 1996	TBA
Discusses volcanoes and earthquakes.
15	2	"Ape"	21 October 1996	TBA
Discusses non-human primates.
16	3	"Prehistoric Life"	28 October 1996	TBA
Discusses the origin and evolution of life on Earth, from the earliest microbes to the appearance of modern humans.
17	4	"Seashore"	4 November 1996	TBA
Discusses the intertidal zone.
18	5	"Tree"	11 November 1996	TBA
Discusses trees.
19	6	"Desert"	18 November 1996	TBA
Discusses deserts.
20	7	"Shell"	25 November 1996	TBA
Discusses shells.
21	8	"Butterfly and Moth"	2 December 1996	TBA
Discusses butterflies and moths.
22	9	"Pond and River"	5 May 1997	TBA
Discusses ponds and rivers.
23	10	"Mammal"	19 May 1997	TBA
Discusses mammals.
24	11	"Rock and Mineral"	26 May 1997	TBA
Discusses geology.
25	12	"Arctic and Antarctic"	2 June 1997	TBA
Discusses the Earth's polar regions.
26	13	"Weather"	16 June 1997	TBA
Discusses weather.

=== Season 3 (1998) ===
No. overall	No. in season	Title	Original air date (US)	Original air date (UK)
27	1	"Planets"	22 January 1998	TBA
Discusses the planets and other objects in our Solar System, as well as their study and exploration, past present, and future.
28	2	"Flight"	29 January 1998	TBA
Discusses the history and properties of flight: both in nature and in human civilization, past, present and future.
29	3	"Life"	5 February 1998	TBA
Discusses biology.
30	4	"Sight"	12 February 1998	TBA
Discusses the world of vision.
31	5	"Bear"	19 February 1998	TBA
Discusses bears.
32	6	"Natural Disaster"	26 February 1998	TBA
Discusses earthquakes, volcanoes, tsunamis, floods, hurricanes, tornadoes, blizzards, avalanches, drought, wildfires, and asteroid impacts.
33	7	"Plant"	5 March 1998	TBA
Discusses plants.
34	8	"Survival"	26 March 1998	TBA
Discusses how animals survive in the natural world.
35	9	"Human Machine (Note: Also released on DVD as "Bodyzone".)"	2 April 1998	TBA
Discusses the human body.
36	10	"Mountain"	9 April 1998	TBA
Discusses mountains
37	11	"Ocean"	16 April 1998	TBA
Discusses oceans.
38	12	"Island"	23 April 1998	TBA
Discusses islands.
39	13	"Monster"	30 April 1998	TBA
Discusses mythical and real monsters.

=== "Making of" features ===
A short "making of" segment was included with each episode on some VHS releases. "The Making of Eyewitness" compiled some of these along with original material. Similar compilations for season 2 ("The Making of Eyewitness 2: Living Earth") and season 3 ("The Making of Eyewitness 3: Worlds") were briefly available on the now-defunct official Eyewitness YouTube channel.

== Home media ==
All three seasons were released on VHS by DK Vision and BBC Worldwide in both the US and the UK; season 1 was also released in the UK on VCD.

Most episodes have been released on DVD in the US and UK by DK Vision. Some episodes were also released – in their UK dubs – for the US library market by Schlessinger Media. Twelve DVDs were released in the UK as giveaways with the Daily Mirror in 2007.

== Reception ==
The series has won several awards:

- 1994 Parents' Choice Award (for "Jungle")
- 1996 NEA Award
- 1996 1997 and 1998 Golden Gate Awards
- Chicago International Children's Film Festival Excellence in Children's Media
