= Peter Fettes =

BBC radio presenter

- Occupations: BBC radio presenter and manager

Peter Fettes was a BBC Radio presenter, active in the 1940s and 1950s. He subsequently became a BBC head of staff training.

He appeared as a castaway on the BBC Radio programme Desert Island Discs on 11 August 1945.
