= BBC Forces Programme =

Former British national radio station during World War II (1940–1944)

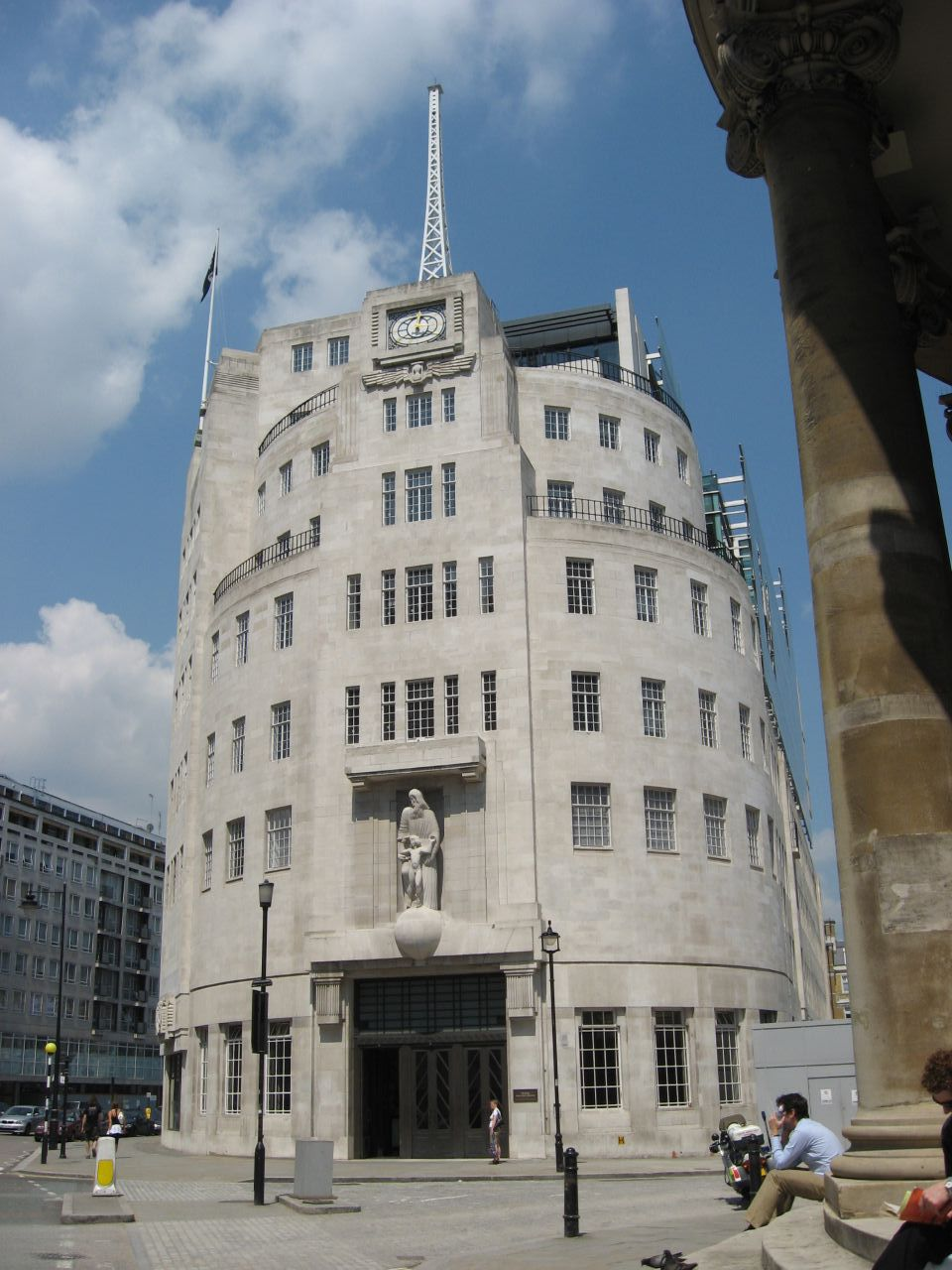
- The Forces Programme headquarters was at Broadcasting House in London.
- Country: United Kingdom
- Headquarters: Broadcasting House, London, England
- Owner: BBC
- Established: 7 January 1940; 86 years ago
- Dissolved: 26 February 1944; 82 years ago
- Language: English
- Replaced by: BBC General Forces Programme

The BBC Forces Programme was a national radio station which operated from 7 January 1940 until 26 February 1944, when it was replaced by the BBC General Forces Programme.

== History ==
=== Development ===
Upon the outbreak of World War II on 1 September 1939, the BBC closed both existing National and Regional radio programmes, combining the two to form a single channel known as the BBC Home Service.

Domestically, the BBC's medium wave transmitters continued to broadcast only the Home Service until the start of 1940, when the lack of choice and of lighter programming for people serving in the British Armed Forces having been noted – some of the former regional frequencies (804 and 877 kHz) were given over to a new service known as the Forces Programme.

=== Programming ===
The BBC Home Service had been put together in a hurry and many of the pre-war favourite programmes had been lost. The new network mainly concentrated on news, informational programmes and music – in the early days of the war, the theatre organist Sandy MacPherson provided several hours a day of light organ music to fill gaps in the schedule. It became clear that the members of the armed services during the Phoney War, especially those in France who had been expecting to fight, were now mainly sat in barracks with little to do. The BBC Forces Programme was launched to appeal directly to these men.

Although intended for soldiers, civilians in England could receive the Forces Programme, among them it became more popular than the Home Service and after the Battle of France, will also continue to broadcast in the United Kingdom. The Forces Programme's mixture of drama, comedy, popular music, features, quiz shows and variety was richer and more varied than the former National Programme, although it continued to supply lengthy news bulletins, informational and talk. Programming was developed for specific services include:

- Ack Ack Beer Beer – for the anti-aircraft and barrage balloon stations
- Garrison Theatre – for the British Army
- Danger - Men at Work!
- Sincerely Yours, Vera Lynn
- Hi Gang – for the British Armed Forces

Initially, the station was on the air from 11.00 am until 11.00 pm. However, from Sunday 16 June 1940, the station would commence its broadcasting day from 6.30 am and would continue until 11.00 pm. These broadcasting hours remained in place until the new BBC General Forces Programme began on Sunday 27 February 1944, with the service maintaining the same broadcasting hours.

Commonwealth troops had broadcasts designed for them on the Forces Programme. From 1942, American troops also received their own broadcasts on the service; popular American variety programming, such as Charlie McCarthy, The Bob Hope Show, and The Jack Benny Program, appeared on the BBC for the first time. The British benefited from wartime co-operation only had to pay $60 for The Bob Hope Show, which cost $12,000 to produce. A brief daily programme on American sports also began, as did rebroadcasts of the American military's Command Performance and Mail Call. The broadcasts led to concerns over "Americanisation" of the BBC, but an executive stated that 90% of British soldiers would choose American music if they had a choice.

=== Closure ===
The BBC Forces Programme was replaced when the influx of American soldiers used to a different style of entertainment programming, had to be catered for in the run up to 'D-Day'. The replacement service was named the BBC General Forces Programme and was also broadcast on the shortwave frequencies of the Overseas Service (which itself had been known until November 1939 as the Empire Service, and it was relaunched again on 1 May 1965 as BBC World Service).

After Victory in Europe Day, the frequencies of the former National Programme (200 and 1149 kHz) were taken over by the new BBC Light Programme.

=== Inheritance ===
The pre-war National Programme, whilst using the same frequencies and transmitters as the post-war Light Programme, was not the general entertainment network its successor the Light Programme became. The Light Programme was more of a child of the Forces and General Forces Programme, with a style of presentation and programming that had not existed in the United Kingdom before the war.

== Sources ==
=== Further reading ===
- Various authors. BBC Year Book 1947. London: British Broadcasting Corporation. 1947.
- Graham, Russ J A new lease of life Radiomusications from Transdiffusion, undated; accessed 5 February 2006
- Hancock, Dafydd. Forces of Light. Radiomusications from Transdiffusion, undated; accessed 5 February 2006.
- Took, Barry. Laughter in the Air. London: Robson Books. 1976. ISBN 0-903895-78-1.
- Briggs, Asa. History of Broadcasting in the United Kingdom. Oxford: Oxford University Press. 1995. ISBN 0-19-212930-9.
