= Keith Fordyce =

English disc jockey and presenter (1928–2011)

- Fordyce presenting a show for BBC Radio Devon
- Born: Keith Fordyce Marriott; 15 October 1928; Lincoln, England
- Died: 15 March 2011 (aged 82); Paignton, Devon, England
- Occupations: Disc jockey, television presenter
- Spouse: Anne Mercer (m. 1954)
- Children: 4

Keith Fordyce Marriott (15 October 1928 – 15 March 2011) was an English disc jockey and presenter on British radio and television. He was both the first presenter of the ITV television pop music programme Thank Your Lucky Stars in 1961 and of the youth-orientated magazine show Ready Steady Go! on Associated-Rediffusion from 1963 to 1965. Fordyce was a stalwart of both BBC Radio and Radio Luxembourg for many years, being co-host of the BBC Light Programme's Sunday morning show Easy Beat until 1967 and was the first presenter of BBC Radio 2's Sounds of the 60s series from 1983 to 1986.

== Early life ==
Fordyce was born on 15 October 1928 in the St. Giles district of Lincoln, the son of HM Customs and Excise officer Frank Joseph Marriott and his wife, Catherine Mary (née Armstrong). He attended Lincoln School (today the Lincoln Christ's Hospital School) from 1937 to 1947, and won the 1946 Lincolnshire Junior Lawn Tennis Championship. Fordyce only competed in the competition once before he was ruled ineligible when he turned 18.

Upon leaving school, he joined the Air Training Corps when he was 15 and did his national service with the Volunteer Reserves with the Royal Air Force in Germany for two years. Fordyce was seconded to the British Forces Network (now BFBS) in Hamburg, and he conducted sports commentary, continuity announcing, disc jockeying, producing and presenting.

After completing his national service, he read law at Emmanuel College, Cambridge from 1949 to 1952, graduating with a master's degree. Fordyce served as the president of the Cambridge University Law Society from 1951 to 1952, and founded and edited Light Blue, the university's sport magazine. After that, he worked as a personal management trainee at Sainsbury's while endeavouring to get a job in radio. Fordyce also worked as a hedgecutter and a postman.

== Career ==
From 1952 to 1955, Fordyce worked as a freelancer, doing work for the BBC and ITV. In November 1952, he made his first television broadcast commentating on a football match between Leyton Orient F.C. and Hereford F.C. for BBC Television. Fordyce became the youngest compere of the BBC Light Programme morning flagship programme Housewives' Choice for a week in August 1955. The same year saw him successfully contest a municipal election and he served as a Conservative Party councillor on Wimbledon Borough Council.

Fordyce was offered the role of a staff announcer at Radio Luxembourg in 1955 and remained at the broadcaster as Head of its British Department for three years. He was the presenter of the station's weekly Top Twenty programme. Fordyce introduced the Power Play format to the United Kingdom in which he selected a new release that was featured for a whole week. He was also a journalist for New Musical Express for three years, and returned to England in 1958. Fordyce was a member of the panel of the ABC television game show For Love or Money in 1959. He was the compere of the short-lived ITV programme Wham! in 1960, and was selected to be the first presenter of the ITV television pop music programme Thank Your Lucky Stars in 1961. Fordyce made a cameo appearance as himself in the 1961 comedy film Dentist on the Job.

In 1962, he began presenting the local Westward Television game show Treasure Hunt for 14 series, and was referee of the weekly ITV pop music contest Needle Match that was held between American and British pop records. Fordyce joined the BBC Light Programme in the early 1960s and was the presenter of the lunchtime programme Pop Inn. In August 1963 he presented the first edition of the Friday night live hour-long youth-orientated pop music magazine Ready Steady Go! on Associated-Rediffusion television, being joined subsequently in 1964 by Cathy McGowan and Michael Aldred. McGowan took over the show when Fordyce left in April 1965. In 1964, Fordyce presented Search for a Star, a ITV series that sought to discover a new female television personality. He was co-presenter of the ITV quiz show Groucho with Groucho Marx in 1965, and acted as Marx's interpreter of British customs and sayings.

He joined fellow disc jockey Annie Nightingale as the host of the request programme That's for Me. Fordyce was also the presenter of the BBC Sunday morning radio programme Easy Beat until it was axed when BBC Radio 1 was launched in 1967. In the following year, he presented the BBC darts-based quiz show Quiz Time, Gentlemen, Please! Other work for Fordyce included presenting the inter-regional dancing contest Come Dancing, Open House, various award shows, New Year's Eve parties and the Miss World 1970 contest with Bob Hope. In 1967 he provided the commentary for the BBC's first colour test transmission on BBC2, the first men's singles final of the Open era at Wimbledon. He was the host of Late Night Extra on BBC Radio 2 between 1969 and 1974, and eight series of the quiz show Town and Country Quiz on the same radio station. Fordyce was co-presenter of the Thames Television self-sufficiency programme Kitchen Garden with Claire Rayner for four series from 1976 to 1979.

Between 1976 and 1978, he was the host of the radio quiz show Support Your Local that was held between BBC Local Radio stations. For nine years beginning in 1979, he hosted the Saturday morning BBC Radio 2 quiz programme Beat the Record in which listeners had to identify pieces of light music. Fordyce briefly returned to Radio Luxembourg in 1983, and presented shows on the commercial radio station DevonAir, being a founding board member of the station. He was the first presenter of the Saturday morning BBC Radio 2 series Sounds of the 60s from 1983 to 1986. Prior to his retirement that was brought on by Alzheimer's disease Fordyce presented regular weekend shows on BBC Radio Devon and BBC Radio Solent, and started broadcasting on the golden oldie radio station Brunel Classic Gold in Bristol in January 1994 and remained there for ten months.

== Personal life ==
Fordyce married the microbiologist Anne Mercer at the St Mary the Virgin Church in Merton, Surrey on 6 February 1954. They had four children. Fordyce founded the self-supporting Torbay Aircraft Museum near Paignton in Devon in 1971 and was its curator until its closure in 1988. He supported the Liberal Party and spoke in support of David Penhaligon at a 1970s election meeting in Truro. He died of pneumonia at the Belle Vue House Nursing Home in Paignton, Devon on 15 March 2011.
