= Keith Skues =

British radio personality

Richard Keith Skues MBE, AE (born 4 March 1939) is a British radio personality. His career spans more than 60 years.

== Biography ==
Skues was born in Timperley, Cheshire. His broadcasting career began on the British Forces Network in Cologne, Germany, in 1959. This was followed by overseas tours to Kuwait, Kenya and Aden. He returned to Britain in 1964 and joined Radio Atlanta, which then merged with Radio Caroline.

He is credited with making The Byrds recording of Bob Dylan's Mr Tambourine Man a hit in the UK Charts, released on the CBS record label. As a thank you for the song's success, he was offered the CBS record show on Radio Luxembourg starting in January 1966. It was here that he began using an instrumental version of Mr Tambourine Man by The Golden Gate Strings as his theme tune, which he still used as of 2020. He then presented on Radio London from the summer of 1966 until The Marine Broadcasting Offences Act became law on 14 August 1967.

He was one of the original presenters on the newly launched BBC Radio 1 in September 1967, and was the second DJ heard on the very first day, following on from Tony Blackburn, presenting Saturday Club. In 1969, he took over the weekday afternoon show before moving on to What's New, which was broadcast every weekday from 4:15 pm to 5:15 pm. Other Radio shows included Album Time, Radio 1 Club and Night Ride, which was also broadcast simultaneously on BBC Radio 2.

Skues left Radio 1 in 1974 and was appointed programme director of Radio Hallam (now Hallam FM) in Sheffield. In 1987, Hallam merged with two other Yorkshire stations to form The Yorkshire Radio Network with Skues being made Group Programme Consultant. In 1989, the group launched Classic Gold on its AM frequencies and Skues became programme controller, as well as broadcasting six days a week.

In 1991, Skues briefly took over the afternoon show on BBC Radio Sheffield. He then had a brief spell on an afternoon show on BBC Radio 2. He served with the RAF for many years. In January 1992, he went to Saudi Arabia for two months as Public Relations Officer for the Royal Air Force detachment in Dhahran. Squadron Leader Skues was a member of the public relations team at RAF Marham for the 75th anniversary of the Royal Air Force on 1 April 1993, an event which was attended by members of the Royal Family. He was awarded the Air Efficiency decoration in 2005.

In 1995, he moved to Norfolk, and for 10 years he broadcast programmes on Monday–Friday nights from 10 pm to 1 am on BBC Radio Norfolk, BBC Radio Suffolk, BBC Essex, BBC Radio Northampton, BBC Radio Cambridgeshire and BBC Three Counties.

In April 2005, Skues became semi-retired, but could still be heard on the above BBC Local Radio stations on Sundays from 9 pm to 1 am with a show entitled Pirate Radio Skues, which included an "archive hour", replaying an hour of classic pirate radio from home-taped recordings. The "Archive Hour" was discontinued in 2009, following changes to BBC compliance rules. BBC Radio Lincolnshire also took his show on Sundays, although it is generally not in their BBC region. From the start of 2010, the word 'Pirate' was dropped from the programme's title, and the programme also included music from the 1970s.

With effect from 3 October 2010, Skues' Eastern Counties programme was reduced to 2 hours – 11 pm to 1 am, but from January 2013 it was extended by an hour to a 10pm start and could be heard on BBC Radios Norfolk, Suffolk, Essex, Three Counties Radio, Cambridge, Northampton and Lincolnshire from 10 pm to 1 am. The show went on a hiatus after airing on 22 March 2020, due to the COVID-19 pandemic, but returned on 23 August that year, only for a six week run until it reached its 500th show, as Skues decided to step down from regular BBC broadcasting. The final weekly edition of 'Skues Me' was broadcast on 27 September 2020, although he returned for two festive specials in December that year.

As of 2024, Skues continues to broadcast occasional shows on Radio Mi Amigo, a station based on the LV18 lightship in Harwich harbour.

Skues received a Lifetime Achievement Gold Badge Award from the British Academy of Songwriters, Composers and Authors (now the Ivors Academy) on the 20 October 2005.

From 2007 until early 2009, he also had a rock and roll show on Saturdays from 7 pm to 9 pm, entitled Rock'n'Roll Heaven, on BBC Three Counties Radio (Bedfordshire, Buckinghamshire and Hertfordshire). It returned in August 2010, hosted by Bernie Keith, broadcast across the eastern counties between 6pm and 8pm.

== Honours ==
Skues was admitted into the Freedom of the City of London on 25 July 1997.

He was awarded an MBE in the 2004 New Year Honours, personally presented by HM The Queen at Buckingham Palace, for services to broadcasting and charity.

== Books ==
- Radio Onederland, Landmark Press, Lavenham, Suffolk 1968;
- Cornish Heritage, Werner Shaw, London WC2H 0HY 1983 ISBN 0-907961-00-2;
- Pop Went the Pirates, Lambs' Meadow, Sheffield 1994 ISBN 0-907398-02-2;
- Harringay Lodge No.2763, Lambs' Meadow, Norfolk 1999;
- That's Entertainment, Lambs' Meadow, Norfolk 2005 ISBN 0-907398-04-9;
- Pop Went the Pirates II, Lambs' Meadow, Norfolk 2009 ISBN 978-0-907398-05-9;
- Pirate Radio An Illustrated History (with David Kindred), Amberley Publishing, Stroud, Gloucester 2016, Paperback ISBN 978-1-4456-5905-3. ebook ISBN 978-1-4456-3776 1
