= Sam Costa =

English singer, entertainer and broadcaster

- Born: Samuel Gabriel Costa; 17 June 1910; Stoke Newington, London, England
- Died: 23 September 1981 (aged 71); Hillingdon, London, England
- Known for: Singer, comic actor, broadcaster
- Spouse: Esther Comer

Samuel Gabriel Costa (17 June 1910 – 23 September 1981) was an English singer, entertainer and broadcaster. Initially a popular singer in the dance band era and a comic actor on the show Much-Binding-in-the-Marsh, he was later a disc jockey for Radio Luxembourg and the BBC.

== Life and career ==
Costa was born in Stoke Newington, London, the son of journalist Gabriel Costa and Annie (née Sawer), and was of Sephardic Jewish-Portuguese ancestry – Costa is a Jewish, and non-Jewish, Portuguese surname.

Sam Costa began his career as a pianist with Bert Firman's band. He later became a popular British dance band singer in the 1930s making many records with bands such as Jack Jackson, Lew Stone, Harry Leader, Maurice Winnick and Jay Wilbur. After his crooning days, his BBC radio career began in 1939 with the It's That Man Again (ITMA) shows with Tommy Handley, in which he took the part of Lemuel the office boy. He then worked with Kenneth Horne, Richard Murdoch and Maurice Denham in Much-Binding-in-the-Marsh.

In 1950, he started hosting Record Rendezvous on the BBC, and also hosted The Sam Costa Show on Radio Luxembourg. On Sundays he did both Breakfast Time and Glamorous Nights and he also presented Housewives' Choice and Midday Spin, transitioning to BBC Radio 2 from 1967. On BBC Radio 2, he had various shows: morning, lunchtime, afternoon, early evening, and late night. Costa would sign off saying "Thank you for the pleasure of your company".

On Radio Luxembourg in the early 1960s, he hosted an hour-long show sponsored by Guards Cigarettes. Along with Kenneth Horne, Costa also appeared in an episode of The Men from the Ministry which co-starred Richard Murdoch. While he generally disliked TV work, Costa did appear on several Juke Box Jury shows. In 1964, he linked a musical short film, Just for You which featured some prominent "pop" bands of the day, including The Applejacks and Freddie and the Dreamers. Costa was also a regular on David Frost's Frost on Sunday in 1970.

He married Esther Comer in 1938; they were married for over 40 years. He was the great-uncle of the radio presenter Andy Jacobs.

Sam Costa died in London in 1981.

== Filmography ==
- A Piece of Cake (1948)
- Trouble in the Air (1948)
- One Wild Oat (1951)
- The Pickwick Papers (1952)
- Just For You (1964)

1956 One Wish Too Many (A CFF film)

Media offices
Preceded by First Presenter	BBC Radio 2 Drivetime Show presenter 1971–1976	Succeeded by John Dunn
