= BBC Light Programme =

Former British national radio station (1945–1967)

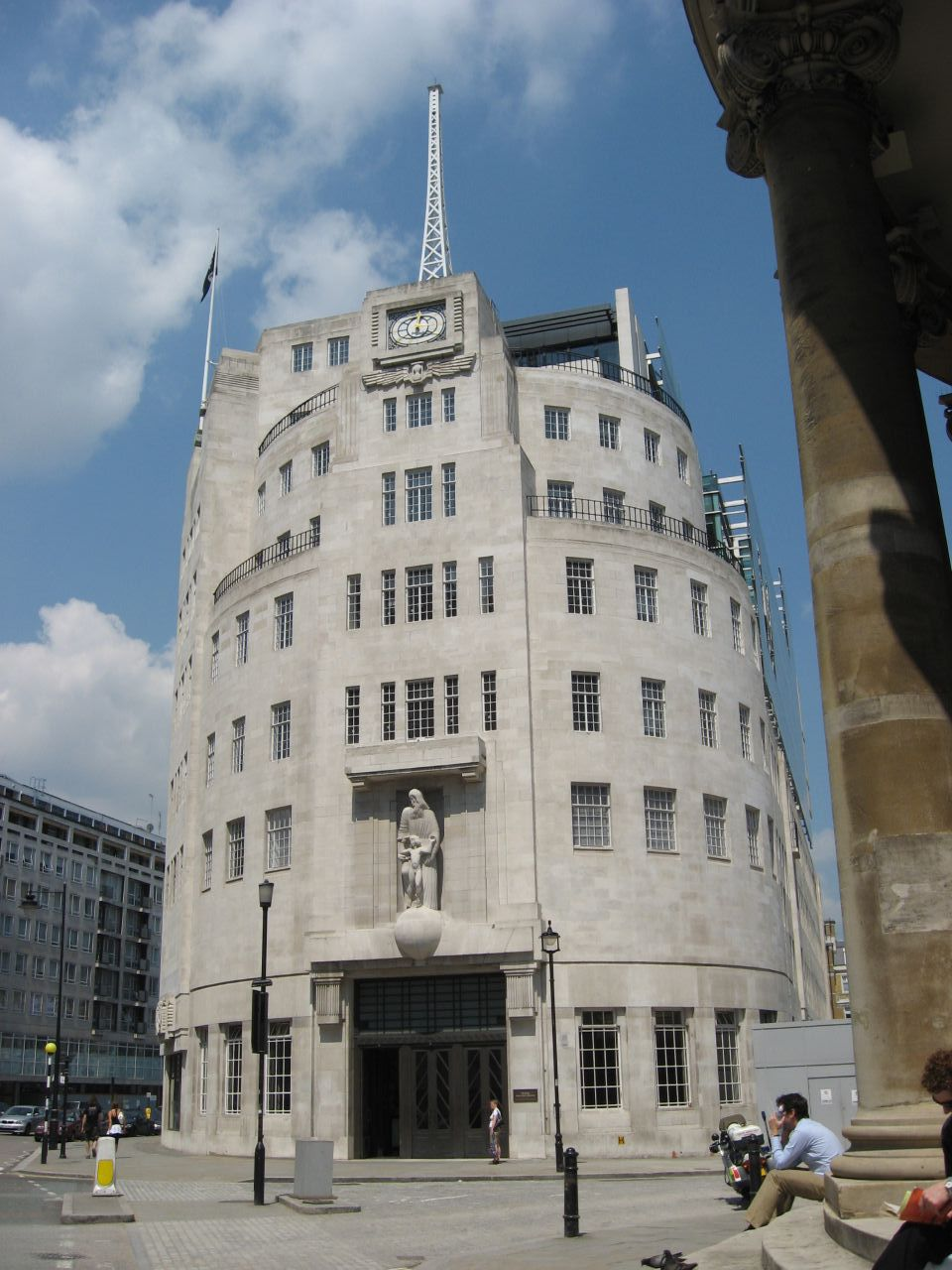
- The Light Programme headquarters was at Broadcasting House in London.
- Country: United Kingdom
- Headquarters: Broadcasting House, London, England
- Owner: BBC
- Launch date: 29 July 1945; 81 years ago
- Dissolved: 29 September 1967; 58 years ago
- Language: English
- Replaced: BBC General Forces Programme
- Replaced by: BBC Radio 1 BBC Radio 2

The BBC Light Programme was a national radio station which broadcast chiefly mainstream light entertainment and light music from 1945 until 1967, when it was replaced by BBC Radio 1 and BBC Radio 2. It opened on 29 July 1945, taking over the long wave frequency which had earlier been used – prior to the outbreak of the Second World War on 1 September 1939 – by the BBC National Programme.

The service was intended as a domestic replacement for the wartime BBC General Forces Programme which had gained many civilian listeners in Britain as well as members of the British Armed Forces.

== History ==
The long wave signal on 200 kHz / 1500 metres was transmitted from the Droitwich Transmitting Station in the English Midlands (as it still was until 2026 for BBC Radio 4, although adjusted slightly to 198 kHz / 1515 metres from 1 February 1988) and gave fairly good coverage of most of the United Kingdom, although a number of low-power medium wave transmitters (using 1215 kHz / 247 metres) were added later to fill in local blank spots. Over the course of the 1950s and 1960s, the Light Programme (along with the BBC's two other national stations – the BBC Home Service and the BBC Third Programme) gradually became available on what was known at the time as VHF, as the BBC developed a network of local FM transmitters.

From its first day of broadcasting in 1945 until Monday 2 September 1957, the Light Programme would be on the air from 9:00 a.m. until midnight each day, apart from Sundays when it would come on the air at 8:00 am until 11:00 pm.

There was, however, a period of a year when the Light Programme was forced to end its broadcasting day one hour earlier at 11:00 p.m. This commenced in mid-February 1947 as an effect from the appalling winter of 1946–1947 which saw a fuel shortage in the country with the government enforcing electricity saving measures, one of which was losing one hour of broadcasting per day from the Light Programme. Even after the fuel shortage had ended by spring 1947, the 11:00 closedown each night continued as BBC Radio found itself in financial problems and needed to save money. The midnight closedown of the Light Programme resumed one year later from Sunday 11 April 1948. The long-running soap opera The Archers was first heard nationally on the Light Programme on New Year's Day 1951, although a week-long pilot version had been broadcast on the Midlands Home Service in 1950.

From Monday 2 September 1957, the Light Programme's broadcasting hours would start to increase, with a new early morning start time of 7:00 a.m. until midnight, later moving to 6:30 a.m. from Monday 29 September 1958.

In 1964, broadcasting hours were increased even more, with a new morning start time of 5:30 a.m. from Monday 31 August. Up until September 1964, the Light Programme would always end its broadcasting day at midnight; however this changed on Sunday 27 September 1964, when a new closedown time of 2:02 a.m. was introduced.

The Light Programme closed down for the last time at 2:03 a.m. on Friday 29 September 1967. At 5:30 a.m., it was replaced by BBC Radio 2 and at 7:00 a.m. by BBC Radio 1 on medium wave.

== Programming ==
Some programmes broadcast from the Light Programme still continue today, such as Junior Choice, Friday Night Is Music Night, The Archers, Pick of the Pops, Desert Island Discs and Woman's Hour. Other programmes included:

- The Al Read Show
- Appointment with Fear
- The Archers (1951–1967)
- The Beatles Invite You to Take a Ticket to Ride (1965)
- Beyond Our Ken
- Billy Cotton Band Show
- Breakfast Special
- The Clitheroe Kid
- Dick Barton – Special Agent
- Does the Team Think?
- Desert Island Discs (1945–1946)
- Easy Beat (1960–1967)
- Educating Archie
- Family Favourites (1945–1967)
- Friday Night Is Music Night (1953–1967)
- From Us to You (1964)
- The Goon Show (repeats from the Home Service)
- Hancock's Half Hour
- Have a Go! (1946–1967)
- Housewives' Choice
- Ignorance is Bliss
- I'm Sorry, I'll Read That Again
- It's That Man Again (repeats from the Home Service)
- Journey into Space (1953–1958)
- Junior Choice (1954–1967)
- Life with the Lyons
- Listen with Mother (1950–1964)
- Meet the Huggetts
- Movie-Go-Round
- Midday Spin
- Mrs Dale's Diary (1948–1967)
- Much Binding in the Marsh
- Music While You Work
- The Navy Lark
- Orbiter X
- Pick of the Pops (1955–1967)
- Parade of the Pops (1960–1967)
- Paul Temple
- The Public Ear
- Pop Go the Beatles (1963)
- Radio Newsreel
- Ray's a Laugh
- Richard Attenborough's Record Rendezvous
- Riders of the Range
- Round the Horne (1965–1967)
- Roundabout
- Saturday Club (1957–1967)
- Shadow of Sumuru
- The Showband Show
- Side by Side
- Sing Something Simple (1959–1967)
- The Sunday Half-Hour (1945–1967)
- The Slide
- Sports Report
- Take It from Here (1948-1960)
- The Talent Spot
- Teenager's Turn – Here We Go
- Top Gear (1964–1967; a music show unrelated to the car franchise)
- Variety Bandbox
- Waterlogged Spa
- Welsh Rarebit
- Woman's Hour (1946–1967)
- Workers' Playtime (Home Service until September 1957)
- Your Hundred Best Tunes

== Presenters ==
- Barry Alldis
- Marjorie Anderson
- Richard Attenborough
- Tony Blackburn
- Tim Brinton
- Michael Brooke
- Desmond Carrington
- Sam Costa
- Bill Crozier
- Alan Dell
- Robert Dougall
- David Dunhill
- John Dunn
- Don Durbridge
- Simon Dee
- Franklin Engelmann
- Peter Fettes
- Alan Freeman
- Keith Fordyce
- Tim Gudgin
- Peter Haigh
- Colin Hamilton
- David Hamilton
- Paul Hollingdale
- David Jacobs
- Brian Matthew
- Jean Metcalfe
- Sandy MacPherson
- Roger Moffat
- Ray Moore
- Pete Murray
- Annie Nightingale
- Ray Orchard
- Robin Richmond
- Phillip Slessor
- Douglas Smith
- Ken Sykora
- David Symonds
- John Webster
- Roy Williams
- Bruce Wyndham
- Terry Wogan
- Jimmy Young
