= BBC General Forces Programme =

Former British national radio station during and after World War II (1944–1946)

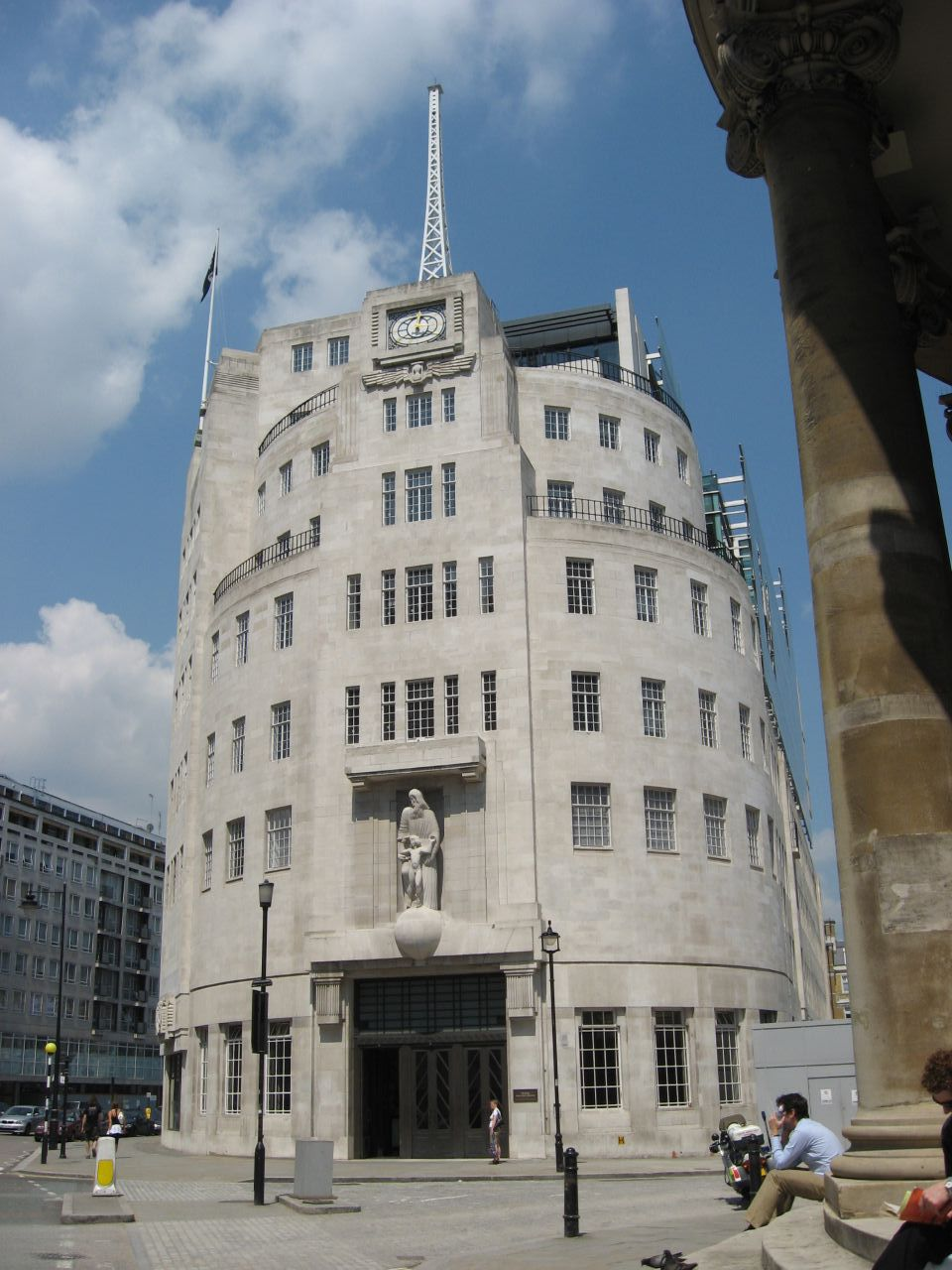
- The General Forces Programme headquarters was at Broadcasting House in London.
- Country: United Kingdom
- Headquarters: Broadcasting House, London, England
- Owner: BBC
- Established: 27 February 1944; 82 years ago
- Dissolved: 31 December 1946; 79 years ago
- Language: English
- Replaced: BBC Forces Programme
- Replaced by: BBC Light Programme; BBC Allied Expeditionary Forces Programme; BBC Overseas Service; British Forces Network

The BBC General Forces Programme was a national radio station operating from 27 February 1944 until 31 December 1946.

== History ==
=== Development ===
Upon the outbreak of World War II on 1 September 1939, the BBC closed both existing National and Regional radio programmes, combining the two to form a single channel known as the BBC Home Service. The former transmitters of the National Programme continued to broadcast the Home Service until 1940, when the lack of choice and lighter programming for people serving in the British Armed Forces was noted. At that point, some prewar frequencies were given to a new entertainment network, the BBC Forces Programme.

The BBC Forces Programme was replaced when the influx of American soldiers, used to a different style of entertainment programming, had to be catered for in the run up to 'D-Day'. This replacement service was named the General Forces Programme, and was also broadcast on shortwave on the frequencies of the Overseas Service.

=== Programming ===
The BBC Forces Programme was launched to appeal directly to those members of the armed services during the Phoney War who were mainly sat in barracks with little to do. Its mixture of drama, comedy, popular music, features, quiz shows and variety was richer and more varied than the former National Programme, although it continued to supply lengthy news bulletins, informational and talk. However, when the American servicemen arrived en masse in 1943 and 1944 as preparation for Operation Overlord, they found even the richer Forces Programme shows to be staid and slow compared with the existing output of the American networks.

In response to appeals from General Dwight Eisenhower, the BBC abolished the Forces Programme and established the General Forces Programme, designed to provide a mixture of programming suitable for American and British audiences and also to appeal to the "Home Front", who research had shown wished to listen to the same output as the forces once fighting had broken out. As well as a large number of American network and Canadian Broadcasting Corporation programmes, the General Forces Programme also offered British programming:

- Shipmates Ashore – for the Merchant Navy, starring Evelyn Laye and Doris Hare
- Navy Mixture – with Joy Nichols
- Forces' Favourites – a record request show which later became Family Favourites
- War Office Calling the Army – information and news for servicemen
- Strike a Home Note – for Scottish servicemen overseas
- Welsh Half Hour
- SEAC – a newsletter for the South-East Asian theatre
- Hello GIs – a newsletter for Americans in Britain
- Mediterranean Merry-Go-Round – made up of Stand Easy for the British Army
- Much-Binding-in-the-Marsh – for the Royal Air Force
- HMS Waterlogged – for the Royal Navy

The General Forces Programme maintained the previous broadcasting hours of the Forces Programme on air each day from 6.30 am until 11.00 pm.

=== Closure ===
After Victory in Europe Day, the British longwave frequencies of the General Forces Programme became the BBC Light Programme on 29 July 1945. The service continued broadcasting by shortwave to areas that were still seeing fighting, and after Victory over Japan Day to occupying forces in each former occupied and enemy country.

As Britain began to disengage from each fighting area and civilian rule was finally restored and the soldiers demobbed, the reason for the existence of the General Forces Programme faded. In each area, it was slowly replaced by the Overseas Service until its complete closure on 31 December 1946.
