= Family Favourites =

- Other names: Two-Way Family Favourites (1955–1967)
- Country of origin: United Kingdom
- Language: English
- Home station: BBC Light Programme; BBC Radio 2
- Syndicates: ABC (Australia); BFBS; CBC (Canada); Radio New Zealand; RTHK (Hong Kong)
- Hosted by: Cliff Michelmore; Jean Metcalfe; Bill Crozier (Cologne only); Michael Aspel; Judith Chalmers; Sarah Kennedy; Jean Challis; Pete Murray (segments only); Ed Stewart (segments only)
- Original release: 1 August 1945 – 13 January 1980
- Opening theme: With a Song in My Heart

Family Favourites (remembered by its later name Two-Way Family Favourites) is the successor to the wartime radio show Forces Favourites, broadcast at Sunday lunchtimes on the BBC Light Programme, later BBC Radio 2 from 1945 until 1980. From September 1967 to April 1973, it was also carried on BBC Radio 1. It was a request programme designed to link families at home in the UK with British Forces serving in West Germany or elsewhere overseas.

It had the signature tune "With a Song in My Heart" (original played by Andre Kostelanetz and his Orchestra) and was presented by a variety of radio personalities, including Cliff Michelmore and Jean Metcalfe who met while presenting the show and later married on 4 March 1950, Bill Crozier (in Cologne only), Michael Aspel, Judith Chalmers, Sarah Kennedy, and the final British presenter Jean Challis. Both Pete Murray and Ed Stewart continued to use the title for segments only of their shows, often linking up with places such as Australia and New Zealand for another couple of years during the 1980s; during this time, the song "Hurry Home" by Wavelength became popular with the families of troops returning from the Falklands War. Aspel returned to host a one-off special edition of the show for BBC Radio 2's 40th birthday celebrations, on 30 September 2007.

== Internationally ==
When the programme expanded, it encompassed far-flung corners of the Commonwealth with, amongst others, Bill Paull being the link man in Canada, June Armstrong-Wright in Hong Kong, Ross Symonds in Australia, Don Durbridge in Gibraltar and Marama Martin in New Zealand.
