= Merriman =

Merriman may refer to:

== People ==
=== Surname ===
- Arthur Douglas Merriman (1892–1972), English military officer
- Ashley Merriman, American chef and restaurateur
- Boyd Merriman, 1st Baron Merriman (1880–1962), British Conservative Party politician and judge
- Brian Merriman (1749–1805), Irish poet and teacher
- Daniel Merriman (1838–1912), American minister and museum president
- Edgar C. Merriman (1840–1894), American military officer
- Eric Merriman (1924–2003), British comedy scriptwriter for radio and TV
- Frederick Merriman (disambiguation), multiple people
- Gregory Merriman (born 1988), Australian ice dancer
- Helen Bigelow Merriman (1844–1933), American painter, art collector, and philanthropist
- Huw Merriman (born 1973), British Conservative Party politician, former Member of Parliament (MP) for Bexhill & Battle
- James Merriman (1816-1883), Australian merchant and politician
- James Merriman (rugby union) (born 1984), Welsh rugby union player
- James Merriman (soccer) (born 1985), Canadian soccer coach
- James A. Merriman (1869–1946), American physician and newspaper editor
- John Merriman (disambiguation), multiple people
- Marcus Merriman (1940–2006), American historian
- Nan Merriman (1920–2012), American opera singer
- Nick Merriman (born 1960), British museum director
- Percy Merriman (1882–1966), British musician
- Peter Merriman, American chef, restauranteur and one of the founders of Hawaii regional cuisine
- Richard Merriman (born 1958), English cricketer
- R. B. Merriman (1876–1945), American historian
- Robert E. Merriman (1916–1983), American actor and director
- Robert Hale Merriman (1908–1938), American commander of republican forces in the Spanish Civil War
- Ryan Merriman (born 1983), American actor
- Shawne Merriman (born 1984), American football player
- Stefan Merriman (born 1973), New Zealand enduro rider
- Truman A. Merriman (1839–1892), U.S. Representative from New York
- William Merriman (1838–1917) Colonel, CIE, British officer Royal Engineers & FA Cup Finals goalkeeper

=== First name ===
- Merriman Smith, American journalist
- Merriman Colbert Harris, American Methodist missionary bishop
- Merriman Cuninggim, Methodist minister and university administrator

=== Others ===
- Henry Seton Merriman, pen name of English author Hugh Stowell Scott (1862–1903)
- King Merriman, a title of Australian Aboriginal elder Umbarra (died 1904)

== Places ==
- Merriman Island, Wallaga Lake, New South Wales, Australia
- Merriman, Nebraska, a village in Cherry County, Nebraska (USA)
- Merriman, Northern Cape, a village in South Africa
- Merriman Park/University Manor, Dallas, a neighborhood association

== See also ==
- Merryman
