= Sarah W. Whitman =

American artist

Sarah Wyman Whitman
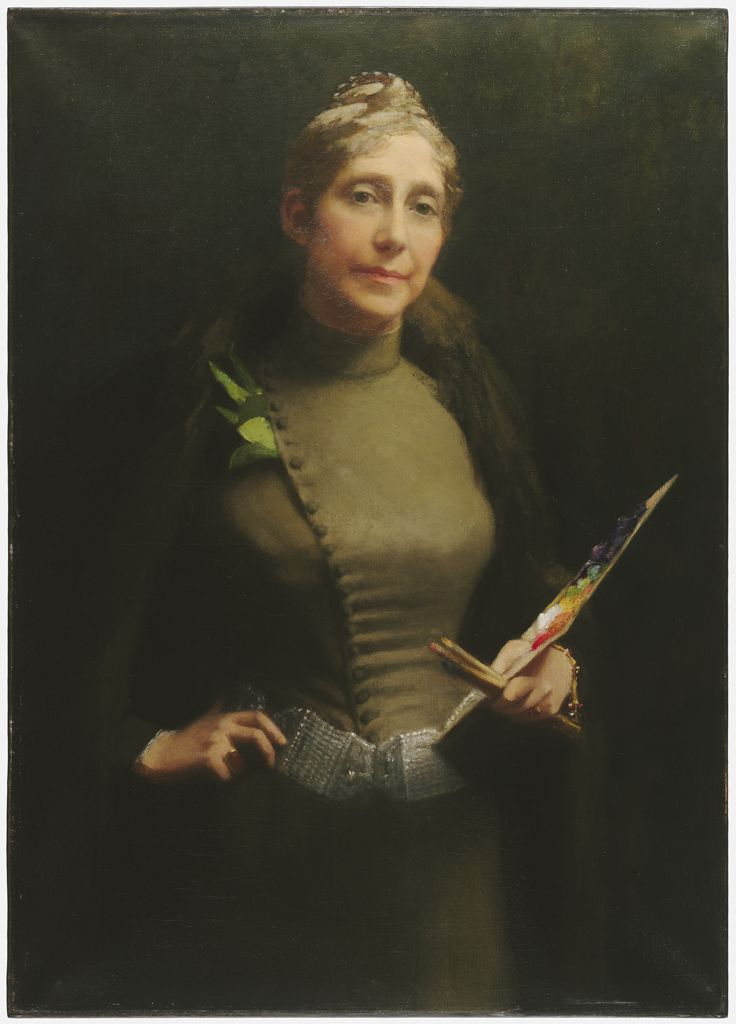
- Sarah Wyman Whitman, painting by Helen Bigelow Merriman, 1909–10
- Born: Sarah de St. Prix Wyman; December 5, 1842; Baltimore, Maryland, US
- Died: June 24, 1904 (aged 61); Boston, Massachusetts, US
- Resting place: Mount Auburn Cemetery, Boston
- Known for: Book Illustration, Stained glass, Painting
- Style: Arts and Crafts Movement
- Spouse: Henry Whitman
- Awards: Bronze medal, 1901 Pan-American Exposition

Sarah de St. Prix Wyman Whitman (1842–1904) was an American stained glass artist, painter, and book cover designer. Successful at a time when few women had professional art careers, she founded her own firm, Lily Glass Works. Her stained glass windows are found in churches and colleges throughout the northeastern United States. As a member of the board of the Harvard University "Annex," she helped to found Radcliffe College.

== Early years and education ==
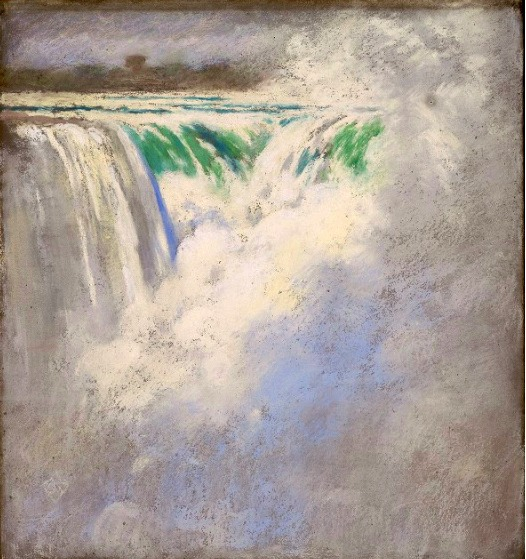
Niagara Falls pastel drawing 1898

Sarah de St. Prix Wyman was born in Baltimore, Maryland in 1842 to banker William Wyman and Sarah Amanda (Treat) Wyman, who were visiting the city from their home in Lowell, Massachusetts. She had one brother, Charles (1845-1911), who suffered from mental illness and was institutionalized in about 1882. By her third birthday, in the aftermath of her father's involvement in a bank scandal, the family had moved her to Baltimore, Maryland, where she spent most of her childhood with her wealthy Wyman relatives. When she turned 11, in 1853, she moved back to Lowell, where she was educated by tutors.

At the age of 24, she married Henry Whitman, a well-to-do wool and dry goods merchant. They hosted a literary club in their townhouse on Boston's Beacon Hill and summered in Beverly Farms, then an exclusive section of Boston's North Shore. The writer George Santayana described her as one of Boston's two "leading ladies" in the early 20th century, with the other being Isabella Stewart Gardner, for whom Whitman designed the carved sign over the entrance to her house, now a museum.

Whitman's artistic training was rather short. She began her artistic training at the age of 26 in Boston with William Morris Hunt and William Rimmer (1869–1871), one of their earliest women students. In 1877 she made the first of two trips to France to study with Thomas Couture at Villiers-le-Bel. Along with her trips to France, Whitman traveled to Spain, Italy and England several times to study architecture and the paintings of the Old Master's. Despite the fact that she never completed the French course of training, within a decade she had established herself as a successful stained glass window designer, painter, and book cover designer.

== Painting ==
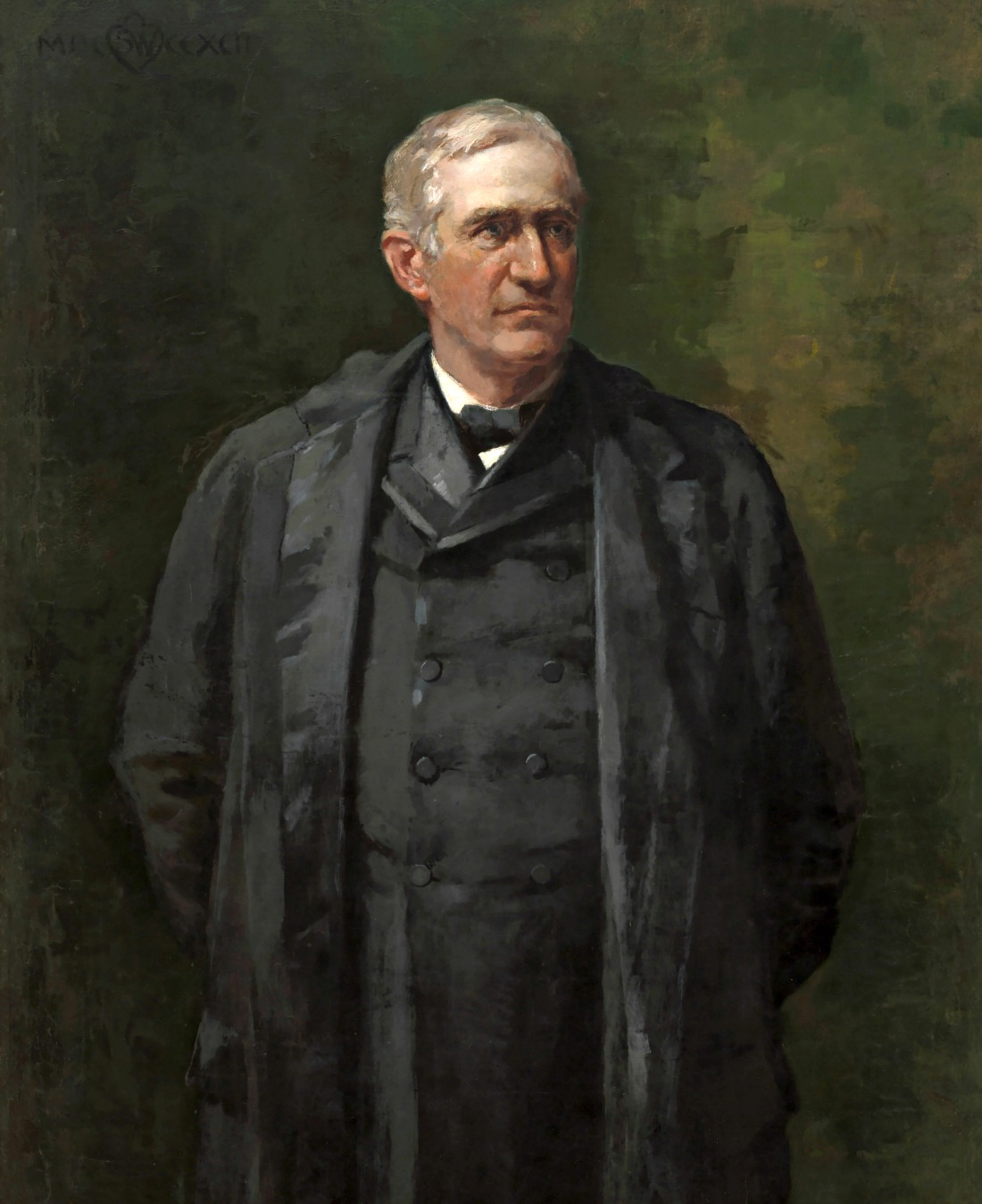
Thomas F. Bayard portrait, before 1893

Whitman focused on painting early in her career. She worked in both oil and pastel, primarily painting rural landscapes and floral studies. She began to exhibit her work in the 1870s. She painted landscapes in Massachusetts, Rhode Island, New Hampshire and southern Maine. "She often explored the mysterious effects created by fog, twilight, mist, or moonlight, using broad sweeps of color that favor atmospheric effects over specific detail." She also painted many portraits. She liked to paint hers subjects against dark backgrounds, a style she learned in art studies in France.

Whitman won numerous awards and exhibited her work widely at venues ranging from the Society of American Artists in New York to the National Academy of Design. She received honorable mentions at the Paris Expositions of 1889 and 1900, and she won a bronze medal at the 1901 Pan-American Exposition. The Boston Museum of Fine Arts holds a number of her paintings, including Roses—Souvenir de Villier le Bel (1877 or 1879), Sunset (c. 1880), Rhododendrons (c. 1880), and A Warm Night (1889).

Whitman exhibited her work at the Palace of Fine Arts at the 1893 World's Columbian Exposition in Chicago, Illinois.

== Stained glass work ==
In the early 1880s, Whitman apprenticed herself to the noted stained glass artist John La Farge, and her later independent work shows his influence. But she moved beyond his formalism, bringing a more personal spiritual dimension to her own work. By the 1890s, she had become one of the leading designers of stained glass windows in the Northeast and she had set up her own studio, the Lily Glass Works, at 184 Boylston Street in Boston. She worked in colored, transparent, and the new opalescent glass, an American invention of the 1880s that was becoming increasingly popular due to La Farge's innovative work in Trinity Church, Boston.

Whitman was an innovator in American modern stained glass. At a time when opalescent glass was sometimes criticized by traditionalists, Whitman argued for its adoption. She described the material as "a new form of stained glass, in which it is possible to attain an infinite variety of tones in the same sheet," noting that when both opal and color are mingled "there is a magnificence of effect never seen before". She was also well known for using clear panels in her work. Prominent stained glass artist Charles Connick, noted that Whitman was one of the early American stained glass artists to use designs more closely associated with architecture.

Whitman was an influential spokesperson for American stained glass, believing American glass to be superior to British stained glass. In an article, she wrote for The Nation in 1892, she stated that "American glassmakers (herself included), preferred to create their motifs by exploiting modulations in the colors and thickness of the stained glass itself rather than applying paint to the surface of the glass or depending upon the dark outlines of the leading, as did many English designers."

=== Central Congregational Church, Worcester ===
In 1884, Whitman got her first important commission on the recommendation of La Farge. She was commissioned to design several windows for the Central Congregational Church in Worcester, Massachusetts, including the rose window, floral windows, transparent windows with decorative leading, and divider windows. Her studio, Lily Glass Works, assembled the designs. Elements such as faces were executed in vitreous paint after her watercolor designs, as was standard practice at the time. Some final details may have been painted by Whitman herself after the windows were installed.

The church's rose window is mainly executed in red cathedral glass of varying hues. Its center includes faceted orange 'jewels' that lend an extra sense of dimension to the window. The floral-motif windows are designed in colored glass against a plain translucent background and represent biblically significant plants. Transparent glass in the church is exemplified by a round window with a floral design in lead tracery. (This simplified, highly linear approach to design is also a hallmark of Whitman's book design work.) The divider windows in the church, which are inset into a wooden wall between the front doors and the main church hall, are made of opalescent glass and feature snowdrops, symbolic of renewal after winter.

An unusual work is the church's Jerusalem Window, which has a text in black letters against a golden ground. The letters are in a font of Whitman's own devising, one that she used also in some of her book designs. Above the text hovers the silhouette of a fig leaf.

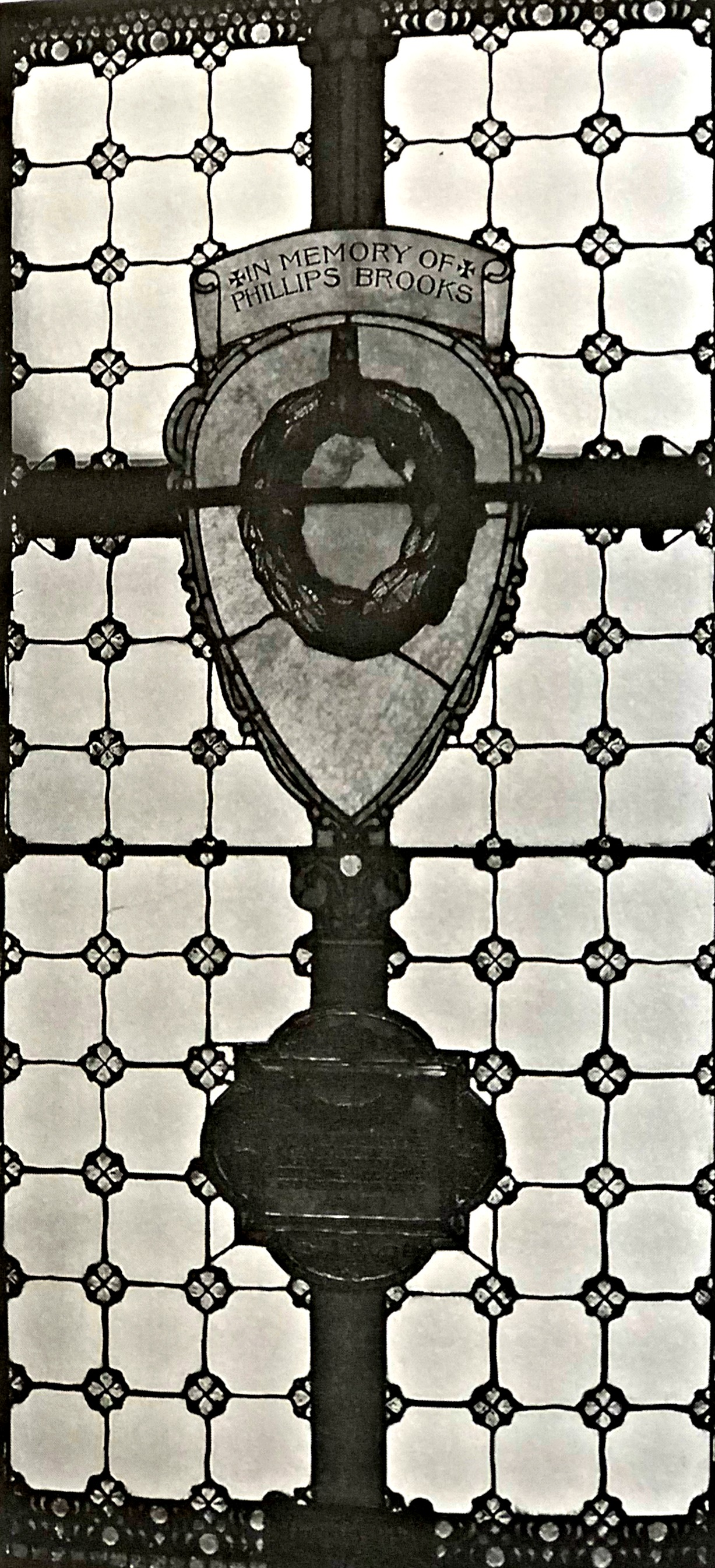
Phillips Brooks Memorial window, Trinity Church, Parish House, Boston c 1895

=== Trinity Church, Boston ===
Whitman's involvement with Trinity Church early in her career extended beyond her work with stained glass. For thirty years (1874-1904), she taught an adult Bible class at the church during the winter. In the summers, she organized a Bible class at a Baptist church near her vacation home in Beverly Farms. In both places, she raised funds for church-related projects such as a library and a reading room.

Whitman created the Phillips Brooks Memorial window for the room in Trinity Church parish house, dedicated to the recently deceased rector, Phillips Brooks. The window was a gift from Whitman and her Trinity Church Bible class. The work was begun in 1895 and installed in March, 1896. The window, which overlooks the small cloister garden that separates the church and parish house, was not just a decoration according to Whitman. It was to be "used for practical purposes" and meant to be viewed thru to the garden. She designed the window with square panes of clear glass for that purpose. Whitman's combination of function and decoration in her stained glass work was a modern innovation and would be used later by such artists as Frank Lloyd Wright.

=== First Parish Church, Brookline ===
In 1896, Whitman designed a large window in opalescent glass for the First Parish Church in Brookline, Massachusetts. Its composition features a trio of contemplative young angels. Created to honor three members of the Lowell family who had died young, the Lowell Window is compositionally similar to the Honor and Peace Window she designed a few years later for Memorial Hall at Harvard University. She deliberately left the faces of the three angels undifferentiated in order to transcend individuality. It is considered one of her finest works in stained glass.

=== Memorial Hall, Harvard University ===
At the end of the century, Whitman designed two large windows for Memorial Hall Harvard University to commemorate the Harvard students killed in the American Civil War. Whitman designed the windows to include historical figures of soldiers and poets. The Brimmer Window (1896), showing the Chevalier Bayard, is in the south transept, while the Honor and Peace Window (1900) is in the main hall.

=== Other stained glass works ===
- Christ Church, Andover, MA (1886): Cruciform design in transparent glass with lead tracery
- Fogg Memorial Library at Berwick Academy in Maine (1894): 100 windows, including a Memorial Window commemorating the Civil War in transparent glass with lead tracery
- Memorial Hall, Bowdoin College (c. 1901–1903): Window honoring Sarah Orne Jewett's father
- Schlesinger Library at the Radcliffe Institute: Three windows, Courage, Love, and Patience, originally created for the 1904 St. Louis Exposition

== Book design and illustration ==
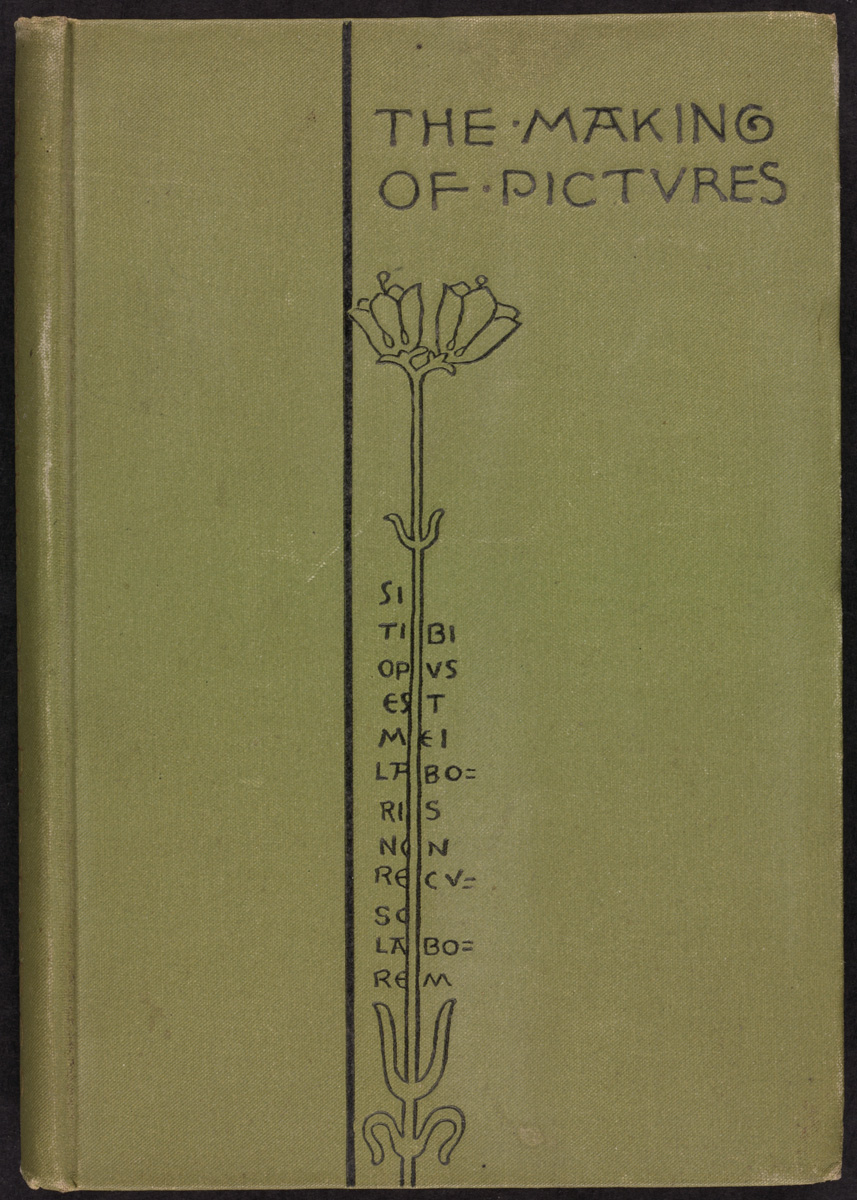
Cover design by Whitman for her own book The Making of Pictures (Boston: Interstate Publishing, 1886).

Whitman is considered one of the most prominent book-cover designers of her day, often ranked with Margaret Neilson Armstrong and Alice Cordelia Morse. "Whitman helped to establish the medium, long the domain of die-cutters and binders, as a suitable specialty for artists, thus ushering in a new era in American design."

Over the course of two decades beginning around 1884, she designed the illustrations and covers of over 200 books, occasionally including some version of her own 'flaming heart' logo. She was the first professional woman artist to work regularly for Houghton Mifflin and was one of their principal designers. She designed books by authors such as Oliver Wendell Holmes, James Russell Lowell, Thomas Bailey Aldrich, Celia Thaxter, and especially her friend Sarah Orne Jewett. She designed almost all of the covers for Jewett's novels. The cover for which she is best known showed ornamental poppies, and was designed for a book for a friend, Celia Thaxter's An Island Garden.

Although her aesthetic drew heavily on the Arts and Crafts Movement, her designs were almost radical in their minimalism, leaving substantially more negative space than was typical. Her spare designs featured elegant linear drawings or silhouettes (usually of plants) and sometimes an asymmetrical composition. Colors tended towards a muted palette of greens, golds, and deep reds. Her designs helped to spark a trend towards a more minimal aesthetic for book covers.

Whitman considered that the designer's challenge was to create an aesthetically satisfying experience within the constraints imposed by the economics of book publishing. As she put it:

"You have got to think how to apply elements of design to these cheaply sold books; to put the touch of art on this thing that is going to be produced at a level price, which allows for no handwork, the decoration to be cut with a die, the books to go out by the thousand and to be sold at a low price. . . What I feel is that under these conditions, the more necessary it is to design covers well because they are really like aesthetic tracts. They go everywhere."

A large collection of books she designed was donated to Bowdoin College in Maine.

== Public service ==
Whitman was very active in arts organizations. She inaugurated the Boston Water Color Club for women in response to the fact that the Boston Society of Water Color Artists admitted only men. She was also a charter member and vice-president of the Boston Arts and Crafts Society (1897–1904), which she co-founded in 1897. She organized the annual fancy-dress ball for the city's Arts Festival. She also published one book, The Making of Pictures (Boston, 1886), which offered aspiring artists practical advice on training, media, materials, and careers.

Whitman became the first president of the Women's Auxiliary for the troops in Boston, most of which she organized herself.

== Death and legacies ==
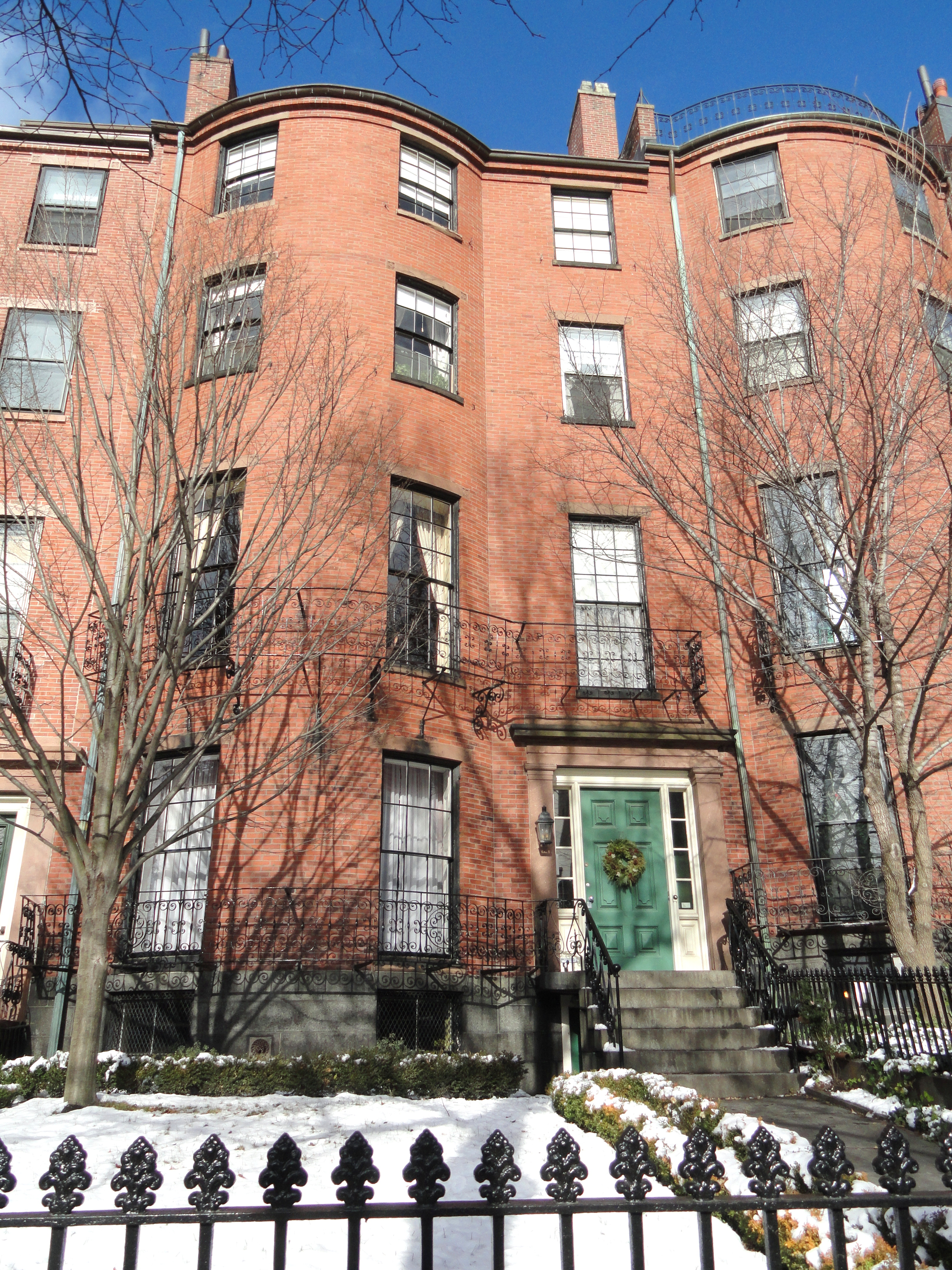
77 Mount Vernon St. in Boston, Whitman's home from 1880 to 1904.

Whitman was diagnosed with heart disease in 1901 but continued many of her activities up to her last illness. In her final years, she lived with her sister Mary Rice in South Berwick, Maine, near her close friend Sarah Orne Jewett. She died at Massachusetts General Hospital in Boston, Massachusetts on June, 24th, 1904, at the age of 61. Of her death, her close friend the philosopher William James wrote, "She leaves a dreadful vacuum in Boston. I have often wondered whether I should survive her."

The major beneficiaries of Whitman's will included the Boston Museum of Fine Arts and Radcliffe College, which each received bequests of $100,000. Whitman's commitment to ameliorating racial inequality is attested by bequest of $50,000 to Tuskegee University in Alabama. She also left $2,000 to Berea College in Kentucky, which had been founded by abolitionists. During her lifetime, she actively promoted Howard University and Tuskegee University.

Many of Whitman's papers are housed in the Houghton Library, Harvard University.

The Boston Arts and Crafts Society organized a memorial exhibition of her book covers and stained glass windows in 1905. The following year, the Boston Museum of Fine Arts hosted an exhibit of her pastel and oil works.

A volume of her correspondence, Letters of Sarah Wyman Whitman, was published in 1907, three years after Whitman's death.

The artist Helen Bigelow Merriman painted a posthumous portrait of Whitman that now hangs in the Radcliffe College Room of the Schlesinger Library.

Since 1936, the Club of Odd Volumes has been located at Whitman's former home at 77 Mt. Vernon Street in Beacon Hill.

== Honors ==
In 1912, the third residence hall at Radcliffe College was named the Whitman Dorm in her honor.

Whitman is commemorated on the Boston Women's Heritage Trail.
