= Worcester Art Museum =

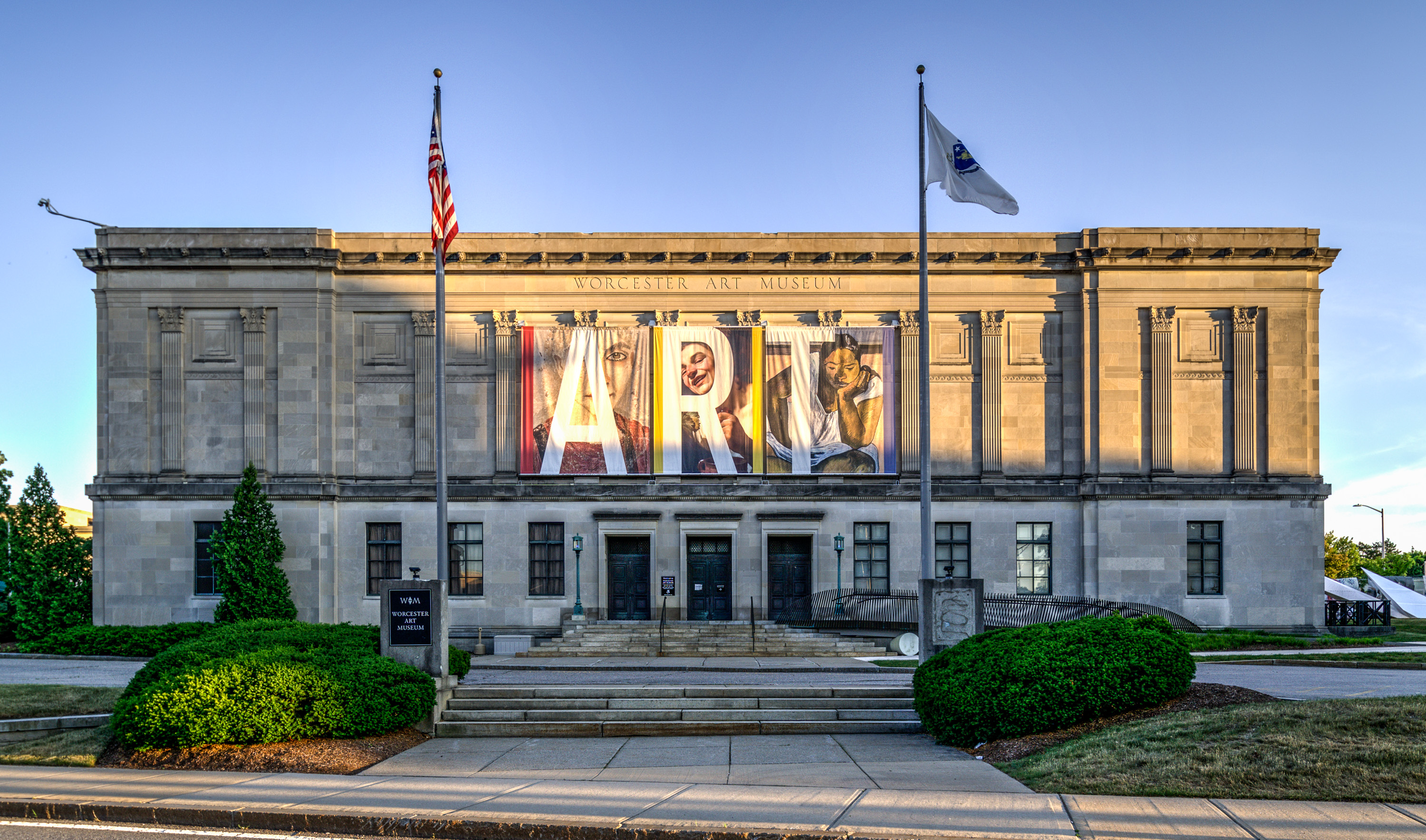
- Salisbury Street façade
- Interactive fullscreen map
- Established: 1898
- Location: 55 Salisbury Street; Worcester, Massachusetts
- Coordinates: 42°16′23″N 71°48′8″W
- Type: Art museum
- Director: Matthias Waschek
- Architect: Stephen C. Earle
- Public transit access: MBTA Framingham/Worcester Line Worcester
- Website: Worcester Art Museum

The Worcester Art Museum houses over 38,000 works of art dating from antiquity to the present day and representing cultures from all over the world. The museum opened in 1898 in Worcester, Massachusetts. Its holdings include Roman mosaics, European and American art, and a major collection of Japanese prints. Since acquiring the John Woodman Higgins Armory Collection in 2013, it is also home to the second largest collection of arms and armor in the Americas.

The museum houses collected architecture (the Chapter House, 1932), acquired paintings by Monet (1910) and Gauguin (1921), and presented photography as an art form (1904). The Worcester Art Museum also has a conservation lab and year-round studio art program for adults and youth.

== History ==
In September 1896, Stephen Salisbury III and a group of his friends founded the Art Museum Corporation to build an art institution "for the benefit of all." Salisbury then gave a tract of land, on what was once the Salisbury farm (now fronting Salisbury Street in Worcester, Massachusetts), as well as $100,000 USD to construct a building designed by Worcester architect Stephen C. Earle. The museum formally opened in 1898 with the Rev. Daniel Merriman as its first president. The museum's collection then consisted largely of plaster casts of "antique and Renaissance" sculptures, as well as a selection of 5,000 Japanese prints, drawings, and books, willed to the museum from John Chandler Bancroft, son of George Bancroft.

In 1905, Stephen Salisbury died and left the bulk of his five million-dollar estate to the museum. The Worcester Art Museum continued to grow, with some of the significant early works donated or loaned by the artist and collector Helen Bigelow Merriman.

Between 1932 and 1939, the Worcester Art Museum joined a consortium of museums and institutions to sponsor expeditions to the archaeological sites where the city of Antioch once stood. This group of museums, including Princeton University, the Musée du Louvre, the Baltimore Museum of Art, and Harvard University's affiliate, Dumbarton Oaks, discovered hundreds of intricate floor mosaics. The Antioch mosaics, as they are now known, were split up among the institutions. The Worcester Art Museum received many mosaics including the Worcester Hunt, which is now installed in the Renaissance Court's floor.

On May 17, 1972, the museum suffered a major theft of artwork. Two men wearing masks entered the museum just before closing. The two men stole The Brooding Woman and Head of a Woman by Paul Gauguin, Mother and Child by Pablo Picasso, and St. Bartholomew, then attributed to Rembrandt, a collection of works worth over one million dollars. Four individuals were charged with the theft as well as the theft of seven artworks stolen from the Boyden Library at Deerfield Academy.

In 2013, Worcester's Higgins Armory Museum closed its doors and its renowned collection of arms and armor was integrated into that of the Worcester Art Museum. The armor collection is second in size only to the Metropolitan Museum of Art, and qualitatively, it is said to rank with the collections in Chicago and Philadelphia.

A permanent arms and armor gallery was opened in November of 2025. Prior to that opening, major works from the Higgins collection were on view in galleries throughout the museum, alongside Greek, Roman, Asian, and European works of art. The museum also circulated a traveling exhibition of armor.

== Architecture ==
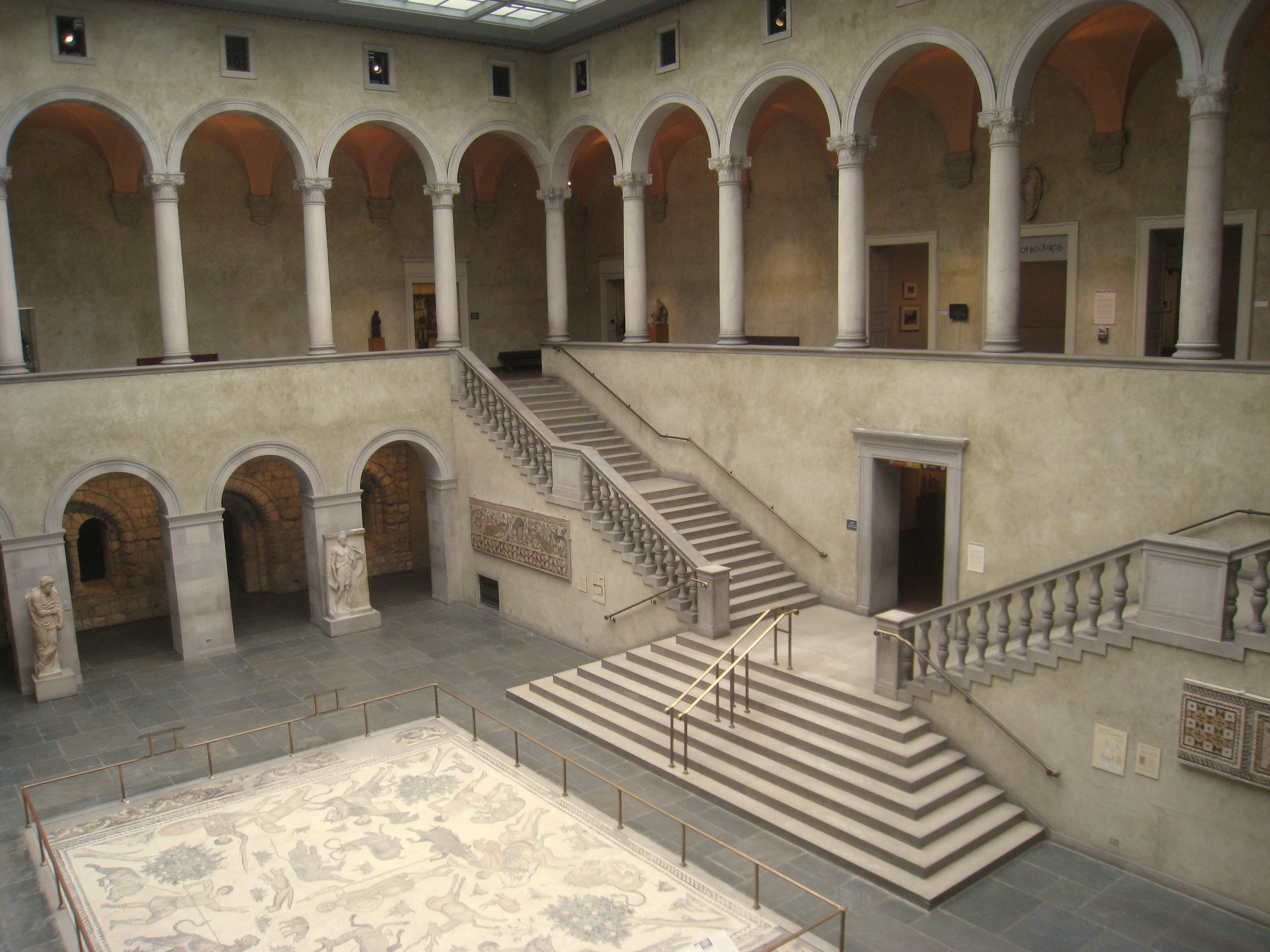
Museum interior

The Worcester Art Museum started as a small three-story building, designed by Stephen C. Earle of Earle & Fisher, and constructed by Norcross Brothers in 1897–98.[4] Very little of the exterior of this original building can be viewed due to the multiple expansions the museum has undertaken. From the start this was the expectation, as Stephen Salisbury and his architects planned the original building as the southern component of a larger structure, five times the size, which would have a central courtyard and front onto Salisbury Street. The first expansion was a rear wing in 1920–21, designed by one of the original architects, Clellan W. Fisher, in a matching style. The most distinctive addition was added in 1931–33 in the form of the large wing facing Salisbury Street. Designed to include the Chapter House and Renaissance Court, this addition was designed by William Truman Aldrich of Boston, an architect known for museums. This was followed in 1939-40 by the addition of a fourth floor to the original building, designed by G. Adolph Johnson of Worcester.

The next addition was not until 1970, thirty years later, when the Higgins Education Wing, designed by The Architects Collaborative, was added. This building added studios, classrooms, exhibition spaces and a new main entrance. The most recent major addition was the Frances L. Hiatt Wing, added in 1983 on the east side of the original building. Designed by Irwin A. Regent & Associates of Worcester, it is intended for special exhibitions. These later buildings, though they do not match the style of the earlier buildings, are complementary to them in material and color. In November 2015, the museum unveiled a new walkway ramp at the Salisbury Street entrance. Designed by Kulapat Yantrasast of wHY Architects, the bridge-like structure boldly combines contemporary design with the museum's 1933 Beaux-Arts exterior while making the historic main entrance fully accessible.

In 1927, the museum purchased a 12th-century French chapter house that was originally part of the Benedictine Priory of St. John at Bas-Nueil, in the commune of Berrie, Vienne in France. Installed in 1932, and linked to the museum in 1933 via the grand Renaissance Court, the chapter house was one of the first medieval buildings to be transported from Europe to America. The remaining portion of the priory at Bas-Nueil was designated a monument historique in 1988. Decorating the Renaissance Court floor is one of Worcester's greatest ancient treasures – a group of Antioch mosaics dating from the first through the sixth century A.D, which was excavated at Antioch in Syria.

== Collection ==
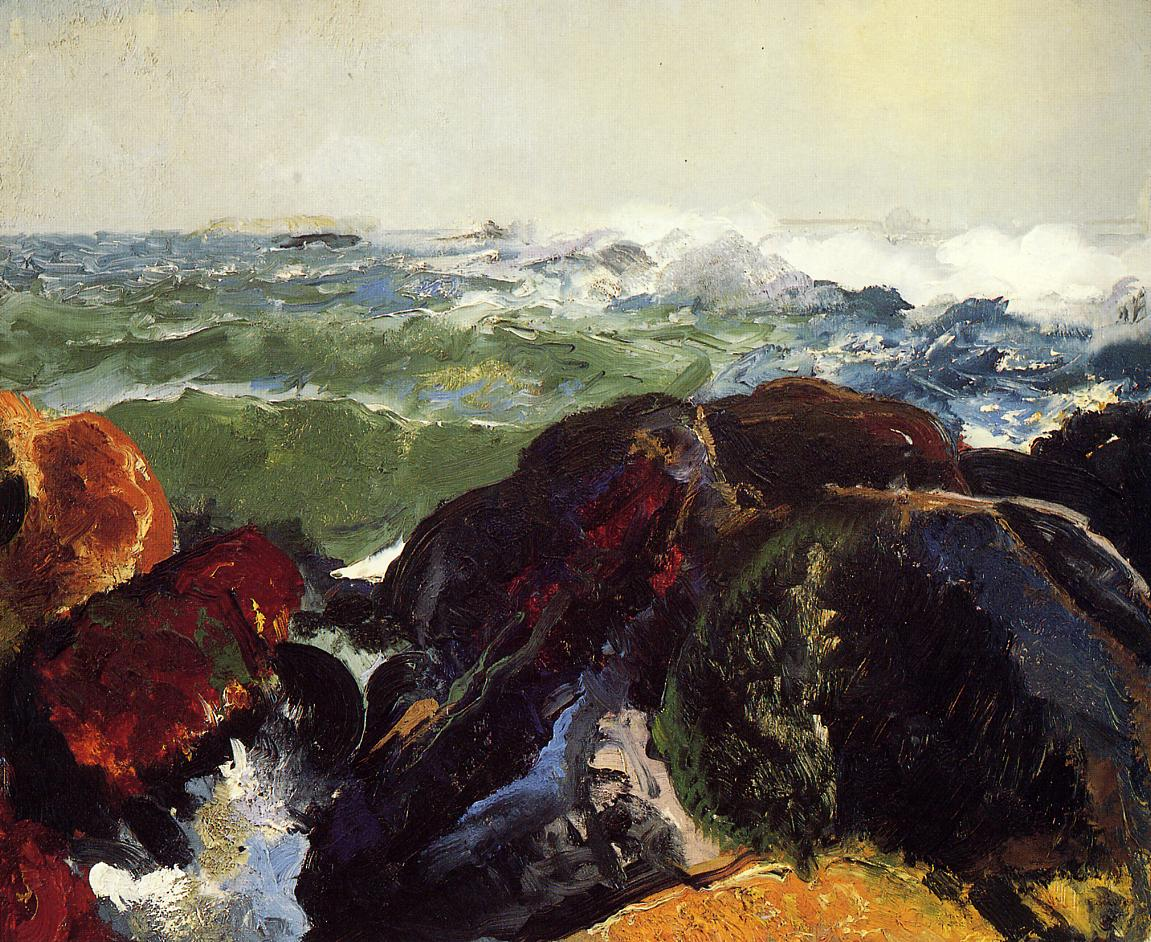
Monhegan Island, George Wesley Bellows, Worcester Art Museum

In addition to the Roman, mosaic-laden, Renaissance court and French chapter house, strengths of the permanent collection include collections of European and North American painting, prints, photographs, and drawings; Asian art; Greek and Roman sculpture and mosaics; and Contemporary art.

European paintings include some Flemish Renaissance paintings, an El Greco, a Rembrandt, a Burne-Jones, and a room of Impressionist and 20th-century works by Monet, Matisse, Renoir, Gauguin, and Kandinsky. The American painting collection includes works by Thomas Cole, Winslow Homer, John Singer Sargent, William Morris Hunt, Elizabeth Goodridge, among others. In the 20th-century gallery, the Museum displays works by Franz Kline, Jackson Pollock, and Joan Mitchell.

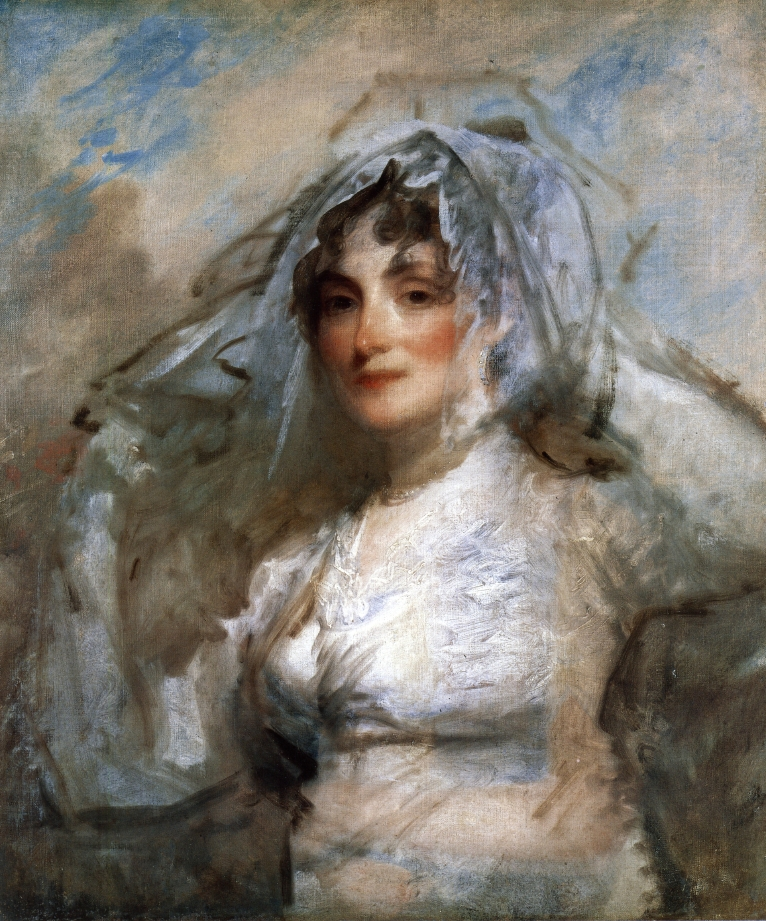
Unfinished portrait of his muse Sarah Wentworth Apthorp Morton, one of several portraits by Gilbert Stuart in the Worcester Art Museum

In 1901, John Chandler Bancroft, a wealthy Bostonian, bequeathed more than 3,000 Japanese prints. The Bancroft Collection spans the history of woodcut printmaking in Japan, with particular strength in rare, early images from the late 17th and 18th centuries. Salisbury's estate donation included many portraits commissioned by his family, as well as sculpture, furniture, and silver. These works, by artists such as Gilbert Stuart, Thomas Crawford, and Samuel F.B. Morse and the craftsmen Paul Revere, Edward Winslow, and Nathanial Hurd, constituted the nucleus of the American collections.

=== American Art ===
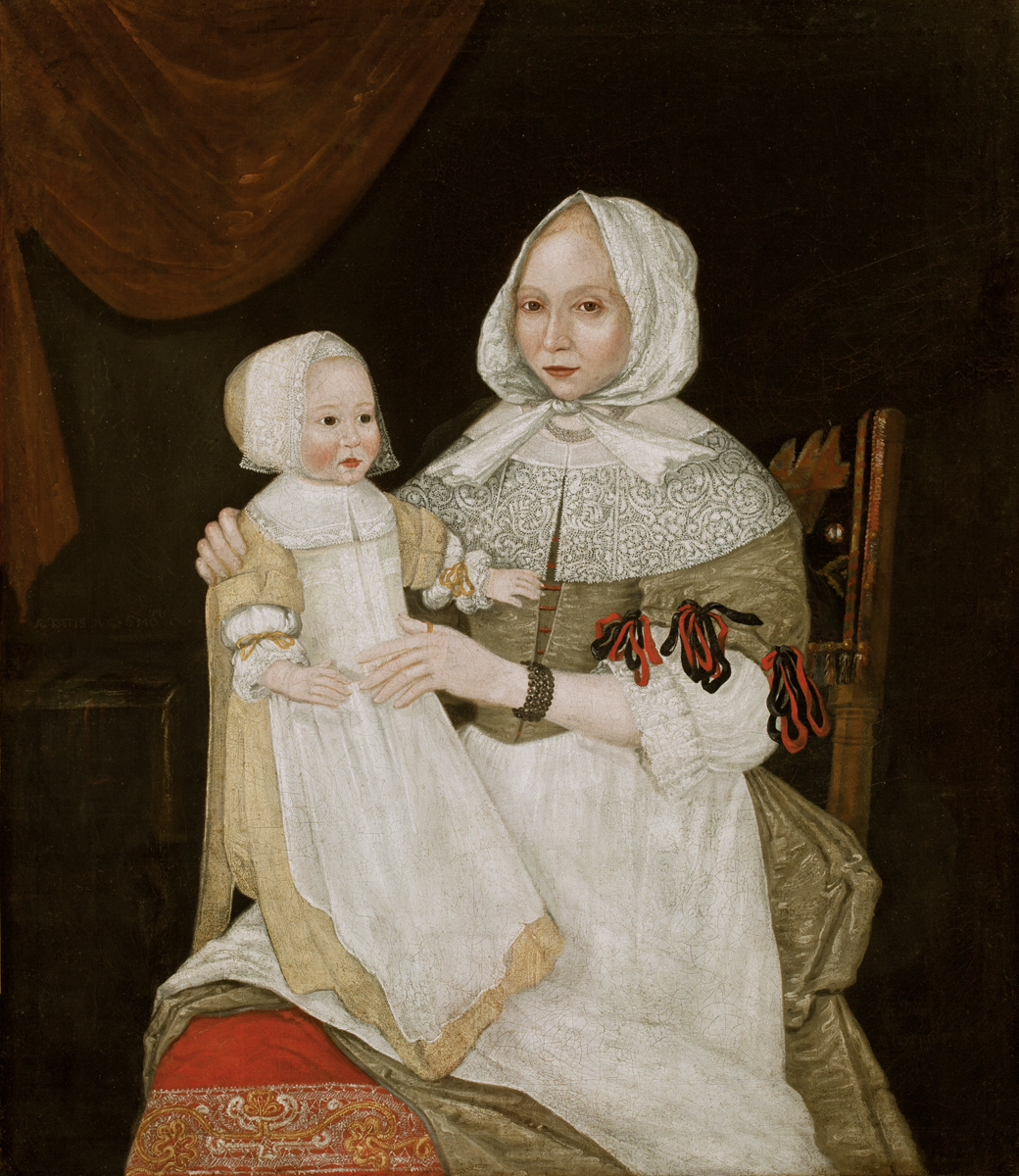
Freake-Gibbs Painter, Elizabeth Clarke Freake (Mrs. John Freake) and Baby Mary, 1671–1674

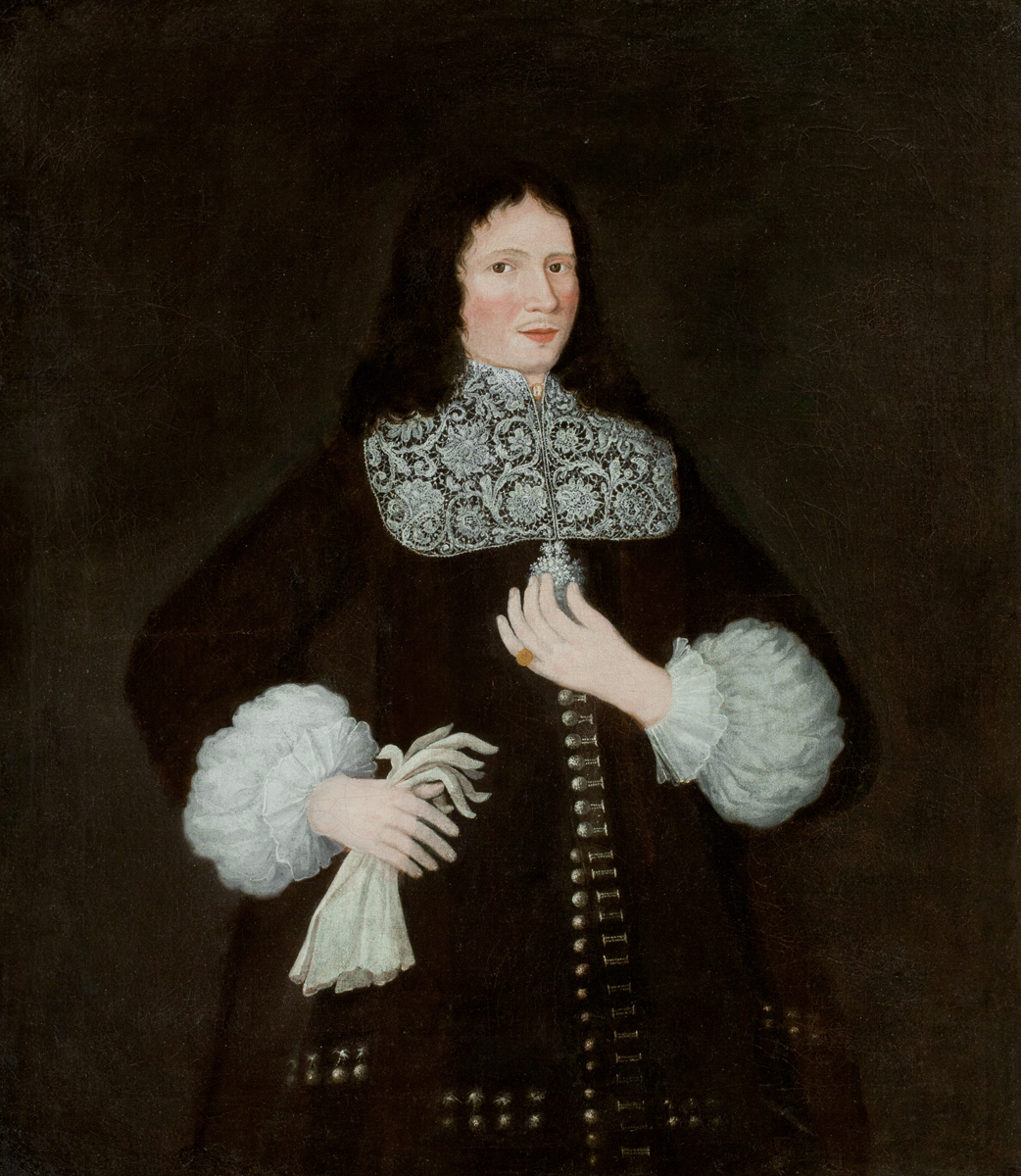
Freake-Gibbs Painter, John Freake, 1671–1674

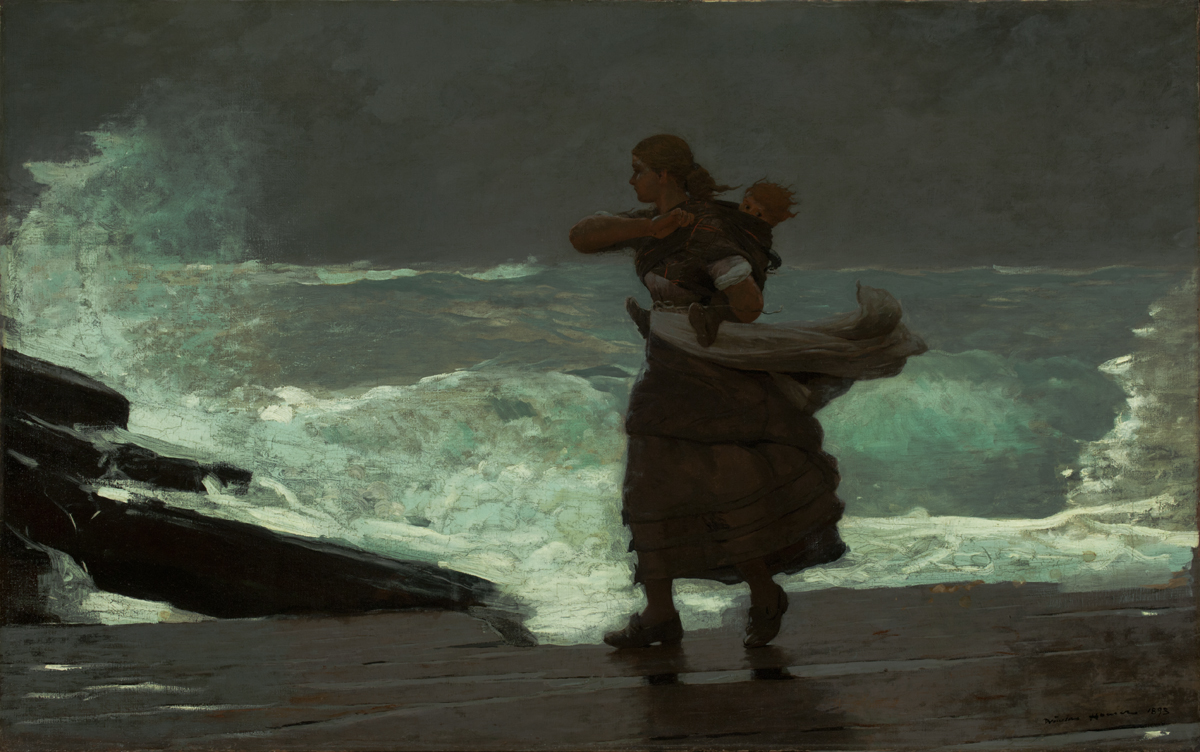
Winslow Homer, The Gale, 1883–1893

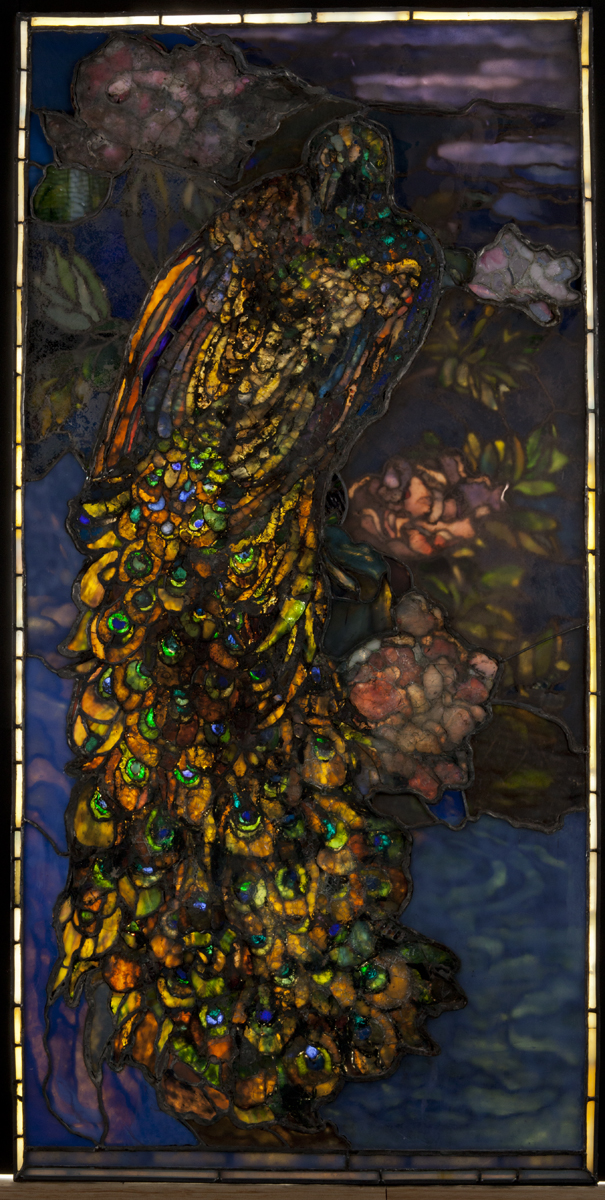
John La Farge, Peacock Window, 1892–1908

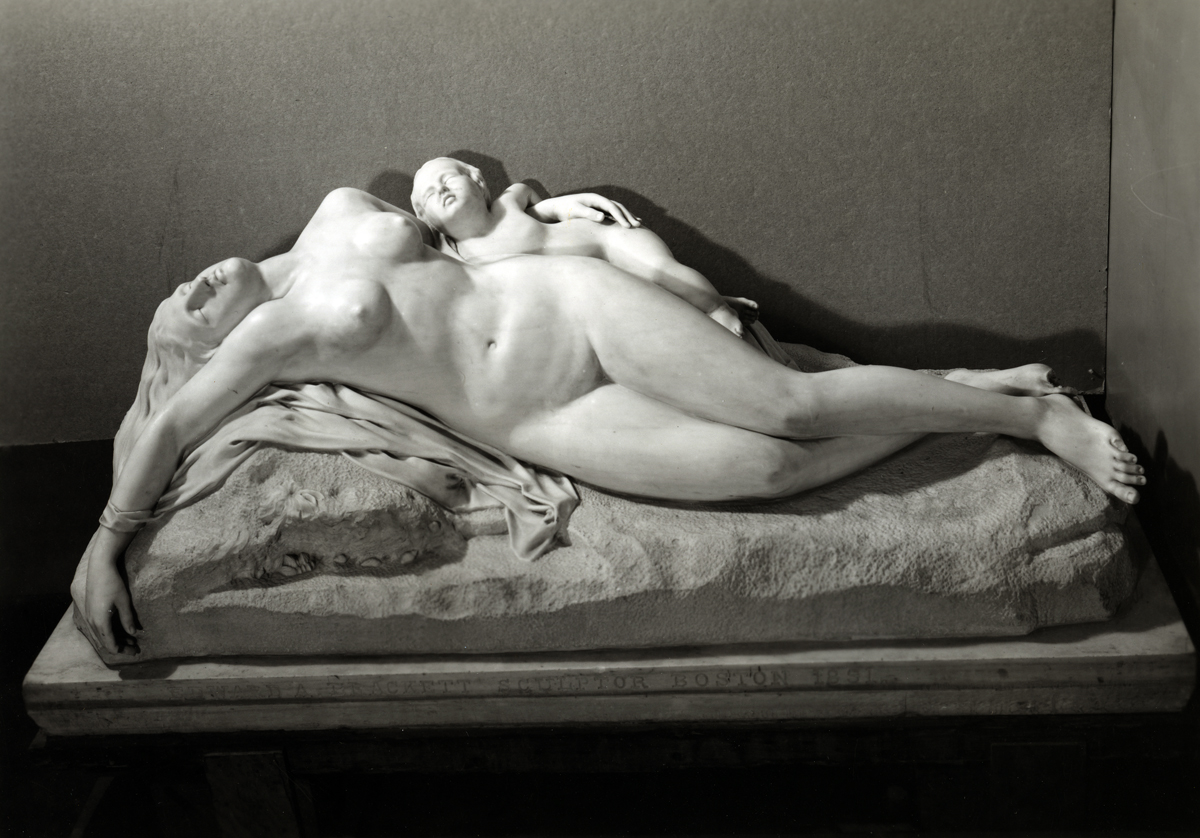
Edward Augustus Brackett, Shipwrecked Mother and Child, 1848-1851

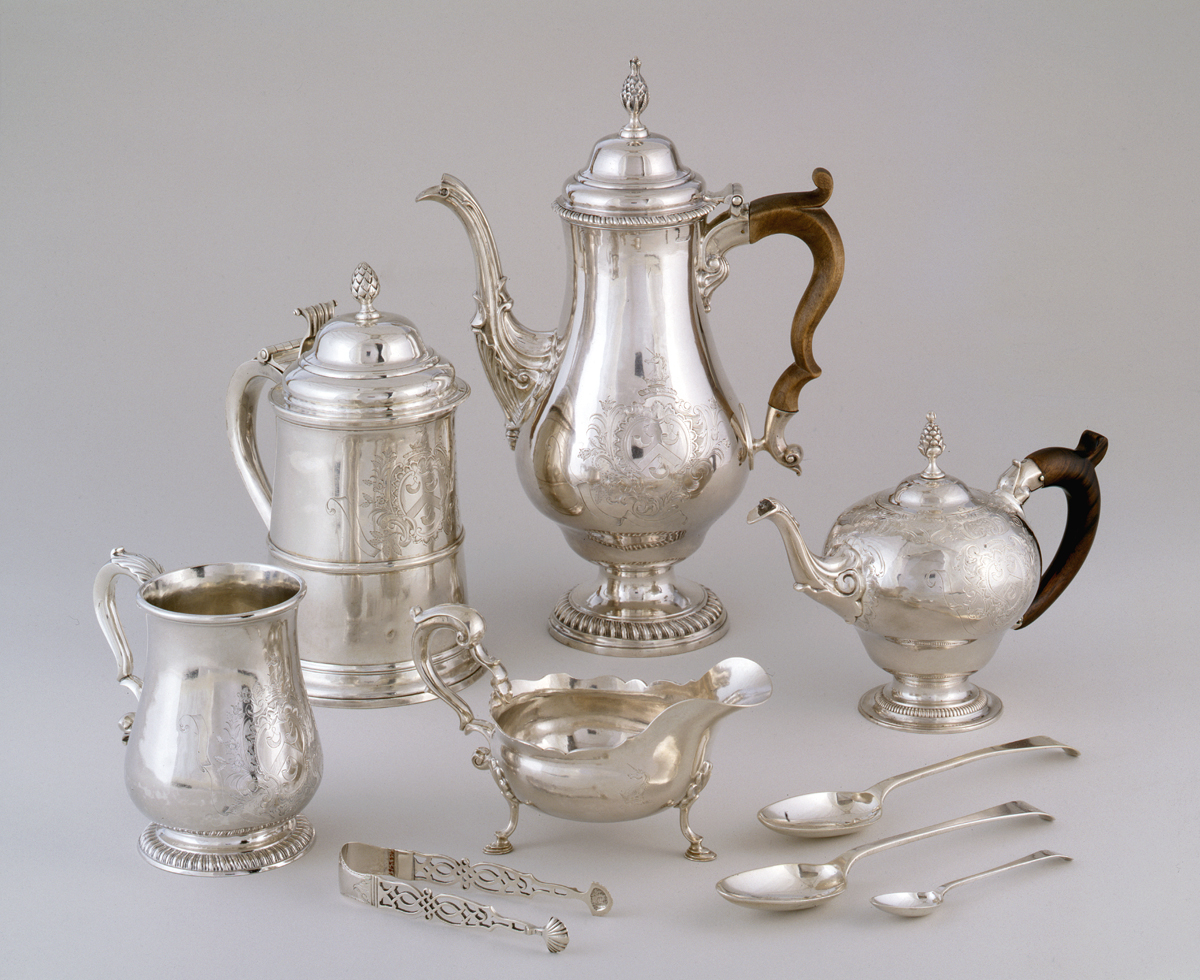
Paul Revere, Paine Service, 1773

=== European Art ===
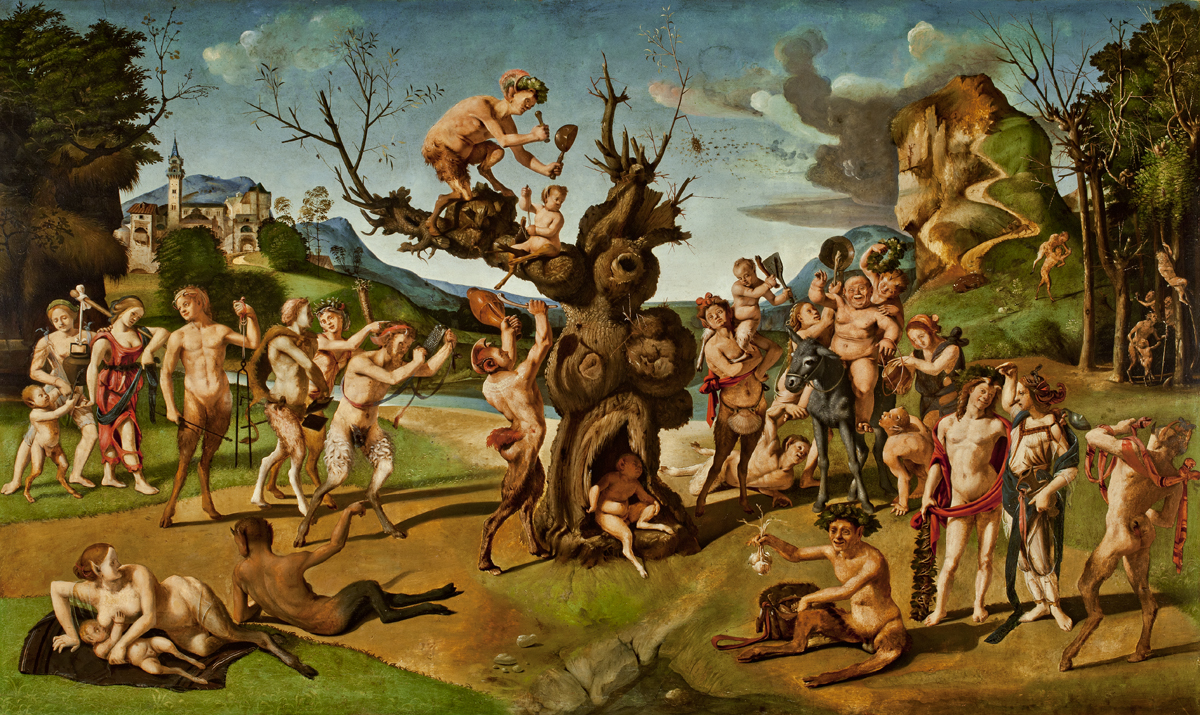
Piero di Cosimo, The Discovery of Honey by Bacchus, about 1499

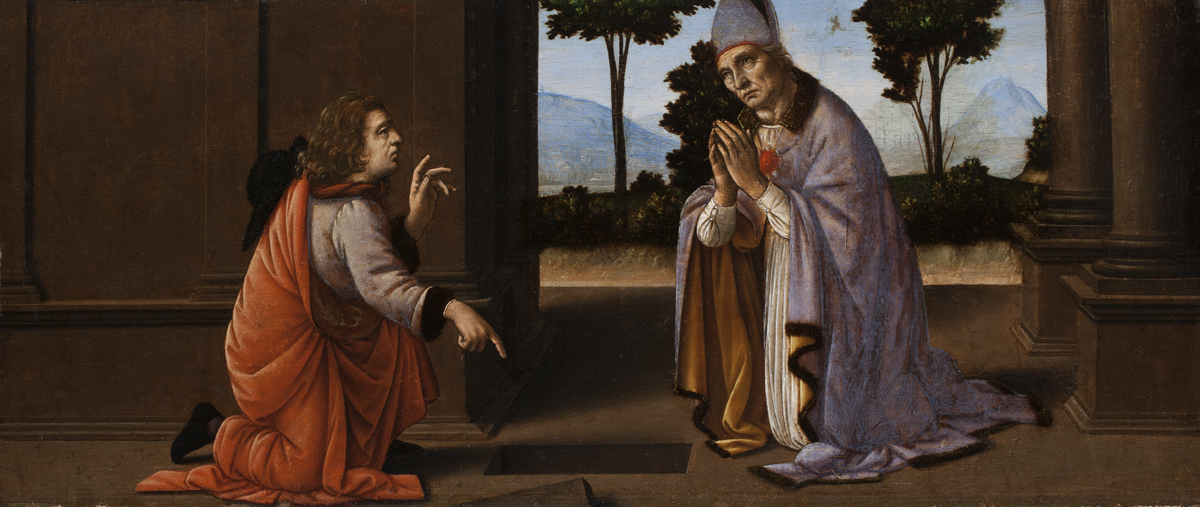
Attributed to Leonardo da Vinci and Lorenzo di Credi, A Miracle of Saint Donatus of Arezzo, about 1479

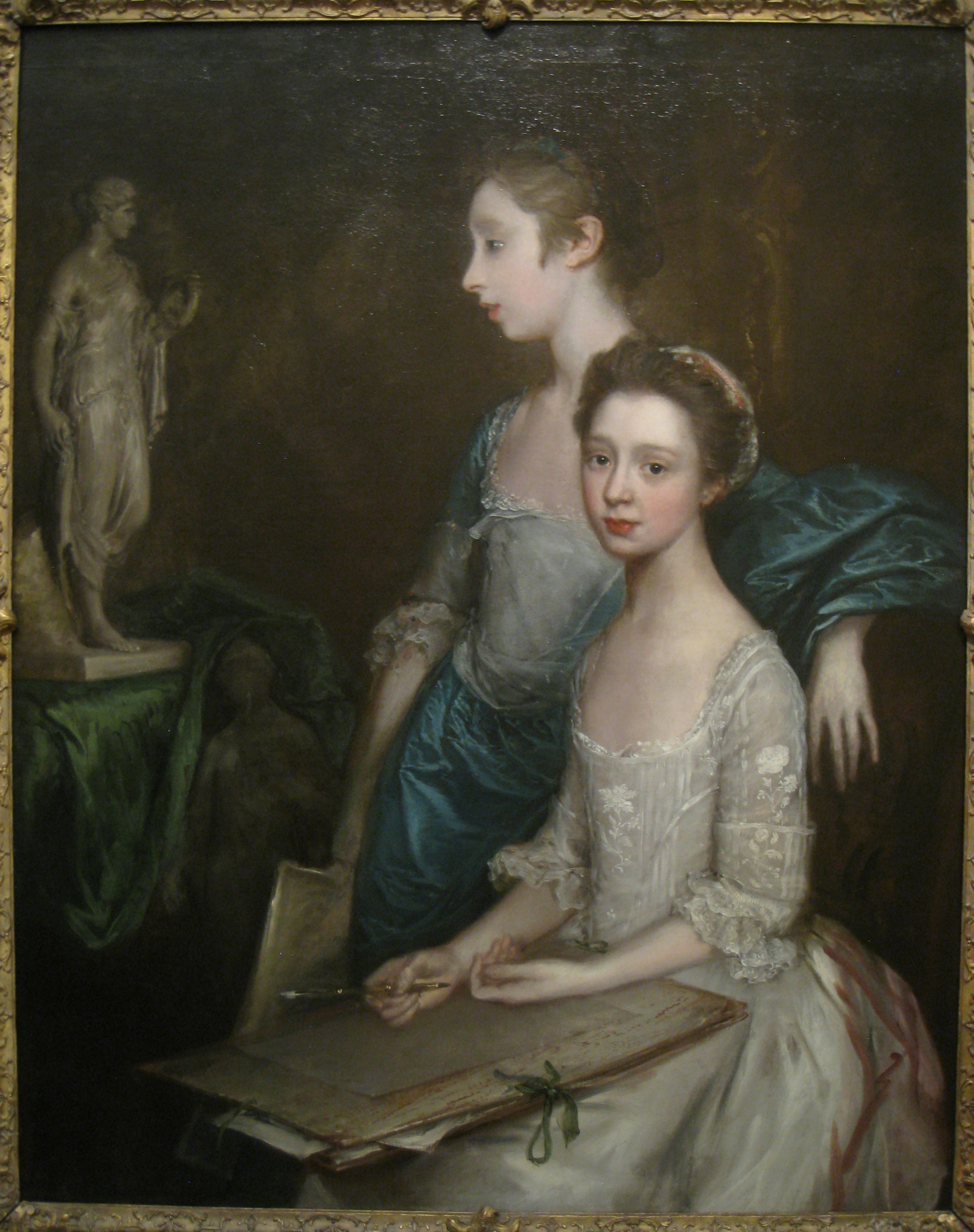
Thomas Gainsborough, Portrait of the Artist's Daughters, 1763–64

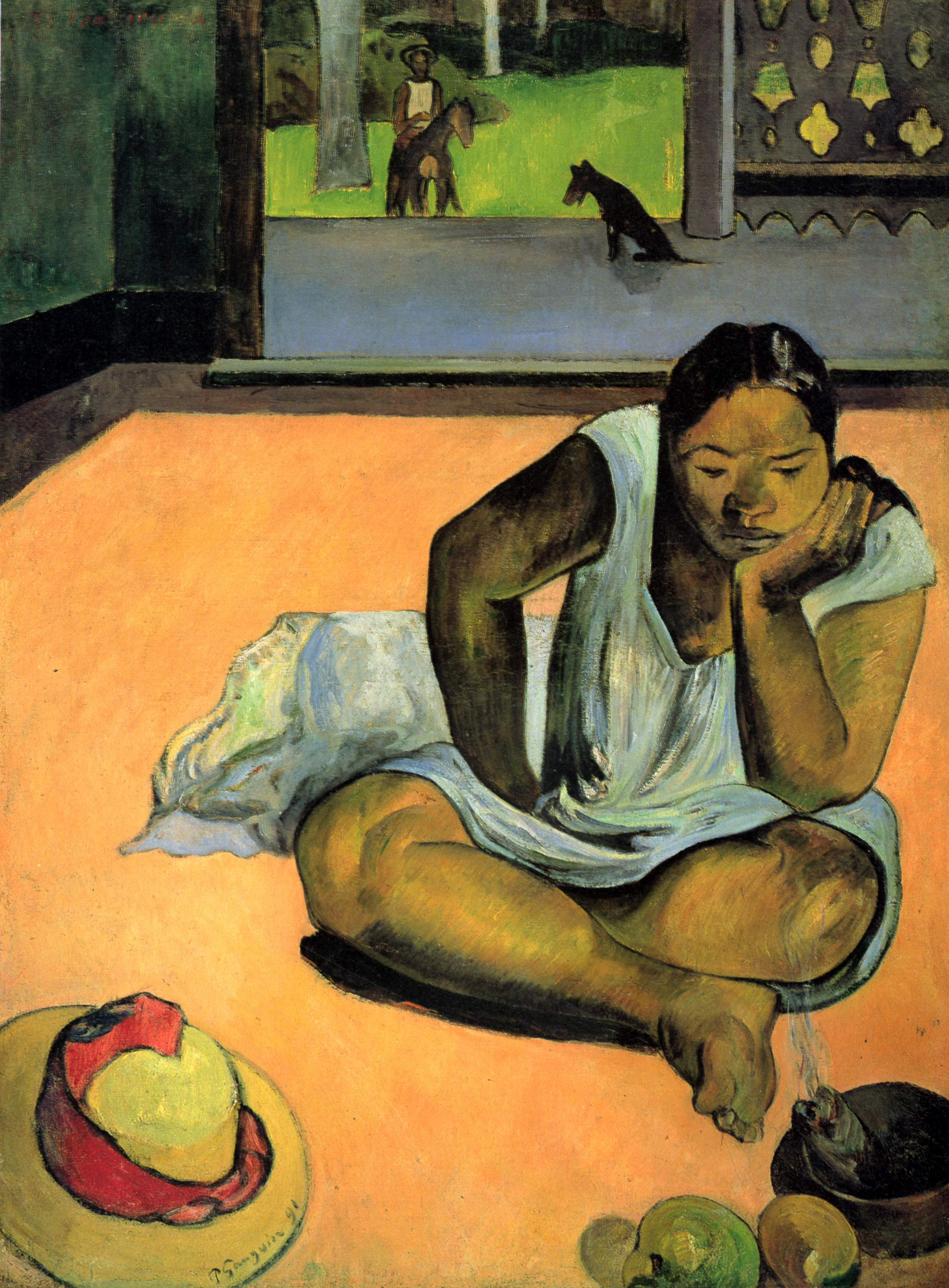
Paul Gauguin, Te Faaturuma (The Brooding Woman), 1891

=== Asian Art ===
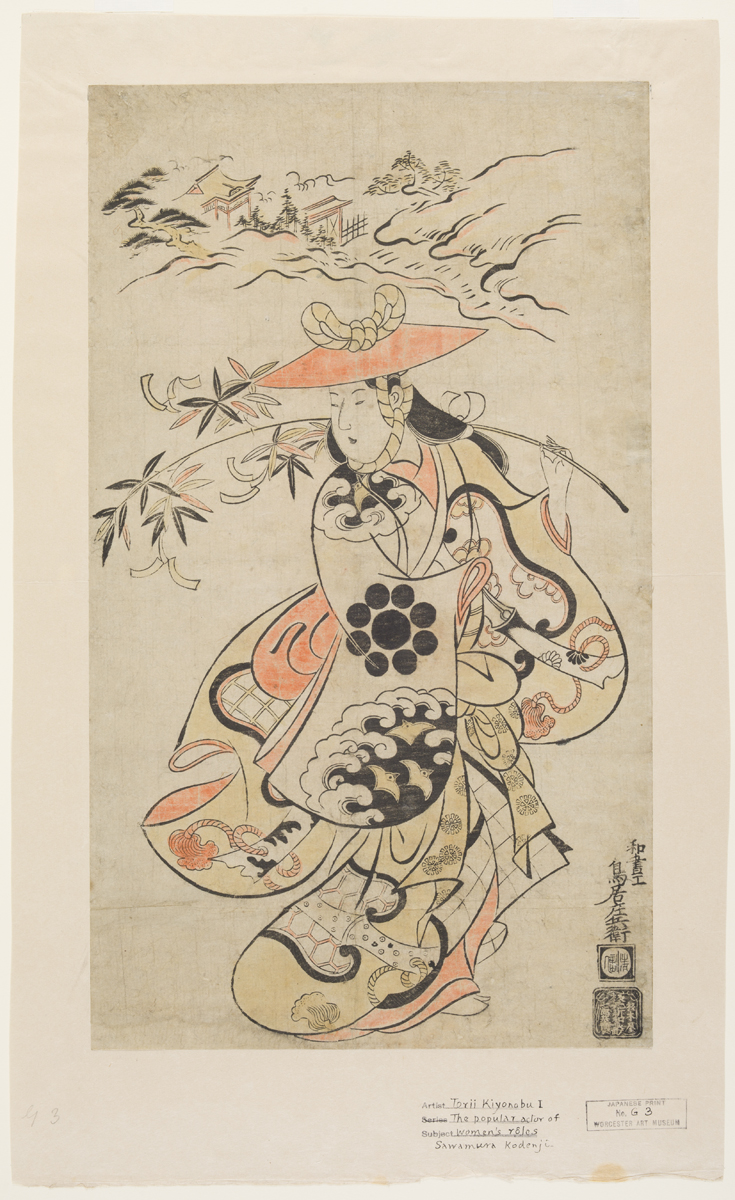
Torii Kiyonobu I, Actor Sawamura Kodenji I as Tsuyu-no-Mae, 1698

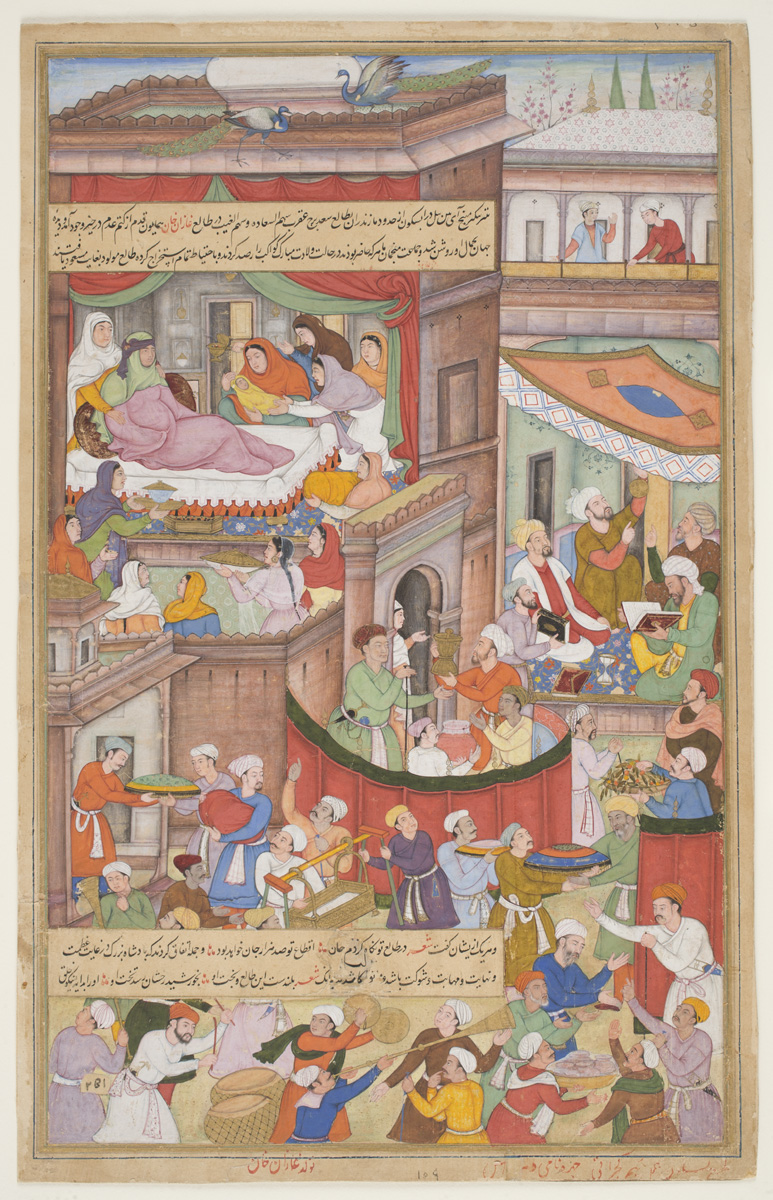
Mughal (Basawan), Birth of Ghazan Khan, from a manuscript of the "Jami'al-Tawarikh" by Rashid al-Din (1247-1318), about 1596

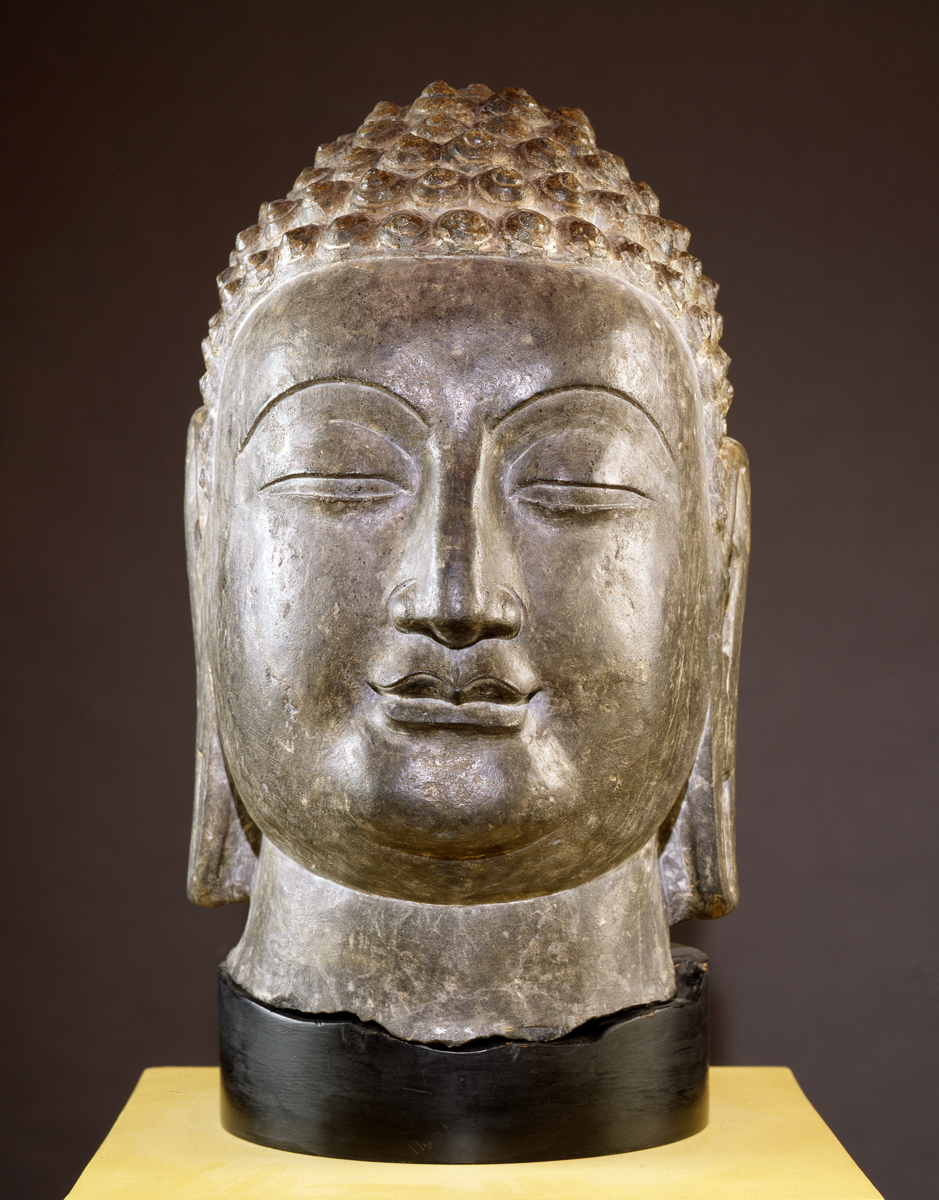
Chinese, Northern Wei Dynasty, Head of a Buddha, 550–770

=== Arms and Armor ===
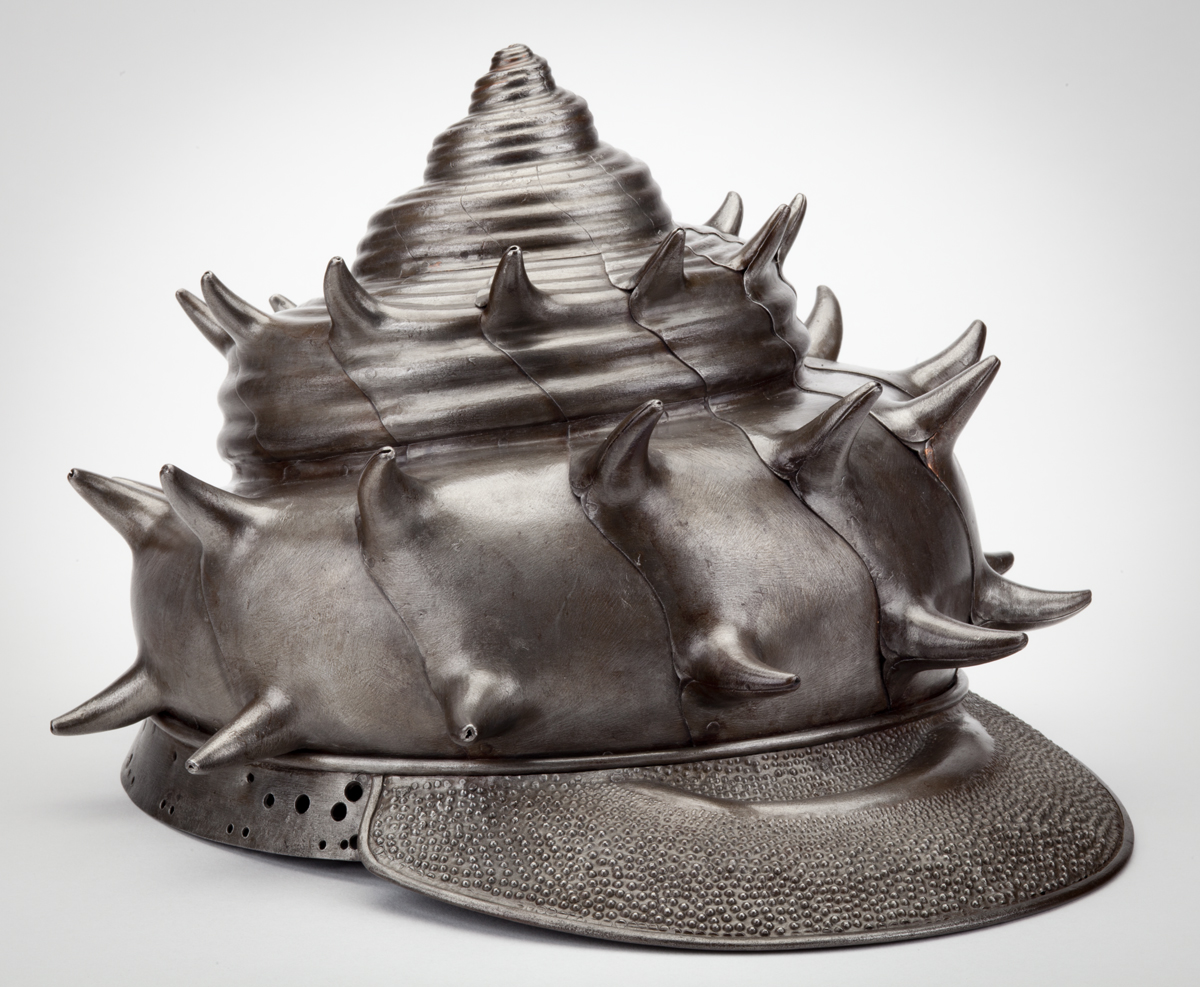
Nagasone Tojiro Mitsumasa, Helmet in the form of a Sea Conch Shell, 1618

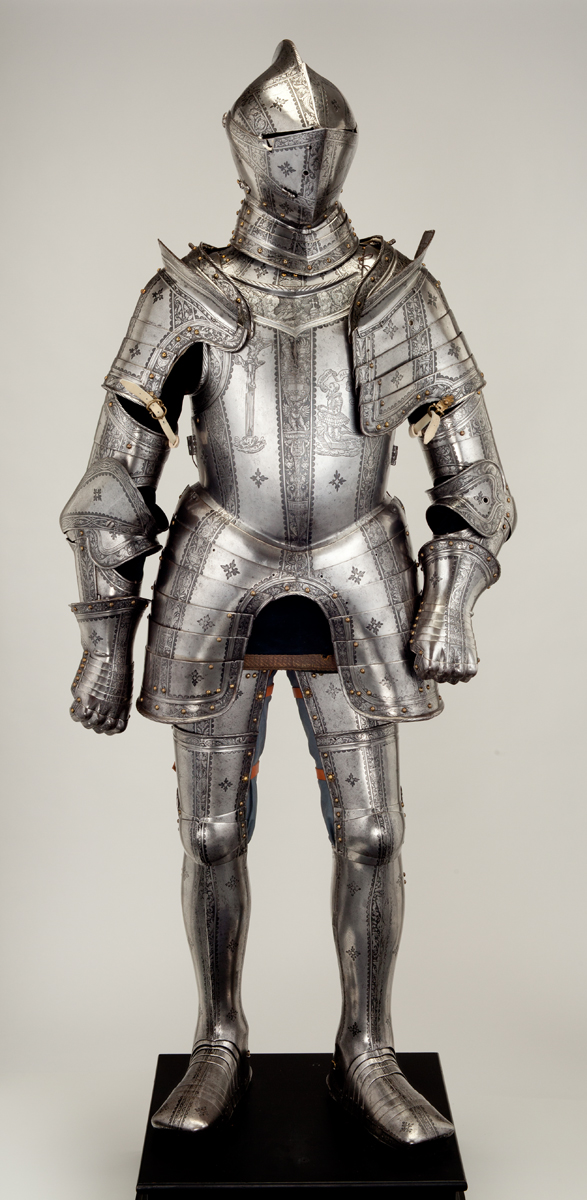
Stefan Rormoser, Armor for Field and Tilt, of Count Franz von Teuffenbach (1516-1578), 1554

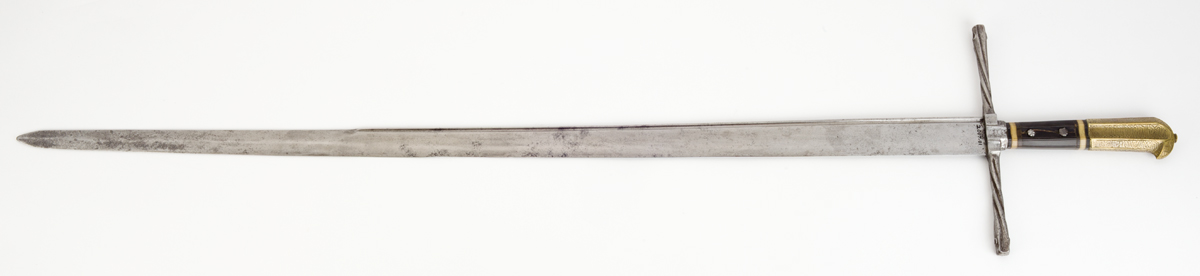
Workshop of Hans Sumersperger, "Gothic" Hunting Sword, about 1490–1500

== Provenance research and returns ==
In January 2025, the Worcester Art Museum reached an agreement with the Italian culture ministry to return two ancient Greek vessels—a black-figure amphora (c. 515–500 BCE) and a black-figure kylix (c. 500 BCE)—that had been looted from Italy. The artifacts, previously acquired through the dealer Robert Hecht, were identified as stolen property by Daniel W. Healey, the museum’s provenance researcher.

As part of the agreement, the vessels will remain on display at the museum for four to eight years with labels acknowledging their illicit origins before their repatriation. In return, Italy will provide a rotating loan of comparable antiquities. This initiative follows the museum’s efforts to assess the provenance of its collection, particularly concerning acquisitions from the 20th century.

== Directors ==
- Philip J. Gentner 1908–1917
- Raymond Wyer (changed his name in 1923 to Raymond Henniker-Heaton) 1918–1925
- George W. Eggers 1926–1930
- Francis Henry Taylor 1931–1939
- Charles H. Sawyer 1940–1947
- Louisa Dresser Campbell (acting director) 1943–1946
- George L. Stout 1947–1955
- Francis Henry Taylor 1955–1957
- Daniel Catton Rich 1958–1970
- Richard Stuart Teitz 1970–1981
- Tom L. Freudenheim 1982–1986
- James A. Welu 1986–2011
- Matthias Waschek 2011 –

== Management ==
The Worcester Art Museum operates on a $10M annual budget and is governed by an active 25-member Board of Trustees, made up of local, national, and international members with expertise in finance, investment, museum management, art history, education, and real estate development. In addition, it has a 200-member Corporation and over 3,000 members and 100 Business Partners. It employs 65 full-time and 128 part-time personnel (including 56 professional artist faculty) and enlists hundreds of volunteers and docents. In November 2017, the Museum was awarded reaccreditation by the American Alliance for Museums.
