= Daniel Catton Rich =

Daniel Catton Rich (April 16 1904–15 October 1976) was an American art curator, museum administrator, and educator. A leading advocate for modern art, he served as director of the Art Institute of Chicago and the Worcester Art Museum.

== Career ==
He studied at the University of Chicago (graduating in 1926) and at Harvard University for one year of post-graduate studies in English and fine arts.

Rich came to the Art Institute of Chicago in 1927 as editor of the Art Institute Bulletin.

In 1929, he became assistant curator of painting and sculpture under Robert Harshe and was promoted in 1931 to associate curator of painting and sculpture. In 1938, Rich was named chief curator and director of fine arts. He curated the exhibit "Art for the Public by Chicago Artists," a project of the Works Progress Administration, Federal Art Project (July 28-October 3).

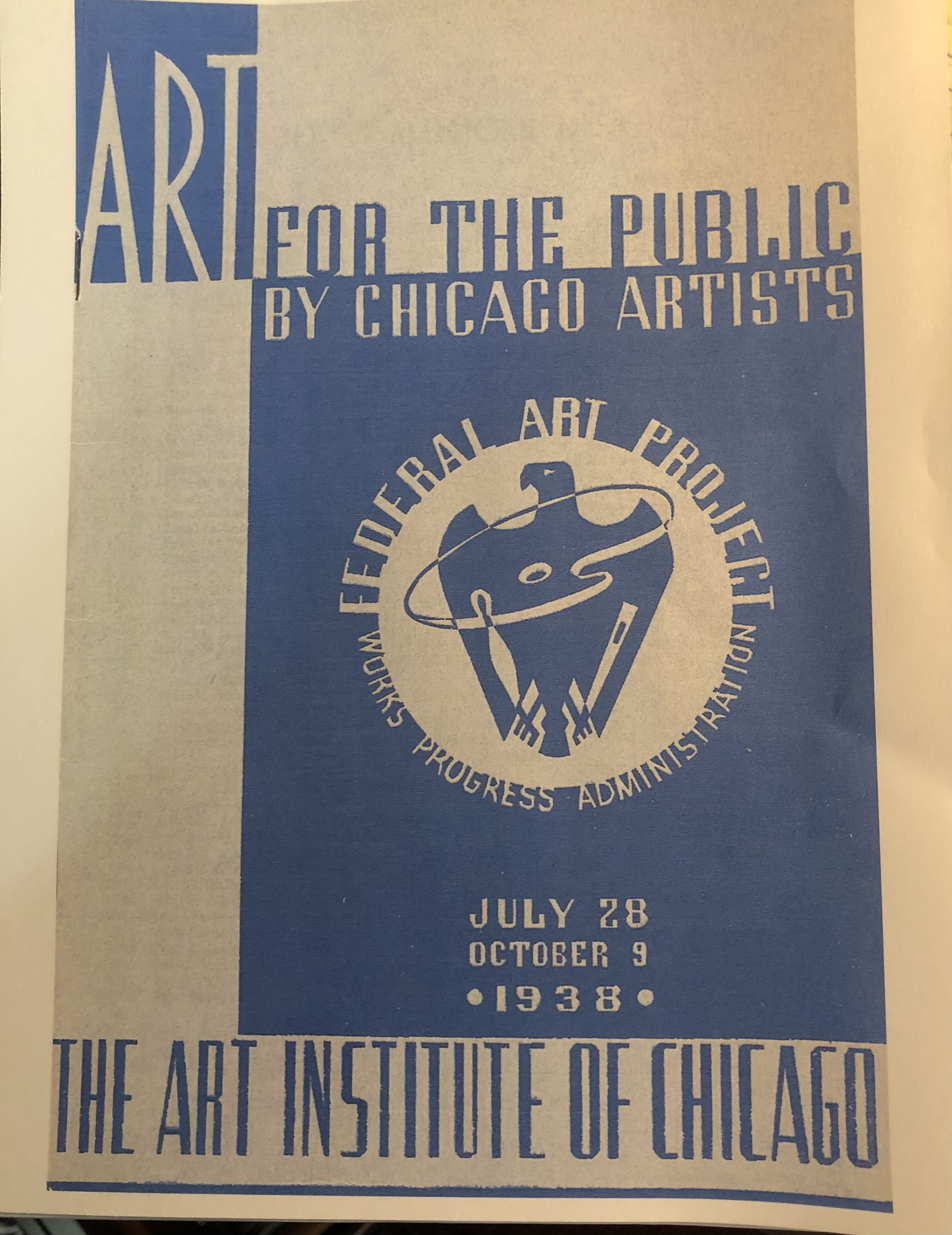
Art Institute Exhibit Federal Art Project artists in Chicago July 28-Oct.9,1938

In 1958, he became director of the Worcester Art Museum in Worcester, Massachusetts. After his retirement in 1970, Rich served as director emeritus until his death in New York City in 1976.

Outside the museum he served on the Committee of the Federal Arts Project, the Advisory Committee on Art for the Department of State, and the Committee for the Restoration of Italian Monuments. He was also active in the Association of American Museums and served as President of that organization.

He was president of Poetry Magazine in 1952, as well as a published poet in that magazine. In 1960-61, he served as visiting lecturer in art history at Harvard. He was decorated by foreign governments including the Legion d’Honneur (France), the order of Orange Nassau (Netherlands), and the Cavalieri Order Merit (Italy).

== Personal life ==
Daniel Catton Rich was born in South Bend, Indiana. In 1927, he married Bertha Ten Eyck James.

== Publications ==
Degas. The Library of Great Painters (1951). Harry N. Abrams, Inc., Publishing. New York, N.Y. 125 pp. [with additional reprints and editions]

The Flow of Art: Essays and Criticisms (Henry McBride Series in Modernism and Modernity) McBride, Henry.

Georgia O'Keeffe

Picasso: His Later Works, 1938-1961
