= Clellan W. Fisher =

American architect (1861–1931)

- Born: October 14, 1861; Barre, Vermont, U.S.
- Died: August 8, 1932 (aged 70); Danville, Vermont, U.S.
- Occupation: Architect
- Awards: Fellow, American Institute of Architects (1894)

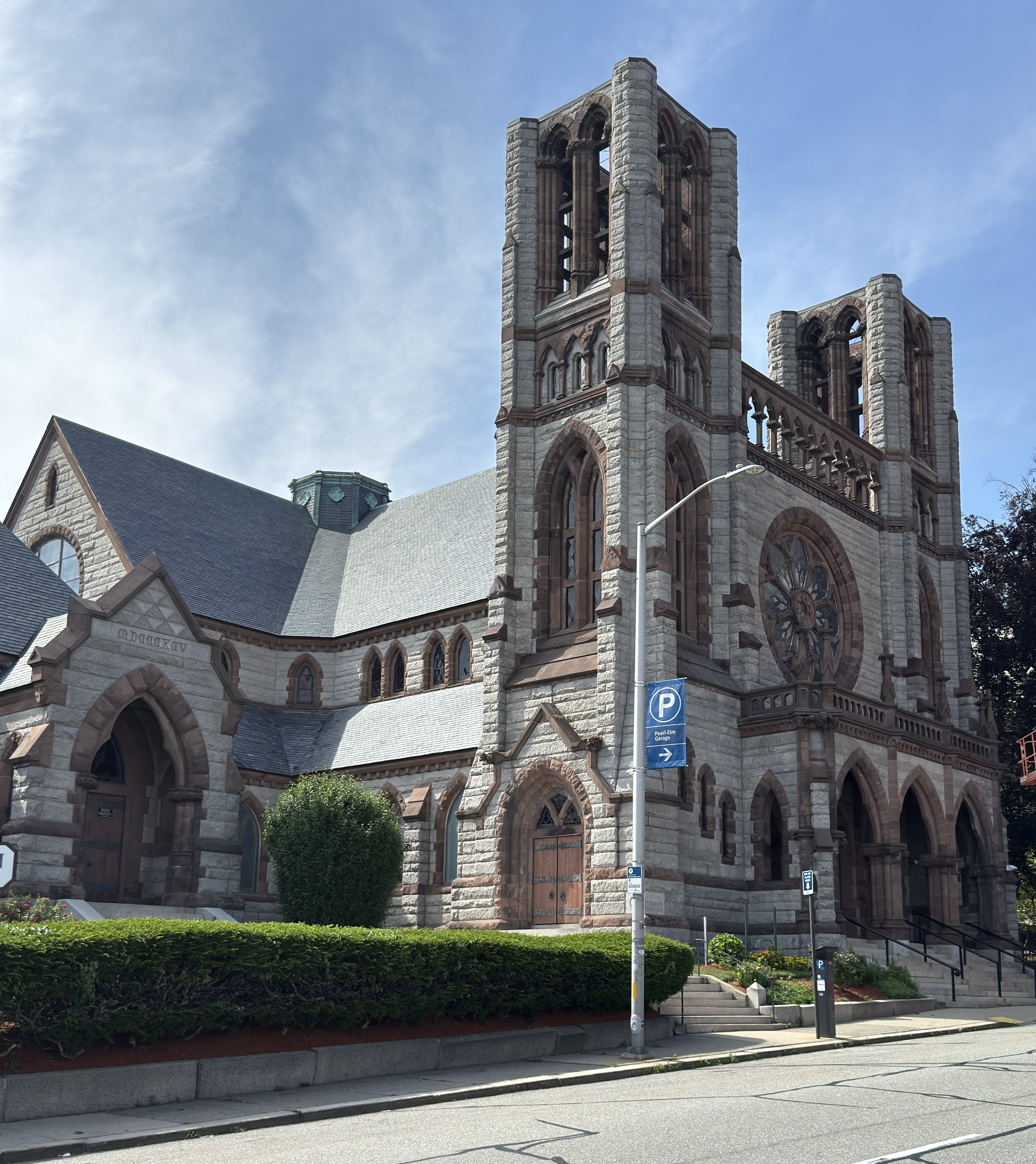
The Union Congregational Church in Worcester, designed by Earle & Fisher in the Gothic Revival style and completed in 1897

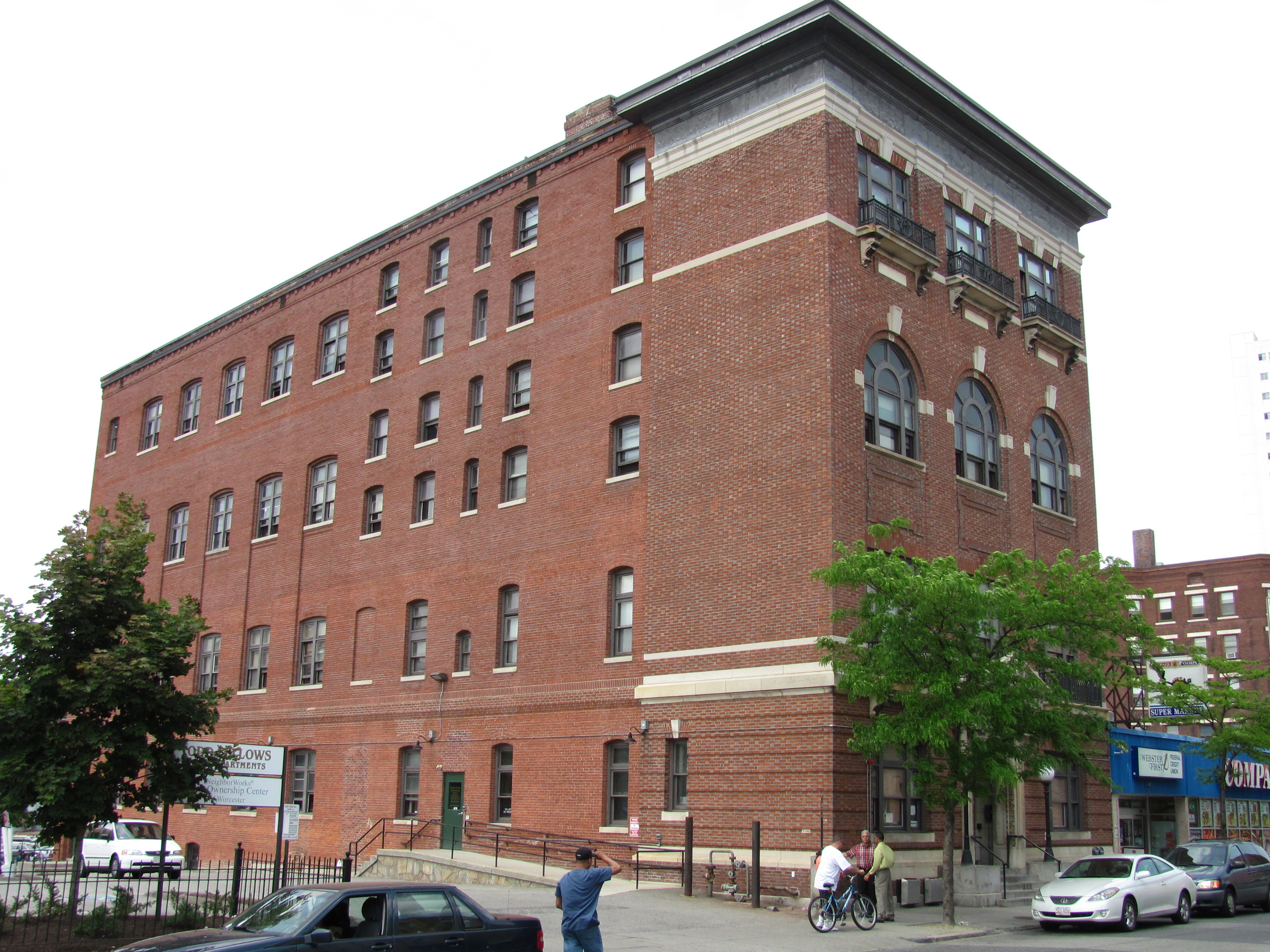
The IOOF Building in Worcester, designed by Fisher in the Neoclassical style and completed in 1906

Clellan W. Fisher (October 14, 1861 – August 8, 1932) was an American architect. He began practice in Burlington, Vermont, in the late nineteenth century before relocating to Worcester, Massachusetts, in 1891 to join the practice of established architect Stephen C. Earle. After 1903 he practiced independently in Worcester until his retirement in 1928.

== Life and career ==
Clellan Waldo Fisher was born October 14, 1861, in Barre, Vermont, to Alfred B. Fisher, a carpenter, and Ursula Fisher, née Holmes. Over the next two decades, Alfred Fisher obtained success as a contractor and was the builder of prominent buildings such as The Pavilion (1876, demolished) in Montpelier. A. B. Fisher drew the plans for many of the buildings he built and by 1881 was confident enough to open an office as an architect in Burlington, where the family had moved in 1878. His works in Burlington included the Howard Mortuary Chapel (1882, NRHP-listed) at Lakeview Cemetery. Clellan Fisher was educated at Barre Academy and the University of Vermont, graduating in 1884. At the University of Vermont Fisher was a member of the Phi Delta Theta fraternity and was the lyricist of "Champlain," the former College Song.

By April 1884, Fisher had joined his father's businesses as a junior partner. A. B. Fisher had formally divided his architecture and contracting businesses, and operated as A. B. Fisher & Company, contractors and builders, and A. B. Fisher & Son, architects. Together the Fishers designed the Barre Opera House (1885, burned 1898) and the former Ethan Allen Engine Company No. 4 (1887, NRHP-listed) in Burlington. In March 1887 Fisher relocated to Albany, New York, to join architects Fuller & Wheeler. Shortly thereafter that firm was hired to design the new Burlington YMCA (1889, demolished). Fisher returned to Burlington in December 1888 and began practice for himself. His independent works in Burlington include the Weller Block (1889) on Church Street and the Burlington Trust Company Building (1891) on College Street.

In 1891 Fisher moved to Worcester, Massachusetts, where he joined the firm of established architect Stephen C. Earle as a partner. They worked together under the name Earle & Fisher until they dissolved their partnership in 1903. Their most prominent works were the Union Congregational Church (1897, NRHP-listed), modeled on Notre-Dame de Paris, and the original building of the Worcester Art Museum (1898), now mostly hidden by later additions. From 1903 until his retirement in 1928 Fisher practiced independently. His independent works included the IOOF Building (1906, NRHP-listed) and the first of the many additions to the Worcester Art Museum (1921). He retired from practice in 1928.

== Personal life and death ==
In 1884 Fisher was married to Mae Bickford of Barre. They had two children, both daughters. In 1930 Fisher and his wife moved to Santa Barbara, California. In 1932 they returned east, intending to spend the summer with friends in rural Danville, Vermont. He soon became ill and died August 8 at the age of 70.

In 1894 Fisher joined the American Institute of Architects (AIA) as a Fellow.
