= Erastus Brigham Bigelow =

American inventor of weaving machines

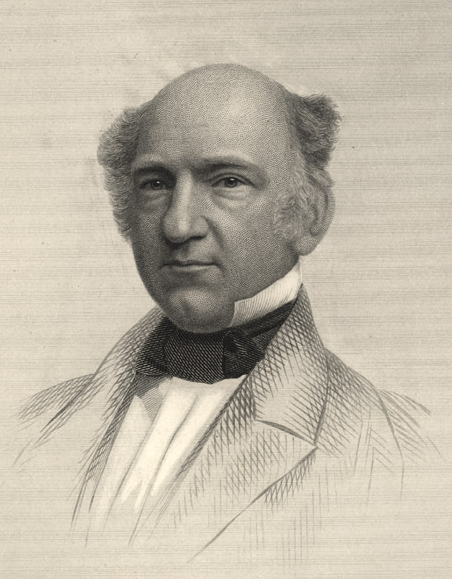
- Erastus Brigham Bigelow
- Born: April 2, 1814; West Boylston, Massachusetts
- Died: December 6, 1879 (aged 65); Boston, Massachusetts

Signature
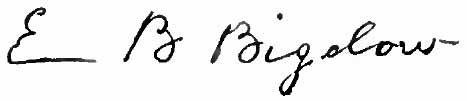

Erastus Brigham Bigelow (April 2, 1814 – December 6, 1879) was an American inventor of weaving machines.

== Beginnings ==
Erastus Bigelow was born in West Boylston, Massachusetts. He was the son of a cotton weaver, and it was his parents' desire that he should become a physician, but, his father's business not being successful, he was unable to continue his studies, and so turned his attention to inventing. He showed an inventive genius at the early age of 14, when he invented a machine to manufacture piping cord, for which he received $100. Before he had reached the age of 18, he had devised a handloom for suspender webbing. His work on Stenography, a short manual on shorthand writing, was written and published about this time. In 1838, he invented a power loom for weaving knotted counterpanes, and later a power loom to weave coach lace and took his brother, Horatio, in with him.

== Carpets ==
In 1839 he contracted to produce a power-loom capable of weaving two-ply ingrain carpets, such as had been hitherto woven exclusively by the handloom, which only produced eight yards a day. With his first loom he succeeded in obtaining ten or twelve yards daily, which he increased by improvements until a product of twenty-five yards was regularly obtained. Afterward he invented a power loom for weaving "Brussels" (i.e. pictorial tapestry) and velvet tapestry carpets, his most important invention, which attracted much attention at the World's Fair in London in 1851. The town of Clinton, Massachusetts, owed its growth and manufacturing importance to him, as it contained the coach-lace works, the Lancaster Quilt Company, and the Bigelow Carpet Company, all of which were direct results of his inventive ability. The carpet loom made his name widely known.

Bigelow and his brother Horatio are credited with founding the town of Clinton, which was originally part of the town of Lancaster. Bigelow was elected a member of the Boston Historical Society in April 1864, and in 1869 presented to that society six large volumes entitled Inventions of Erastus Brigham Bigelow patented in England from 1837 to 1868 in which were gathered the printed specifications of eighteen patents granted to him in England. He was elected a Fellow of the American Academy of Arts and Sciences in 1866.

In 1862 Bigelow formulated a scheme of uniform taxation for the United States by means of stamps, and he published The Tariff Question, considered in regard to the Policy of England and the Interests of the United States (Boston, 1863).

== Legacy and descendants ==
Bigelow founded the Bigelow Mechanics Institute in 1846, which is today known as the Bigelow Free Public Library located in Clinton, Massachusetts. He was also an original incorporator of the Massachusetts Institute of Technology, founded in 1861.

Bigelow's only child, Helen Bigelow Merriman, became an artist and art collector and one of the founders of the Worcester Art Museum, and his grandson Roger Merriman became a noted historian.
