= Alice Cordelia Morse =

American designer of book covers (1863–1961)

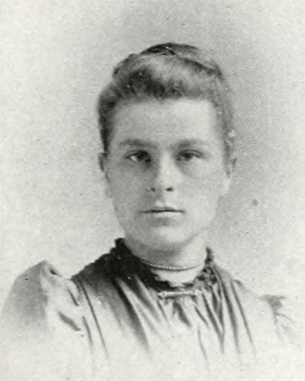
- Born: June 1, 1863; Hammondsville, Ohio, U.S.
- Died: July 15, 1961 (aged 98); The Bronx, New York, U.S.
- Education: Art and design
- Alma mater: Cooper Union; Pratt Institute
- Occupation(s): Book cover designer Teacher

Alice Cordelia Morse (June 1, 1863 – July 15, 1961) was an American designer of book covers in the late 19th and early 20th centuries. Her work was inspired by the Arts and Crafts Movement, and she is often placed as one of the top three book designers of her day.

== Early life and education ==
Morse was born in Hammondsville, Ohio, to Joseph and Ruth Perkins Morse. She had a brother, Joseph Jr., and a sister, Mary. When she was two, the family moved to Williamsburg, Brooklyn. Her early drawings failed to reveal any special talent.

Morse attended the Woman's School of Art at Cooper Union from 1879 to 1883, graduating with a degree in art and design. Cooper Union was one of the few arts schools open to women in the late 1800s. Although some students paid tuition, Cooper Union would often waive fees for students who were unable to pay; it is likely that Morse was one of these students.

After leaving Cooper Union, Morse studied at various art schools, including Alfred State College in New York.

== Art career ==
Morse began her career by working with two well-known stained glass artists of the day, first John La Farge and then Louis Comfort Tiffany. A window in Beecher Memorial Church in Brooklyn is her work. Although she learned a great deal from both, she was not terribly interested in stained glass. After she won several book cover design competitions, she decided to pursue book design instead.

In 1889, Morse left Tiffany's studio to enter a graduate program at Cooper Union directed by Susan N. Carter. During her final year of graduate school in 1892, she won a silver medal for one her life drawings.

From 1893 to 1895, Morse was employed as a designer at the New York Society of Decorative Art.

=== Book covers ===
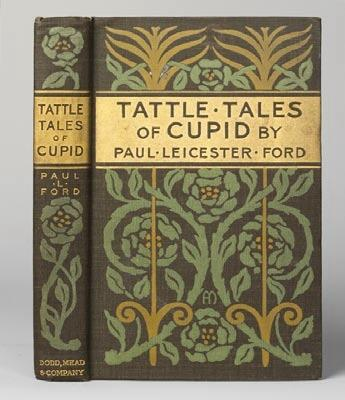
Cover design by Alice Cordelia Morse, 1898.

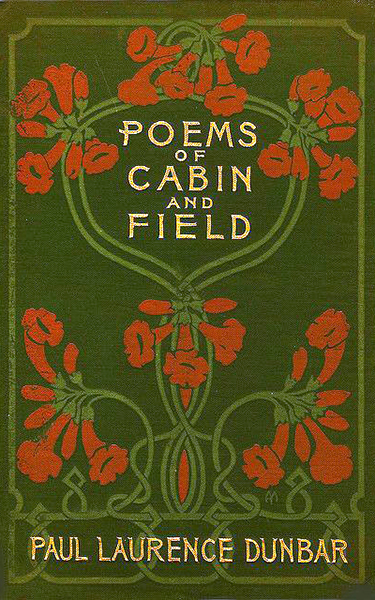
Cover design by Alice Cordelia Morse, 1900.

While still in graduate school, Morse began designing book covers.

In the period from 1887 to 1905, Morse designed approximately eighty-one book covers, many of which were for major New York publishers such as Houghton Mifflin, Charles Scribner's Sons, Harper & Brothers, G.P. Putnam's Sons, and Dodd, Mead & Company. She designed covers for various types of books, including novels, plays, poetry, art history, travel literature, children's stories, and domestic handbooks and instructional manuals. Some of these were for famous authors, including Amelia Barr, Lafcadio Hearn, William Dean Howells, Thomas Nelson Page, and Oscar Wilde. She was often asked to design special holiday editions as well as posters. She also received commissions for in-text illustrations and for adding decorative borders, vignettes, and title pages to publications. Along with designing book covers, Morse tried recreating 16th century book bindings.

True to the Arts and Crafts aesthetic, Morse's cover designs feature highly stylized patterns of organic forms like leaves and flowers. Her early work was inspired by Roman and Renaissance art, and she later experimented with designs drawn from Celtic, Arabic, Gothic, and Rococo art, and especially Art Nouveau.

Morse held that book designer must be able to take the central idea of the book and depict it creatively on its cover. She also held that women were the best designers because their "intuitive sense of decoration, their feeling for beauty of line and harmony of color insures a high degree of success".

In her own day, the high quality of her work was often referred to in book reviews and other articles, and her success in working for top publishers testifies to the regard in which her work was held. She is today considered one of the top three book designers of the era, along with Margaret Neilson Armstrong and Sarah W. Whitman, and some place her as the best in this group.

=== Exhibitions ===
Morse often exhibited her work in shows of applied arts and book arts in venues like the New York Architectural League. In 1893, she took part in planning and exhibits for the Woman's Building of the 1893 World's Columbian Exposition. Morse served as chair of the subcommittee on Book-Covers, Wood-Engraving, and Illustration of the New York State Board of Women Managers. The main goal of this project was to create exhibitions illustrating women's contributions to art, industry, sciences, social reforms, and philanthropic work. Morse also created an exhibition for the exposition that displayed eleven of her own book-cover designs. She placed well in the exhibition, receiving both a gold medal and a diploma for her designs.

Morse wrote a chapter for the Woman's Building Handbook titled "Women Illustrators" that included photographs of her designs for books including The Chevalier of Pensieri-Vani (92-1); The Chatelaine of La Trinite (92-2); Old Ways and New (94-2); The Alhambra (92-8); Scenes from the Life of Christ (92-7); and The Conquest Granada (93-3). She also created the cover for the Distaff Series, which was a set of six books written, designed, and typeset by women, published by Harper & Brothers, and sold in the Woman's Building.

== Teaching career ==
The market for artists skilled in designing covers for cloth-bound books dropped off in the early 1900s with the invention of paper book jackets. As a result, Morse decided to shift into teaching. In 1896 she entered Pratt Institute in New York City, graduating in 1897 with a two-year degree in teaching. She moved to Scranton, Pennsylvania, to accept a position in the city's public school system. At this time Scranton was a wealthy city and Morse made a better living as a teacher than she ever did as a designer.

For her first position, Morse was appointed supervisor of the art and drawing programs for local elementary schools. After two years, she accepted the position of supervisor for the art and drawing programs for the high schools. She worked out of Scranton Central High School, which was considered to be the best school in the area and served as a college preparatory school for both girls and boys. Morse was offered her final position in 1917 as district director of all art and drawing programs in both elementary and high schools across the area. She remained in this position until her retirement in 1924 after a quarter century in the Scranton school system.

== Later years and legacy ==
After her retirement, Morse returned to New York City and moved in with her widowed sister. Not much is known of her life in the succeeding decades. She died in 1961 in the Bronx's St. Barnabus Hospital. She donated 58 of her book covers to the Metropolitan Museum of Art Library where they were exhibited for a short while. They then were preserved in the library's print holdings and remained inaccessible until 1997.
