= Merryman =

Merryman is a surname. Notable people with the surname include:

- Deanna Merryman (born 1972), American actress and model
- George H. Merryman (1878–1948), American physician and politician
- Jerry Merryman (1932–2019), inventor of the handheld calculator
- John Merryman (1824–1881), the petitioner in one of the best known habeas corpus cases of the American Civil War
- Marjorie Merryman (born 1951), American composer, author, and music educator
- Merryman, a DC Comics character and leader of the Inferior Five

== See also ==
- Merriman (disambiguation)
- Ex parte Merryman, 17 F. Cas. 144 (1861), well-known U.S. federal court case which arose out of the American Civil War
