= IOOF Building (Worcester, Massachusetts) =

- U.S. National Register of Historic Places
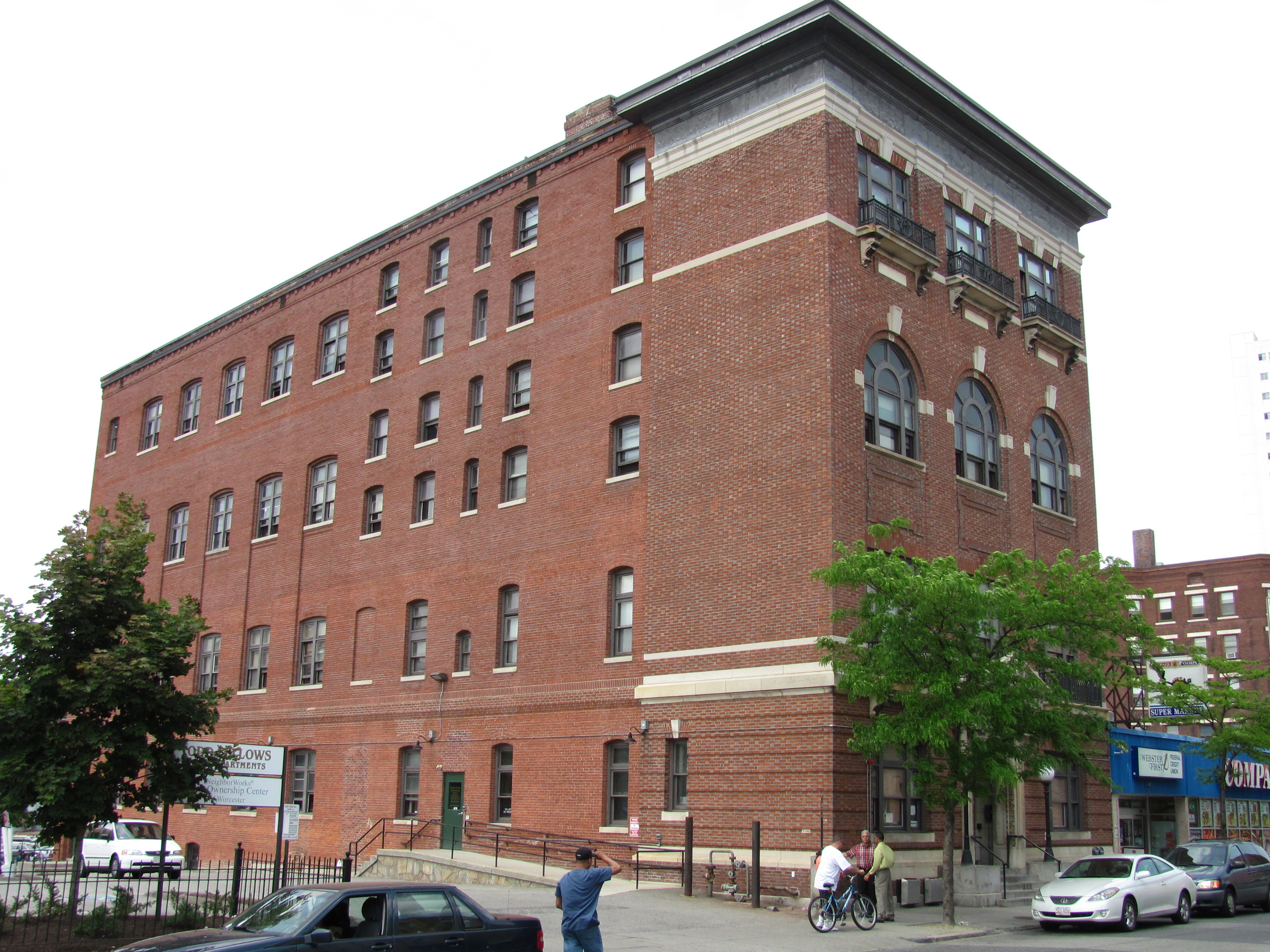
- IOOF Building

- Location within Massachusetts Location within the United States
- Location: 674 Main St., Worcester, Massachusetts
- Coordinates: 42°15′31″N 71°48′26″W
- Built: 1906
- Architect: Fisher, Clellan W.
- Architectural style: Beaux Arts
- MPS: Worcester MRA
- NRHP reference No.: 80000535
- Added to NRHP: March 5, 1980

The IOOF Building is a historic building at 674 Main Street in Worcester, Massachusetts.

== History ==
The four-story brick Beaux Arts style building was designed by Clellan W. Fisher and was constructed in 1906 for the local chapter of the International Order of Odd Fellows.

The building was added to the National Register of Historic Places in 1980.

== Construction ==
The building is primarily brick, laid in Flemish bond, with dressed limestone trim. Prominent on the front facade is the main entry, an elaborate limestone archway which occupies the center of three bays. On the second floor, the side bays are highlighted by balconies that retain their original wrought iron railings. The third floor windows are large with rounded arch tops, while all three of the fourth floor windows have limestone balconies with wrought iron rails.

== See also ==
- Odd Fellows' Home (Worcester, Massachusetts)
- National Register of Historic Places listings in southwestern Worcester, Massachusetts
- National Register of Historic Places listings in Worcester County, Massachusetts
