= Daniel Merriman =

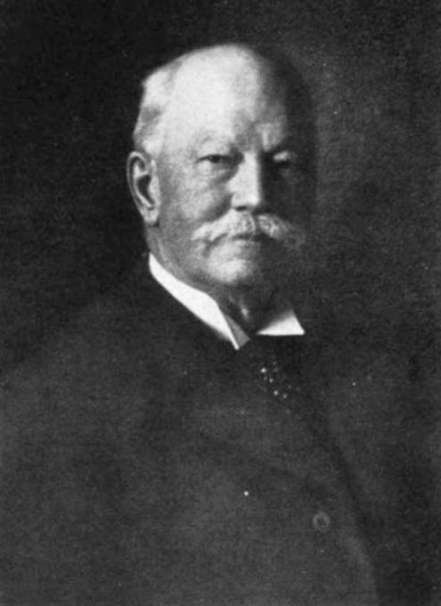
- Born: December 3, 1838; Bennington, Vermont, US
- Died: September 18, 1912 (aged 73); Intervale, New Hampshire, US
- Education: Williams College; Andover Theological Seminary
- Occupation: Clergyman
- Spouse: Helen Bigelow Merriman (m. 1874)
- Children: Roger Bigelow Merriman

Daniel Merriman (December 3, 1838 – September 18, 1912) was an American Congregational minister and art collector. With his wife, Helen Bigelow Merriman, he was a cofounder of the Worcester Art Museum and served as its first president.

== Biography ==
Daniel Merriman was born in Bennington, Vermont, to Addison Merriman and Prudence (Adams) Merriman. He was educated at Williams College, from which he graduated in 1863. During the Civil War, he served as a first lieutenant and as an adjutant to an Illinois regiment. At war's end, he entered Andover Theological Seminary, graduating with a Doctor of Divinity degree in 1868.

Merriman's first ministry was in Norwich, Connecticut, at the Broadway Congregational Church. In 1874, he married the artist and philanthropist Helen Bigelow Merriman, and they had a son, Roger Bigelow Merriman, who became a historian. They settled in Worcester, Massachusetts, in 1878, where he served for 22 years as minister at the Central Congregational Church. Merriman and his wife led the drive to construct a new building for the Congregational Church at the corner of Grove St. and Institute Rd. Designed by architect Stephen C. Earle in the Romanesque Revival style, it was completed in 1885; today the building is known as the United Congregational Church.

Merriman was one of the original founders and trustees of the Worcester Art Museum, and he drafted the museum's bylaws. When it opened in 1898, he served as its first president, and he sat on various administrative committees. When he died, the trustees wrote that next to Stephen Salisbury III, "the Worcester Art Museum owes most to Daniel Merriman, under whose administration it has won position, prestige, and the confidence of the public".

In 1910, Joseph DeCamp painted a portrait of Merriman that was later donated to the museum. Merriman served as a trustee for the Worcester Polytechnic Institute, Williams College, and Atlanta University. He died of heart disease in Intervale, New Hampshire in 1912, aged 73.
