= Helen Bigelow Merriman =

American painter

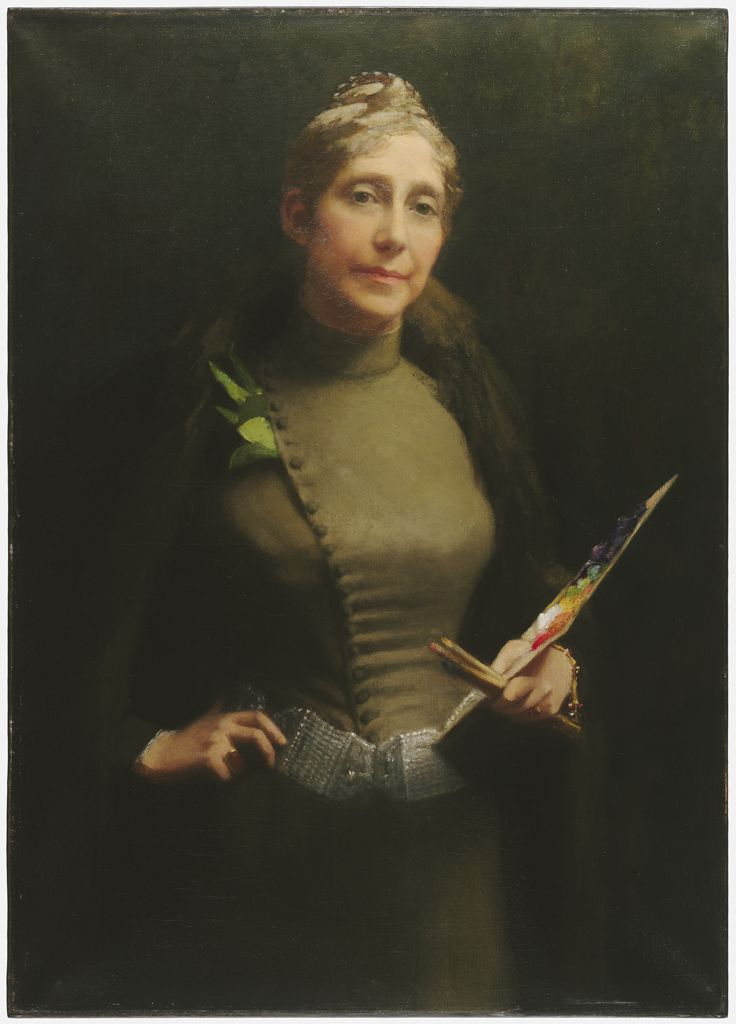
Sarah Wyman Whitman painted by Helen Bigelow Merriman, oil on canvas, 1909-10

Helen Bigelow Merriman (July 14, 1844–1933) was a painter and art collector, and one of the founders of the Worcester Art Museum, to which she also donated a number of paintings by European and American artists. She wrote a number of books about art and spirituality.

== Family and education ==
Helen Bigelow was the only child of Erastus Brigham Bigelow, an inventor of weaving machinery and founder of the Bigelow Carpet Company. She grew up on a large estate and working farm in North Conway, New Hampshire. Later in life, she used Stonehurst Manor, the family house on this property, as a summer residence; it is now a hotel. She also helped found The Memorial Hospital in North Conway by providing the land and funds necessary to establish the facility.

In 1874, she married the Rev. Daniel Merriman, and they had a son, Roger Bigelow Merriman, who became a historian.

== Worcester Museum ==
Merriman and her husband settled in Worcester, Massachusetts, in 1878, where he served as minister at the Central Congregational Church. She was active in the newly formed Worcester Art Society, giving lectures and contributing works for exhibition from her personal collection of European and American art. She was also involved with the Worcester Art Students Club, which exhibited some of her own paintings.

Merriman and her husband were among the founders of the Worcester Art Museum, giving a large donation and serving as trustees and members of the board. Merriman also served on several committees related to the museum's educational mission and helped bring the Boston Impressionist painter Philip Leslie Hale out to the museum to oversee its studio art courses. She led the museum's early efforts to build its collection and lent or donated a number of works including pieces by Pierre Subleyras, Paulus Moreelse, Edmund Tarbell, and Arthur B. Davies. Merriman was a champion of women artists, and it was through her that the museum acquired or exhibited works by Sarah Wyman Whitman and Cecilia Beaux.

Merriman stepped down from her positions at the museum in 1922–23. By the time of her death a decade later, the Worcester Art Museum had evolved into a respected museum, in no small part due to Merriman's early efforts on its behalf.

== Publications ==
Merriman wrote several books about art and spirituality, including What Shall Make Us Whole?: Or, Thoughts in the Direction of Man's Spiritual and Physical Integrity (1888), The Perfect Lord (1891), Concerning Portraits and Portraiture (1891), and Religio Pictoris (1899). Religio Pictoris explores the relationship between art and religion and attempts to demonstrate a fundamental unity between the material and spiritual dimensions of life. Among the subjects discussed in Concerning Portraits and Portraiture is the working process of artist Abbott Thayer, who had painted a portrait of Merriman the year before.

== Paintings ==
Merriman's portrait of her friend Sarah Wyman Whitman is now in the Schlesinger Library at the Radcliffe Institute for Advanced Study.

== Other philanthropy ==
Merriman donated land and money to found Memorial Hospital in North Conway, New Hampshire, in 1911. She also served as president of the North Conway Public Library.
