= Percy Merriman =

English musician and songwriter (1882–1966)

- Born: 11 June 1882
- Died: 1966 (aged 83–84)
- Occupations: Musician, songwriter
- Notable work: Old Comrades Re-Union
- Children: Eric Merriman

Percival Harry Merriman (11 June 1882 – 1966) was an English musician and songwriter.

During World War I, he served in the 60th Division, Civil Service Rifles. While convalescing, in 1917, he became a member of The Roosters Concert Party, named after Captain G U B Roose, the Commandant of their base in Salonika, Summerhill Camp. They turned professional, made their first radio broadcast in 1923, and operated for another two decades. For them, he wrote sketches and songs, the latter including "Old Comrades Re-Union" (1930).

He appeared as a castaway on the BBC Radio programme Desert Island Discs on 17 August 1964.

His son Eric Merriman was a comedy scriptwriter, writing Beyond Our Ken for Kenneth Horne and Kenneth Williams.
