= Eric Merriman =

- Born: Eric Hugh Peter Merriman; 6 December 1924; Golders Green, London, England
- Died: 2 June 2003 (aged 78); London, England
- Occupations: Radio and television comedy scriptwriter

Eric Hugh Peter Merriman (6 December 1924 – 2 June 2003) was a British radio and television writer, who provided material for numerous comedians including Frankie Howerd, Terry Scott and Morecambe and Wise.

== Life and career ==
Born in Golders Green, the son of musician Percy Merriman, he attended Finchley Catholic High School, where he started writing for Boy Scout magazines and children's annuals. When he left school his first job was as a subeditor on a scout magazine – and he created sketches for the Boy Scout Gang Show. By the early 1940s, he was a caption writer for the Picture Post.

In 1943 he joined the Royal Air Force, trained as an air gunner/navigator and sang and played drums in his station dance band. After demobilisation, he sold advertising space with the Financial Times, and started submitting jokes and sketches for radio programmes, including Henry Hall's Guest Night, where he came to the attention of Kenneth Horne. By 1956, Merriman wrote for the sitcom Great Scott, It's Maynard, starring Terry Scott and Bill Maynard, and also wrote sketches for Jack Hulbert and Cicely Courtneidge.

From 1958, he wrote, at first with Barry Took and then solo between 1960 and 1965, the radio series Beyond Our Ken, starring Kenneth Horne and also featuring Kenneth Williams, Hugh Paddick, Bill Pertwee and others. In 1965 Merriman left the radio series to work in television, and its successor Round the Horne was written by Took with Marty Feldman.

In television, Merriman wrote the series Call It What You Like in 1965, and was also a writer for several Terry Scott vehicles, Scott on... and Happy Ever After. He also wrote for Norman Vaughan, Dave Allen, Stanley Baxter, Frankie Howerd, Russ Abbot, Dick Emery, and Mike Yarwood, among others. He featured on radio and television panel shows such as Call My Bluff, and wrote and produced television specials for Bruce Forsyth and others.

With his son Andy, he co-wrote the radio sitcom series Minor Adjustment (broadcast on BBC Radio 4 in 1996), based on Andy's bringing up of his then four-year-old daughter, Sarah (who appeared in the series), with Down syndrome.

Merriman died in London in June 2003, aged 78. He was cremated on 10 June 2003 at Golders Green Crematorium. His ashes lie in section 3-M of the Garden of Remembrance. There is no memorial.
