= John Merriman =

John Merriman may refer to:

- John Merriman (actor), American actor and filmmaker
- John Merriman (athlete) (1936–1999), British Olympic athlete
- John Merriman (bishop) (died 1572), Bishop of Down and Connor from 1568 to 1572
- John M. Merriman (1946–2022), Yale professor of French and European history
- John G. Merriman (1929–1964), Central Intelligence Agency pilot
- John X. Merriman (1841–1926), last prime minister of the Cape Colony before the formation of the Union of South Africa in 1910
- Johnny Merriman (1899–1986), American football, basketball, and baseball coach

== See also ==
- John Merriman Reynolds (1848–1933), U.S. Representative from the state of Pennsylvania
