= R. B. Merriman =

American historian

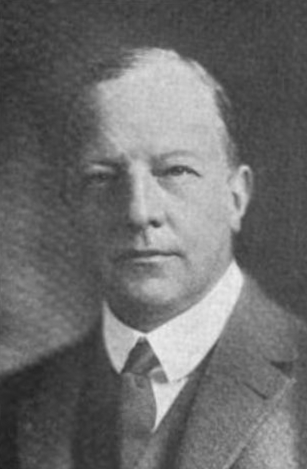
- Born: Roger Bigelow Merriman; May 24, 1876; Boston, Massachusetts, United States
- Died: September 7, 1945 (aged 69); Saint Andrews, New Brunswick, Canada
- Education: Harvard University; Oxford University
- Occupation: Historian
- Spouse: Dorothea Foote (m. 1904)
- Children: 4

Roger Bigelow Merriman (May 24, 1876 – September 7, 1945) was an American historian and a practitioner of scientific historiography developed by German historians. He is known especially for his multivolume history of the Spanish Empire.

== Biography ==
R. B. Merriman was born in Boston on May 24, 1876, the only child of Daniel Merriman, minister of the Central Congregational Church in Worcester, Massachusetts, and the artist and art collector Helen Bigelow Merriman. His maternal grandfather was Erastus Brigham Bigelow, an inventor of weaving machinery.

Merriman entered Harvard University as an undergraduate in 1892, earning both an A.B. and an M.A. degree. He went on to spend two years (1897–99) studying history at Oxford University, finishing with a B.Litt. degree. He obtained his Ph.D. from Harvard in 1902 and that same year published his biography of Thomas Cromwell, which he considered "as apprentice work." In 1902 Merriman was elected a member of the American Antiquarian Society.

Merriman taught at Harvard for many years. He was initially hired in 1902 as an instructor and was later promoted to assistant professor (1908) and full professor (1918). He served for a time as master of Eliot House. In 1925–36, he was a visiting professor at the Sorbonne in France. He received a number of honorary doctorates.

The course he taught on the Spanish Empire gave the impetus for his research and voluminous publication on the topic. His four-volume work The Rise of the Spanish Empire in the Old World and the New (1918–1934) is recognized as a pioneering work in the field of Latin American history. Its main thesis is that "the Spanish Empire, unlike its British rival, was the natural continuation of Spain's medieval history." One assessment of his work is that "Merriman will always be a historian's historian," and his work never found public favor. "In the long run, one feels, the reputation of Roger Merriman is secure in the hands of his fellow historians."

== Works ==
- The Life and Letters of Thomas Cromwell (London, 1902)
- The Rise of the Spanish Empire in the Old World and the New (4 vols., 1918–34)
  - Vol. I, The Middle Ages (New York: The Macmillan Company, 1918)
  - Vol. II, The Catholic Kings (New York: The Macmillan Company, 1918)
  - Vol. III, The Emperor (New York: The Macmillan Company, 1925)
  - Vol. IV, Philip the Prudent (New York: The Macmillan Company, 1934)
- Suleiman the Magnificent 1520-1566 (Cambridge, Mass., 1944)

== Personal life ==
Merriman married Dorothea Foote on June 2, 1904, and they had four children: Roger, Daniel, Dorothea, and Helen.

He died at Saint Andrews, New Brunswick on September 7, 1945.
