= Frederick Merriman =

Frederick Merriman may refer to:

- Frederick Merriman (politician) (1818–1865), New Zealand politician
- Frederick Merriman (athlete), tug of war Olympian
