= 1965 United Kingdom local elections =

Elections in the United Kingdom

The 1965 United Kingdom local elections took place in 1965.

== County councils ==
- Essex
- Kent
- Surrey

== County Boroughs ==
- Leeds
- Liverpool
- Sheffield

== Scottish City Corporations ==
- Aberdeen
- Dundee
- Edinburgh
- Glasgow

== Urban district councils ==
Elected in thirds:

- Hale

== Municipal boroughs ==
- Altrincham
- Sale

== See also ==
- 1965 in the United Kingdom
