= 1965 in British radio =

This is a list of events from British radio in 1965.

== Events ==
=== January ===
- 27 January – Paul Simon broadcasts on BBC radio for the first time, on the Five to Ten show, discussing and playing thirteen songs, most of which will appear on The Paul Simon Song Book.

=== February ===
- No events

=== March ===
- 7 March – Debut of the BBC Radio comedy sketch show Round the Horne hosted by Kenneth Horne. The fourth programme (28 March) introduces the camp pair Julian and Sandy (played by Hugh Paddick and Kenneth Williams), who will go on to introduce the gay and theatrical cant Polari to a regular audience which builds to 15 million.
- 23 March – The BBC Music Programme begins broadcasting classical musical during the daytime on the BBC Third Programme frequency.

=== April ===
- No events

=== May ===
- 1 May – The General Overseas Service is renamed to the BBC World Service.
- 10 May – The name of the morning religious programme on the BBC Home Service is changed from Lift Up Your Hearts to Ten To Eight.
- 24 May – The BBC Home Service broadcasts a translation of Anton Chekhov's 1900 play Three Sisters starring Jill Bennett, Lynn Redgrave, Paul Scofield and Ian McKellen, directed by John Tydeman.

=== June ===
- No events

=== July ===
- No events

=== August ===
- No events

=== September ===
- No events

=== October ===
- 4 October
  - Debut of The World at One, the BBC radio lunchtime news and current affairs programme which will still be running as of 2020.
  - The BBC announces plans to introduce a new service for Asian immigrants starting the following week.
- 10 October – The Hindustani language service, broadcast on the BBC Home Service on Sunday mornings, launches with a programme called Apna Hi Ghar Samajhiye (Make Yourself at Home).

=== November ===
- No events

=== December ===
- 31 December – Offshore "pirate" radio station Radio Scotland begins broadcasting, from LV Comet anchored outside U.K. territorial waters off Dunbar (not to be confused with BBC Radio Scotland).

== Station debuts ==
- 31 December – Radio Scotland (1965–1967)

== Programme debuts ==
- 6 January – Petticoat Line on the BBC Home Service (1965–1979)
- 7 March – Round the Horne on the BBC Light Programme (1965–1968)
- 4 October – The World at One on the BBC Home Service (1965–Present)

== Continuing radio programmes ==
=== 1940s ===
- Music While You Work (1940–1967)
- Sunday Half Hour (1940–2018)
- Desert Island Discs (1942–Present)
- Family Favourites (1945–1980)
- Down Your Way (1946–1992)
- Have A Go (1946–1967)
- Housewives' Choice (1946–1967)
- Letter from America (1946–2004)
- Woman's Hour (1946–Present)
- Twenty Questions (1947–1976)
- Any Questions? (1948–Present)
- The Dales (1948–1969)
- Billy Cotton Band Show (1949–1968)
- A Book at Bedtime (1949–Present)

=== 1950s ===
- The Archers (1950–Present)
- Listen with Mother (1950–1982)
- From Our Own Correspondent (1955–Present)
- Pick of the Pops (1955–Present)
- The Clitheroe Kid (1957–1972)
- My Word! (1957–1988)
- Test Match Special (1957–Present)
- The Today Programme (1957–Present)
- The Navy Lark (1959–1977)
- Sing Something Simple (1959–2001)
- Your Hundred Best Tunes (1959–2007)

=== 1960s ===
- Farming Today (1960–Present)
- Easy Beat (1960–1967)
- In Touch (1961–Present)
- The Men from the Ministry (1962–1977)
- I'm Sorry, I'll Read That Again (1964–1973)

== Births ==
- 4 March – Andrew Collins, DJ and broadcast journalist
- 17 April – Rosie Millard, arts journalist and broadcaster
- 3 May – Rob Brydon, Welsh media presenter and performer
- 17 May – Jeremy Vine, author, journalist and news presenter
- 31 May – Lisa I'Anson, broadcaster
- 4 July – Jo Whiley, DJ
- 16 October – Steve Lamacq, DJ
- 26 October – Sakari Oramo, Finnish orchestral conductor
- 12 November – Eddie Mair, broadcast journalist and presenter
- Gareth Edwards, broadcast comedy producer
- Caz Graham, agricultural broadcaster
- Anne-Marie Minhall, radio presenter
- Jon Naismith, radio comedy producer

== Deaths ==
- 22 December – Richard Dimbleby, broadcast journalist and presenter (born 1913)

== See also ==
- 1965 in British music
- 1965 in British television
- 1965 in the United Kingdom
- List of British films of 1965
