= 1965 in the United Kingdom =

Events from the year 1965 in the United Kingdom.

== Incumbents ==
- Monarch – Elizabeth II
- Prime Minister – Harold Wilson (Labour)

== Events ==
- 1 January – Introduction of the new "Worboys Committee" road signs.
- 7 January – Identical twin brothers Ronnie and Reggie Kray, 31, are arrested on suspicion of running a protection racket in London, although acquitted on 6 April.
- 14 January – The Prime Ministers of Northern Ireland and the Republic of Ireland meet for the first time in 43 years.
- 15 January – Sir Winston Churchill is reported to be seriously ill after suffering a stroke.
- 24 January – Sir Winston Churchill dies aged 90 at his home, 28 Hyde Park Gate in London.
- 30 January – Thousands attend Winston Churchill's state funeral in London. During the three days of lying-in-state, 321,000 people have filed past the catafalque in Westminster Hall and the funeral procession travels from here to the service at St Paul's Cathedral, attended by Queen Elizabeth II, Prime Minister Harold Wilson and representatives of 112 countries. He is buried privately at Bladon near his family's ancestral home in Oxfordshire.
- 31 January – National Health Service prescription charges end.
- 1 February – The Queen and the Duke of Edinburgh arrive in Ethiopia on a state visit.
- 4 February – Confederation of British Industry founded.
- 6 February – Stanley Matthews plays his final First Division game, at the record age of 50 years and 5 days. He became the first footballer to be awarded a knighthood in the New Year's honours list.
- 12 February – Civil rights leader Malcolm X visits Smethwick in Birmingham, UK, following the racially charged 1964 general election campaign here.
- 16 February – The British Railways Board (chairman: Richard Beeching) publishes The Development of the Major Trunk Routes proposing which lines should receive investment (and, by implication, which should not).
- 18 February – The Gambia becomes independent from the United Kingdom.
- 3 March – The remains of Roger Casement, from Pentonville Prison, are reburied in Dublin.
- 7 March – Debut of the BBC Radio comedy series Round the Horne, hosted by Kenneth Horne. The fourth programme (28 March) introduces the camp pair Julian and Sandy (played by Hugh Paddick and Kenneth Williams) who will go on to introduce the gay and theatrical cant Polari to a regular audience which builds to 15 million.
- 11 March – Goldie, a London Zoo golden eagle, is recaptured after thirteen days of freedom.
- 19 March – A record price of 760,000 guineas is paid at Christie's London auction house for Rembrandt's painting Titus.
- 23 March – Dr. Dorothy Hodgkin is appointed a member of the Order of Merit.
- 27 March – PizzaExpress opens its first restaurant in London.
- 28 March – The Queen's aunt, Mary, Princess Royal and Countess of Harewood, dies of a heart attack at Harewood House aged 67. The United Kingdom will not have another Princess Royal until 1987.
- 1 April
  - The Greater London Council comes into its powers, replacing the London County Council and greatly expanding the metropolitan area of the city.
  - Finance Act introduces corporation tax, replacing income tax for corporate institutions.
- 6 April – The Government publicly announces cancellation of the BAC TSR-2 nuclear bomber aircraft project. The prototype broke the sound barrier on 22 February.
- 14 April – British United Airways Flight 1030X crashes on the island of Jersey; 23 people are killed, including all the passengers, and only one crew member survives.
- 23 April – The Pennine Way long-distance footpath officially opens.
- 26 April – Manchester United win the Football League First Division title.
- 1 May – Liverpool win the FA Cup for the first time in their history, beating Leeds United 2–1 at Wembley Stadium. Roger Hunt and Ian St John score for Liverpool, while Billy Bremner scores the consolation goal for Leeds.
- 3 May – Asda is formed and opens its first supermarket in Castleford, Yorkshire.
- 7 May – The Rhodesian Front under Prime Minister Ian Smith wins a landslide election victory in Rhodesia from the white minority electorate.
- 11 May – The National Trust officially launches its long-term Enterprise Neptune project to acquire or put under covenant a substantial part of the Welsh, English and Northern Irish coastline. Whiteford Burrows on the Gower Peninsula is considered the first property to be acquired under the campaign although its purchase was announced on 1 January.
- 13 May – The Conservatives make big gains at the UK local government elections.
- 17 May – An underground explosion at Cambrian Colliery in Clydach Vale kills 31.
- 18 May – The Queen and the Duke of Edinburgh begin a 10-day state visit to the Federal German Republic.
- 19 May – West Ham become the second British club to win a European trophy, defeating West German team 1860 Munich 2–0 at Wembley Stadium.
- May – The first UK branch of the KFC fast food restaurant chain opens in Preston, Lancashire.
- 3 June – The bank rate is reduced to 6 per cent.
- 14 June – Paul McCartney of The Beatles records the song "Yesterday" at Abbey Road Studios in London.
- 17 June – London premiere of Frank Marcus' farce The Killing of Sister George (at the Duke of York's Theatre), one of the first mainstream British plays with lesbian characters. Beryl Reid plays the title role. The play previewed in April at the Bristol Old Vic.
- 18 June – The government announces plans for the introduction of a blood alcohol limit for drivers in its clampdown on drink driving.
- 22 June – The 700th anniversary of Parliament is celebrated.
- 26 June – Fictional characters Ian Chesterton and Barbara Wright return to contemporary Earth after travelling with The Doctor (Doctor Who).
- June – The Certificate of Secondary Education (CSE) is first examined as a school-leaving qualification in England, Wales and Northern Ireland.
- 6 July – 1965 Little Baldon Hastings accident: A Royal Air Force Handley Page Hastings crashes at Little Baldon, Oxfordshire, just after takeoff from RAF Abingdon on a parachute training exercise, killing all 41 men on board.
- 8 July – Great Train Robber Ronnie Biggs escapes from Wandsworth Prison.
- 12 July – The Secretary of State for Education and Science, Tony Crosland, issues Circular 10/65 requesting local authorities to convert their schools to the Comprehensive system.
- 22 July – Sir Alec Douglas-Home suddenly resigns as Leader of the Conservative Party.
- 24 July – Freddie Mills, former British boxing champion, is found shot in his car in Soho, dying the next day.
- 26 July – The Maldives become independent from the United Kingdom
- 27 July – Edward Heath becomes Leader of the Conservative Party following its first leadership election by secret ballot.
- 29 July – The Beatles film Help! makes its debut in London.
- 1 August
  - Cigarette advertising is banned from British television.
  - Radio and television licence fees are increased.
- 3 August – "The Queen's Award to Industry" for export and technological advancements is created.
- 5 August – The Redundancy Payments Act gives statutory rights to redundancy payments.
- 6 August
  - Elizabeth Lane appointed as the first female High Court judge, assigned to the Family Division.
  - Peter Watkins' The War Game, a television docudrama depicting the aftermath of a nuclear attack on the UK, is pulled from its planned transmission as BBC1's The Wednesday Play for political reasons. It will go on to win the 1966 Academy Award for Best Documentary Feature. It will eventually be broadcast twenty years later.
- 20 August – The Rolling Stones' "(I Can't Get No) Satisfaction" is released in the UK.
- 21 August – Charlton Athletic F.C. player Keith Peacock becomes the first substitute to appear in a Football League match (for an injured player).
- 2 September – Sir Harry Hylton-Foster, Speaker of the House of Commons, dies in office.
- 16 September – UK release of the film Darling starring Julie Christie.
- 21 September – BP's oil platform Sea Gem strikes natural gas in the North Sea oil field.
- 24 September – The British governor of Aden cancels the Aden constitution and takes direct control of the protectorate, due to the bad security situation.
- 30 September – The first episode of ATV 'Supermarionation' series Thunderbirds airs.
- 7 October – Ian Brady, a 27-year-old stock clerk from Hyde in Cheshire, is charged with the murder of 17-year-old apprentice electrician Edward Evans at a house on the Hattersley overspill housing estate last night.
- 8 October – The Post Office Tower opens in London.
- 15 October – 150 police officers are drafted in to search Saddleworth Moor for the bodies of up to 11 missing people, mostly children or teenagers, who are believed to be buried there. The suspect in the murders is Ian Brady, charged with the murder of 17-year-old Edward Evans eight days ago. His 23-year-old girlfriend Myra Hindley has also since been charged with the murder, having been arrested on 11 October.
- 16 October – Police find a girl's body on Saddleworth Moor, identified the following day as that of 10-year-old Lesley Ann Downey, who disappeared on Boxing Day last year from a fairground in the Ancoats area of Manchester.
- 18 October – The Magic Roundabout makes its debut on BBC One at 5:50pm.
- 20 October – It is reported in the regional and national media that suspected mass murderer Ian Brady tortured his victims and tape-recorded the attacks on them. Detectives in Brady's native Scotland are also reportedly investigating the disappearance of 12-year-old Moira Anderson in Lanarkshire eight years ago as a possible link to Brady.
- 21 October – Ian Brady and Myra Hindley are charged with the murder of Lesley Ann Downey and remanded in custody.
- 22 October – African countries demand that the United Kingdom use force to prevent Rhodesia from declaring unilateral independence.
- 24 October
  - Prime Minister Harold Wilson and Arthur Bottomley travel to Rhodesia for negotiations.
  - Police find the decomposed body of a boy buried on Saddleworth Moor. The body is identified as that of 12-year-old John Kilbride, who disappeared from Ashton-under-Lyne in November 1963.
- 26 October – Horace King is appointed as the new Speaker of the House of Commons, the first member of the Labour Party to hold that position.
- 27 October – British European Airways Vickers Vanguard crash: a Vickers Vanguard of BEA crashes while landing at Heathrow Airport, and all 36 people on board are killed.
- 29 October – Moors murders: Ian Brady and Myra Hindley appear in court, charged with the murders of Edward Evans (17), Lesley Ann Downey (10), and John Kilbride (12) from Manchester.
- 31 October – The police search of Saddleworth Moor concludes after 16 days, although media reports suggest that police suspect that bodies may be buried there. Ian Brady and Myra Hindley are expected to be tried for three murders next Spring.
- October – Corgi Toys introduce the all time best-selling model car, James Bond's Aston Martin DB5 from the film Goldfinger.
- 1 November – The uncompleted Ferrybridge C electricity generating station cooling towers in West Yorkshire collapse in high winds.
- 5 November – Martial law is announced in Rhodesia. The UN General Assembly accepts British intent to use force against Rhodesia if necessary by a vote of 82–9.
- 8 November
  - The Murder (Abolition of Death Penalty) Act suspends capital punishment for murder in England, Scotland and Wales, for five years in the first instance, replacing it with a mandatory sentence of life imprisonment. Anyone sentenced to life imprisonment is liable to be imprisoned for the rest of his or her natural life, but can be paroled on life licence by the Home Secretary if deemed safe by the Parole Board.
  - The Race Relations Act makes it a civil offence to discriminate in serving people in "places of public resort" on the grounds of colour, race, ethnicity or nationality and creates the offence of "incitement to racial hatred" (Act does not apply in Northern Ireland).
  - A new Rent Act introduces regulated tenancies with fair rents set by independent regional assessors and protection from eviction without a court order.
  - The British Indian Ocean Territory is created, consisting of Chagos Archipelago, Aldabra, Farquhar and Des Roches islands (on 23 June 1976 Aldabra, Farquhar and Des Roches are returned to Seychelles).
- 11 November – In Rhodesia, the white minority regime of Ian Smith unilaterally declares independence.
- 13 November – The word "fuck" is spoken for the first time on British television by the theatre critic Kenneth Tynan.
- 20 November – The UN Security Council recommends that all states stop trading with Rhodesia.
- 29 November – Mary Whitehouse founds the National Viewers' and Listeners' Association.
- December
  - EMI release Jacqueline du Pré's recording of Elgar's Cello Concerto with John Barbirolli and the London Symphony Orchestra.
  - National Coal Board closes the last deep coal mine in the Forest of Dean (Northern United at Cinderford).
- 3 December
  - The first British aid flight arrives in Lusaka; Zambia has asked for British help against Rhodesia.
  - Members of the Organization of African Unity decide to sever diplomatic relations with the United Kingdom unless the British Government ends the rebellion of Rhodesia by mid-December.
- 12 December – The Beatles' final live UK tour concludes with two performances at the Capitol, Cardiff.
- 15 December – Tanzania and Guinea sever diplomatic relations with the United Kingdom.
- 17 December – The UK government begins an oil embargo against Rhodesia; the United States joins the effort.
- 20 December – West End opening of musical Twang!! A notorious flop, it closes after just 43 performances and ruins Lionel Bart, its writer.
- 22 December
  - A 70 mph speed limit is imposed on UK roads.
  - A reorganisation of the cabinet sees Roy Jenkins appointed Home Secretary and Barbara Castle as Minister of Transport.
- 24 December – A meteorite shower falls on Barwell, Leicestershire.
- 27 December – The British oil platform Sea Gem collapses in the North Sea, killing thirteen of the 32 men aboard it.
- 29 December – Thunderball, the fourth James Bond film, is released.
- 30 December – President Kenneth Kaunda of Zambia announces that Zambia and the United Kingdom have agreed to a deadline before which the Rhodesian white minority-rule government should be ousted.

=== Undated ===
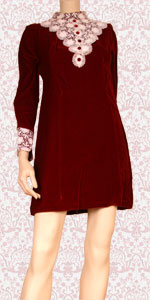
Red velvet minidress, c. 1965

- 1965 United Kingdom local elections.
- The Council for National Academic Awards begins validation of degree courses outside the university sector.
- First national Building Regulations for England and Wales are made.
- Mary Quant introduces the miniskirt from her shop Bazaar on the Kings Road in Chelsea, London.
- The Rotunda landmark office building completed in Birmingham city centre.
- The motorway network continues to expand with the Preston-Lancaster section of the M6 opening in January, the M4 being expanded from Slough to London in March, a motorway section of the A1 opening in County Durham in May, the M1 being expanded from Rugby to Kegworth (Leicestershire) in November, along with a four-mile stretch of the M5 west of Birmingham, as well as the first phase of motorway in Scotland with the M8 as well as the expansion of the M2 through Kent.
- German carmaker Audi begins importing cars to Britain, with its F103 range of family saloon cars.
- Toyota, the Japanese industrial giant, begins importing passenger cars to the United Kingdom when its Corona family saloon – similar in size to the Ford Cortina – is launched.
- The first hatchback production car, the French built Renault 16, goes on sale in Britain.

== Publications ==
- Agatha Christie's Miss Marple novel At Bertram's Hotel.
- Ian Fleming's posthumous James Bond novel The Man with the Golden Gun.
- John Fowles's novel The Magus.
- David Lodge's novel The British Museum Is Falling Down.
- W. Keble Martin's flora The Concise British Flora in Colour.

== Births ==
- 4 January
  - Beth Gibbons, trip hop singer (Portishead)
  - Cait O'Riordan, Nigeria-born British-Irish folk punk bass guitar player and songwriter
  - Julia Ormond, actress
  - Rob Wilson, politician
- 5 January – Vinnie Jones, footballer and actor
- 6 January – Laurence Hurst, biologist and academic
- 9 January – Joely Richardson, actress
- 13 January – Bill Bailey, comedian
- 14 January
  - Hugh Fearnley-Whittingstall, chef
  - Jemma Redgrave, actress
  - Slick Rick, British-American rapper
- 15 January
  - James Nesbitt, Northern Irish actor
  - Jill Saward, English rape victim and activist (died 2017)
- 16 January
  - John Carver, football player and manager
  - Rufus Norris, theatre director
- 20 January – Sophie, Duchess of Edinburgh, née Rhys-Jones
- 21 January – Robert Del Naja, artist and musician
- 25 January – Mark Jordon, actor
- 27 January – Alan Cumming, Scottish actor
- February – Alison Brittain, née Hopkins, business executive
- 2 February – Carl Airey, footballer
- 5 February – Martha Fiennes, film director
- 9 February – Keith Wickham, voice actor
- 15 February – Mickey Lewis, English footballer and manager (d. 2021)
- 21 February – David Frost, Baron Frost, diplomat and politician
- 26 February – Alison Armitage, English model and actress
- 28 February – Norman Smiley, wrestler
- 2 March – Martin Gilks, musician and band manager (d. 2006)
- 4 March
  - Paul W. S. Anderson, filmmaker, producer and screenwriter
  - Andrew Collins, radio DJ and journalist
  - John Murphy film composer
- 6 March – Ian Austin, politician
- 8 March – Claudia Webbe, Labour politician and MP
- 11 March – Lawrence Llewelyn-Bowen, television presenter
- 14 March – Caroline Foot, butterfly swimmer
- 15 March – Michael Watson, boxer
- 20 March – Jill Mortimer, Conservative politician, MP for Hartlepool
- 26 March – Kerry McCarthy, Labour politician, MP for Bristol East
- 28 March – Steve Bull, footballer
- 29 March – Louise Casey, social welfare administrator
- 30 March – Piers Morgan, tabloid journalist
- 1 April – Robert Steadman, composer
- 4 April – Sean Wilson, actor
- 6 April – Andy Walker, football player and pundit
- 27 April – Anna Chancellor, actress
- 1 May – Alice Beer, television presenter
- 3 May
  - Rob Brydon, comedian and actor
  - Michael Marshall Smith, novelist, screenwriter and short story writer
- 10 May – Darren Matthews, professional wrestler
- 13 May – Tasmin Little, violinist
- 15 May – Christina Lamb, journalist
- 17 May – Jeremy Vine, BBC radio and television presenter
- 26 May – Hazel Irvine, Scottish sportscaster and journalist
- 31 May – Steve White, drummer (The Style Council)
- 1 June
  - Andrew Havill, actor
  - Nigel Short, chess player
- 3 June – Jonathan Djanogly, lawyer and politician
- 7 June – Damien Hirst, artist
- 10 June – Elizabeth Hurley, model and actress
- 16 June – Mike Lynch, businessman (died 2024)
- 17 June – David Longdon, multi-instrumentalist and singer (died 2021)
- 19 June – Sadie Frost, fashion designer and actress
- 22 June – Maurice Core, boxer
- 23 June – Paul Arthurs, rock guitarist (Oasis)
- 24 June – Richard Lumsden, actor, writer, composer and musician
- 25 June – Anne McElvoy, journalist
- 26 June – Catherine White, swimmer
- 28 June – Saul Davies, rock multi-instrumentalist
- 30 June
  - Gary Pallister, footballer
  - Adam Roberts, science fiction and fantasy novelist
- 2 July
  - Tim Breacker, English footballer and coach
  - James Turner, tennis player
- 4 July
  - Gérard Watkins, English-French actor, playwright, director and songwriter
  - Jo Whiley, radio DJ
- 7 July – Jeremy Kyle, broadcaster and writer
- 9 July – David O'Hara, Scottish actor
- 10 July
  - David Ross, businessman
  - Doreen Waddell, singer (died 2002)
- 11 July – Tony Cottee, footballer
- 15 July – David Miliband, Labour MP
- 16 July – Dinah Rose, QC
- 17 July – Martin Kelly, musician, music manager, Heavenly record label manager, music publisher and author
- 18 July – Steve Webb, English academic and politician
- 19 July – Evelyn Glennie. Scottish percussionist
- 31 July – J. K. Rowling, English author
- 1 August – Sam Mendes, English stage and film director
- 4 August – Adam Afriyie, Conservative politician and MP for Windsor
- 6 August – Mark Speight, television presenter (died 2008)
- 14 August – Mark Francois, politician
- 15 August – Mark Labbett, quizzer
- 26 August – Marcus du Sautoy, mathematician
- 28 August – Paul Brummell, diplomat, UK Ambassador to Kazakhstan
- 29 August
  - Frances Ruffelle, actress and singer
  - David Webb, activist in Hong Kong (died 2026)
- 2 September – Lennox Lewis, boxer
- 3 September – Rachel Johnson, journalist
- 19 September
  - Goldie, music producer and DJ
  - Nick Pope, journalist (died 2026)
- 29 September – Phylis Smith, sprinter, Olympic medallist
- October – Philip Day, fashion retailing billionaire businessman
- 3 October – Rachel Maclean, politician
- 4 October – Marcus Bentley, actor, broadcaster and voice-over artist
- 11 October – Lennie James, actor, screenwriter and playwright
- 14 October – Steve Coogan, comedian and actor
- 15 October – Stephen Tompkinson, actor
- 22 October – John Wesley Harding, born Wesley Stace, singer-songwriter
- 28 October – David Warburton, politician (died 2025)
- 30 October – Gavin Rossdale, English musician
- 31 October
  - Denis Irwin, footballer
  - Rob Rackstraw, voice actor
- 4 November – Shaun Williamson, actor
- 7 November – Steve Parkin, English footballer and manager
- 8 November – Jason Nicolle (born 1965), English squash player
- 9 November – Bryn Terfel, opera singer
- 10 November
  - Sean Hughes, comedian (died 2017)
  - Eddie Irvine, Northern Irish racing driver
- 12 November – Eddie Mair, BBC radio and television presenter
- 14 November – Greg Hands, politician
- 16 November
  - Mark Benton, actor
  - Walter Stern, music video and film director
- 21 November
  - Magnus Fiennes, composer
  - Alexander Siddig, Sudanese-born actor
- 28 November – Peter Beagrie, English footballer
- 29 November – Lauren Child, children's fiction writer and illustrator
- 6 December – Paul Jenkins, comic book writer
- 8 December
  - Ned Dennehy, actor
  - David Harewood, actor and presenter
- 9 December – Russell Norman, restaurateur (died 2023)
- 12 December – Will Carling, English rugby player
- 13 December – Kate Peyton, journalist (murdered 2005)
- 25 December – Ed Davey, Liberal Democrat politician, MP for Kingston and Surbiton

== Deaths ==
- 4 January – T. S. Eliot, poet, Nobel Prize laureate (born 1888 in the United States)
- 11 January – A. V. Alexander, 1st Earl Alexander of Hillsborough, politician (born 1885)
- 24 January – Winston Churchill, Prime Minister of the United Kingdom, Nobel Prize in Literature laureate (born 1874)
- 28 January – Tich Freeman, English cricketer (born 1888)
- 23 February – Stan Laurel, English-born comic film actor (born 1890)
- 10 March – Beatrice Harrison, cellist (born 1892)
- 28 March
  - Mary, Princess Royal and Countess of Harewood, 6th Princess Royal (born 1897)
  - Richard Beesly, British Olympic gold medal rower (born 1907)
- 9 April – Sarah Ward, politician (born 1895)
- 21 April – Sir Edward Victor Appleton, English physicist, Nobel Prize laureate (born 1892)
- 3 May – Howard Spring, Welsh-born novelist (born 1889)
- 21 May – Sir Geoffrey de Havilland, aircraft designer (born 1882)
- 5 June – Eleanor Farjeon, children's writer (born 1881)
- 8 June – Cecil L'Estrange Malone, British politician, first communist Member of Parliament (born 1890)
- 29 June – Sir Martin Dunbar-Nasmith, admiral, recipient of the Victoria Cross (born 1883)
- 1 July – Wally Hammond, English cricketer (born 1903)
- 25 July – Freddie Mills, English boxer (born 1919)
- 2 September – Harry Hylton-Foster, Speaker of the House of Commons (born 1905)
- 14 September – J. W. Hearne, English cricketer (born 1891)
- 20 September – Arthur Holmes, geologist (born 1890)
- 25 September – Major-General Sir Henry Hugh Tudor, British soldier (born 1871)
- 27 September – Sir William Stanier, railway engineer and steam locomotive designer (LMS Coronation Class) (born 1876)
- 22 October – William Williams, Victoria Cross recipient (born 1890)
- 4 November – Sir Ifor Williams, academic (born 1881)
- 8 November – George Hall, politician (born 1881)
- 11 November – James Chuter Ede, Labour politician, Home Secretary (born 1882)
- 19 November – Una Ledingham, physician (born 1900)
- 25 November – Dame Myra Hess, English pianist (born 1890)
- 16 December – W. Somerset Maugham, English novelist (born 1874)
- 17 December – Hastings Ismay, 1st Baron Ismay, army officer (born 1887)
- 22 December – Richard Dimbleby, journalist and broadcaster (born 1913)
- 24 December
  - Sir John Black, industrialist, chairman of Standard-Triumph (born 1895)
  - David Margesson, politician (born 1890)
- 26 December – Llewelyn Alberic Emilius Price-Davies, Victoria Cross recipient (born 1878)
- 28 December – Jeremy Wolfenden, journalist and spy (born 1934)
- 30 December – Lilias Margaret Frances, Countess Bathurst, newspaper proprietor (born 1871)

== See also ==
- 1965 in British music
- 1965 in British television
- List of British films of 1965
