= 1965 in British television =

This is a list of British television related events from 1965.

== Events ==
=== January ===
- January – The BBC collaborates with Ireland's RTÉ on a television broadcast as Irish Taoiseach Seán Lemass and Prime Minister of Northern Ireland Terence O'Neill meet for the first time in Belfast.
- 2 January – World of Sport premieres on ITV with Eamonn Andrews as its first presenter.
- 9 January – The comedy sketch show Not Only... But Also, featuring Peter Cook and Dudley Moore, debuts on BBC2. It also features the first of three guest appearances by John Lennon.
- 12 January – Doctor Who begins airing in Australia on ABC by first being shown in Perth. It later airs for the first time in several states; including Sydney, Adelaide, Brisbane and Melbourne during January and the next two months.

=== March ===
- 20 March – "Poupée de cire, poupée de son", sung by France Gall (music and lyrics by Serge Gainsbourg), wins the Eurovision Song Contest 1965 (staged in Naples) for Luxembourg. The British entry, Kathy Kirby singing "I Belong", comes second.
- 26 March – Border Television begins broadcasting to the Isle of Man.

=== April ===
- 7 April – BBC1 airs Three Clear Sundays, a Wednesday Play about the events leading to a man's conviction for capital murder. It is repeated on BBC2 on 16 July.

=== May ===
- 30 May – A televised tribute to the late British bandleader and impresario Jack Hylton called The Stars Shine for Jack is held in London at the Theatre Royal, Drury Lane.

=== June ===
- 18 June – The last edition of Tonight is broadcast on BBC1.
- 24 June – BBC1 begins showing the American spy series The Man from U.N.C.L.E., starring Robert Vaughn as Napoleon Solo and David McCallum as Illya Kuryakin.
- 27 June – The last episode of science-fiction marionette series Stingray is broadcast on ITV.

=== July ===
- 5 July – Anglia Television starts broadcasting on VHF channel 6 from Sandy Heath transmitting station, extending coverage into Bedfordshire, Cambridgeshire and Northamptonshire. Until late 1966, there are no morning broadcasts from this transmitter due to a clash with the Mullard Radio Astronomy Observatory.
- 7 July – The science and technology programme Tomorrow's World makes its debut on BBC1.
- 22 July – The pilot episode for the sitcom Till Death Us Do Part is broadcast on BBC1.

=== August ===
- 1 August
  - Cigarette adverts are banned from British television. Pipe tobacco and cigar adverts will continue until 1991.
  - Television and radio licence fees are increased.
- 6 August – The War Game, a drama-documentary by director Peter Watkins depicting the events of a future nuclear attack on the United Kingdom, is pulled from its planned transmission in BBC1's The Wednesday Play anthology strand. The BBC has been pressured into this move by the British government, which does not want much of the play's content to become public. It is released to cinemas, and wins the 1966 Academy Award for Documentary Feature; the BBC finally screens the play in 1985.

=== September ===
- 12 September – BBC2 Wales goes on the air. To introduce the service, BBC2 airs a programme titled BBC-2 Comes to Wales, featuring the Secretary of State for Wales James Griffiths, the Lord Mayor of Cardiff, the Deputy Mayor of Newport, Chairman of the Broadcasting Council for Wales Professor Glanmor Williams, BBC2 Controller David Attenborough, and BBC2 Wales Controller Alun Oldfield-Davies.
- 28 September – "The Town of No Return", the first episode of the fourth series of The Avengers, introduces the character of Emma Peel played by Diana Rigg.
- 30 September – Gerry and Sylvia Anderson's science-fiction marionette series (with electronic lip syncing known as Supermarionation) Thunderbirds premieres on ITV.

=== October ===
- 2 October – American science-fiction series Lost in Space debuts on ITV. It is adapted for the feature film version in 1998 and then again for the revived television series in 2018, after the original series ends in 1968.
- 4 October
  - BBC2 begins broadcasting across the Midlands.
  - 24 Hours premieres on BBC1.
  - Football-based drama serial United! premieres on BBC1.
  - Science-fiction anthology series Out of the Unknown premieres on BBC2.
  - The BBC announces plans to introduce a new service for Asian immigrants starting the following week.
- 10 October – The BBC Asian service, broadcast on Sunday mornings, launches with a programme called In Logon Se Miliye. At the start of 1966, it would be renamed Apna Hi Ghar Samajhiye (which is also the name of the Asian Service's radio programme which debuted at the same time that In Logon Se Miliye), which was replaced in 1968 by Nai Zindagi Naya Jeevan. In June 1982, it would be relaunched as Asian Magazine.
- 18 October – The British version of children's stop-motion animation The Magic Roundabout, with narration written and read by Eric Thompson, debuts on BBC1; it continues until 1977.
- 31 October – BBC2 in the North of England goes on the air.

=== November ===
- 4 November – The current affairs and documentary series Man Alive makes its debut on BBC2.
- 13 November – During a discussion on BBC1 satire-and-chat show BBC-3 about theatre censorship, critic Kenneth Tynan supposedly becomes the first person to say "fuck" on British television (although research indicates that the word has been used at least twice before). He claims that the word no longer shocks anyone but the storm which results forces the BBC to make a public apology.
- 29 November – Mary Whitehouse and colleagues found the National Viewers' and Listeners' Association, succeeding the Clean-Up TV Campaign.
- November – BBC2 begins broadcasting across Southampton, Portsmouth, Bournemouth and the Isle of Wight.

=== December ===
- 13 December – The children's storytelling series Jackanory makes its debut on BBC1. It runs until 1996 and is briefly revived in 2006.
- 20 December – Anglia starts broadcasting on VHF channel 20 from Belmont transmitting station, extending coverage into Lincolnshire, the East Riding of Yorkshire and northern parts of Norfolk.
- 25 December – Christmas Day:
  - ITV shows the American animated Christmas special Rudolph the Red-Nosed Reindeer, narrated by Burl Ives.
  - The episode of Doctor Who broadcast on BBC1, "The Feast of Steven", is a largely self-contained comedic one which concludes with the Doctor breaking the fourth wall to wish viewers a happy Christmas.

=== Undated ===
- The Membury transmitting station in Berkshire is erected by the Independent Television Authority.

== Debuts ==
=== BBC1 ===
- 6 January – Jonny Quest (1964–1965)
- 9 January – Not Only... But Also (1965–1970)
- 28 February – Alexander Graham Bell (1965)
- 2 March – The Walrus and the Carpenter (1965)
- 22 March – A Man Called Harry Brent (1965)
- 24 March – The Airbase (1965)
- 27 March – The Flying Swan (1965)
- 31 March – Going for a Song (1965–1977, 1995–2002)
- 8 April – The Wars of the Roses (1965)
- 11 April – A Tale of Two Cities (1965)
- 13 April – The Bed-Sit Girl (1965–1966)
- 18 April – And So to Ted (1965)
- 23 April – Lil (1965–1966)
- 30 May – The World of Wooster (1965–1967)
- 5 June – The Val Doonican Show (1965–1970)
- 20 June – Poison Island (1965)
- 24 June – The Man from U.N.C.L.E. (1964–1968)
- 6 July – The Lance Percival Show (1965–1966)
- 7 July – The Troubleshooters (1965–1972)
- 7 July – Tomorrow's World (1965–2003)
- 15 July – The Illustrated Weekly Hudd (1965–1967)
- 22 July – Till Death Us Do Part (1965–1975)
- 29 July – Pogles Wood (1965–1968)
- 1 August – Heiress of Garth (1965)
- 3 August – 199 Park Lane (1965)
- 4 August – The Wednesday Thriller (1965)
- 26 August – Moulded in Earth (1965)
- 12 September – Hereward the Wake (1965)
- 2 October – BBC-3 (1965–1966)
- 4 October – United! (1965–1967)
- 4 October – 24 Hours (1965–1972)
- 5 October – The Newcomers (1965–1969)
- 6 October – Hector Heathcote (1959–1963)
- 8 October – The Mask of Janus (1965)
- 9 October – The Munsters (1964–1966)
- 12 October – The Adventures of Robinson Crusoe (1965–1966)
- 16 October – Get Smart (1965–1970)
- 18 October – The Magic Roundabout (1965–1977)
- 19 October – Play of the Month (1965–1983)
- 23 November – Hudd (1965)
- 13 December – Jackanory (1965–1996, 2006)
- 17 December – Barney Is My Darling (1965–1966)

=== BBC2 ===
- 9 January – Not Only... But Also (1965–1966; 1970)
- 18 January – Hit and Run (1965)
- 27 January – Night Train to Surbiton (1965)
- 11 February – Naked Island (1965)
- 21 February – The Mill on the Floss (1965)
- 22 March – A Man Called Harry Brent (1965)
- 5 May – Call It What You Like (1965)
- 9 May – The Scarlet and the Black (1965)
- 13 May – Londoners (1965)
- 13 June – The Rise and Fall of César Birotteau (1965)
- 11 July – Jury Room (1965)
- 19 July – Legend of Death (1965)
- 31 July – Gaslight Theatre (1965)
- 8 September – A Slight Case of... (1965)
- 2 October – For Whom the Bell Tolls (1965)
- 4 October – Out of the Unknown (1965–1971)
- 7 October – Thirty-Minute Theatre (1965–1973)
- 17 October – Call My Bluff (1965–1988, 1994, 1996–2005)
- 17 October – An Enemy of the State (1965)
- 4 November – Man Alive (1965–1981)
- 5 December – The Big Spender (1965–1966)

=== ITV ===
- 2 January – World of Sport (1965–1985)
- 19 January – Front Page Story (1965)
- 23 January – Public Eye (1965–1975)
- 23 February – Mr and Mrs (1965–1988; 1995–1999)
- 27 February – The Worker (1965–1970; 1978)
- 13 April – Orlando (1965–1968)
- 30 April – Six Shades of Black (1965)
- 8 May – Undermind (1965)
- 2 June – Pardon the Expression (1965–1966)
- 11 June – The Man in Room 17 (1965–1966)
- 16 June – Deckie Learner (1965)
- 2 August – Riviera Police (1965)
- 11 August – Six of the Best (1965)
- 21 August – Broad and Narrow (1965)
- 21 August – The Frankie Vaughan Show (1965–1966)
- 10 September – Blackmail (1965–1966)
- 30 September – Thunderbirds (1965–1966)
- 1 October – The Addams Family (1964–1966)
- 2 October
  - Lost in Space (1965–1968, 2018–2021)
  - Knock on Any Door (1965–1966)
- 19 October –Object Z (1965)
- 8 November – My Mother the Car (1965–1966)
- 13 December – The Power Game (1965–1969)
- 16 December – Court Martial (1965–1966)
- 25 December – The Bruce Forsyth Show (1965–1969)
- Unknown
  - Flipper (1964–1967)
  - Peyton Place (1964–1969)

== Television shows ==
=== Changes of network affiliation ===
| Shows | Moved from | Moved to |
|---|---|---|
| Match of the Day | BBC2 | BBC1 |

== Continuing television shows ==
=== 1920s ===
- BBC Wimbledon (1927–1939, 1946–2019, 2021–2024)

=== 1930s ===
- Trooping the Colour (1937–1939, 1946–2019, 2023–present)
- The Boat Race (1938–1939, 1946–2019, 2021–present)
- BBC Cricket (1939, 1946–1999, 2020–2024)

=== 1940s ===
- The Ed Sullivan Show (1948–1971)
- Come Dancing (1949–1998)

=== 1950s ===
- Andy Pandy (1950–1970, 2002–2005)
- Watch with Mother (1952–1975)
- The Good Old Days (1953–1983)
- Panorama (1953–present)
- Sunday Night at the London Palladium (1955–1967, 1973–1974)
- Take Your Pick! (1955–1968, 1992–1998)
- Double Your Money (1955–1968)
- Dixon of Dock Green (1955–1976)
- Crackerjack (1955–1970, 1972–1984, 2020–2021)
- ITV Wimbledon (1956–1968)
- Opportunity Knocks (1956–1978, 1987–1990)
- This Week (1956–1978, 1986–1992)
- Armchair Theatre (1956–1974)
- What the Papers Say (1956–2008)
- The Sky at Night (1957–present)
- Blue Peter (1958–present)
- Grandstand (1958–2007)

=== 1960s ===
- The Flintstones (1960–1966)
- Coronation Street (1960–present)
- The Avengers (1961–1969)
- Songs of Praise (1961–present)
- Hugh and I (1962–1967)
- The Saint (1962–1969)
- Z-Cars (1962–1978)
- Animal Magic (1962–1983)
- Ready Steady Go! (1963–1966)
- Doctor Who (1963–1989, 1996, 2005–present)
- World in Action (1963–1998)
- The Likely Lads (1964–1966)
- Redcap (1964–1966)
- The Wednesday Play (1964–1970)
- Top of the Pops (1964–2006)
- Match of the Day (1964–present)
- Crossroads (1964–1988, 2001–2003)
- Play School (1964–1988)

== Ending this year ==
- Rag, Tag and Bobtail (1953–1965)
- Picture Book (1955–1965)
- Monitor (1958–1965)
- Noggin the Nog (1959–1965, 1966–1982)
- Sykes and a... (1960–1965)
- Compact (1962–1965)
- Steptoe and Son (1962–1965, 1970–1974)
- The Beat Room (1964–1965)
- Not So Much a Programme, More a Way of Life (1964–1965)
- The Sullavan Brothers (1964–1965)

== Births ==
- 4 January – Julia Ormond, British actress
- 9 January – Joely Richardson, British actress
- 14 January – Hugh Fearnley-Whittingstall, English chef
- 15 January – James Nesbitt, Northern Irish actor
- 27 January – Alan Cumming, Scottish actor
- 22 February – John Leslie, television presenter
- 26 February – Alison Armitage, English model and actress
- 11 March – Lawrence Llewelyn-Bowen, British television presenter
- 22 March – Emma Wray, actress
- 30 March – Piers Morgan, British tabloid journalist
- 4 April – Sean Wilson, British actor
- 21 April – Jacquie Beltrao, sports presenter
- 26 April – Juliet Morris, presenter
- 27 April – Anna Chancellor, British actress
- 29 April – Rosie Rowell, actress
- 3 May – Michael Marshall Smith, novelist, screenwriter and short story writer
- 17 May
  - Alice Beer, television presenter
  - Jeremy Vine, British BBC radio and television presenter
- 19 June – Simon O'Brien, television actor and radio presenter
- 4 July – Jo Whiley, broadcast music presenter
- 8 July – Matthew Wright, journalist and television presenter
- 6 August – Mark Speight, British television presenter (died 2008)
- 16 September – Lorne Spicer, presenter (Cash in the Attic)
- 24 September – Sheryl Gascoigne, television personality
- 14 October – Steve Coogan, British comedian and actor
- 15 October – Stephen Tompkinson, British actor
- 31 October – Rob Rackstraw, British voice actor
- 4 November – Shaun Williamson, British actor
- 10 November – Sean Hughes, English-born Irish comedian (died 2017)
- 12 November – Eddie Mair, British BBC radio and television presenter
- 16 November – Mark Benton, actor
- 21 November – Alexander Siddig, Sudanese-born actor

== Deaths ==
- 23 February – Stan Laurel, English-born comedian, surviving half of Laurel and Hardy, aged 74
- 22 December – Richard Dimbleby, journalist and broadcaster, aged 52, testicular cancer

== See also ==
- 1965 in British music
- 1965 in British radio
- 1965 in the United Kingdom
- List of British films of 1965
