= List of British films of 1965 =

A list of films produced in the United Kingdom in 1965 (see 1965 in film):

== 1965 ==
Title	Director	Cast	Genre	Notes
1965
The Alphabet Murders	Frank Tashlin	Tony Randall, Anita Ekberg, Robert Morley	Mystery	
The Amorous Adventures of Moll Flanders	Terence Young	Kim Novak, Richard Johnson	Comedy	
The Battle of the Villa Fiorita	Delmer Daves	Maureen O'Hara, Richard Todd, Rossano Brazzi	Drama	
Be My Guest	Lance Comfort	David Hemmings, Avril Angers	Musical	
The Bedford Incident	James B. Harris	Richard Widmark, Sidney Poitier	Thriller	
The Big Job	Gerald Thomas	Sid James, Sylvia Syms, Dick Emery	Comedy	
The Brigand of Kandahar	John Gilling	Ronald Lewis, Oliver Reed	Colonial adventure	
Bunny Lake Is Missing	Otto Preminger	Laurence Olivier, Carol Lynley, Noël Coward	Mystery/thriller	
Carry On Cowboy	Gerald Thomas	Sid James, Kenneth Williams	Comedy	
Catacombs	Gordon Hessler	Gary Merrill, Georgina Cookson	Horror	
Catch Us If You Can	John Boorman	Dave Clark, Julian Holloway	Drama/comedy	Boorman's first film as director
City of Fear	Peter Bezencenet	Paul Maxwell, Terry Moore, Marisa Mell	Thriller	Co-production with West Germany
City Under the Sea	Jacques Tourneur	Vincent Price, David Tomlinson, Tab Hunter	Sci-fi/adventure	
The Collector	William Wyler	Terence Stamp, Samantha Eggar	Drama	
The Crooked Road	Don Chaffey	Robert Ryan, Stewart Granger	Thriller	
Cup Fever	David Bracknell	Bernard Cribbins, David Lodge	Sports/family	
Curse of the Fly	Don Sharp	Brian Donlevy, George Baker	Horror	
Curse of Simba	Lindsay Shonteff	Bryant Haliday, Dennis Price	Horror	
Darling	John Schlesinger	Julie Christie, Laurence Harvey, Dirk Bogarde	Drama	Number 83 in the list of BFI Top 100 British films; winner of three Academy Awards and an award at Moscow
Devils of Darkness	Lance Comfort	William Sylvester, Carole Gray	Horror	
Dr. Terror's House of Horrors	Freddie Francis	Christopher Lee, Max Adrian	Horror	
Dr. Who and the Daleks	Gordon Flemyng	Peter Cushing, Roy Castle, Jenny Linden	Science fiction	
Doctor Zhivago	David Lean	Omar Sharif, Julie Christie, Rod Steiger	Drama	Number 27 in the list of BFI Top 100 British films; winner of five Academy Awards
The Early Bird	Robert Asher	Norman Wisdom, Edward Chapman, Bryan Pringle	Comedy	
Every Day's a Holiday	James Hill	John Leyton, Michael Sarne	Musical/comedy	
The Face of Fu Manchu	Don Sharp	Christopher Lee, Nigel Green	Thriller	Co-production with West Germany
Fanatic	Silvio Narizzano	Tallulah Bankhead, Stefanie Powers	Horror	
Ferry Cross the Mersey	Jeremy Summers	Gerry Marsden, Cilla Black, Jimmy Savile	Musical	
Four in the Morning	Anthony Simmons	Ann Lynn, Brian Phelan, Judi Dench, Norman Rodway, Joe Melia	Drama	BAFTA Film Award
Game for Three Losers	Gerry O'Hara	Michael Gough, Mark Eden	Drama	
Genghis Khan	Henry Levin	Stephen Boyd, Omar Sharif	Historical	Co-production
Gonks Go Beat	Robert Hartford-Davis	Kenneth Connor, Frank Thornton, Lulu	Sci-fi/musical	
He Who Rides a Tiger	Charles Crichton	Tom Bell, Judi Dench, Paul Rogers	Crime drama	
Help!	Richard Lester	The Beatles	Musical/comedy	
The Heroes of Telemark	Anthony Mann	Kirk Douglas, Richard Harris	World War II	
A High Wind in Jamaica	Alexander Mackendrick	Anthony Quinn, James Coburn	Adventure	
The Hill	Sidney Lumet	Sean Connery, Harry Andrews	World War II/drama	
Hysteria	Freddie Francis	Robert Webber, Jennifer Jayne	Thriller	
The Intelligence Men	Robert Asher	Eric Morecambe, Ernie Wise	Spy comedy	
The Ipcress File	Sidney J. Furie	Michael Caine, Nigel Green, Sue Lloyd	Spy/thriller	Number 59 in the list of BFI Top 100 British films
Joey Boy	Frank Launder	Harry H. Corbett, Stanley Baxter	Comedy	
The Knack ...and How to Get It	Richard Lester	Michael Crawford, Rita Tushingham	Comedy	Won the Palme d'Or at the 1965 Cannes Film Festival
Lady L	Peter Ustinov	Sophia Loren, Paul Newman, David Niven	Comedy	
Licensed to Kill	Lindsay Shonteff	Tom Adams, John Arnatt, Peter Bull	Spy comedy/thriller	Released as The Second Best Secret Agent in the Whole Wide World in the US
Life at the Top	Ted Kotcheff	Laurence Harvey, Jean Simmons	Drama	
The Liquidator	Jack Cardiff	Rod Taylor, Trevor Howard, Jill St. John, David Tomlinson	Spy comedy thriller	
The Little Ones	Jim O'Connolly	Carl Gonzales, Kim Smith	Family	
Lord Jim	Richard Brooks	Peter O'Toole, James Mason, Eli Wallach	Drama/adventure	
Masquerade	Basil Dearden	Cliff Robertson, Jack Hawkins	Comedy/thriller	
Mozambique	Ralph Lynn	Steve Cochran, Hildegard Knef, Paul Hubschmid	Drama	Anglo-German co-production
The Murder Game	Sidney Salkow	Marla Landi, Ken Scott	Crime	
The Nanny	Seth Holt	Bette Davis, Wendy Craig	Horror	
The Night Caller	John Gilling	John Saxon, Alfred Burke, Maurice Denham, Warren Mitchell	Horror	
90 Degrees in the Shade	Jiří Weiss	Anne Heywood, James Booth	Crime/drama	Co-production with Czechoslovakia
Operation Crossbow	Michael Anderson	George Peppard, Sophia Loren, Trevor Howard	Spy/thriller	
Othello	Stuart Burge	Laurence Olivier, Maggie Smith, Frank Finlay	Literary drama	
The Party's Over	Guy Hamilton	Oliver Reed, Eddie Albert	Drama	
The Pleasure Girls	Gerry O'Hara	Francesca Annis, Ian McShane, Klaus Kinski	Drama	
Promise Her Anything	Arthur Hiller	Warren Beatty, Leslie Caron	Comedy	
Repulsion	Roman Polanski	Catherine Deneuve, Ian Hendry, John Fraser	Thriller	Won the Jury Prize at the 15th Berlin International Film Festival
Return from the Ashes	J. Lee Thompson	Maximilian Schell, Samantha Eggar	Thriller	
The Return of Mr. Moto	Ernest Morris	Henry Silva, Terence Longdon	Thriller	
Rotten to the Core	John Boulting	Anton Rodgers, Charlotte Rampling, Eric Sykes	Comedy	
San Ferry Ann	Jeremy Summers	Wilfrid Brambell, David Lodge	Comedy	
Sands of the Kalahari	Cy Endfield	Stuart Whitman, Stanley Baker, Susannah York	Adventure	
Scruggs	David Hart	Susannah York, Ben Carruthers	Drama	
The Secret of My Success	Andrew L. Stone	James Booth, Shirley Jones, Honor Blackman	Comedy	
Shakespeare Wallah	James Ivory	Felicity Kendal, Shashi Kapoor, Madhur Jaffrey	Drama	
She	Robert Day	Ursula Andress, Peter Cushing, John Richardson	Adventure	Based on the novel by H. Rider Haggard
The Skull	Freddie Francis	Peter Cushing, Patrick Wymark	Horror	
Spaceflight IC-1	Bernard Knowles	Bill Williams, Kathleen Breck	Sci-fi	
The Spy Who Came in from the Cold	Martin Ritt	Richard Burton, Claire Bloom, Oskar Werner	Spy thriller	
A Study in Terror	James Hill	John Neville, Donald Houston, John Fraser	Mystery	
Ten Little Indians	George Pollock	Shirley Eaton, Stanley Holloway, Wilfrid Hyde-White	Mystery	
Those Magnificent Men in Their Flying Machines	Ken Annakin	Stuart Whitman, Sarah Miles, James Fox	Comedy	
Three Hats for Lisa	Sidney Hayers	Joe Brown, Sophie Hardy, Una Stubbs	Musical	
Thunderball	Terence Young	Sean Connery, Claudine Auger, Adolfo Celi	Spy/action/James Bond	
The Truth About Spring	Richard Thorpe	Hayley Mills, John Mills, James MacArthur	Adventure	
Twenty-Four Hours to Kill	Peter Bezencenet	Lex Barker, Mickey Rooney, Walter Slezak	Thriller	
Up Jumped a Swagman	Christopher Miles	Frank Ifield, Annette Andre, Suzy Kendall	Comedy/musical	
The War Game	Peter Watkins	Michael Aspel	Docu-drama	Made for TV though released in cinemas
Where the Spies Are	Val Guest	David Niven, Françoise Dorléac	Spy thriller	
Wholly Communion	Peter Whitehead	Allen Ginsberg, Adrian Mitchell	Documentary short	
You Must Be Joking!	Michael Winner	Lionel Jeffries, Terry-Thomas	Comedy	
Young Cassidy	Jack Cardiff	Rod Taylor, Julie Christie, Maggie Smith, Michael Redgrave	Drama	

== See also ==
- 1965 in British music
- 1965 in British radio
- 1965 in British television
- 1965 in the United Kingdom
