= 1965 in British music =

This is a summary of 1965 in music in the United Kingdom.

== Events ==
- 15 January – The Who release their first hit single "I Can't Explain" in the UK. It was released a month earlier in the US.
- 17 January – The Rolling Stones drummer Charlie Watts' book, Ode to a High Flying Bird, a tribute to jazz great Charlie Parker, is published.
- 21 January
  - The Animals' show at New York's Apollo Theater is canceled after the U.S. Immigration Department forces the group to leave the theater.
  - The Rolling Stones and Roy Orbison travel to Sydney to begin their Australian tour.
- 23 January – "Downtown" hits #1 in the US singles chart, making Petula Clark the first British female vocalist to reach the coveted position since the arrival of The Beatles.
- 24 January – The Animals appear a second time on The Ed Sullivan Show.
- 27 January – Paul Simon broadcasts on BBC radio for the first time, on the Five to Ten show, discussing and playing thirteen songs, twelve of which would appear on his May-recorded and August-released UK-only solo album, The Paul Simon Song Book.
- 6 February – Donovan gets his widest audience so far when he makes the first of three appearances on "Ready, Steady, Go!".
- 12 February – NME reports that the Beatles will star in a film adaptation of Richard Condon's novel A Talent for Loving. The story is about a 2,253-kilometer (1,400 mi) horse race that takes place in the old west. The film is never made.
- 24 February –
  - The Beatles begin filming their second film, Help!
  - Richard Rodney Bennett's opera The Mines of Sulphur is premièred at Sadler's Wells Theatre in London.
- 20 March – Kathy Kirby, singing the UK entry "I Belong", finishes second in the 10th Eurovision Song Contest in Naples, Italy, behind France Gall, representing Luxembourg.
- 23 March – Benjamin Britten is appointed to the Order of Merit (OM).
- April – Michael Tippett is invited as guest composer to the music festival in Aspen, Colorado. The visit leads to major changes in his style.
- 11 April – The New Musical Express poll winners' concert takes place featuring performances by The Beatles, The Animals, The Rolling Stones, Freddie and the Dreamers, the Kinks, the Searchers, Herman's Hermits, The Seekers, The Moody Blues, Wayne Fontana and the Mindbenders, Donovan, Cilla Black, Dusty Springfield and Tom Jones.
- 26 April – 10 May – Bob Dylan tours the UK, concluding his tour of Europe, and ending with two concerts at London's Royal Albert Hall with audience members including The Beatles and Donovan. The tour features in the film Dont Look Back.
- 5 May – Alan Price leaves The Animals, to be replaced temporarily by Mick Gallagher and permanently by Dave Rowberry.
- 6 May – Keith Richards and Mick Jagger begin work on "Satisfaction" in their Clearwater, Florida hotel room. Richards comes up with the classic guitar riff while playing around with his brand-new Gibson "Fuzz box".
- 8 May – The British Commonwealth comes closer than it ever had, or would, to a clean sweep of the US Hot 100's top 10, lacking only the #2 slot.
- 24 May - 26 May -- The British Song Festival (in Brighton), featuring performances by Billy J Kramer and the Dakotas, Cliff Bennett and the Rebel Rousers, Dave Berry, Elkie Brooks, Helen Shapiro, The Ivy League, Kenny Lynch, Lulu, Manfred Mann, Mark Wynter, Marianne Faithfull, Maureen Evans, The Moody Blues, Vince Hill, and Wayne Fontana and the Mindbenders (Toney, Ben. "The Amazing Radio London Adventure".)
- 30 May – The Animals appear for a third time on The Ed Sullivan Show.
- 12 June – The Beatles are appointed Members of the British Empire (MBE) by the Queen. With no tradition of awarding popular entertainers such honours, a number of previous recipients complain and protest.
- 14 June – Paul McCartney records "Yesterday".
- July – John Cale, with his new collaborators Lou Reed and Sterling Morrison, makes a demo tape which he tries to pass on to Marianne Faithfull. These are the beginnings of the Velvet Underground.
- 5 July – Maria Callas gives her last operatic performance, in the title role of Tosca, at the Royal Opera House, Covent Garden.
- 13 July – The Beatles receive a record five Ivor Novello Awards.
- 4 August – Iain Hamilton's Cantos receives its world première at The Proms, performed by the BBC Symphony Orchestra and conducted by Norman Del Mar.
- 6 August
  - The Small Faces release "Whatcha Gonna Do About It", their first single.
  - The Beatles release the soundtrack to their second movie Help!
- 27 August – The Beatles visit Elvis Presley at his home in Bel-Air. It is the only time the band and the singer meet.
- 11 September – The Last Night of The Proms is conducted by Sir Malcolm Sargent, with Josephine Veasey as soloist for the traditional rendition of "Rule, Britannia".
- 30 September – Donovan appears on Shindig! in the U.S. and plays Buffy Sainte-Marie's "Universal Soldier".
- 17 October – The Animals appear for a fourth time on The Ed Sullivan Show.
- 5 November – The Who release their iconic single "My Generation" in the UK. This song contains the famous line: "I hope I die before I get old"
- 3 December
  - The Beatles release their album Rubber Soul, along with the double A-sided single "Day Tripper / We Can Work It Out". George Harrison's performance on the sitar on the track "Norwegian Wood" leads to his becoming a pupil of Ravi Shankar.
  - The Who release their debut album My Generation.

== Charts ==
- See UK No.1 Hits of 1965

== Classical music ==
=== New works ===
- Benjamin Britten – Songs and Proverbs of William Blake for baritone and piano
- Michael Tippett – The Vision of St Augustine (oratorio)
- William Walton – The Twelve, to a text by W. H. Auden
- Hugh Wood – Scenes from Comus

== Musical theatre ==
- 24 August – The Passion Flower Hotel (music & lyrics by John Barry and Trevor Peacock, book by Wolf Mankowitz) opens at the Prince of Wales Theatre after a run in Manchester.
- 15 December – Charlie Girl (music & lyrics by David Heneker and John Taylor) opens at the Adelphi Theatre, London, starring Joe Brown and Anna Neagle.
- 20 December – Twang! (music, lyrics and book by Lionel Bart) opens at the Shaftesbury Theatre, starring Ronnie Corbett, Barbara Windsor and James Booth.

== Film and incidental music ==
- John Barry – The Ipcress File, starring Michael Caine.
- Ron Goodwin – Those Magnificent Men in their Flying Machines, starring Sarah Miles, Robert Morley, Terry-Thomas and James Fox.
- Elisabeth Lutyens –
  - Dr. Terror's House of Horrors directed by Freddie Francis, starring Peter Cushing and Christopher Lee.
  - The Skull directed by Freddie Francis, starring Peter Cushing and Christopher Lee.
- Robert Simpson – Incidental music to Ibsen's play The Pretenders.

== Musical films ==
- Be My Guest, starring David Hemmings and Steve Marriott
- Catch Us If You Can, starring the Dave Clark Five
- Every Day's a Holiday, starring John Leyton, Michael Sarne and Peter Birrell.
- Ferry Cross the Mersey, starring Gerry and the Pacemakers
- Help!, starring The Beatles
- Three Hats for Lisa, starring Joe Brown, Sid James, and Una Stubbs
- Up Jumped a Swagman, starring Frank Ifield, Annette Andre, and Suzy Kendall.

== Jazz ==
- Stan Tracey – Under Milk Wood

== Births ==
- 1 January – John Digweed, DJ, record producer, and actor
- 4 January – Beth Gibbons, vocalist (Portishead)
- 6 January – Murray McLachlan, Scottish pianist
- 10 January – Nathan Moore, singer (Brother Beyond)
- 14 January – Slick Rick, rapper
- 20 January – Heather Small, soul singer (M People)
- 22 January – Andrew Roachford, singer-songwriter and keyboard player
- 12 February – David Westlake, singer-songwriter and guitarist (The Servants)
- 23 March – Marti Pellow, vocalist (Wet Wet Wet)
- 1 April – Robert Steadman, composer
- 7 April – Yorkie (David Palmer), bassist (Space)
- 15 April – Graeme Clark, bass guitarist (Wet Wet Wet)
- 13 May – Tasmin Little, violinist
- 23 May – Simon Gilbert, drummer (Suede)
- 31 May – Lisa I'Anson, DJ
- 6 June – David White, guitarist (Brother Beyond)
- 7 June – Billy Reeves, English guitarist, songwriter, and producer (Theaudience)
- 23 June – Paul Arthurs, guitarist (Oasis and The Rain)
- 4 July – Jo Whiley, radio DJ
- 6 July – Anthony Marwood, English violinist
- 19 July – Dame Evelyn Glennie, percussionist
- 28 July – Nick Banks, drummer (Pulp)
- 13 September – Zak Starkey, drummer, son of Ringo Starr
- 19 September – Goldie, electronic music artist and DJ
- 2 October – Roy Powell, jazz pianist, organist and composer
- 12 October – Phil Creswick, singer (Big Fun)
- 9 November – Bryn Terfel, operatic bass-baritone
- 29 October – Richard Ayres, composer and music teacher.
- 21 December – Stuart Mitchell, pianist and composer
- date unknown
  - Gordon McPherson, Scottish composer
  - Peter Nardone, conductor, singer and composer
- Date unknown – Caroline Dale, cellist

== Deaths ==
- 8 February – Winifred Christie, pianist and composer, 82
- 8 June – Erik Chisholm, composer, 61
- 18 June – George Melachrino, conductor, singer and composer, 56
- 2 July – Charles Kennedy Scott, organist and choral conductor, 88
- 4 July – Edward Sackville-West, 5th Baron Sackville, music critic, 63
- 24 July – Irene Browne, actress and singer, 69
- 9 October – Ernest Read, conductor, organist, and music educator, 86
- 10 October – Herbert Kennedy Andrews, organist and composer, 61
- 25 November – Dame Myra Hess, pianist, 75
- 20 December – Henry George Farmer, musicologist, 83

== See also ==
- 1965 in British radio
- 1965 in British television
- 1965 in the United Kingdom
- List of British films of 1965
