= 1965 Essex County Council election =

1965 UK local government election

- 25 March 1965

All 77 seats to Essex County Council 39 seats needed for a majority
- Turnout: 27.7%

	First party	Second party	Third party
Party	Conservative	Labour	Liberal
Seats won	47	29	1
Popular vote	88,214	69,886	8,522
Percentage	52.3%	41.4%	5.1%
Council control after election
Conservative

The 1965 Essex County Council election took place on 25 March 1965 to elect members of Essex County Council in England.

== Background ==
The election was due to take place in 1964 as part of the normal three-year cycle. The election was delayed for one year and the terms of councillors elected in 1961 were extended. Councillors elected in 1965 served a two-year term and the normal cycle resumed in 1967. This was done to coincide with the creation of Greater London on 1 April 1965 and the large transfer of territory and population from Essex.

== Summary ==
1965 Essex County Council election
Party	Seats	Gains	Losses	Net gain/loss	Seats %	Votes %	Votes	+/−
Conservative	47				61.0	52.3	88,214	
Labour	29				37.7	41.4	69,886	
Liberal	1				1.3	5.1	8,522	
Independent	0				0.0	1.1	1,884	
Communist	0				0.0	0.1	131	

== Division results ==
Results from 4 divisions are missing from the source document and are therefore not listed here.

=== Bardfield ===
Bardfield
Party	Candidate	Votes	%
Conservative	Edith Borthwick	Unopposed	
Registered electors		5,966	
Conservative win			

=== Basildon (Billericay) ===
Basildon (Billericay)
Party	Candidate	Votes	%
Conservative	Coker	1,888	80.6
Labour	Buckley	454	19.4
Majority		1,434	61.2
Turnout		2,343	26.2
Registered electors		8,947	
Conservative win			

=== Basildon (Central) ===
Basildon (Central)
Party	Candidate	Votes	%
Labour	Robert Payne	708	60.6
Conservative	Shackleton	460	39.4
Majority		248	21.2
Turnout		1,168	14.6
Registered electors		8,018	
Labour win			

=== Basildon (Fryerns) ===
Basildon (Fryerns)
Party	Candidate	Votes	%
Labour	Turner	755	66.3
Conservative	Nicholls	322	28.3
Communist	Denny	62	5.4
Majority		433	38.0
Turnout		1,139	14.1
Registered electors		8,079	
Labour win			

=== Basildon (Laindon) ===
Basildon (Laindon)
Party	Candidate	Votes	%
Labour	Violet Palmer	696	59.6
Conservative	de-la Bertauche	472	40.4
Majority		224	19.2
Turnout		1,168	16.1
Registered electors		7,253	
Labour win			

=== Basildon (Langdon Hills) ===
Basildon (Langdon Hills)
Party	Candidate	Votes	%
Conservative	Cullis	935	56.0
Labour	Forster	735	44.0
Majority		200	12.0
Turnout		1,670	21.7
Registered electors		7,703	
Conservative win			

=== Basildon (Pitsea) ===
Basildon (Pitsea)
Party	Candidate	Votes	%
Labour	John Elderton	746	54.6
Conservative	Thorpe	620	45.4
Majority		126	9.2
Turnout		1,366	18.6
Registered electors		7,354	
Labour win			

=== Basildon (Ramsden) ===
Basildon (Ramsden)
Party	Candidate	Votes	%
Conservative	William Redbond	1,281	69.7
Labour	Burnett	558	30.3
Majority		723	39.4
Turnout		1,839	23.7
Registered electors		7,766	
Conservative win			

=== Basildon (Wickford) ===
Basildon (Wickford)
Party	Candidate	Votes	%
Conservative	Fred Hodgson	1,651	61.3
Labour	Walsh	1,043	38.7
Majority		608	22.6
Turnout		2,694	27.3
Registered electors		9,883	
Conservative win			

=== Benfleet (East) ===
Benfleet (East)
Party	Candidate	Votes	%
Conservative	Jeffrey Daniels	2,174	67.7
Labour	Evans	1,039	32.3
Majority		1,135	35.4
Turnout		3,213	26.2
Registered electors		12,249	
Conservative win			

=== Benfleet (West) ===
Benfleet (West)
Party	Candidate	Votes	%
Conservative	Walter Marrison	2,158	59.3
Labour	Herington	1,484	40.7
Majority		674	18.6
Turnout		3,642	22.8
Registered electors		16,010	
Conservative win			

=== Braintree & Bocking ===
Braintree & Bocking
Party	Candidate	Votes	%
Labour	Tabor	2,574	56.2
Conservative	Ralph Batey	2,008	43.8
Majority		566	12.4
Turnout		4,582	32.3
Registered electors		14,169	
Labour win			

=== Brentwood (Central) ===
Brentwood (Central)
Party	Candidate	Votes	%
Conservative	Isgrove	1,543	77.8
Labour	Morgan	441	22.2
Majority		1,984	55.6
Turnout		1,984	25.2
Registered electors		7,859	
Conservative win			

=== Brentwood (Hutton) ===
Brentwood (Hutton)
Party	Candidate	Votes	%
Conservative	John Crofton	1,884	51.5
Liberal	Wernick	935	25.5
Labour	O'Brien	842	23.0
Majority		949	26.0
Turnout		3,661	37.9
Registered electors		9,649	
Conservative win			

=== Brentwood (North) ===
Brentwood (North)
Party	Candidate	Votes	%
Conservative	Davidson	1,527	62.3
Liberal	Neal	567	23.1
Labour	Rowe	357	14.6
Majority		960	39.2
Turnout		2,451	31.6
Registered electors		7,766	
Conservative win			

=== Brentwood (South) ===
Brentwood (South)
Party	Candidate	Votes	%
Conservative	Ernest Sole	1,974	54.1
Labour	Horovitch	1,675	45.9
Majority		299	8.2
Turnout		3,649	40.7
Registered electors		8,969	
Conservative win			

=== Brightlingsea ===
Brightlingsea
Party	Candidate	Votes	%
Liberal	Thomas Dale	832	35.9
Conservative	Gooch	777	33.5
Labour	French	711	30.6
Majority		55	2.4
Turnout		2,320	30.5
Registered electors		7,598	
Liberal win			

=== Broomfield ===
Broomfield
Party	Candidate	Votes	%
Conservative	Robert Eden	Unopposed	
Registered electors		6,858	
Conservative win			

=== Canvey Island ===
Canvey Island
Party	Candidate	Votes	%
Labour	Arthur Mason	1,748	64.5
Conservative	Smith	962	35.5
Majority		786	29.0
Turnout		2,710	19.6
Registered electors		13,797	
Labour win			

=== Chelmsford (East) ===
Chelmsford (East)
Party	Candidate	Votes	%
Conservative	Frederick Ward	1,010	64.0
Labour	Landers	568	36.0
Majority		442	28.0
Turnout		1,578	24.6
Registered electors		6,404	
Conservative win			

=== Chelmsford (North) ===
Chelmsford (North)
Party	Candidate	Votes	%
Labour	Henry Woodcraft	1,781	57.6
Conservative	King	1,309	42.4
Majority		472	15.2
Turnout		3,090	24.8
Registered electors		12,464	
Labour win			

=== Chelmsford (South) ===
Chelmsford (South)
Party	Candidate	Votes	%
Conservative	Evelyn Hockley	1,550	72.3
Labour	Baker	594	27.7
Majority		956	44.6
Turnout		2,144	23.1
Registered electors		9,276	
Conservative win			

=== Chelmsford (West) ===
Chelmsford (West)
Party	Candidate	Votes	%
Labour	Miriam Edwards	792	40.2
Conservative	Fuche	736	37.4
Independent	Verdult	440	22.4
Majority		56	2.8
Turnout		1,968	28.1
Registered electors		7,000	
Labour win			

=== Chigwell (Buckhurst Hill) ===
Chigwell (Buckhurst Hill)
Party	Candidate	Votes	%
Conservative	Ernest Perry	1,482	73.8
Labour	Hempstead	526	26.2
Majority		956	47.6
Turnout		2,008	24.2
Registered electors		8,294	
Conservative win			

=== Chigwell (Chigwell) ===
Chigwell (Chigwell)
Party	Candidate	Votes	%
Conservative	Leslie Wilson	967	87.6
Labour	Palfreman	137	12.4
Majority		830	75.2
Turnout		1,104	17.9
Registered electors		6,175	
Conservative win			

=== Chigwell (Loughton North) ===
Chigwell (Loughton North)
Party	Candidate	Votes	%
Labour	Frank Davis	1,486	54.5
Conservative	L. Davis	1,242	45.5
Majority		244	9.0
Turnout		2,728	26.0
Registered electors		10,509	
Labour win			

=== Chigwell (Loughton South) ===
Chigwell (Loughton South)
Party	Candidate	Votes	%
Conservative	Norman Crafford	1,862	57.8
Labour	William Archer	1,288	40.0
Communist	Hinchliff	69	2.1
Majority		574	17.8
Turnout		3,219	28.6
Registered electors		11,257	
Conservative win			

=== Clacton (North East) ===
Clacton (North East)
Party	Candidate	Votes	%
Conservative	Daphne Nicolls	1,647	84.3
Labour	White	306	15.7
Majority		1,341	68.6
Turnout		1,953	16.5
Registered electors		11,866	
Conservative win			

=== Clacton (South West) ===
Clacton (South West)
Party	Candidate	Votes	%
Conservative	Hyde	1,913	82.7
Labour	Madden	400	17.3
Majority		1,513	65.4
Turnout		2,313	17.4
Registered electors		13,325	
Conservative win			

=== Coggeshall ===
Coggeshall
Party	Candidate	Votes	%
Conservative	Robert Dixon Smith	1,963	54.7
Labour	Christopher Walker	1,626	45.3
Majority		337	9.4
Turnout		3,589	44.8
Registered electors		8,005	
Conservative win			

=== Colchester (Central) ===
Colchester (Central)
Party	Candidate	Votes	%
Labour	Frederick Parsley	1,215	54.7
Conservative	Odling	1,007	45.3
Majority		208	9.4
Turnout		2,222	33.7
Registered electors		6,589	
Labour win			

=== Colchester (East) ===
Colchester (East)
Party	Candidate	Votes	%
Labour	Eileen Komlosy	Unopposed	
Registered electors		8,568	
Labour win			

=== Colchester (North) ===
Colchester (North)
Party	Candidate	Votes	%
Conservative	Underwood	1,424	54.1
Labour	Ladbrook	1,210	45.9
Majority		214	8.2
Turnout		2,634	30.2
Registered electors		8,728	
Conservative win			

=== Colchester (South) ===
Colchester (South)
Party	Candidate	Votes	%
Labour	Ivor Brown	Unopposed	
Registered electors		9,061	
Labour win			

=== Colchester (West) ===
Colchester (West)
Party	Candidate	Votes	%
Conservative	Sir John Greaves	Unopposed	
Registered electors		9,061	
Conservative win			

=== Danbury ===
Danbury
Party	Candidate	Votes	%
Conservative	Reed	1,384	68.8
Labour	Davida Higgin	628	31.2
Majority		756	37.6
Turnout		2,012	29.4
Registered electors		6,834	
Conservative win			

=== Dedham & Stanway ===
Dedham & Stanway
Party	Candidate	Votes	%
Conservative	Gerald Milsom	Unopposed	
Registered electors		10,524	
Conservative win			

=== Dunmow ===
Dunmow
Party	Candidate	Votes	%
Conservative	Margaret Davey	2,013	75.6
Labour	Lynch	651	24.4
Majority		1,362	51.2
Turnout		2,664	35.0
Registered electors		7,623	
Conservative win			

=== Epping ===
Epping
Party	Candidate	Votes	%
Conservative	George Padfield	1,379	53.7
Labour	Christopher Morris	811	31.6
Liberal	Grant	379	14.8
Majority		568	22.1
Turnout		2,569	38.4
Registered electors		6,693	
Conservative win			

=== Epping Upland ===
Epping Upland
Party	Candidate	Votes	%
Conservative	Robert Daniels	1,549	67.2
Labour	Jones	756	32.8
Majority		793	34.4
Turnout		2,305	29.8
Registered electors		7,739	
Conservative win			

=== Frinton & Walton ===
Frinton & Walton
Party	Candidate	Votes	%
Conservative	Margaret Gray	1,939	59.6
Liberal	Rayner	947	29.1
Labour	Phillips	369	11.3
Majority		992	30.5
Turnout		3,255	36.5
Registered electors		8,922	
Conservative win			

=== Great Baddow ===
Great Baddow
Party	Candidate	Votes	%
Conservative	John Foxon	1,773	63.4
Labour	Hempstead	1,025	36.6
Majority		748	26.8
Turnout		2,798	31.3
Registered electors		8,939	
Conservative win			

=== Halstead ===
Halstead
Party	Candidate	Votes	%
Conservative	Geoffrey Waterer	2,745	56.3
Labour	Dixey	2,128	43.7
Majority		617	12.6
Turnout		4,873	53.9
Registered electors		9,037	
Conservative win			

=== Harlow (Harlow & Mark Hall) ===
Harlow (Harlow & Mark Hall)
Party	Candidate	Votes	%
Labour	Anderson	1,568	75.9
Liberal	Preece	499	24.1
Majority		1,069	51.8
Turnout		2,067	23.3
Registered electors		8,891	
Labour win			

=== Harlow (Netteswell & Little Parndon) ===
Harlow (Netteswell & Little Parndon)
Party	Candidate	Votes	%
Labour	Sonia Anderson	1,447	75.8
Liberal	Jackson	463	24.2
Majority		984	51.6
Turnout		1,910	22.3
Registered electors		8,571	
Labour win			

=== Harlow (Potter Street & Brays Grove) ===
Harlow (Potter Street & Brays Grove)
Party	Candidate	Votes	%
Labour	Lehane	738	84.8
Liberal	Jackson	132	15.2
Majority		606	69.6
Turnout		870	15.2
Registered electors		5,709	
Labour win			

=== Harlow (Town Centre & Great Parndon) ===
Harlow (Town Centre & Great Parndon)
Party	Candidate	Votes	%
Labour	Howett	1,232	61.5
Conservative	Carson	592	29.6
Liberal	Perry	179	8.9
Majority		640	31.9
Turnout		2,003	32.2
Registered electors		6,213	
Labour win			

=== Harlow (Tye Green & Latton Bush) ===
Harlow (Tye Green & Latton Bush)
Party	Candidate	Votes	%
Labour	Karger	1,248	77.7
Liberal	Green	358	22.3
Majority		890	55.4
Turnout		1,606	23.7
Registered electors		6,766	
Labour win			

=== Harwich ===
Harwich
Party	Candidate	Votes	%
Labour	Harry Gochin	1,240	46.2
Independent	Burtsal	1,040	38.7
Independent	Rose	404	15.1
Majority		200	7.5
Turnout		2,684	28.0
Registered electors		9,578	
Labour win			

=== Hedingham ===
Hedingham
Party	Candidate	Votes	%
Labour	Dorothy Stieber	2,301	52.7
Conservative	Warren	2,063	47.3
Majority		236	5.4
Turnout		4,364	55.5
Registered electors		7,862	
Labour win			

=== Hockley & Rawreth ===
Hockley & Rawreth
Party	Candidate	Votes	%
Conservative	William Wright	1,411	68.5
Labour	Lambe	649	31.5
Majority		762	37.0
Turnout		2,060	20.6
Registered electors		9,984	
Conservative win			

=== Maldon ===
Maldon
Party	Candidate	Votes	%
Conservative	James Brown	1,725	52.1
Labour	Brewster	1,584	47.9
Majority		141	4.2
Turnout		3,309	40.8
Registered electors		8,106	
Conservative win			

=== Mersea ===
Mersea
Party	Candidate	Votes	%
Conservative	Raymond Bunn	2,178	68.8
Labour	Edward Lilley	990	31.3
Majority		1,188	37.5
Turnout		3,168	28.0
Registered electors		11,330	
Conservative win			

=== Ongar ===
Ongar
Party	Candidate	Votes	%
Conservative	Ernest Cooke	2,163	68.1
Labour	Hammond	1,014	31.9
Majority		1,149	36.2
Turnout		3,177	35.6
Registered electors		8,934	
Conservative win			

=== Southminster ===
Southminster
Party	Candidate	Votes	%
Conservative	Watts	1,647	64.9
Labour	Harris	641	25.2
Liberal	Barlow	251	9.9
Majority		1,006	39.7
Turnout		2,539	31.0
Registered electors		8,181	
Conservative win			

=== Stansted ===
Stansted
Party	Candidate	Votes	%
Conservative	Robert Dyball	2,208	63.6
Labour	Wilson	1,263	36.4
Majority		945	27.2
Turnout		3,471	41.5
Registered electors		8,375	
Conservative win			

=== Stock ===
Stock
Party	Candidate	Votes	%
Conservative	Robert Foulsham	1,156	77.6
Labour	Guilder	333	22.4
Majority		1,489	55.2
Turnout		1,489	23.0
Registered electors		6,479	
Conservative win			

=== Tendring ===
Tendring
Party	Candidate	Votes	%
Conservative	Fred Aylmore	1,119	52.7
Labour	Ann Hoskyna	1,004	47.3
Majority		115	5.4
Turnout		2,123	25.0
Registered electors		8,495	
Conservative win			

=== Thaxted ===
Thaxted
Party	Candidate	Votes	%
Conservative	Gerald Curtis	1,552	53.1
Labour	Peter Harrison	1,372	46.9
Majority		180	6.2
Turnout		2,924	40.9
Registered electors		7,147	
Conservative win			

=== Theydon ===
Theydon
Party	Candidate	Votes	%
Conservative	David Jones	2,137	55.5
Liberal	Logan	936	24.3
Labour	Gerrard	777	20.2
Majority		1,201	31.2
Turnout		3,850	41.1
Registered electors		9,369	
Conservative win			

=== Thurrock (Chadwell) ===
Thurrock (Chadwell)
Party	Candidate	Votes	%
Labour	Arthur Siddons	552	79.5
Liberal	Sidney Senior	142	20.5
Majority		410	59.0
Turnout		694	10.8
Registered electors		6,446	
Labour win			

=== Thurrock (Grays Thurrock) ===
Thurrock (Grays Thurrock)
Party	Candidate	Votes	%
Labour	Harold Fletcher	1,080	60.0
Conservative	Bright	616	34.2
Liberal	Catty	104	5.8
Majority		464	25.8
Turnout		1,800	17.2
Registered electors		10,443	
Labour win			

=== Thurrock (Little Thurrock) ===
Thurrock (Little Thurrock)
Party	Candidate	Votes	%
Labour	Roy Robertson	792	50.3
Conservative	Robinson	782	47.7
Majority		10	0.6
Turnout		1,574	23.5
Registered electors		6,691	
Labour win			

=== Thurrock (Orsett & Stifford) ===
Thurrock (Orsett & Stifford)
Party	Candidate	Votes	%
Labour	John Pollard	1,080	52.0
Conservative	Price	730	35.1
Liberal	Ronald Knight	267	12.9
Majority		350	16.9
Turnout		2,077	24.8
Registered electors		8,365	
Labour win			

=== Thurrock (South Ockendon) ===
Thurrock (South Ockendon)
Party	Candidate	Votes	%
Labour	Wootton	984	85.6
Liberal	Bowles	165	14.4
Majority		819	71.2
Turnout		1,149	10.0
Registered electors		11,459	
Labour win			

=== Thurrock (Stanford-le-Hope & Corringham) ===
Thurrock (Stanford-le-Hope & Corringham)
Party	Candidate	Votes	%
Labour	Julian Norris	1,691	59.0
Conservative	Hart	1,064	37.1
Liberal	Sargeant	113	3.9
Majority		627	21.9
Turnout		2,868	21.9
Registered electors		13,092	
Labour win			

=== Thurrock (Tilbury) ===
Thurrock (Tilbury)
Party	Candidate	Votes	%
Labour	Albert Jones	564	95.6
Liberal	Percy Goodyear	26	4.4
Majority		538	91.2
Turnout		590	9.9
Registered electors		5,963	
Labour win			

=== Thurrock (West Thurrock & Aveley) ===
Thurrock (West Thurrock & Aveley)
Party	Candidate	Votes	%
Labour	Ridgwell	620	83.8
Liberal	Beadle	120	16.2
Majority		500	67.6
Turnout		740	7.9
Registered electors		9,369	
Labour win			

=== Tollesbury ===
Tollesbury
Party	Candidate	Votes	%
Conservative	William Gimson	1,843	60.9
Liberal	White	644	21.3
Labour	Lane	538	17.8
Majority		1,199	39.6
Turnout		3,025	39.6
Registered electors		7,637	
Conservative win			

=== Waltham Abbey ===
Waltham Abbey
Party	Candidate	Votes	%
Conservative	Ellen Tuck	1,741	55.8
Labour	Allen	1,378	44.2
Majority		363	11.6
Turnout		3,119	39.8
Registered electors		7,828	
Conservative win			

=== Witham ===
Witham
Party	Candidate	Votes	%
Labour	Thomas Mott	1,666	55.4
Conservative	Elizabeth Clarke	1,339	44.6
Majority		327	10.8
Turnout		3,005	43.2
Registered electors		6,960	
Labour win			

=== Wivenhoe ===
Wivenhoe
Party	Candidate	Votes	%
Labour	Derek Crosfield	1,138	41.9
Conservative	Hunneyball	1,118	41.1
Liberal	Fitch	463	17.0
Majority		20	0.8
Turnout		2,719	31.3
Registered electors		8,684	
Labour win			

=== Writtle ===
Writtle
Party	Candidate	Votes	%
Conservative	Beryl Platt	Unopposed	
Registered electors		7,445	
Conservative win			
