= 1965 Edinburgh Corporation election =

Local election in Scotland

- 4 May 1965

23 of the 69 seats to the Edinburgh Corporation 35 seats needed for a majority
	First party	Second party	Third party
Party	Progressives	Labour	Liberal
Last election	33	32	4
Seats before	34	32	3
Seats won	13	9	1
Seats after	35	32	2
Seat change	▲2	Steady	▼2
Popular vote	55,018	31,214	13,030
Percentage	57.5%	27.9%	12.9%
- Results by ward.
Council control before election
No overall control
Council control after election
Progressives

An election to the Edinburgh Corporation was held on 4 May 1965, alongside municipal elections across Scotland. Of the councils 69 seats, 23 were up for election.

After the election Edinburgh Corporation was composed of 35 Progressives, 33 Labour councillors, and 2 Liberal. The Progressives gained control of the council, which had previously been under no overall control.

== Aggregate results ==
Edinburgh Corporation election, 1965
Party	Seats	Gains	Losses	Net gain/loss	Seats %	Votes %	Votes	+/−
Progressives	13	1	0	▲1	56.5	57.5	55,018	
Labour	9	0	0	Steady	39.1	27.9	31,214	
Liberal	0	0	1	▼1	4.3	12.9	13,030	
Communist	0	0	0	Steady	0.0	1.0	1,025	
SNP	0	0	0	Steady	0.0	0.7	677	

== Ward results ==
Location of Broughton ward

Broughton
Party	Candidate	Votes	%
Progressives	Gottleb A. Theurer	2,718	
Liberal	Violet MacInnes	1,590	
Majority		1,128	
Turnout			33.82
Progressives hold			

Location of Calton ward

Calton
Party	Candidate	Votes	%
Labour	James S. Cook	2,393	
Progressives	Victor J. Symes	2,241	
Majority		152	
Turnout			41.15
Labour hold			

Location of Central Leith ward

Central Leith
Party	Candidate	Votes	%
Labour	Ewen G. Bethuse	2,391	
Communist	Theodore C. Taylor	157	
Majority		2,234	
Turnout			22.21
Labour hold			

Location of Colinton ward

Colinton
Party	Candidate	Votes	%
Progressives	Herbert A. Brechin	4,655	
Labour	Robert W. Irvine	2,707	
Majority		1,948	
Turnout		7,362	40.97
Progressives hold			

Location of Corstorphine ward

Corstorphine
Party	Candidate	Votes	%
Progressives	Fred Ford	3,979	
Liberal	Thomas M. Frew	3,158	
Majority		821	
Turnout			43.1
Progressives hold			

Location of Craigentinny ward

Craigentinny
Party	Candidate	Votes	%
Labour	George Drummond	3,171	
Progressives	Douglas B. Harvey	2,178	
Majority		993	
Turnout			36.18
Labour hold			

Location of Craigmillar ward

Craigmillar
Party	Candidate	Votes	%
Labour	Donald F. Remon	1,813	
Communist	Michael D'Arcy	175	
Majority		1,638	
Turnout			19.67
Labour hold			

Location of George Square ward

George Square
Party	Candidate	Votes	%
Progressives	William Simpson-Bell	2,303	
Liberal	Kenneth D. A. Johnston	1,123	
Majority		1,171	
Turnout			32.01
Progressives hold			

Location of Gorgie-Dalry ward

Gorgie-Dalry
Party	Candidate	Votes	%
Progressives	Florence A. R. Strachan	2,355	
Liberal	George F. Smith	1,195	
Communist	Charles Cumming	275	
Majority		1,160	
Turnout			27.27
Progressives hold			

Location of Holyrood ward

Holyrood
Party	Candidate	Votes	%
Labour	Norman F. McQueen	1,414	
Communist	John Ashton	159	
Majority		1,255	
Turnout			18.68
Labour hold			

Location of Liberton ward

Liberton
Party	Candidate	Votes	%
Labour	Murdo R. M. Mackenzie	Unopposed	
Labour hold			

Location of Merchiston ward

Merchiston
Party	Candidate	Votes	%
Liberal	Robert L. Smith	2,696	
Progressives	Clive F. Murphy	2,422	
Labour	Sylvia D. Renilson	845	
Majority		274	
Turnout			51.99
Liberal hold			

Location of Morningside ward

Morningside
Party	Candidate	Votes	%
Progressives	John Fitzpatrick	4,217	
SNP	Harrison M. Robertson	677	
Majority		3,540	
Turnout			36.73
Progressives hold			

Location of Murrayfield-Cramond ward

Murrayfield-Cramond
Party	Candidate	Votes	%
Progressives	Robert M. Knox	5,334	
Labour	James H, Renilson	1,936	
Liberal	Marion M. Ritchie	901	
Majority		3,398	
Turnout			43.76
Progressives hold			

Location of Newington ward

Newington
Party	Candidate	Votes	%
Progressives	Eric M. Kean	4,134	
Liberal	Margaret J, Workman	2,367	
Labour	Eva Gibbons	1,169	
Majority		1,767	
Turnout			46.94
Progressives gain from Liberal			

Location of Pilton ward

Pilton
Party	Candidate	Votes	%
Labour	Catherina T. Nealon	3,010	
Communist	Charles McManus	259	
Majority		2,751	
Turnout			18.62
Labour hold			

Location of Portobello ward

Portobello
Party	Candidate	Votes	%
Progressives	Alfred W. Hunt	5,119	
Labour	Phyllis Herriot	3,437	
Majority		1,682	
Turnout			47.51
Progressives hold			

Location of Sighthill ward

Sighthill
Party	Candidate	Votes	%
Labour	James Ross	Unopposed	
Labour hold			

Location of South Leith

South Leith
Party	Candidate	Votes	%
Labour	Walter S. Dalgleish	2,941	
Progressives	Thomas S. Ramage	2,780	
Majority		161	
Turnout			42.34
Labour hold			

Location of St Andrews ward

St. Andrews
Party	Candidate	Votes	%
Progressives	Lawrence S. Miller	2,857	
Labour	Christina S. Guest	704	
Majority		1,353	
Turnout			27.00
Progressives hold			

Location of St Bernards ward

St. Bernards
Party	Candidate	Votes	%
Progressives	Winifred E. Donaldson	4,258	
Labour	David Millar	1,527	
Majority		2,731	
Turnout			32.80
Progressives hold			

Location of St Giles ward

St. Giles
Party	Candidate	Votes	%
Labour	Margaret B. Smith	Unopposed	
Labour hold			

Location of West Leith ward

West Leith
Party	Candidate	Votes	%
Progressives	John Scott	3,468	
Labour	Shelia K. Murray	1,756	
Majority		1,712	
Turnout			44.32
Progressives hold			
