= Julian and Sandy =

Camp characters in the BBC Radio show "Round the Horne"

1976 LP cover

Julian and Sandy were characters in the BBC radio comedy programme Round the Horne from 1965 to 1968 and were played by Hugh Paddick and Kenneth Williams respectively, with scripts written by Barry Took and Marty Feldman. The characters were named after the writers Sandy Wilson and Julian Slade.

Although no longer referred to as such, the various characters played by Williams and Paddick in a section of Stop Messing About were in all but name Julian and Sandy.

== Background ==
Barry Took describes the original conception of Julian and Sandy as two "old theatrical chaps" who were doing housework in the flat of Kenneth Horne (the "straight man" in the sketches), while waiting for their next acting job. However, the producer of Round the Horne, John Simmonds, did not like them and viewed the characters as "too sad" and suggested making them younger "chorus boy" types. Their first appearance was in episode four of the first series, and – although Marty Feldman apparently "got tired of them" – Julian and Sandy proved to be the most successful part of the show, and appeared in every episode thereafter.

As well as being a successful comedy act, Julian and Sandy were notable for being two stereotypical camp homosexual characters in mainstream entertainment at a time when homosexual acts between men were illegal in the United Kingdom. (Note: Homosexual acts were partially decriminalised in England and Wales in 1967.) The writers and cast thought the characters worked very well as they were not simply there to be the target of a joke: in fact most of the sketches revolved around Kenneth Horne's presumed ignorance being the target of their jokes. Paul Baker writes that these sketches, while mocking an oppressed gay identity, present gay people as cheerful, rather than "indexing unhappy, ashamed identities like those in films such as Victim (1961), A Taste of Honey (1961) and The Boys in the Band (1970), or the openly politicised identity adopted by members of the Gay Liberation Front".

Their use of Polari in sketches introduced the gay cant to a mass audience, and identified them as gay to those in the know. Some terms eluded censorship. "I met him in a cottage" was completely lost on the BBC, while the gay community knew it meant a public lavatory. Although such use prompted a brief revival, the familiarity spread by Round the Horne ultimately led to Polari's near-demise as a means of communication between gay men. On the other hand, as in the case of Cockney rhyming slang, some words became common language.

Horne would start off usually by mentioning that he had found an advertisement in one of a selection of risqué magazines, which he would insist he bought for innocent reasons. This would lead him, more often than not, to a business in Chelsea starting with the word "Bona" (Polari for "good"). He would enter by saying, "Hello, anybody there?", and Julian (Hugh Paddick) would answer, to a round of applause from the studio audience, "Ooh hello! I'm Julian and this is my friend Sandy!" – only once, on their second appearance, does Sandy start by introducing his friend Julian.

This quote illustrating the use of double entendre is from the sketch "Bona Law" (itself a pun on the name of Bonar Law, a former prime minister of the United Kingdom), featuring Julian and Sandy as lawyers:

HORNE: Will you take my case?
JULIAN: Well, it depends on what it is. We've got a criminal practice that takes up most of our time.
HORNE: Yes, but apart from that, I need legal advice.
SANDY: Ooh, isn't he bold?

Here, the "criminal practice" refers to both the fact that Julian is a "practising homosexual" and also the law practice where he is currently employed. Such innuendo and double entendre was the predominant form of British humour at the time, with the Carry On films – in which Kenneth Williams featured prominently – being an iconic example of such.

At other times, Horne's character would pretend not to understand the more risqué meanings in Julian and Sandy's dialogue, although it was always hinted that he was secretly in on the joke. A good example was Horne attempting to use Polari himself:

HORNE: Would I have vada'd any of them do you think?
SANDY: Oooh! He's got all the Polari, ain't he?
JULIAN: Hmmmm, I wonder where he picks it up?

The sketches also often had Horne drawing out more about Julian and Sandy's personal lives than he intended, as the two would misunderstand his meaning. In one sketch, discussing Julian and Sandy's time out travelling the world aboard ship, Sandy reveals Julian was swept overboard in a storm:

HORNE: But did you manage to drag yourself up on deck?
JULIAN: Ooh, no, we dressed quite casual....

A recurring comedic theme of the series was Sandy (Williams) archly disclosing, or drawing out, a hinted-at salacious detail from Julian's (Paddick) past. Apparently Julian had had an "experience up the Acropolis" and a tale about "Bognor" had apparently been divulged by Julian after he had "been at the gin". There would then always be an anguished complaint from Julian of "You traitor – you swore you'd never tell!", before Sandy would prompt him to explain all by imploring him to "Go on – purge yourself!" On a rare occasion Julian turned the tables on Sandy, and after bellowing the "purge yourself!" line, he then ad-libbed "I've been dying to say that for years!"

Ad-libs were a prominent part of the sketch (although on the show That Reminds Me, Barry Took denied this, saying that most of what seemed to be ad lib was scripted), and were one of the reasons for how well the humour worked, as both Paddick and Williams were accomplished and very familiar with Polari in real-life conversation. Williams, in particular, would add many lines of his own ("Lau your luppers on the strillers bona" (play the piano) being his most extreme use of obscure Polari).

Another catchphrase often used by both characters was "That's your actual French", although Barry Took acknowledged that Peter Cook had claimed to be the first to use "your actual ...." as a format phrase.

The humour acquired a real edge with jokes that were both risqué and controversial. Lines such as the following were very daring for their period:

SANDY: Don't mention Málaga to Julian, he got very badly stung.
HORNE: Portuguese man o' war?
JULIAN: Well I never saw him in uniform...

In the last episode of Series 4 in 1968 (which turned out to be the last ever episode of the show, due to Horne's sudden death) Julian and Sandy are revealed, very incongruously, to be "married" to a pair of "dolly palones" named Julie and Sandra. Also, Julian's full name is revealed to be Julian Mungo Lestrange.

== Other appearances of the characters ==
On 30 December 1987, a special edition of Wogan called Radio Fun paid tribute to BBC radio comedy. Hugh Paddick and Kenneth Williams appeared as Julian and Sandy, with Terry Wogan doing Kenneth Horne's lines, as Horne had died in 1969. Williams himself died in April 1988.

In the stage show Round the Horne ... Revisited, which ran from 2003 to 2005 and was filmed for BBC Four, Paddick and Williams (and therefore Julian and Sandy) were played by Nigel Harrison and Robin Sebastian.

== Recordings ==
- The Bona World of Julian and Sandy (LP 1976; CD 2002)
- Julian and Sandy (CD 2006)

== See also ==
- Wolfenden report

== Bibliography ==
- Baker, Paul (2003). Polari - The Lost Language of Gay Men. Routledge. ISBN 9781134506354.
