= List of Donald Trump 2024 presidential campaign non-political endorsements =

This is a list of notable American non-officeholders who endorsed Donald Trump for the 2024 U.S. presidential election.

== Notable military personnel ==
=== Air Force ===
- John J. Closner III, retired major general in the Air Force
- James B. Davis, general
- Alfred G. Hansen, Air Force general
- Murray A. Hansen, Air Force general
- Timothy A. Kinnan, Air Force general
- John D. Logeman, Air Force general
- John N. Lotz, Air Force general
- Thomas McInerney, Air Force general
- Scott O'Grady, politician and former Air Force fighter pilot
- Raymund E. O'Mara, major general of the Air Force
- Lance L. Smith, Air Force general

=== Army ===
- Burwell B. Bell III, Army general
- David Bellavia, Army Medal of Honor recipient
- William G. Boykin, retired Army general and political official
- Patrick Henry Brady, Army general
- Sam Brown, politician and military veteran
- Sammy L. Davis, soldier
- Michael John Fitzmaurice, Army specialist 4, Medal of Honor & Purple Heart recipient
- Harold A. Fritz, Army Medal of Honor recipient
- Joe Kent, far-right political candidate and former army officer
- Peter C. Lemon, soldier
- Gary L. Littrell, Army Medal of Honor recipient
- James McCloughan, Army soldier
- William C. Moore, Army general
- James Mukoyama, Army general
- Robert Martin Patterson, Army Medal of Honor recipient
- Sergio de la Peña, politician & soldier
- Earl Plumlee, Army Master Sergeant and Medal of Honor recipient
- Clinton Romesha, Army Medal of Honor recipient
- Anthony Shaffer, Army officer
- Alek Skarlatos, former National Guard soldier and political candidate
- Perry G. Smith Sr., Army general
- James Allen Taylor, Army Medal of Honor recipient
- Paul E. Vallely, Army general
- Ronald L. Watts, Army general

=== Coast Guard ===
- Larry L. Hereth, rear admiral
- Richard D. Herr, retired vice admiral in the Coast Guard
- Howard Thorsen, Former vice admiral of the Coast Guard

=== Marine Corps ===
- Terrence R. Dake, Marine Corps general
- Timothy F. Ghormley, Marine Corps general
- James E. Livingston, Marine general and holder of the Medal of Honor
- Ronald G. Richard, Marine Corps general

=== Navy ===
- Edward Byers, Navy SEAL and Medal of Honor recipient
- Robert Conway, Navy admiral
- John G. Cotton, retired vice admiral in the Navy
- Robert G. Darling, board-certified emergency medicine physician in the White House Medical Unit
- Henry J. Hendrix, Navy captain
- James R. Hogg, admiral
- Jerome L. Johnson, retired four-star admiral of the Navy
- Richard B. Landolt, retired rear admiral of the Navy
- William J. Luti, Navy officer and
- Charles W. Moore Jr., Navy vice admiral
- Robert H. Shumaker, Navy rear admiral and Vietnam War POW
- Michael E. Thornton, Navy Medal of Honor recipient

== Business leaders ==
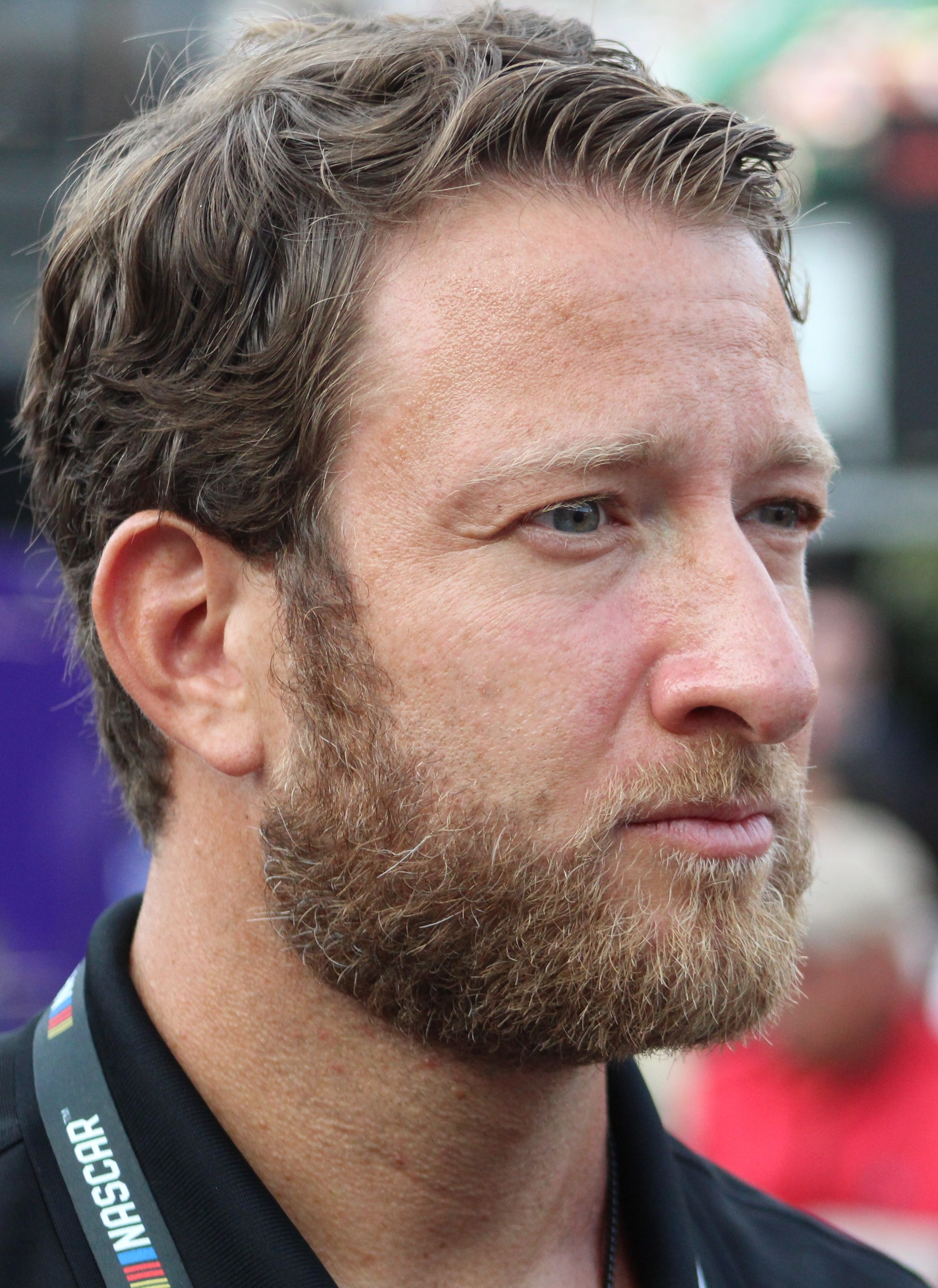
Dave Portnoy

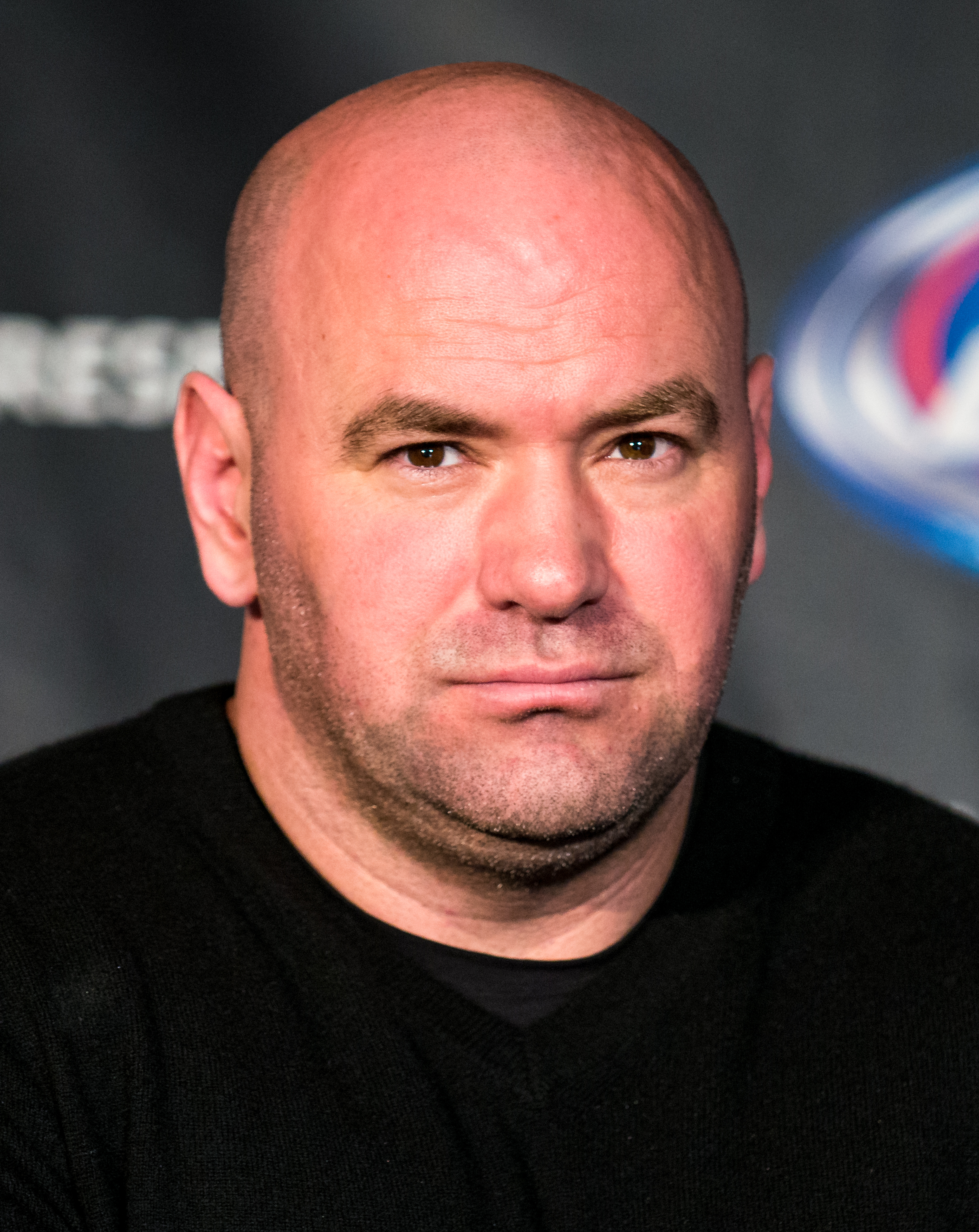
Dana White

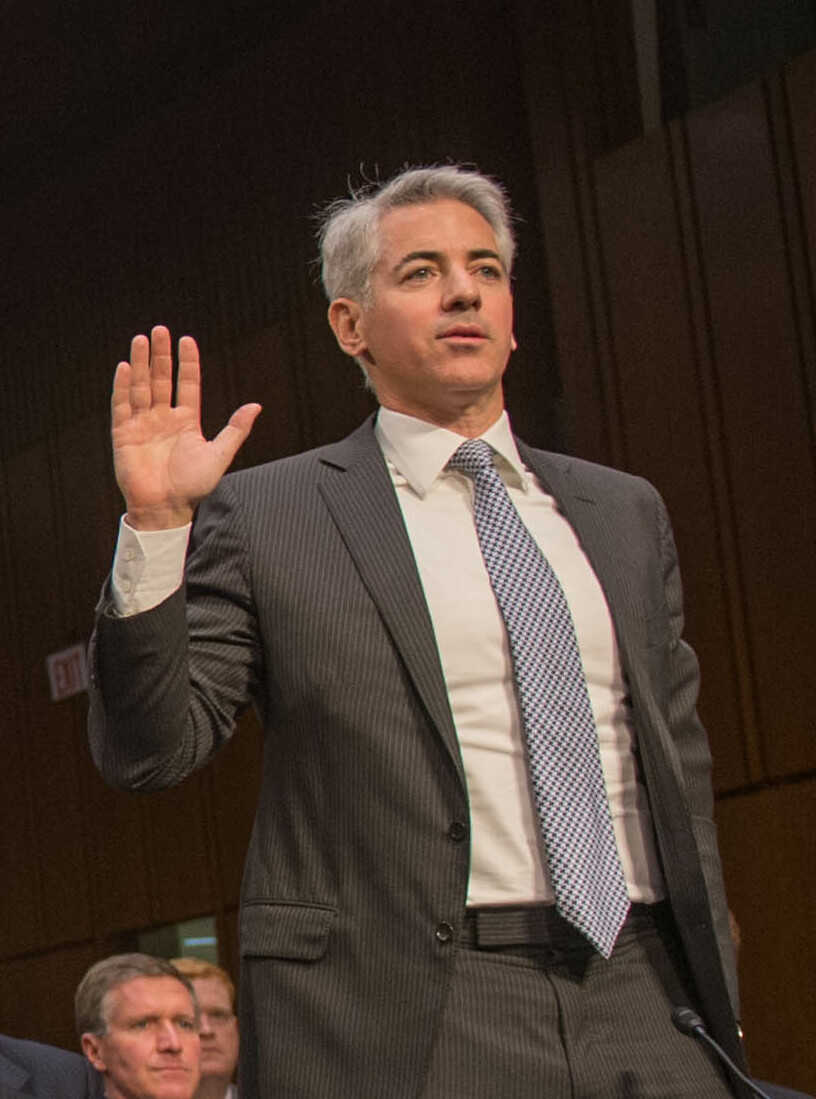
Bill Ackman

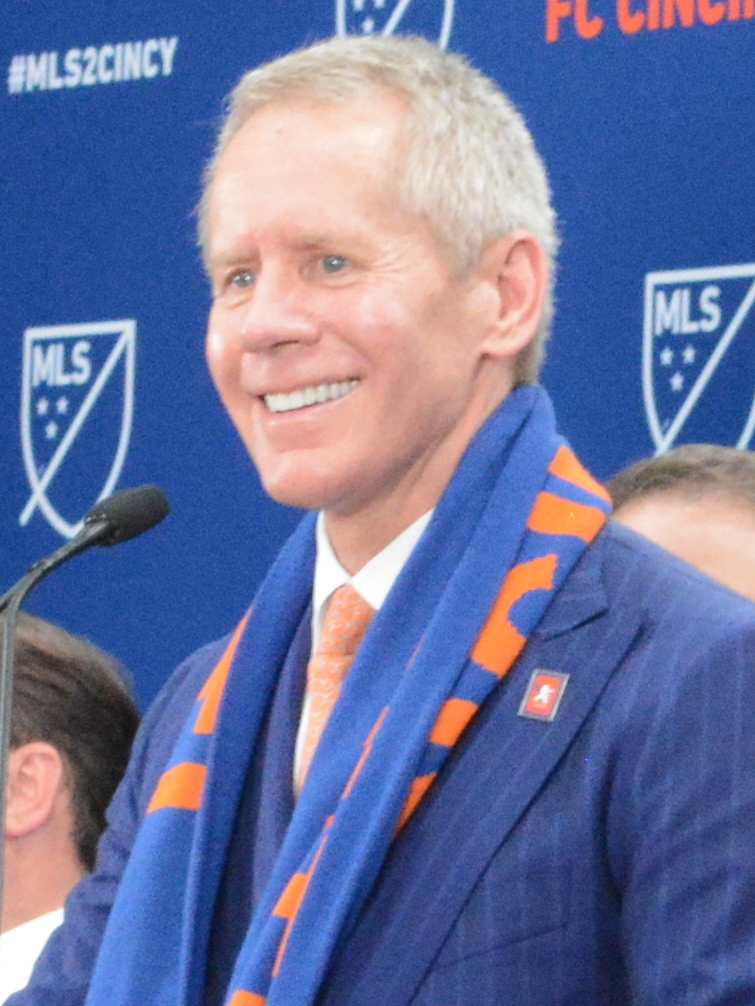
Carl Lindner III

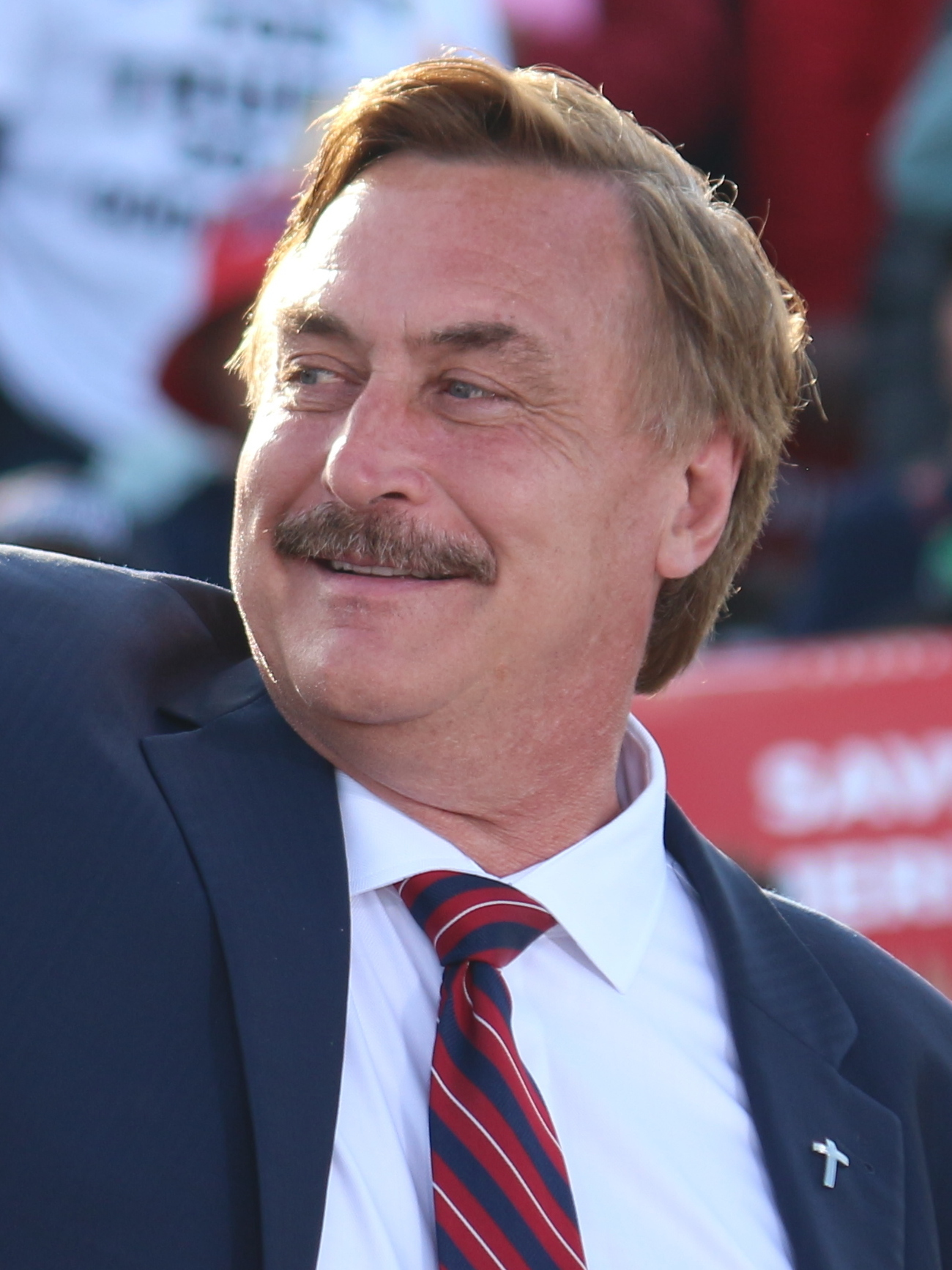
Mike Lindell

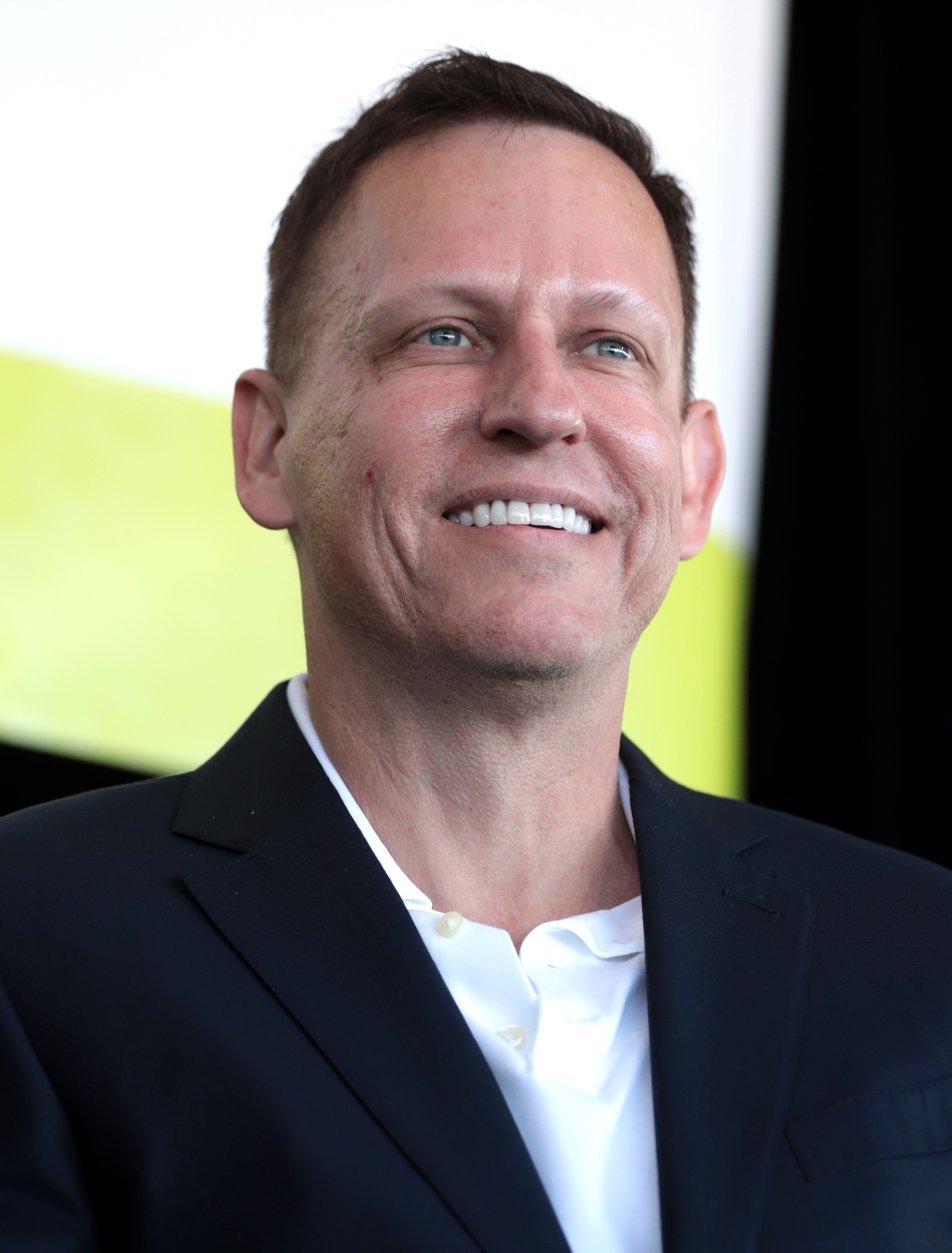
Peter Thiel

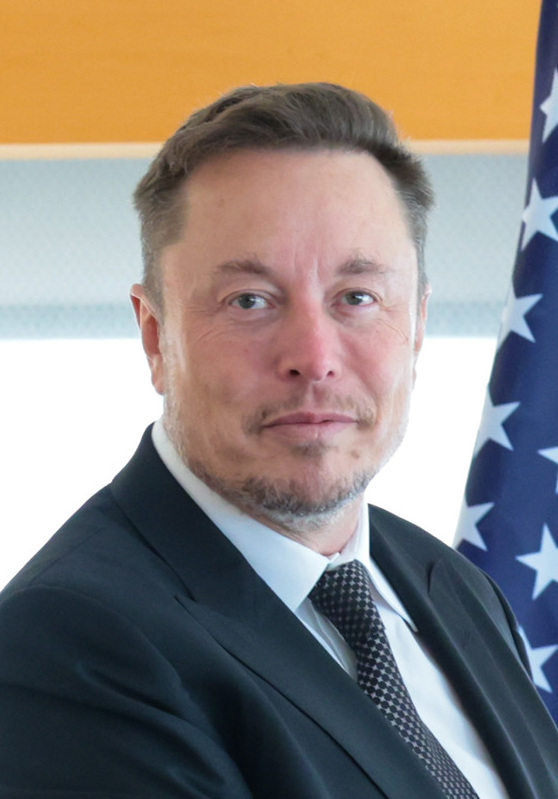
Elon Musk

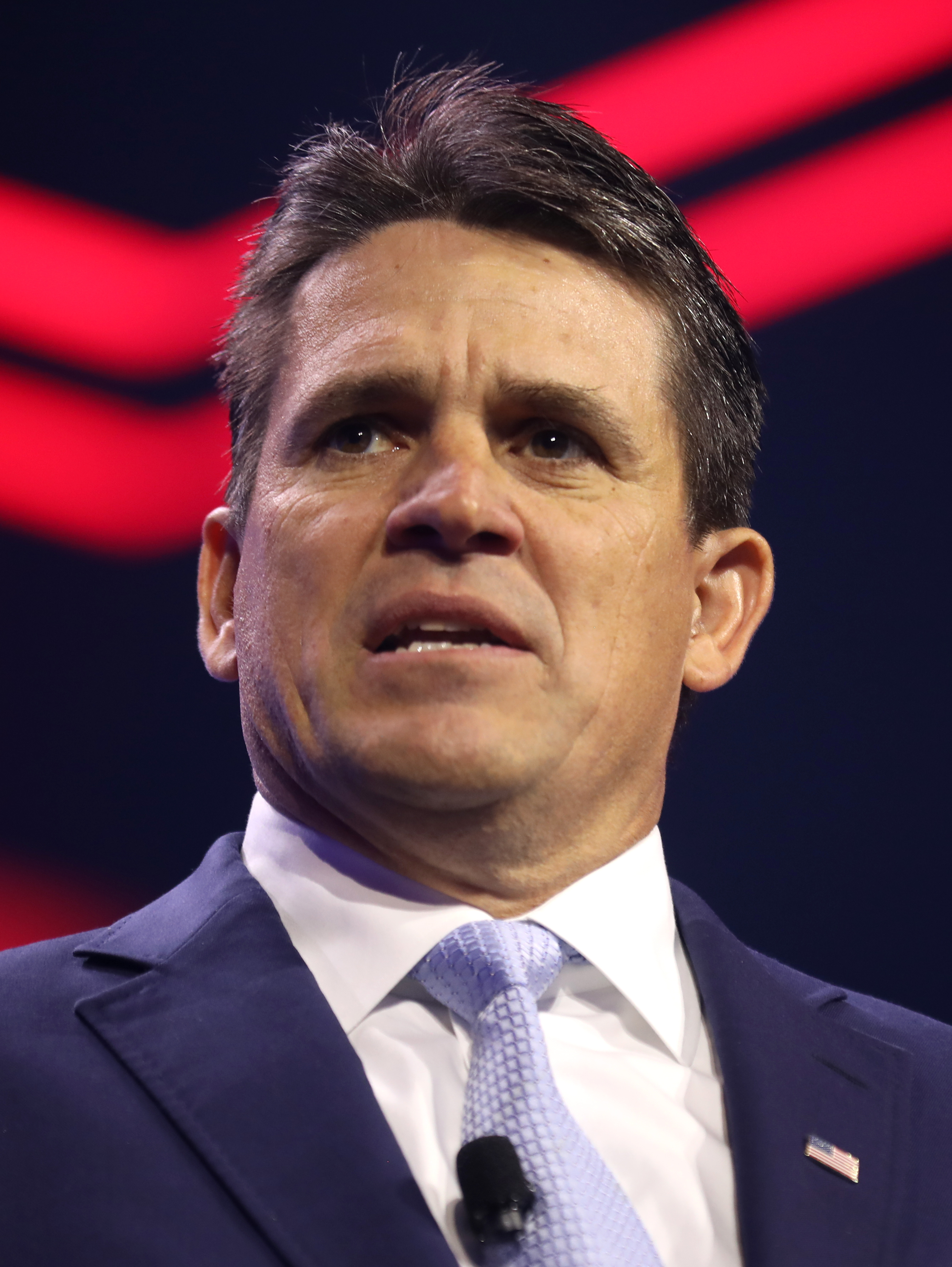
Ryan Binkley

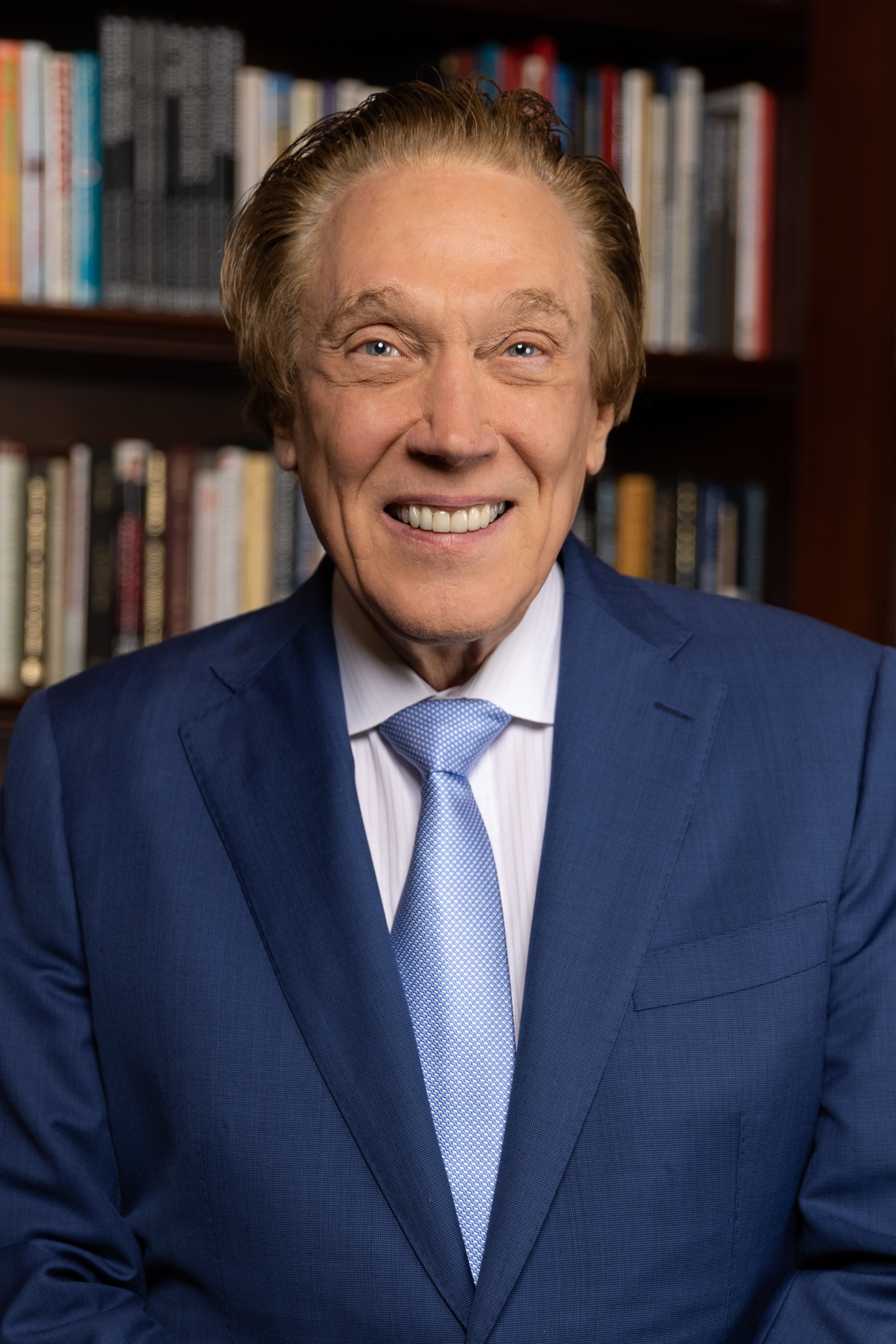
Perry Johnson

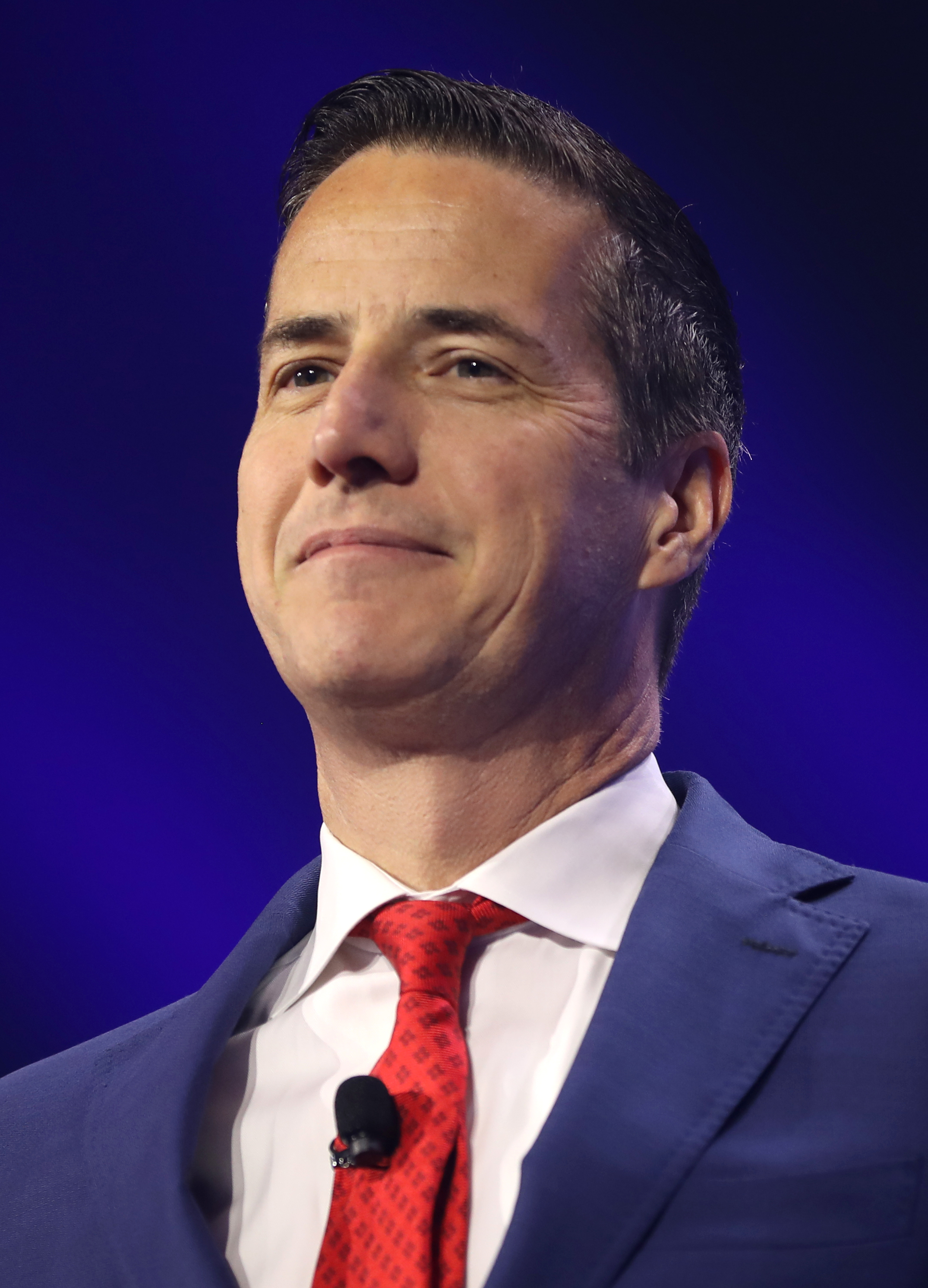
Bernie Moreno

=== Entertainment and hospitality ===
- Miriam Adelson, physician, billionaire, and conservative donor
- Joseph Cayre, businessman and real estate developer
- Paula Deen, cook, restaurateur, author, and television personality
- Tilman Fertitta, businessman
- Jay Kemmerer, businessman and philanthropist
- E. Javier Loya, businessman and CEO of OTC Global Holdings
- Billy McFarland, businessman and convicted fraudster
- Isaac Perlmutter, businessman
- Dave Portnoy, entrepreneur
- Phil Ruffin, businessman
- Dana White, businessman

=== Finance ===
- Bill Ackman, hedge fund manager
- Marc Andreessen, businessman
- Scott Bessent, investor, philanthropist and educator
- Michael Bickford, businessman
- Kenneth Fisher, investment adviser
- Bill Foley, businessperson
- William E. Ford, businessman
- Kenneth C. Griffin, hedge fund manager
- Charles Hoskinson, cryptocurrency investor
- Douglas Leone, venture capitalist
- Warren Lichtenstein, businessman
- Carl Lindner III, businessman
- Howard Lorber, businessman and investor
- Howard Lutnick, billionaire businessman
- David A. Marcus, entrepreneur
- Blake Masters, venture capitalist and author
- Rebekah Mercer, heiress and political donor
- Chamath Palihapitiya, businessman
- John Paulson, hedge fund manager
- Nelson Peltz, businessman
- Thomas Peterffy, businessman
- Keith Rabois, technology executive and investor
- Joe Ricketts, businessman
- David Sacks, entrepreneur
- Paul Singer, businessman
- Jeffrey Sprecher, businessman
- Warren Stephens, businessman
- Cameron Winklevoss, businessman and rower
- Tyler Winklevoss, businessman and rower
- Cathie Wood, investor and businesswoman

=== Petroleum and energy ===
- George Bishop, businessman
- Joe Craft, businessman
- Tim Dunn, businessman
- Dan K. Eberhart, businessman
- Harold Hamm, businessman
- Jeffery Hildebrand, billionaire businessman
- Vicki Hollub, businesswoman and mineral engineer
- Bryan Sheffield, businessman
- Scott D. Sheffield, business executive
- Kelcy Warren, businessman
- Chris Wright, CEO of Liberty Energy

=== Real estate ===
- Ben Ashkenazy, real estate developer
- Joseph C. Canizaro, businessman and philanthropist
- Larry Mizel, businessman
- Steve Witkoff, real estate investor and landlord

=== Retail ===
- Patrick M. Byrne, Former president, CEO and chairman of Overstock.com
- John Catsimatidis, magnate and political figure
- Rick Harrison, businessman and TV personality
- Ken Langone, businessman
- Mike Lindell, businessman
- Jim McIngvale, businessman

=== Technology ===
- Dylan Field, entrepreneur
- Larry Ellison, businessman
- Jeremy Kauffman, entrepreneur (Libertarian)
- Joe Lonsdale, entrepreneur and venture capitalist
- Palmer Luckey, entrepreneur
- Nate Morris, Entrepreneur
- Mark Pincus, Internet entrepreneur
- Naval Ravikant, entrepreneur and investor
- Robert J. Shillman, businessman
- Thomas Siebel, businessman
- Peter Thiel, entrepreneur and venture capitalist
- Kenny Troutt, businessman
- Jeff Yass, businessman (Libertarian)

=== Transportation ===
- Robert Bigelow, businessman
- Timothy Mellon, businessman
- Elon Musk, businessman (Independent)
- Shervin Pishevar, entrepreneur and investor
- Tim Sheehy, businessman and political candidate

=== Other ===
- Mark Albrecht, executive
- Tim Ballard, founder and former CEO of Operation Underground Railroad
- Ronnie Barrett, founder of Barrett Firearms
- Patrick Bet-David, businessman and media personality
- Erik Bethel, financial professional
- Ryan Binkley, businessman and politician
- John Bolaris, realtor and former TV meteorologist
- Jim Davis, billionaire businessman
- Tim Draper, businessman
- José Fanjul, sugar baron
- Lorenzo Fertitta, entrepreneur
- John C. Harris, owner of Harris Farms
- Diane Hendricks, roofing billionaire and political figure
- Emil Henry, business leader and public policy expert
- Charles Herbster, agribusiness executive and politician
- Damon T. Hininger, businessman
- William Hornbuckle, businessman
- Sophia Hutchins, entrepreneur and socialite
- Douglas Ivester, businessman
- Charles B. Johnson, billionaire businessman
- Perry Johnson, businessman and political candidate
- Peter Karmanos Jr., businessman
- Adam Kidan, businessman
- Erika Kirk, businesswoman and nonprofit executive
- Henry Kravis, businessman
- Shalabh Kumar, businessman
- John C. Malone, businessman, landowner, and philanthropist
- Shaun McCutcheon, businessman and plaintiff of McCutcheon v. FEC
- Bernie Moreno, businessman
- Rupert Murdoch, business magnate
- Vivek Ramaswamy, entrepreneur and politician
- Bruce Rastetter, businessman & entrepreneur
- Jack Roush, businessman and race team owner
- John Schnatter, entrepreneur and founder of Papa John's
- Nicole Shanahan, entrepreneur and attorney (Independent)
- John Solomon, media executive and political commentator
- Bill Spadea, businessman and radio host
- Barry Sternlicht, businessman
- Donald Trump Jr., businessman and activist (candidate's son)
- Eric Trump, businessman (candidate's son)
- Allen Weh, business executive and colonel
- Bill White, president of the Intrepid Sea, Air & Space Museum

== Actors, filmmakers and comedians ==
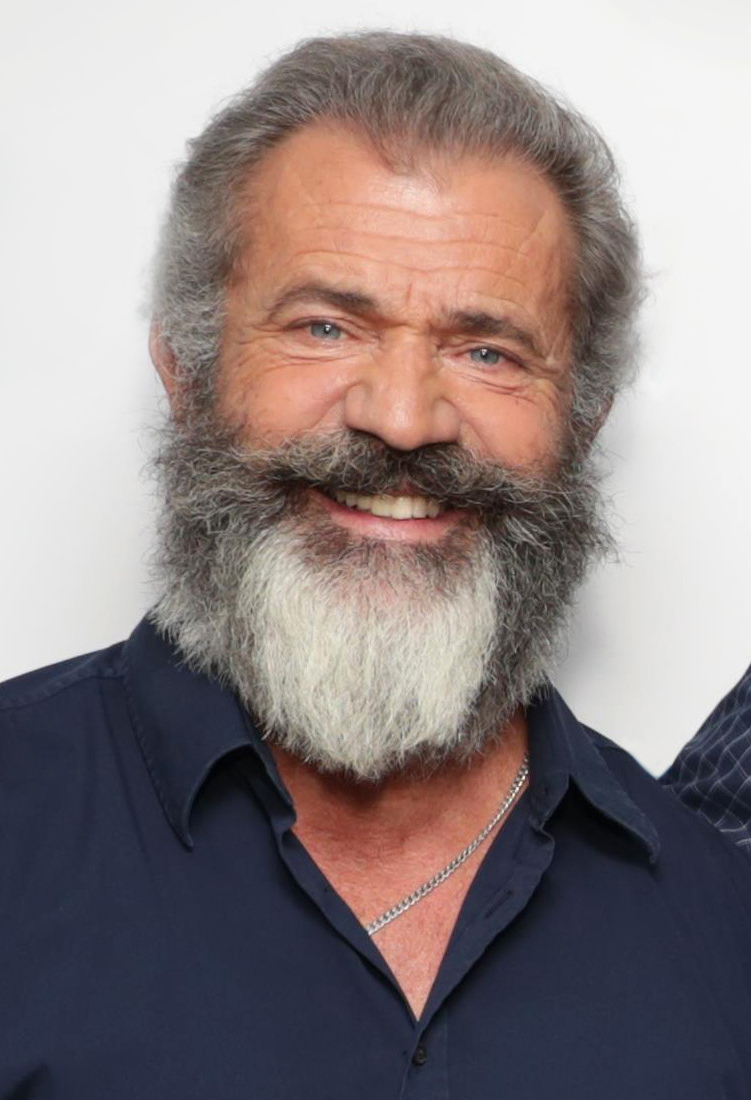
Mel Gibson

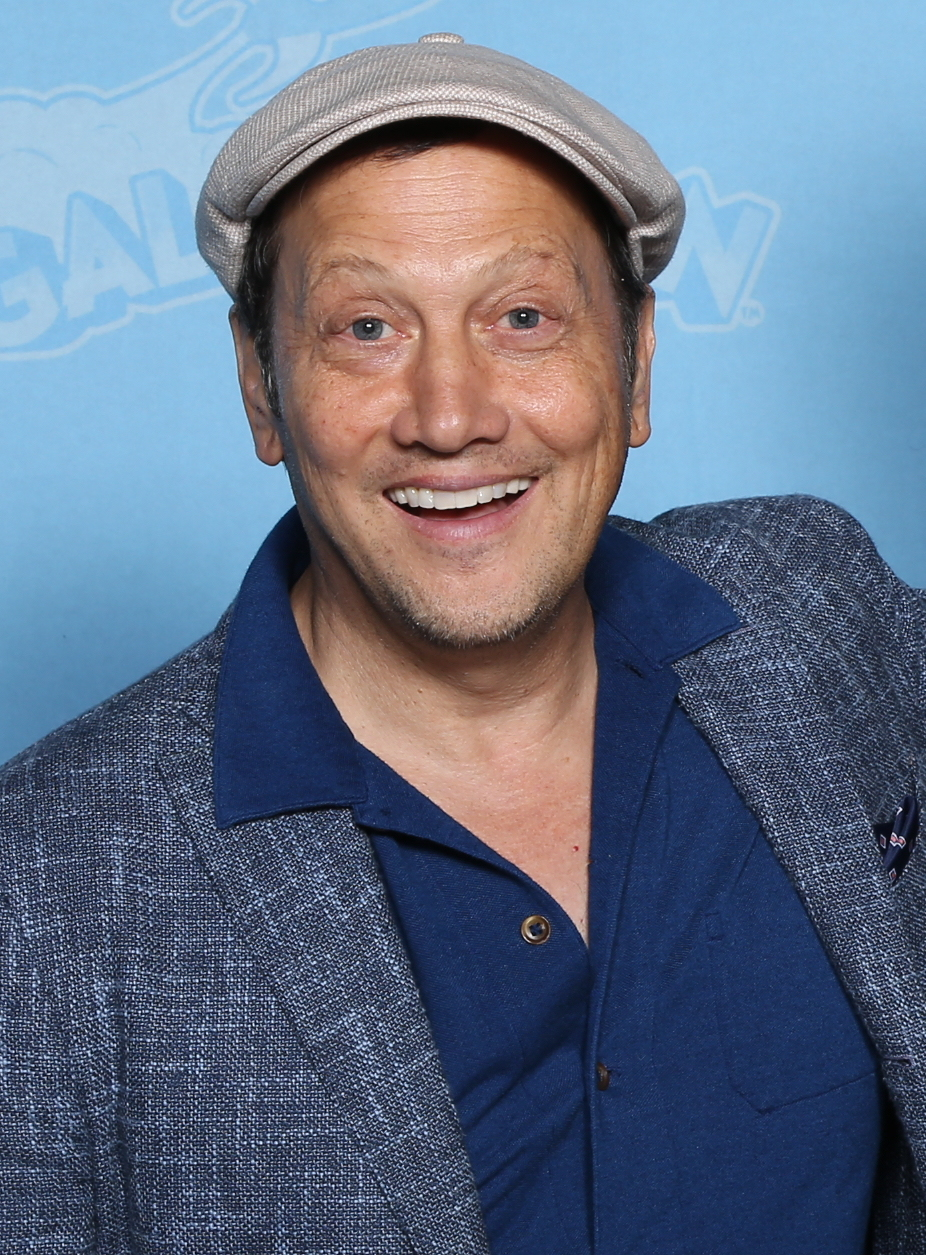
Rob Schneider

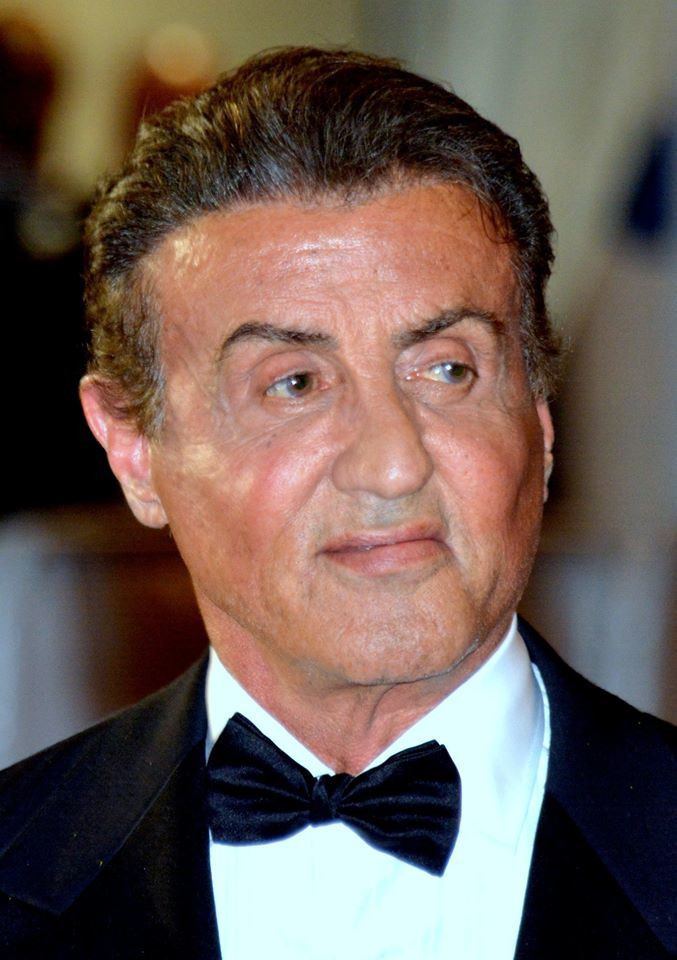
Sylvester Stallone

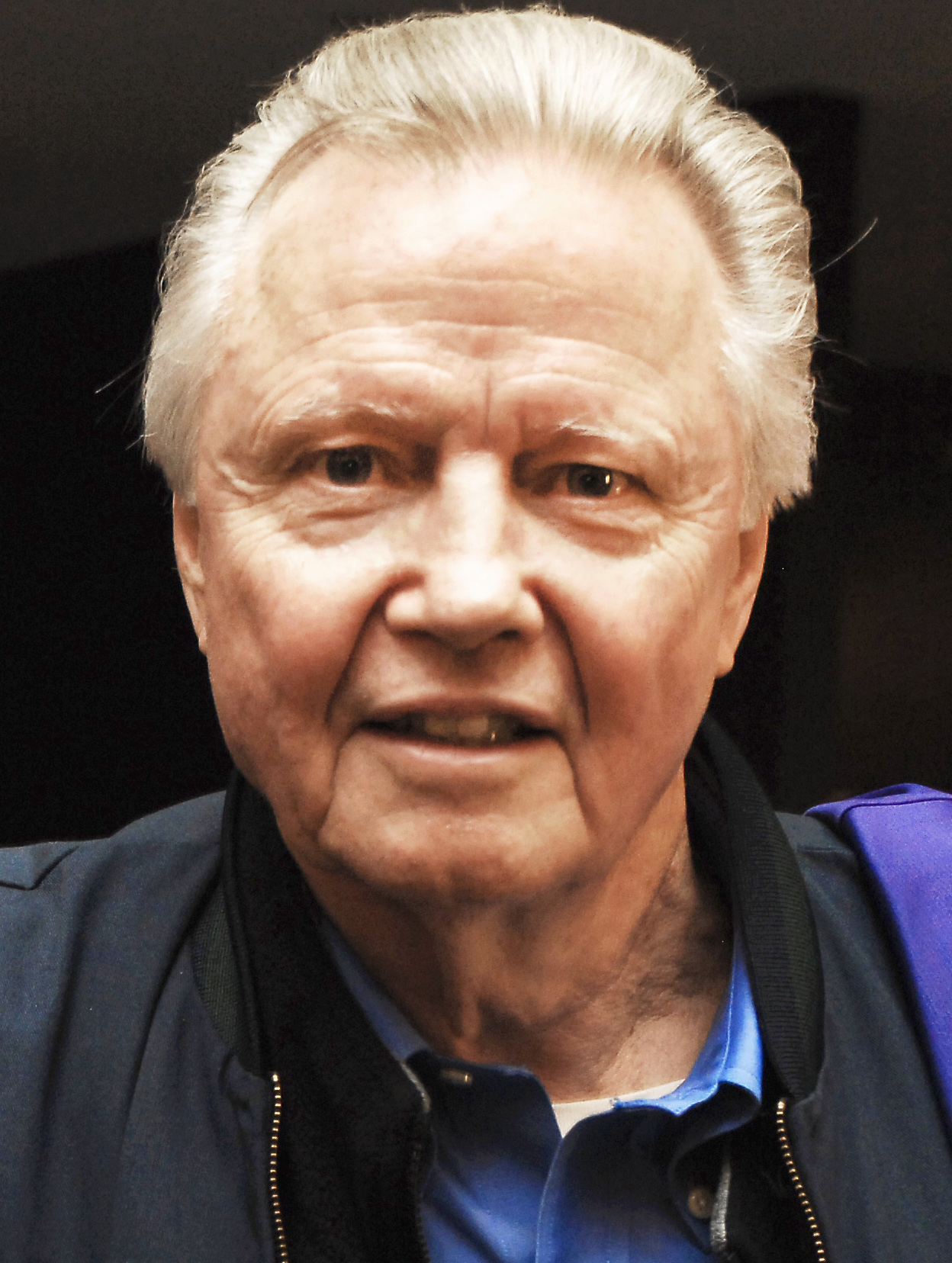
Jon Voight

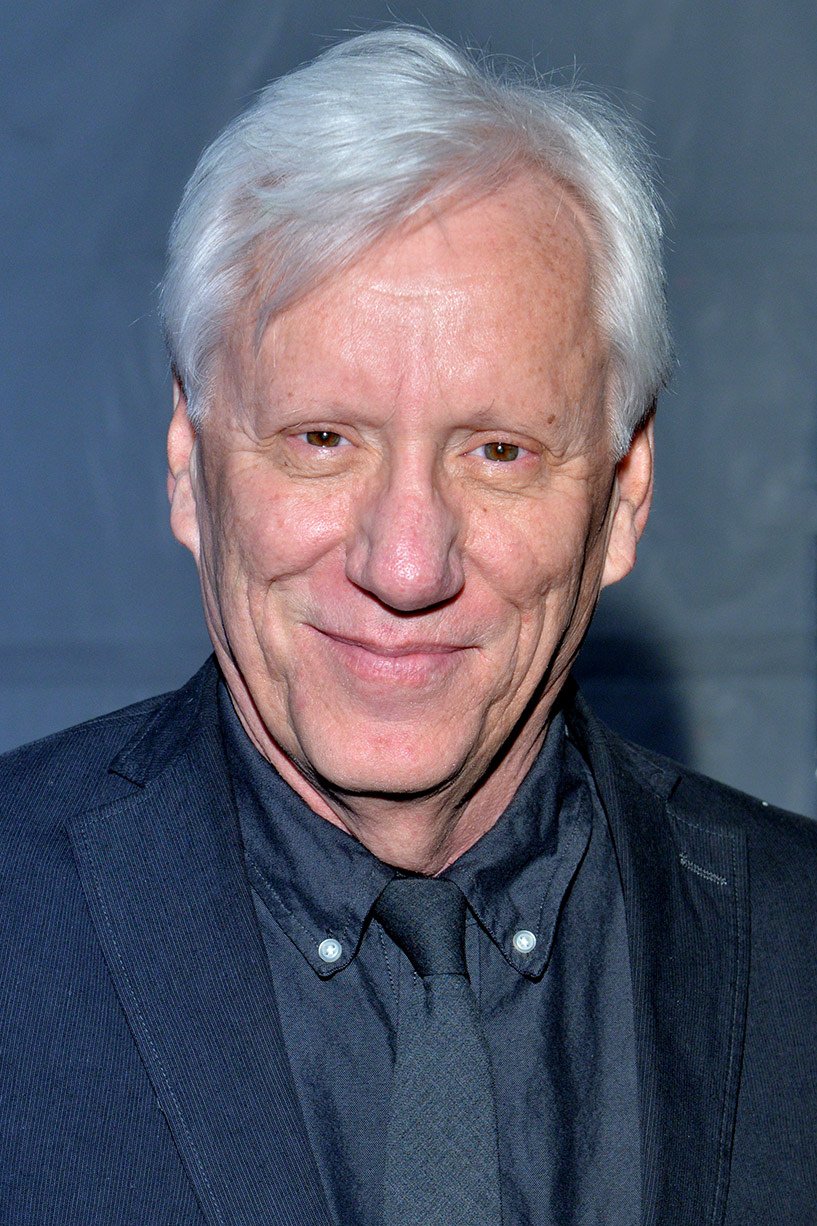
James Woods

- Janeshia Adams-Ginyard, entertainment personality
- Khalilah Ali, former wife of boxer Muhammad Ali
- Samaire Armstrong, actress
- Scott Baio, actor
- Stephen Baldwin, actor
- Roseanne Barr, actress, comedian, writer, and producer
- Martha Byrne, actress
- Dean Cain, actor
- Kirk Cameron, actor
- Nick Cannon, comedian
- Adam Carolla, comedian
- Jim Caviezel, actor
- Michael Copon, actor and producer
- Robert Davi, actor, singer, filmmaker
- Drea de Matteo, actress
- Nick Di Paolo, comedian, writer, actor and radio personality
- Tim Dillon, comedian and podcaster
- Jeff Dunham, ventriloquist and comedian
- Vincent Gallo, actor, filmmaker and musician
- Mel Gibson, actor and filmmaker
- Kelsey Grammer, actor, comedian and producer
- Brian Grazer, film and television producer
- Eddie Griffin, actor and comedian
- Tony Hinchcliffe, comedian and podcast host
- Cheryl Hines, actress and comedian (Note: previously endorsed Robert F. Kennedy Jr.)
- Victoria Jackson, comedian
- Leonarda Jonie, comedian
- Lorenzo Lamas, actor
- Zachary Levi, actor
- Alison Lohman, actress
- Mario Lopez, actor and television host
- Brandi Love, pornographic actress (Note: previously endorsed Ron DeSantis)
- Jon Lovitz, comedian and actor
- Taryn Manning, actress and singer
- Marla Maples, actress and television personality (candidate's ex-wife)
- Jenny McCarthy, actress and model
- Chuck Norris, martial artist and actor
- Susan Olsen, actress
- Kam Patterson, comedian
- Alexa PenaVega, actress
- Carlos PenaVega, actor and singer
- Joe Piscopo, actor (Independent)
- Dennis Quaid, actor
- Randy Quaid, actor
- John Ratzenberger, actor
- Maripily Rivera, actress, model and businesswoman
- Richelle Ryan, pornographic actress
- Antonio Sabàto Jr., actor
- John Schneider, actor and singer
- Rob Schneider, actor and comedian (Independent)
- Andrew Schulz, comedian and actor
- Nick Searcy, actor
- Kevin Sorbo, actor
- Frank Stallone, actor and musician
- Sylvester Stallone, actor and filmmaker
- Alex Stein, comedian and political commentator
- Kristy Swanson, actress
- Jamal Trulove, actor and wrongful murder convict
- Vince Vaughn, actor
- Jon Voight, actor
- Theo Von, comedian and podcaster
- Isaiah Washington, actor
- James Woods, actor
- Chuck Zito, actor

== Television personalities ==
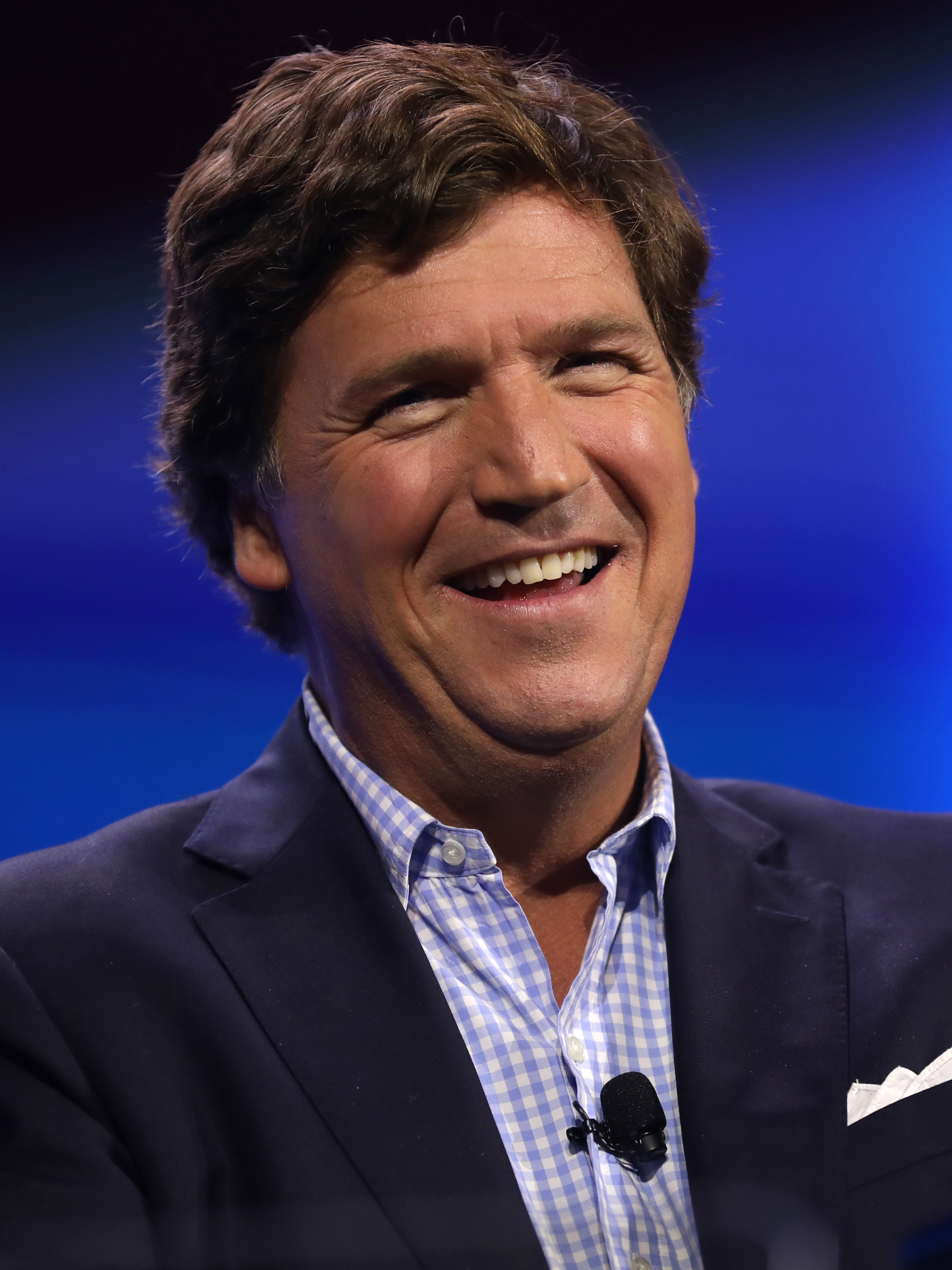
Tucker Carlson

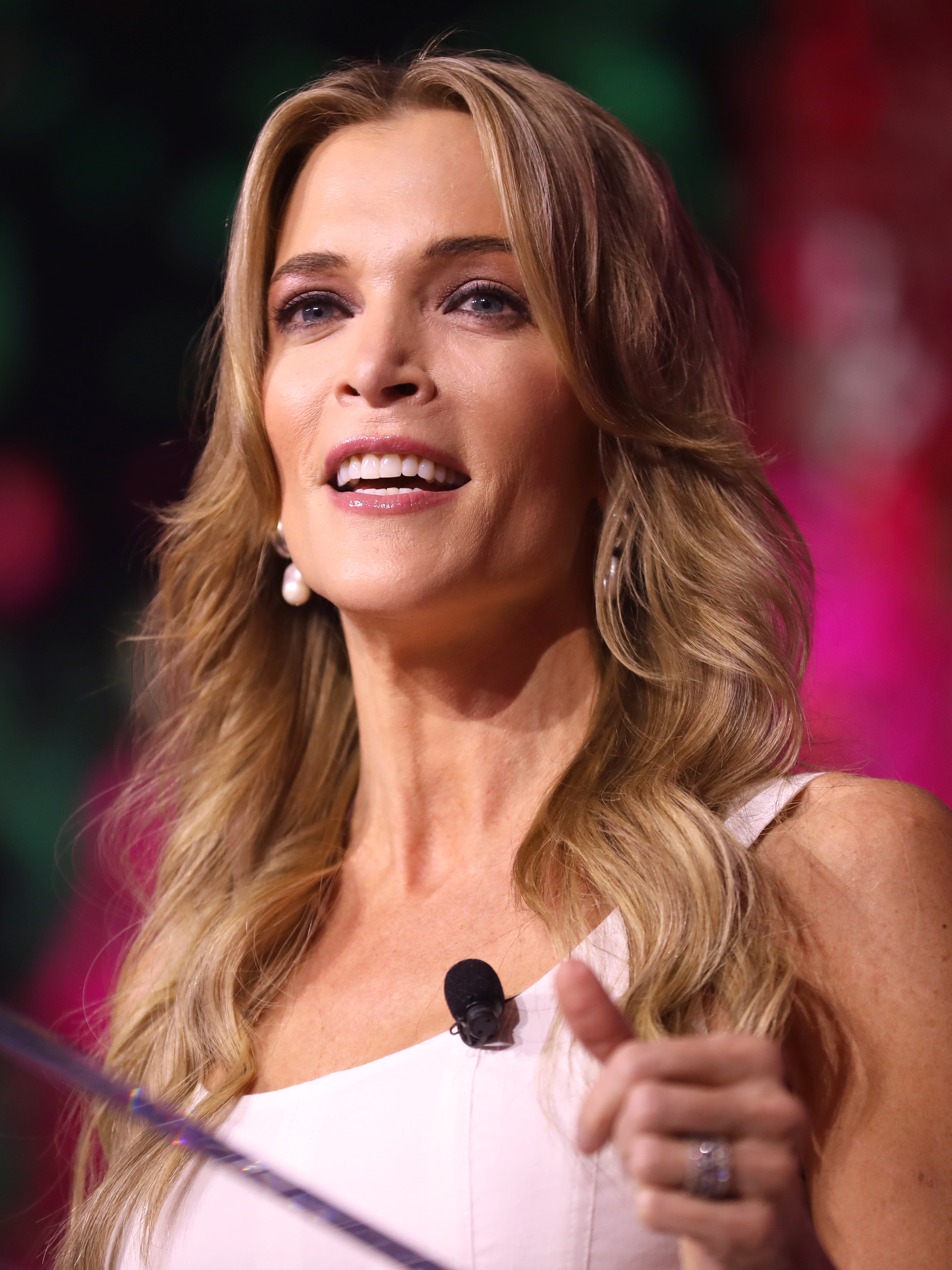
Megyn Kelly

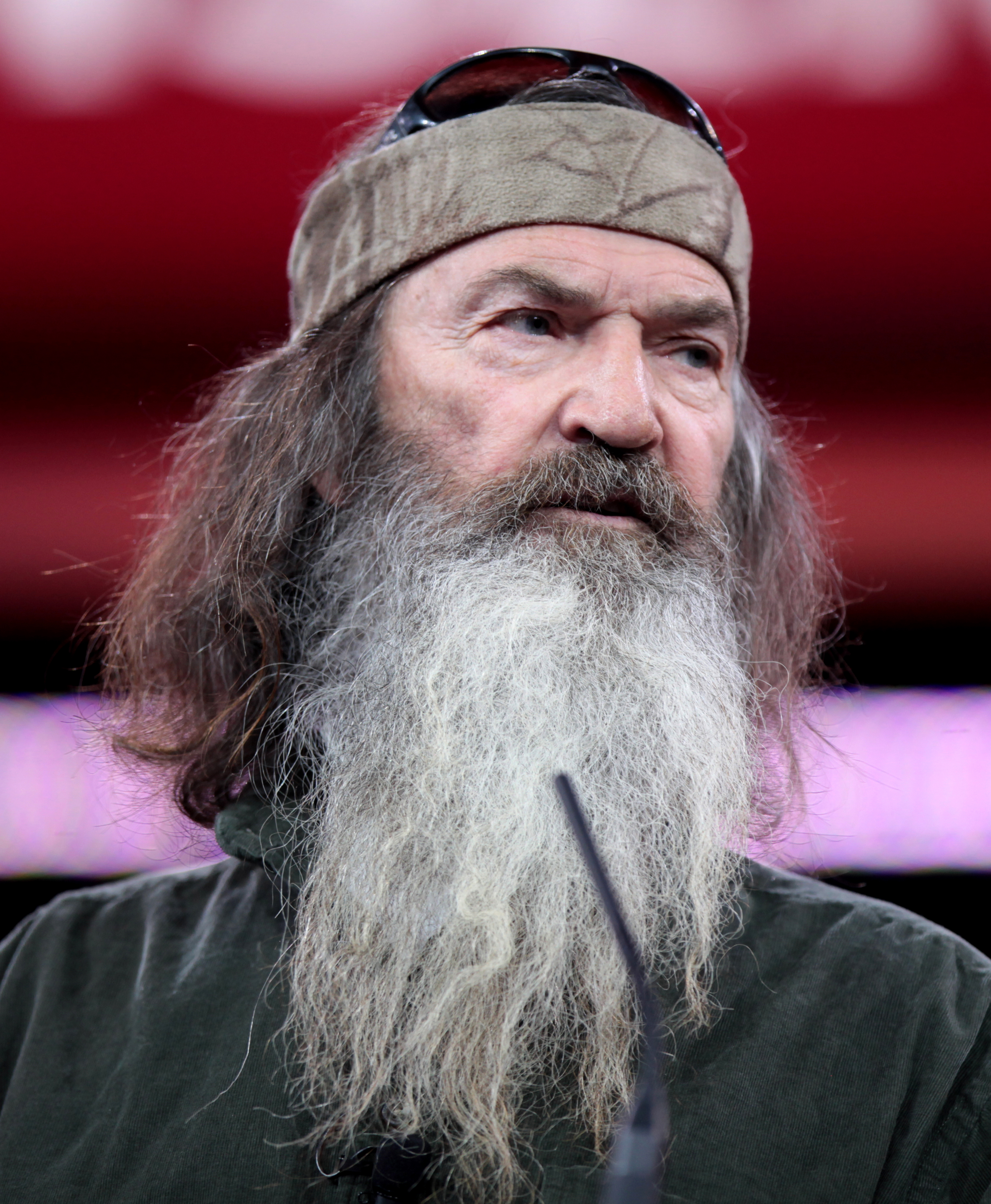
Phil Robertson

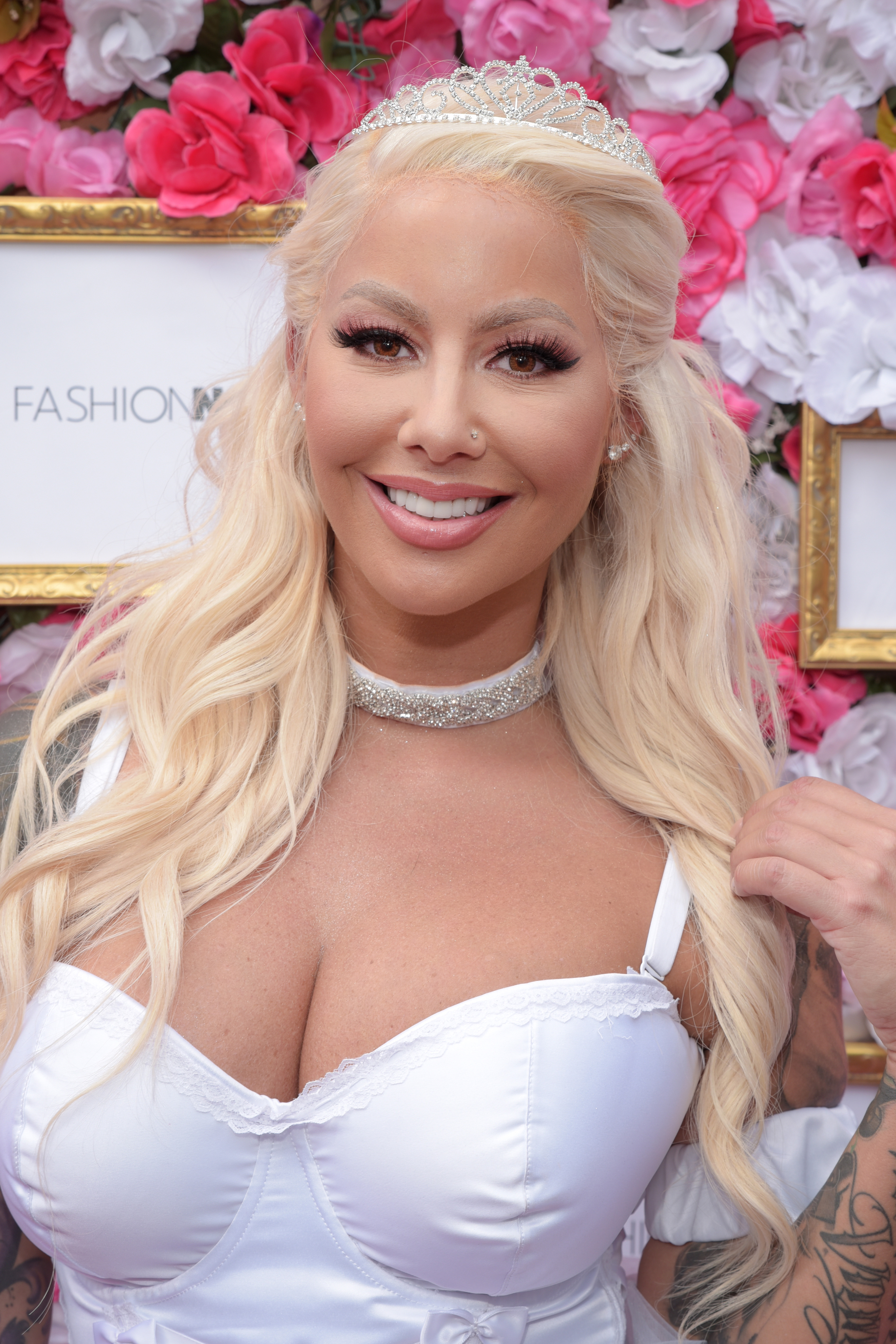
Amber Rose

- Charly Arnolt, American sports broadcaster and television personality for OutKick
- Glenn Beck, political commentator, CEO, founder, and owner of Mercury Radio Arts (Independent)
- Del Bigtree, television producer and anti-vaccination activist
- Dan Bongino, political commentator
- Thom Brennaman, sports commentator
- Tammy Bruce, broadcaster and political activist
- Grant Cardone, financial influencer and real estate investor
- Tucker Carlson, political commentator
- Duane Chapman, bounty hunter and television personality
- Savannah Chrisley, reality television personality and influencer
- Steven Crowder, political commentator
- Joe Exotic, media personality, former owner of Greater Wynnewood Exotic Animal Park and former 2024 presidential candidate (Democratic)
- Siggy Flicker, relationship specialist
- Mike Gallagher, conservative commentator and radio host
- Day Gardner, model
- Sebastian Gorka, political analyst
- Andrew Gruel, television chef
- Vinny Guadagnino, reality television personality
- Greg Gutfeld, commentator (Libertarian)
- Josh Hammer, political commentator and lawyer
- Sean Hannity, television host and political commentator (Conservative Party of New York State)
- Sig Hansen, television personality
- Charles Hurt, political commentator
- Laura Ingraham, radio and television host
- Caitlyn Jenner, media personality and Olympic gold medalist in the decathlon
- Benny Johnson, conservative commentator
- Greg Kelly, television host and political commentator
- Megyn Kelly, political commentator, journalist, media personality, and former host of The Kelly File (Independent)
- Michael Knowles, political commentator and author
- Lady MAGA, conservative drag queen
- Kari Lake, news anchor and political candidate
- Phil McGraw, television personality and author
- Eric Metaxas, conservative talk show host
- Jillian Michaels, personal trainer
- Heidi Montag, reality television personality
- Stephen Moore, economic commentator
- Dick Morris, political commentator and consultant
- Maye Musk, model and dietitian
- Sheila Nazarian, plastic surgeon and television personality
- Troy Newman, activist
- Bill O'Reilly, television host and writer
- Vince Offer, television pitchman
- Jack Osbourne, media personality
- Candace Owens, political commentator
- Liz Peek, conservative commentator and business analyst
- Drew Pinsky, media personality and physician
- Spencer Pratt, reality television personality
- Michael Reagan, television personality and journalist
- Santino Rice, fashion designer and television personality
- Jase Robertson, hunter and reality television personality
- Phil Robertson, hunter, reality television personality and businessman
- Si Robertson, hunter and reality television personality
- Wayne Allyn Root, radio host
- Amber Rose, model and television personality
- Dave Rubin, political commentator
- Ben Shapiro, political commentator
- Silk, Newsmax host
- Dave Smith, political commentator and comedian (Libertarian)
- Dave 'Heavy D' Sparks, custom vehicle shop owner and reality television personality
- Sage Steele, sports announcer
- Jon Taffer, television host
- Kendra Todd, Winner of the 3rd season of The Apprentice
- Tyrus, broadcaster and former wrestler
- Jesse Watters, conservative political commentator (Conservative)
- Liz Wheeler, conservative political commentator
- Chuck Woolery, former game show host

== Online personalities ==
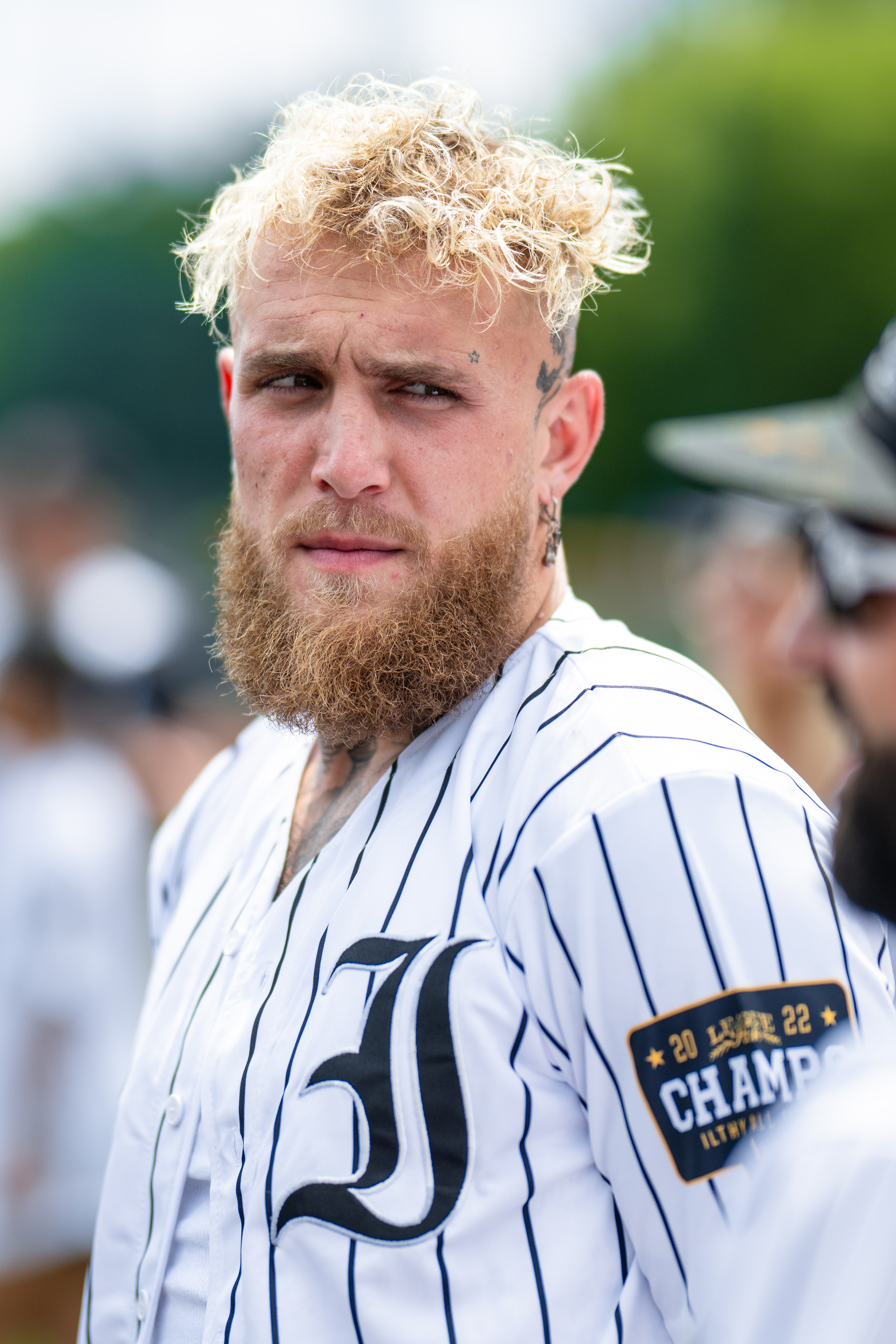
Jake Paul

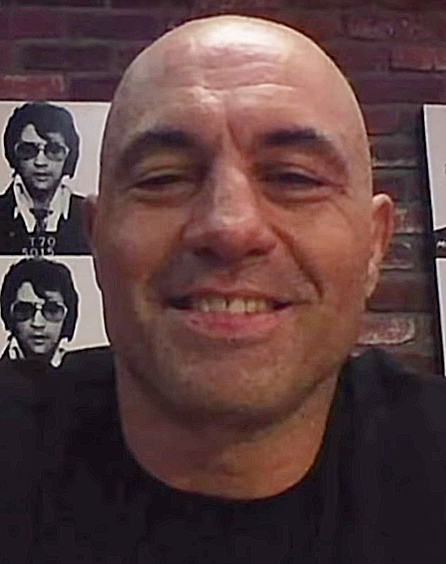
Joe Rogan

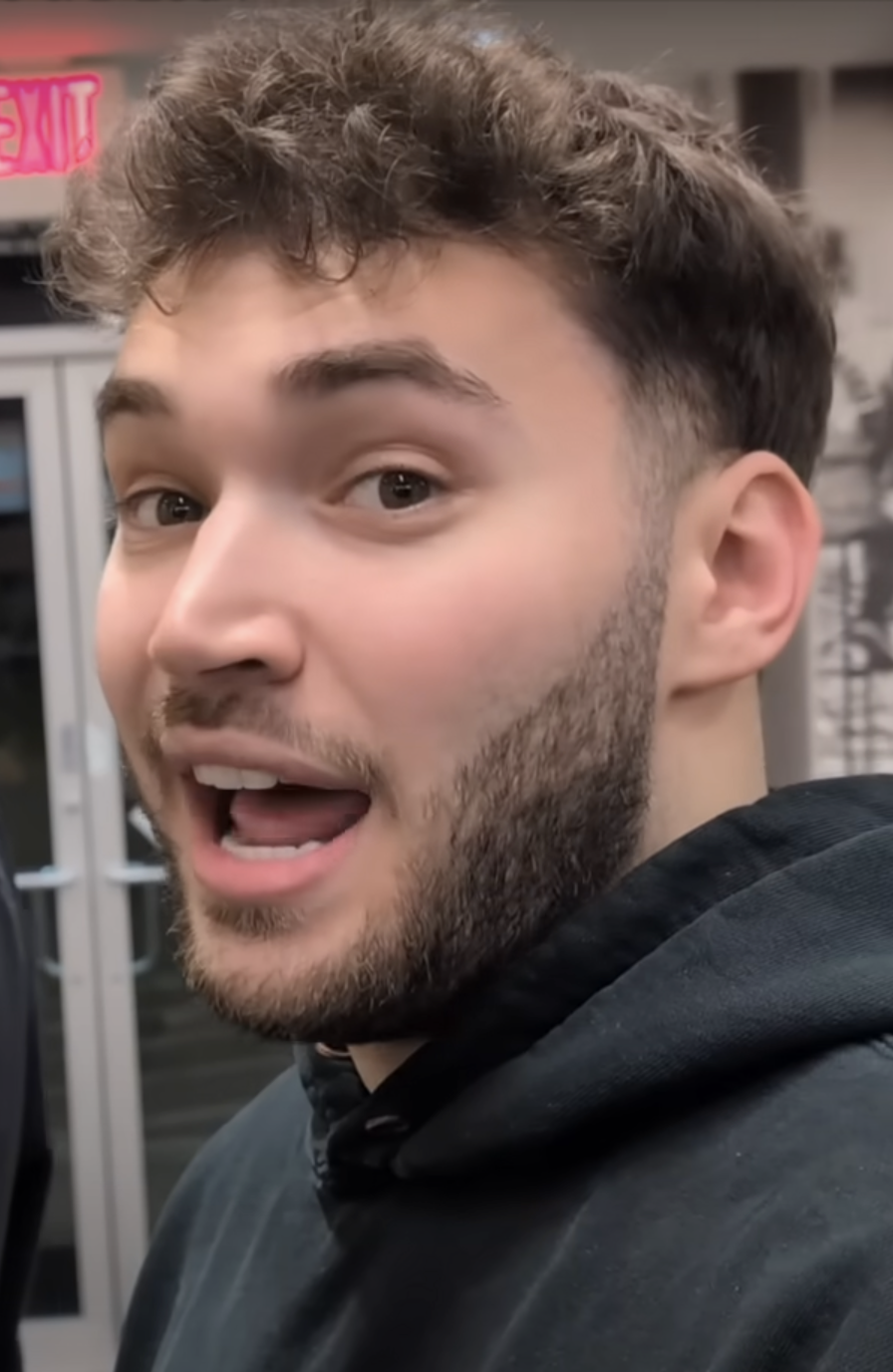
Adin Ross

- DJ Akademiks, media personality
- Baked Alaska, media personality and participant in the 2021 United States Capitol attack
- Noland Arbaugh, first human recipient of a Neuralink implant
- Asmongold, online streamer and political commentator
- Emily Austin, social media influencer and journalist
- Catturd, anonymous Twitter shitposter
- Alex Clark, podcaster and wellness influencer
- Brett Cooper, conservative political commentator, media personality, and actress
- Hannah Pearl Davis, YouTuber and political commentator
- Xaviaer DuRousseau, social media influencer
- Bryce Hall, Tiktoker, YouTuber, and bare knuckle boxer
- Cole LaBrant, YouTuber
- Savannah LaBrant, YouTuber
- Keemstar, YouTuber
- Libs of TikTok, far-right social media personality
- Link Lauren, TikTok content creator and political news online influencer
- Naked Cowboy, street performer
- Tariq Nasheed, media personality and film producer
- Nickmercs, streamer and YouTuber
- Jake Paul, influencer and professional boxer (Note: previously endorsed Vivek Ramaswamy)
- Logan Paul, YouTuber, boxer, professional wrestler, and co-founder of Prime and Lunchly
- Chris Plante, radio personality
- Tim Pool, YouTuber and political commentator
- Adin Ross, social media personality and online streamer
- Joe Rogan, podcaster and comedian
- Nick Shirley, YouTuber
- Sneako, political commentator
- Bill Spadea, radio host
- Andrew Tate, internet personality
- Brandon Tatum, YouTuber and political commentator
- Kai Trump, social media personality and college golfer (candidate's granddaughter)
- Tiffany Trump, internet personality (candidate's daughter)
- Matt Walsh, conservative political commentator
- Bret Weinstein, podcaster and author
- Blaire White, YouTuber and political commentator

== Musicians ==
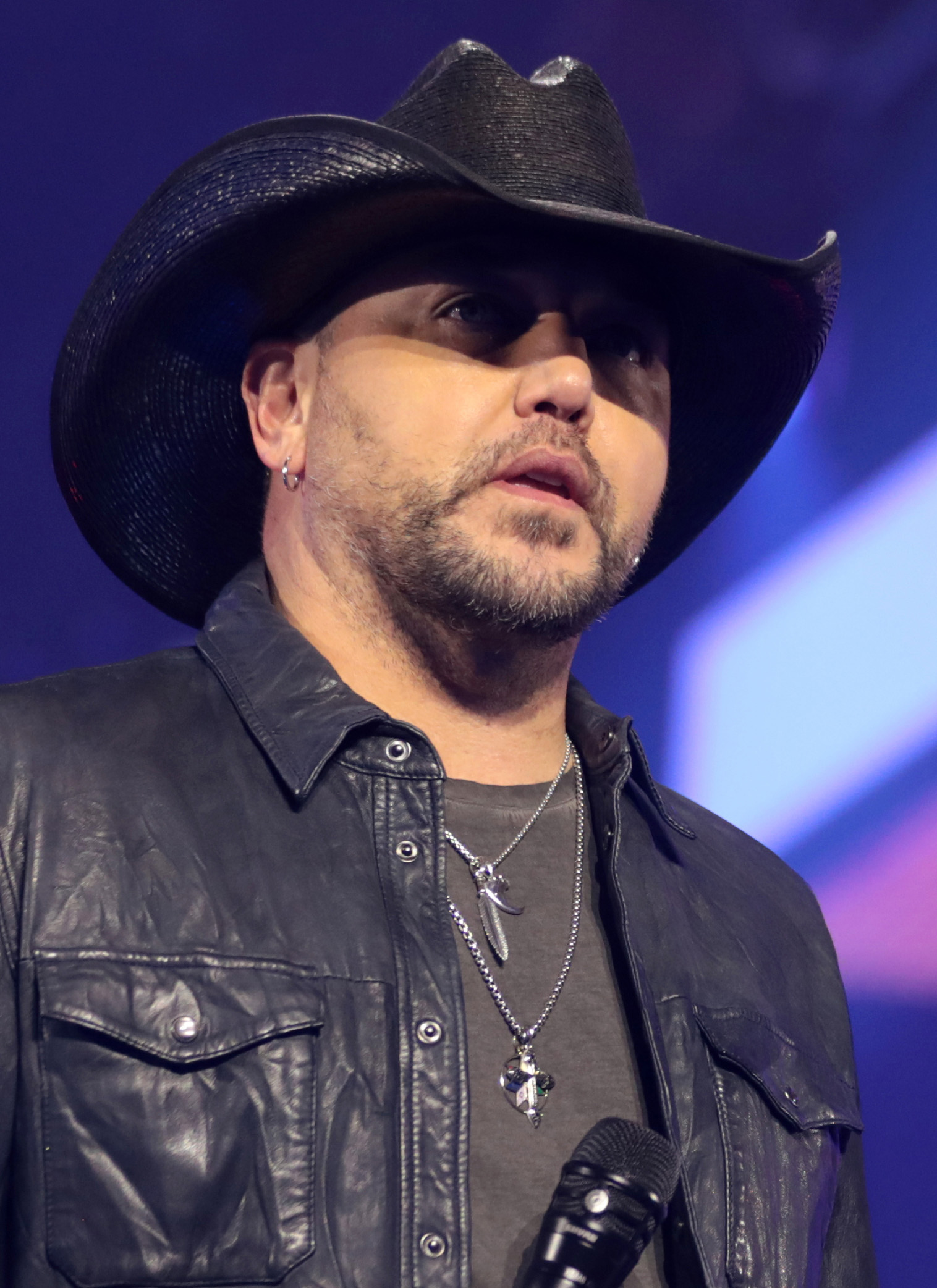
Jason Aldean

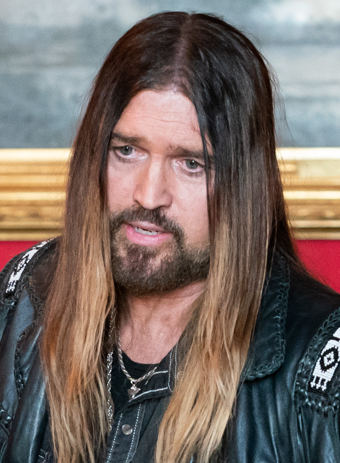
Billy Ray Cyrus

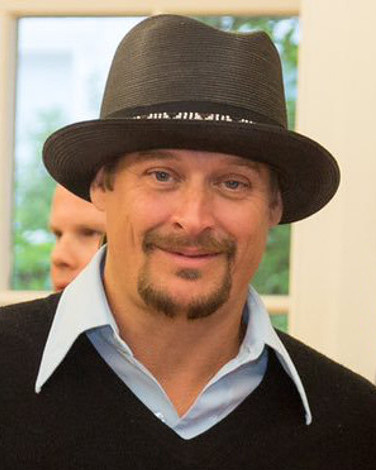
Kid Rock

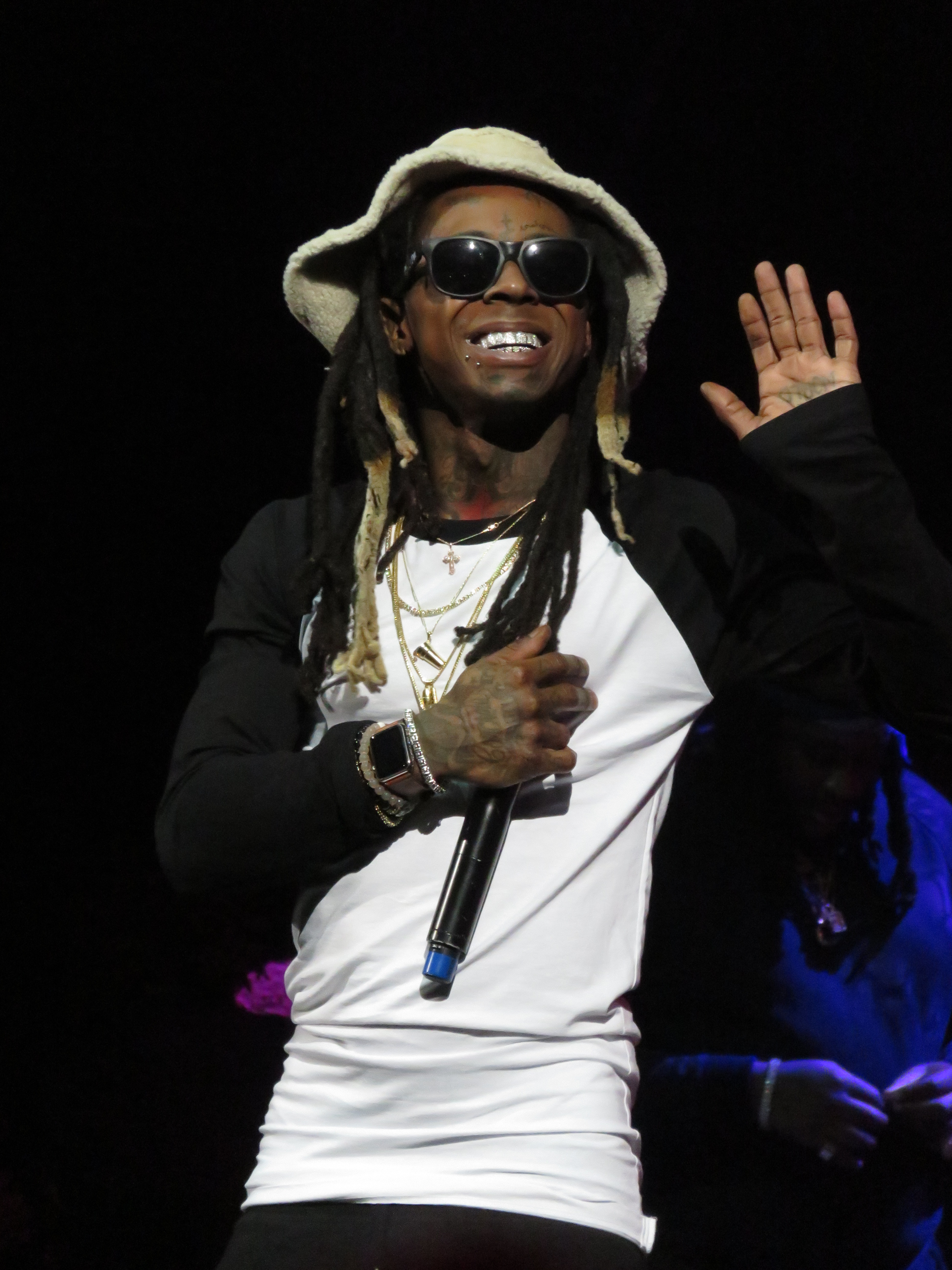
Lil Wayne

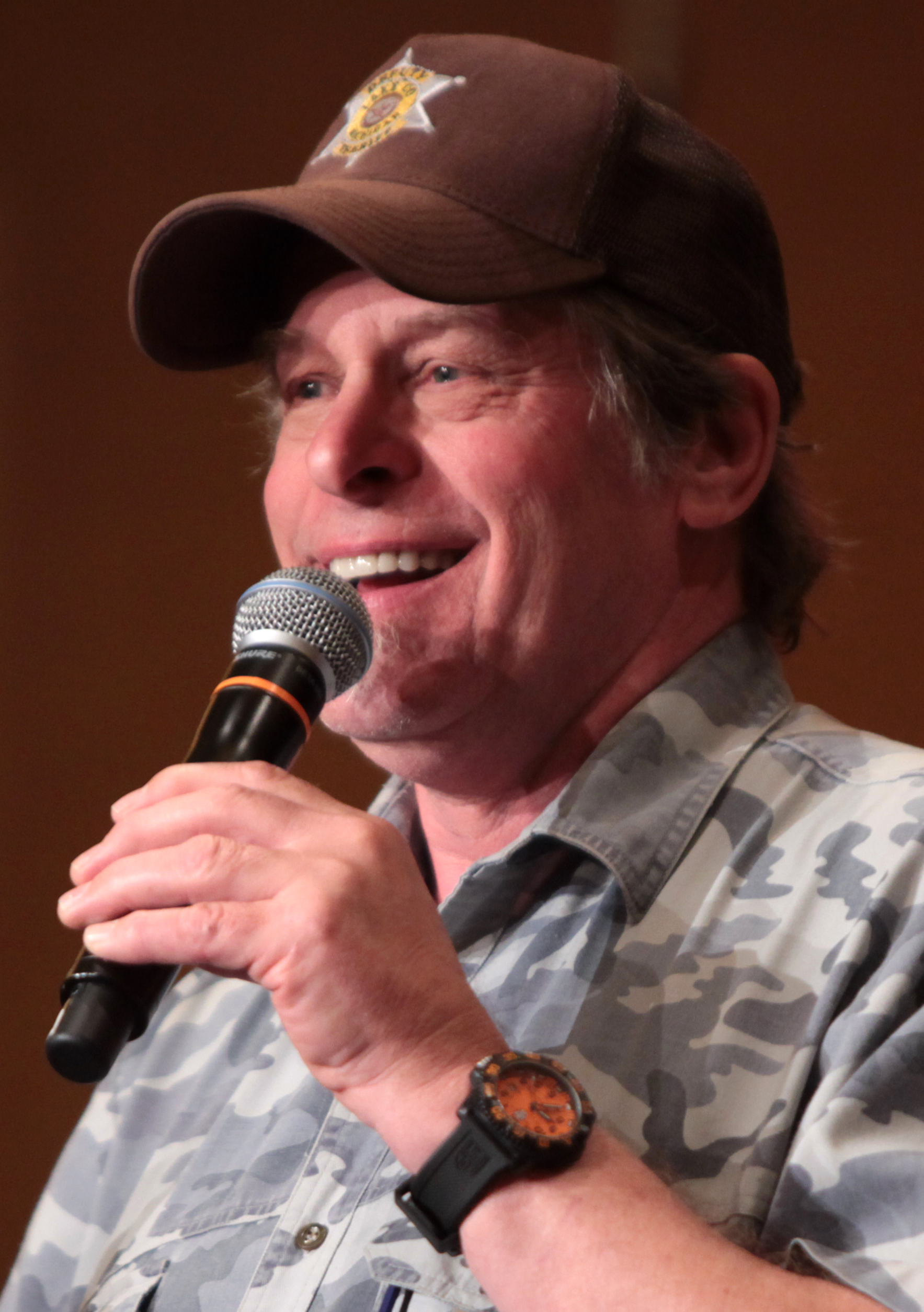
Ted Nugent

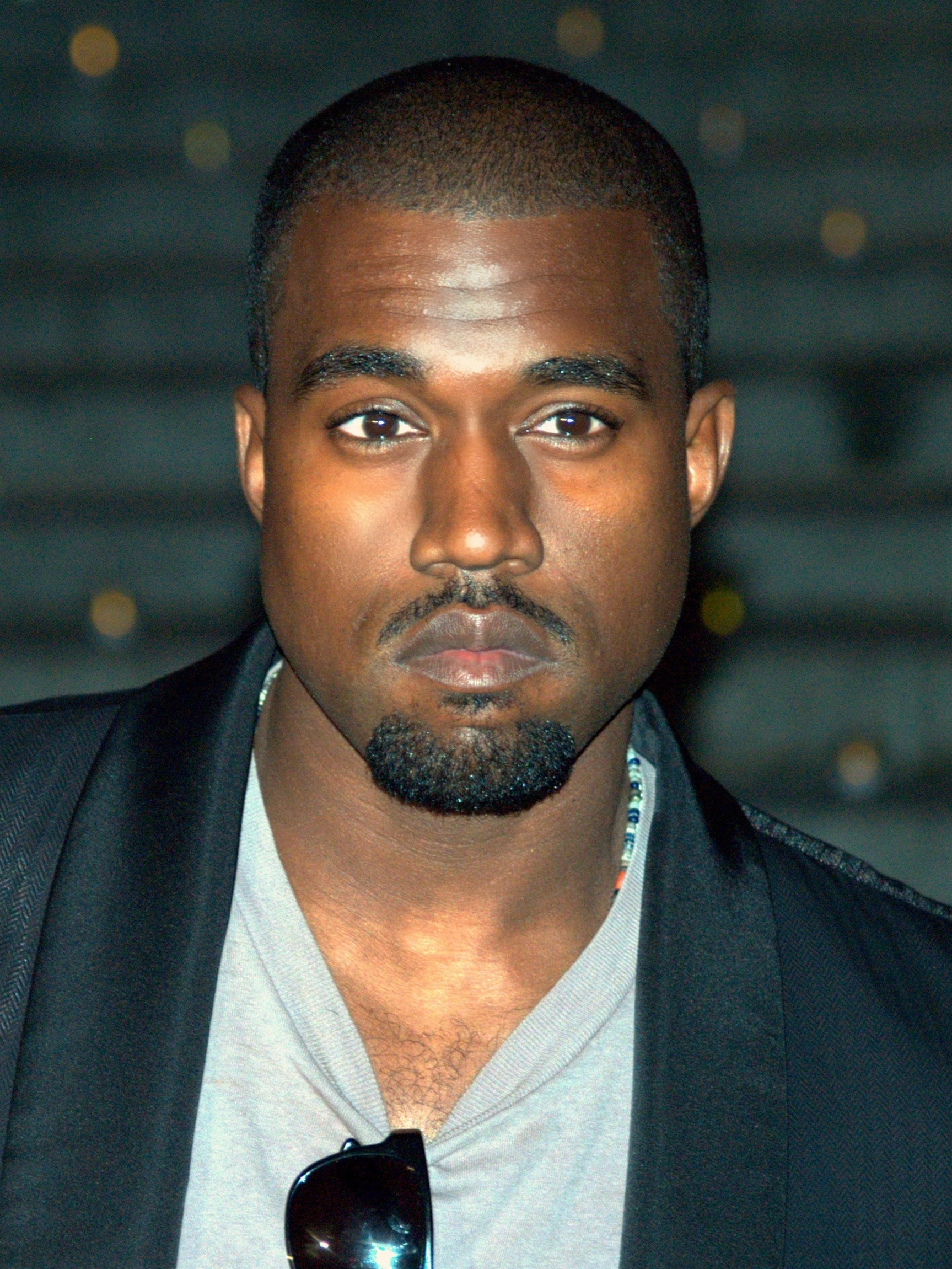
Kanye West

- 3lau, DJ
- 42 Dugg, rapper
- 6ix9ine, rapper
- Gavin Adcock, singer
- Trace Adkins, singer
- Jason Aldean, singer
- Duane Allen, member of The Oak Ridge Boys
- Anuel AA, rapper
- Brad Arnold, lead singer of Three Doors Down
- Rodney Atkins, singer
- ~~Azealia Banks, rapper~~ (Note: switched endorsement to Kamala Harris; later voted for Trump anyway)
- Dicky Barrett, lead singer of The Defiant and former lead singer of The Mighty Mighty Bosstones
- Benny the Butcher, rapper
- BigXthaPlug, rapper
- Kodak Black, rapper
- Bleona, singer
- Pat Boone, singer
- Boosie Badazz, rapper
- Jonathan Cain, keyboardist for Journey
- Craig Campbell, singer
- Alisa Childers, singer, Christian author and apologist and former member of ZOEgirl
- Willie Colón, musician
- John Cooper, lead vocalist of Skillet
- Billy Ray Cyrus, singer
- DaBaby, rapper
- Chris DeStefano, singer
- John Dolmayan, drummer of System of a Down
- Clare Dunn, singer
- Sean Feucht, singer, Christian worship leader and political activist
- Five for Fighting, singer and songwriter
- Fivio Foreign, rapper
- Forgiato Blow, rapper
- Ace Frehley, lead guitarist of Kiss
- Brantley Gilbert, singer
- Danny Gokey, singer and former American Idol contestant
- Michale Graves, former lead singer of Misfits
- Icewear Vezzo, rapper
- ~~Nicky Jam, singer~~ (Note: endorsement rescinded)
- Chris Janson, singer
- Kay Flock, rapper
- Brian Kelley, singer of Florida Georgia Line
- Kid Rock, singer
- Phil Labonte, lead vocalist of All That Remains
- Blackie Lawless, lead vocalist of W.A.S.P.
- Tracy Lawrence, singer
- Swae Lee, rapper and singer
- Aaron Lewis, lead vocalist of Staind
- Lil Pump, rapper
- Lil Wayne, rapper
- Brian Littrell, singer and member of the Backstreet Boys
- Lord Jamar, rapper and member of Brand Nubian
- Lovari, singer
- Mike Love, lead singer for The Beach Boys
- John Lydon, lead vocalist of the Sex Pistols
- Christopher Macchio, singer
- Mase, rapper
- Ken Mellons, singer
- Money Man, rapper
- Justin Moore, singer
- Craig Morgan, singer
- Jerrod Niemann, singer
- Ted Nugent, guitarist and singer
- Martin O'Donnell, video game composer
- OhGeesy, rapper
- Natasha Owens, singer
- Pete Parada, drummer
- Duane Peters, lead singer of U.S. Bombs
- Ariel Pink, musician
- Justin Quiles, singer
- Ronnie Radke, lead vocalist of Falling in Reverse
- Ray J, singer
- John Rich, singer
- Teddy Riley, record producer and songwriter
- Sada Baby, rapper
- ~~Sexyy Red, rapper~~ (Note: switched endorsement to Kamala Harris)
- Elvie Shane, singer
- Sheff G, rapper
- Gene Simmons, co-lead vocalist and bassist of Kiss
- Ricky Skaggs, singer
- Sleepy Hallow, rapper
- Nate Smith, singer
- Doug Stone, singer
- Styles P, rapper
- Jessica Sutta, member of The Pussycat Dolls
- Michael Sweet, lead vocalist of Stryper
- Topher, rapper and conservative commentator
- Trick Trick, rapper
- Travis Tritt, singer
- Vanilla Ice, rapper
- Joy Villa, singer
- Waka Flocka Flame, rapper
- Chris Webby, rapper
- Kanye West, rapper and record producer
- Alexis Wilkins, singer
- Hank Williams Jr., singer
- Anne Wilson, singer
- Gretchen Wilson, singer

== Sports figures ==
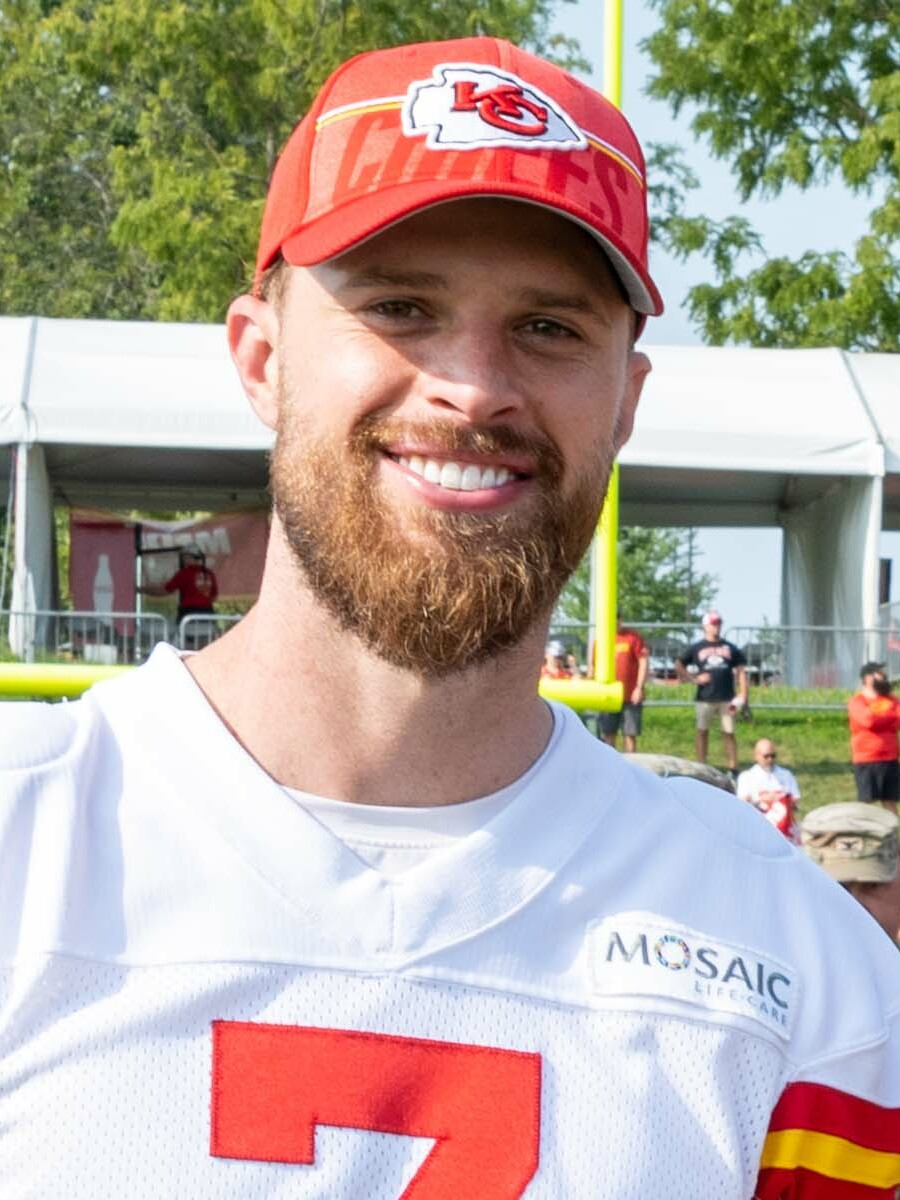
Harrison Butker

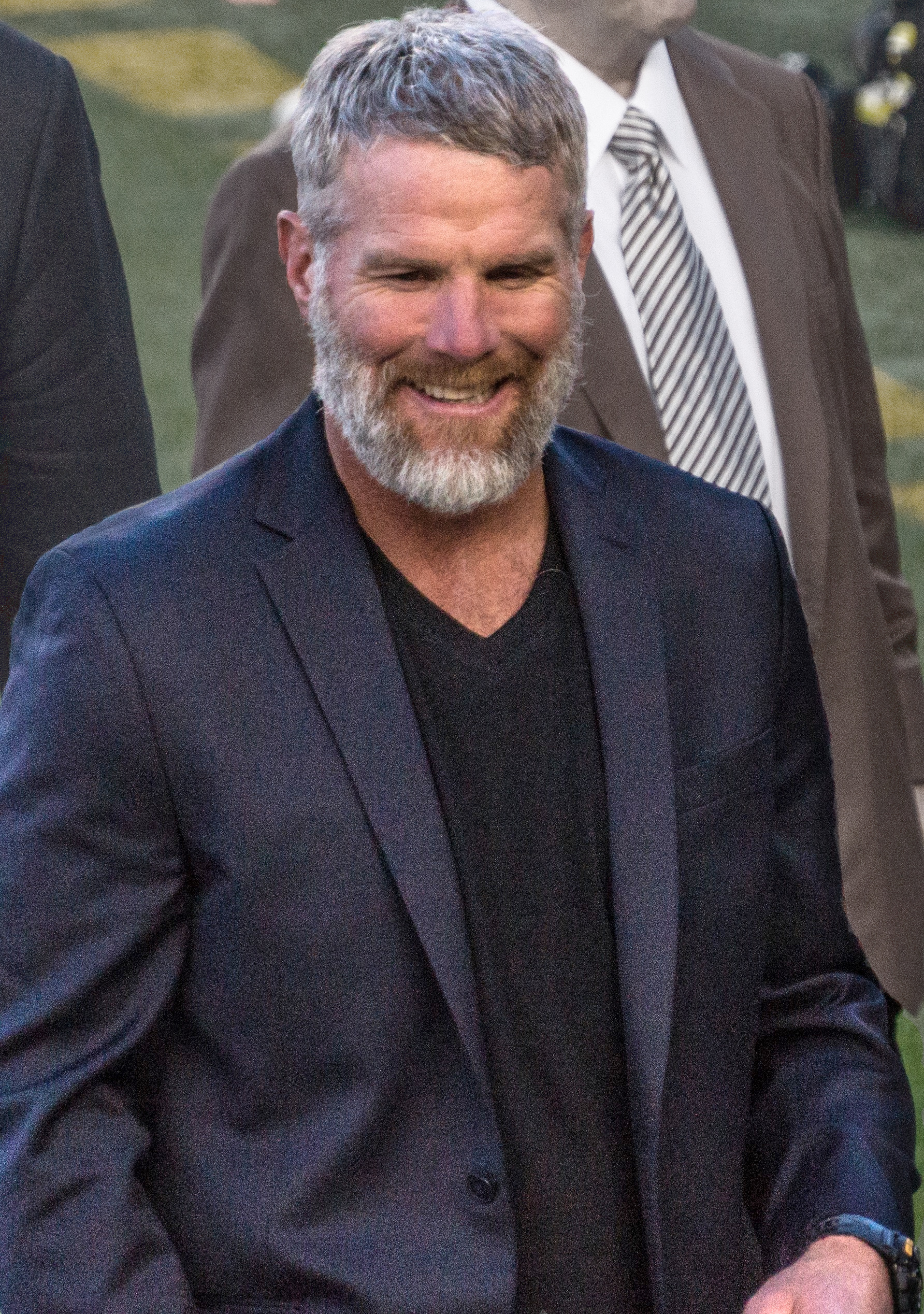
Brett Favre

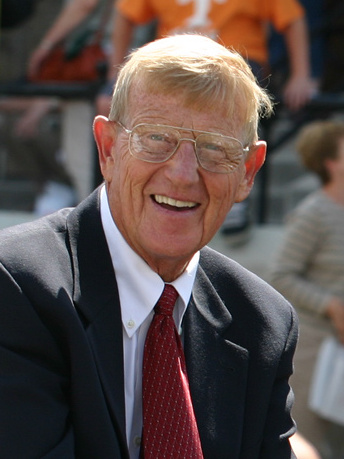
Lou Holtz

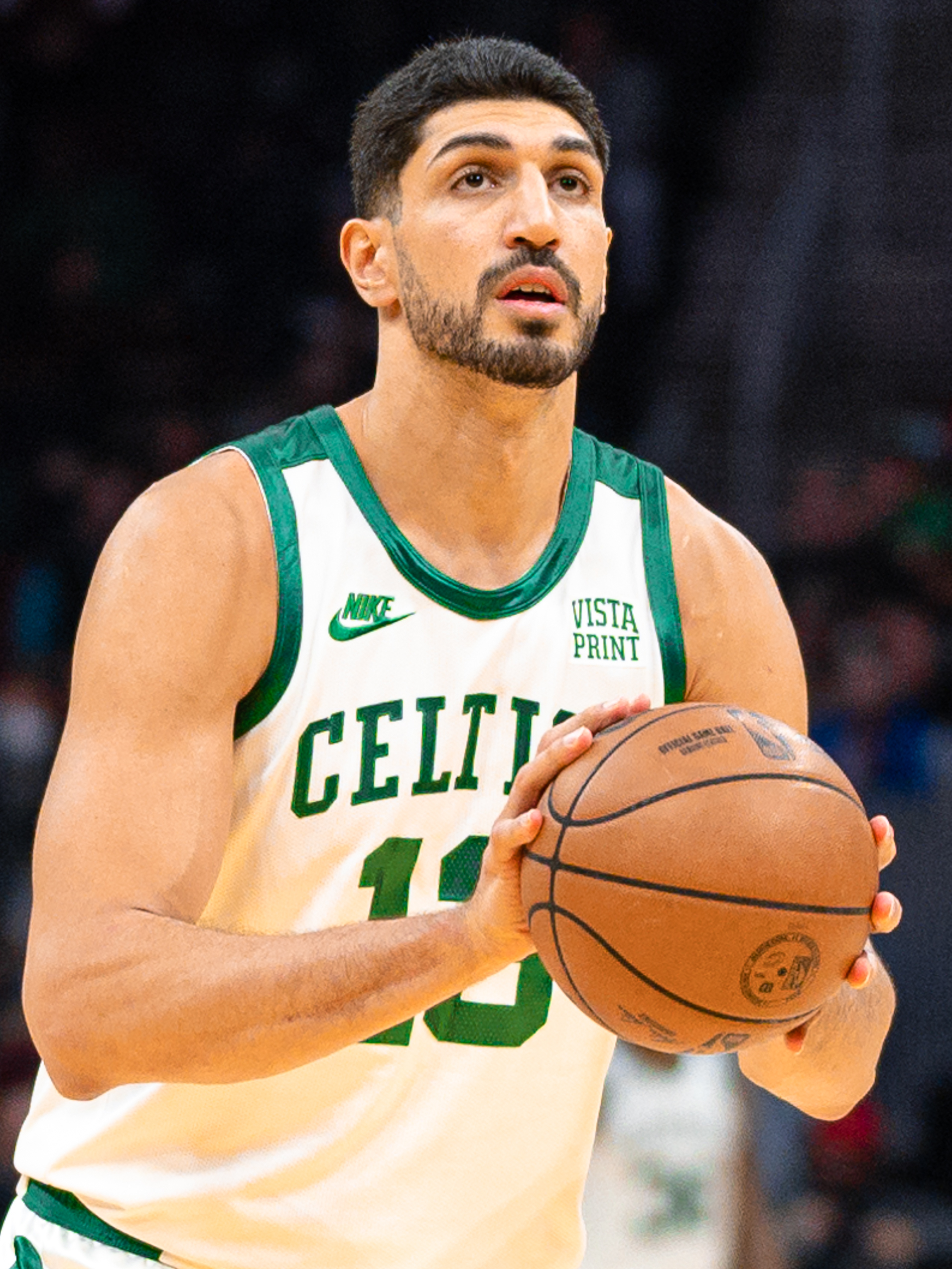
Enes Kanter Freedom

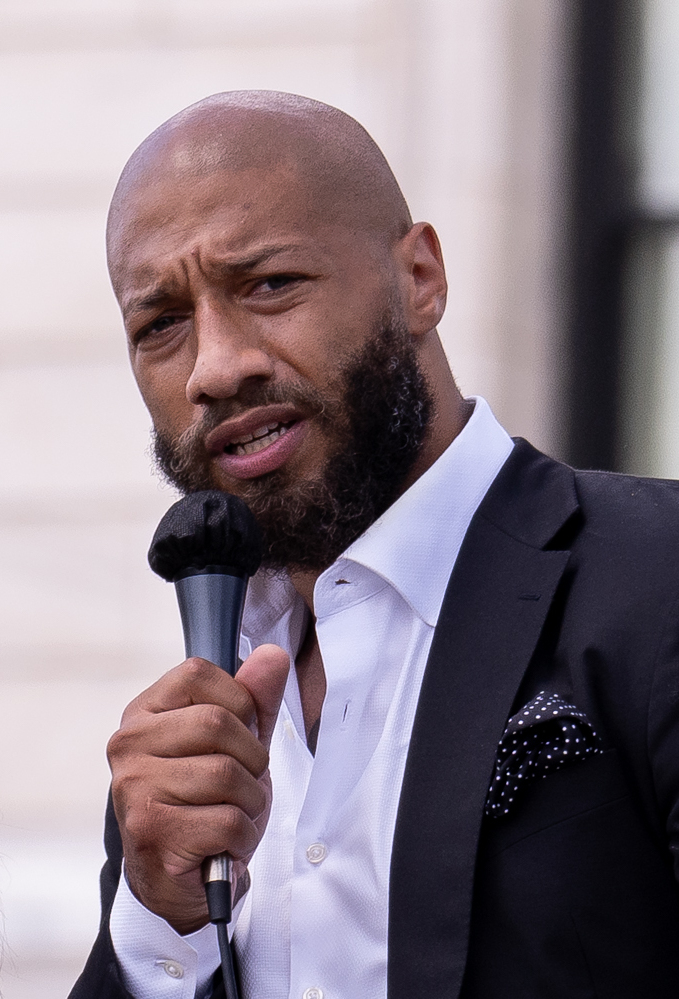
Royce White

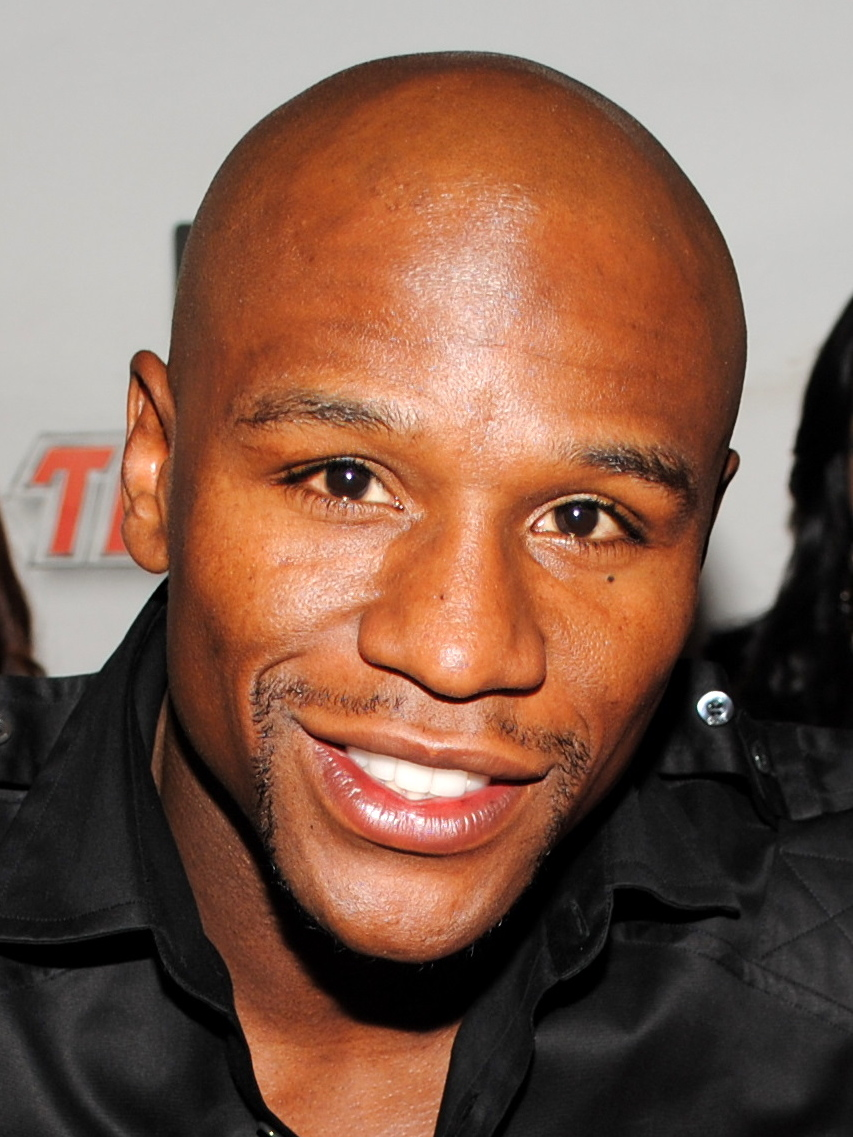
Floyd Mayweather Jr.

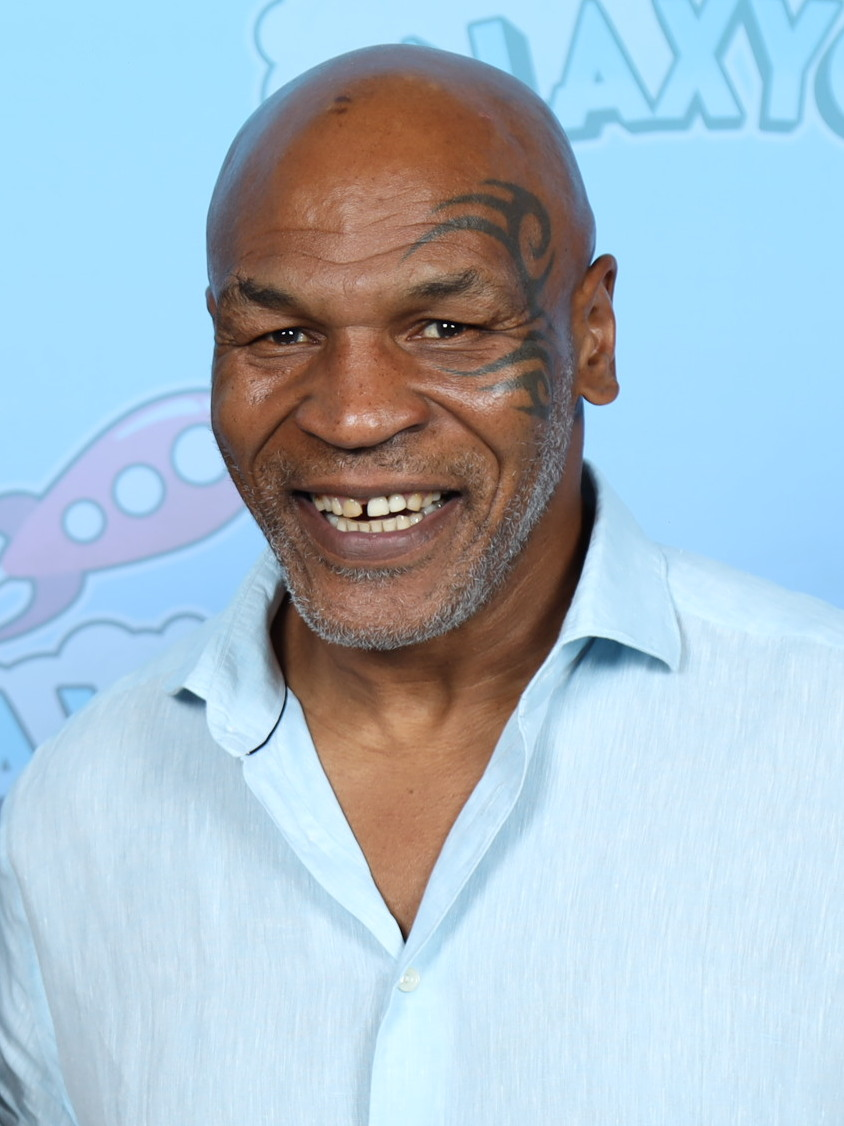
Mike Tyson

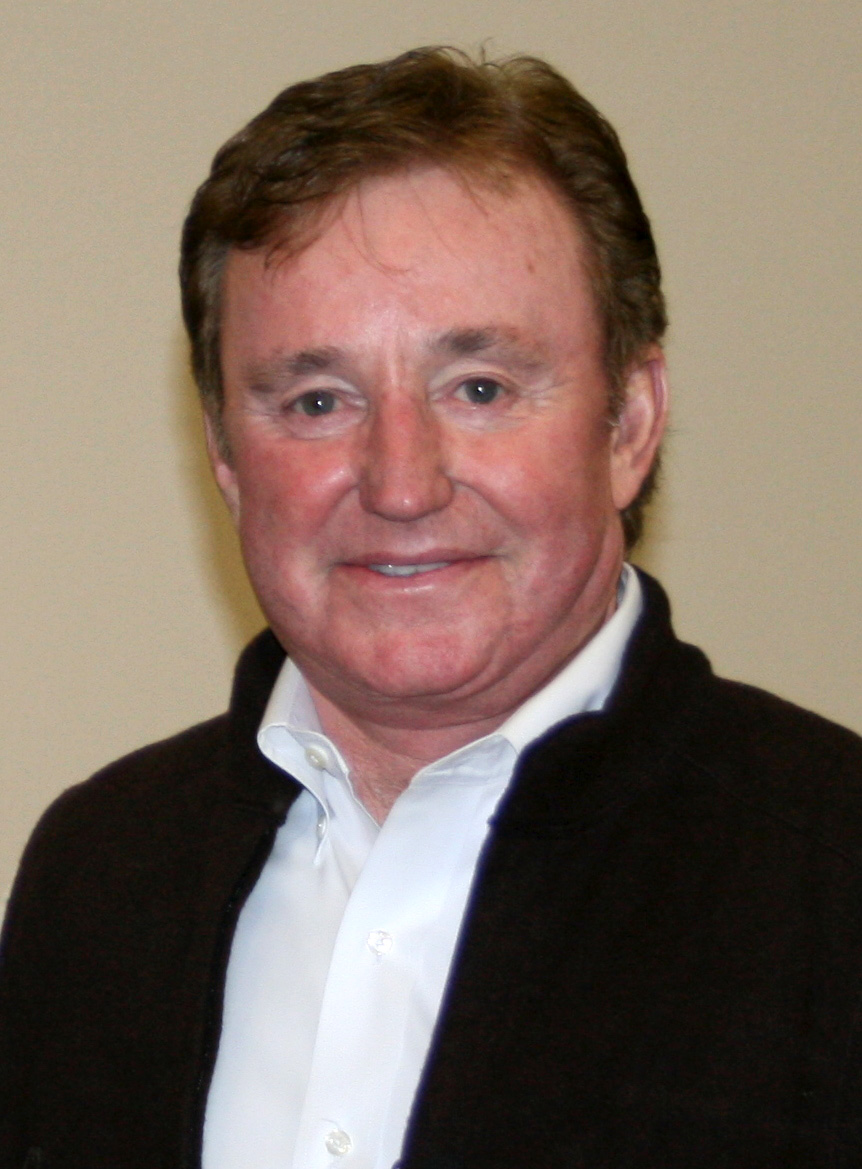
Richard Childress

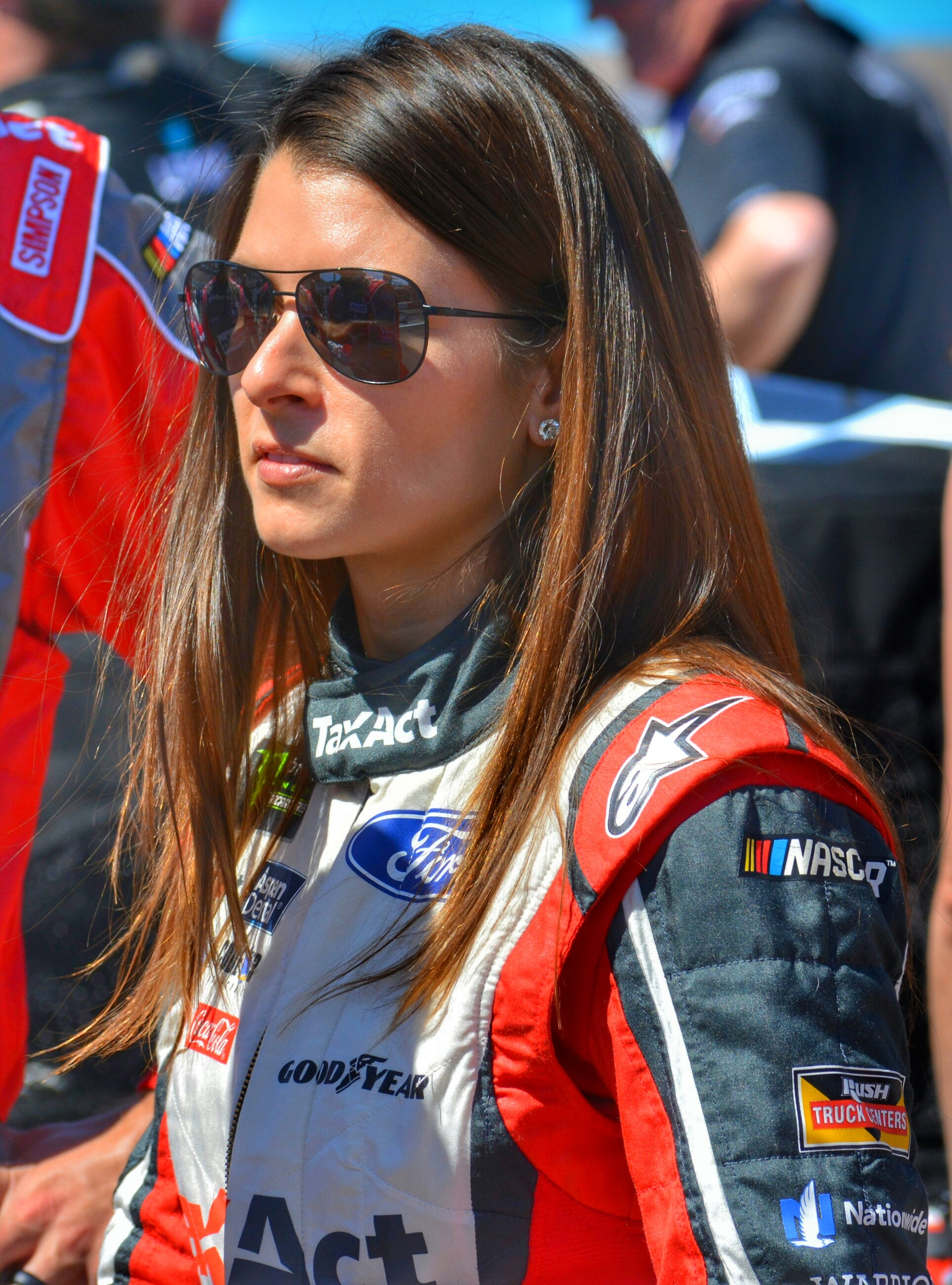
Danica Patrick

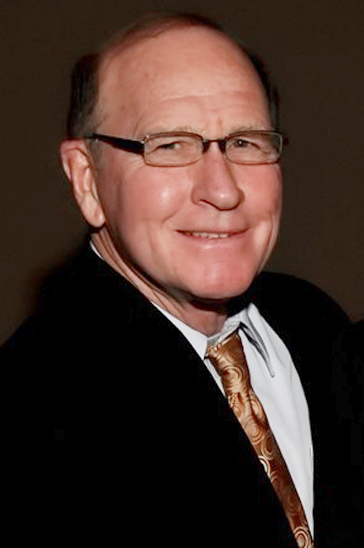
Dan Gable

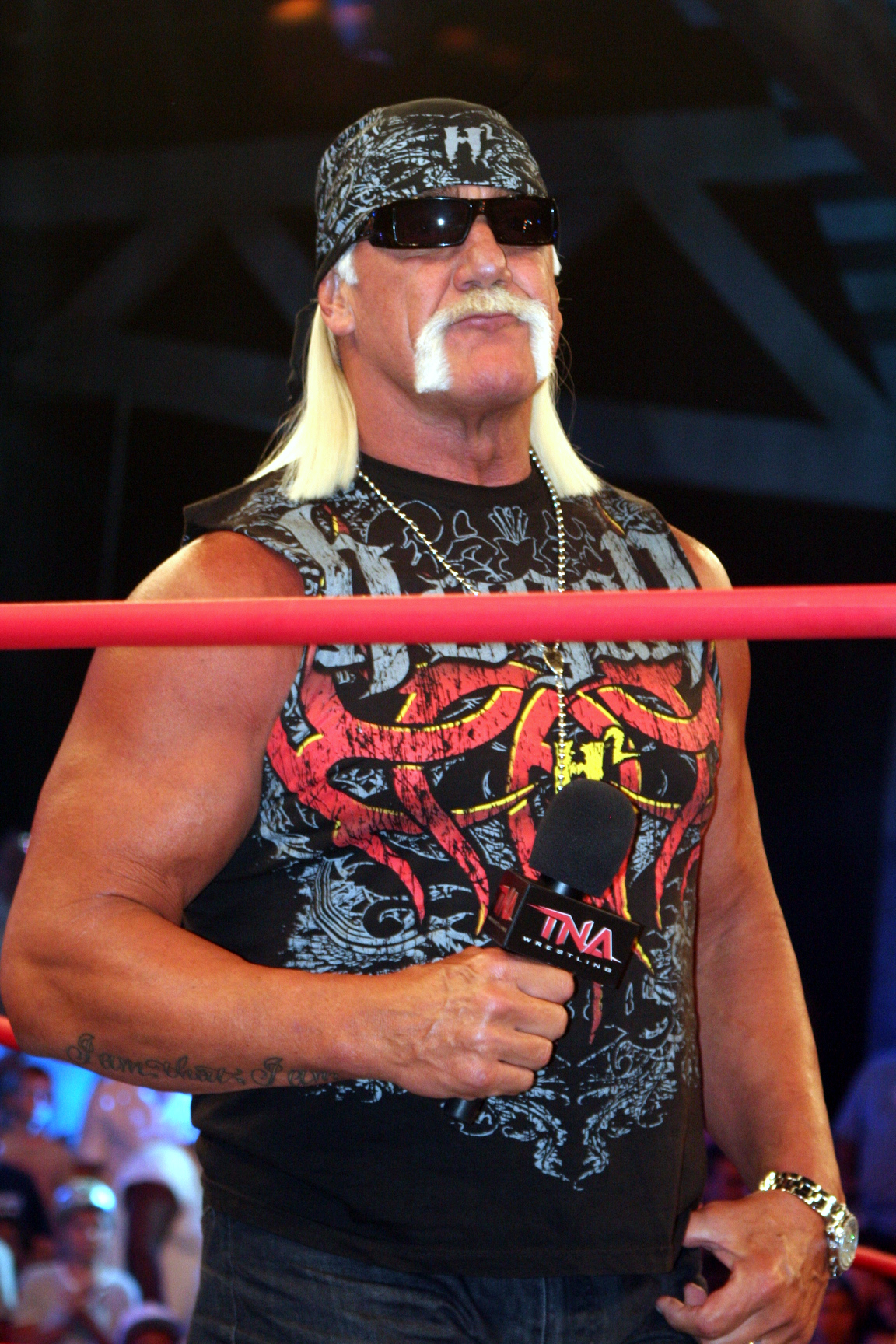
Hulk Hogan

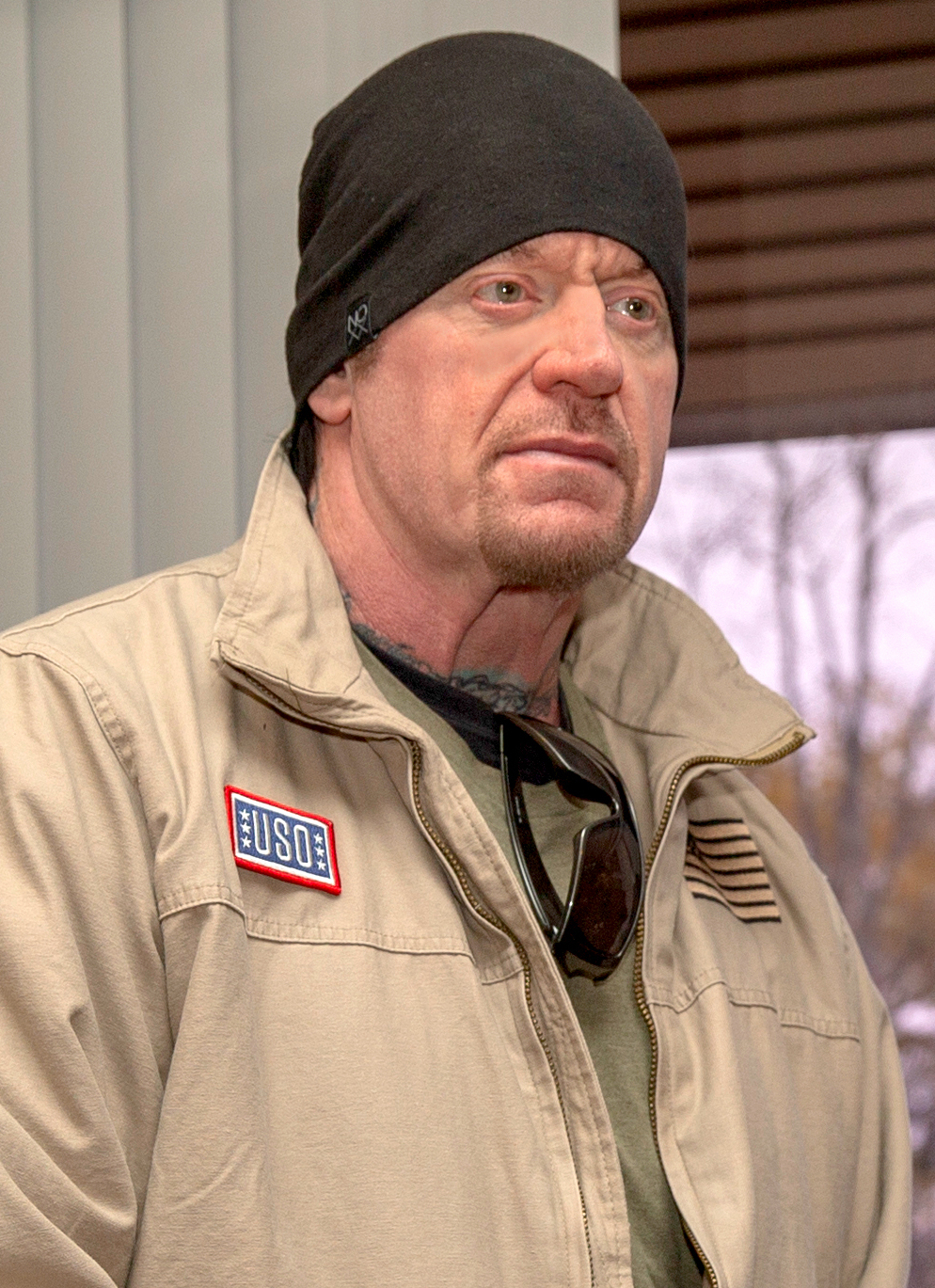
The Undertaker

=== American football ===
- Ottis Anderson, former NFL running back
- Alex Bachman, NFL wide receiver
- Budda Baker, football player
- Bill Belichick, former NFL coach
- Le'Veon Bell, former NFL running back
- Rita Benson LeBlanc, former vice chairman of the board of the New Orleans Saints
- Jake Bequette, former NFL defensive end and Republican candidate for U.S. Senate from Arkansas in 2022
- Nick Bosa, NFL defensive end
- Jack Brewer, former NFL defensive back
- Wesley Britt, former NFL tackle
- Antonio Brown, former NFL wide receiver
- Spencer Brown, football player
- Harrison Butker, NFL kicker
- Kirk Cousins, NFL quarterback
- Maxx Crosby, NFL defensive end
- Jerone Davison, former NFL running back
- A. J. Dillon, NFL running back
- Tommy Doyle, football player
- John Elway, former NFL quarterback
- Boomer Esiason, former NFL quarterback
- Quinn Ewers, quarterback for the Texas Longhorns
- Brett Favre, former NFL quarterback
- Jay Feely, former NFL placekicker
- Jon Feliciano, NFL guard
- Blake Ferguson, NFL long snapper
- Wallace Gilberry, former NFL defensive end
- Jon Gruden, former NFL head coach
- John Harbaugh, head coach for the Baltimore Ravens
- Taylor Heinicke, NFL quarterback
- Bo Hines, former college football player and Republican nominee for U.S. representative from NC-13 in 2022
- Lou Holtz, former football coach
- Richie Incognito, former NFL guard
- Chris Jacke, NFL placekicker
- Adam Jones, former NFL cornerback
- Dalton Kincaid, NFL tight end
- Jack Lambert, former NFL linebacker
- Nick Mangold, former NFL center
- Arch Manning, quarterback for the Texas Longhorns
- Jonathan Martin, former NFL offensive tackle
- Sam Martin, NFL punter
- Shawne Merriman, former NFL linebacker
- Gardner Minshew, NFL quarterback
- Maurkice Pouncey, football player
- Mike Pouncey, football player
- Tony Romo, former NFL quarterback and current NFL commentator for CBS
- Mike Shula, quarterbacks coach for the Denver Broncos
- Lawrence Taylor, former NFL linebacker
- Tim Tebow, former NFL quarterback
- Brian Urlacher, former NFL linebacker
- Ryan Van Demark, football player
- Mike Wallace, former NFL wide receiver
- James Winchester, NFL long snapper
- Derek Wolfe, former NFL defensive end

=== Baseball ===
- Blaze Alexander, MLB infielder
- Roger Clemens, former MLB pitcher
- Roberto Clemente Jr., former professional baseball player
- Zack Cozart, former MLB shortstop
- Johnny Damon, former MLB outfielder
- Steve Garvey, baseball player
- Mark Grace, former MLB first baseman
- Mariano Rivera, former MLB pitcher
- John Rocker, former MLB pitcher
- Curt Schilling, former MLB pitcher
- Darryl Strawberry, former MLB outfielder
- Mark Teixeira, former MLB infielder
- Ryan Thompson, MLB pitcher
- Blake Treinen, MLB pitcher
- David Wells, former MLB pitcher

=== Basketball ===
- Tom Chambers, former NBA player
- Enes Kanter Freedom, basketball player
- Jonathan Isaac, current NBA player
- Lamar Odom, former NBA player
- Bruce Pearl, college basketball coach
- Tristan Thompson, basketball player
- Royce White, former NBA player, mixed martial artist, and Republican nominee for U.S. Senate from Minnesota in 2024

=== Boxing ===
- Ryan Garcia, professional boxer
- Evander Holyfield, professional boxer
- Floyd Mayweather Jr., professional boxer
- Mike Tyson, professional boxer

=== Golf ===
- Sam Burns, professional golfer
- Brandel Chamblee, professional golfer
- John Daly, professional golfer
- Bryson DeChambeau, professional golfer
- Dustin Johnson, professional golfer
- Anthony Kim, professional golfer
- Nelly Korda, professional golfer
- Phil Mickelson, professional golfer
- Jack Nicklaus, former professional golfer
- Pat Perez, professional golfer
- Annika Sörenstam, former professional golfer

=== Gymnastics ===
- Nastia Liukin, former gymnast
- MyKayla Skinner, former gymnast

=== Ice hockey ===
- Tony DeAngelo, professional ice hockey player
- Jack Eichel, NHL center for the Vegas Golden Knights
- Jeremy Roenick, former professional ice hockey player
- Matthew Tkachuk, NHL winger for the Florida Panthers

=== Mixed martial arts ===
- Sam Alvey, professional mixed martial artist
- Derek Brunson, professional mixed martial artist
- Michael Chandler, professional mixed martial artist
- Michael Chiesa, professional mixed martial artist
- Randy Costa, professional mixed martial artist
- Colby Covington, professional mixed martial artist
- Dillon Danis, former professional mixed martial artist
- Beneil Dariush, professional mixed martial artist
- Cody Durden, professional mixed martial artist
- Justin Gaethje, professional mixed martial artist
- Jon Jones, professional mixed martial artist
- Tim Kennedy, former professional mixed martial artist
- Brad Kohler, former professional mixed martial artist
- Nik Lentz, former professional mixed martial artist
- Jorge Masvidal, former professional mixed martial artist
- Mike Perry, professional mixed martial artist
- Aljamain Sterling, professional mixed martial artist
- Sean Strickland, professional mixed martial artist
- Kamaru Usman, mixed martial artist

=== Motorsports ===
- Mario Andretti, former racing driver
- Trevor Bayne, former NASCAR driver
- Greg Biffle, former NASCAR driver
- Chase Briscoe, current NASCAR driver
- Zak Brown, racing driver and businessman
- Richard Childress, former NASCAR driver and owner of Richard Childress Racing
- Austin Dillon, current NASCAR driver
- Ty Gibbs, current NASCAR driver
- Noah Gragson, current NASCAR driver
- Rick Hendrick, racing driver and team owner
- Austin Hill, current NASCAR driver
- Carl Long, professional stock car racing driver and owner of MBM Motorsports
- Jeremy McGrath, professional motocross and supercross racer
- Danica Patrick, former professional racing driver
- Roger Penske, former professional racing driver and owner of Team Penske, the Indianapolis Motor Speedway, and IndyCar
- Kyle Petty, former NASCAR driver
- Richard Petty, former NASCAR driver
- Graham Rahal, current IndyCar driver
- Zane Smith, NASCAR driver
- Ricky Stenhouse Jr., NASCAR driver
- Tim Viens, professional stock car racing driver
- Kenny Wallace, former NASCAR driver

=== Skateboarding ===
- Jereme Rogers, former professional skateboarder and rapper
- Henry Sanchez, former professional skateboarder
- Ryan Sheckler, professional skateboarder
- Danny Way, professional skateboarder

=== Soccer ===
- Alexi Lalas, former MLS player
- Brittany Mahomes, former soccer player, founding co-owner of the Kansas City Current
- Justin Meram, professional soccer player

=== Surfing ===
- Bethany Hamilton, professional surfer
- Bruce Irons, professional surfer
- Kai Lenny, professional surfer
- Kelly Slater, professional surfer
- Moana Jones Wong, professional surfer

=== Wrestling ===
- Ben Askren, wrestler and mixed martial artist
- Henry Cejudo, Olympic medalist in freestyle wrestling and retired mixed martial artist
- Eugene, former professional wrestler
- Ric Flair, professional wrestler
- Dan Gable, wrestler and coach
- Jake Hager, professional wrestler and retired mixed martial artist
- Hulk Hogan, former professional wrestler
- Bo Nickal, wrestler and professional mixed martial artist
- Zain Retherford, freestyle wrestler
- Ryback, former professional wrestler
- Tatanka, professional wrestler
- The Undertaker, former professional wrestler

=== Other ===
- Lanny Barnes, biathlete
- Phil Hellmuth, professional poker player
- Kaillie Humphries, bobsledder
- Brad Snyder, swimmer
- Abbie Stockard, Miss Alabama 2024 winner
- Jordan Stolz, speed skater
- Inga Thompson, cyclist
- Caitlin Upton, former Miss Teen USA

== Writers ==
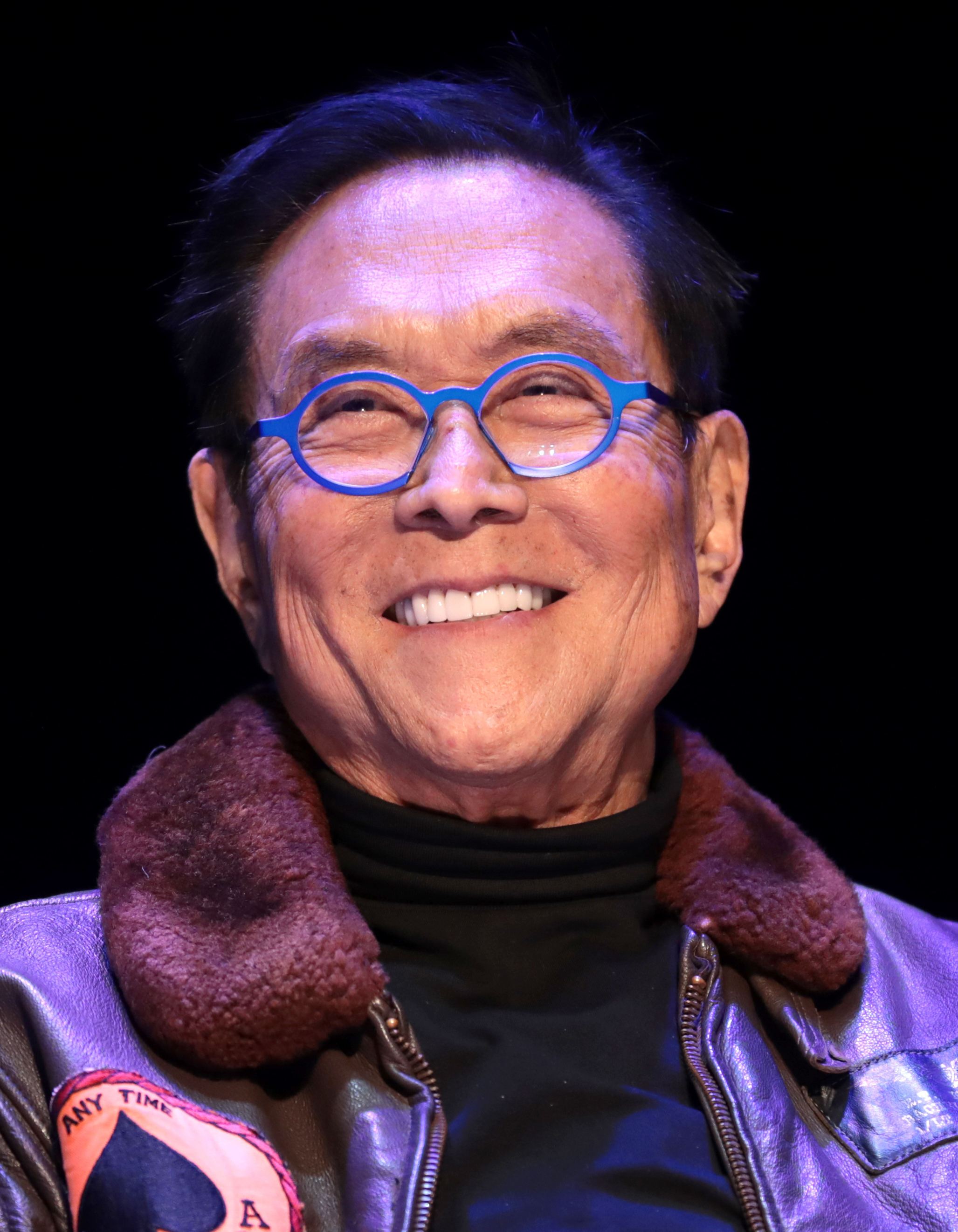
Robert Kiyosaki

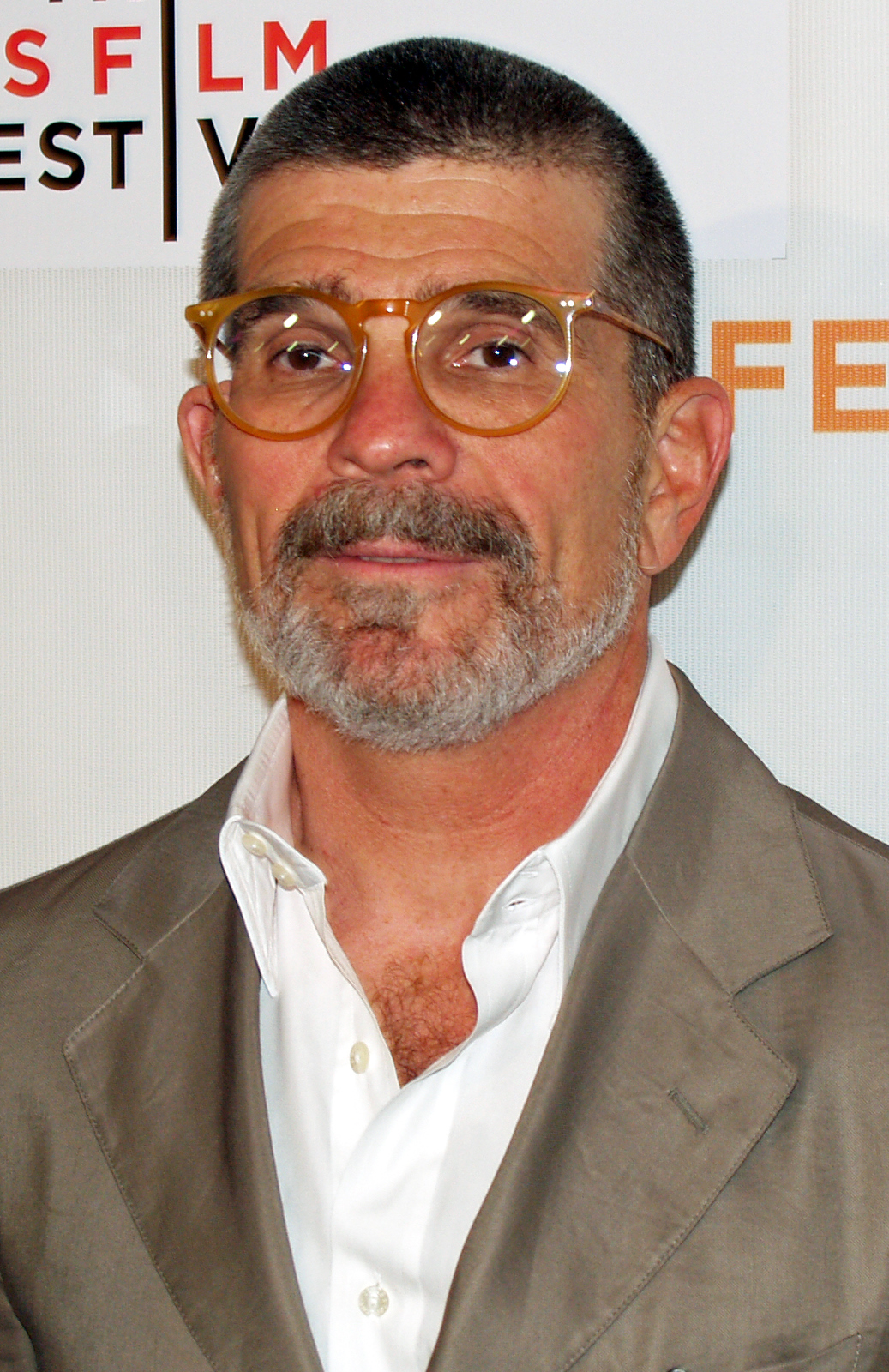
David Mamet

- Scott Adams, cartoonist and author
- Sohrab Ahmari, writer and journalist
- Raymond Arroyo, author, journalist, and producer
- Skip Bayless, sports columnist and commentator
- Alex Berenson, writer
- Deneen Borelli, journalist
- David Brody, journalist
- Eric Bolling, journalist and political commentator
- Cara Castronuova, White House correspondent and investigative journalist
- Rod Dreher, journalist
- Martin Gurri, CIA analyst and writer
- Jacob Helberg, author and entrepreneur
- Stella Inger, journalist
- Drew Johnson, journalist
- Robert Kiyosaki, author of Rich Dad Poor Dad
- Greg Laurie, author and pastor
- Scott LoBaido, artist
- Jeffrey Lord, author and commentator
- Gina Loudon, conservative author, anchor, columnist, show host, and news commentator
- David Mamet, playwright, author, and filmmaker
- Jenny Beth Martin, journalist and political founder
- Morgan Murphy, author and press secretary
- Katie Pavlich, journalist
- Andrea Peyser, columnist
- Elizabeth Pipko, author and model
- Norman Podhoretz, writer
- Dave Ramsey, financial advisor, author and radio personality
- Hilary Geary Ross, author and philanthropist
- Lauren Sánchez, philanthropist and former journalist
- Debra Saunders, political journalist
- John Solomon, journalist and political commentator
- Clay Travis, sports journalist
- Emmett Tyrrell, editor-in-chief for The American Spectator
- Batya Ungar-Sargon, journalist and author
- Armstrong Williams, author and political commentator
- Naomi Wolf, feminist, journalist, and conspiracy theorist

== Religious figures ==
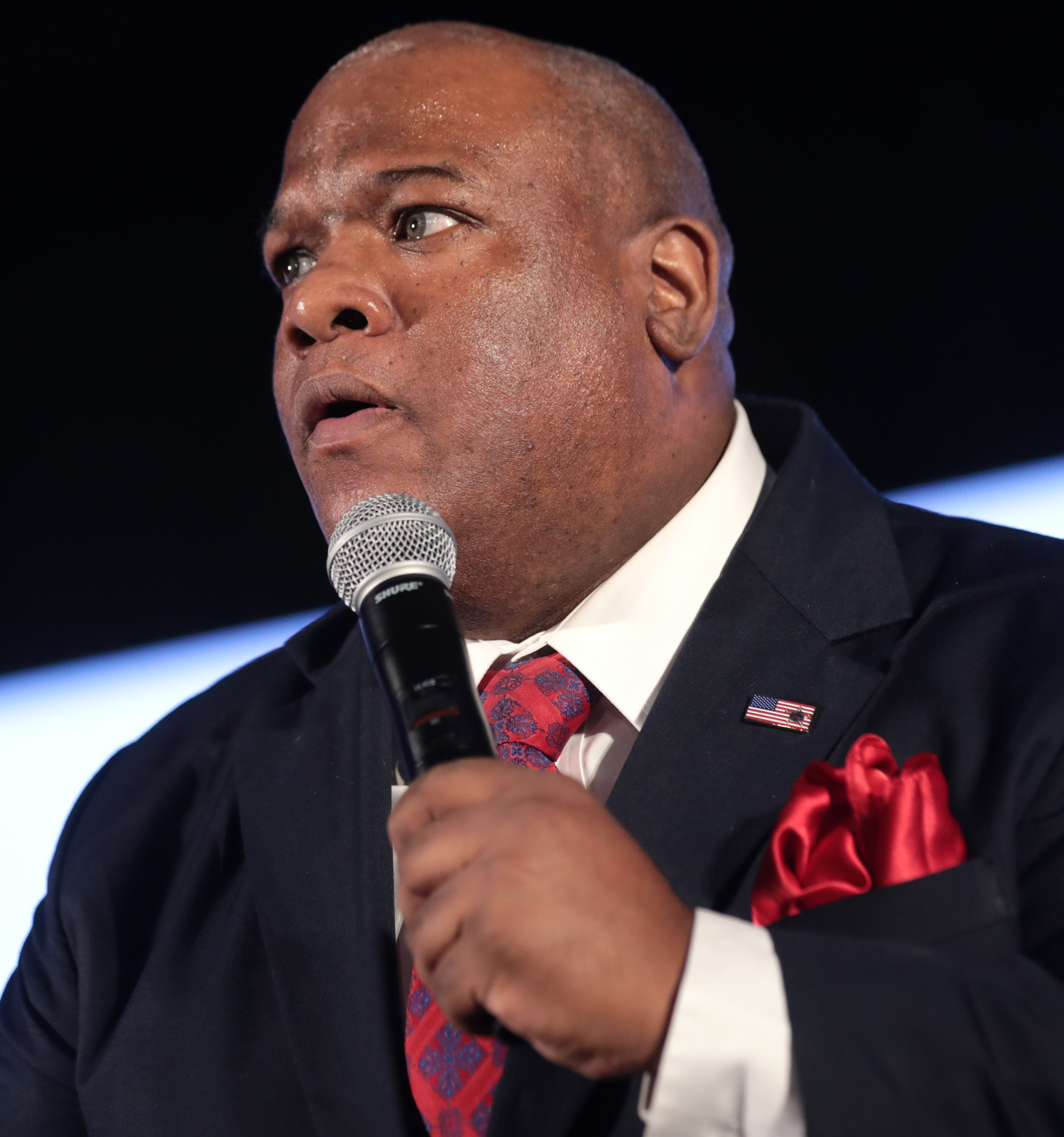
Mark Burns

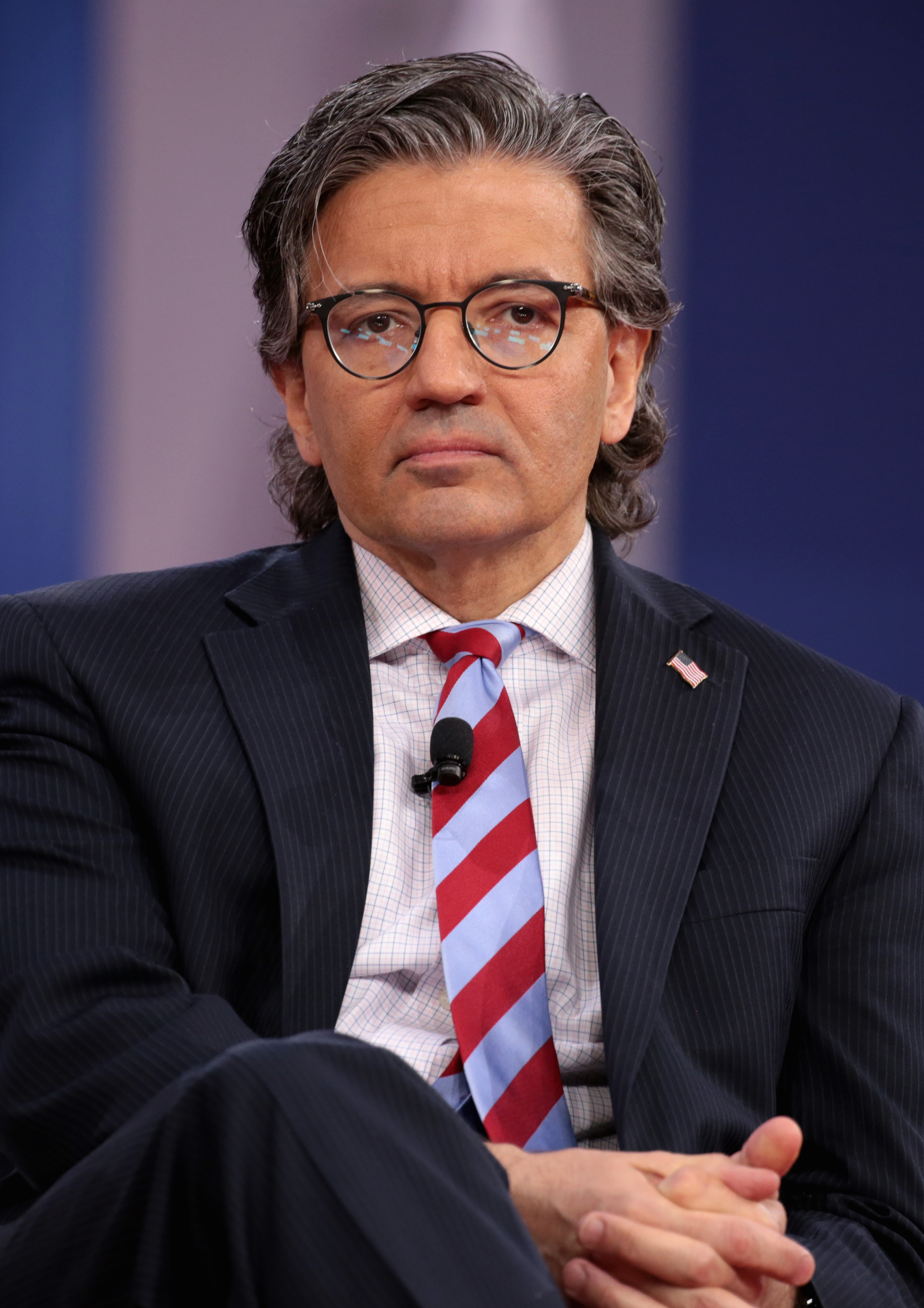
Zuhdi Jasser

- Yitzchok Adlerstein, rabbi
- Mark Burns, evangelical minister
- Kenneth Copeland, televangelist
- James Dobson, evangelical Christian psychologist and author
- Lou Engle, Charismatic Christian leader
- Jentezen Franklin, evangelical pastor, author and televangelist
- Jack Graham, Baptist minister
- E. W. Jackson, Protestant bishop and politician
- Zuhdi Jasser, doctor, Muslim activist, and commentator
- Robert Jeffress, Pastor of First Baptist Church of Dallas, Texas
- David Jeremiah, Christian author and pastor
- Shmuel Kamenetsky, Haredi rabbi
- James F. Linzey, Southern Baptist Convention minister
- Greg Locke, evangelical pastor
- John MacArthur, evangelical preacher
- Guillermo Maldonado, pastor and televangelist
- Hyung Jin Moon, religious leader
- Frank Pavone, laicized Catholic priest, anti-abortion leader
- Samuel Rodriguez, evangelist
- Darrell C. Scott, pastor, radio station owner/host and former advisor to Donald Trump
- Dutch Sheets, pastor and author
- Aaron Teitelbaum, one of the two Grand Rebbes of Satmar
- Frank Turek, Christian apologist and author (Independent)
- Lance Wallnau, preacher
- Andrew Wommack, charismatic television evangelist

== Academic figures and scholars ==
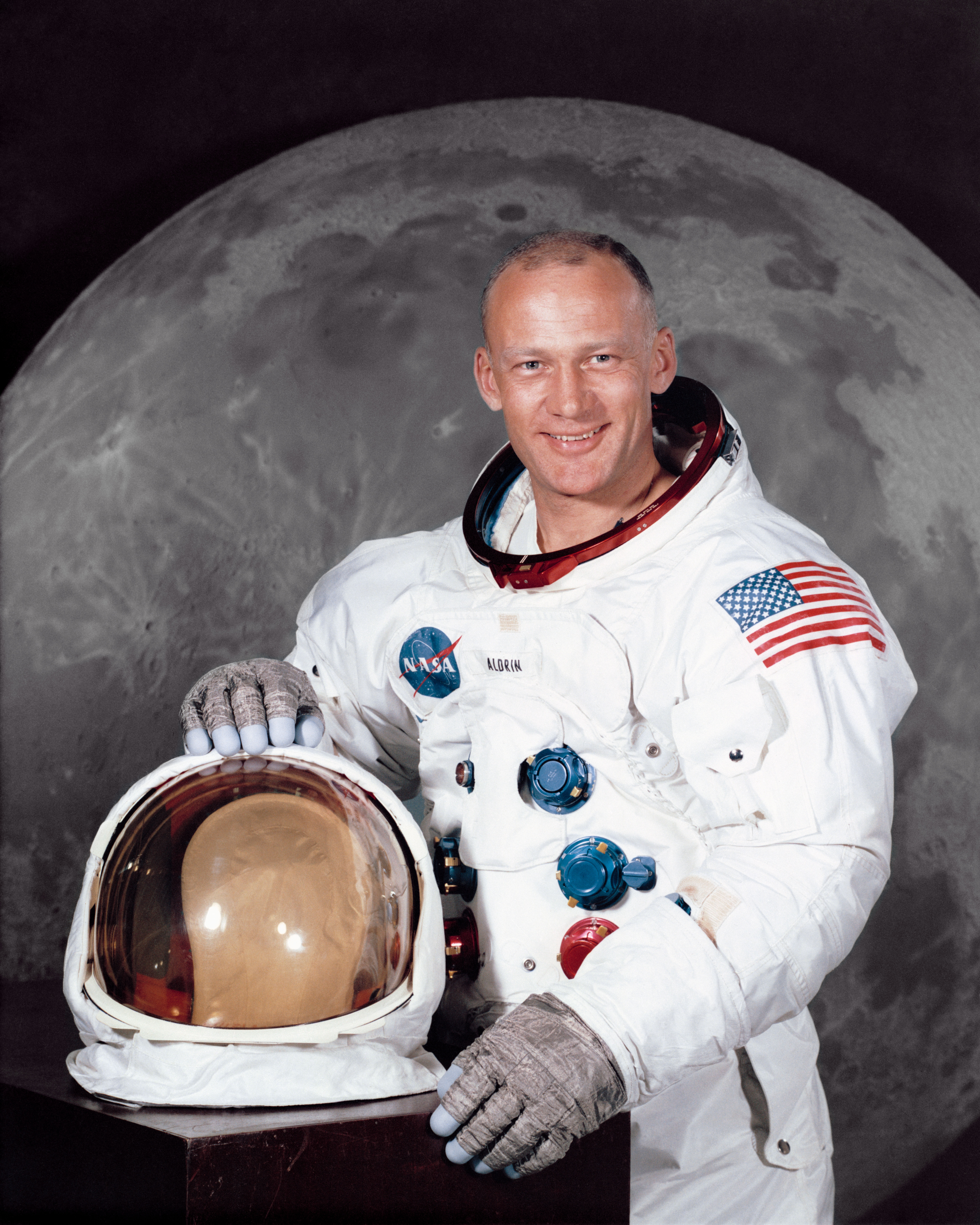
Buzz Aldrin

- Buzz Aldrin, retired NASA astronaut, scientist, and U.S. Air Force brigadier general
- A.D. Amar, management professor at the Seton Hall University
- Greg Autry, space policy expert
- Mike Belshe, computer scientist and CEO of BitGo
- Walter Block, Harold E. Wirth Eminent Scholar Endowed Chair in Economics at the School of Business at Loyola University New Orleans
- Michael Scott Doran, international politics scholar
- Diana Furchtgott-Roth, economist
- Deecy Gray, academic administrator
- Victor Davis Hanson, professor emeritus of classics at the California State University, Fresno, and the Martin and Illie Anderson Senior Fellow in classics and military history at the Stanford University's Hoover Institution
- Ivan Kanapathy, security analyst and retired U.S. Marine Corps lieutenant colonel
- Matthew Kroenig, political scientist
- Arthur Laffer, economist
- Robert W. Malone, physician and biochemist
- Robert Mercer, computer scientist and hedge fund manager
- Mark Moyar, military historian
- Michael Pillsbury, foreign policy strategist
- Everett Piper, former president of Oklahoma Wesleyan University (2002–2019)
- Amy Wax, professor of law at the University of Pennsylvania

== Lawyers ==
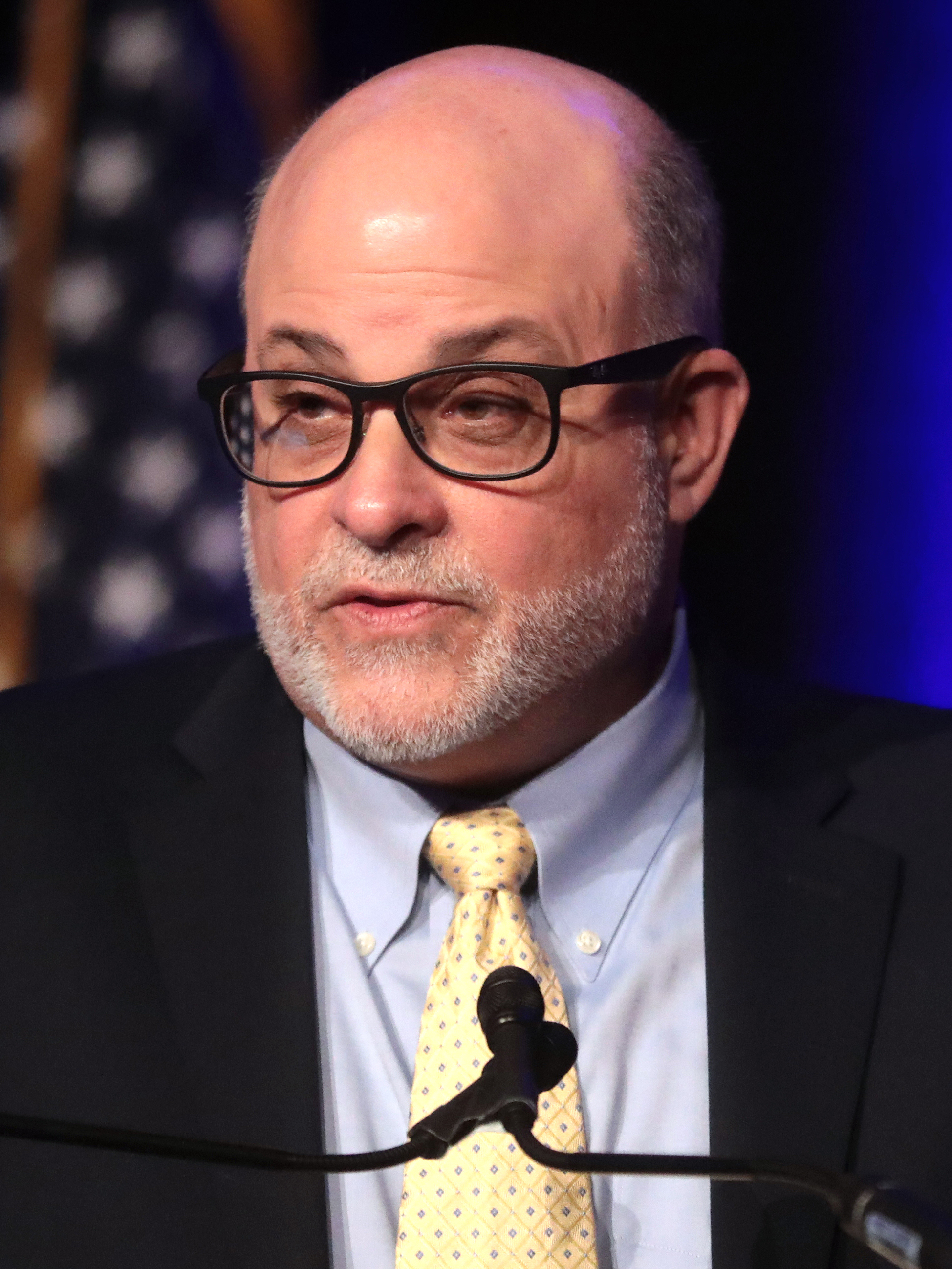
Mark Levin

- Christina Bobb, lawyer
- Bradford Cohen, lawyer (Independent)
- John Eisenberg, lawyer
- Larry Elder, talk radio host and attorney
- Jenna Ellis, lawyer
- Michael Ellis, lawyer and government official
- Boris Epshteyn, attorney and political strategist
- Brooke Goldstein, human rights lawyer
- Charles Kushner, attorney and real estate developer (father-in-law of candidate's daughter)
- Leonard Leo, lawyer
- Mark Levin, lawyer, radio and television personality
- Joseph D. McBride, lawyer
- Juan D. Reyes, lawyer
- Leo Terrell, civil rights attorney and talk radio host
- Usha Vance, attorney (running mate's wife)
- David Wasinger, attorney and political candidate
- L. Lin Wood, former attorney

== Political operatives ==
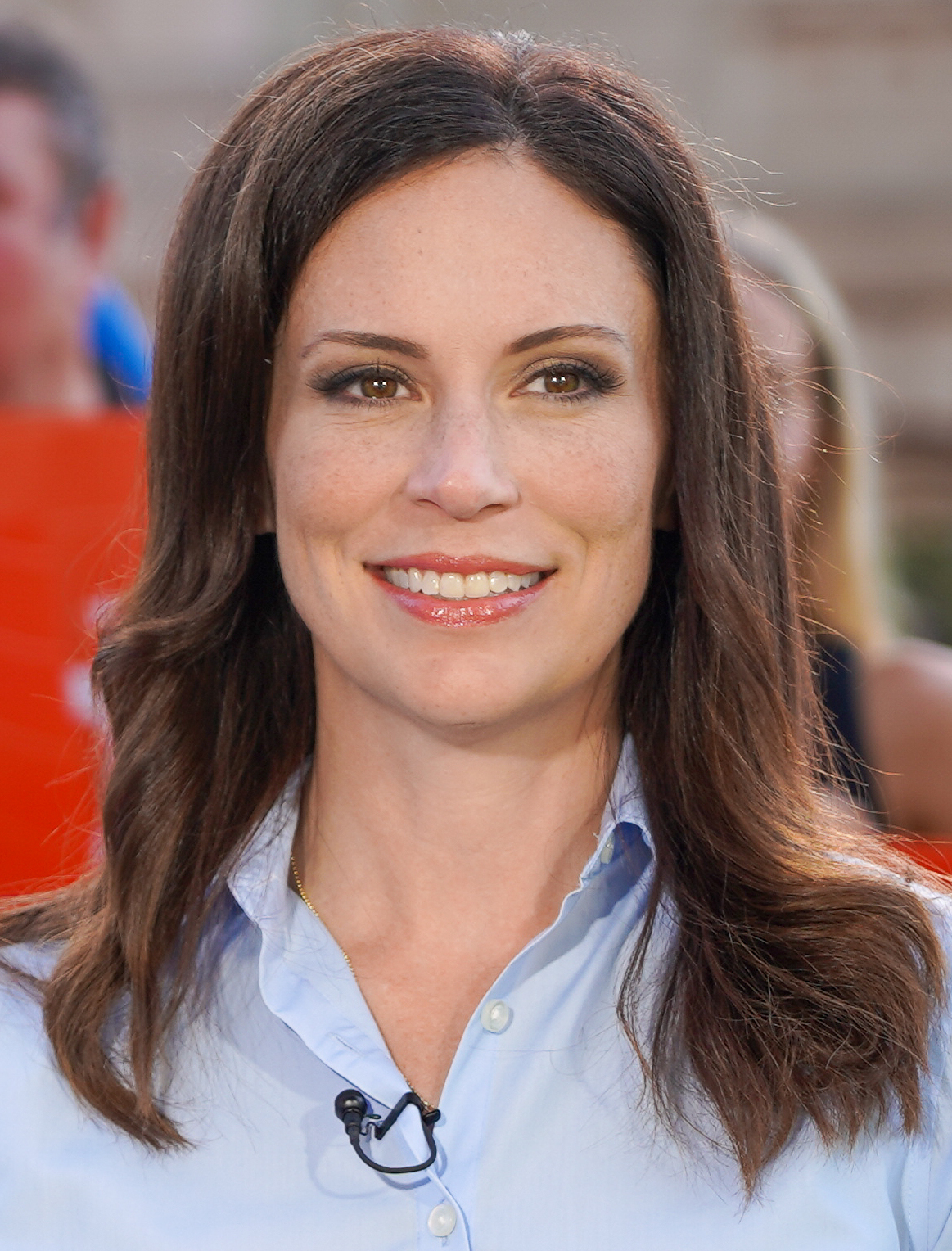
Tudor Dixon

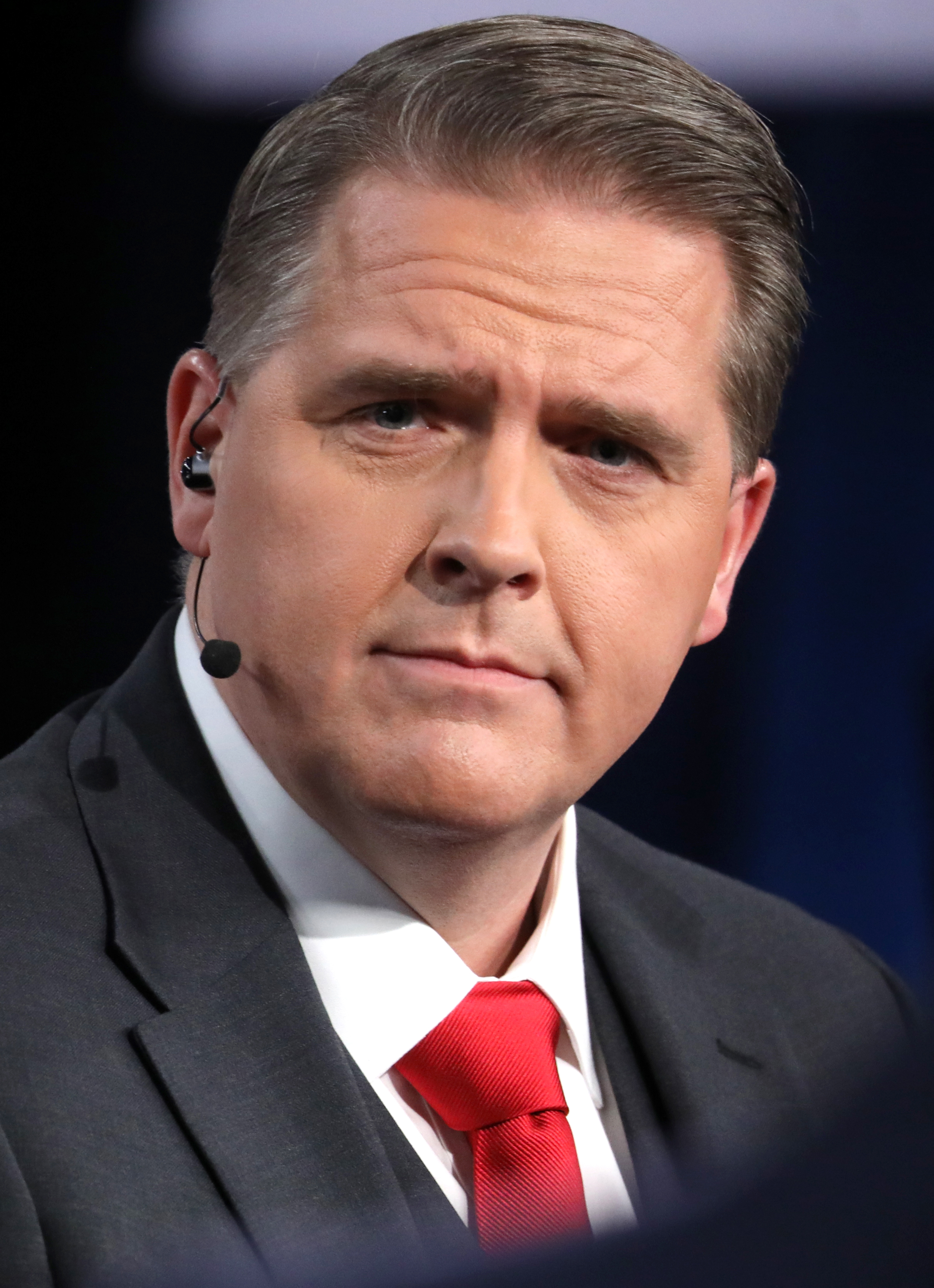
Scott Jennings

- Nick Begich III, Alaska Policy Forum board member and Republican candidate for AK-AL in 2024
- Martha Boneta, policy advisor
- John Brabender, politician
- Eric Branstad, political consultant
- Steven Cheung, Republican political operative
- Cesar Conda, political consultant
- Phil Cox, political operative
- Armand D'Amato, politician
- Paul Dans, politician and political operative
- Tudor Dixon, politician and commentator
- Tony Fabrizio, pollster
- Harrison Floyd, politician
- Lou Gargiulo, politician
- Andrew Giuliani, politician and Trump aide
- Abraham Hamadeh, politician and prosecutor
- Natalie Harp, Trump aide
- Scott Jennings, political strategist
- Kimberly Klacik, politician
- Chris LaCivita, political consultant
- Karoline Leavitt, political adviser
- Corey Lewandowski, political operative and commentator
- Meshawn Maddock, politician
- Paul Manafort, political consultant
- Jason Miller, political adviser and CEO
- Walt Nauta, political aide
- Brad Parscale, former Trump campaign manager
- Ivan Raiklin, political operative
- Gayle Ruzicka, politician
- Craig Shirley, political consultant and authort
- Roger Stone, political consultant and lobbyist
- Caroline Sunshine, political aide and former actress
- Bob Vander Plaats, politician and conservative activist
- Kenneth R. Weinstein, government official and writer
- Frank Wuco, politician

== Activists ==
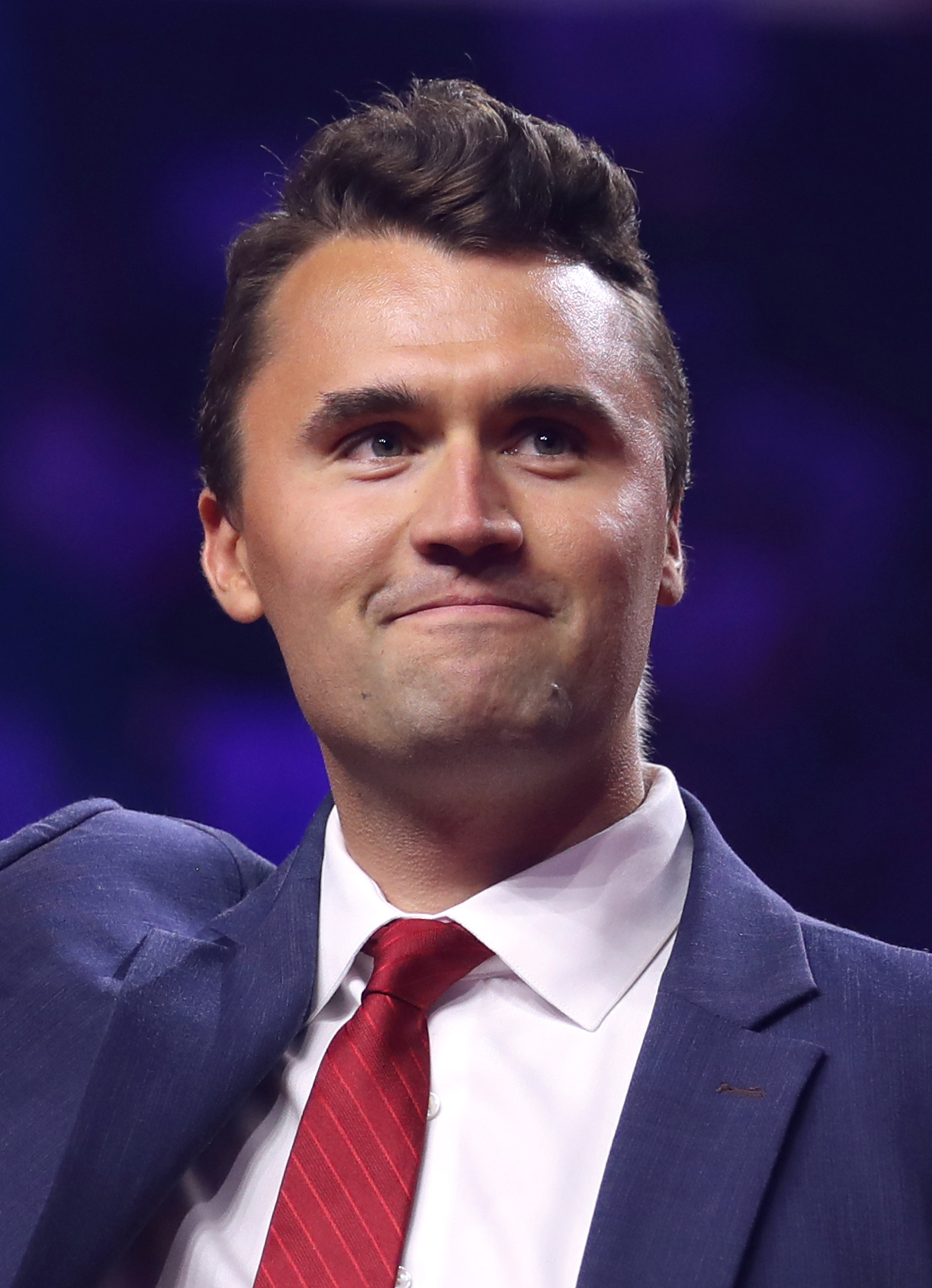
Charlie Kirk

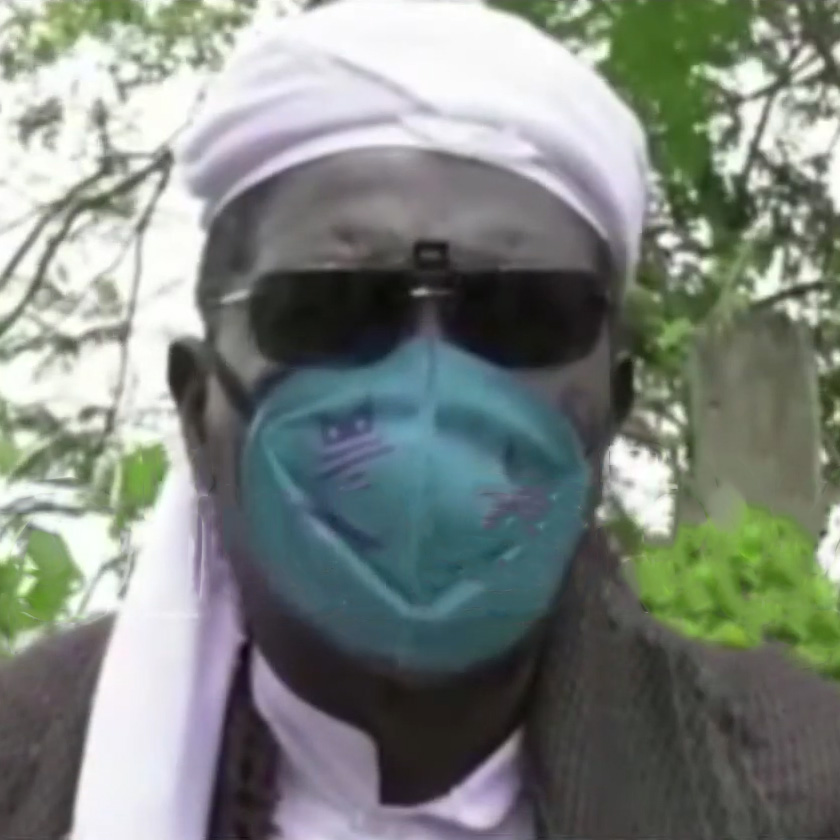
Malik Obama

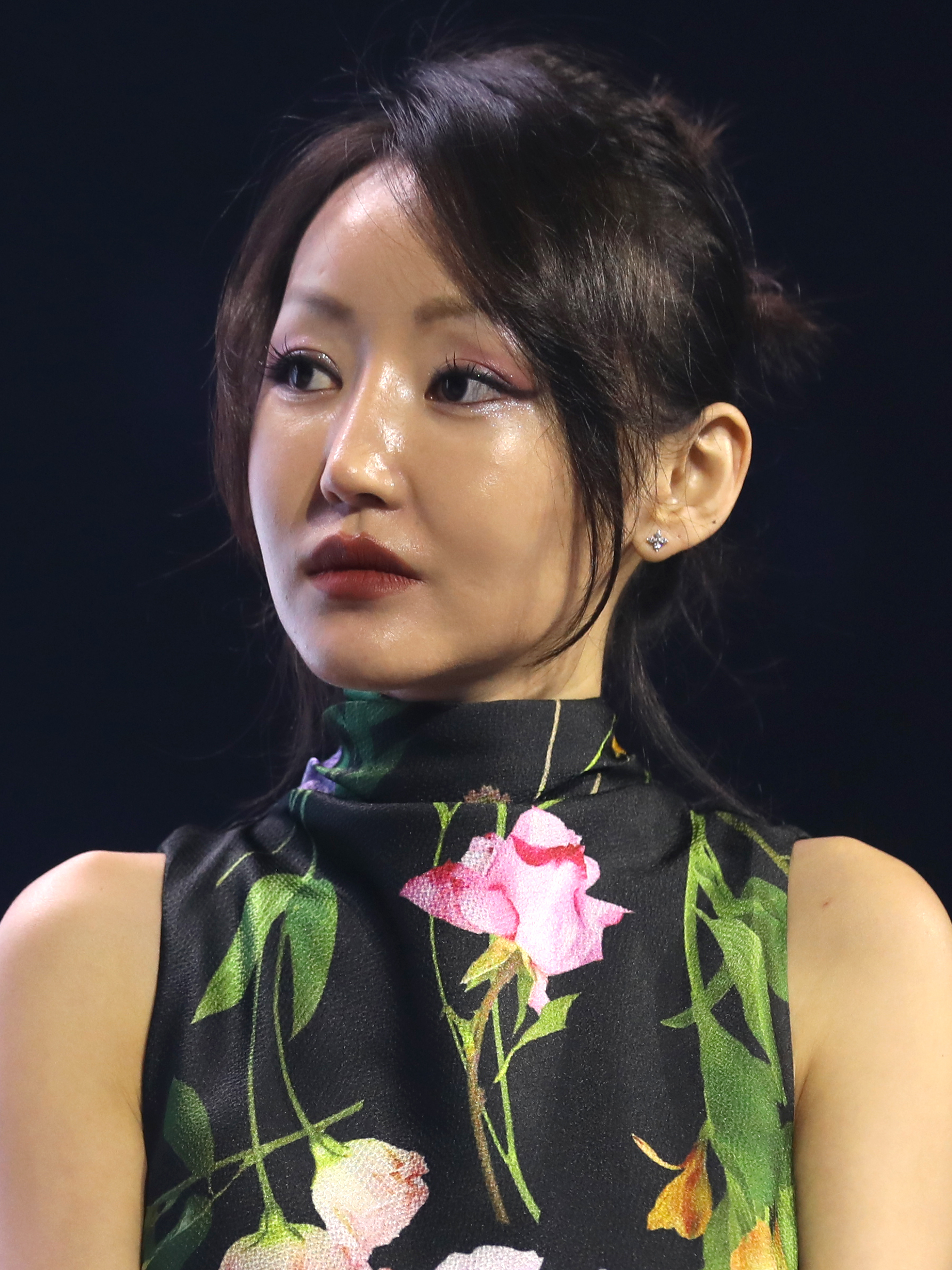
Yeonmi Park

- David Barton, political activist and author
- Joe Biggs, seditionist
- Juanita Broaddrick, nursing home administrator and political activist
- Jon Caldara, libertarian activist
- Jacob Chansley, QAnon and January 6 Capitol attack figure (Libertarian)
- Chloe Cole, activist
- Ann Coulter, political activist
- Marjorie Dannenfelser, president of Susan B. Anthony Pro-Life America
- Steve Deace, conservative activist
- Myron Ebell, climate change denier
- Brigitte Gabriel, activist
- Riley Gaines, conservative activist and former swimmer
- Brandon Gill, conservative news website founder and Republican nominee for TX-26 in 2024
- Alan Gottlieb, conservative activist and gun rights advocate
- Kristan Hawkins, president of anti-abortion organization
- Alice Marie Johnson, criminal-justice activist and commuted convict
- Charlie Kirk, political activist
- Lars Larson, radio host
- Laura Loomer, political activist
- Michael the Black Man, political figure
- Blake Marnell, political activist
- Malik Obama, Barack Obama's half brother
- Alexander Otaola, political activist and humorist
- Yeonmi Park, North Korean defector and activist
- Star Parker, conservative activist, columnist, and congressional candidate
- Janet Parshall, radio host
- Solomon Peña, orchestrator of shootings at political opponents
- Jack Posobiec, alt-right activist and conspiracy theorist
- Dennis Prager, conservative activist
- Scott Presler, conservative activist
- Stewart Rhodes, Oath Keepers leader and seditionist
- Kyle Rittenhouse, perpetrator of the Kenosha unrest shooting
- Lila Rose, anti-abortion activist
- Ned Ryun, alt-right activist
- Robby Starbuck, activist and music video director
- Richard Viguerie, chair of ConservativeHQ.com
- Lauren Witzke, far-right political activist political candidate

== See also ==
- List of Kamala Harris 2024 presidential campaign non-political endorsements
- List of Donald Trump 2024 presidential campaign endorsements
