= Juniper (disambiguation) =

The juniper (Juniperus) is a type of shrub and tree in the cypress family.

Juniper may also refer to:

== Places ==
=== Canada ===
- Juniper, New Brunswick, a hamlet
- Juniper Lake (Nova Scotia), several lakes in Nova Scotia
- Juniper Island, Ontario

=== England ===
- Juniper, Northumberland, a hamlet

=== United States ===
- Juniper, Georgia, an unincorporated community
- Juniper Cove, a cove within Salem, Massachusetts
- Fort Juniper, a fort that existed from 1775 in Salem, Massachusetts
- Juniper, a place in Munising Township, Michigan
- Juniper Springs, Nevada, also called Juniper, a former mining camp
- Juniper Island (Lake Champlain), Vermont
- Juniper Lake (Lassen Peak), Lassen Volcanic National Park, California
- Juniper Springs, a natural spring in Ocala National Forest, Florida
- Juniper Swamp, Middle Village, Queens, New York City, filled in c. 1915

== Arts and entertainment ==
- Junior Juniper, a Marvel Comics character
- Juniper (band), an Irish rock band (1991–1998)
- The Junipers, an English psychedelic pop band (2000–2013)
- Juniper (film), a 2021 New Zealand comedy-drama
- Juniper, a young adult novel by Monica Furlong
- Juniper (Joy Crookes album), the second studio album by British singer-songwriter Joy Crookes

== Businesses ==
- Juniper Networks, a networking equipment company based in Sunnyvale, California, United States
- Juniper Bank, a former credit card issuer based in Delaware, United States
- Juniper Publishers, a publisher of academic journals based in Hyderabad, India
- Juniper (telehealth company)

== Maritime vessels ==
- HMT Juniper (T123), a Second World War Royal Navy minesweeping trawler
- USS Juniper (1864), a Union Navy steamer during the American Civil War
- Juniper-class USCG seagoing buoy tender
  - USCGC Juniper (WLB-201), a United States Coast Guard buoy tender
- Juniper (trimaran), a trimaran sailboat designed by Chris White Designs and sailed around the world by Henk de Velde

== People and fictional characters ==
- Juniper (friar) (died 1258), one of the original followers of Saint Francis of Assisi
- Juniper (given name), a given name, including a list of people and fictional characters with the name or variants thereof
- Junlper (also stylized JUNlPER; spelt with a lowercase L), Twitter personality
- Barrie Juniper (1932–2023), British plant scientist
- Jack Juniper (born 1986), Australian footballer
- John Juniper (1862–1885), English cricketer
- Robert Juniper (1929–2012), Australian artist
- Tony Juniper (born 1960), British environmentalist and author

== Other uses ==
- Alstom Coradia Juniper, a family of trains used on the British railway network
- Juniper Airport, a private airport near Juniper, New Brunswick, Canada
- Operation Juniper, an Indian operation during the 2017 China–India border standoff
- Juniper House, Portland Oregon, is on the U.S. National Register of Historic Places
- Juniper, a codename for the AMD/ATI R800 graphic processor
- Juniper, a codename for Tesla Model Y refresh for year 2024

== See also ==
- Juniper berry, the fruit of the juniper
- Juniper Hall, an 18th-century country house in Surrey, England
- Juniper Hall, Paddington, a heritage-listed former residence and children's home and now retail building and exhibition venue in Paddington, Sydney, New South Wales, Australia
- Juniper Hill Farm-Maxwell Evarts House, a historic estate and mansion house in Windsor, Vermont, United States
- Juniper Prairie Wilderness, a protected wilderness area in Ocala National Forest, Florida, United States
