= The Juniper Tree =

The Juniper Tree may refer to:

- The Juniper Tree (fairy tale), a fairy tale by the Brothers Grimm
  - The Juniper Tree (film), a 1990 film starring Björk
  - The Juniper Tree (opera), a 1985 opera composed by Philip Glass and Robert Moran
  - The Juniper Tree, a 1997 opera by Roderick Watkins (music) and Patricia Debney (libretto)
  - The Juniper Tree (novel), a 1985 novel by Barbara Comyns
  - "The Juniper Tree", a 2000 short science fiction story by John Kessel
- Juniper, a plant in the genus Juniperus

== See also ==
- Juniper (disambiguation)
