= Divorce Me, Darling! =

Musical written by Sandy Wilson

- Music: Sandy Wilson
- Lyrics: Sandy Wilson
- Book: Sandy Wilson
- Basis: sequel to the musical The Boy Friend
- Productions: 1965 West End

Divorce Me, Darling is a musical written by Sandy Wilson. Set 10 years after the events depicted in Wilson's much better-known The Boy Friend, it is a pastiche of 1930s musicals (in particular those of Cole Porter) rather than the "Roaring Twenties" shows (mostly early Rodgers and Hart) that inspired the earlier work.

== Productions ==
Divorce Me, Darling! was first presented at The Players' Theatre on December 9, 1964, where Wilson's The Boy Friend had first appeared. On 1 February 1965, it moved to the West End and ran for 91 performances at London's Globe Theatre. It had its U.S. premiere at the Arena Theatre, Theatre Under the Stars, Houston, Texas, in 1984. It played at the Chichester Festival Theatre in July 1997, featuring Ruthie Henshall as Polly.

It is still occasionally revived at both an amateur and professional level, sometimes on a double-bill with The Boy Friend.

== Synopsis ==
=== Prologue ===
The action takes place over two days in the summer of 1936 on the French Riviera. The characters are older versions of the characters introduced in The Boy Friend.

=== Act I ===
In Nice on the French Riviera in the foyer of the Hotel du Paradis greeted by the hotel manager Gaston singing "Here We Are In Nice Again" with an assortment of hotel guests. The three naughty wives (Dulcie, Fay, and Nancy) confess to hotel receptionist Hortense that they're on a spree after telling their French husbands that they were going to England to visit their families there. Polly, our heroine, arrives without her husband, Sir Tony, who is busy at home handling their estate. The three naughty wives reappear with giddy greetings all around. Reflecting on their dreary mates who seem more concerned with matters of business than with matters of the heart, they croon "Whatever Happened To Love?" Hortense consoles the frustrated wives and cheers them up with the news that tomorrow night an international star, the mysterious Madame K, will appear in un Grand Cabaret. The American, Bobby van Husen, enters tipsily from the bar and sings "Someone to Dance With" offering to waltz, fox-trot, tango, or rumba if only he could find a partner. Hardly recognizing each other, Bobby and Polly meet and each asks after the other's spouse. Bobby says his wife Maisie is supposedly in London seeking a husband for his older sister Hannah. Bobby and Polly plan to have dinner together. Meanwhile, Mme Dubonnet confides in Hortense that she is the mysterious entertainer Madame K; she also admits she is Polly's stepmother, married to Percy who fled to South America after losing his fortune in the stock-market crash of 1929. With the loss of their fortune and his escape to the New World, she was forced to pursue a lowly career in cabaret. She wants to keep the awful truth from Polly; she's changed her hair to blonde and her name to Mme K and expresses her hard, heart-breaking life behind the "glittering facade" of her theatrical calling in her number, "Lights! Music!"

Offstage cheering heralds the arrival of the South American nation of Monomania. Pierre, Marcel and Alphonse, the errant husbands of Nancy, Fay, and Dulcie, show up in Nice feeling like bachelors again and sing of a special girl, "Maisie," they remember from their carefree single days. Lady Brockhurst (Polly's mother-in-law) arrives with a trio of young girls dressed in hiking gear. Their anthem is "Back To Nature," urging one and all to forget the city and explore the rugged life of the great outdoors. She brings her troops to a halt and Lord Brockhurst, dressed in plus-fours, is a reluctant member of her troop—far more interested in pinching the rear than bringing it up. The troop march off in search of a spot to pitch camp, and true to form, Lord Brockhurst sneaks off in the opposite direction in pursuit of a skirt. He runs into Dulcie, Fay, and Nancy, and they agree not to snitch on one another for deserting their mates for a frolic. They sing "On The Loose."

The President of Monomania and Percy, in a tropical suit and dark glasses, greet each other as compatriots. Since they are of the same stature, Percy agrees to don a false beard and the President's uniform to take his place at the Café Pataplon gala, as the President must be elsewhere for a reason he cannot reveal. Then Percy spots a poster of Madame K and recognizes his wife Kiki (Mme Dubonnet) but with blonde hair.

Scene 3 reveals two balconies side by side. Hortense and Gaston (both of the hotel staff) are inspecting each of the suites and simultaneously come out on the balconies to glimpse of the Riviera view. Ever dedicated to their chosen professions, their duet describes their dream resort, "Paradise Hotel" as other members of the staff join in the song. They exit before Polly enters one suite, kissing the photo of her husband Sir Tony; Bobby in the other suite follows suit, kissing the photo of his Maisie. Polly goes out on her balcony, Bobby goes out on his, and he invites her over for champagne—as old friends, of course. They drink to absent mates, sing "No Harm Done," and dance a bit. She protests, saying they must say goodnight before anything silly happens. They dance a bit more from his suite to hers. He accidentally drops his scarf in her quarters. Her telephone rings; it's Sir Tony, then Bobby gets a call on his telephone; It's Maisie. In the adjoining suite Sir Tony spots the scarf. He argues with Polly as to what it's doing there. Angrily he exits to take a bath. She rushes to the balcony to tell Bobby about his scarf. His news is that Maisie's on her way up. He welcomes Maisie to the suite and pours champagne. The glass has lipstick on it. She accuses him of having a secret lover—so that's why he came to Nice! In tears she rushes out of the room. He calls for Polly from the balcony and lets her know he has made Maisie as jealous as she has made her Tony. Isn't it delicious? Soon, from inside each suite, we can hear their mates apologize for their suspicious behavior. Polly and Bobby signal each other that they've each won this round.

The next morning each couple in turn in pajamas and negligees on their respective balconies have breakfast and sing "Together Again." As the number ends the two couples spot each other. Bobby acts surprised, as does Polly. Suddenly, Bobby's older husband-hunting sister Hannah bursts in looking for her brother. Sir Tony's mum, Lady Brockhurst, still in her camping togs, looking for her son and complaining about the hotel management follows the intrusion. She seems to have set up her tent in the hotel gardens. Arguments ensue. Hannah introduces herself to Sir Freddy once she discovers he's a baronet. From the suite above, Madame K (Mme Dubonnet) complains about all the noise below. Enter valets, chambermaids, manicurists, and chefs, all squeezing into the tiny room.

Hortense and the hotel staff join in for a reprise of "Paradise Hotel" as pandemonium ends the act.

=== Act II ===
Outside the Cafe Pataplon, Hannah mentions the scarf as well as the lipstick stain on the glass and provokes another argument between each couple (Tony vs. Polly; Bobby vs. Maisie). They sing to their mates "Divorce Me, Darling." Others arrive at the cabaret discovering their mates' flirting. Husbands and wives are shocked at each other's capricious behavior accuse each other and pick up loose ends of the song.

The President (actually Percy in a false beard, the President's military uniform, and dark glasses) is ceremoniously announced as the Monomania "Anthem" is struck up by the band. Upon seeing his daughter Polly, Percy does a double-take and enters the ballroom.

Hannah laments her unattached state with "Here I Am, But Where's My Guy?" As the sibilance-challenged Sir Freddy arrives, she nabs him and sweeps him into the ballroom.

Mme Dubonnet (Madame K) confides in Hortense that if she did her nightclub act, Polly would find out that her stepmother is a lowly cabaret performer. She convinces Hortense to don a mask and go on in her place. They rehearse a brief reprise of "Lights! Music!"

Bobby and Maisie are still at odds and she's still determined to divorce him. He sings "Out Of Step" and urges her to dance. She joins him reluctantly. The manager of the Cafe Pataplon introduces the act, and Hortense, wearing a mask, goes on as Madame K singing "Fancy Forgetting" (reprise). Percy (disguised as the President) leaps up to expose the impostor. He tears off Hortense's mask and Mme Dubonnet steps in singing a line from the song. Percy is overwhelmed. She, in turn, exposes him. He's not the President of Monomania! He admits it tearing off the beard. Polly cries out "Daddy!" Lady Brockhurst and her uniformed girls march in and perform a military drill. A champagne bottle literally explodes! Someone has placed a bomb in the jereboam to kill the President of Monomania. The real President enters and commends Percy for his bravery in impersonating him and putting himself on the line. The President invites all to continue the party aboard his yacht. Percy, Mme Dubonnet, and Polly are reunited ("Together Again" (reprise)). The proper British Sir Freddy and the all-American Hannah also reunite ("You're Absolutely Me").

=== Act III ===
On board the President's yacht Polly and Tony are reunited, each apologizing for playing games and acting foolish. They are in each other's arms ("Back Where We Started"). Polly and Bobby run into each other on deck and she assures him everything is patched up between her and Tony. Maisie is approaching them as the yacht lurches and Polly stumbles into Bobby's arms. Maisie, in tears, runs off. Entertaining the President and his guests, Mme Dubonnet sings (a la Marlene Dietrich) "Blondes For Danger", warning sailors to beware of this breed ("You can make a household pet/Of a redhead or brunette... " but cautions them about the dangerous blonde). Commending Percy for his heroism, the President awards him a deed to the Monomanian Platinum Mine. Percy and Mme Dubonnet embrace.

Hannah has Sir Freddy in tow; they're to be married. Bobby is searching for Maisie. Lady Brockhurst is shocked to see her girls have traded their scouting uniforms for scanty shorts, sailor caps and tap shoes as they break into song with a trio of sailors: "Swing Time Is Here To Stay". Maisie, in an abbreviated seafaring uniform, leads the cast in the song and dance. Bobby patches things up with Maisie, supported by Polly and Tony. Suddenly Polly faints. In turn Maisie and the other girls faint as well. Their husbands come to their rescue—all delighted to discover they're all in the family way ("Divorce Me, Darling" (reprise)). "I would like to make it plain/You'll never hear me say again/Divorce me, darling!"

== Songs ==
Act I

- Overture - Orchestra
- Here We Are In Nice Again - Dulcie, Nancy, Fay, Hortense, Ensemble
- Whatever Happened To Love? - Polly, Dulcie, Nancy, Fay
- Someone To Dance With - Bobby, Ensemble
- Lights! Music! - Mme Dubonnet, Ensemble
- Maisie - Marcel, Pierre, Alphonse
- Back To Nature - Lady Brockhurst, Sir Freddy, Cecelia, Prunella, Felicity
- On The Loose - Lord Brockhurst, Dulcie, Nancy, Fay
- Paradise Hotel - Hortense, Gaston, Hotel Staff
- No Harm Done - Bobby, Polly
- Together Again - Tony, Polly, Maisie, Bobby

Act II

- Divorce Me, Darling! - Polly, Bobby, Tony, Maisie, Dulcie, Alphonse, Fay, Marcel, Nancy, Pierre
- Here Am I - Hannah
- Out Of Step - Bobby, Maisie, Ensemble
- Lights! Music! (reprise) - Mme Dubonnet, Hortense
- Fancy Forgetting (reprise) - Hortense, Mme Dubonnet
- Together Again (reprise) - Percival, Mme Dubonnet, Polly
- You're Absolutely Me - Hannah, Sir Freddy

Act III

- Back Where We Started - Polly, Tony, Dulcie, Alphonse, Fay, Marcel, Nancy, Pierre
- Blondes For Danger - Mme Dubonnet, Ensemble
- Swing Time Is Here To Stay - Maisie, Ensemble
- Divorce Me, Darling (reprise) - Ensemble
