= Knock three times =

Knock three times can refer to:

- "Knock Three Times", a 1970 song by Tony Orlando and Dawn
- Knock Three Times (album), a 1971 album by Billy "Crash" Craddock
- Knock Three Times, a 1917 novel by Marion St. John Webb
- Knock Three Times, a 1968 British television serial that featured Hattie Jacques
- A tap code or secret knock

== See also ==
- Knock Knock Knock, a 2002 EP by Hot Hot Heat
