= Dariacore =

Electronic music genre

- Other names: Hyperflip
- Stylistic origins: Hyperpop; Jersey club; mashup; nightcore; hardstyle; dubstep; complextro; future bass; YTPMV; plunderphonics
- Cultural origins: Early 2020s, United States
- Typical instruments: Digital audio workstation; sampler; synthesizer

Regional scenes
- Japan

Other topics
- Plunderphonics; Weird SoundCloud; sound collage; sampledelia

Dariacore (also known as hyperflip) is an Internet microgenre of electronic dance music originally coined and pioneered by American musician Jane Remover (under the alias "Leroy") in the early 2020s. It is characterized by a humorous tone, frantic tempo, and recognizable sampling. It is sometimes conflated as a subgenre of hyperpop.

Dariacore is a primarily sample-based genre, drawing from pop music and internet memes for its sample material, and implements aspects of various genres of EDM, such as Jersey club, dubstep, and complextro. It has a notable regional scene in Japan, where its roots can be traced back to Niconico's 音MAD (otoMAD) video editing subculture.

== Etymology ==
The term "dariacore" was first used by Jane Remover for a trilogy of albums released on SoundCloud under the alias "Leroy" in the early 2020s, with cover artwork taken from the cartoon Daria. Jane would later disavow the term, calling it "a joke that's been going on for too long". Following Jane's comments on the name dariacore, some artists would remove the hashtag from their music. The term "hyperflip" later began to see more use as an alternative.

== Characteristics ==
Dariacore is most defined by its eclectic use of samples from pop music, underground viral hits, pop culture, and internet memes, as well as its fast BPMs. The genre often incorporates vocal chops and sound effects such as car crashes, police sirens and bed squeaks. It uses bouncy, syncopated rhythms derived from Jersey club, as well as breakbeats. Pitch shifting is often incorporated, similar to another Internet-born remix microgenre, nightcore.

Leroy - "Jack'd My Swag"
A short snippet of a song from Leroy's album Grave Robbing. The song has a bouncy rhythm and hardstyle kicks, and prominently features vocal samples from "My Jeans" by Jenna Rose and "N95" by Kendrick Lamar.

Billie Bugara, a creative director at SoundCloud and the manager of Jane's label, described dariacore as "pop music on steroids in the best way possible", saying the genre revolves around "how one deconstructs pop and dance music into this amalgamation of controlled chaos". The sound design and bass drops of dubstep are also commonly present in the style. Producers in the genre often theme their branding around various pop cultural references such as cartoons and video games. Music journalist Kieran Press-Reynolds, writing for Pitchfork, highlighted a producer who themed their branding around viral 2015 Internet meme "the dress" or "computer screenshots".

=== Influences ===
Jane Remover, the genre's creator, has cited producer Vektroid, particularly her glitchy track "Sick & Panic", and the Weird SoundCloud movement as primary influences on the genre's sound. Writing for No Bells, H.D. Angel draws comparisons to the work of Kid606. The Fader's team compares it to John Oswald and the plunderphonics movement. Dariacore has also taken influence from the YTPMV community and the hyperpop scene, with dariacore sometimes being conflated as a subgenre of the latter. The genre is primarily made by Generation Z individuals who grew up listening to popular EDM producers of the 2010s, such as Skrillex and Virtual Riot.

== History ==
In the early 2020s, Jane Remover released a trilogy of albums using the term "dariacore" on SoundCloud under the alias "Leroy", with cover artwork taken from the American animated television series Daria. Subsequently, other artists began to create music in the same style, birthing a microgenre. This led to some drama in the scene early on, with accusations against other artists regarding ripping off Jane's style. Jane briefly abandoned the style but would later revisit it — releasing a new album under the Leroy moniker, Grave Robbing, in 2023, and saying in a 2025 interview with Anthony Fantano that they think dariacore is "more influential than anything" and that they returned to the sound with Revengeseekerz. In 2026, Jane released the fifth Leroy album, Status Update Music.

=== Regional scenes ===
Underground musicians in Japan began to take notice of the genre over the next few years, with the country's oldest netlabel, Lost Frog Productions, releasing multiple albums based around the genre. Even as the interest in the American side of the scene began to wane, it continued to increase in popularity in Japan, though more commonly under the name hyperflip instead of dariacore. Several real life events have been organized in Japan solely based around the genre, while in the US, in-person events are much less common. Japanese hyperflip's origins can be traced back to the 音MAD remix culture of Niconico, a genre of videos using clips from different medias to create music, with Vocaloid producer Sasuke Haraguchi drawing comparisons between the two subcultures in an interview with Billboard Japan. Common sources of sampling within Japanese hyperflip tracks include anime song, j-pop, and Vocaloid music. The genre would even make its way into Konami's Bemani series of rhythm games, with the track "lowercase lifetime" in Beatmania IIDX 32 Pinky Crush.

== Influence ==
Dariacore has mostly remained underground, but has occasionally broken into the mainstream, with popular YouTuber IShowSpeed rapping over a Leroy beat, and Danny Brown and JPEGMafia taking influence from dariacore for their song "Fentanyl Tester".

British phonk music producer dashie originally produced dariacore inspired by Jane Remover.

In a 2025 Pitchfork article, music journalist Kieran Press-Reynolds cites the SoundCloud account of music archivist and curator Music Place as showcasing "Labubu-themed dariacore music". They later cited Jersey club music producers olly, haze, and alone who produced dariacore songs in an article about "The 5 Most Exciting Musical Rabbit Holes of 2025 So Far".

== See also ==
- Dismiss Yourself
