= The Boy Friend (musical) =

Musical by Sandy Wilson

- Original Broadway cast album
- Music: Sandy Wilson
- Lyrics: Sandy Wilson
- Book: Sandy Wilson
- Productions: 1953 West End; 1954 Broadway; 1970 Broadway Revival; 1971 film 1984 West End Revival; 2005 North American Tour

The Boy Friend (sometimes misrepresented The Boyfriend) is a musical by Sandy Wilson. Its original 1953 London production ran for 2,078 performances, briefly making it the third-longest running musical in West End or Broadway history (after Chu Chin Chow and Oklahoma!) until they were all surpassed by Salad Days. The Boy Friend marked Julie Andrews' American stage debut.

Set in the carefree world of the French Riviera in the Roaring Twenties, The Boy Friend is a comic pastiche of 1920s shows, in particular early Rodgers and Hart musicals such as The Girl Friend. Its relatively small cast and low cost of production makes it a continuing popular choice for amateur and student groups.

Sandy Wilson wrote a sequel to The Boy Friend. Set ten years later, and, appropriately, a pastiche of 1930s musicals, in particular those of Cole Porter, it was titled Divorce Me, Darling! and ran for 91 performances at London's old Globe Theatre in 1965. It is sometimes revived as a "double bill" with The Boy Friend.

The original score and manuscripts for the script and lyrics can be found in Wilson's archive at the Harry Ransom Center.

== Productions ==
=== London ===
The musical was first performed in London in 1953. It opened at the Players' Theatre Club on 14 April 1953, and reopened in an expanded version on 13 October. It transferred for a short season to the Embassy Theatre, Swiss Cottage and then opened at Wyndham's Theatre in the West End on 14 January 1954. Choreography was by John Heawood. The light, tuneful piece proved immensely popular with the British public, including the Queen, and ran for more than five years, a total of 2,082 performances.

The principal role of Polly Browne was to have been played by Diana Maddox, who fell ill on the afternoon of the final dress rehearsal. Anne Rogers (at that point playing a minor role) volunteered to take over, having learnt the role on her own. The show opened the following evening and made an overnight star of Rogers, who stayed with the production through its expanded versions to the triumphant West End first night at Wyndham's. The cast also included Hugh Paddick in his first leading West End role as Percival Browne, Joan Sterndale-Bennett as Madam Dubonnet, and Violetta Farjeon as Hortense.

=== Broadway ===
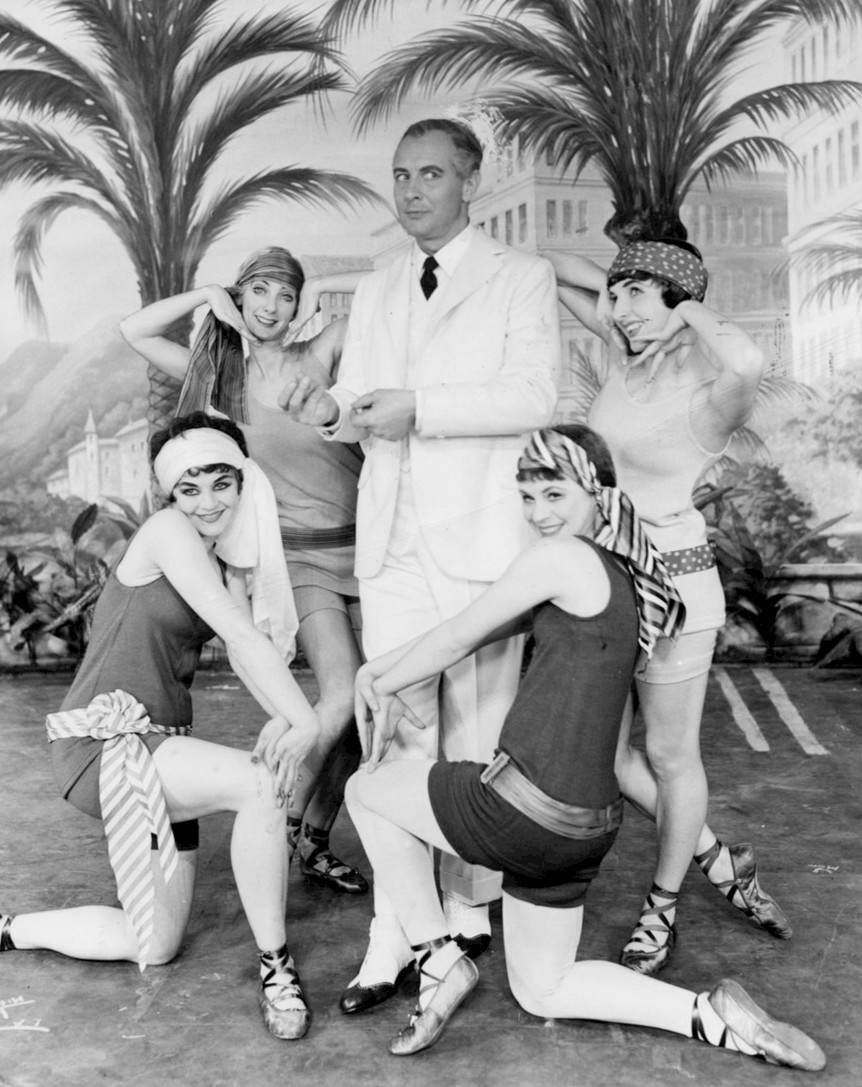
From the original Broadway production, clockwise from left: Stella Claire, Lyn Connorty, Eric Berry, Dilys Lay, Millicent Martin (1955)

The Boy Friend opened on Broadway at the Royale Theatre on 30 September 1954, and closed on 26 November 1955 after 485 performances. Starring was newcomer Julie Andrews in her Broadway debut as Polly, with a cast including Eric Berry, John Hewer, Geoffrey Hibbert, Dilys Laye, Bob Scheerer, Stella Claire, Ann Wakefield, Millicent Martin and Moyna Macgill. Some of them had connections with The Players' Theatre in London, but only Wakefield had appeared in the show's London production (in the very first run at the Players'). For the Broadway opening, veteran orchestrator Ted Royal and jazzman Charles L. Cooke contributed 1920s-style arrangements.

For her Broadway debut, Andrews received the Theatre World Award. My Fair Lady producers saw her in this piece, prompting her casting in the lead in that production, which led to her wider fame on Broadway and beyond in the following years. Jo Anne Bayless (known as Jean Bayless in London) played Polly for the final three months of the Broadway production and reprised the role on the subsequent US tour.

=== Broadway revival ===
A revival directed by Gus Schirmer opened on Broadway at the Ambassador Theatre on 14 April 1970, and ran for 111 performances. Starring were Judy Carne as Polly, Sandy Duncan as Maisie, Ronald Young as Tony, Jeanne Beauvais as Madame Dubonnet, Leon Shaw as Percival Browne, Simon McQueen as Dulcie, Harvey Evans as Bobby Van Husen, David Vaughn as Lord Brockhurst, Barbara Andres as Hortense and Marie Paxton as Lady Brockhurst. Duncan received a Drama Desk Award for Outstanding Performance and was nominated for a Tony Award for Best Actress in a Musical.

=== West End revival ===
1984 saw Cameron Macintosh's 30th anniversary production opened at The Churchill Theatre in Bromley. Directed by its creator, Sandy Wilson, it starred Glynis Johns as Madam Dubonett and Derek Waring as Percival Browne. It transferred to The Old Vic Theatre (London) then The Ed Mirvish Theatre (Toronto) before starting a West End run at The Albery Theatre in St Martins Lane. Glynis Johns was replaced by Anna Quayle when it reached the West End.

=== International productions ===
On 29 November 1967, a new production opened at the Comedy Theatre, directed by Sandy Wilson and co-produced by Michael Codron and the Yvonne Arnaud Theatre. It starred Tony Adams as Tony, Frances Barlow as Maisie, Marion Grimaldi as Mdm Dubonnet, Jeremy Hawk as Percival Browne, Geoffrey Hibbert as Lord Brockhurst, Celia Helda as Lady Brockhurst, Cheryl Kennedy as Polly Browne. It closed on 12 October 1968 after 365 performances.

In 1995, on its 40th anniversary, the musical returned to The Players' Theatre in London in a new production that was as near a reproduction of the original as possible. It was directed by Maria Charles, who had played the original Dulcie. The choreography was by Geoffrey Webb who was also in the original production. It was originally planned that the choreography would be done by Larry Drew, the original Bobby van Husen, but he died suddenly during the early planning stages of the production. Set design was by Disley Jones, who was responsible for the hat designs in the original production. Among the cast were Gemma Page, Oliver Hickey, Sophie Louise Dann and John Rutland, in his original role as Lord Brockhurst. Following its success at the Players' it went on a very successful nationwide tour.

In 2003, Julie Andrews made her directorial debut with a production of The Boy Friend at the Bay Street Theater in Sag Harbor, NY, starring Meredith Patterson as Polly Browne and Sean Palmer as Tony Brockhurst.

This production was staged at the Goodspeed Opera House, running from July 2005 through 24 September 2005. Sean Palmer returned as Tony and Jessica Grové took over the role of Polly after Meredith Patterson was unable to perform the part due to scheduling conflicts with her new role in Irving Berlin's White Christmas. Costume and scenic design were by Tony Walton, with choreography by John DeLuca. The show had two acts instead of three, and the song "Safety in Numbers" was moved from the scene on the beach to the Carnival Ball. The production then toured the United States and Canada, playing 11 cities, including Chicago, Boston, Orange County, and Toronto, from October 2005 through March 2006. The touring cast included Bethe Austin as Hortense, Paul Carlin as Percival, Andrea Chamberlain as Maisie, Drew Eshelman as Lord Brockhurst, Rick Faugno as Bobby Van Husen, Nancy Hess as Mme Dubonnet, Darcy Pulliam as Lady Brockhurst, Scott Barnhardt as Alphonse, Andrew Briedis as Pierre, Jordan Cable as Marcel, Margot de La Barre as Nancy, Pamela Otterson as Monica, Krysta Rodriguez as Fay, Eric Daniel Santagata as Phillipe, Tom Souhrada as Garcon, and Kirsten Wyatt as Dulcie.

There was an acclaimed production in 2006 at the Open Air Theatre at Regent's Park, London, which was revived during the Open Air Theatre's 2007 season.

The Boy Friend was the chosen title for the Showtime Challenge 2011 at Her Majesty's Theatre, London, produced by Eyebrow Productions. Rehearsals took place over a 48-hour period immediately prior to the performance on Sunday 8 May, and all proceeds went to The Prince's Foundation for Children and The Arts.

== Plot ==
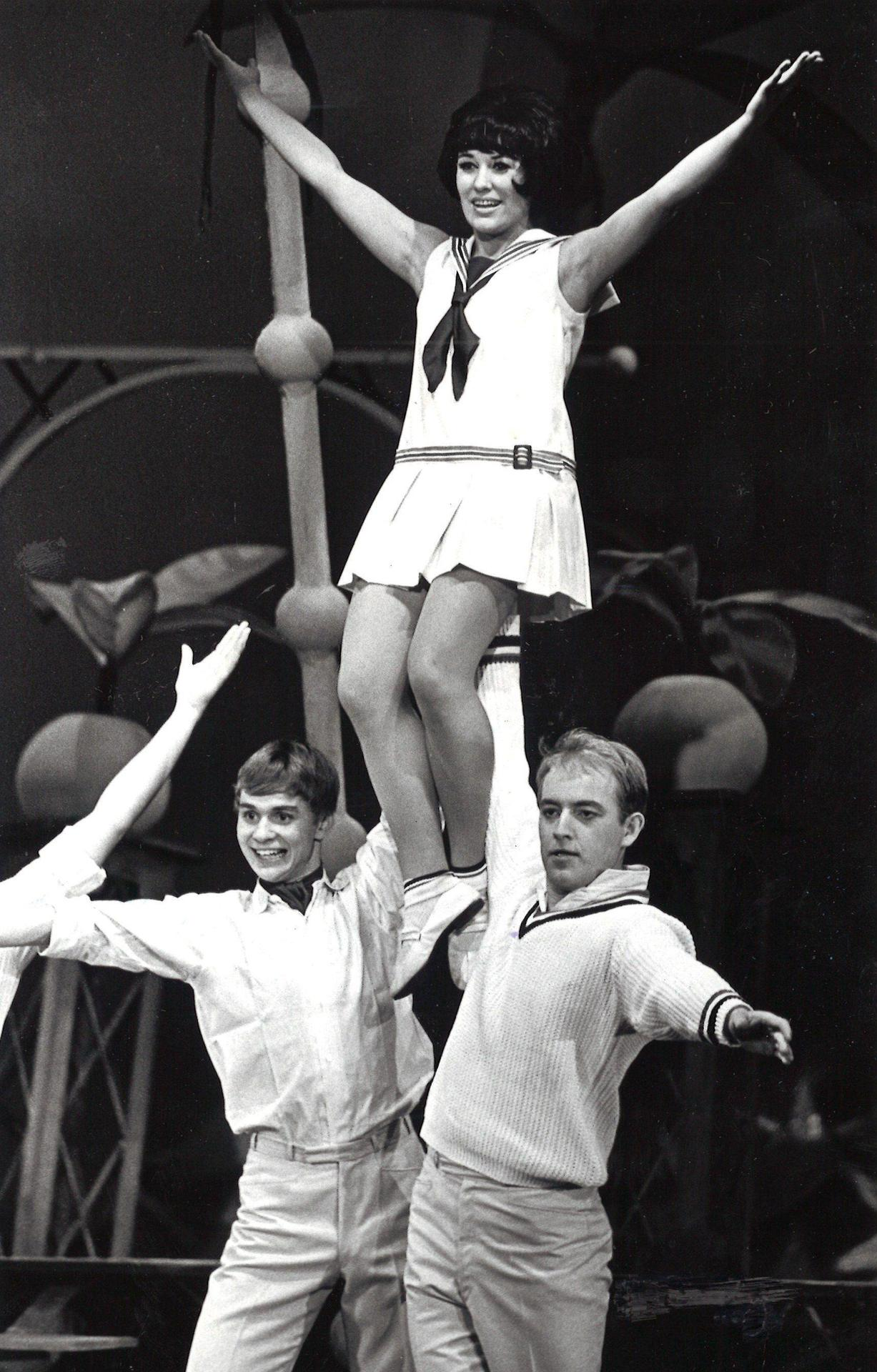
A 1965 production from Finland with Asko Sarkola, Laila Kinnunen and Göran Schauman

=== Act I ===
The whole musical is set in the Villa Caprice where Maisie, the girls (Dulcie, Nancy, Fay), Hortense the maid, and Mme Dubonnet live at Mme Dubonnet's School for Young Ladies. Act I begins when Hortense orders a costume for "a Miss Polly Browne" and Maisie and the other girls sing the ironic "Perfect Young Ladies" with Hortense. Polly arrives and tells everyone about her made-up boy friend who is "motoring down from Paris" to meet her for the upcoming carnival ball, and sings about "The Boy Friend". Later, Bobby surprises Maisie, and they dance to "Won't You Charleston With Me?"

Polly's widowed father Percival arrives at the school to discover that the headmistress, Mme Dubonnet, is an old flame of his. They sing "Fancy Forgetting" to rekindle the spark. Though Polly is a millionaire's daughter, she feels left out because she's the only one in her crowd who doesn't have a boyfriend and she needs a partner for the fancy dress ball. The errand boy, Tony, arrives to deliver her Pierrette costume and they are immediately attracted to each other and sing "I Could Be Happy With You."

=== Act II ===
The curtain opens with the chorus number "Sur la Plage". After this, Polly and Tony meet at the beach and Polly lies that she is not rich, to fit in with Tony. They sing about their future lives together in "A Room in Bloomsbury." They are about to kiss when Hortense interrupts them and is shocked to find Polly with a poor messenger boy. Polly begs Hortense to keep her secret and Hortense agrees. After Tony and Polly leave, Hortense sings how everything is "Nicer in Nice" with the ensemble. Then the "aging roué" character Lord Brockhurst arrives, leading to a comical meeting with the rigidly-mannered Percival Browne. Lord Brockhurst's domineering wife Lady Brockhurst is also introduced. Percival Browne and Mme Dubonnet then sing "The 'You-Don't-Want-To-Play-With-Me' Blues".

Polly goes to meet Tony on the promenade just as Lord and Lady Brockhurst are passing by, and they recognize him. When he runs off, everyone else assumes that he is a thief. The act ends with a sadder reprise of "I Could be Happy with You" sung by Polly and the other characters.

=== Act III ===
At the ball, Bobby and the three boys propose to Maisie and the three girls, but the girls reply in unison that "we'll let you know at midnight" and everyone dances to "The Riviera". After everyone has left, Tony and Hortense run into each other. Hortense scolds Tony and tells him to meet Polly at the ball because she loves him as much as he loves her. Tony leaves to prepare for the ball as Lord Brockhurst sings "It's Never Too Late To Fall In Love" with the flirty Dulcie, and is caught by Lady Brockhurst. At the Carnival ball, Polly is sad that Tony is not there and she is thinking about leaving. Hortense tells Mme Dubonnet to persuade Polly to stay, so Polly sings "Poor Little Pierrette" with Mme Dubonnet. Tony later arrives at the ball and takes Polly by surprise. He asks "May I have this dance, Pierrette?" to which Polly replies, "I'm afraid I can't dance with a stranger". He then kisses her to remind her that it is he. When Tony removes his mask, Lord and Lady Brockhurst run to him, exclaiming they found their son at last. Polly and the others discover that Tony is really the son of the rich Lord and Lady Brockhurst, and he had left home to try to make his own way in the world. Polly tells Tony that she is actually rich as well, and Percival and Mme Dubonnet announce that they are getting married. The clock strikes midnight, and the girls unanimously say yes to the boys' proposals. The last scene has everyone dancing as soon as Bobby, with the last spoken line in the play, asks "So how about that dance?" The show ends with a reprise of "The Boy Friend", "I Could Be Happy With You", and "A Room In Bloomsbury".

== Musical numbers ==
Act I

- "Perfect Young Ladies" – Hortense, Maisie, Dulcie, Fay, Nancy, ensemble
- "The Boy Friend" – Polly, Dulcie, Maisie, Fay, Nancy, Marcel, Pierre, Alphonse, ensemble
- "Won't You Charleston With Me?" – Bobby, Maisie
- "Fancy Forgetting" – Mme Dubonnet, Percival
- "I Could Be Happy with You" – Polly, Tony
- Finale Act 1 – Ensemble

Act II

- "Sur La Plage" – Dulcie, Nancy, ensemble
- "A Room in Bloomsbury" – Tony, Polly
- "Nicer in Nice" – Hortense, ensemble
- "The You-Don't-Want-to-Play-with-Me Blues" – Mme Dubonnet, Percival
- "Safety in Numbers" – Maisie, Bobby, Marcel, Alphonse, Pierre
- "I Could Be Happy with You" (reprise) – Polly, Tony
- Finale Act 2 – All

Act III

- "The Riviera" – Bobby, Maisie, Dulcie, Fay, Nancy, Marcel, Alphonse, Pierre, ensemble
- "It's Never Too Late to Fall in Love" – Lord Brockhurst, Dulcie
- "Carnival Tango" – Tango Dancers
- "Poor Little Pierrette" – Mme Dubonnet, Polly
- Finale Act 3 – All

== Film version ==
Ken Russell's 1971 Metro-Goldwyn-Mayer film version of the show, starring Twiggy and Christopher Gable, was an alternative interpretation, weaving the basic plot into a more complicated story in which a seaside dramatic company performing the show is visited by an influential film producer (Vladek Sheybal) on the very night that the leading lady (Glenda Jackson) has to be replaced by the assistant stage manager Polly Browne (Twiggy). The film contains numerous references to the 1930s movie musicals of Busby Berkeley and MGM. It marked one of the final screen appearances of actor/director Max Adrian.

The National Board of Review voted Ken Russell best director, and Twiggy won two Golden Globe awards as best newcomer and best actress (musical/comedy), but the film did not make a significant impact on the American box-office, perhaps because MGM edited it down to 109 minutes. (MGM reissued the full version theatrically in 1987.) It was released to DVD on 12 April 2011, as part of the Warner Archive Collection, a series of made-to-order DVDs. The disc is remastered and is the 136-minute version.

Wilson's original score was freely adapted and augmented by Peter Maxwell Davies for the film. Davies subsequently prepared (and recorded) a concert suite based on the music.

== Sequel ==
A sequel musical titled Divorce Me, Darling! was created by Sandy Wilson in 1964. The musical is set ten years later after The Boy Friend. The original production premiered at The Players' Theatre in London before moving to the West End's Globe Theatre in 1965.
