= Hattie Jacques on stage, radio, screen and record =

Media credits for Hattie Jacques

Hattie Jacques (/dʒeɪks/; born Josephine Edwina Jaques; 1922–1980) was an English actress who appeared in many genres of light entertainment including radio, film, television and stage. Jacques's career spanned from 1939 until her death in 1980. She is best remembered for her appearances in fourteen Carry On films and for her professional partnership with Eric Sykes.

In 1939 Jacques became involved in amateur dramatics, appearing as Doris Gow in Noël Coward's short play Fumed Oak. Five years later, after wartime service as a nurse and a welder, she made her professional theatrical debut at the Players' Theatre in the revue Late Joys, a performance that she repeated on television in 1946. From there she became a regular stage performer, appearing in variety shows and Victorian-style pantomimes.

After her appearances on radio as Sophie Tuckshop alongside Tommy Handley in the final two series of his signature show It's That Man Again, Jacques came to national prominence. She later appeared on Educating Archie as Agatha Dinglebody, where she worked with Tony Hancock; in 1956 she joined Hancock in the cast of the BBC radio show Hancock's Half Hour, playing Griselda Pugh, Hancock's secretary. She made her film debut in an uncredited role in Green for Danger in 1946, before working in a number of minor roles in a series of Dickens adaptations. From 1958 to 1974 she appeared in fourteen Carry On films, where she was "usually cast as formidable hospital matrons (at least four) or man-devouring predators".

Jacques had a long professional partnership with Eric Sykes, with whom she co-starred in two long-running television series, Sykes and a... and Sykes. The couple also produced an album and a single in 1962; a stage show followed between 1976 and 1979, A Hatful of Sykes. Jacques was married to the actor John Le Mesurier in November 1949, but their marriage was dissolved in 1965. Jacques died suddenly in October 1980 from heart failure.

== Stage credits ==
Stage credits of Hattie Jacques
Production	Date	Theatre (London, unless stated)	Role	Notes	Refs.
Fumed Oak	4 May 1939	The Kitson Hall, Barnes	Doris Gow	Amateur production with The Curtain Club	
Borgia	4 May 1939	The Kitson Hall, Barnes	Beatrice of Orsini	Amateur production with The Curtain Club	
Late Joys revue	July 1944	Players' Theatre	–	Professional debut with the Players' Theatre	
The Sleeping Beauty in the Wood	20 December 1944	Players' Theatre	–	Players' Theatre pantomime	
Pantomime	December 1945	Players' Theatre	–		
The Cave and the Garden	24 April 1946	Players' Theatre	–		
The Amiable Mrs Luke	25 September 1946	Players' Theatre	–		
The King Stag	26 December 1946 – January 1947	Lyric Theatre	Smeraldina	With the Young Vic Theatre Company	
The King Stag	January – June 1947	National tour	Smeraldina	Five-month tour with the Young Vic Theatre Company	
Players, Please	9 December 1947	Players' Theatre	–		
Bates Wharf	Spring 1948	Whitehall Theatre	–	With the Under Thirty Theatre Group	
The Sleeping Beauty in the Wood	21 December 1948	Players' Theatre	Fairy Queen	Players' Theatre pantomime	
The Beauty and the Beast	20 December 1949	Players' Theatre	Marygolda	Players' Theatre pantomime	
Please Teacher	April 1950	People's Palace	–	Also on national tour	
Ali Baba and the Thirty-Nine Thieves	19 December 1950	Players' Theatre	Cogia Baba	Adapted by Jacques and Joan Sterndale-Bennett	
Apartments	1 May 1951	Players' Theatre	Mrs Tippity		
The Crystal Palace—1851	3 May 1951	Players' Theatre	–		
Going Up	June 1951	Players' Theatre	Duchess of Kent		
Riquet with the Tuft	18 December 1951	Players' Theatre	Fairy Queen	Adapted by Jacques and Joan Sterndale-Bennett	
The Archie Andrews Christmas Show	December 1951 – January 1952	Prince of Wales Theatre	–		
The Bells of St Martins	29 August – 29 November 1952	St Martin's Theatre	–	Also directed	
Babes in the Wood	December 1952	Players' Theatre	–	Directed	
Cinderella	22 December 1953	Players' Theatre	Fairy Fragrant	Five-week run	
The Players' Theatre Minstrel Show	April 1954	Players' Theatre	–	Also directed	
The Sleeping Beauty in the Wood	December 1954	Players' Theatre	Fairy Antidota		
Twenty Minutes South	May – July 1955	Players' Theatre	–	Produced and directed	
Twenty Minutes South	July – October 1955	St Martin's Theatre	–	Produced and directed; 105 performances	
Chain of Guilt	1956	Players' Theatre	–		
The Two Mrs Carolls	1956	Players' Theatre	–		
Albertine by Moonlight	May 1956	Westminster Theatre	Madame Leonie Urwig		
Ali Baba and the Thirty-Nine Thieves	December 1956	Players' Theatre	Cogia Baba	Adapted by Jacques and Joan Sterndale-Bennett	
Large as Life	23 May – 13 December 1958	London Palladium	–	380 performances	
Royal Variety Performance	3 November 1958	London Coliseum	–		
Royal Variety Performance	May 1960	Victoria Palace Theatre	–		
Riquet with the Tuft	December 1960	Players' Theatre	–	Adapted by Jacques and Joan Sterndale-Bennett	
A Hatful of Sykes	May – September 1976	Pavilion Theatre, Torquay	–		
A Hatful of Sykes	25 February – 5 March 1977	Hong Kong Sheraton	–		
The Royal Silver Jubilee Gala Performance	17 May 1977	King's Theatre, Glasgow	–		
A Hatful of Sykes	29 June 1977	Winter Gardens, Blackpool	–	Summer season	
A Hatful of Sykes	March 1978	Theatre Royal, Lincoln	–		
A Hatful of Sykes	April – 6 May 1978	Seven Arts Theatre, Rhodesia	–	Including a tour of Rhodesia	
A Hatful of Sykes	27 December – 27 January 1979	National Arts Centre, Ottawa and tour of Canada	–		
A Hatful of Sykes	February – March 1979	Tour of South Africa	–		
A Hatful of Sykes	March – July 1979	National tour	–	Consisting Lincoln, Guilford, Cardiff, Wilmslow, Norwich and Brighton	
A Hatful of Sykes	16 July – September 1979	Bournemouth	–		

== Radio broadcasts ==
Radio broadcasts of Hattie Jacques
Broadcast	Date	Role	Notes	Refs.
Variety Bandbox	6 May 1945	–		
It's That Man Again	25 September 1947 – 10 June 1948	Sophie Tuckshop	Series eleven: 38 episodes	
It's That Man Again	23 September 1948 – 6 January 1949	Sophie Tuckshop	Series twelve: 16 episodes	
April Revue	1949	–		
The Bowrey Bar	1949	–		
Heloise	1949	–		
Clay's College	27 June 1949	–		
Educating Archie	6 June – 19 December 1950	Agatha Dinglebody	Series one: 29 episodes	
Further Goings On	1951	–		
Fine Goings On	4 January – 5 July 1951	–	Series one: 14 episodes	
Calling All Forces	28 April 1951	–		
Educating Archie	3 August 1951 – 25 January 1952	Agatha Dinglebody	Series two: 26 episodes	
Arthur's Inn	July 1952	–		
Educating Archie	18 September 1952 – 26 June 1953 (Note: The series was split into two parts: 18 September 1952 – 12 February 1953 and 21 May – 26 June 1953)	Agatha Dinglebody	Series three: 27 episodes	
Educating Archie	15 October 1953 – 1 April 1954	Agatha Dinglebody	Series four: 25 episodes	
"The Santa Claus Show"	25 December 1953	–		
Paradise Street	20 April – 13 July 1954	Agatha Dinglebody	Spin-off series from Educating Archie	
"Archie in Goonland"	11 June 1954	–	The Goon Show and Educating Archie special	
Educating Archie	1955	Agatha Dinglebody	Series five (Note: Full broadcast details are not available.)	
Mrs Dale's Diary	February – April 1955	Mrs Leathers	18 episodes	
These Radio Times	March 1955	–		
You're Only Young Once	April 1955	–		
Hancock's Half Hour	11 November 1956 – 24 February 1957	Griselda Pugh	Series four: 16 episodes (Note: The fourth series was 20 episodes long, with Jacques joining in episode 5.)	
Hancock's Half Hour	21 January – 3 June 1958	Griselda Pugh	Series five: 20 weeks	
Hancock's Half Hour	25 December 1958	Griselda Pugh	Christmas special	
Educating Archie	7 October 1959 – 17 February 1960	Agatha Dinglebody	Series ten: 20 episodes	
It's a Fair Cop	22 May – 10 July 1961	–	8 episodes	
Desert Island Discs	16 October 1961	–	Interviewed by Roy Plomley (Note: Jacques's selection was Beethoven's ninth symphony; Duke Ellington's Hello Little Girl; Handel's "Let the bright Seraphim", from Samson; Bach's "Fugue in A minor"; On the Sunny Side of the Street, by Tommy Dorsey; God Rest Ye Merry, Gentlemen, by the Modern Jazz Quartet; Peter Sellers's recording of "Lord Badminton's Memoirs"; and Judy Garland and the Gordon Jenkins Orchestra with "Red Balloon". Her chosen book was The Oxford Dictionary of Quotations and her luxury item was a photograph and recording of her family.)	
"Hazy Days of Summer"	December 1963	–		
Housewife's Choice	May – August 1964	–	4 episodes	
Souvenir	1965	–	13 episodes	
Twenty Questions	1965	–		
Sounds Familiar	August 1968	–		
Pete's People	October 1969	–	Interviewed by Pete Murray	
My Kind of Music	June 1971	–		
Today Programme	June 1971	–	Live interview on BBC Radio 4	
Morning Story	June 1971	–		

== Television ==
Television appearances of Hattie Jacques
Programme	Date	Channel	Role	Notes	Refs.
Late Joys Revue	11 June 1946	BBC Television	–	Live broadcast from the BBC Alexandra Palace Studios	
No, No, Nanette	1948	BBC Television	–	Live broadcast from the BBC Alexandra Palace Studios	
Out of This World	15 November 1950	BBC Television	–		
Panorama	6 January 1954	BBC Television	–	Featured a film sequence of the pantomime "Cinderella" from the Players' Theatre	
Happy Holidays	10 July – 18 September 1954	BBC Television	Mrs Mulberry	6 episodes	
Plunder	1955	BBC Television	Mrs Howlett		
The Granville Melodramas	10 October – 27 December 1955	ITV	Various	7 episodes	
Tribute to Henry Hall	1956	BBC Television	–		
The Tony Hancock Show	1 June 1956	ITV	–	Series one, episode 6	
The Tony Hancock Show, "Honneur et Fidelite"	30 November 1956	ITV	–	Series two, episode 2	
Pantomania	25 December 1956	BBC Television	Good Fairy		
Hancock's Half Hour	15 April – 10 June 1957	BBC Television	–	Series two: 5 episodes	
A Cup of Kindness	1959	BBC Television	Mrs Tutt		
Gala Opening	7 March 1959	BBC Television	–		
Hancock's Half Hour, "The Cruise"	30 October 1959	BBC Television	Amorous Lady	Series five, episode 6	
Sykes and a...	29 January – 26 February 1960	BBC Television	Hattie Sykes	Series one: 5 episodes	
Royal Variety Performance	22 May 1960	ITV	–	Broadcast from the Victoria Palace Theatre	
Twentieth Century Theatre, "The Insect Play"	19 July 1960	BBC Television	–		
Sykes and a...	11 August – 15 September 1960	BBC Television	Hattie Sykes	Series two: 6 episodes	
Our House	11 September – 4 December 1960	ITV	Georgina Ruddy	Series one: 13 episodes	
Sally Ann Howes Variety Show	1961		–		
Juke Box Jury	1960	BBC Television	–	Jacques made four scheduled appearances on the show on 9 April 1960, 6 October 1962, 30 March 1963 and 13 December 1967 Additionally, Eric Merriman recollected in his biography that she made "several" appearances on other, non scheduled occasions, none of which are verified.	
Sykes and a...	4 January – 8 February 1961	BBC Television	Hattie Sykes	Series three: 6 episodes	
Sykes and a...	14 April – 19 May 1961	BBC Television	Hattie Sykes	Series four: 6 episodes	
Our House	16 September 1961 – 21 April 1962	ITV	Georgina Ruddy	Series two: 26 episodes	
Billy Cotton Band Show	24 December 1961	BBC Television	–		
Sykes and a...	30 January – 20 March 1962	BBC Television	Hattie Sykes	Series five: 8 episodes	
Compact	February 1962	BBC Television	–		
That Was the Week That Was	1 December 1962	BBC Television	–		
Christmas Night with the Stars	25 December 1962	BBC Television	–	Short special from Sykes and a...	
This Is Your Life	12 February 1963	BBC Television	–	Jacques was the show's main guest	
Sykes and a...	21 February – 11 April 1963	BBC Television	Hattie Sykes	Series six: 8 episodes	
Sykes and a...	25 February – 7 April 1964	BBC Television	Hattie Sykes	Series seven: 7 episodes	
Miss Adventure	5 July – 10 October 1964	ITV	Stacey Smith	13 episodes	
A Choice of Coward: Blithe Spirit	17 August 1964	ITV	Madame Arcati		
Sykes and a...	30 October – 4 December 1964	BBC Television	Hattie Sykes	Series eight: 6 episodes	
Cribbins	February 1965	BBC Television	–	Bernard Cribbins's sketch show	
Sykes and a...	5 October – 16 November 1965	BBC Television	Hattie Sykes	Series nine: 7 episodes	
Jackanory	17 January 1966 – 17 February 1967	BBC Television	Narrator	10 episodes – Narrating the stories of Mary Poppins	
Titi-Pu	1967	BBC Television	–	A re-working of The Mikado	
Theatre 625, "The Memorandum"	24 September 1967	BBC Television	Helen		
Sykes Versus ITV	26 November 1967	ITV	–		
Knock Three Times	1968	BBC Television	Miss Popinjay		
Inside George Webley	1968	ITV	–		
The World of Beachcomber	22 January – 22 April 1968	BBC Television	–	Series one: 13 episodes	
Howerd's Hour	12 May 1968	ITV	–	Frankie Howerd's sketch show	
Join Jim Dale	1969		–		
Pickwick	11 June 1969	BBC Television	Mrs Bardell	Based on the musical Pickwick	
Carry On Christmas	24 December 1969	ITV	Elizabeth Barrett / nun / bemused passer-by		
Catweazle	15 March 1970	ITV	–		
Charley's Grants	22 March – 26 April 1970	BBC Television	Mrs Manger		
Dangerpoint	1971		Miss Keen		
Ask Aspel	1971	BBC Television	–		
Sykes and a Big, Big Show	26 February – 2 April 1971	BBC Television	–	6 episodes	
Frankie Howerd: The Laughing Stock of Television	14 April 1971	ITV	–		
Doctor at Large: "Cynthia Darling"	20 June 1971	ITV	Mrs Askey		
Sykes – With the Lid Off	7 July 1971	ITV	–		
Christmas Night with the Stars	25 December 1971	BBC Television	–	Performed short sketch, A Policeman's Lot	
Max Bygraves at the Royalty	3 August 1972	ITV	–		
Max Bygraves at the Royalty	7 September 1972	ITV	–		
Sykes	14 September – 28 December 1972	BBC Television	Hattie Sykes	Series one: 16 episodes	
Carry On Christmas	20 December 1972	ITV	–		
Pebble Mill at One	9 March 1973	BBC Television	–		
Call My Bluff	April 1973	BBC Television	–		
Sykes	10 September – 17 December 1973	BBC Television	Hattie Sykes	Series two: 15 episodes	
Sykes	17 October – 5 December 1974	BBC Television	Hattie Sykes	Series three: 8 episodes	
Celebrity Squares	1975	ITV	–		
Wogan's World	1975	BBC Television	–		
Looks Familiar	14 January 1975	ITV	–		
Carry On Laughing: "Orgy and Bess"	25 January 1975	ITV	Queen Elizabeth		
2nd House: The Sound of Laughter	3 May 1975	BBC Television	–		
Sykes	24 October – 12 December 1975	BBC Television	Hattie Sykes	Series four: 7 episodes	
Sykes: "Christmas Party"	12 December 1975	BBC Television	Hattie Sykes	Christmas special	
Sykes	11 November – 30 December 1976	BBC Television	Hattie Sykes	Series five: 8 episodes	
Eric Sykes: A Few of our Favourite Things	1977	ITV	–		
The Eric Sykes Show	8 June 1977	ITV	–		
Sykes: "Christmas Special"	22 December 1977	BBC Television	Hattie Sykes	Christmas special	
Sykes	4 January – 8 February 1978	BBC Television	Hattie Sykes	Series six: 6 episodes	
Multi-Coloured Swap Shop	21 January 1978	BBC Television	–		
Sykes	5 October – 16 November 1979	BBC Television	Hattie Sykes	Series seven: 7 episodes	
Play It Again, Hattie Jacques	16 June 1980	ITV	–		
Rhubarb Rhubarb	15 December 1980	ITV	Nanny	Shown posthumously (Note: Rhubarb Rhubarb was broadcast on 15 December 1980, two months after Jacques's death from heart failure on 6 October 1980.)	

== Filmography ==
Filmography of Hattie Jacques
Film	Year	Role	Notes
Green for Danger	1946	–	Uncredited
Nicholas Nickleby	1947	Mrs Kenwick	
Oliver Twist	1948	Singer at 'Three Cripples'	
Trottie True	1949	Daisy Delaware	
The Spider and the Fly	1949	Barmaid	Uncredited
Waterfront	1950	Singer	Uncredited
Chance of a Lifetime	1950	Alice	
Scrooge	1951	Mrs Fezziwig	
No Haunt for a Gentleman	1952	Mrs Fitz-Cholmondley	
Mother Riley Meets the Vampire	1952	Mrs Jenks	
The Pickwick Papers	1952	Mrs Nupkins	
All Hallowe'en	1952	Miss Quibble	
The Pleasure Garden	1953	Mrs Albion	
Our Girl Friday	1953	Mrs Patch	
Up to His Neck	1954	Rakiki	
The Love Lottery	1954	Chambermaid	
As Long as They're Happy	1955	Party girl	
Now and Forever	1956	Woman in sportscar with dog	Uncredited
The Square Peg	1958	Gretchen	
Carry On Sergeant	1958	Captain Clark	
Left Right and Centre	1959	Woman in car	
The Night We Dropped a Clanger	1959	Ada	
Follow a Star	1959	Dymphna Dobson	
The Navy Lark	1959	Fortune teller	
Carry On Nurse	1959	Matron	
Carry On Teacher	1959	Grace Short	
Carry On Constable	1960	Sergeant Laura Moon	
Make Mine Mink	1960	Nanette Parry	
School for Scoundrels	1960	First Instructress	
Watch Your Stern	1960	Agatha Potter	
In the Doghouse	1961	Gudgeon	
Carry On Regardless	1961	Sister	
She'll Have to Go	1962	Miss Richards	
The Punch and Judy Man	1963	Dolly Zarathusa	
Carry On Cabby	1963	Peggy Hawkins	
The Plank	1967	Woman with rose in her mouth	
The Bobo	1967	Trinity Martinez	
Carry On Doctor	1967	Matron	
Rhubarb	1969	Nurse Rhubarb	
Monte Carlo or Bust!	1969	Lady journalist	
Carry On Camping	1969	Miss Haggerd	
Carry On Again Doctor	1969	Matron	
Crooks and Coronets	1969	Mabel	
The Magic Christian	1969	Ginger Horton	
Carry On Loving	1970	Sophie Bliss	
Carry On at Your Convenience	1971	Beattie Plummer	
Danger Point	1971	Miss Keen	
Carry On Matron	1972	Matron	
Carry On Abroad	1972	Floella	
You'd Better Go in Disguise	1973	Hattie	
Carry On Dick	1974	Martha Hoggett	
Three for All	1975	Security official	

== Discography ==
Recordings by Hattie Jacques
Title	Year	Format	Label	Notes	Refs.
"Doctor Kildare" / "Bedtime Story"	1962	Single	Decca Records (Y7092)	With Eric Sykes	
Eric and Hattie and Things''!!!	1962	Album	Decca Records (LK 4507)	With Eric Sykes	

== Notes and references ==
Notes

== Bibliography ==
- Debenham, Warren (1988). Laughter on record: a comedy discography. Lanham, MD: Scarecrow Press. ISBN 978-0-8108-2094-4.
- Foster, Andy; Furst, Steve (1999). Radio Comedy, 1938–1968: A Guide to 30 Years of Wonderful Wireless. London: Virgin Books. ISBN 978-0-86369-960-3.
- Gray, Frances (2004). "Jacques, Josephine Edwina (Hattie) (1922–1980)". Oxford Dictionary of National Biography. Oxford University Press. doi:10.1093/ref:odnb/53976. Archived from the original on 24 September 2015. (subscription, Wikipedia Library access or UK public library membership required)
- Herbert, Ian (1978). Who's Who in the Theatre: a Biographical Record of the Contemporary Stage. London: Pitman Publishing. ISBN 978-0-273-01195-8.
- Lewisohn, Mark (1998). Radio Times Guide to TV Comedy. London: BBC Books. ISBN 978-0-563-36977-6.
- McCann, Graham (2009). Bounder! The Biography of Terry-Thomas. London: Aurum Press. ISBN 978-1-84513-441-9.
- Merriman, Andy (2007). Hattie: The Authorised Biography of Hattie Jacques. London: Aurum Press. ISBN 978-1-84513-257-6.
- Rigelsford, Adrian (2004). Peter Sellers: A Life in Character. London: Virgin Books. ISBN 978-0-7535-0270-9.
- Ross, Robert (2001). The Complete Frankie Howerd. London: Reynolds & Hearn. ISBN 978-1-903111-08-6.
- Sheridan, Paul (1952). Late and Early Joys at the Players' Theatre. London: T.V. Boardman. OCLC 504084581.
- Webber, Richard (2004). Fifty Years of Hancock's Half Hour. London: Random House. ISBN 978-1-4464-0998-5.
- Webber, Richard (2008). 50 Years of Carry On. London: Arrow Books. ISBN 978-0-09-949007-4.
