= Ursula Holden =

English novelist (1921–2020)

Ursula R. Holden (8 August 1921 – 2 May 2020) was an English novelist, author of thirteen novels often inspired by her time spent in Ireland. Her first novel, Endless Race, was published when she was 54.

== Early years ==
Ursula Holden was born in August 1921, in Bridport, Dorset, the fourth daughter of five children of Una and Andrew Holden. Her father worked abroad, mostly in Egypt and Holden was educated at home by a governess before going to high school, aged 11, and then to board at St Michael's School, Bognor Regis, at the age of 15.

After World War II, Holden went to Ireland where she became a model in Dublin's Art School. She was married to William Sydney Dixon for twenty three years (divorced 1970) and had 3 daughters. She lived in London all her adult life.

== Writing career ==
It was at a creative writing class at Chiswick Polytechnic in 1968 that she began to realize her talent for writing. After being signed by Andrew Hewson of the John Johnson Literary Agency, her first three novels were published by London Magazine Editions. Admiring her work, the editor of London Magazine, Alan Ross, fostered Holden's career until his death in 2001.

Subsequent novels were published by Methuen. In 2013 Virago reprinted Tin Toys Trilogy: Tin Toys (1986) Unicorn Sisters (1988) A Bubble Garden (1989).

During the 1980s she wrote introductions to several novels by Barbara Comyns published by Virago.

In her early career, Holden's writing room was a booth in the typing room of the British Library. Over the years she benefitted from writers' retreats, and spent some time at the Millay, Yaddo and McDowell Colonies for Artists. The authors who have most influenced her include Jean Rhys, Rosamund Lehmann, Ernest Dowson and Samuel Beckett.

She has never sought fame. 'I couldn't give up the writing time necessary to enter public life. Samuel Beckett stayed in his miserable little flat and hid away, even after he'd been awarded the Nobel prize. I utterly endorse that, but it takes guts.' A photo portrait of her by Fay Godwin is in the National Portrait Gallery, London.

Throughout the 1990s her writing space was her room at a nursing home in London and she wrote daily: 'I write to live and live to write’. Intermittently she wrote for The Oldie magazine.

Throughout her career she was supported by the Royal Literary Fund.

Holden's dedication to writing was recognised by the Royal Society of Literature with the award of a fellowship in 2010.

She died in May 2020 at the age of 98.

== Works ==
- Endless Race, 1975
- Turnstiles, 1977
- String Horses, 1979
- Fallen Angels, 1979
- The Cloud Catchers, 1979
- Penny Links, 1981
- Sing About It, 1982
- Wider Pools, 1983
- Eric's Choice, 1984
- Tin Toys, 1987
- Unicorn Sisters, 1988
- A Bubble Garden, 1989
- Help Me Please, 1991

Holden wrote the introductions to several novels by Barbara Comyns published by Virago Press.
