= Juniper Lake =

Juniper Lake could refer to

- Juniper Lake (Lassen Peak), a lake located in the southeast corner of Lassen Volcanic National Park
- Juniper Lake (Nova Scotia), several lakes with this name in Nova Scotia
