= Goblin mode =

English language neologism

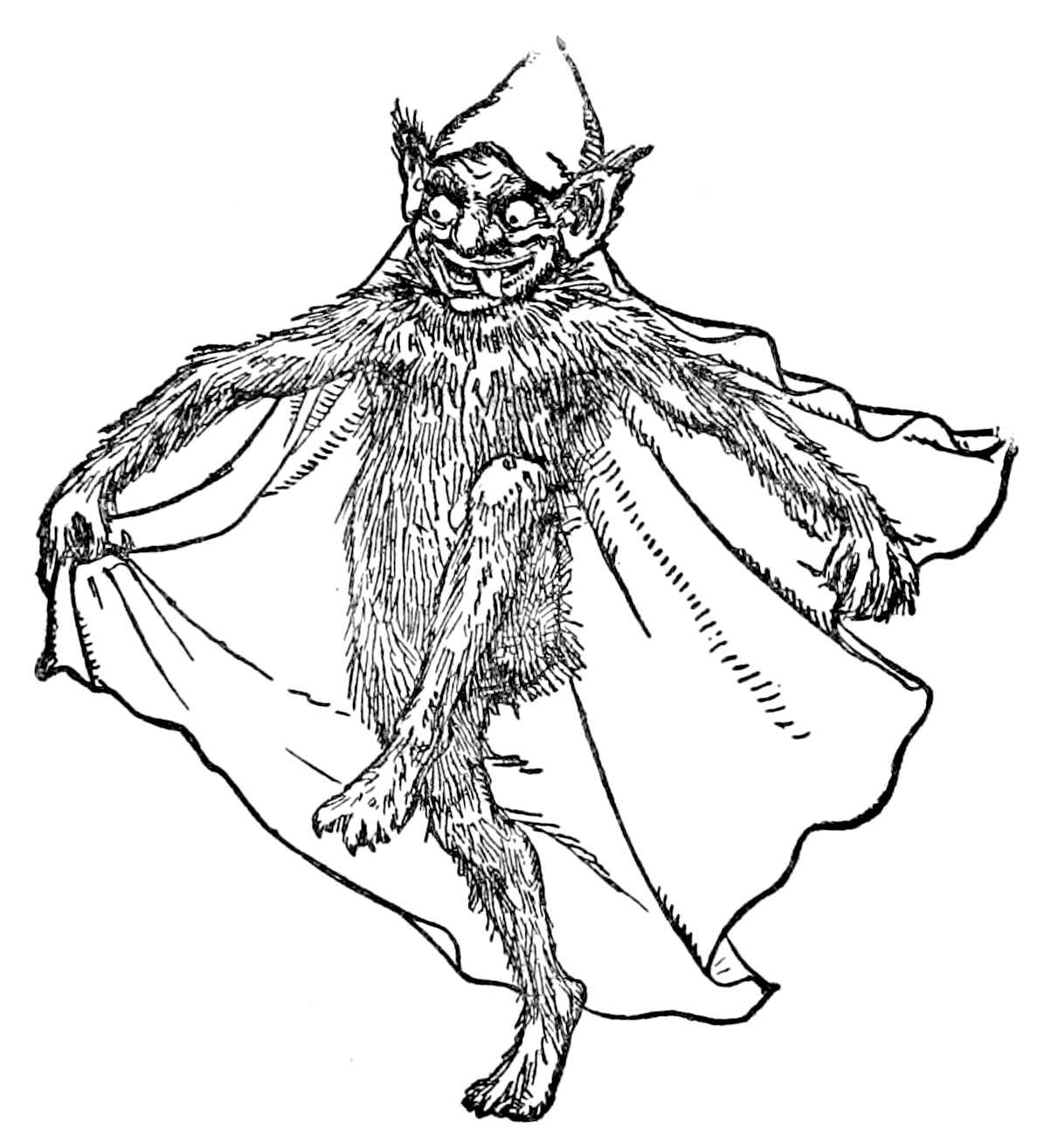
Goblin illustration by John D. Batten from "English Fairy Tales" (19th century)

Goblin mode is a neologism for the rejection of societal expectations in a hedonistic manner without concern for one's self-image. While usage of the term dates back to 2009 with varying definitions, the term went viral in early 2022.

The 2022 popularity derived from a tweet by Twitter shitposter Junlper featuring a doctored Fox News interview headline, purporting that actress Julia Fox used the phrase. The image prompted a large increase in online searches for goblin mode, leading Fox to clarify she did not use the term. Goblin mode has also been linked to a viral Reddit post in which a user admits to acting "like a goblin" when alone at home.

The term went viral on social media platforms such as TikTok, often as a response to other trends such as cottagecore or self-improvement. In April 2022, business magnate Elon Musk posted an image macro implicitly attributing his proposed acquisition of Twitter, Inc. to him being in "goblin mode". In June 2022, the term was defined on Dictionary.com as "a slang term for a way of behaving that intentionally and shamelessly gives in to and indulges in base habits and activities without regard for adhering to social norms or expectations". In December 2022, online respondents selected the term from Oxford Languages' shortlist, which also included metaverse and #IStandWith, as the Word of the Year.

The popularity of goblin mode may be linked to a rejection of the perceived carefully curated lifestyles often presented by social media users. The trend has also been linked to a manner of coping with the effects of the COVID-19 pandemic on society, because it is described as a way of life that gives people permission to reject societal norms and embrace their basic instincts.

== See also ==
- Goblincore, a subculture inspired by the folklore of goblins
- Tang ping – Chinese neologism, "lying flat"
- Deviance (sociology)
- Iliza Shlesinger, who promoted the term "party goblin"
