= Status Update Music =

2026 album by Jane Remover as Leroy

Studio album by Leroy
- Released: May 14, 2026
- Genres: Dariacore; EDM; hyperpop; rave; trap
- Length: 66:38
- Label: Self-released
- Producer: Leroy

Leroy chronology
Grave Robbing (2023)	Status Update Music (2026)

Jane Remover chronology
Heart (2025)	Status Update Music (2026)	Nowhere (2026)

Status Update Music is the fifth studio album by Leroy, a side project of the American musician Jane Remover. The album was self-released on May 14, 2026, exclusively on Bandcamp and SoundCloud. Described by them as documenting "my life as I lived it from May 2025 to May 2026", Status Update Music blends dariacore, EDM, hyperpop, rave, and trap with more than 150 samples from popular music, video games, social media posts, and other Remover songs. In April 2026, a month prior to its release, Remover debuted a remix of "Music Baby" (2025) as Leroy, being one of their first performances to reference the alias.

Previously, Remover debuted under the alias Leroy with Dariacore (2021), later releasing a trilogy of albums that established the sample-based electronic microgenre named after the album. They returned to releasing music under the Leroy name in 2025 by releasing a series of standalone tracks. For the project, Remover utilized a digital audio workstation (DAW) to digitally manipulate multiple samples through pitch shifting, time stretching, filtering, rapid editing, and glitchy distortion.

In promotion of Status Update Music, as well as Revengeseekerz and their EP Heart (both 2025), Remover is embarking on their Live Exhibit tour, which began in June 2026, and is set to conclude in October. Status Update Music received generally positive reviews from music critics. Pitchfork and laut.de praised the album's experimental production and creative use of samples, while The Needle Drop characterized it as initially engaging but overwhelming over time.

== Background ==
In 2021, Jane Remover released the debut album Dariacore under the alias Leroy. It was the first installment in a trilogy of albums that established the sample-based electronic microgenre later known as dariacore; Anthony Fantano retrospectively regarded the album as a defining early release of the genre. The artist initially uploaded untitled tracks to a separate account using screenshots from Daria as cover art. According to Remover, other producers subsequently adopted the style, leading to the widespread use of the term dariacore. The genre emerged from SoundCloud and Discord communities and was largely associated with queer teenage musicians, characterized by high-tempo mashups built from sample-heavy and plunderphonics production. Upon the release of Dariacore 3... At Least I Think That's What It's Called? in 2022, Remover described it as the final project under the Leroy alias, though they later returned to the pseudonym for the 2023 DJ mix project Grave Robbing. In 2025, Remover released three projects: Ghostholding under the Venturing alias in February, Revengeseekerz in April, and the EP Heart in December. Additionally that year, Remover embarked on their headline tour Turn Up or Die Tour from April to May, and was an opening act for Turnstile's Never Enough Tour from September to October.

== Production and composition ==
=== Overview ===
Status Update Music is a dariacore, electronic dance music (EDM), hyperpop, rave, and trap album with elements of rock and hip-hop. Running for more than 66 minutes, the album contains more than 150 samples drawn from popular music, video games, social media audio, and other Remover songs, continuing the sound collage-based approach associated with the Leroy project and the development of dariacore. Multiple references and samples include a hit song from Enrique Iglesias, sound effects from a Pokémon game, a few ad-libs from Danny Brown, a title track by Lil Uzi Vert, a bridge from Aespa's "Supernova", and other music artists such as Janet Jackson, Waka Flocka Flame, Underscores, Tyla and multiple samples from Remover themselves.

For the project, Remover utilized a digital audio workstation (DAW) to digitally manipulate these samples through pitch shifting, time stretching, filtering, rapid editing, and glitchy distortion. As a result, many tracks move through multiple discrete sections, incorporating beat switches and changes in genre within a single composition. Yannik Gölz of laut.de suggested that Remover assembled the album as a collage of the internet culture that had inundated the artist over the previous year. He wrote that it reflects the sensory overload of endless TikTok doomscrolling through rapidly shifting, unexpectedly complex song structures, describing the result as "genuinely progressive".

=== Tracks ===
"If You Think I'm a Bitch, You Should Meet Jane Remover"
Beginning with a Megan Thee Stallion sample, the opening track experiments with multiple genres including rock, jerk, bubblegum bass, and hardstyle under EDM.

Many tracks differ from each other in varying styles and samples. "If You Think I'm a Bitch, You Should Meet Jane Remover" opens with a Megan Thee Stallion sample before transitioning into an EDM-influenced buildup, switching from rock to jerk to bubblegum bass to hardstyle. It also incorporates a pitch-shifted excerpt from Britney Spears's "Toxic" (2004). "XO Tour Llif3", whose title references the song by Lil Uzi Vert, is a digicore mashup with samples from Sleeping With Sirens's "If You Can't Hang" (2011) and Ellie Goulding's "On My Mind" (2015). The Lil Uzi Vert song is not sampled. "...Like Watching a Zombie Turn" begins as an electro track before shifting toward an alternative rock style influenced by emo and nu metal. The fast-paced hardcore techno track "Crowdkilling 101" features metal guitar intervals reminiscent of hardcore punk band Knocked Loose. "Nothing Lasts Forever" combines trap and EDM with several dance music styles, featuring a structural change through a mid-song beat switch. "Chase This Feeling" is built around bright synthesizers and incorporates samples from Remover's earlier recordings. The track concludes with a quieter section centered on piano and acoustic guitar.

"#Boyletmeknow" is described by Fantano as a "psycho glitch reggaeton breakdown". Pitchfork's Kieran Press-Reynolds wrote that the track is built on a sample-collage of various female singles, including Tinashe, Carly Rae Jepsen, Doja Cat, and Kim Petras, whose vocals "team up to call out to a boy who won't text Jane back". "The Summer I Turned Pretty" showcases a remix of Brown's "Lift You Up" (2025) with traces of similarities to English music producer Sophie and the video game Duke Nukem II (1993). "Love.Angel.Music.Baby" opens with audience noise sampled from a Miley Cyrus concert. Its title is derived from Gwen Stefani's debut album (2004), though the album itself is not sampled. "Get Ugly" is an industrial, noise rock remix of Zara Larsson's "Pretty Ugly" (2025) as her voice blends onto metal riffs and "flesh-eating kicks". The final track, "Summer Fling", is Remover's cover of the eponymous track by Melodic Chaotic (Willow Smith).

== Promotion and release ==
Throughout 2025 and 2026, Remover issued material through a series of standalone tracks released online. In April 2026, the artist performed a Leroy remix of "Music Baby" (from their EP Heart) during their set at the Coachella festival, which was one of the first live performances to reference the alias in a Jane Remover set. Later that month, Remover announced the North America leg of their Live Exhibit tour, which began on June 4, in New York and is set to conclude on October 7, in Seattle. The European leg of the tour was later announced in June, which began on August 15, in Gothenburg and concluded on August 29, in Reading.

Status Update Music was released under the pseudonym Leroy on May 14, 2026 as a surprise album. It was released exclusively through the platforms Bandcamp and SoundCloud because its extensive use of uncleared samples prevented distribution through commercial streaming services. The artist captioned the album on Bandcamp as documenting "my life as I lived it from May 2025 to May 2026". The album cover for Status Update Music was photographed in March by Ty of Cloudedfilms.

== Critical reception ==
Professional ratings
Review scores
Source	Rating
laut.de	4/5 stars
The Needle Drop	7/10 (Note: Specifically, Fantano rated the album a "decent to strong 7".)
Pitchfork	7.9/10

Status Update Music received generally positive reviews from music critics. Kieran Press-Reynolds from Pitchfork described the album as Jane Remover's "most unwieldy experiment yet" under the Leroy alias. He wrote that the album expands on the artist's earlier dariacore releases through denser production, longer compositions, and extensive sample manipulation. laut.de's Yannik Gölz stated that the album's "musical DNA" is the "manic, over-the-top and bizarre use of samples" that "throws really everything into the mixer". He also observed that it retains a danceable quality, eventually characterizing the project as "prog-brainrot". Anthony Fantano of The Needle Drop described Status Update Music as initially engaging in the first half, describing the project as increasingly overwhelming over time, comparing its dense, high-intensity production to "the hottest sauna". While not favoring it as much as Remover's other projects, Fantano stated that the album featured several standout tracks he described as "mind-blowing".

== Track listing ==
Status Update Music track listing
No.	Title	Length
1.	"If You Think I'm a Bitch, You Should Meet Jane Remover"	4:13
2.	"XO Tour Llif3"	3:48
3.	"I Did This for Us"	3:37
4.	"...Like Watching a Zombie Turn"	5:04
5.	"Crowdkilling 101"	3:30
6.	"Nothing Lasts Forever (Every Detail U Have Ever Told Me)"	5:07
7.	"Chase This Feeling"	4:53
8.	"#Boyletmeknow"	4:03
9.	"The Summer I Turned Pretty"	3:56
10.	"Right Nowww (Tear Me Apart)"	5:05
11.	"Love.Angel.Music.Baby."	5:03
12.	"I Belong to Nobody (But Tonight I'm Yours)"	4:07
13.	"Get Ugly"	4:15
14.	"In Every Lifetime (Together Like This)"	5:56
15.	"Summer Fling"	4:01
Total length:		66:38

=== Notes ===
- All tracks except "Summer Fling" are stylized in all caps.

== Release history ==
Region	Date	Format(s)	Label
Various	May 14, 2026	Digital download; streaming	Self-released
