= YouTube Poop =

Video parody genre

"Meamboat Billie's Steamed Willie", a YouTube Poop of the animated short film, Steamboat Willie

A YouTube Poop (shortened as YTP) is a type of video mashup or collage film, created by remixing or editing pre-existing media sources. YouTube Poops originated around 2004, quickly becoming popular online.

YouTube Poops often incorporate internet memes, slang, and popular music, carrying subcultural significance into a new video for humorous, nonsensical, random, vulgar, satirical, obscene, absurd, profane, annoying, confusing, or dramatic purposes.

== History ==
=== Precursors and influences ===
YouTube Poop is a subset of remix culture, in which existing ideas and media are modified and reinterpreted to create new art and media in various contexts. Forms of remix culture have existed long before the internet, with DigitalTrends' Luke Dormehl listing the cut-up technique of William Burroughs and sampling in hip-hop as examples. Dormehl also says that "aesthetically", YouTube Poop is similar to the "frenetic editing style" of MTV in the 1980s, which featured "fast, non-linear cuts" that focused less on character or plot than on evoking a feeling.

YouTube Poop also draws on elements from the vidding scene, in which fans of a piece of media would create music videos using footage from the work. Observers have also proposed influences from a more modern, internet-based practice similar to vidding, the anime music video (AMV) – particularly from more comedic variations of the AMV.

=== Early history and "Golden Age" ===
The genre began in the early 2000s. The first video to be regarded as a YouTube Poop is named "The Adventures of Super Mario Bros. 3 REMIXED!!!" (which has been renamed to "I'D SAY HE'S HOT ON OUR TAIL") by the creator SuperYoshi, uploaded onto SheezyArt on December 22, 2004, preceding the creation of YouTube by a few months. It remixes clips from the 1990 animated television series The Adventures of Super Mario Bros. 3 as a primary source, using the video editing software Windows Movie Maker. Media scholar Randall Halle suggests that the name "poop" as used to refer to videos like SuperYoshi's referred to the purported low quality of these early works.

Throughout the mid-to-late 2000s, YouTube Poop (YTP) emerged as a dominant and highly influential genre of absurdist remix culture on YouTube, characterized by the frenetic editing of found footage to produce nonsensical or transgressive audiovisual collages. YouTuber EmpLemon describes this era as being characterized by popular recurring memes and in-jokes in the community. According to Halle, the 2010 video "jonathan swift returns from the dead to eat a cheese sandwich" has been cited as "a work that moved YTP towards artistry", with heavy use of video in video editing and other methods of distortion.

=== Decline in popularity ===
The YouTube Poop genre declined in popularity during the late 2010s. Popular creators such as Schaffrillas Productions and EmpLemon switched their focus to other topics; in Schaffrillas' case, film analysis. eMarketer principal analyst Nicole Perrin speculated that the reason why the genre had "fallen to the wayside" was as part of a larger YouTube "shift to glossier, more corporate-friendly content."

Luke Dormehl wrote in 2019 in relation to this loss of mainstream popularity that "as with every other corner of the internet", YTP had undergone fragmentization from a large single community with a shared set of sources into a series of sub-communities, each with their own preferred source material. However, this has also allowed each individual sub-community to develop its own set of convoluted "references-within-references" even further. Additionally, YTP has followed the general YouTube trend of increasing professionalization and editing, with more sophisticated and larger amounts of special effects and elaborate writing.

=== Legacy ===
YTP has had a significant influence on memes and Internet culture. Many stylistic traits of YTP have entered the editing vocabulary of mainstream YouTubers, such as rapid editing, sound effects, and sudden drastic changes in volume for comedic effect. Many mainstream YouTubers even hire YTP editors to edit their normal videos.

== Style and techniques ==
=== Structure, culture and subgenres ===
Some videos may involve completely or partially repurposing sources to create or convey an often self-aware story, while others follow a non-linear narrative, and some may contain no storyline at all, instead regarded among the lines of surreal humor and artistic experimentation. To this degree, a YouTube Poop may even consist solely of an existing video, sometimes modified, repeated in a slowed or remixed loop. Associate professor of cultural anthropology at Kansas State University Michael Wesch has defined YouTube Poops as "absurdist remixes that ape and mock the lowest technical and aesthetic standards of remix culture to comment on remix culture itself".

YTP can often be derivative in the sense that the work of one creator (or, within the community, pooper) is sometimes used as the underlying work for another video; this can be recirculated and lead to the creation of "YTP tennis" videos, named for how they exist in rounds where the original video accumulates edits and alterations. Lawrence Lessig, Professor of Law at Harvard Law School, compared this aspect to a form of call and response, here seen as being prominent within remix culture.

"3000 Subbies", an example of a YTPMV with an original song that uses clips from Battle for Dream Island

A YTP "collab", or collaboration, is a common practice, and involves various creators joining to produce a single, sometimes very long, video.

A subgenre of YouTube Poops is YouTube Poop music video (YTPMV), which involves clips from different forms of media remixed in a musical form, often in a fast-paced and editing-intensive manner. Japanese online communities formed a type of YTPMV popular on Niconico called otoMADs (音MAD); these videos often use Niconico or Japanese pop culture references.

=== Source material ===
While essentially any audiovisual media is "fair game" for source material, some of the most common sources of YouTube Poops include movies, television shows, anime, cartoons, commercials, or other YouTube videos.

Among the most popular sources are 1990s cartoons, particularly critically disregarded ones such as Super Mario World and Adventures of Sonic the Hedgehog. The work of children's poet Michael Rosen has also been used. These diverse media sources, from different time periods and styles, are often combined in YTPs.

The cutscenes from Nintendo games released on the Philips CD-i—most notably Hotel Mario, Link: The Faces of Evil and Zelda: The Wand of Gamelon, which received mixed reception at the time of their release but have been retrospectively criticized for low-quality animation, voice acting, and scripts—are also frequently used, and have achieved more widespread notoriety as a result.

=== Editing techniques ===
A typical YouTube Poop uses visual and auditory effects to alter the underlying work, as well as rearrangement of individual clips. The edits are often "abrupt and jarring", with lots of quick cuts and time stretching leading to an "often-frenetic" pace. Ruth Alexandra Moran interprets the style as producing "aesthetics of malfunction".

An example of a YouTube Poop of an episode of About Safety, which uses sentence mixing

The most common type of rearrangement is "sentence-mixing", a form of editing in which dialogue is rearranged or chopped up to form new, often humorous or vulgar dialogue. One famous sentence-mix from the YouTube Poop "Robotnik Has a Viagra Overdose" by creator Stegblob takes a scene from an episode of Adventures of Sonic the Hedgehog titled "Boogey-Mania" in which Doctor Robotnik accuses his henchmen of "snooping as usual" and cuts out everything but the second and third syllable to leave only the nonsensical word "pingas", which was construed to resemble the word "penis". Over the years, "Pingas" has since become one of the biggest memes related to the Sonic the Hedgehog franchise in general and has been referenced in both the Archie comic and the Sonic Boom television series. In an interview, Sonic the Hedgehog co-star James Marsden was asked a question about the word, in which he erroneously guessed that it was Doctor Robotnik's original catchphrase.

Another more recent example of sentence mixing's cultural relevance is the BEATULS series by YouTuber RednasVGM, a musical project combining original instrumental covers of various video game, anime and pop cultural references with sentenced mixed vocals lifted from various songs and performances by The Beatles. One of the more popular Beatuls projects is a full album of covers based on video game The Legend Of Zelda: Ocarina Of Time.

Some techniques are more abrasive, like the "stutter loop", in which a short clip of video is repeated over and over. An abrasive auditory trope is the sudden extreme increase in volume to shock the viewer, known as "ear-rape" or "earrape".

== Copyright and fair use ==
As YouTube Poop is a medium built on repurposing copyrighted media, it has been particularly vulnerable to copyright law. YouTube Poops have often been subject to copyright claims on YouTube. Political scientist and author Trajce Cvetkovski noted in 2013 that, despite Viacom filing a copyright infringement lawsuit against YouTube in 2007 explicitly concerning YouTube Poops, in particular "The Sky Had a Weegee" by Hurricoaster, which features scenes from the animated series SpongeBob SquarePants episode "Shanghaied", it and many others have remained on YouTube.

Copyright law in the United Kingdom allows people to use copyrighted material for the purposes of parody, pastiche, and caricature without being seen as infringing on the copyright of the material. Copyright owners are only able to sue the parodist if the work is perceived as communicating hateful or discriminative messages, and modifying the intended purpose of the copyright owner's material. If the case is then taken to court, judges are advised in jurisdictional terms to decide whether the video meets these criteria.

== See also ==
- Animutation
- Brainrot
- Cult Toons
- Daffy Duck in Hollywood – a 1938 Merrie Melodies short with similarities to YouTube Poop
- Détournement
- Downfall parodies
- Netdisaster
- Remix album, an album with remixes, first used in Harry Nilsson's album Aerial Pandemonium Ballet
- Reanimated collaboration
- Schichlegruber Doing the Lambeth Walk, a 1942 British propaganda short with similarities to YouTube Poop
- Break-in records, comedic records by DJs that often sentence-spliced celebrities and politicians with clips from popular music
- Shitposting
- They're Taking the Hobbits to Isengard, a 2005 video remixing clips from the Lord of the Rings trilogy
- Weird SoundCloud
- YTMND
- Supercut
- Plunderphonics, a music genre

== Bibliography ==
- Burgess, Jean; Green, Joshua; Jenkins, Henry; Hartley, John (2013). YouTube: Online Video and Participatory Culture. John Wiley & Sons. ISBN 9780745675350. Archived from the original on March 3, 2017.
- Coppa, Francesca (2022). "Introduction: Vidding and the Rise of Remix Culture". Vidding: A History. University of Michigan Press. pp. 1–22. doi:10.3998/mpub.10069132.6. ISBN 978-0-472-03852-7. JSTOR 10.3998/mpub.10069132.6.
- Moran, Ruth Alexandra (April 1, 2017). "Concepts of the database in contemporary media practice". Interactions: Studies in Communication & Culture. 8 (1): 21–34. doi:10.1386/iscc.8.1.21_1.
