= Sandy Wilson =

English composer (1924–2014)

- Born: Alexander Galbraith Wilson; 19 May 1924
- Died: 27 August 2014 (aged 90)
- Known for: The Boy Friend (1953)

Alexander Galbraith "Sandy" Wilson (19 May 1924 – 27 August 2014) was an English composer and lyricist, best known for his musical The Boy Friend (1953).

== Biography ==
Wilson was born in Sale, Cheshire, England, and was educated at Harrow School. In 1942 he won a State Scholarship for a wartime course at SOAS and was assigned to study Japanese. He was thus one of the so-called 'Dulwich Boys' who studied at SOAS and boarded at Dulwich College. While there he put together a satirical review titled 'A Matter of Course' based on his experiences on the Japanese course. He was one of the few not to complete the course and he subsequently served in the Royal Army Ordnance Corps in Great Britain, Egypt and Iraq. After the war he went to Oriel College, Oxford and while a student wrote revues for the Oxford University Experimental Theatre Club and then attended the Old Vic Theatre School on a production course.

Most of his work for the stage was material for revues, such as Hermione Gingold's Slings and Arrows, Laurier Lister's Oranges and Lemons, and See You Later, starring such performers as Peter Cook. He wrote the book, music and lyrics for The Boy Friend for the Players' Theatre in 1953. Its success resulted in a longer version being produced in the West End at Wyndham's Theatre. After its opening in January 1954, over 2,000 performances were put on there. It opened on Broadway in 1954, at the Royale Theater, and introduced Julie Andrews in her Broadway debut. The show ran on Broadway for over 480 performances.

Wilson wrote the musical Valmouth in 1958, based on a Ronald Firbank novel set in a seaside resort. In 1964 he wrote Divorce Me, Darling!, a sequel to The Boy Friend. His last work was a version of Aladdin (1979) for the Lyric Theatre, Hammersmith.

His autobiography, published in 1975, is titled I Could Be Happy.

Sandy Wilson died in Taunton, England in 2014, aged 90. His longtime partner was Chak Yui. Wilson was a member of the Labour Party and contributed to the Elizabethan magazine during his years of greatest fame.

In 1999, Wilson donated his papers to the Harry Ransom Center. The papers include produced and unproduced plays, mostly musicals but also plays for stage and TV, as well as drafts of Wilson's published and unpublished works including an autobiography, illustrated book, novels, articles, and short stories, along with correspondence.

== Musicals ==
- Caprice (1950)
- The Boy Friend (1953)
- The Buccaneer (1955)
- Valmouth (1958)
- Pieces of Eight (1959)
- Divorce Me, Darling! (1964)
- As Dorothy Parker Once Said (1969)
- His Monkey Wife (1971)
- The Clapham Wonder (1978, based on the novel The Vet's Daughter by Barbara Comyns)
- Aladdin (1979)
