= New Urbanist Memes for Transit-Oriented Teens =

Facebook group concerning New Urbanism

- Cover photo, January 2018
- Website type: Facebook group
- Available in: English
- Owners: Juliet Eldred; Emily Orenstein; Jonathan Marty
- Creator: Juliet Eldred
- Website: www.facebook.com/groups/whatwouldjanejacobsdo
- Commercial: No
- Users: ~226,000
- Launched: March 14, 2017
- Current status: Online

New Urbanist Memes for Transit-Oriented Teens, also known as NUMTOT or Numtots among other variations, is a Facebook group dedicated to discussion, Internet memes, and general discourse surrounding New Urbanism and public transport. As of July 2026, the group has more than 224,000 members.

The group was created in March 2017 as "New Urbanist Shitposting" and was intended as a spin-off to another Facebook group dedicated to maps and cartographic jokes. Reception of New Urbanist Memes for Transit-Oriented Teens is generally positive, with mentions that the group has inspired its members to take urban planning courses and apply for internships and jobs. The group's members have created about 20 to 50 spin-off groups related to the original.

== History ==
Originally titled "New Urbanist Shitposting", the group was co-founded by Juliet Eldred, then a college senior at the University of Chicago; Emily Orenstein, a junior classmate; and Jonathan Marty of New York University; on March 14, 2017, during their Winter Quarter final exams. It was a spin-off of another Facebook group, "I Feel Personally Attacked by this Relatable Map," run by Eldred and Orenstein, which concerns GIS and mapping humor. Its formation was spurred by a discussion of the National Interstate and Defense Highways Act of 1956.

On January 15, 2020, the NUMTOT "administrative board" (group administrators Juliet Eldred, Jonathan Marty, and Emily Orenstein, and group moderators William Clark and Sebastian Beaghen) announced their endorsement of Bernie Sanders for President of the United States.

== Content ==
The group's content is user-submitted. As of March 2018, each post requires moderator approval. Posts include either Internet memes, links, news articles, and popular culture references. Internet memes have been related to Amtrak, Dungeons & Dragons, Cities: Skylines, bollards, urbanist Jane Jacobs, New York City planner Robert Moses, and Thomas the Tank Engine, among other related topics. The group's custom URL on Facebook is "whatwouldjanejacobsdo", a play on the phrase "What would Jesus do?".

Forum administrators and moderators include co-founders Orenstein, Marty, and Eldred. Chicago magazine noted that the group has a strong left-wing political orientation, "imploring for public funds dedicated to transit, at a high cost to the rich."

As of 5 July 2018, Eldred estimates there are 300 posts per day. Orenstein notes 40% of the membership is 18–25 years old, while 25% work in transit-related fields. The Guardian stated it was "predominantly millennials". Since coverage in CityLab, Orenstein reported there was an "uptick in 'market urbanist types'." As of March 2018, its cover photo is a member-designed satirical map wherein each station is labelled with a reference to the group's myriad in-jokes.

== Reactions ==
=== Reception ===
Reception for the group has been generally positive. Angles from the CPJ described New Urbanist Memes for Transit-Oriented Teens as "a Facebook group to provide for the dearth of urbanist memes of the internet." Chicago said its "most hilarious moments happen when these streams converge, applying elbow-patched academic remove to nonexistent objects of pop-culture speculation." CityLab called the group "a place to get engaged with matters of profound importance to local communities."

Boston College student newspaper The Heights remarked that the co-founder of spin-off group Boston College Memes for Jesuit Tweens "enjoys the content posted in [the group]." The Montana Kaimin of the University of Montana mentioned the group in an opinion piece for Neo-Luddism. University at Buffalo's The Spectrum included NUMTOT among "part of a rise in niche Facebook groups that are often light-hearted" with others titled Cone Spotting and Dogspotting. Chicago StreetsBlog noted that "[the group] has U. of C. (University of Chicago) roots."

=== Internal dissent ===
In Autumn 2017, Eldred requested that group members compensate the moderators for emotional labor via Venmo, a request that was met with a critical reception. Eldred said, "There have been times where it's like we're being asked to moderate the Israeli–Palestinian conflict in a group about, you know, trains."

There has also been criticism of the group's political orientation. Eldred said, "the communists complain that the group is too neoliberal, and the market urbanists complain that the group is too communist. A lot of people will rag on the mods for being centrists. And most of us are socialists."

=== Impact ===
The group has inspired a number of actions. Members have been inspired to take urban planning courses, apply for internships and jobs for city halls and United States Department of Transportation, and organize local meetups to discuss discourse. Eldred recruited members to her Democratic Socialists of America local chapter.

On January 15, 2020, NUMTOT administrators endorsed Bernie Sanders in the 2020 Democratic presidential primaries, praising his “message of peace, equity, and justice.” The reasons cited include Sanders’ support for building 10 million affordable housing units, making Section 8 housing assistance for low-income families an entitlement, national rent control, creating a National Housing Agency to combat housing discrimination, the Green New Deal, and investing $300 billion in public transport. In response, Sanders himself joined the group and thanked the group in a post, saying, “thank you NUMTOT for your support of our campaign, and for all you are doing to create the lasting and fundamental change our country needs”.

=== Spin-offs ===
Eldred says there are between 20 and 50 spin-offs, such as "7000-Series Memes for Congressionally Disenfranchised Teens" (for Washington, D.C.), "Form and Function Memes for Architectural Teens," "Old Urbanist Memes for Chariot Riding Teens", "Pre-Columbian Memes for Maize-Cultivating Teens," “Dank Neotraditional Architecture Memes for Premodern Teens”, "Two-Wheeled Memes for Bicycled-Oriented Teens", "Southwest Transit Memes for Desert-Oriented Teens", and "Amchad Memes for American Rail Apologist Teens".

A subreddit on Reddit where the participants create rapid transit systems based on the location of Subway restaurant franchises, called "subwaysubway", was inspired by a NUMTOT group discussion.

An Instagram account using the NUMTOTs handle was created to share popular memes in the group on the platform. The group is unaffiliated with the original NUMTOTs group.

== See also ==
- Internet activism
- List of University of Chicago alumni
- Shitposting
