= The Vet's Daughter =

1959 novel by Barbara Comyns

- First edition
- Author: Barbara Comyns
- Publisher: Heinemann
- Publication date: 1959
- Publication place: United Kingdom
- Media type: Print ( Paperback)
- Pages: 133 pp
- ISBN: 0-86068-163-7

The Vet's Daughter (ISBN 0-86068-163-7) is a 1959 novel by English author Barbara Comyns.

== Premise ==
Alice Rowlands is the daughter of a South London veterinarian in the Edwardian era. Alice's father is a bully who rules their repressed house through terror. Alice's frail mother dies and is swiftly replaced in the family home by her father's brash and sexually savvy new girlfriend. The confusion and abuse heaped on Alice combined with her ultimate optimism lead to her discovering her own occult powers, with disastrous results. The quality of the writing and of that "innocent eye which observes with childlike simplicity the most fantastic or the most ominous occurrence" was praised by Graham Greene.

== History ==
Barbara Comyns dreamt the idea for The Vet's Daughter whilst on honeymoon in a Welsh cottage lent to her and her new husband by the Soviet agent Kim Philby in 1945. The novel was not to be completed for some years and was first published by Heinemann in 1959. In 1978 the novel was used as the basis for the musical The Clapham Wonder, directed by Sandy Wilson. It was republished by Virago in 1981 and has been reprinted several times since then. The story was read by Susannah Harker for BBC Radio.

== Reception ==
In 2019, the book was featured on the BBC Radio 4 programme A Good Read, where it was described as "suburban gothic meets magical realism".

Avril Horner writing in 2021 for TLS. Times Literary Supplement noted that the book is "now considered by many to be her finest novel" and received "many enthusiastic reviews".
