= Shitposting =

Intentionally posting poor-quality social media posts

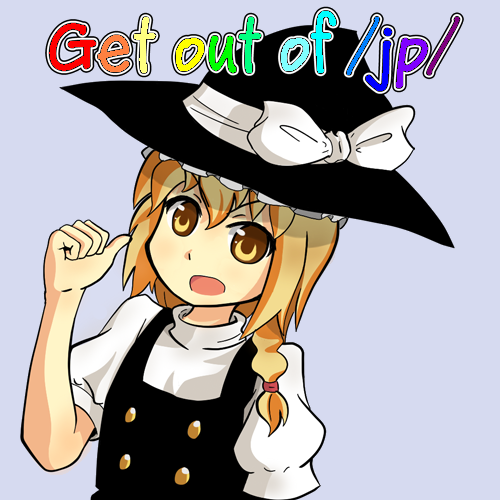
An example of a frequently-reposted shitpost meme ("reaction image") originating from the /jp/ (Otaku culture) board of 4chan, featuring the Touhou Project character Marisa Kirisame

In Internet culture, shitposting is the act of using an online forum or social media page to post content that is of "aggressively, ironically, and trollishly poor quality". Shitposts are generally intentionally designed to derail discussions or cause the biggest reaction with the least effort. It may even sometimes be orchestrated as part of a co-ordinated flame war to render a website unusable by its regular visitors.

== Etymology ==
Shitposting is a contemporary form of online provocation. The term itself appeared around the mid-2000s on image boards such as 4chan. Writing for Polygon, Sam Greszes compared shitposting to Dadaism's "confusing, context-free pieces that, specifically because they were so absurd, were seen as revolutionary works both artistically and politically". Greszes writes that the goal of shitposting is "to make an audience so confused at the lack of content that they laugh or smile".

Professor Greg Barton, an expert on terrorism at Deakin University, said that racist shitposting is common across the internet and is a way for people to connect and gain attention. He said, "The thing about social media is that it's social. You want some feedback, you want people to like your stuff whether it's Instagram or Facebook. Shitposting is all about getting your profile up, getting a response and the more ironic and funny you can be the more you get."

== In modern politics ==
The political uses of shitposting came to prominence during the 2016 United States presidential election. In May of that year, The Daily Dot wrote that a shitpost is "a deliberate provocation designed for maximum impact with minimum effort".

In September 2016 the pro-Trump group Nimble America received widespread media attention. The Daily Beast described the group as "dedicated to 'shitposting' and circulating internet memes maligning Hillary Clinton".

In September 2016, The Independent wrote that shitposting is an apolitical "tool that can be put to a variety of effects", but posts such as these appeared long before the 2016 US presidential election. Engineering & Technology magazine wrote that "shitposting, whether from the left or right, is perilously close to delivering an online metastasis of Orwell's Two-minute Hate [sic]".

In November 2016, Esquire magazine wrote, "internet mockery is emerging as a legitimate political technique: shitposting. Maybe the 2020 election will be all shitposting."

In March 2018, talking about the Facebook group New Urbanist Memes for Transit-Oriented Teens (NUMTOT), Chicago magazine described it as "posts that are meant to be awkward and irrelevant, aggravating and distracting social media communities from discussing their topic at hand".

The Financial Times defined shitposting as "posting ostentatiously inane and contextless content to an online forum or social network with the effect of derailing discussion". It gave the example of the British former Liberal Democrat leader Jo Swinson being forced to deny she had killed squirrels for fun after online trolls made up a story about her having done so.

== In music ==
In 2024, writing for Pitchfork, music journalist Kieran Press-Reynolds coined the term "shitpost modernism" to describe a wave of artists influenced directly or indirectly by shitpost culture, stating "Imagine if 'shitpost' didn't mean far-right 4channers spamming Dark Brandon GIFs but instead became a zeitgeist-defining aesthetic for music". They cited American rapper Lil Yachty's "Poland", Saint Mercator's "Da Biggest Bird", Audwin Gray's "KRUSTY KREW ANTHEM" alongside the vocal style of Yeat, Yuno Miles and 645AR. Argentine rapper AgusFortnite2008 cited internet shitpost culture as an influence. Additionally, Press-Reynolds cited several precursors to the style such as "Pisscore" and artists Lil B, IceJJFish, and James Ferraro.

== See also ==
- AI slop – Low-quality AI-generated digital content
- Algospeak – Obfuscated speech on social media
- Brain rot – Slang for poor-quality digital content
- Copypasta – Block of text copied and pasted across the Internet
- Cringe comedy – Subgenre of comedy
- Dril – Pseudonymous Twitter and Bluesky user
- Hot take – Immediate opinionated/controversial statement on news events
- Imageboard – Type of Internet forum
- Internet forum – Website for online discussions
- Italian brainrot – 2025 AI-generated Internet memes
- Junlper – American Twitter user (born 1995)
- Low culture – Forms of popular culture with mass appeal
- Meme – Cultural idea that spreads through imitation
- North Atlantic Fella Organisation – Pro-Ukraine social media movement
- Ragebait – Internet rage incitement
- Remix culture – Culture encouraging the creation of derivative works
- Weird SoundCloud – Genre of parody music, usually associated with SoundCloud
- Weird Twitter – Genre of internet humor
- YouTube Poop – Video parody genre
- Schizoposting – Posting seemingly disjointed and conspiratorial content
