= Our Spoons Came from Woolworths =

Book by Barbara Comyns

- First edition
- Author: Barbara Comyns
- Genre: Fiction
- Publisher: Eyre & Spottiswoode
- Publication date: 1950
- Publication place: United Kingdom
- Media type: Print (Hardcover & Paperback)

Our Spoons Came from Woolworths is a novel by the English writer Barbara Comyns, first published in 1950.

== The story ==
The book is based on Comyns's marriage to John Pemberton, which ended in 1935. In the bohemian London of the 1930s, Sophia Fairclough and her husband Charles are painters, twenty-one and newly married, and poor. Sophia has two babies and a pet newt, becomes a life model to support her family and starts an affair with an ageing art critic called Peregrine. The book is substantially autobiographical, with only a small number of purely imaginary scenes.

== Publication ==
Our Spoons Came from Woolworths was published by Eyre & Spottiswoode in 1950. It was reissued by Virago in 1983, and has been reprinted several times since then.
