= The Juniper Tree (novel) =

1985 novel by Barbara Comyns

- Author: Barbara Comyns
- Language: English
- Publisher: Methuen (UK); St. Martin's Press (US)
- Publication date: 1985
- Publication place: United Kingdom
- Media type: Print (Hardcover & Paperback)
- Pages: 187 pp (first edition, hardcover)
- ISBN: 0-31-244858-9 (first edition, hardcover)

The Juniper Tree is a 1985 novel by British writer Barbara Comyns. The penultimate novel of the author, it combines gothic literature, family drama, magical realism, and fairy tale. The book contains allusions to the 1812 fairy tale "The Juniper Tree" by the Brothers Grimm, which is where the title of the novel comes from. The story features Bella Winter, a homeless, jobless mother of a toddler, who is disfigured from a car accident and distancing herself from her abusive mother.

== Reception ==
The Juniper Tree met mixed reviews upon its initial 1985 release. The Financial Times praised it as “delicate, tough, quick-moving . . . haunting,” while Kirkus criticized it as “a gruesome and emotionally erratic story . . . with a narrative that’s languid yet jarring, ranging from fecund, pastoral scenes to defacements, sudden deaths, and madness.”

The Juniper Tree was republished in 2018 by New York Review Books Classics, renewing interest in the novel.
