= Joan Sterndale-Bennett =

British actress (1914–1996)

Joan Sterndale-Bennett in Brighton Rock (1948)

Joan Sterndale-Bennett (5 March 1914 – 27 April 1996) was a British stage and film actress, best known as a character comedian for her work at the Players' Theatre in London.

== Career ==
Born into a musical family, her father, Thomas Case Sterndale Bennett, was a songwriter, entertainer and a grandson of the composer William Sterndale Bennett. Her mother, Christine Bywater, was a professional oratorio singer.

After studying at the Royal Academy of Dramatic Art and later with the American choreographer Buddy Bradley, she started with repertory in 1933 in Strange Orchestra at Worthing before moving to London's West End.

From 1938 she appeared in the Herbert Farjeon reviews Nine Sharp, Diversion, Light and Shade, In Town Again and the pantomime The Glass Slipper. In that same year at the invitation of Leonard Sachs she joined the Players' Theatre which was to be the start of a forty-year association at the home of traditional music hall in London and which provided her with a platform to excel in that special direct relationship between the performer and audiences.

In 1943, she made her film debut taking small parts in Anthony Asquith's We Dive at Dawn and as Rose in Bernard Miles's Tawny Pipit.

In 1951, in collaboration with Hattie Jacques, she adapted Ali Baba, or, the Thirty-Nine Thieves which they had copied out long-hand from the British Museum, and later wrote a Victorian pantomime based on Riquet with a Tuft as a special show for the Festival of Britain.

After four years starring as the French schoolmistress in the musical The Boy Friend she made her Broadway debut at the Strollers Theatre Club in 1961 in Time, Gentlemen Please in which she was hailed as Britain's answer to Ethel Merman.

In 1966, she gave a critically acclaimed performance as Mrs Banks in Barefoot in the Park, to be followed by the long running comedy No Sex Please, We're British in London and South Africa. The BBC TV production in 1958 of The Noble Spaniard by Somerset Maugham saw her starring alongside Dame Margaret Rutherford and Kenneth Williams.

Returning to her roots she regularly appeared in the BBC TV series The Good Old Days based on the formula used at the Players' Theatre compered by Leonard Sachs.

Prone to stage fright which was never apparent to her audiences, she declined several professional opportunities which might well have secured her greater recognition, as her abilities deserved. One critic remarked that, like so many actors, she suffered anguish behind the clown's mask.

She was briefly married to the actor John Barron during the Second World War. She had no children. She retired early to become something of a recluse living with her stepmother Mary Maskelyne, a member of the famous illusionist family and later wardrobe mistress at the Players' Theatre.

== Selected plays and musicals ==
- Strange Orchestra (1933)
- The Glass Slipper (1945)
- See You Again (1952)
- The Boy Friend (musical) (1954)
- Time Gentlemen Please! (1961)
- Barefoot in the Park (1966)
- No Sex Please, We're British (1970)

== Selected filmography ==
- We Dive at Dawn (1943) - (uncredited)
- Tawny Pipit (1944) - Rose
- The Woman in the Hall (1947) - Shop assistant
- Brighton Rock (1948) - Delia
- Poet's Pub (1949) - (uncredited)
- Angels One Five (1952) - W.A.A.F.
- The Spider's Web (1960) - Mrs. Elgin
- Don't Bother to Knock (1961) - Spinster
- Dangerous Corner (ITV adaptation 1963) - Miss Mockeridge
- San Ferry Ann (1965) - Madame of Hotel
- Jules Verne's Rocket to the Moon (1967) - Queen Victoria
- Decline and Fall... of a Birdwatcher (1968) - Lady Circumference
- All at Sea (1969) - Miss Fisby
