= Netdisaster =

Prank website

- Desktop application icon

- Screenshot (after shutdown) Screenshot of Netdisaster as of August 1, 2010
- Website type: Prank site
- Available in: English
- Creator: Denis Rionnet
- Website: netdisaster.com
- Commercial: No
- Registration: none
- Launched: February 8, 2005
- Current status: Online (Note: The website is currently online, but the original Netdisaster engine has been removed.)

Netdisaster was a prank website that could simulate "disasters", such as meteors, UFOs, and spilled coffee, onto a screenshot of any given website. From February 8, 2005, to April 19, 2009, users of the website generated 111,669,334 disasters. The website won the Yahoo! UK & Ireland Finds of the Year 2005 award for Best Innovative Website.

== History ==
Netdisaster creator Denis Rionnet registered the domain "netdisaster.com" on January 25, 2005. The online engine became available at 3:00pm on February 8, 2005, with only five disasters available. Buzz about the website spread rapidly on the internet in the following months. On May 27, Rionnet added the "Netdisaster-Yourself" feature, which creates HTML codes for webmasters to allow their visitors to "destroy" their websites. By July 15, ten million disasters had been generated on the website.

On January 26, 2006, as a result of Netdisaster's growing popularity, the website was named the Yahoo! UK & Ireland Finds of the Year 2005 Best Innovative Website. From 2006 to 2010, a Led Zeppelin disaster was added as part of an online marketing campaign by British-based Rubber Republic. In 2007, PC Magazine included it in their "Best of the Internet" list of websites. On August 6, 2008, one hundred million disasters had been generated.

Difficulties began on September 4, 2008, when RSA Security, a security issues company working for Yahoo!, threatened Netdisaster and its hosting provider, Lunarpages, with legal action, claiming that the "Text Sucker" disaster was being used for phishing. Per RSA's request, the website was shut down and Rionnet sent them the source code of the disaster engine. At that point, Netdisaster user Ronaldo Cardonetti of Abusando.org emailed the security company to tell them they had made a mistake. On October 6, 2008, RSA emailed Rionnet to apologize, after having realized their error. The website was brought back online about ten days later; however, users could no longer create disasters on any Yahoo! websites, nor could they share disasters they had created.

On April 20, 2009, Netdisaster received another legal threat, this time from eBay. eBay complained about a specific URL at netdisaster.com. The page, which showed the "Graffiti" disaster on the eBay website, was suspected of being used for phishing. Unlike Yahoo!, eBay did not examine the website's source code to verify their claim, and thus the website's engine is still offline. However, after receiving support and fan mail from hundreds of users, Rionnet decided that he couldn't stand for Netdisaster to be dead. He created a desktop version of the engine, which allows users to run many of the original disasters on a screenshot of their desktop instead of one of a website. He also made the original browser-based disasters available to webmasters who wanted to add them to their own sites with the "Netdisaster-Yourself!" tool.

On July 25, 2010, a fan-made extension for Google Chrome called "NetDisaster Loader" was posted to the Chrome Web Store that made the "Netdisaster-Yourself!" available for users to access on any website. This effectively made it possible for Chrome users to utilize Netdisaster in the same way they had before the engine was taken offline. The extension received a mention on the Netdisaster home page.

== Use ==
Before the website's engine was shut down, users could choose from a list of disasters and the entire internet. (Note: After October 16, 2008, websites owned by Yahoo! were not available.) Users could type in any URL, select a disaster from a drop-down list, and click "Go!". The disasters were divided into six categories, each one containing a variety of different options. Most of the disasters have been made available on the desktop application and the "Netdisaster-Yourself!" tool.

Nature

- Meteors
- Flood
- Flower Power

Technology

- Led Zeppelin *
- Nuke
- Mars Attacks!
- Graffiti
- Screenshaver
- Gun
- Bloody Gun
- Paintball
- Chainsaw

Life Forms

- Dinosaurs
- Wasps
- Flies
- Ants
- Snail
- Worms
- Mold

Home, Office

- Scribbling baby
- Fried Eggs
- Spilled Coffee
- Slow Burn
- Tomatoes
- Cream Pie

Miscellaneous

- Demonstration
- God Almighty
- Text Sucker*

Dirty

- Cow Dung
- Dog Poop
- Pee
- Acid Pee
- Vomit (yuk!)

*Not available on the desktop application or "Netdisaster-Yourself!" tool.
