= Weird SoundCloud =

Genre of parody music, usually associated with SoundCloud

Weird SoundCloud, or SoundClown, is a mashup parody music scene taking place on the online distribution platform SoundCloud. The scene has been described by its producers and music journalists to be a satirical take on electronic dance music, and useless, throwaway internet content. One critic, Audra Schroeder, categorized it as an in-joke that is "deconstructing and reshaping memes and popular music, recontextualizing the sacred texts of millennial chat rooms."

== Origins ==
In a January 2014 interview, DJ Kevin Wang suggested that the Weird SoundCloud has "been around in the last one to two years", but started to gain much more popularity the previous year through electronic dance music internet blogs. Weird SoundCloud producer Ideaot suggested that some in the phenomenon came from the YouTube poop scene. Another producer in the community, DJ @@ (AT-AT), reasoned that producers joining the scene "want to express their musicality, see it as a more mature form of YouTube Poop," or are "just looking for recognition on social media sites." AT-AT said that it was "a fun thing to do, and after I stopped making proper music I felt I needed a bit of an outlet for my creativity. The fact that people enjoyed it and/or treated it as a travesty (Direct quote from one of my tracks) spurs me on."

== Characteristics ==
Weird SoundCloud is a mash-up and parody music genre labeled by journalist Audra Schroeder as an in-joke that is "deconstructing and reshaping memes and popular music, recontextualizing the sacred texts of millennial chat rooms." Most tracks range from around 30 seconds to one minute in length. The people who make weird SoundCloud are known as SoundClowns, a term coined by producer Dicksoak. Ideaot described the weird SoundCloud community as "largely just people who are friends with each other."

Noisey critic Ryan Bassil spotlight the variety of music coming out of the weird SoundCloud landscape: "One minute you could be listening to the Seinfeld theme reimagined as an aneurysm inducing dubstep corker, the next, you're recovering from hearing a version of Tenacious D's "Tribute" that's akin to having a stroke." Bassil analyzes that the tracks "often take the past and repurpose it into something that, although not altogether useful, sounds fresh and reflective of the abstract, confusing panoramic that encapsulates the modern internet." Bassil compared the lexicon of SoundClown's track titles to that of Reddit and Twitter users.

According to Dicksoak, most works of the style are critiques of EDM or "are just uploaded because they sound funny." However, Bassil disagreed, writing that there are also many tracks that keep repurposing a certain meme, such as "mom's spaghetti" or the re-use of vocals from recordings by hip hop group Death Grips. He describe the scene's re-use of memes as a satirical take on pointless online content that is only on the internet to "do nothing other than fill the void":

They're changing the format of the original work's intended message or audience - a technique often employed by top-tier digital media companies - and in doing so they're sarcastically, ironically, taking the piss out of what Web 2.0's turned into - an open arena where the most ridiculous, unashamed, often pointless piggy-back content can rack up thousands and thousands of clicks.

== Notable examples ==
There are mash-ups that "disrupt the flow of popular music", in the words of writer Schroeder, such as a Dj Detweiler's diverse set of remixes coined "flutedrop", in which the most intense part of the song gets replaced by a poorly played recorder, like Detweiler's remix of the Miley Cyrus song "Wrecking Ball". Another example of flow disruption would be Shaliek's mashup of music by Bruno Mars and Korn.

In November 2013, Wang released a set of mp3 files on SoundCloud named Best Drops Ever, which included tracks like "A Drop So Epic a Bunch of NYU Bros Already Bought a 3-Day Weekend Pass for It" and "A Drop So Crazy You'll Kill Your Family". All of the tracks start as normal electronic dance music build-ups, before they drop into a "bait and switch" audio or film clip such as Filet-O-Fish commercials, the Whitney Houston song "I Will Always Love You" and the film Bambi (1942) that ruins the anticipation. The collection is a parody of the over-importance and over-focus of the drop and lack of care of the overall quality of a song common in the modern electronic dance music scene. Wang has released more than 45 tracks in the weird SoundCloud, some of them receiving around a million plays.

Subgenres of Weird SoundCloud include Macklecore, mash-ups and remixes that include the works of American hip-hop recording artist Macklemore, and Biggiewave, which include samples of songs from the album Ready to Die (1994) by The Notorious B.I.G.

Common audio and meme sources used include Skrillex, the Martin Garrix track "Animals", Thomas the Tank Engine, Shrek, Macklemore, "Gangnam Style", the Bruno Mars track "Uptown Funk", the Disturbed track "Down with the Sickness", Space Jam, the Childish Gambino track "Bonfire", the Death Grips track "Takyon" and air horn sound effects.

== Reception ==
Bassil praised the SoundClown scene as "loveable and strangely honest", reasoning that it "just reminds me that we're all humans on the internet, all searching for #content that means something, something to connect with, but usually only dredging up bastardised versions of things we've already read, seen, or watched before." Bassil also described the weird SoundCloud as a more successful version of a similar scene known as weird YouTube; the reason for the success of SoundClowns is due to SoundCloud's discovery algorithm: "Small collectives and trends are able to form, and there's an abundance of tracks from artists who are almost forging careers out of it, as opposed to uploading one viral hit." Publications have made lists of weird SoundCloud works, such as BuzzFeed's "23 Of The Weirdest Songs On Soundcloud", Obsev's "Weird SoundCloud Mashups That Must've Been Made While Drunk", and Thump's "9 of the Best and Most Upsetting Soundclowns we Could Find", where writer Isabelle Hellyer called it the "most influential genre of music in human history." A Your EDM writer called it "oddly addicting."

== See also ==
- Weird Twitter
- Alt TikTok
- Dariacore
- Hyperpop
- Plunderphonics
- Remix culture
- Sound collage
- YouTube poop
