= The Junipers =

British pop band

- Origin: Leicester, UK
- Genres: Folk pop, psychedelic pop
- Years active: 2000 – present
- Labels: San Remo Records; Sugarbush Records

The Junipers are a psychedelic pop band based in Leicester.

== History ==
The Junipers formed in Leicester in 2005, recorded and released their debut album Cut Your Key in 2008. The album was self-produced and recorded at The Junipers own studio in Leicester & at Magic Garden Studios in Wolverhampton. Three singles were pulled from the album, "Gordie Can't Swim", "So the Feeling Looms"/"Out My Pocket" & "Callooh Callay!", which earned the band single of the week on BBC Radio 2.

A new lineup of the band began recording their follow up to Cut Your Key later that year.

The Junipers second album Paint the Ground was released in 2012.

In 2013 the band released an extended player The Juniper's Euphonious Trolley – EP 1 which they described as a "poppy side project". This came out in November 2013, receiving a top review in Shindig! magazine.

The band released their third album Red Bouquet Fair in 2016 and followed that up with a fourth album Imaginary Friends in 2024.

== Discography ==
- 28 October 2008 – Cut Your Key (Album) – San Remo Records
- 04 August 2008 – "Callooh Callay!" (Single) – San Remo Records
- 08 December 2008 – "Gordie Can't Swim" (Single) – San Remo Records
- 17 August 2009 – "So the Feeling Looms"/"Out My Pocket" (Single) – San Remo Records
- 20 February 2012 – Paint the Ground (Album) – Sugarbush Records
- 20 November 2013 – The Junipers' Euphonious Trolley – EP1
- 30 June 2016 – Red Bouquet Fair (Album) Sugarbush Records
- 11 July 2024 – "Annie Almond" (Single) – Cuckoo Records
- 01 August 2024 – "She Looked Up At the Stars" (Single) – Cuckoo Records
- 05 September 2024 – Imaginary Friends (Album) Cuckoo Records
