= Juniper Publishers =

Academic publisher

- Headquarters location: Irvine, California
- Distribution: Simon & Schuster
- Publication types: Academic journals
- Official website: juniperpublishers.com

Juniper Publishers is a publisher of various academic journals. It has a postal address in Irvine, California, USA, located in a residential neighborhood but has employees in Hyderabad, India. Juniper Publishers has been included on Beall's List of potential predatory open-access publishers, and has faced other criticisms of its publishing practices.

== Activities ==
Juniper Publishers has been active at least since 2015. The company uses an Open Access model of publishing, which charges the authors. Articles are distributed online and free of cost or other barriers. The company claims that articles are peer reviewed before publication. In 2022 the company published about 75 journals in the fields of clinical and medical science, life sciences, chemistry, engineering, and pharma. As of 2022, most of its journals do not have a scientific editor in chief. Juniper Publishers' journals are not listed in Clarivate's Web of Science, which calculates Impact factors for scientific journals; nevertheless Juniper Publishers displays so-called Impact Factors for its journals, whose origins are not explained. Its journals are not indexed in National Library of Medicine's MEDLINE, but articles are included in PubMed Central and may be accessed through the PubMed access platform.

== Criticism ==
Juniper Publishers was listed in Beall's List of potential predatory open-access publishers. The company has been criticized for sending out email spam to scientists, calling for papers, and for publishing at least one paper that violated research integrity (missing conflict of interest statement, missing informed consent by patients, and plagiarism).

In 2020, two biologists published a non-sensical study in Juniper's Oceanography & Fisheries Open Access Journal, which amongst other included the claim that barn swallows and flying fish are sister lineages, thus demonstrating that the peer review promised by the publisher and paid by the customers was non-existent or deeply flawed.

Keith Taber, Emeritus Professor of Science Education at the University of Cambridge, analysed several articles from an author named Rahul Hajare. These articles were characterized by "titles not reflecting the paper, abstracts that do not actually discuss the study, conflation of unrelated topics, nonsensical sentences that any editor or reviewer should ask to be revised/corrected, glaring inconsistencies, and citing only his own publications", and had been published in Juniper's journals Advanced Research in Gastroenterology & Hepatology, Trends in Technical & Scientific Research, Advances in Biotechnology & Microbiology, and Organic & Medicinal Chemistry International Journal.

== Journals ==
- Academic Journal of Pediatrics & Neonatology
- Academic Journal of Polymer Science
- Advanced Research in Gastroenterology & Hepatology
- Advances in Biotechnology & Microbiology
- Advances in Dentistry & Oral Health
- Agricultural Research & Technology Open Access Journal
- Anatomy Physiology & Biochemistry International Journal
- Annals of Reviews and Research
- Annals of Social Sciences & Management Studies
- Archives of Animal & Poultry Sciences
- Biostatistics and Biometrics Open Access Journal
- Cancer Therapy & Oncology International Journal
- Civil Engineering Research Journal
- Current Research in Diabetes & Obesity Journal
- Current Trends in Biomedical Engineering & Biosciences
- Current Trends in Clinical & Medical Imaging
- Current Trends in Fashion Technology & Textile Engineering
- Ecology & Conservation Science: Open Access
- Engineering Technology Open Access Journal
- Global Journal of Addiction & Rehabilitation Medicine
- Global Journal of Archaeology & Anthropology
- Global Journal of Intellectual & Developmental Disabilities
- Global Journal of Nanomedicine
- Global Journal of Otolaryngology
- Global Journal of Pharmacy & Pharmaceutical Sciences
- Global Journal of Reproductive Medicine
- Insights in Mining Science & Technology
- International Journal of Cell Science & Molecular Biology
- International Journal of Environmental Sciences & Natural Resources
- International Journal of Pulmonary & Respiratory Sciences
- JOJ Dermatology & Cosmetics
- JOJ Horticulture & Arboriculture
- JOJ Internal Medicine
- JOJ Nursing & Health Care
- JOJ Ophthalmology
- JOJ Sciences
- JOJ Urology & Nephrology
- JOJ Wildlife & Biodiversity
- Journal of Anesthesia & Intensive Care Medicine
- Journal of Cardiology & Cardiovascular Therapy
- Journal of Child & Adolescent Dentistry
- Journal of Complementary Medicine & Alternative Healthcare
- Journal of Dairy & Veterinary Sciences
- Journal of Endocrinology and Thyroid Research
- Journal of Forensic Sciences & Criminal Investigation
- Journal of Gynecology and Women's Health
- Journal of Head Neck & Spine Surgery
- Journal of Pharmacology & Clinical Research
- Journal of Physical Fitness, Medicine & Treatment in Sports
- Journal of Tumor Medicine & Prevention
- Journal of Yoga and Physiotherapy
- Juniper Online Journal Material Science
- Juniper Online Journal of Case Studies
- Juniper Online Journal of Immuno Virology
- Juniper Online Journal of Orthopedic & Orthoplastic Surgery
- Juniper Online Journal of Public Health
- Modern Applications of Bioequivalence & Bioavailability
- Novel Approaches in Drug Designing & Development
- Novel Techniques in Arthritis & Bone Research
- Nutrition and Food Science International Journal
- Oceanography & Fisheries Open Access Journal
- Open Access Blood Research & Transfusion Journal
- Open Access Journal of Gerontology & Geriatric Medicine
- Open Access Journal of Neurology & Neurosurgery
- Open Access Journal of Surgery
- Open Access Journal of Toxicology
- Organic & Medicinal Chemistry International Journal
- Orthopedics and Rheumatology Open Access Journal
- Palliative Medicine & Care International Journal
- Prospects of Mechanical Engineering & Technology
- Psychology and Behavioral Science International Journal
- Recent Advances in Petrochemical Science
- Robotics & Automation Engineering Journal
- Theranostics of Brain, Spine & Neural Disorders
- Trends in Technical & Scientific Research
