= Junlper =

American X user (born 1995)

JUNlPER
- Twitter profile picture of the @JUNlPER account, created by @PfpDrawer
- Born: November 1, 1995 (age 31)
- Years active: 2019–present
- Known for: X shitposting

June Sternbach, also known as Junlper (stylized as JUNlPER; (Note: Stylized with a lowercase "L" instead of an uppercase "i") (Note: She is also known as June, Juniper (with an 'i' rather than a lowercase 'L'), pudding person, transgender marx, and transsexual marx.) born November 1, 1995), is an American left-wing social media personality, podcaster, and social media editor for The Onion. Sternbach rose to prominence in the early 2020s for shitposting on Twitter/X, especially using satirical screenshots of fabricated news stories. She is credited with popularizing the term "goblin mode" and creating a viral hoax about the "dick vein" being removed from Snickers candy bars.

In October 2023, after satirically suggesting that the site's owner Elon Musk was a pedophile to protest an X.com policy that removed headlines from posted articles, Sternbach's multiple accounts were suspended.

== Social media activity ==
Sternbach created her Twitter account in early 2019 to support the 2020 presidential campaign of Bernie Sanders, but later pivoted towards mocking people she considered her political enemies. Her original account's profile falsely claimed that she was a reporter for The New York Times.

=== Popularizing "Goblin Mode" ===
In February 2022, Sternbach made a tweet featuring an edited Fox News headline of an interview with the American actress Julia Fox, purporting her to have used the phrase "goblin mode". The image prompted a large increase in online searches for 'goblin mode', and led Fox to respond, saying, "Just for the record. I have never used the term 'goblin mode'". In 2022, Sternbach defined goblin mode as "the opposite of trying to better yourself".

In June 2022, the term was defined by Dictionary.com as "a slang term for a way of behaving that intentionally and shamelessly gives in to and indulges in base habits and activities without regard for adhering to social norms or expectations". In December 2022, online respondents selected the term from Oxford Languages' shortlist, which also included metaverse and #IStandWith, as the Word of the Year. Oxford Languages attributed the spike in the phrase's popularity to Sternbach's tweet.

=== Snickers "dick vein" ===
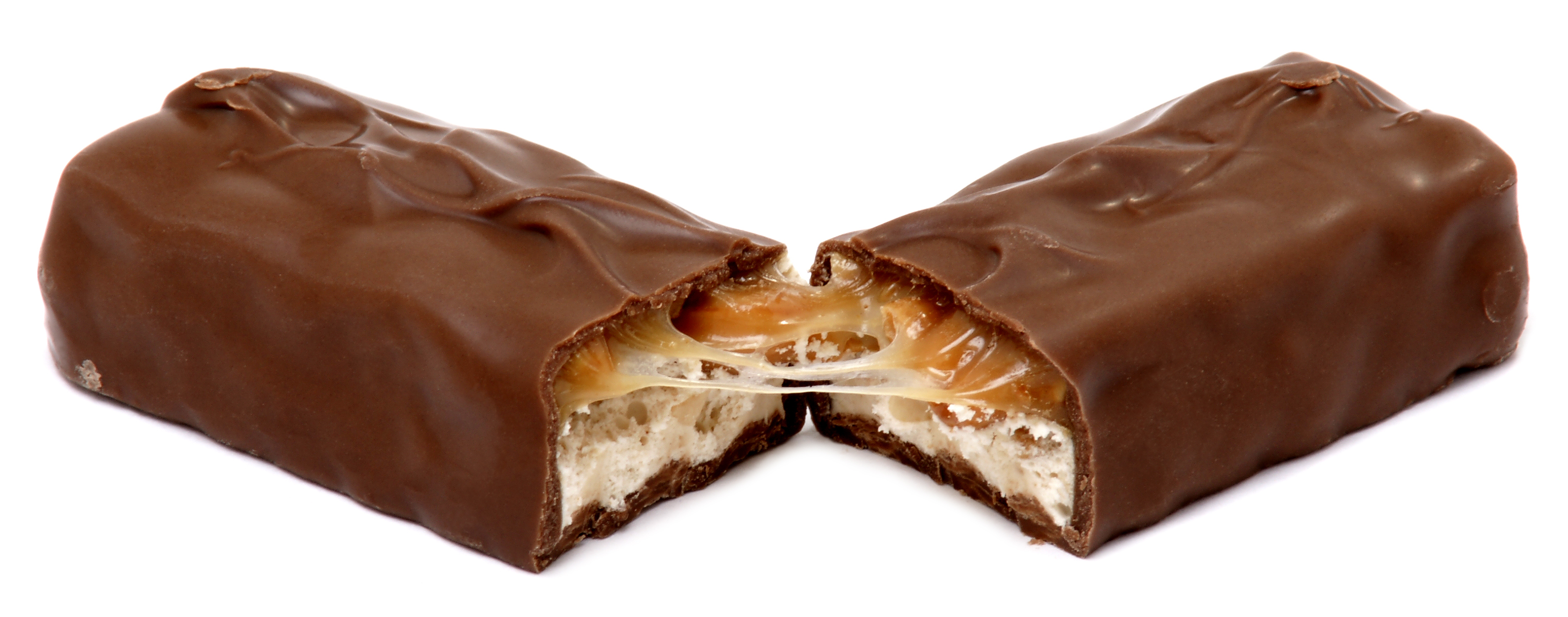
A split-in-half Snickers bar with the "dick vein" showing

In April 2022, Sternbach satirically claimed in a tweet that Snickers was removing the "dick vein" design from the top of the candy bar, prompting a backlash from unwitting Snickers fans. Due to the volume of response, Snickers clarified in its own viral tweet that the "veins remain". The tweet spawned follow-up hoaxes including a viral fake image of Tucker Carlson talking about the "dick veins" on his Fox News show, alluding to Carlson's comments about "unsexy" M&M's characters earlier that year.

=== Other tweets ===
In response to a December 2022 Elon Musk joke that his preferred gender pronouns were "Prosecute/Fauci", Sternbach responded that "we didn't ask for your woke pronouns", alluding to Musk's views on transgender issues.

In February 2023, Sternbach said that controversy regarding the 2023 Hogwarts Legacy video game was manufactured in terms of 'TERFs' pointing out the games' success despite boycotts. She also said that despite saying that people should feel free to buy it, they should not attempt to get "good ally points" for disliking J. K. Rowling. Later, in June of that year, Sternbach criticized U.S. states that prohibit medical gender transitioning for adults.

Other posts in 2023 included calling YouTuber MrBeast "demonic" and creating a fake image of a Walmart "product zoner" job after he suggested that his fans should arrange his Feastables chocolate brand and disarrange Hershey's chocolate bars displays in stores, accusing MrBeast of lying about being invited on the Titan before its implosion, and falsely claiming that US President Joe Biden had been removed from the White House in a body bag.

=== Suspension from X ===
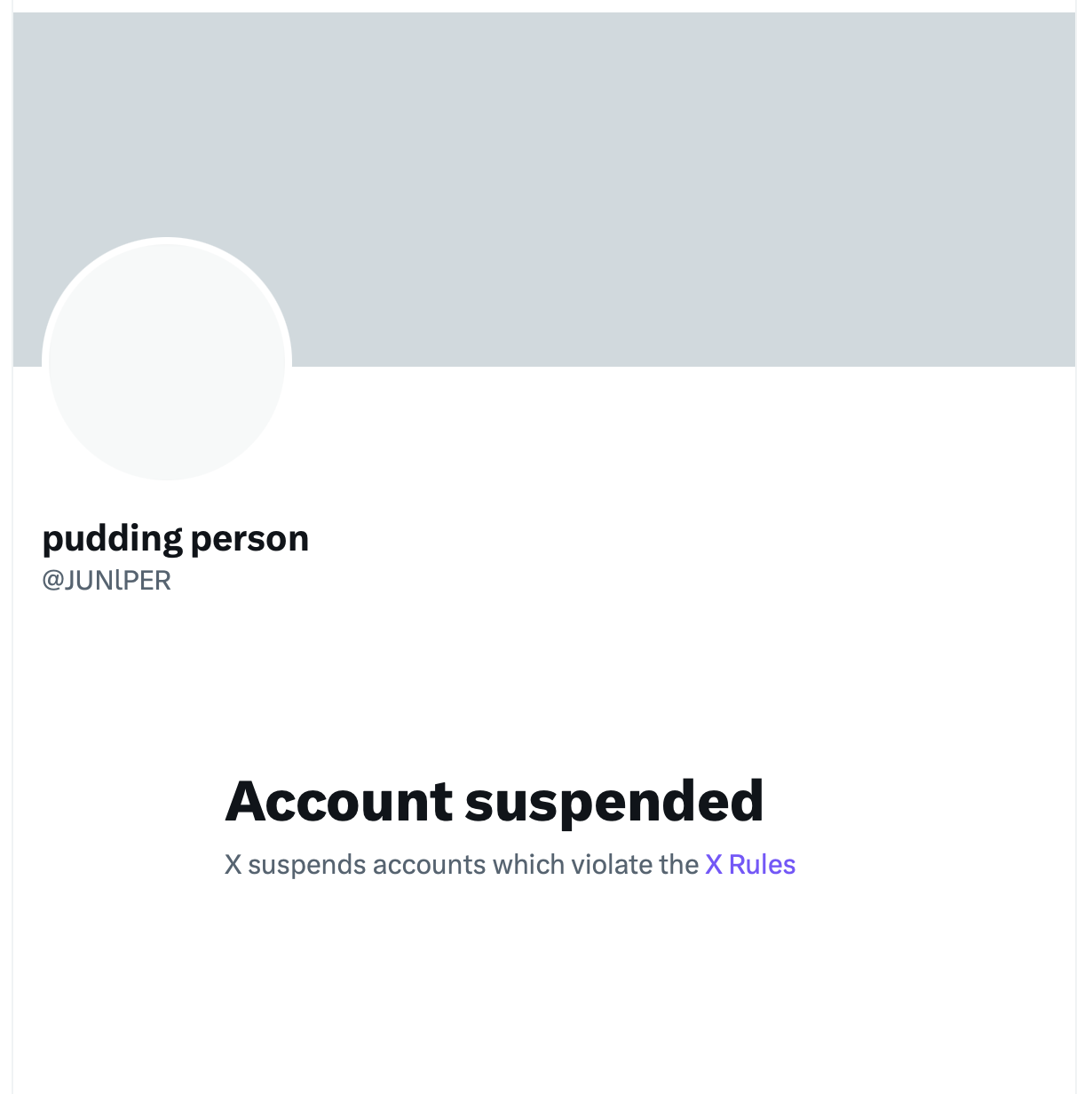
@JUNlPER's page on October 6, 2023

On October 6, 2023, Sternbach was suspended from X. The previous day, an update to X had removed headlines from posts which link to news articles. In response, Sternbach exploited this to make a satirical tweet in which she claimed that "growing evidence [suggested] that" Musk was a pedophile. Sternbach and her secondary account were terminated hours later, for which no official reason was given. Several other accounts made by her were also banned in the following days. In November, she created the account @CantEverDie, which as of March 2025 has not been suspended and is currently active. (Note: "i haven't officially announced it here but my current twitter account is @canteverdie if anyone here still uses twitter too". bsky.app. Junlper. January 19, 2024.)

The move to ban Sternbach was condemned by journalists Erin Reed and Ben Collins, as well as civil rights attorney Alejandra Caraballo. The move was supported by Chaya Raichik of Libs of TikTok. Mike Masnick of Techdirt contrasted the suspension with Musk's previous claims of being a "free speech absolutist". The Messenger described the incident as Musk banning "a popular poster who skewered him". The Advocate framed the incident as Musk and Chaya Raichik teaming up on Sternbach. NBC News listed Junlper as an example of suspended leftist accounts under Musk.

A 2024 commentary article in the Postdigital Science and Education journal characterized Junlper's post as an example of weaponized multimodality in service of protesting site governance.

== The Onion ==
In September 2024 Sternbach began contributing to The Onion, and is currently a social media editor for the organization.

== Podcasting ==
Sternbach co-hosts internet culture podcast Kill the Computer, formerly known as Western Kabuki, and Ill-Conceived, a podcast about natalism, marriage and mothering including the tradwife phenomenon.

== Personal life ==
Prior to 2026, Sternbach was a food inspector for the state of Wisconsin. She is a transgender woman. She has been described as a leftist and identifies as a Marxist. She is a member of the Democratic Socialists of America.
