= Barbara Comyns =

English writer and artist (1907–1992)

- Born: Barbara Irene Veronica Bayley; 27 December 1907; Bidford-on-Avon, Warwickshire, England, UK
- Died: 14 July 1992 (aged 84); Stanton upon Hine Heath, Shropshire, England, UK
- Occupations: writer, artist
- Spouses: John Francis Pemberton (m. 1931, divorced); Richard Strettell Comyns Carr (m. 1945)
- Children: 2
- Writing career
- Genre: English literature
- Notable work: The Vet's Daughter (1959)

Barbara Irene Veronica Comyns Carr (born Barbara Irene Veronica Bayley; 27 December 1907 – 14 July 1992), known as Barbara Comyns, was an English writer and artist.

== Early life ==
Born in Bidford-on-Avon, Warwickshire, to Margaret Eva Mary (née Fenn) and Albert Edward Bayley, Comyns was the fourth of six children. The family home was Bell Court, a manor on the banks of the River Avon. Her father was a Birmingham brewer and industrialist who died in 1922 when she was 15.

== Artist ==
After her father's death, Bell Court was sold and Comyns left to attend art school, first in nearby Stratford-upon-Avon, then she moved to London to attend Heatherley School of Fine Art. In 1931 she married fellow artist and childhood friend John Pemberton, nephew of the London Group president and noted artist Rupert Lee. Comyns and her husband exhibited their work with the London Group of artists in November 1934. Comyns mixed amongst the artistic community of London and she knew Dylan Thomas and Augustus John. They had two children (a son, Julian, and a daughter, Caroline), but the marriage broke down around 1935.

During the late 1930s, Comyns began a relationship with the black-marketeer Arthur Price. The couple lived with Comyns's two children at various London addresses. Comyns generated money by modelling, converting houses into apartments, breeding poodles, renovating pianos, dealing in antique furniture and classic cars and drawing for commercial advertisements. With the outbreak of World War II, Comyns's poverty increased and her relationship with Arthur broke down. Comyns became a cook in a Hertfordshire country house, where she wrote a series of vignettes about her childhood.

== Writer ==
Comyns returned to London with her family in 1942. During the war, she met Richard Strettell Comyns Carr (the son of the barrister and Liberal MP Arthur Strettell Comyns Carr and the grandson of the dramatist Joseph Comyns Carr). Richard was employed in the Iberian subsection of MI6's Section V with Kim Philby and Graham Greene. They married in 1945. During their honeymoon, Comyns conceived the idea for The Vet's Daughter in a dream and wrote an outline.

While Comyns was writing Our Spoons Came from Woolworths, a friend found the manuscript she had written in Hertfordshire and encouraged her to publish it. Five of the stories were published in Lilliput between May 1945 and August 1946 as extracts from "the novel nobody will publish", with the manuscript later published in whole as Sisters by a River in 1947 by Eyre & Spottiswoode while Graham Greene was director there under Douglas Jerrold. Both Lilliput and Eyre & Spottiswoode left her non-standard spelling intact.

Her second novel, Our Spoons Came from Woolworths, was accepted for publishing at the same time as her first. Greene later described her to Max Reinhardt as "a crazy but interesting novelist whom I started when I was at Eyre & Spottiswoode but whom Jerrold abandoned with all my other authors [...] when I left".

After reading about the 1951 Pont-Saint-Esprit mass poisoning, Comyns wrote her third novel, Who Was Changed and Who Was Dead.

In 1956, Richard was laid off because of his association with Kim Philby. The Comyns Carrs moved to Spain and lived briefly on Ibiza until 1958 and then in Barcelona, from where she published The Vet's Daughter; Out of the Red, Into the Blue; The Skin Chairs; Birds in Tiny Cages; and A Touch of Mistletoe. These were published through Heinemann, via a recommendation from Greene to his friend A. S. Frere, the managing editor there. In 1969, after Frere had left Heinemann's, an early version of The House of Dolls was turned down by the publisher. Greene did not like it either. Discouraged, Comyns chose not to send it to other publishers.

After living in Barcelona for 16 years, they moved to San Roque in Andalusia. In 1974, with increasing inflation in Spain and a decline in the pound, the couple returned to England, moving first to Twickenham, and later, Richmond.

The Vet's Daughter was serialised in BBC radio and adapted into the 1978 musical The Clapham Wonder by Sandy Wilson.

There was renewed interest in her work when Virago began to reprint some of her novels in the 1980s, which Greene had also recommended to Carmen Callil.

In the 1980s, Comyns published three more novels: The Juniper Tree, Mr. Fox (written in the 1940s), and The House of Dolls (written in the 1960s).

== Death and legacy ==
Comyns died in Stanton upon Hine Heath in Shropshire, in 1992. She is buried in St. Andrew's Churchyard. The Times, The Independent and The Guardian carried obituaries of her life.

In 2024, a biography, Barbara Comyns: A Savage Innocence by Avril Horner, was published by Manchester University Press.

== Bibliography ==
Novels

- Sisters by a River (Eyre & Spottiswoode, 1947; Virago, 1985)
- Our Spoons Came from Woolworths (Eyre & Spottiswoode, 1950; Virago, 1983; New York Review Books, 2015)
- Who Was Changed and Who Was Dead (The Bodley Head, 1954; Virago, 1987; Dorothy, 2010; Daunt Books, 2021, ISBN 978-1-911547-84-6)
- The Vet's Daughter (Heinemann, 1959; Virago, 1981; New York Review Books, 2003)
- Out of the Red, Into the Blue (Heinemann, 1960)
- The Skin Chairs (Heinemann, 1962; Virago, 1986)
- Birds in Tiny Cages (Heinemann, 1964)
- A Touch of Mistletoe (Heinemann, 1967; Virago, 1989; Daunt Books, 2021)
- The Juniper Tree (Methuen/St. Martin's Press, 1985; New York Review Books, 2018)
- Mr. Fox (Methuen, 1987; Turnpike Books, 2020, ISBN 1916254721)
- The House of Dolls (Methuen, 1989; St. Martin's Press, 1990; Turnpike Books, 2020, ISBN 978-1-916254-71-8 )

Short stories (published as Barbara Pemberton)

- "The Roly-Poly Field". Lilliput (May 1945), Vol. 16, No. 5, #95, p. 342.
- "Courious Habits of Bats, Moths and Earwigs". Lilliput (July 1945), Vol. 17, No. 1, #97, pp. 51–52.
- "Good Luck Numbers". Lilliput (September 1945), Vol. 17, No. 3, #99, p. 247.
- "God in the Billard Room". Lilliput (November 1945), Vol. 17, No. 5, #101, p. 375.
- "Black Monday". Lilliput (August 1946), Vol. 19, No. 2, #110, p. 153.
