= Juniper Lake (Nova Scotia) =

Juniper Lake (Nova Scotia) could refer to the following:

== Colchester County ==
- Juniper Lake located at 45°35′27″N 63°29′6″W

== Guysborough County ==
- Juniper Lake located at 45°16′40″N 61°23′30″W
- Juniper Lake located at 45°17′48″N 61°38′35″W
- Juniper Lake located at 45°6′56″N 62°12′11″W

== Halifax Regional Municipality ==
- Juniper Lake located at 44°50′48″N 63°31′56″W
- Juniper Lake located at 44°43′8″N 63°34′29″W

== Lunenburg County ==
- Juniper Lake located at 44°41′9″N 64°32′12″W
