= Players' Theatre =

Theatre in London

Coordinates: 51.508099°N 0.124134°W

- Interactive map of Players' Theatre
- Address: Villiers Street; Westminster, London

Construction
- Opened: February 1946
- Closed: 2002

The Players' Theatre was a London theatre which opened at 43 King Street, Covent Garden, on 18 October 1936. The club originally mounted period-style musical comedies, introducing Victorian-style music hall in December 1937. The threat of World War II German bombing prompted a move in October 1940 to a basement at 13 Albemarle Street, Piccadilly, and then, after the cessation of hostilities, to Villiers Street, Charing Cross, opening on 14 February 1946.

Hackney ARP Warden diarist, Thomas E. Browne visited the Players Club Albemarle St, on Friday 28 January 1944 with Mary his fiancée, saying, “people interested in the old Music Hall gather together to enjoy themselves in the manner of 50 years ago. Very interesting & highly amusing. The performers very slightly burlesque their parts, and the proceedings are enlivened by comments from the audience, who sit round tables - eat & drink. Dancing to a gramophone there was an “unnatural disturbance” outside - meaning an air raid". They continued and heard absolutely nothing.

Other intermediate locations of the theatre included the Arts Theatre and the St John's Wood private residence of a member, Francis Iles (Anthony Berkeley). Overwhelmed by debt, the theatre closed in 2002, although the Players' Theatre Club continues to perform music hall shows in other venues.

Appearing at the Players' Theatre were Leonard Sachs (who was often the chairman), Patricia Hayes, Hattie Jacques, James Robertson Justice, Peter Ustinov, Clive Dunn, Ian Carmichael, Joan Sterndale-Bennett, Vida Hope and Denis Martin, who eventually became Director of Production.

In 1967, Decca Records issued an LP, A Night of Music Hall: from The Players' Theatre (London's Victorian Theatre), with 19 songs and duets encompassing a typical evening at the Players, chaired by Don Gemell. The recorded artists were Stella Moray, Maurice Browning, Margaret Burton, Patsy Rowlands, Hattie Jacques, John Rutland, Joan Sterndale Bennett, Josephine Gordon, Robin Hunter, Daphne Anderson, Clive Dunn and Bill Owen, with Peter Greenwell and Geoffrey Brawn (piano). At the time of the recording the membership of the theatre club was over 5,000.

The name of the nightly show was Late Joys which derived from a hotel on the site of the building at 43 King Street: "Evans – Late Joy's", Joy having been the owner of the song and supper room before a comedian from Covent Garden, Evans, took over.

Following the closure of the theatre, the Players' Theatre Club continues to perform music hall shows throughout the year in other venues such as the Museum of Comedy, the Royal Oak pub in Tabard Street and the Royal Air Force Club in Piccadilly. The theatre at Villers Street was later refurbished and is now the Charing Cross Theatre.
