= Extremely online =

Phenomenon of over-engaging with Internet culture

An extremely online, terminally online, or chronically online person is someone who is closely and consistently engaged with the Internet and Internet culture. People who are extremely online often believe that their own online activity, or what they see online, is important enough to the point where it interferes with their offline life. Events and phenomena can themselves be extremely online; while often used as a descriptive term, the phenomenon of extreme online usage has been described as "both a reformation of the delivery of ideas – shared through words and videos and memes and GIFs and copypasta – and the ideas themselves". The term "extremely online" or similar variants are sometimes used as pejoratives and insults.

== Criteria ==
While the term was in use as early as 2014, it gained popularity over the latter half of the 2010s in conjunction with the increasing prevalence and notability of Internet phenomena in all areas of life. Extremely online people, according to The Daily Dot, are interested in topics "no normal, healthy person could possibly care about", and have been analogized to "pop culture fandoms, just without the pop". Extremely online phenomena such as fan culture and reaction GIFs have been described as "swallowing democracy" by journalists such as Amanda Hess in The New York Times, who claimed that a "great convergence between politics and culture, values and aesthetics, citizenship and commercialism" had become "a dominant mode of experiencing politics". Vulture – formerly the pop culture section of New York magazine, now a stand-alone website – has a section for articles tagged "extremely online".

== Historical background ==
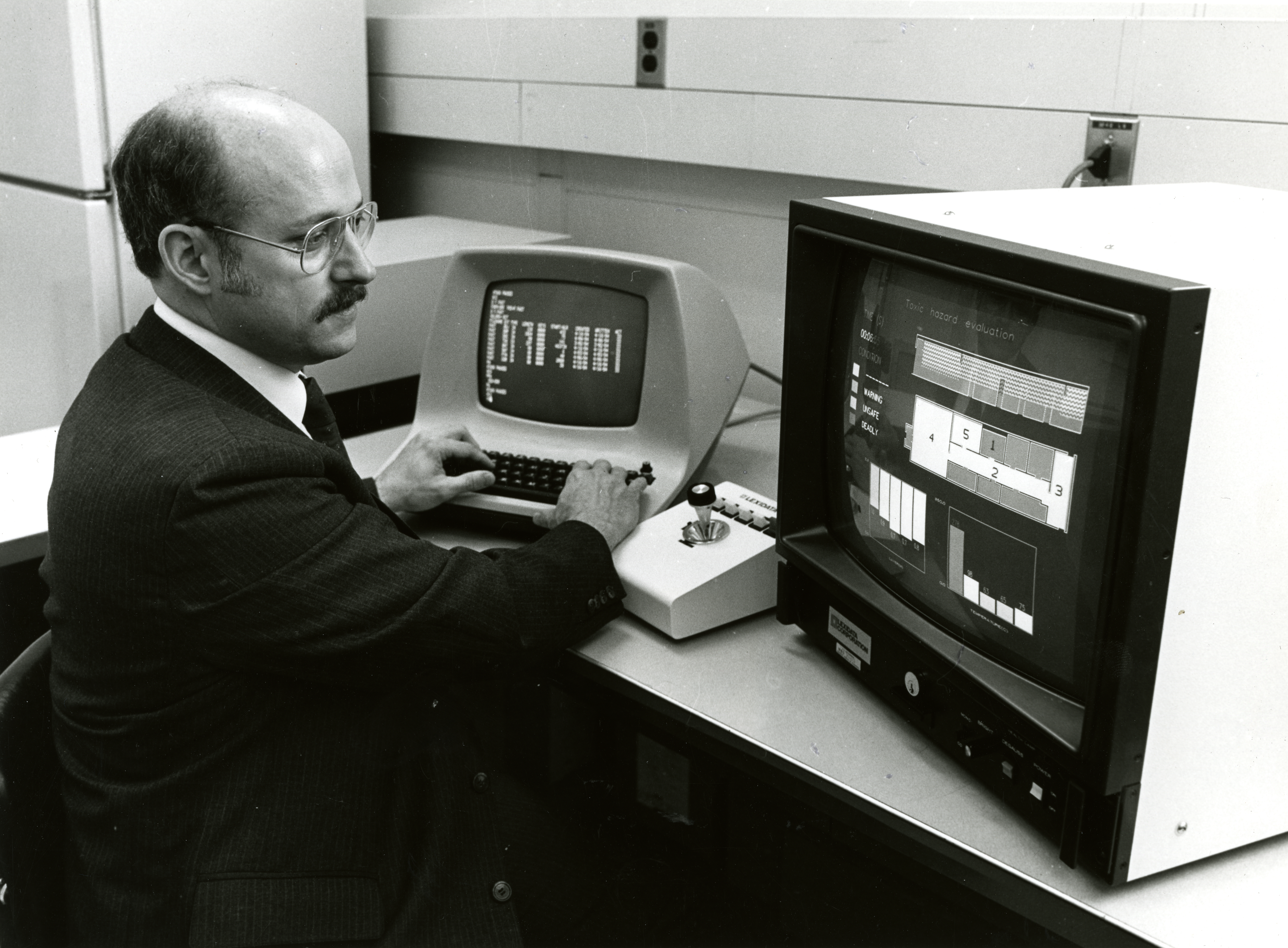
While computer networks existed in the 1980s, they were largely seen at the time as something whose only formal or culturally significant use was for research and business purposes; entertainment and snark on bulletin board systems and Usenet was viewed as small-time geek culture.

In the 2010s, many categories and labels came into wide use from media outlets to describe Internet-mediated cultural trends, such as the alt-right, the dirtbag left, and doomerism. These ideological categories are often defined by their close association with online discourse. For example, the term "alt-right" was added to the Associated Press' stylebook in 2016 to describe the "digital presence" of far-right ideologies, the dirtbag left refers to a group of "underemployed and overly online millennials" who "have no time for the pieties of traditional political discourse", and the doomer's "blackpilled despair" is combined with spending "too much time on message boards in high school" to produce an eclectic "anti-socialism".

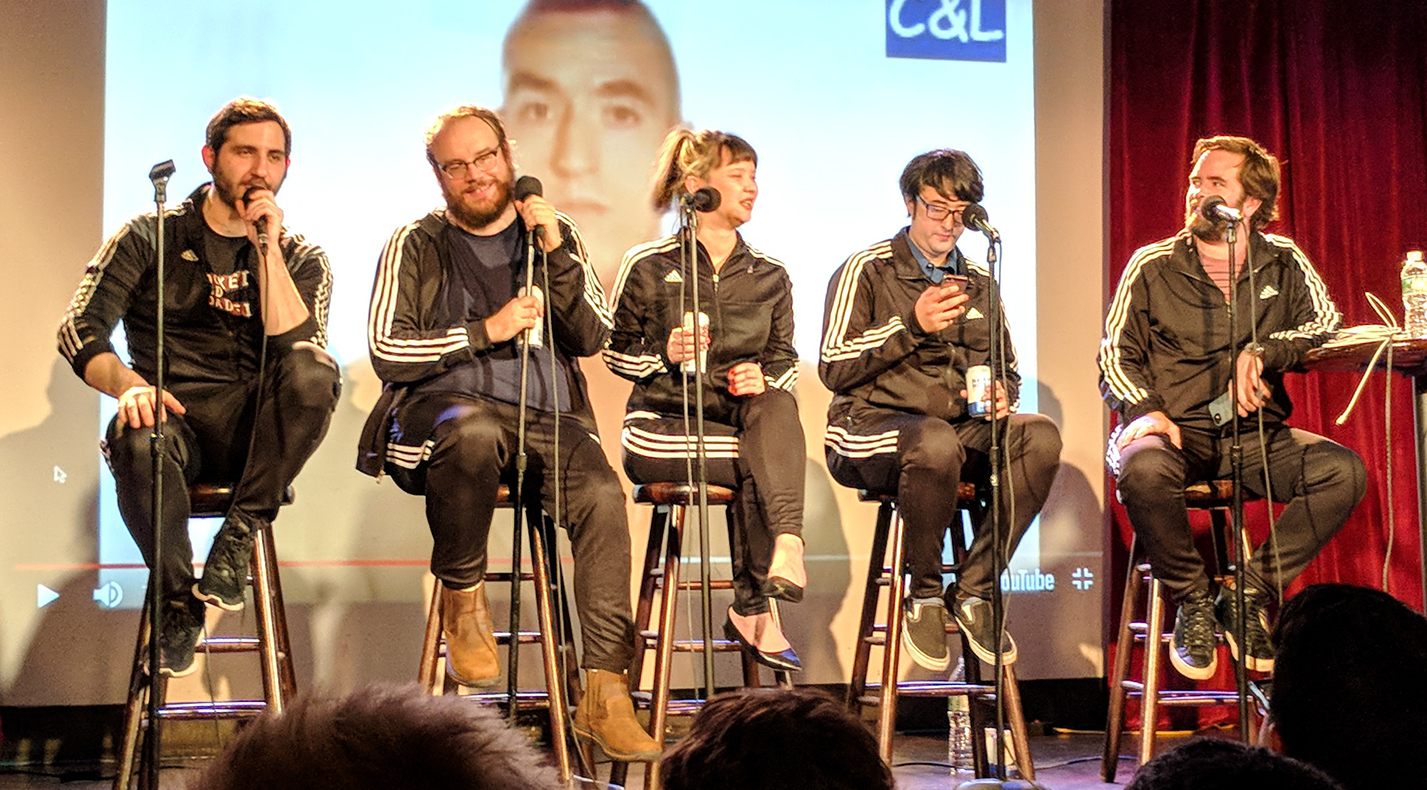
Fans of the podcast Chapo Trap House have been described as extremely online.

Extreme onlineness transcends ideological boundaries. For example, right-wing figures like Alex Jones and Laura Loomer have been described as "extremely online", but so have those on the left like Alexandria Ocasio-Cortez and fans of the Chapo Trap House podcast. Extremely online phenomena can range from acts of offline violence (such as the 2019 Christchurch shootings) to "[going] on NPR to explain the anti-capitalist irony inherent in kids eating Tide Pods".

United States President Donald Trump's posts on social media have been frequently cited as extremely online, during both his presidency and his 2020 presidential campaign; Vox claimed his approach to re-election veered into being "Too Online", and Reason questioned whether the final presidential debate was "incomprehensible to normies". While individual people are often given the description, being extremely online has also been posited as an overall cultural phenomenon, applying to trends like lifestyle movements suffixed with "-wave" and "-core" based heavily on Internet media, as well as an increasing expectation for digital social researchers to have an "online presence" to advance in their careers.

== Participants and media coverage ==
Avatar of wint

wint
(@dril)
tweeted:

who the fuck is scraeming 'LOG OFF' at my house. show yourself, coward. i will never log off

September 15, 2012

One example of a phenomenon considered to be extremely online is the "wife guy" (a guy who posts about his wife); despite being a "stupid online thing" which spent several years as a piece of Internet slang, in 2019 it became the subject of five articles in leading U.S. media outlets.

Like many extremely online phrases and phenomena, the "wife guy" has been attributed in part to the in-character Twitter account dril. The account frequently parodies how people behave on the Internet, and has been widely cited as influential on online culture. In one tweet, his character refuses to stop using the Internet, even when someone shouts outside his house that he should log off.

Many of dril's other coinages have become ubiquitous parts of Internet slang. Throughout the 2010s, posters such as dril inspired commonly used terms like "corncobbing" (referring to someone losing an argument and failing to admit it); while originally a piece of obscure Internet slang used on sites like Twitter, use of the term (and controversy over its misinterpretation) became a subject of reporting from traditional publications, with some noting that keeping up with the rapid turnover of inside jokes, memes, and quotes online required daily attention to avoid embarrassment.

Twitch has been described as "talk radio for the extremely online". Another example of an event cited as extremely online is No Nut November. Increasingly, researchers are expected to have more of an online presence, to advance in their careers, as networking and portfolios continue to transition to the digital world.

In November 2020, an article in The Washington Post criticized the filter bubble theory of online discourse on the basis that it "overgeneralized" based on a "small subset of extremely online people".

The 2021 storming of the United States Capitol was described as extremely online, with "pro-Trump internet personalities", such as Baked Alaska, and fans livestreaming and taking selfies. People who have been described as extremely online include Chrissy Teigen, Jon Ossoff, and Andrew Yang. In contrast, Joe Biden has been cited as the antithesis of extremely online—The New York Times wrote in 2019 that he had "zero meme energy".

== See also ==
- 4chan – Anonymous imageboard website
- Couch potato – Person who spends most of their free time sitting or lying on a couch
- Da share z0ne – Satirical social media user
- Fandom – Subculture composed of fans sharing a common interest
- Geek – Expert or enthusiast obsessed with a hobby or intellectual pursuit
- Glossary of Generation Z slang
- Kill All Normies – 2017 nonfiction book by Angela Nagle
- Neckbeard (slang) – Pejorative term and stereotype for men
- Nerd – Type of person
- Netizen – Person involved in internet communities
- Owning the libs – Strategy of American conservatives
- Post-Internet – 21st century art movement
- Shitposting – Intentionally posting poor-quality social media posts
- Stan Twitter – Online community of Twitter users
- YouTuber – Creator producing YouTube videos
