= Blue check =

Identity management and paid subscription feature on Twitter/X

"Blue checkmark" verification badge, used by X Premium subscribers

Gold badge used for Verified Organizations subscribers

Gray badge used for government accounts

A blue check is used on social media platforms, notably X (formerly known as Twitter), to indicate the authenticity of an account. Since November 2022, Twitter users whose accounts are at least 90 days old and have a verified phone number receive verification upon subscribing to X Premium or Verified Organizations; this status persists as long as the subscription remains active.

When introduced in June 2009, the system provided the site's readers with a means to distinguish genuine notable account holders, such as celebrities and organizations, from impostors or parodies. Until November 2022, a blue checkmark displayed against an account name indicated that Twitter had taken steps to ensure that the account was actually owned by the person or organization whom it claimed to represent. The checkmark does not imply endorsement from Twitter, and does not mean that tweets from a verified account are necessarily accurate or truthful in any way. People with verified accounts on Twitter are often colloquially referred to as "blue checks" on social media and by reporters.

In November 2022, the verification program was modified heavily by new owner Elon Musk, extending verification to any account with a verified phone number and an active subscription to an eligible X Premium (formerly Twitter Blue) plan. These changes faced criticism from users and the media, who believed that the changes would ease impersonation, and allow accounts spreading misleading information to feign credibility. In a related change, Twitter introduced additional gold and gray checkmarks, used by Verified Organizations and government-affiliated accounts, respectively. Twitter claims that the changes to verification are required to "reduce fraudulent accounts and bots".

Twitter users who had been verified through the previous system were known as "legacy verified" accounts; legacy verification was deprecated in April 2023, and stripped from accounts who do not meet the new payment requirements. Musk later implied that he had been personally paying for the X Premium subscriptions of several notable celebrities.

== Until November 2022 ==
In June 2009, after being criticized by Kanye West and sued by Tony La Russa over unauthorized accounts run by impersonators, the company launched their "Verified Accounts" program. Twitter stated that an account with a "blue tick" verification badge indicates "we've been in contact with the person or entity the account is representing and verified that it is approved". After the beta period, the company stated in their FAQ that it "proactively verifies accounts on an ongoing basis to make it easier for users to find who they're looking for" and that they "do not accept requests for verification from the general public". Originally, Twitter took on the responsibility of reaching out to celebrities and other notable people to confirm their identities in order to establish a verified account.

In July 2016, Twitter announced a public application process to grant verified status to an account "if it is determined to be of public interest" and that verification "does not imply an endorsement". In 2016, the company began accepting requests for verification, but it was discontinued the same year. Twitter explained that the volume of requests for verified accounts had exceeded its ability to cope; rather, Twitter determines on its own whom to approach about verified accounts, limiting verification to accounts which are "authentic, notable, and active".

In November 2020, Twitter announced a relaunch of its verification system in 2021. According to the new policy, Twitter verifies six different types of accounts; for three of them (companies, brands, and influential individuals like activists), the existence of a Wikipedia page will be one criterion for showing that the account has "Off Twitter Notability".

=== Controversy ===
On June 21, 2014, actor William Shatner raised an issue with several Engadget editorial staff and their verification status on Twitter. Besides the site's social media editor, John Colucci, Shatner also targeted several junior members of the staff for being "nobodies", unlike some of his actor colleagues who did not bear such distinction. Shatner claimed Colucci and the team were bullying him when giving a text interview to Mashable. Over a month later, Shatner continued to discuss the issue on his Tumblr page, to which Engadget replied by defending its team and discussing the controversy surrounding the social media verification.

Twitter's practice and process for verifying accounts came under scrutiny again in 2017 after the company verified the account of white supremacist and far-right political activist, Jason Kessler. Many who criticized Twitter's decision to verify Kessler's account saw this as a political act on the company's behalf. In response, Twitter put its verification process on hold. The company tweeted, "Verification was meant to authenticate identity & voice but it is interpreted as an endorsement or an indicator of importance. We recognize that we have created this confusion and need to resolve it. We have paused all general verifications while we work and will report back soon."

As of November 2017, Twitter continued to deny verification of Julian Assange's account following his requests.

In November 2019, Dalit activists of India alleged that higher-caste people get Twitter verification easily and trended hashtags #CancelAllBlueTicksInIndia and #CasteistTwitter. Critics have said that the company's verification process is not transparent and causes digital marginalisation of already marginalised communities. Twitter India rejected the allegations, calling them "impartial" and working on a "case-by-case" policy.

== Since November 2022 ==
On April 20, 2023, Twitter (known as X since July 2023) began removing verification status for users of public interest, causing a controversy among Twitter users. The website's system was altered, allowing any individual to receive verification for a monthly fee, an act which saw significant criticism.

Following the acquisition of Twitter by Elon Musk on October 28, 2022, Musk told Twitter employees to introduce paid verification by November 7 through Twitter Blue. The Verge reported that the updated Blue subscription would cost $19.99 per month, and users would lose their verification status if they did not join within 90 days. Following backlash, Musk tweeted, in response to author Stephen King, a lowered $8 price on November 1, 2022. Twitter confirmed the new price of $7.99 per month on November 5, 2022. The new verification system began rollout on November 9, 2022, a day after the 2022 United States elections. The decision to delay its rollout was to address concerns about users potentially spreading misinformation about voting results by posing as news outlets and lawmakers.

At the same time, Twitter introduced a secondary gray "Official" label on some high-profile accounts, but removed them hours after launch. Less than 48 hours later, Twitter reinstated the gray "Official" label, after multiple users were suspended for deliberately impersonating reporters and high-profile athletes like LeBron James. A viral tweet from an account purporting to be the pharmaceutical company Eli Lilly and Company caused the company's stock to fall after announcing "insulin is free now". As a result, Twitter disabled new Blue subscriptions on November 11, 2022.

=== Announcement ===
In October 2022, Casey Newton of Platformer reported that executives at Twitter began discussing the possibility of users being forced to pay for Twitter Blue in order to keep their verification status. Musk publicly announced that verification was "being revamped right now" after Newton's article; according to The Verge, Twitter planned to increase the price of Twitter Blue from US$4.99 per month to US$19.99 per month. Users would have had 90 days to subscribe or face losing their verification status, and employees were told to implement paid verification by November 9 or risk getting fired. Upon the news that Twitter Blue would cost US$19.99 per month, author Stephen King expressed displeasure towards Twitter and stated that he would leave. Musk, replying to King's tweet, proposed that the service should cost US$7.99 instead. In a separate tweet, Musk wrote that Twitter Blue subscribers would receive priority in replies, mentions, and search, fewer advertisements, and longer audio and video.

Although paid verification was expected to be launched by November 7, the reintroduction of Twitter Blue was delayed until after the 2022 United States elections on November 9, according to a memo obtained by The New York Times. The announcement of paid verification resulted in several accounts facetiously impersonating Musk, such as those of comedians Kathy Griffin and Sarah Silverman, being suspended. In response, Musk announced that impersonators using Twitter Blue "will be permanently suspended". An "official" label was announced on November 8 for notable accounts. Hours after the label began rolling out, Musk tweeted that he "killed" the label.

Accounts that had been verified through the previous system were renamed to "legacy verified", with Musk calling the previous system "corrupt and nonsensical" in a tweet, and stating the blue checkmarks on those accounts would be removed "in a few months". Musk claimed that the impersonation issue was resolved by manually reviewing all applications, but The Washington Post tech columnist Geoffrey A. Fowler was able to create an impersonation account of senator Ed Markey, (Note: This was done with the senator's consent.) which was promptly verified after subscribing to Twitter Blue and only suspended after Fowler's story was published.

On December 12, 2022, Twitter Blue was relaunched again with some changes, including an increased price of $11 for users who sign up through iOS devices to compensate for the 30% cut imposed by Apple. Twitter stated that only Twitter accounts older than 90 days and with a confirmed phone number are able to subscribe and Blue checkmarks are issued once Twitter reviews the account, and any changes to the profile "will result in the loss of the blue checkmark" until Twitter can review the account again. The "Official" labels were replaced with Verified Organizations, which are displayed with a gold checkmark and square-shaped avatars (as opposed to circular avatars for all other accounts): this program costs $1,000 per month, with Verified Organizations able to add verification to affiliated accounts for an additional fee of $50 per month for each account. Gray checkmarks were also added for government accounts on Twitter.

=== Impersonation attempts ===
Despite a seven-page document written by Twitter's content moderation team, on November 9, Twitter Blue launched with verification exclusively on iOS. Upon introducing paid verification, various individuals in sports Twitter were impersonated, such as sports writer Adam Schefter and basketball player LeBron James, with tweets announcing the supposed ousting of Las Vegas Raiders head coach Josh McDaniels or James' trade from the Los Angeles Lakers, respectively. As impersonation accounts began appearing for Nintendo and Tesla—the latter being owned by Musk—the official label returned. Other individuals and companies impersonated include former president Donald Trump, video game company Valve, and former New York City mayor Rudy Giuliani. One account impersonating the beverage corporation PepsiCo praised the superiority of Coca-Cola. Twitter paused signups for Twitter Blue on November 11; according to a Slack message obtained by Platformer reporter Zoë Schiffer, the company paused subscriptions to deal with impersonation attempts. Musk believed that impersonation would be resolved if Apple handed over the credit card information of Twitter Blue subscribers; then head of trust and safety Yoel Roth explained that Apple would not oblige to such a request.

The Washington Post published a report on November 11 detailing how reporter Geoffrey Fowler was, with permission from United States senator Ed Markey, impersonating a U.S. senator, noting that a bug in Twitter's iOS app made the checkmarks for Markey's official account and the impersonation account virtually indistinguishable. Markey, who has publicly refuted the safety of Tesla's self-driving technology, publicly debated with Musk and stated that Congress would take action against Twitter if Musk did not.

On April 24, 2023, a parody account of the defunct Disney Junior channel in the United Kingdom was verified with a gold checkmark. The account, which tweeted profanities and claimed that South Park and Family Guy would be coming to Disney Junior, became viral and was later suspended.

==== Eli Lilly and Company tweet ====
Avatar of Eli Lilly and Company

Eli Lilly and Company
(@EliLillyandCo)
tweeted:

We are excited to announce insulin is free now.

November 10, 2022

In August 2022, the Inflation Reduction Act passed, requiring companies to cap the price of insulin at US$35 per month for Medicare. On November 10, a Twitter account impersonating the pharmaceutical company Eli Lilly and Company—one of the three largest manufacturers of insulin—posted a tweet stating that insulin would be made free. According to The Washington Post, Twitter failed to respond to the company for several hours. The incident resulted in Eli Lilly pulling advertisements from Twitter. United States senator Bernie Sanders used the tweet to highlight the price of insulin as other users began creating satirical accounts jovially apologizing for making insulin free, with one such account writing, "Humalog is now $400. We can do this whenever we want and there's nothing you can do about it".

The identity of the user who posted the tweet remained unknown until November 22, when Sean Morrow, a 34-year-old writer for the media organization More Perfect Union, admitted to operating the account and writing the tweet. In a video, Morrow stated that he used the account of the Mothman running for the United States Senate for West Virginia, and put that the account was a parody in its biography. Morrow took the video to detail the history of insulin manufacturing and the monopolization of the insulin industry. Eli Lilly further lowered the price of insulin in March 2023.

=== Reintroduction of verification ===
On November 25, Musk announced that verification would be split into separate checkmarks for companies (in gold), government institutions (in gray), with all other entities retaining their blue checkmarks, as early as December 2. A separate tweet also stated that individuals could have a secondary logo for any organizations they may be a part of. Continuing from Musk's idea of company employees receiving an icon for their employers, Twitter announced Blue for Business on December 19. In spite of an official release, venture capital firm Craft Ventures appeared to already have the icons.

The rollout of government labels resulted in the accounts of Norwegian prime minister Jonas Gahr Stoere and minister of foreign affairs Anniken Huitfeldt being labeled as affiliated with Nigeria. On January 5, Fowler was once again able to impersonate Markey, with Barreto Fetterman, senator John Fetterman's wife, thanking the impersonator rather than Markey himself. The report defied Musk's claim that Twitter Blue subscribers would be manually verified and shows how impersonators still persist on the platform despite phone number verification and wait times.

== State-affiliated media label controversy ==
On April 5, 2023, the Twitter account for National Public Radio (NPR) received a label that it was "state-affiliated", despite the fact it receives less than 1% of its funding from the government; Voice of America (VOA), a state-affiliated media arm of the United States, did not receive a label. NPR CEO John Lansing condemned Twitter for the labeling. A similar label was added to Public Broadcasting Station's (PBS) Twitter account on April 8. According to PBS, the broadcaster has no intention to use its Twitter account after receiving the label. NPR announced it had quit Twitter on April 12 after the label was changed to "government-affiliated". The decision was a reversal of the company's previous treatment towards NPR, which it cited as an example of a public news organization that is not state-affiliated. The British Broadcasting Corporation (BBC) also received a government-affiliated label, but appealed to Musk. The Canadian Broadcasting Corporation (CBC) received a label stating it was "69% government-funded", in apparent reference to the sex position, after Conservative Party of Canada leader Pierre Poilievre told Musk to apply the label. The CBC is 66% government-funded, and stopped tweeting after the incident.

On April 22, Twitter dropped the state-affiliated and government-affiliated labels entirely, including for Russia's RT and China's Xinhua News and China Global Television Network (CGTN). According to Musk, the idea to drop the labels came from author Walter Isaacson. The removal of the state-affiliated label followed a change in Twitter's algorithm, in which restrictions on accounts belonging to Russian state media were lifted. RT editor-in-chief Margarita Simonyan congratulated Musk on lifting the restrictions on her account.

== Verification status removals ==
On March 23, 2023, Twitter announced that on April 1, 2023, it would begin winding down its legacy verification program and removing legacy verified checkmarks. The New York Times reported that exceptions would be made for Twitter's top 500 advertisers and its 10,000 most-followed organizations that had been previously verified. BuzzFeed News reported that multiple news organizations like The New York Times, The Washington Post and The Los Angeles Times had no plans to pay for Twitter's "Verified Organizations" service nor would they reimburse reporters for having Twitter Blue. Similarly, Axios reported that White House digital strategy director Rob Flaherty sent an internal email to staffers saying "[t]here are ongoing trials for the program that we are monitoring, but we will not enroll in it."

Twitter did not immediately begin removing checkmarks on April 1, 2023. The Washington Post reported that "[the removal] of verification badges is a largely manual process powered by a system prone to breaking" and "[i]n the past, there was no way to reliably remove badges at a bulk scale", according to former Twitter employees. Twitter also updated the language previously used to distinguish between legacy and Twitter Blue-verified users, merging them into a single description, and later unfollowed all legacy-verified accounts. On April 11, 2023, Musk announced the final date for removing legacy blue checkmarks to be April 20.

On April 25, 2023, Musk announced that posts by verified accounts would now be prioritized ahead of unverified users, but behind those of the user's own follows, in replies to tweets. On April 30, 2023, multiple legacy verified users began noticing a bug that temporarily restored the legacy blue checkmark by changing their bio.

On October 17, 2023, X announced that it would trial a scheme requiring new users who register via the website in New Zealand and the Philippines to pay US$1 per-year in order to use the platform. If the user does not subscribe, they will only receive read-only access to the platform. It was stated that this system was required to "bolster our already significant efforts to reduce spam, manipulation of our platform and bot activity."

=== The New York Times ===
On April 2, 2023, the main account for The New York Times became one of the first major media companies to lose its verified status on Twitter. Ahead of the official release of Verification for Organizations, newspaper The New York Times stated that it would not pay for a verification checkmark. In response to a Twitter user who pointed out the newspaper's decision, Musk stated, "Oh ok, we'll take it off then". Musk then called The New York Times hypocritical for charging readers to read its articles. He criticised the newspaper for tweeting hundreds of posts every day, including drafts that were not accepted into the published editions of the paper, and inundating the daily feed of users who followed it. Despite the deadline for Twitter Blue passing, and aside from The New York Times, many legacy verified accounts continued to retain their verified status. According to The New York Times themselves, the top 10,000 Twitter accounts and top 500 advertisers would be exempt from paying.

=== Legacy verified accounts ===
Avatar of Stephen King

Stephen King
(@StephenKing)
tweeted:

My Twitter account says I've subscribed to Twitter Blue. I haven't.
My Twitter account says I've given a phone number. I haven't.

April 20, 2023

On March 23, Twitter announced it would remove blue checkmarks from "legacy" verified accounts on April 1, or April Fools' Day. Twitter subsequently stopped distinguishing Twitter Blue subscribers from legacy verified accounts on April 2. On April 19, the Twitter Verified account tweeted that, on April 20, legacy verified checkmarks would disappear, in apparent reference to the cannabis slang number 420; Musk had previously tweeted about the April 20 date on April 11. Despite skepticism due to the date, Twitter began removing legacy checkmarks on April 20, 2023. Among those that lost their verified status included Cristiano Ronaldo and Beyoncé. Actress Halle Berry posted a meme commemorating the loss of her blue checkmark. Several figures, such as Stephen King, noted that they had not paid for verification and—in King's case—had not added a phone number to their account. While some users, such as Eliot Higgins of Bellingcat appear to have been given verification for free, others, such as actor Ryan Reynolds—whose Twitter account has 21 million followers—do not. NBC News noted that legacy verified accounts still appeared in search results filtering for just verified users.

The Washington Post noted that several deceased individuals, such as basketball player Kobe Bryant, actor Chadwick Boseman, celebrity chef Anthony Bourdain, and Linkin Park vocalist Chester Bennington had a blue checkmark. Other figures with blue checkmarks include singer Michael Jackson, rapper Mac Miller, and senator John McCain. Many users noticed that Saudi journalist Jamal Khashoggi had a blue checkmark, despite being assassinated in 2018 by the government of Saudi Arabia. Khashoggi's checkmark resulted in an outcry from users of the site. The blue checkmark does not state whether or not it has been gifted or bought.

Following the removal of legacy verification, Twitter began verifying the accounts of several celebrities who had been critical of, and did not purchase Twitter Blue, including Stephen King, LeBron James, Hasan Piker, and dril. Musk implied that he was paying for their subscriptions personally. Pope Francis' blue checkmark was removed before being replaced by a gray checkmark; as the head of the Catholic Church, the Pope is the sovereign of Vatican City. A day later, Twitter updated its policy for Twitter Ads requiring all advertisers to be subscribed to Verified Organizations, but businesses spending at least $1000 a month in advertising would automatically receive membership in the Verified Organizations program at no additional cost. On April 22, 2023, Twitter seemingly began issuing blue and gold checkmarks to accounts with at least a million followers, including those belonging to deceased users such as Anthony Bourdain, Chadwick Boseman, and Kobe Bryant. Since the blue checkmark now indicates an active Twitter Blue subscription, several high‑profile users began looking for ways to remove it, usually by briefly changing their display name.

The far-right political party Britain First received a gold checkmark, signifying that it was a business, while its leader, Paul Golding, has a blue checkmark. According to researcher Nima Owji, Twitter will allow users who have received Twitter Blue for free to cancel their subscription.

==== Further impersonation attempts ====
Coinciding with the 2023 Sudan conflict, an account posing as the Rapid Support Forces (RSF) claimed that its leader, Mohamed Hamdan Dagalo, died in the conflict, as the legitimate RSF Twitter account was unverified. Other tweets made by impersonators include an account posing as politician Hillary Clinton declaring a supposed presidential bid in 2024, author J.K. Rowling apologizing for comments she made against transgender people, Pope Francis stating there are "at least three genders", Florida governor Ron DeSandis [sic] calling political donor Kent Sturmon a pedophile, singer Olivia Rodrigo taking credit for a fan-fiction post on Wattpad, and skater Tony Hawk talking about building a skate park in Des Moines, Iowa. Security researcher John Scott-Railton noted a potential rise in impersonation accounts of government agencies, such as Federal Bureau of Investigation (FBI) branches and the United States Citizenship and Immigration Services, as their Twitter accounts are unverified. One tweet, supposedly from cuisine publication The New York Times Cooking, attracted attention for sharing a meme recipe of a hand-shaped M&M cookie atop Greek salad, dubbed "King's Hand". Comedian Kelly Carlin claimed her deceased father—comedian George Carlin, for whom she runs an account—was being impersonated. In a separate instance of impersonation, a parody account for Disney Junior in the United Kingdom was verified as a business. The account, which repeatedly used racial slurs and claimed that the adult animated series South Park and Family Guy would appear on Disney Junior, was suspended after Disney found the account.

The removal of blue checkmarks has had a political impact. Taking advantage of the removal of the blue checkmarks for the Twitter accounts for Chicago mayor Lori Lightfoot, the Chicago Department of Transportation, and the Illinois Department of Transportation, false accounts began appearing claiming that the major expressway Lake Shore Drive would close next month for private traffic. Similarly, an impostor account appeared after the New York City Government account tweeted that it was official. New York representative Alexandria Ocasio-Cortez warned of potential harm in misinformation after the encounter. At least eleven accounts claiming to be the Los Angeles Police Department appeared in the wake of the removal of blue checkmarks. An account claiming to be New York City mayor Eric Adams promised to create a Department of Traffic and Parking Enforcement while slashing funding for the New York City Police Department; the operator of the account was later discovered to be Josh Boerman, co-host of the podcast The Worst of All Possible Worlds, who claimed to have made the account in jest. Election offices for four of the most populous counties in the United States—Cook County, Illinois, Harris County, Texas, Maricopa County, Arizona, and San Diego County, California—were unverified. In particular, Maricopa County has been targeted by conspiracy theorists for alleged irregularities in how the county voted in the 2020 presidential election; the county's ballots were audited by Republicans in 2021, finding no such claims of voter fraud. Ahead of the 2023 Philadelphia mayoral election and the Pennsylvania primary election, the account for the Philadelphia City Commissioners was unverified, leading to several verified accounts impersonating the commissioners.

On May 22, an account aligned with the QAnon conspiracy theory posted an image generated by artificial intelligence that seemingly depicted an explosion near the Pentagon. The fake image was amplified by the Russian propaganda television network RT and the far-right blog Zero Hedge. A verified account posing as Bloomberg News then posted the claim accompanied by several other verified accounts. The S&P 500 fell sharply as a result of the news before rebounding. Several Indian news outlets, including Zee News and Republic TV, aired false reports about the supposed explosion.

=== Censorship ===
Twitter Blue Checkmarks have been removed or suspended from verified accounts as a form of censorship. Laura Loomer, a political activist, conspiracy theorist and Internet personality, was opposed to H-1B visas and then lost her blue checkmark on 27 December 2024. Gavin Mario Wax, ConservativePAC, and Owen Shroyer also affected.

== Significance and social impact ==
Prior to the introduction of paid Twitter verification after the acquisition of Twitter by Elon Musk, verified status was a highly sought-after qualification among Twitter users. Since Twitter alone granted blue checkmarks, they could use them as a passive inducement for users to create more content. Alison Hearn argued in 2017 that they introduce a new social class of Twitter users. This can cause tension between verified and non-verified users of the site; when Twitter temporarily locked out verified accounts in the aftermath of the 2020 Twitter account hijacking, many non-verified users celebrated.

After the blue checkmark was made available as a paid subscription in 2022, reporters noted trolls spreading conspiracy theories about COVID-19 vaccines using the checkmark to feign credibility.

Several fake accounts surfaced following Twitter's move to eliminate the blue tick verification on April 20, 2023. An account pretending to be Hillary Clinton "announced" her intention to run for the presidency again. The said fake account used an identical profile photo as that of the former U.S. senator's legitimate handle. Moreover, a new Twitter handle in New York City claimed to be a legitimate account representing the government. The BBC has noted that the increase in sponsored verification would heighten the spread of false information on the platform.

=== Individual reactions ===
The removal of the blue checkmark and Twitter Blue have sparked controversy. Actress Alyssa Milano added to her Twitter profile that she would not be paying for Twitter Blue. The Twitter account for Elmo tweeted that, "Elmo will miss you, little blue check mark". The blue checkmark has also caused crosscurrents between Twitter users, with technology journalist Joanna Stern writing that she "likes editing tweets", and appears to have distanced herself from the blue checkmark. Morning Consult journalist Bobby Blanchard asked Twitter to remove his blue checkmark. Other personalities and entities appeared confused as to why their blue checkmarks appeared despite not subscribing to Twitter Blue, such as journalist Maggie Haberman, actors Ben Schwartz and Elijah Wood, astrophysicist Neil deGrasse Tyson, and the Massachusetts Institute of Technology. The Twitter account for the Auschwitz-Birkenau State Museum clarified that it had not paid for Twitter Blue either. Model Chrissy Teigen compared her blue checkmark to the film It Follows (2014) and was able to get hers removed by changing her username, telling speechwriter Jon Favreau. Favreau later stated that he believed Musk was "capricious" in his actions and did not want to be potentially suspended for unverifying his account. Likewise, stand-up comedian and actor Patton Oswalt changed his username to remove his blue checkmark. dril, part of Twitter's secretive list of users to promote and of "Weird Twitter", removed his blue checkmark by changing his display name to "slave to Woke". Replying to economist Paul Krugman, who wrote that he did not pay for Twitter Blue, Musk replied with an image of a child crying while eating spaghetti. Doja Cat said that having a blue checkmark "means theres [sic] a higher chance that you're a complete loser".

At the premiere of The Super Mario Bros. Movie (2023), actor Jack Black stated that, "It's definitely not cool to pay for it". Similarly, singer Jacob Sartorius, who appreciated receiving a blue checkmark in 2016, said, "It's not something that’s cool anymore". Black's co-star Chris Pratt showed apathy towards the blue checkmark. Similarly, rapper Ice Spice and vocalist Ice-T showed no interest towards the blue checkmark. To the contrary, actor Jason Alexander said that he would leave if his verification was removed. Minnesota Twins play-by-play announcer Dick Bremer left Twitter after losing his verification; Bremer was drawn into Twitter after a parody account used his name and likeness to post racist tweets. Actor Bella Ramsey left the platform after the removal of blue checkmarks. Singer Dionne Warwick, actor Ian McKellen, and rapper Lil Nas X outright stated that they refuse to pay for the blue checkmark, as actors Mark Hamill and Ben Stiller, activist Monica Lewinsky, singer-songwriter Jason Isbell, and journalist Kara Swisher suggested they would. Stand-up comedian Mike Drucker congratulated Twitter for implementing paid verification, writing, "Some users on Twitter were starting to confuse me for the type of person who'd pay $8 a month to feel special. It was embarrassing". Representative Alexandria Ocasio-Cortez appeared on Bluesky a week after legacy blue checkmarks were removed.

After beseeching Musk, actor Charlie Sheen regained his checkmark. Musician Sean Ono Lennon showed confusion towards celebrities who refused to pay for Twitter Blue. Ardent supporters of Musk have defended Twitter Blue, particularly noting its price point. Internet entrepreneur Jason Calacanis, entrepreneur David O. Sacks, and essayist Nassim Nicholas Taleb placed immense value into the subscription while tweeting about it, with Taleb calling those who pay for other products and services monthly but not Twitter Blue "domain dependent misers!" Right-wing Twitter user Catturd called critics of Twitter Blue "elitist snobs".

=== #BlockTheBlue movement ===
The removal of blue checkmarks from legacy verified accounts inspired the hashtag #BlockTheBlue, in which users block any users they see with a blue checkmark, with Eve 6 bassist Max Collins taking part in the hashtag. A Twitter account for the hashtag was created before being abruptly taken down. dril, who originated the #BlockTheBlue campaign, spoke to Mashable's Matt Binder, writing, "blocking [Twitter Blue subscribers] and encouraging others to do the same on a massive scale is the complete opposite of what they want". Conversely, Epic Games CEO Tim Sweeney wrote, "People in this #BlockTheBlue pressure campaign are losers and goons", with Musk replying, "Exactly". Sweeney has been an outspoken critic of verification since 2018.

=== Organizations ===
In response to Verification for Organizations, various news organizations—including The New York Times, Los Angeles Times, The Washington Post, BuzzFeed News, HuffPost, Politico, and Vox Media sites—stated that they would not pay for Twitter verification for their employees. CNN said that it would not pay for employee verification status except for some staff members. The White House has no intentions to pay for checkmarks for their employees, according to Axios.

The Twitter account for Amazon Prime Video in the United Kingdom posted a meme of The Boys character Homelander pushing his son off a roof, with Homelander labeled as Twitter and his son labeled as a blue checkmark. Law blog SCOTUSblog stopped posting on Twitter entirely after it lost its checkmark.

=== Analysis ===
Northeastern University School of Law professor Alexandra Roberts argued that Twitter's claim that certain individuals paid for Twitter Blue may violate state and federal false representation laws, such as the Lanham Act, popularized through a retweet by dril, but reserved that Twitter was not making a direct advertisement. Solicitor Simon McGarr mentioned that Twitter's insistence on the blue checkmark for some users, such as dril, may violate the General Data Protection Regulation (GDPR) in the European Union, as verifying accounts requires a phone number. McGarr also noted Tolley v. Fry, a 1931 court case filed against chocolate bar manufacturer J. S. Fry & Sons by golfer Cyril Tolley alleging that the advertising of chocolate bars with a caricature of Tolley was defamatory, or the similar case Eddie Irvine v. Talksport between racing driver Eddie Irvine and sports radio station Talksport. Other scholars have cited the Federal Trade Commission Act of 1914, while some have pointed to the disdain for blue checkmarks and the potential effects of the checkmark on celebrities' reputations. The Federal Trade Commission (FTC) has not commented on Twitter Blue, although an anonymous former FTC official called it "deceptive".

Following the initial implementation of paid verification, the Twitter account for the anti-vaccine propaganda film Died Suddenly (2022) became verified. The account has been used to spread medical misinformation, including of COVID-19 vaccines. The removal of blue checkmarks has also been seen as "chaos for emergency services", according to Marc-André Argentino, a research fellow at the International Center for the Study of Radicalization. Paleoecologist Jacquelyn Gill and Berkeley Earth scientist Robert Rohde were also unverified, presenting a changing landscape for climate scientists on Twitter. Pro-Russian Twitter accounts used verification to sow doubt over the true nature of the 2023 Ohio train derailment in East Palestine, Ohio.
