= Da share z0ne =

Satirical social media user

- Da share z0ne's Twitter profile photo
- Other names: da share z0ne (or "zone") (Note: capitalized ("Da Share Z0ne"), as is conventional for proper nouns. However, Slate writer Jacob Brogan said that he rendered the account's name this way only to conform with the publication's style guide, and that da share z0ne itself seems to "favor[] an all-lowercase spelling."); Da motha fucken share z0ne; Admin (character who operates the account)
- Years active: 2015–present
- Known for: Ironic humor and skeleton art image macros
- Website: @dasharez0ne on Bluesky

@dasharez0ne (also known as da share z0ne, Da motha fuckin share z0ne, da z0ne, DSZ, and other variations) is a social media account known for posting image macros pairing skeleton art and absurdist or ironic captions. Da share z0ne's posts are an elaborate parody of online hyper-masculinity; specifically, da share z0ne's posts mimic "tough guy" memes with characteristics like macho posturing, poor graphic design, and juvenile fondness for generic "cool" imagery like skeletons, leather jackets, grim reapers, tombstones, flames, and guns.

The creator or creators of da share z0ne operate anonymously. The account is supposedly operated by a fictitious skeleton character known as Admin. All the posts, as well as responses to press inquiries, are made in-character as Admin. In ironic contrast to the over-the-top macho aesthetic of the imagery, the Admin character himself is neurotic, emotionally sensitive, "woke", and preoccupied with mundane aspects of everyday life. The juxtaposition provides much of the satirical effect.

Journalists have praised da share z0ne for its distinct, off-kilter brand of humor and the rich characterization of Admin. In 2018, da share z0ne launched an original trading card game called The Devil's Level with the help of artistic collaborators, including fellow Twitter user dril, Drew Fairweather, and numerous comics artists.

== Social media posts ==
Da share z0ne began posting in September 2015. The account is best-known for image macros that combine artwork of skeletons, compiled from various Internet sources, with superimposed captions in assorted typefaces. The account is loosely affiliated with the "Weird Twitter" subculture. The account is an extended parody of a particular style of overtly masculine meme page on social media. In the words of The A.V. Club's Gabe Worgaftik, the target of its parody is "the kind of Facebook page that posts tough-guy memes over pictures of skeletons that your fuck-up cousin shares ... this generation's version of a 'Keep honking, I'm reloading' bumper sticker." Writing for Dazed, Luke O'Neil called da share z0ne a "riff on the style of toxic masculinity that can be found on specific corners of the meme-based internet ... where dudes are dudes, motorcycles and guns kick ass, and everything you need to know about a guy can be crammed onto a horribly designed image macro of clashing fonts, unreadable texts, and shoddy looking graphics."

In November 2018, The Columbus Dispatch reported that webcomic artist Drew Fairweather runs da share z0ne.

In February 2020, Admin posted several tweets endorsing Bernie Sanders for the Democratic primary in 2020.

=== Visual aesthetic ===
An image macro created by da share z0ne. The caption reads: "Awww... You need a 'safe space'??? How about I pledge to do my very best to provide one!!!"

Da share z0ne posts are characterized by purposefully poor graphic design, using multiple tacky fonts in a single image and a different watermark in almost every image. The visual style of da share z0ne was described by Slate's Jacob Brogan as a "borderline comical gothic aesthetic" with a "mock-fascination with fatalist cool," but with "silly" captions that "operate in winkingly awkward contradistinction to the pictures." Motherboard's Rachel Pick called the account's aesthetic a "mash-up of what guys who own Harleys and stoned 14-year-olds think looks cool." According to Zack Boehm of Uloop, a typical da share z0ne meme is a "configuration of the following: The gaunt visage of a demonic skeleton (this is a DSZ staple), fire, guns, motorcycles, leather jackets, Viking garb, laptops, and short missives like 'Why do bad people get to have good pets?' or 'Thinkin about getting really into Japan' spelled out in Windows '95 word art."

Archer Angel at The Daily Dot compared da share z0ne's format to the approach pioneered by Gangster Popeye, a satirical page likewise "inspired by the 'tough guy' memes from pages like KrazyTrain and Check Dis Shit Out—macros that feature text on themes such as being a badass and not taking shit from anyone, superimposed on pictures of skeletons (often holding weapons)." Roisin Kiberd of Motherboard connected da share z0ne within a history of repurposing skeleton art in Internet culture—"memetic memento mori"—dating back to the 1990s.

=== "Admin" character ===
Da share z0ne is run by an anonymous person or group of people. The fictional character who purportedly runs da share z0ne is a skeleton (Note: When asked "[a]re you a skeleton, or do you just identify with the image of skeletons?" in Newsweek, Admin replied "EVERYONE IS A SKELETON THINK ABOUT IT" [sic]. Similarly, Admin told New York "EVERYONE IS A SKELETON (THINK ABOUT IT) AND IM A SKELETON. SO ITS A PIC OF ME (ADMIN)" [sic]. Da share z0ne collaborator Oliver Leach told Vice "[h]e really is a skeleton," but when pressed by the interviewer, Leach could not explain the mechanics of how Admin smokes a bong.) named Admin. The creator or creators of da share z0ne respond in-character as Admin to press inquiries, (Note: On the other hand, da share z0ne has also been known to ignore press inquiries or to respond to journalists in odd ways, an expression of the account's hostility to "bloggers attempting to turn jokes into content." When The Daily Dot reached out to da share z0ne, they received no reply, but noted several tweets from the account mocking attempts by the press to profile the account. Slate received no reply to an interview request for 12 hours, despite a read receipt indicating that the account had seen Slate's message almost immediately after it had been sent, before da share z0ne ultimately "sent a photograph of what appeared to be a hairy, naked butt.") and Admin has given interviews with Herb.co, Dazed, Vice Media's Motherboard, Newsweek, and New York magazine. In his posts and other messages, Admin usually types in all caps with numerous misspellings.

Admin has been described as an everyman (or "every-skeleton") character whose "relatable" struggles mirror everyday struggles and the impact of Internet culture on his generation. Admin hates his job, enjoys marijuana, and has lowbrow taste. In da share z0ne posts, Admin has complained of irritable bowel syndrome, experiences of social anxiety, and depression. Admin frequently breaks the fourth wall in posts; for example, they describe running da share z0ne itself, boast about their inflated sense of the account's popularity, reference their own computer problems, and accidentally type out and submit web searches as tweets. Miles Klee wrote that the Admin's defining trait is their "nerdy white-collar warriorhood."

An important aspect of Admin's persona is their social consciousness; Kiberd described Admin as an "unlikely—but lovable—social justice hero." The character's usage and love of hyper-masculine imagery ironically contrasts with their actual personality, which is neurotic, unintelligent, awkward, and lonely, yet also deeply sensitive, essentially decent, and even socially conscious. Diverging from the latent racism, misogyny, homophobia and transphobia commonly found on the pages that da share z0ne parodies, Admin "explicitly performs 'wokeness'" with consciousness-raising, albeit "deeply campy," slogans in its posts on topics such as gender, immigration, refugees, consent, and safe spaces. Admin's socially conscious posts are, according to Emily Gaudette at Newsweek, "like reading the private thoughts of a liberal goth kid whose taste in art hasn't yet caught up to their advanced understanding of mental health and politics."

The detailed characterization of Admin—particularly the stark contrast between their character and the "cool" imagery—supplies much of da share z0ne's ironic humor and satirical content. Boehm notes that the "jarring dissonance" between Admin's "vulnerable, pitiable" text and the "gothic, biker-horror imagery" is crucial to the page's satirical effect, applying the creators' knowledge of "the kind of strange macho, anonymously aggressive internet culture that [da share z0ne is] trying to spoof" to "deftly needle at the hypocritical constructs of masculinity with a gnarled, bony skeleton finger." O'Neil writes that the contrast reveals the subtext of loneliness behind the online "tough guy" archetype that Admin caricatures. Jay Hathaway at The Daily Dot wrote that a "character-driven Twitter account hasn't blended macho attitude and complete personal dysfunction this perfectly" since Karl Welzein (@dadboner), a Twitter character written by comedian Mike Burns who is "a divorced, middle-aged Detroit dude who loves to rock hard and scope babes, but mainly hangs around the parking lot at Applebee's."

=== Popularity and reception ===
Vice Media reported that da share z0ne had accumulated almost 88,000 followers on Twitter by January 2018. The account hit 100,000 followers in June 2018. According to Hathaway, da share z0ne has a "universal appeal" that "crosses cliquish social boundaries," as its memes are "retweeted by everyone from Weird Twitter chuckleboys to cool, queer, indie gamers to dry and boring media-marketing types." Jacob Brogan of Slate quoted and agreed with Hathaway's assessment of the account's "universal appeal," praising the persona of the account for "gently making light of the way we all present ourselves on social media—of the way we attempt to show off the best, brightest versions of our lives, only to accidentally reveal just how lame we really are." Luke O'Neil at Dazed praised the sharpness of da share z0ne's satire, as well as its surprising emotional depth and warmth:

The surface level appeal of the account ... will be obvious to anyone fluent in the world of absurdist, shit-posting meme pages on Facebook and Reddit and the like. But as the juxtaposition of traditionally hyper-masculine signifiers and Admin's foibles at the heart of each post points up, there's a significant departure from the norm here: Da Share Z0ne has heart. Unlike so much other internet humour, there's nothing malicious about it, unless you count yourself among the type of brutish bore it's parodying in the first place.

Will Menaker, a cohost on the political comedy podcast Chapo Trap House, made a tongue-in-cheek call for da share z0ne to receive the MacArthur "Genius Grant" in June 2016. Mic named a post from da share z0ne as one of 101 "canonical" tweets. In October 2017, Jerry Saltz, senior art critic for New York magazine, replied to a post by da share z0ne to call the account "Very late Francis Bacon?" In December 2017, Alex Greenberger of ARTnews included da share z0ne in a round-up of the year's best art on screens—including onscreen art installations at galleries and museums, cinema, television, and art "on my laptop"—saying "[i]t's art if I say it is—and da share z0ne is art." Da share z0ne was nominated in the "weird" category for the 10th Shorty Awards, an annual awards show by Sawhorse Media that recognizes exceptional short-form content on the social web, but it did not place as a finalist.

Da Share Z0ne was named one of "The 100 best, worst, and weirdest things we saw on the internet in the 2010s" in 2019 by the AV Club.

== The Devil's Level card game ==
The Devil's Level
- A selection of cards from The Devil's Level
- Designer: Admin (creator or creators of da share z0ne) and credited guest artists
- Publisher: Self-published
- Players: 2–8 players
- Age range: 18+
- Chance: Some (order of cards drawn, various card abilities)

The Devil's Level is a trading card game based on da share z0ne. Funded via Kickstarter, The Devil's Level reached its initial fundraising goal of $28,000 within hours of its launch on January 22, 2018. By the campaign's conclusion a month later, the game had reached $227,250 in funding. It is expected to ship in September 2018.

The Devil's Level features a core deck of 144 cards, plus three 36-card expansion packs, with cards encased in a foil-embossed skull box designed by Oliver Leach. The game's rules have been compared to Magic: The Gathering and Cards Against Humanity.

=== Guest artists ===
Admin claimed responsibility for "most" of the card artwork and credited the following guest artists (listed with their Twitter handles, as they are on the Kickstarter page) for making contributions:

- Natalie Dee (@nataliedee) — known as a co-creator of the webcomic Married to the Sea
- Drew Toothpaste (@drewtoothpaste) — known for the webcomic Toothpaste for Dinner and as a co-creator of Married to the Sea)
- dril (Note: When asked about his contributions to The Devil's Level, dril disavowed his involvement, telling Vice [sic]: "ididn't do any of the designs. i dont believe in art. i wore a nice butlers outfit and brought fresh towels to admin and his friends. i looked very handsome." Further, dril claimed he had not even played The Devil's Level, explaining "only other geniuses are permitted to play iot," but also claimed that Amazon founder and CEO Jeff Bezos had played and endorsed the game.)
- KC Green (@kcgreenn) — known for the webcomic Gunshow
- Oliver Leach (@bakkooonn)
- Will Laren (@larenwill)
- Greg Pollock (@weedguy420boner)

== See also ==
- Twitterature
- Skeleton (undead)
- Death (personification)
