= Dril =

Pseudonymous Twitter and Bluesky user

dril
- A self-portrait from dril's 2018 book, based on his Twitter avatar, a blurred image of actor Jack Nicholson's face
- Other names: wint (intermittent Twitter display name), Paul Dochney (creator)
- Years active: 2008–present
- Known for: Absurdist tweets
- Notable work: Dril Official "Mr. Ten Years" Anniversary Collection
- Website: wint.co

@dril is a pseudonymous Twitter user best known for his idiosyncratic style of absurdist humor and non-sequiturs. The account and the character associated with the tweets are all commonly referred to as dril (the account's username on Twitter) or wint (the account's intermittent display name), both rendered lowercase but often capitalized by others. Since his first tweet in 2008, dril has gained more than 1.8 million followers.

Dril is one of the most notable accounts associated with "Weird Twitter", a subculture on the site that shares a surreal, ironic sense of humor. The character associated with dril is highly distinctive, often described as a bizarre reflection of a typical male American Internet user. Other social media users have repurposed dril's tweets for humorous or satiric effect in a variety of political and cultural contexts. Many of dril's tweets, phrases, and tropes have become familiar parts of Internet slang.

The few available details about his life fueled speculation about his identity, though a large contingent of his fanbase insisted that others respect his choice to maintain his privacy. In 2017, following a doxing incident, a piece from New York suggested the author's identity. Dril was identified as Paul Dochney (born 1987). Dochney typically responded to press inquiries "in character". Dochney confirmed his identity on several occasions thereafter, and in 2023 he participated in his first interview under his own name at The Ringer.

Beyond tweeting, Dochney funds his work through Patreon, has created animated short films and contributed illustrations and writing to other artists' collaborative projects. His first book, Dril Official "Mr. Ten Years" Anniversary Collection (2018), is a compilation of the account's "greatest hits" alongside new illustrations. In 2019 he announced the launch of a streaming web series called Truthpoint: Darkweb Rising, an InfoWars parody co-created with comedian Derek Estevez-Olsen for Adult Swim. Writers have praised dril for his originality and humor; for example, poet Patricia Lockwood said of him: "he is a master of tone, he is a master of character".

== Biography ==
Dochney was born in June 1987. He grew up in New Jersey, raised by working-class parents: his father worked as a manager at FedEx while his mother, a homemaker, sought out odd jobs for additional income. After dropping out of college on his first attempt, he restarted at Wilmington University in Delaware and attained a BA in media design (i.e., graphic and web design). He moved to Philadelphia in the late 2010s. By the early 2020s, Dochney resided in Greater Los Angeles.

Avatar of wint

wint
(@dril)
tweeted:

no

September 15, 2008

Dochney was an avid Internet user from early childhood. By the 2000s, he was posting at the Something Awful forums under the name "gigantic drill". He spent most of his time posting artwork to the site's "Fuck You and Die" (FYAD) forum. According to David Thorpe, a former Something Awful admin, gigantic drill was known as "just a guy who was posting funny stuff on there", but never one of the site's featured front page writers. Dril joined Twitter about two years after its launch, adopting the handle "@dril" because the correctly spelled "@drill" had already been taken. Dril sent his first tweet, the single word "no", on September 15, 2008.

Later, when reflecting on the state of Twitter at the time of his first tweet, dril said "everyone was just posting bullshit like, 'Oh, this is what I had for lunch.' It was just, like, tech guys posting inane details about their lives. I posted 'no' because I didn't care for it at the time. I still really don't care for it." The @dril account then remained silent on Twitter for nine months before his second tweet—"how do i get cowboy paint off a dog ."—and has posted regularly in the years since.

=== Identity ===
I mean, my name is already out there. It's in my Wikipedia article. Maybe people need to grow up. Just accept that I'm not like Santa Claus. I'm not a magic elf who posts.

— Dochney, The Ringer (April 12, 2023)

Dochney initially maintained anonymity; for many years, little was known about the author behind the @dril account. When asked about the account's longtime anonymity during a private Q&A in 2017, he responded "i am an almost 30 year old man and i could not really care less about the Authenticity of the platform i use to convey dick jokes." Jacob Bakkila, one of the writers behind the @Horse_ebooks Twitter account, hinted in 2013 that the person behind dril had once hired him for a project. Bakkila told BuzzFeed that dril's author was a graphic designer living somewhere in the New York metropolitan tri-state area. BuzzFeed's John Herrman and Katie Notopoulos speculated that the account might be a collaborative project or that Bakkila himself was behind it. Bakkila denied the rumor that he was dril, adding that dril was "a friend" who had contributed to the @Horse_ebooks sequel, Bear Stearns Bravo.

On November 16, 2017, a Tumblr post identifying dril's author as Paul Dochney went viral. Other posts identifying Dochney existed as early as 2014 on Tumblr, Twitter, and Reddit, but these earlier posts had not gone viral or been publicized in the media. (Note: Dochney confirmed that his identity had been uncovered "plenty of times" before the doxing, but these posts had not attracted significant attention or publicity.) The 2017 post unmasked dril through "informed guesswork" founded on other clues, including a LinkedIn page associated with Bear Stearns Bravo and a writing credit on Hiveswap, an adventure game set in the universe of Andrew Hussie's long-running webcomic Homestuck.

The Tumblr post was described by the press as a "doxing": an unwelcome broadcasting of private personal information online. The post was met with backlash and dismay among Twitter users, many of whom voiced a preference for keeping dril's personal identity a mystery and preserving the author's privacy. According to Jozefien Wouters, writing for the Belgian news magazine Knack:

The strange thing is that the unmasking caused only a relatively small shockwave. Everyone decided to pretend that nothing had happened. "I will not let you guys ruin the last good thing on this website. Protect dril, respect dril, leave dril alone", a fan tweeted. Nobody really wants to know who is making compulsive nonsense from his keyboard on the other side of the computer screen.

Dril addressed the doxing on his Patreon page, writing "everything's normal. i guess im [sic] 'doxxed' now. sorry. it's fine. i donr [sic] really give a shit." (Note: dril (November 30, 2017). "everything's normal". Patreon. Archived from the original on December 22, 2017. (subscription required)) In a Reddit "ask us anything" interview, dril confirmed that he had worked on Hiveswap. (Note: dril (as "dril_VERIFED") (December 1, 2017). "We're Dril and KC Green, and we're the good internet boys. Ask us anything about games theories and breakfast meals. • r/IAmA". Reddit. "if its not him hes very good at lying") He said the personal impact of the doxing had been minimal, adding that people had been "surprisingly normal" and he had no "sordid past" to hide, but also described being outed as "my Cross to bear" and said "theres nothing scandalous enough there to make it worth publicizing and looking like an ass hole while doing so."

In August 2018, the Twitter account announced that dril was transferring the publishing rights of his tweets to Paul Dochney, whom he called his "Agent And Master", for the purpose of publishing his first book. Some reporters subsequently identified dril as Dochney. In a 2020 Reddit AMA, dril commented, "i doxxed myself so amazon would give me permission to publish my other book last year. im some guy named paul dochney who cares big whoop." Dochney gave his first fully "out-of-character" interview under his own name in April 2023, when he was profiled at The Ringer. The latter interview solidified his intent to be publicly identified under his personal name.

== Character and writing style ==
Dochney writes dril tweets in character, using an avatar of a blurry image of Jack Nicholson smiling and wearing sunglasses. Although there is no consistent narrative, the "voice" or "character" is considered highly distinctive. Writer Alexander McDonough called dril a "grinning Jack Nicholson with severe persecution and self-esteem issues, poor physical health, and a bizarre love/hate relationship with cops." Bijan Stephen at The Verge likened dril to an online version of the "wise fool" stock character.

Critics have described dril's voice as an amalgamation of ordinary Internet users, most of all those who are arrogant, obsessive, ignorant, or hapless. Professor of English literature Roger Bellin describes the character of dril as "generally a recognizable type: a self-important buffoon who's often raging out (show yourself, coward), or other times preening (buddy, they won't even let me), over some bit of nonsense that we're all meant to realize is absurdly unimportant." Vice reviewer Rachel Pick describes dril as "a bumbling, maladapted fool ... a pudgy, oily man, frequently in a state of undress, who doesn't go through life as much as he is spilled across it." According to The A.V. Club's Clayton Purdom, dril is a sort of patron saint of Internet users, or "your uncle's search history come to life and filtered through a scabrous comic sensibility, and ... possibly the most popular, beloved man on the entire internet (after, maybe, The Rock)." Christine Erickson at Mashable said dril's character was like "a spambot equivalent to the kind of crazy that Clint Eastwood portrays". At Kotaku, Gita Jackson called dril a "joke account that also inadvertently catalogues ... every way to be mad online".

In a lecture given at the University of Pennsylvania, American poet Patricia Lockwood described dril as a literary alter ego of Twitter users and the Internet in general. Comparing the account's persona to Ignatius J. Reilly, the protagonist of John Kennedy Toole's novel A Confederacy of Dunces (1980), Lockwood cited dril as an example of new possibilities in first-person narrative that could be explored online. Lockwood said of dril:

He is a master of tone, he is a master of character; his accidents are not accidents and his spelling mistakes are not mistakes. His character is the anonymous psycho of the comments box. He has been banned from every forum. He is all-present and nothing-knowing. He is the corn syrup addiction of America and he is an expired Applebee's coupon. We worship him in a big, nude church while the police blast Kenny Loggins and wait for us to come out. We will never come out. We like Kenny Loggins.

Dril's tweets are, in the words of Jordan Sargent at Gawker, a series of "quietly seething and unhinged avant-garde scribblings". His tweets are deliberately peppered with odd typos like misspelled words, grammatical mistakes, punctuation errors, and eggcorns. Yohann Koshy in Vice said dril's writing "reads like obscene nonsense verse—the syntax mutilated, the humour irredeemable". In the preface to his first book, dril called his writing style "Prestige Short Prose". Pick suggested that the phrase was likely "meant to make fun of the snobby lit theory types who want to make Dril out to be some highbrow art project", but she concluded it was an apt term to describe dril's style of "part art form, part jokes to read on the toilet". Pick also compared dril's writing to the surreal one-liner jokes of Jack Handey and the flash fiction short story "For sale: baby shoes, never worn". Jonah Engel Bromwich, in The New York Times, said dril was a major influence on the spread of dialogue, written in the same method as screenwriting, as a comedic writing style on Twitter.

Dril has been identified as one of the "most revered" and "quintessential" accounts associated with the "Weird Twitter" scene, a loose subculture of associated users who share a surreal, ironic, subversive sense of humor. dril was one of many Weird Twitter personalities who migrated to Twitter from Something Awful's FYAD board and carried over the forum's in-jokes and tone. Like others on Weird Twitter, dril's tweets have been described as having a dadaist sensibility. Writing for Complex, Brenden Gallagher compared dril to a musician who refuses to sell out or an auteurist indie filmmaker, as Twitter's version of "the enigmatic figure that even [an art form's] best known practitioners look to with reverence". Sean T. Collins described dril's humor as a "blend of fist-on-the-table bluster, abject confusion and burned-toast syntax", noting the influence of surreal humor found in Monty Python (especially the sketches from their show Monty Python's Flying Circus and Terry Gilliam's animations) and Adult Swim shows like Space Ghost Coast to Coast and Tim and Eric Awesome Show, Great Job! Collins called dril's tweets "a new way to be funny, with a rhythm and vocabulary all their own. I love it."

=== Motivation and satirical elements ===
Most of dril's writing is understood to be absurd, surreal, ironic, or nonsensical. An article about dril in The Oxford Student singled out this 2011 dril tweet as the account's guiding "manifesto":

Avatar of wint

wint
(@dril)
tweeted:

fuck "jokes". everything i tweet is real. raw insight without the horse shit. no, i will NOT follow trolls. twitter dot com. i live for this

October 13, 2011

Providing an ostensibly out-of-character statement to BuzzFeed for an oral history on "Weird Twitter" in 2013, dril commented on the nature of his work and motivation:

Twitter, as I understand it, is a sort of "Hell" that I was banished to upon death in my previous life. In this abstract realm, the only thing I am certain of is that my cries are awarded "Favs" or "RTs" when they are particularly miserable or profane. These ethereal merits do nothing to ease my suffering, but I have deliriously convinced myself that gathering enough of them will impress my unseen superiors and grant me a promotion to a higher plane of existence. This is my sole motivation.

In a 2017 Reddit AMA, he commented:

my friend told me to join twitter ten years ago and i thought it looked dumb as shit so i tried posting the worst things i could think of to destroy it and it didnt work

Dan Hitchens at Christian journal First Things noted, in an article about the use of irony on social media, that "[m]uch of the art of Twitter consists in appearing to put forward a position while giving the impression that you might be kidding", citing American author David Foster Wallace's warnings about the pervasiveness of irony in modern culture. According to Hitchens, dril is the "cult account that towers above the rest" in his mastery of irony, and dril's "inspired errors in spelling, logic, and decorum can only be produced by a clever creator, but the creator never lets the mask slip. Half the joke is our joint awareness of @dril's lack of self-awareness."

Although dril's content is typically absurd or nonsensical, some have noted an undercurrent of satire or social commentary in dril's tweets. Surveying Weird Twitter for Complex, Gallagher commented that dril's "vicious satire of conservatives, gamers, conspiracy theorists, and other less savory aspects of the Internet is always on point, always hilarious, always in character." Fellow Weird Twitter user @rare_basement said dril's "trolling [of] Penn State fans during the molestation scandal was so brilliant, always on the right side of the issue, but super funny and subtle about it." Although dril does not avow an explicit political identity, the account's politics are generally identified as leftist, an alignment common among Weird Twitter users. However, the abstraction and vagueness of dril's tweets have allowed them to be spread and repurposed by people of varying ideologies across the political spectrum. Celebrities, journalists, and former members of both Republican and Democratic presidential administrations follow dril, and even the far-right Breitbart News has quoted dril on its Twitter feed.

=== Family and other characters ===
Dril tweets often refer to his relationships with family members—particularly an unnamed wife/ex-wife, and numerous sons—in a manner reminiscent of father figures in American sitcoms like Married... with Children. Tom Whyman for The Outline described dril as "at once married and divorced (from the same essential 'wife')". Jia Tolentino, a staff writer for The New Yorker, credited dril as an originator of the "large adult son" trope. The trope, which Tolentino described as commonplace across social media and especially online sports journalism, involves particular observations of hapless male behavior that is "endlessly excusable: though [the large adult son] does nothing right, he can do no wrong." The character of dril repeatedly refers to his "sons", who are usually involved in the kind of "classic large-adult-son behavior" Tolentino describes as "alarming, with a whiff of the surreal". The sons are compared to Donald Trump's sons, particularly Donald Jr. and Eric Trump, as well as Mike Huckabee's sons. dril's regular posts about his disastrous marriage have also been compared to the wife guy stereotype that became popular in the late 2010s, of a man who gains attention on social media for posting about his wife, although dril's posts on the subject predate the emergence of this stereotype.

Besides the character's family, other fictitious recurring characters in dril's tweets are an internet user named 'digimonotis', with whom dril is locked in a flame war after a prior falling-out, and "the boys", a group of friends with similarly bizarre personality characteristics to dril.

== Influence ==
=== Impact on Internet slang ===
Like Dante or Shakespeare, Dril is a creator of vernacular: If you've ever tweeted about the boys being back in town, or bemoaned some group of people being at it again, or ruminated on things "they" won't even let you do, or asked for budgeting help because your family is dying, you're quoting Dril, maybe without even consciously realizing it by now ... [T]hrough sheer force of genius, his sense of humor has become everyone else's as well.

— Armin Rosen, Tablet

References to dril's tweets have become part of the vernacular of Internet slang. Some of dril's distinctive phrases have become so ubiquitous that they are used even by those who are unaware of the phrases' origin. Although dril's biggest influence is on Twitter, his tweets are also popular on other social media platforms—for example, meme-aggregating groups on Facebook commonly share his content, and several Tumblr users and trends have referenced and been influenced by dril. There was a Know Your Meme guide to dril in 2014, at a time when KYM pages for individual Twitter users were comparatively rare.

A common piece of conventional wisdom on Twitter holds that it is possible to find a dril Tweet that corresponds to virtually any situation or statement, leading to the saying "There's always a dril Tweet." As an example, the dril Tweet below has been widely referenced after a person apologizes for making a dramatically offensive and obviously incorrect statement:

Avatar of wint

wint
(@dril)
tweeted:

issuing correction on a previous post of mine, regarding the terror group ISIL. you do not, under any circumstances, "gotta hand it to them"

February 15, 2017

As described by Purdom, finding the dril tweet that matches an event or statement has become an online parlor game, made possible because dril had "rendered a tightly written comedic exaggeration of every daily outrage and conflict from the news cycle in which we find ourselves trapped." Purdom also found that dril's early preoccupations and sensibility had an outsized, "Velvet Underground-like influence on the tenor of the internet to come." By the end of 2017, the staff of Deadspin declared that "comparing everything to @dril" was a trend that "should die" in 2018, asserting that dril himself remained funny but dril comparisons had become an overused, lazy trope, because too many Twitter users were relying on dril references "as a substitute for an actual joke." Until 2021, dril's first tweet, "no", was used by dril as his "pinned tweet", a feature of Twitter that allows one tweet the user considers to be particularly important to be "pinned" out of chronological order at the top of a Twitter feed. Despite, or because of, its lack of context, it has amassed thousands of likes and retweets. According to Will Oremus at Slate, the popularity of the "no" tweet is an example of how "The metadata is the message" on social media, as metrics like retweets provide important context and carry independent meaning, akin to a laugh track on TV.

=== Satirical recontextualization ===
Other social media users frequently quote, recontextualize, or remix dril tweets for their own satirical purposes, and some accounts are even exclusively dedicated to this purpose. One such account, @EveryoneIsDril, shares screenshots of tweets by other people that look like dril's typing mannerisms. Another, "wint MP" or @parliawint, attaches dril tweets styled like teletext closed captions to images from BBC News of British politicians and journalists speaking. Although seemingly niche, the wint MP account garnered 14,000 followers by May 2017. Tom Dissonance, the creator of wint MP, attributed the account's success to its functioning as a joke on multiple levels, and for multiple audiences: "there are people who get the in-jokey references; there's a broader level of people who get politics and dril, and understand the significance of one commenting on another; and beyond that there are people who just appreciate an official figure in a suit saying something ridiculous. It's an onion of silliness." Koshy commented that wint MP "stands out from traditional forms of satire because it has no normative force. It recommends nothing about the way things should be. The political field it presents is slack-jawed, demented, putrid and amoral – there is no value beyond the scope of its image."

Not all satirical riffing on dril is political in nature; for example, the account @drilmagic attracted thousands of followers presenting mashups of dril tweets and cards from the game Magic: The Gathering. Ben Wilinofsky, a card player who contributed to @drilmagic, said the account and its format became a success because "Magic has a very self-serious lore that is great foil for an account that so often has the self-serious in its crosshairs." Several attempts have been made to create AI text generators (often manually curated) that create messages in the style of dril tweets.

=== Comparisons to Donald Trump ===
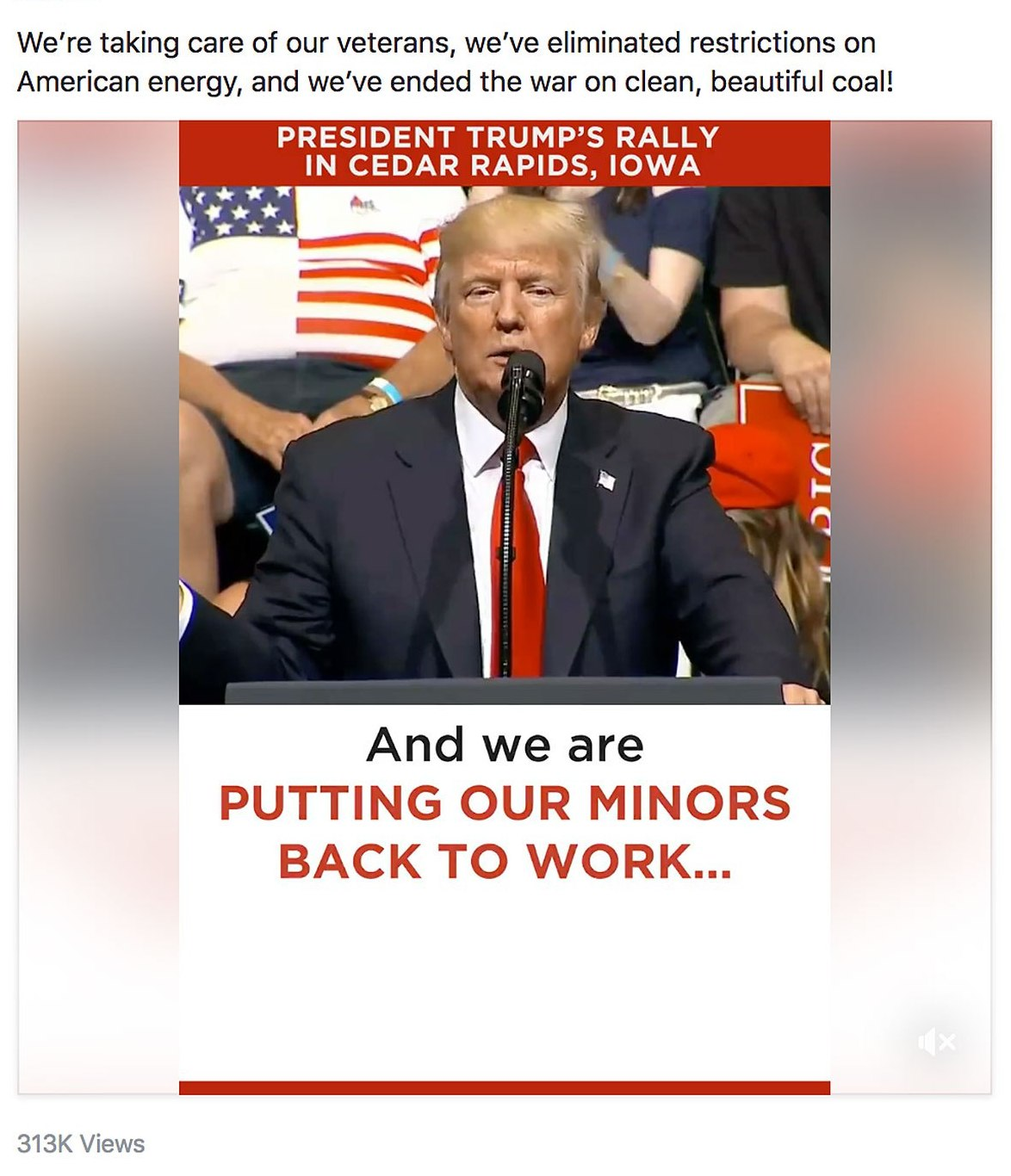
Screenshot of a Donald Trump video post on Facebook with a typo. Commentators have frequently drawn comparisons between Trump's social media presence and dril.

There are several people whose voices on social media are often compared to dril's—the musician and actor Ice-T is one—but Donald Trump is likely the most common comparison. Commentators have frequently compared dril to Trump (and vice versa), particularly Trump's voice on Twitter and other social media platforms. According to Purdom, "Both are aging, endlessly aggrieved white men who seemingly do not understand core components of the internet, yet they perfectly embody its anonymous rage, its ability to turn people into lunatics being swarmed and eaten alive by enemies and trolls."

In a 2016 article for New York magazine, Brian Feldman argued that Trump should choose dril as his vice-presidential running mate because the writer perceived commonalities between dril's "incoherent, libidinous, authoritarian comment-spam" and Trump's own campaign tweeting. In a joke about Trump's use of social media, journalist and MSNBC host Chris Hayes said that protestors should yell at Trump to log off to "see if they can get him to recreate that @dril Tweet", a reference to the following:

Avatar of wint

wint
(@dril)
tweeted:

who the fuck is scraeming 'LOG OFF' at my house. show yourself, coward. i will never log off

September 15, 2012

Eve Peyser, in a Gizmodo article declaring the 2016 presidential election was "the Weird Twitter election", had earlier compared the same dril tweet to the "tone, structure and message" of a Trump tweet. David Covucci at The Daily Dot coined "Dril's Law", an adage stating that "[f]or every single thing Donald Trump has tweeted, Dril did it earlier and better." Covucci also asked: "What if Donald Trump is @dril? Would it be any stranger than Donald Trump being president of the United States?" Responding to Covucci's question, Anna North wrote in The New York Times that "another explanation" for the similarity between dril and Trump "seems more likely: Donald Trump's Twitter presence isn't absurdist, it's just absurd."

=== "Corncob" ===
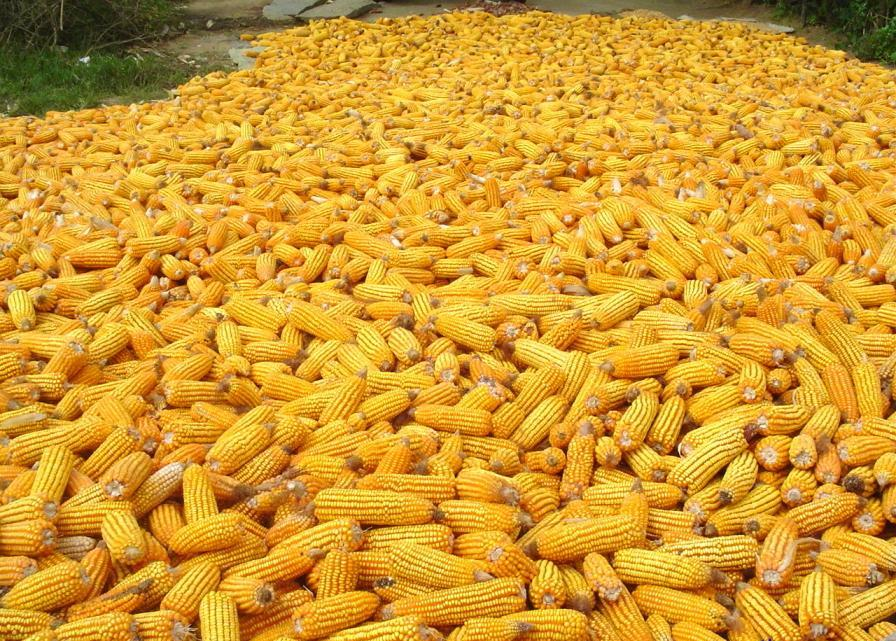
A large heap of corncobs. A misunderstanding over a reference to dril's "corncob" tweet led one journalist to quip: "The lesson here is clear. Always check for @dril references before you send that Tweet."

In 2011, dril tweeted the following:

Avatar of wint

wint
(@dril)
tweeted:

"im not owned! im not owned!!', i continue to insist as i slowly shrink and transform into a corn cob

November 10, 2011

The tweet describes an argument or similar situation in which one participant has clearly been "owned" but refuses to acknowledge it or to take a break, instead doubling down and insisting beyond any credibility that they have not been owned.

Shortly after it was posted, Twitter users began to use screenshots of the corncob tweet to point out when a person refused to acknowledge losing an argument or suffering some other humiliation. By 2017, the word "corncob" by itself had become common slang on Twitter for this purpose. The Ringer's Kate Knibbs observed that, while "corncob" as slang remained limited to communities on Twitter, the "corncob" archetype is universal and identifiable throughout contemporary culture. According to Knibbs, "the condition of being a corn cob—of allowing yourself to be defined by and reduced to a piercing insistence that a perceived slight has not diminished you—[has] spread far beyond a small corner of Twitter." Among public figures whose behavior was described as fitting the "corncob" archetype, Knibbs listed Donald Trump, Julian Assange, actress Louise Linton, Kim Kardashian's friend Jonathan Cheban, Kanye West (noting his numerous outbursts and 2016 song "Famous"), and Taylor Swift (noting her 2017 song "Look What You Made Me Do").

The term "corncob" became controversial after the reference was used in a meme with leftist criticisms of then-Senator (and later Vice President) Kamala Harris. The political commentator Al Giordano asserted, citing a dated Urban Dictionary definition of "corncobbed", that "[e]very cretin who has spread this meme needs to reckon with how it uses 'corncob', a rape culture and homophobic term popular among dudebros", confusing the word with the slang term cornhole. Neera Tanden, the president of the Center for American Progress and an advisor on Hillary Clinton's 2016 campaign, called on a Twitter user—an Ohio State student—to "denounce" the corncob meme. Various news publications reported on the story, and noted that the fast pace of Twitter discourse and unusual slang and in-jokes meant that a misunderstanding risked embarrassment and mocking. Amelia Tait, writer of an "internet dictionary" column in the New Statesman, even wrote that Giordano had "exposed [himself] as ignorant of online culture" and had, himself, been corncobbed.

The term resurfaced in March 2019, when the official campaign account for Senate Majority Leader Mitch McConnell used it to ridicule Alexandria Ocasio-Cortez by superimposing an image of a corncob onto Ocasio-Cortez's face.

=== "(((Keebler Elves)))" controversy ===
In June 2016, dril drew controversy for a tweet that used triple parentheses around the name of the corporate mascots of the cookie company Keebler:

Avatar of wint

wint
(@dril)
tweeted:

i refuse to consume any product that has been created by, or is claimed to have been created by, the (((Keebler Elves)))

June 28, 2016

Triple parentheses, or "echoes", are used online by the alt-right as an antisemitic symbol to highlight the names of Jews. Journalist Jay Hathaway wrote that most of dril's followers understood the tweet to be an ironic joke exploring the uncertain "etiquette around this very 2016 expression of bigotry ... Can a non-Jew apply the (((echoes))) to his own name as a show of allyship? Is it OK to use the parentheses in a joke at the white supremacists' expense? There's no clear consensus."

As the "(((Keebler Elves)))" tweet spread, some far-right accounts praised dril, interpreting the tweet as a covert signal of genuine antisemitic views. Others criticized the tweet as bigoted, or at least in poor taste, even if the intent was ironic. In response to the controversy, dril alternated between dismissing those who believed he was an antisemite and making sarcastic promises to become "less racist" with the help of donations. In the Jewish magazine Tablet, Armin Rosen called the tweet "an obviously satirical performance of anti-Jewish bigotry" and "the only funny anti-Semitism meta-controversy in the history of the internet."

=== Criticism of Elon Musk ===
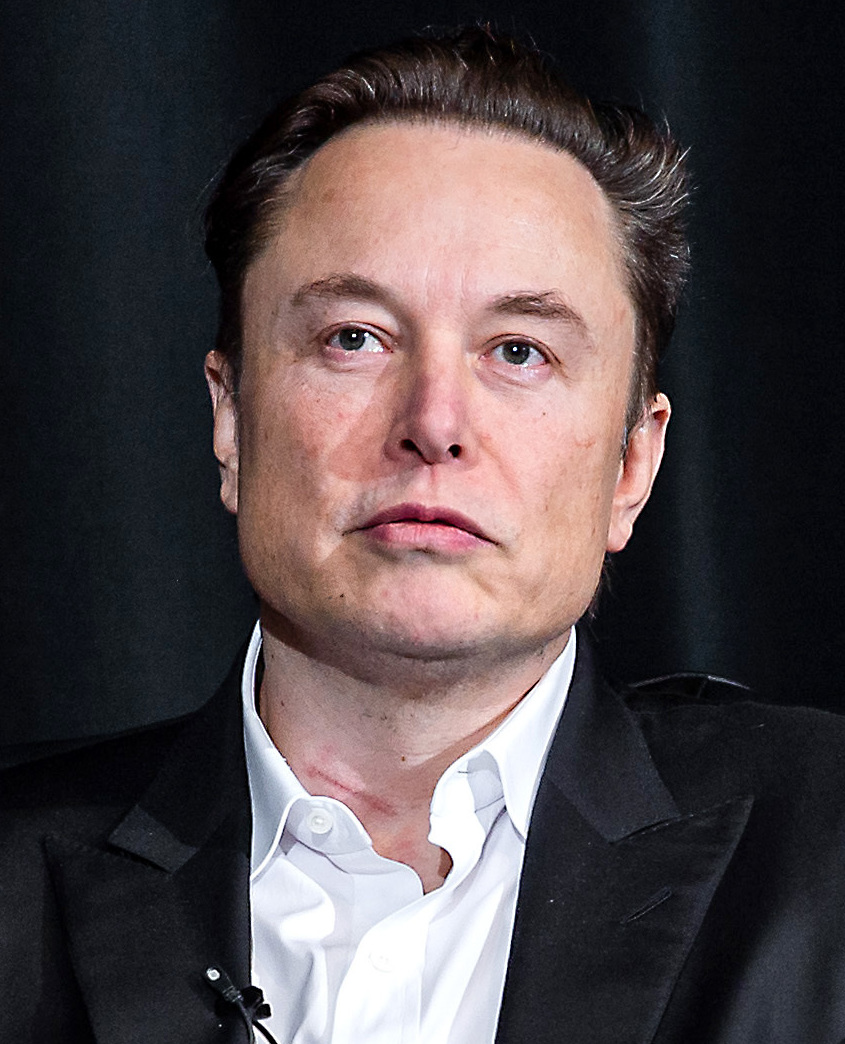
Dril criticized Twitter CEO Elon Musk (pictured in 2022) after his acquisition of Twitter, especially by promoting the slogan #BlockTheBlue to rebuke the new verification policy.

Dril has been outspoken in his criticism of Elon Musk's stewardship as CEO of Twitter, particularly Musk's changes to the Twitter verification system. On November 9, 2022, after Twitter began attaching blue checkmarks to paid Twitter Blue subscribers, dril said he would "absolutely block on sight" anyone with a paid blue checkmark and he started a #BlockTheBlue hashtag.

Avatar of wint

wint
(@dril)
tweeted:

you just paid $8 to eat my ass stupid #BlockTheBlue

November 9, 2022

Dril revived his #BlockTheBlue campaign in late April 2023, when Twitter removed checkmarks from legacy verified accounts, telling journalist Matt Binder, "I am actively rooting for the downfall of twitter. I hope to sabotage their efforts to become profitable, no matter how futile, in the hopes that they will eventually close up shop and release us all from this toilet." He described the users paying for Twitter Blue as "dead-eyed cretins who are usually trying to sell you something stupid" and "the most dog shit accounts on here."

On April 22, Twitter gave dril and Binder blue checks on their accounts, even though they had not subscribed to Twitter Blue. Dril then repeatedly changed his display name in an effort to remove the blue checkmark, which in turn was reinstated several times. His display name settled on "slave to Woke". Afterward, when numerous other legacy verified accounts were appended with involuntary blue checkmarks despite not paying for Twitter Blue, dril reposted a suggestion that the practice may violate the federal Lanham Act's prohibitions on false endorsements and quipped "its ok [Musk] fired the people in charge of telling him its illegal."

A few days later, dril created an account on Bluesky—a decentralized social network presented as an alternative to Twitter—during the app's invite-only early access phase. This made him the first bona fide celebrity user on the platform, according to Forbes. He described Twitter's algorithms as "more aggressively prioritizing moronic political commentators and crypto scammers" while not serving desired content, but cast doubt that Bluesky could remain a "last bastion against ad bots, AI crap, and nefarious algorithms" for so long as corporate executives had the opportunity "to break the dam so all that sewage can flow in".

== Other projects ==
In addition to his tweets, Dochney has many visual art side projects and collaborations with other artists. He has made several animations, including a short film titled COW-BOY (Note: dril (as "wint.co") (September 22, 2014). "cow-boy". YouTube.) and a fictional series about the attempts of South Park co-creator Trey Parker and Green Day drummer Tré Cool to rename the month of April "Treypril/Trépril" and "one policeman's mission to stop them at any cost." Dochney has expressed interest in creating further animated films, (Note: When asked about the status of the "Treypril" series on his Tumblr in April 2014, dril responded that "the police won", implying that the series was finished. He then posted used and unused image assets from the series.) but said he would prefer to work on projects separate from his "dril" identity.

Dochney worked on Bear Stearns Bravo, an interactive video series that was the sequel to the Horse ebooks Twitter account. He designed the cover of the 2016 vaporwave/funk album Cyber-Vision by Drew Fairweather ("Drew Toothpaste"), best known for the webcomics Toothpaste for Dinner and Married to the Sea. Dochney wrote for Hiveswap, a 2017 video game based on the webcomic Homestuck. Sweet Bro and Hella Jeff and the Quest for the Missing Spoon, a book based on a story within a story in Homestuck, lists dril as a contributing author and artist alongside Homestuck creator Andrew Hussie and Gunshow author KC Green. Dril was one of several artists who contributed illustrations for the card game The Devil's Level, based on the Twitter account da share z0ne.

In October 2019, dril announced that he and comedian Derek Estevez-Olsen were launching a web series called Truthpoint: Darkweb Rising for Adult Swim. The show, a parody of InfoWars, streams from Adult Swim's website on Wednesdays at midnight. In the series, Dochney performs as dril wearing a rubber mask of an old man's face. In February 2021, dril, Estevez-Olsen, and collaborator Pierce Campion released the short Virtual Prison as a pilot for a potential series on Adult Swim.

In February 2021, dril announced that he had begun developing a side-scrolling video game in his spare time, having done all the coding and artwork by himself until that point. With the working title copgame, the project "follows the quest of a silent protagonist who stumbles upon the gift of immortality in a dangerous future where Top Influencers and corrupt hollywood guys maintain a cruel grip on society."

=== Patreon account and books ===
In January 2017, dril opened a Patreon account for fans to make monthly payments in support of his tweets and various future projects, including "video, illustration, and long-form writing." On the Patreon, dril described his plans for two book projects: an elaborate art book "with a narrative adjacent to the 'Mythos' surrounding my posts" and a "best of"-style compilation of tweets as a coffee table book with bonus content. (Note: dril (February 21, 2017). "'what is this shit. why am i giving you money'". Patreon. Archived from the original on September 11, 2017.(subscription required)) The account's monthly revenue was $2,200 as of October 2017 and $1,468 as of April 2023. Dochney said he earned "as much money as a Kmart manager or something" from his Patreon and other dril-related endeavors, which are his primary source of income.

Dril published his first book, Dril Official "Mr. Ten Years" Anniversary Collection, in August 2018. The book compiles the account's best tweets from its first ten years, as selected by the author, along with new original illustrations. A second book, The Get Rich and Become God Method, was published in 2020. His third, The Dril Archives, was published in December 2022. It contains 10,000 posts and was released simultaneously in four editions, each being a different ordering: chronologically (titled Eternal), alphabetically (Refined), by most likes (Beloved) and randomly (Chaotic). Dril revealed he had written another book, titled How to Cheat at Casino Games by Being a Bitch, at a Truthpoint live performance in January 2023, when a supposed raffle to give a single copy of the book to an audience member instead ended with dril ripping up the printed manuscript in a performative rage. The pages were thrown to the crowd; based on recovered portions of the text, How to Cheat at Casino Games by Being a Bitch did appear to be a new original comedic narrative, not just a stage prop for the show.

== Reception and following ==
Over time, dril has grown from a relatively obscure Twitter account with a small cult following to a widely followed, well-known account on the site. In October 2012, dril had only 23,000 followers. That number had grown to 166,000 by December 2014, and then 567,000 by May 2017. As of January 2021, dril had reached 1.6 million followers. Unlike most comedians with large Twitter followings, dril became popular without a public reputation or career outside of the platform. In March 2023, a report from the media outlet Platformer revealed that Twitter had included dril on a secret list of 35 "VIP" accounts whose reach was amplified by its algorithms, alongside such users as Twitter CEO Elon Musk, President Joe Biden, and basketball star LeBron James.

Following dril has often been described—sometimes in a half-serious or tongue-in-cheek manner, other times sincerely—as one of the few good uses of Twitter. In November 2017, shortly after the doxing incident, dril was called "arguably the most iconic Twitter account in the history of social media [and] practically internet royalty" in The A.V. Club and "one of the internet's most unlikely treasures" in Slate. In December 2019, Katie Notopoulos of BuzzFeed News called dril "Without a doubt [...] the most important person on Twitter of the 2010s."

We can thank Twitter for mobilizing dissent, humanizing celebrities, and @dril.

— Clayton Purdom, The A.V. Club

Dril's writing has been praised by a variety of public figures, including poet Patricia Lockwood; actor-comedians Rob Delaney and David Cross; The New Yorker staff writer Adrian Chen; and Reply All hosts PJ Vogt and Alex Goldman. In 2019, British writer Tom Whyman argued (in earnest) that dril should be considered for the Nobel Prize in Literature as "the one true poet of the internet age"; in Whyman's view, recognizing dril's writing as literature would be equivalent to historical shifts in the definition of "art" prompted by avant-garde works by artists like Marcel Duchamp and Andy Warhol.

=== Acclaim for the account generally ===
@dril is frequently listed among the funniest or best Twitter accounts. In 2012, The Daily Dot cited dril as one of the funniest accounts on Twitter and noted that reading dril's "[d]arkly funny ... odd, provocative, and clever" tweets "simultaneously brings a sense of head-scratching wonder and slightly uncomfortable chortles." Max Read, then an editor of Gawker, named dril one of the publication's "heroes" of 2013 in a year-in-review piece. According to Read, dril's writing stood out in a paranoid web landscape overrun by spambots and covert corporate marketing:

Dril is not a bot. Dril is not a human. Dril is a psychic Markov chain whose input is the American internet. Dril is an intestine swollen with gas and incoherent politics and obscure signifiers and video-game memes and bile. Dril will not lie to you. Dril will not fool you. Dril is not a hoax. Dril is not a put-on. Dril is the only writer on the internet you can trust.

Paste included dril on its lists of best Twitter accounts every year between 2013 and 2016, and the comedy site Splitsider (later merged into Vulture) named dril one of the funniest accounts of 2017. The Pen & Pencil Club, a Philadelphia-based journalism association, nominated dril for an award honoring the best "Non-Traditional News Provider" of 2017; he lost. For a March 2019 feature commemorating the 30th anniversary of Tim Berners-Lee's invention of the World Wide Web, The Verge listed @dril among the greatest websites, people, and technologies in web history. Later that year, The A.V. Club ranked dril sixth on its list of the "best, worst, and weirdest things" on the Internet in the 2010s.

=== Acclaim for individual tweets ===
Individual dril tweets have also been lauded by the press. At the occasion of Twitter's tenth anniversary, both GQ and Newsweek named this dril tweet among the best and/or funniest tweets of all time:

Avatar of wint

wint
(@dril)
tweeted:

Food $200

Data $150
Rent $800
Candles $3,600
Utility $150

someone who is good at the economy please help me budget this. my family is dying

September 29, 2013

The same tweet had also been listed among the site's funniest by BuzzFeed in 2014. The "corncob" tweet was listed as the 8th most "canonical" tweet of all time in 2017 by Mic, whose Miles Klee wrote it was "categorically impossible" to select the single best dril tweet. Another dril tweet—"IF THE ZOO BANS ME FOR HOLLERING AT THE ANIMALS I WILL FACE GOD AND WALK BACKWARDS INTO HELL"—was ranked among the site's "greatest" by Thought Catalog in 2013. Slate counted one of his tweets among the best sentences written in 2017, ranking dril alongside such writers as Umberto Eco, Ta-Nehisi Coates, Anne Carson, Mohsin Hamid, Jennifer Egan, Durga Chew-Bose, John Darnielle, and Daniel Dennett.

== See also ==
- Twitterature
- Horse ebooks
- da share z0ne
- Ken M
- Extremely Online
