= KENM =

KENM or KenM may refer to:

- KENM (FM), a radio station in New Mexico
- Ken M, Internet troll
