= Wife guy =

Man famous for posting about his wife on social media

On social media, a wife guy is a man whose fame or public persona substantially revolves around his wife. The term has also been applied to men who leverage their spouse to enhance social standing or brand themselves as trustworthy or relatable. Its meaning has consequently extended beyond people who become known primarily through their social media posts to established celebrities and other public figures.

== History ==
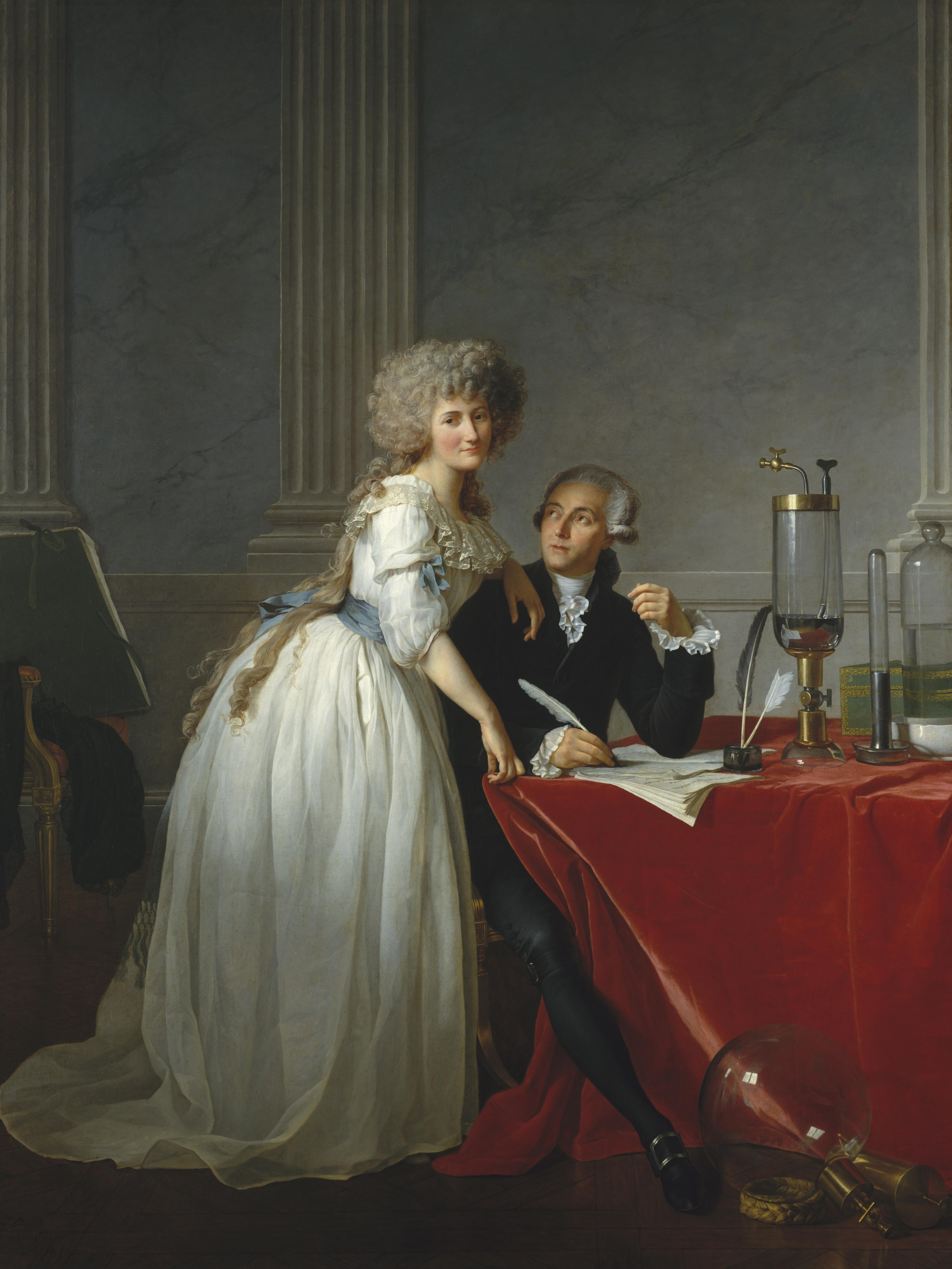
18th-century French chemist Antoine Lavoisier, noted as an early wife guy, with his spouse Marie-Anne

The term began circulating online alongside memes about wives, notably a much-parodied "Email to my girlfriend's husband" in 2016. Commentary on the phenomenon has also connected it to the recurring "my wife" joke from the 2006 film Borat.

Robbie Tripp's viral 2017 Instagram post praising his spouse led media to dub him the "curvy wife guy," and the label was discussed widely in 2019 coverage across major U.S. outlets. The post was initially praised as a statement of body positivity, but also attracted criticism for its perceived self-congratulatory tone.

Many outlets have traced antecedents for the trope. The Weird Twitter account dril is often cited for satirizing a hapless, off-screen wife character, while a 2022 Slate essay retroactively characterizes Antoine Lavoisier as a prototypical "wife guy" whose public image was shaped with the help of his wife, Marie-Anne. The couple appeared together in a 1788 portrait by Jacques-Louis David, and Marie-Anne contributed drawings and records to Lavoisier's scientific work. A 2020 article in El País suggested John Lennon as an earlier example, citing the central place of his marriage to Yoko Ono in his public and artistic life. The Washington Post has similarly applied the label retrospectively to Prince Philip, Duke of Edinburgh, in discussing his public role alongside Elizabeth II. The New Yorker also points to post-women's liberation literary fiction with titles such as The Time Traveler's Wife and The Zookeeper's Wife, as well as film adaptations such as The Wife, in discussing the cultural prominence of wives and the ways public adoration can erase a wife's own subjectivity.

== Later usage and backlash ==
In late 2022, the term re-entered mainstream discourse amid several high-profile cases of infidelity. Time described Ned Fulmer—then a member of YouTube group The Try Guys—as the group's "wife guy" whose brand centered on public adoration of his spouse, contextualizing his departure from the group after admitting to "a consensual workplace relationship." The article discussed how the episode was compared online to contemporaneous allegations involving Adam Levine and to discourse surrounding comedian John Mulaney. Coverage in Vanity Fair explicitly framed the moment as a cautionary tale for self-described "wife guys."

By the mid-2020s, several writers argued that "wife guy" had shifted from a tongue-in-cheek descriptor to a more general pejorative for perceived performative spousal devotion. In 2025, The Atlantic described how the label "curdled into the plainly pejorative," while also defending sincere public affection toward one's spouse. In a 2024 Vanity Fair interview, country singer Thomas Rhett distinguished his public references to his marriage from the online persona associated with the term.

== Assessments ==
The New York Times compared wife guys to incels, who define themselves by their inability to find a partner, in that wife guys define themselves by having found one, and expect to be congratulated for it. The paper also considered the "wife guy" phenomenon to reflect the changed status of marriage from societal default to personal achievement. Similarly, MEL Magazine wrote that wife guys treated their wives as "legitimizing for a male web celebrity," and as "a measure of the husband's influence." Some outlets have argued that public figures and politicians often seek to be seen as a wife guy, in order to be seen as trustworthy and non-threatening. In 2019, The Washington Post discussed the term in connection with several candidates for the 2020 Democratic Party presidential primaries who had named their wives as their personal heroes. Media scholars Anthony P. McIntyre and Diane Negra have examined the wife guy as a form of public masculinity, arguing that the trope places the display of marital affection within broader debates about celebrity, gender and marriage.
