= Robbie Tripp =

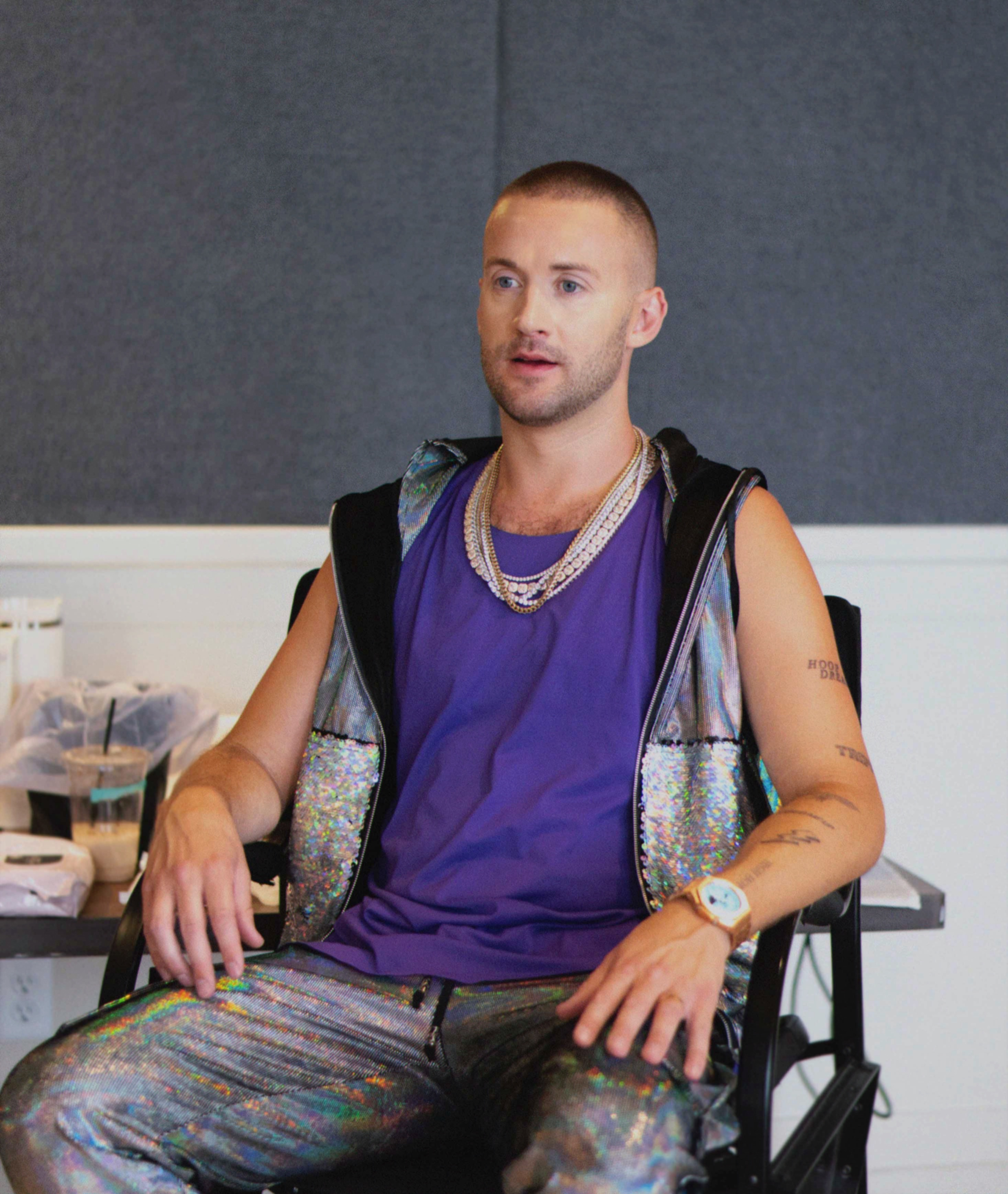
- Tripp in 2024

Background information
- Origin: Las Vegas, Nevada, U.S.
- Genres: Hip hop; Pop rap
- Occupations: Rapper; internet personality; social media influencer; author; entrepreneur
- Years active: 2017–present
- Label: Desert Money Media (Independent)
- Spouse: Sarah Tripp (m. 2014)
- Website: robbietripp.com

TikTok information
- Page: robbietripp
- Followers: 1.1 million
- Last updated: 7 April 2025

Robbie Tripp is an American rapper and internet personality. He first rose to fame in 2017 and was dubbed the "curvy wife guy" by the media. After releasing his debut single "Chubby Sexy" in 2019, Tripp was credited by The New York Times for pioneering the "wife guy" phenomenon in internet culture. He has since collaborated with RiFF RAFF, BlocBoy JB, Dizzy Wright, and Jahlil Beats.

== Early life ==
Tripp was born in Utah and spent his formative and teenage years playing competitive basketball. At 13 years old, he was chosen as of one of 10 participants across the United States to participate in Shaquille O'Neal's Hot Shots Camp.

In high school, Tripp finished his prep career as one of the top leading scorers in the state of Utah. In the 2008-2009 season, Tripp ranked #3 among statewide leaders in points per game, behind future BYU all-time leading scorer Tyler Haws and future NBA first round draft pick CJ Wilcox. Robbie was recruited to continue his basketball career at the junior college (JUCO) level, playing shooting guard for Hartnell College where he competed in the Coast Conference of the CCCAA (California's community college athletics system most notably featured in Netflix's sports documentary series Last Chance U: Basketball.)

== Career ==
In 2014, Tripp and his wife Sarah were married and later moved to San Francisco to pursue careers as content creators and influencers. He spent his early career as a writer and public speaker, most notably contributing to Entrepreneur and The Huffington Post. He is the author of Create Rebellion (2015). Tripp gave a TEDx talk about the Millennial generation at the inaugural TEDxSalinas event.

Robbie Tripp's Instagram tribute to his wife received international attention in 2017, garnering polarizing reactions and wide-ranging conversations online on the topic of body positivity. The viral post received significant media coverage worldwide as it became a trending topic across social media platforms, eventually becoming known as the "I love my curvy wife" post that pioneered the "wife guy" phenomenon online.

In 2023, Tripp founded Desert Money Media, Inc., a media and production company that creates and distributes his music and creative content.

== Music career ==
In 2019, Robbie Tripp released his debut single "Chubby Sexy" and its official music video featuring his wife and other plus-size models. The video was featured as a "Moment of the Year" by GQ Magazine in its annual "Men of the Year" issue. Tripp was profiled by Vox leading up to the release of the song and music video. "Chubby Sexy" caught the attention of internet culture reporters, making headlines and generating strong reactions online.

In 2020, Tripp released his second single "Luka Doncic", a nod to the eponymous NBA-All Star and Slovenian basketball player. The song's official music video received media coverage overseas and eventually caught the attention of Dallas Mavericks owner Mark Cuban who requested it be played pre-game at American Airlines Center. Later that summer, Tripp released a third single, "White T-Shirt" produced by Grammy Award-winning producer Jahlil Beats, with an official music video shot in his hometown of Las Vegas.

In 2021, Tripp released his collaboration with RiFF RAFF for their single and music video "Flamingo Freestyle". Later that year, Tripp released his song "Suns in 4" in collaboration with syndicated iHeart Radio host Johnjay Van Es as a Phoenix Suns anthem during the 2021 NBA Playoffs. The song was named "Song of the Year" by the Phoenix New Times.

In 2022, Robbie Tripp's breakout single "Big Girl Banger" went viral on TikTok, starting a trend of curvy and plus-size women across the world dancing to the song. Earlier that same year, Tripp performed with fellow Las Vegas emcee Dizzy Wright at Allegiant Stadium for the release of "Raider Gang (All Black Everything)", an anthem for the city's Las Vegas Raiders during the 2022 NFL playoffs.

In 2023, Tripp released the official music video for his single "Basic Bro" on his YouTube channel, starring Sports Illustrated Swimsuit curve model Ella Halikas. Tripp also collaborated with BlocBoy JB to shoot the music video for his single “They Said” in Las Vegas. Tripp later released a collaboration with rapper Lil Seeto for single and music video "Money Honey".

In the summer of 2023, Tripp released his single "I Wanna Have Fun...", produced by 3-time Grammy Award-winning producer, Andrew Dawson, a longtime mixing engineer/producer for Kanye West's best-selling albums.

In October 2023, Robbie Tripp was included in a "Top 5 Artists of 2023" list published by Billboard.

On October 4, 2024, Tripp released his debut EP, DESERT MONEY MIXTAPE. The EP, released independently of a label, debuted atop the featured bestselling Top Hip-Hop Albums chart on iTunes.

In 2025, Tripp appeared on Utah's KTVX Morning Show "Good Things Utah" to discuss his single "OUT IN UTAH", inspired by his "mountain basketball roots" and "filled with references of Utah (Jazz) hoops legends.”

On October 10, 2025, Robbie Tripp released his first full-length mixtape SOUTHWEST SUPERSTAR, marking his debut album-length project with 10 tracks, including the hit single "THICK CHICK".

== Personal life ==
Tripp lives in Las Vegas, Nevada with his wife, Sarah Tripp, a personal style blogger and influencer. They have three children together.

Tripp's older brother, Ryan Tripp, was the Guinness World Record holder from 1998-2000 for the world's longest ride on a lawnmower. In 1997, Ryan traveled 3,116 miles from Salt Lake City to Washington D.C. on a riding lawnmower, with his father driving behind in a truck, to raise awareness for organ and tissue donation while setting the world record.
