= Dril Official "Mr. Ten Years" Anniversary Collection =

Book by Internet personality 'dril'

- Author: dril
- Illustrator: dril
- Publisher: Self-published
- Publication date: August 21, 2018
- Pages: 420
- ISBN: 978-1724941688

Dril Official "Mr. Ten Years" Anniversary Collection is the first book by dril, a pseudonymous Twitter user known for his absurdist humor. The book is the author's compilation of the account's best tweets from its first ten years, alongside new original illustrations. The tweets are sorted into sections by topic. The book was self-published in paperback and ebook formats. According to the preface, dril published the book in print so that his tweets would survive a future societal collapse and digital dark age.

The book received generally positive reviews, with praise directed at dril's distinctive humor and creativity. Although the book's written material was already available online for free, critics generally agreed that the compilation's quality and dril's influence justified its publication.

== Development and publication ==
The @dril Twitter account began posting in September 2008; in the years that followed, dril became well known for his idiosyncratic humor and accrued a cult following. In January 2017, dril opened a Patreon account for fans to make monthly payments in support of his tweets and future projects, including "video, illustration, and long-form writing." On the Patreon, dril described his plans for two book projects:

BOOK #1: Just absolutely, cover to cover, the worst bullshit imaginable [...] all loosely tied together with a narrative adjacent to the 'Mythos' surrounding my posts. [...] BOOK #2: a lot of people ask me for a 'Best of' release, like some kind of coffee table book of my top posts, and while I think a book containing nothing but short messages you can easily dig up online would be sort of Shitty, I decided to make it worthwhile by filling the thing up with new stuff as well.

dril self-published the compilation project as Dril Official "Mr. Ten Years" Anniversary Collection in August 2018. It was released in paperback and ebook formats. It was initially made available to download for Amazon Kindle, but was subsequently withdrawn from that format. On his Patreon, dril explained that the Kindle version was withdrawn because it was "displaying incorrectly". Afterward, the book became available as a PDF.

== Content ==
The 420-page book compiles 1,500 of the account's best posts from its first ten years, as selected by the author. The compiled tweets are sorted into topic areas by chapter, which are presented alphabetically. Individual tweets do not include the date they were originally published. The book features 70 new illustrations by dril. According to dril's preface, he published the book to preserve his posts in the event of a societal collapse that takes Twitter's servers offline. dril predicts a "miserable, Offline Hell" of the future in which his posts have been "Permanently Decommissioned by FEMA due to some Jade Helm 15 bull shit", referring to conspiracy theories about FEMA camps and the Jade Helm 15 military training exercise. dril says the book is a means to preserve his content in the aftermath of a civilization collapse and digital dark age:

This book is, without a doubt, the Svalbard Global Seed Vault, of posts, designed to withstand the fall of civilization and ensure that my invaluable Content permeates the hearts and minds of post-collapse generations, in order to prevent the whole of humanity from reverting to the way of the cave man.

The book is sorted into 72 sections, sorted alphabetically by topic or theme:

- Animals
- Ass
- BBQ
- Beauty & Fashion
- Beer
- Birds
- Brands
- Cars
- Charity & Activism
- Crime & Punishment
- Death
- Deep State
- Diaper
- Dick
- DigimonOtis
- Dining
- Disease & Medicine
- Dogs
- Drugs & Smoking
- Dumb Asses
- Economy & The Markets
- Fast Food
- Fatherhood
- Gaming
- Gender
- Girls
- God & Religion
- Grab Bag
- Ground Hog
- Guns
- Halloween
- Halo
- Holidays
- Hollywood
- James Bond
- Jeans
- Life Hacks
- Luxury
- Mayor
- Military
- Money
- Muscle & Fitness
- Music
- News
- Nine Eleven
- Nostalgia
- Nudity
- Obama
- Online
- Parkour
- Pigs
- Piss
- Police
- Politics
- Racism
- Rants
- Rats
- Sex
- Shit
- Sorrow
- Sports
- Tech
- Teens
- Television
- The Boys
- Toilet
- Tough Guys
- Trolls
- Twitter
- Wife
- Wisdom
- You Tube [sic]

== Reception ==
In an article for Vice, Peter Slattery wrote "[o]rdinarily, throwing together a book full of old tweets would seem pretty lazy, but given how much legit influence dril has had on Twitter humor and online culture at large, everybody probably owes the account at least 20 bucks." Reviewing the book for Vice, Rachel Pick concluded that the book was worth it "so that one day, centuries from now, after the bombs go off and EMPs take out the electrical grid, long after Twitter has died, a solitary wanderer may find a scrap of paper buried in the ruins of my Brooklyn apartment building, and they will lift it up to the dying sun and squint through their protective goggles to read a dril tweet." Bijan Stephen at The Verge said that, "[d]espite literally being a book of tweets, Mr. Ten Years chronicles Dril's rise from a funny writer to a writer who's defined the way people write and think about internet culture."

Writing for HuffPost, Sean T. Collins called the book "simply too funny for me to read for more than a page or two at a time without laughing so hard, I feel physically ill." At Geek.com, Jordan Minor called the book a "glorious exception" to the expectation that online jokes taken offline can only result in "cursed", mediocre "nightmares like Shit My Dad Says: The TV Show". Minor praised dril's illustrations, which he said "flesh out the look of the character beyond his Jack Nicholson roots" and show "there are a bunch of ways to depict a gross old parody internet man in sunglasses." In an essay for the online men's lifestyle magazine Mel Magazine, Miles Klee praised the book's section on "Tough Guys". According to Klee, the tweets in that section "beautifully deconstructed" some men's "commitment to archaic notions of dudely stoicism" and demonstrated "the character's inability to confess weakness, shame or error."

At Bluesky, a decentralized social network formed in 2019 as an alternative to Twitter, new employees reportedly received print copies of the "Mr. Ten Years" Collection as part of the company's onboarding process. When TechCrunch reached out for confirmation, a Bluesky employee replied: "It Is The Public Stated Policy Of Bluesky PBLLC That All New Employees Shall Receive The Finest @dril.bsky.social Tweets In Printed Form."
