= Ella Halikas =

American model and social media influencer

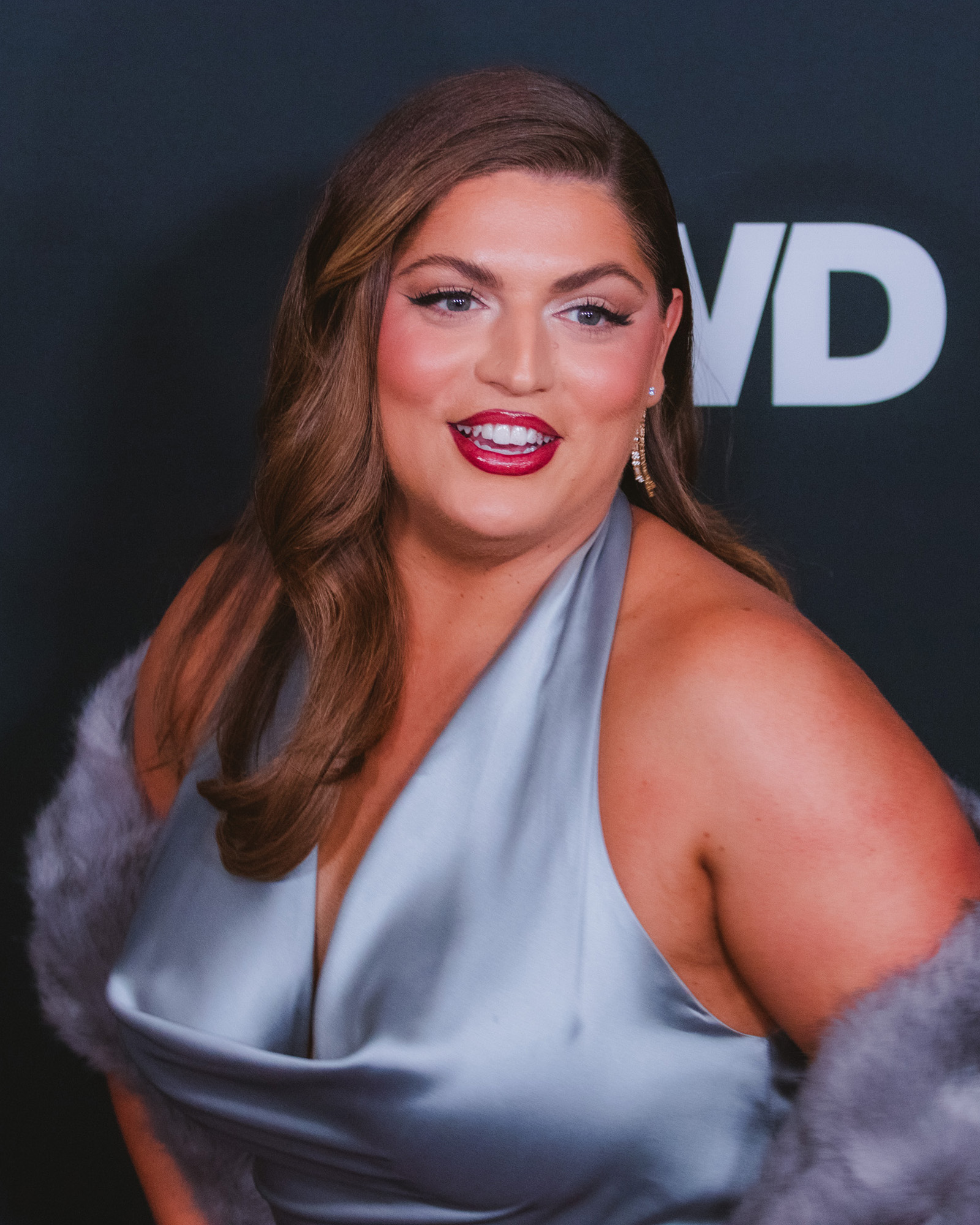
- Halikas in 2026
- Born: Walnut Creek, California, U.S.
- Education: Washington State University; University of Hawaiʻi at Mānoa
- Occupations: Model; TikToker; Activist
- Relatives: Eliana Mason (cousin)
- Modeling information
- Height: 5 ft 7 in (170 cm)
- Hair color: Brown
- Eye color: Brown
- Agency: Ford Models

Instagram information
- Page: Ella Halikas
- Followers: 458 K

TikTok information
- Page: ellahalikas
- Followers: 914.8 K
- Last updated: September 28, 2026
- Website: www.ellahalikas.com

Gabriella Athena Halikas is an American model, social media personality, and body positivity activist. A plus-size model, she appeared in advertisements for JCPenney and Snapchat before becoming a Sports Illustrated Swimsuit Issue model in 2021. Halikas walked the runway at Miami Swim Week in 2020 and 2021.

== Early life and education ==
Halikas grew up in Walnut Creek, a town in the San Francisco Bay Area. She is Greek American and was raised in the Greek Orthodox faith. She is a cousin of goalball player Eliana Mason. Halikas studied at Washington State University before transferring to the University of Hawaiʻi at Mānoa, where she graduated in 2019.

== Career ==
In 2020, Halikas lost her job as a waitress at a restaurant in San Francisco due to the COVID-19 pandemic and moved to Los Angeles to pursue modelling and social media influencing. She was scouted by a modeling agent on Instagram, based in San Francisco. Halikas was featured in commercials for JCPenney and Snapchat. Halikas later signed with Ford Models as a model and content creator. In 2021, Halikas was featured in Sports Illustrated Swimsuit Issue. She was photographed by Yu Tsai in Atlantic City, New Jersey for the magazine spread. In July 2021, she walked the runway at Miami Swim Week for Berry Beachy Swimwear, Cupshe, and VDM The Label. She had previously walked in Miami Swim Week in 2020.

Halikas is a public speaker and activist for body positivity and confidence. She uses her TikTok and Instagram accounts to promote body positivity. She partnered with the Canadian company Pebbles & Palms to launch a plus-size swimwear line.

In March 2023, Halikas was featured in Robbie Tripp's music video for his song Basic Bro.

== Personal life ==
In 2022, Halikas and plus-size model Alexa Jay were reportedly barred entry from The Highlight Room, an exclusive club Los Angeles. They posted about their experience on TikTok, claiming that they were denied entry because of their weight. The video received over one million views.
