= Ken M =

American Internet troll

- Born: Kenneth McCarthy c. 1980; Florida, U.S.
- Occupation: Copywriter
- Known for: Internet trolling

Kenneth McCarthy (born c. 1980), popularly known as Ken M, is an Internet troll known for his comments on news websites such as Yahoo! and The Huffington Post. Unlike the more common associations for the term troll on the internet, Ken's comments are usually benign, with his comments displaying a comical lack of understanding of the featured topic, while other commenters take him seriously.

== Background ==
Ken M worked as a copywriter for Comedy Central and a columnist for CollegeHumor, and started posting to comments sections as Ken M in 2011 on various websites, mostly Yahoo! and The Huffington Post. He has said that his aim was to "turn a toxic space into a source of belly laughter." His absurd comments over the years made him widely considered one of the most prolific Internet trolls ever, gaining thousands of fans on Facebook, Twitter, his subreddit, and Tumblr where he posts screenshots of all his comments as HorseySurprise-Blog. Ken M was named one of the most influential people on the Internet by Time in 2016 and 'The Rembrandt of Yahoo Comment Trolling' by Uproxx.

== Internet character ==
Ken M has been described as "just an ill-informed old dude". McCarthy is an advocate of "do no harm" trolling. He has expressed his dislike for the term "troll" due to the negative connotations it carries.

== See also ==
- Poe's law
- dril
