= Catturd =

American X user (born 1964)

- Born: Phillip Buchanan; September 18, 1964 (age 62)
- Movement: Right-wing politics; American Conservatism

X information
- Handle: @catturd2
- Display name: Catturd ™
- Years active: 2018–present
- Followers: 4 million
- Last updated: November 28, 2025

Catturd (born September 18, 1964) is the online identity of right-wing American X user and Internet troll Phillip Buchanan. The account is known for spreading conspiracy theories and misinformation.

== Online activity ==
Media Matters for America has accused Buchanan of violating Twitter's platform manipulation policy, attempting to boost hashtags into the trending topics list.

When Elon Musk acquired Twitter, Buchanan was enthusiastic about the purchase; the two had also previously replied to each other on the platform. Buchanan praised Musk for plans to scale back Twitter's content moderation, but said his account remained shadowbanned even after the purchase. Musk reached out personally to provide support. Later on, Buchanan tweeted that he was "100% wrong about [Elon Musk] changing Twitter." In March 2023, leaked internal documents from Twitter revealed that Catturd was among a handful of accounts having their reach artificially inflated by Twitter under Musk.

The same month, Buchanan conducted a Twitter poll of a hypothetical 2024 Republican presidential primary between Trump and Florida governor Ron DeSantis, showing Trump winning 69%. This poll was presented by Trump at a rally and by Trump-affiliated super PAC MAGA Inc. on Twitter.

== Political views ==
Buchanan supported Trump's attempts to overturn the results of the 2020 election and has promoted conspiracy theories about the Russo-Ukrainian War, the FBI search of Mar-a-Lago, U.S. Senator John Fetterman, the attempted assassination of Donald Trump in Florida, Hurricane Milton, and the perpetrator of the 2025 Coeur d'Alene shooting.

== Personal life ==
Buchanan was born on September 18, 1964. He lives on a ranch in Wewahitchka, Florida.
