= Herb (company) =

- Type: Private
- Industry: Cannabis; Media; Entertainment
- Predecessor: The Stoner's Cookbook
- Founded: 2006; 20 years ago in
- Headquarters: Toronto, Ontario, Canada
- Key people: Matt Gray (CEO)
- Number of employees: 15 (2019)
- Website: herb.co

Herb is a cannabis media and commerce company. Herb promotes the use of cannabis as a medical and therapeutic drug, as well as the culture of cannabis consumption. It runs a website which publishes cannabis-related content.

== History ==
The company was founded in 2006 as The Stoner’s Cookbook and was created in New Zealand by founders Lucas Young and Daniel Crothers. The pair of web-developers created The Stoner's Cookbook as an online cannabis recipe database. The website was largely populated by user-generated content and by 2009 it had become the most visited cannabis recipe website on the internet.

In 2014, Matt Gray joined as CEO to help scale the company. Matt Gray previously co-founded Bitmaker, a technology skills accelerator, that was eventually sold to General Assembly. The Stoner's Cookbook was then expanded to include cannabis news, a strain database and videos. In 2015, the company released the cookbook “Herb; Mastering The Art Of Cooking With Cannabis”. Written by Laurie Wolf and photographed by Bruce Wolf, the cookbook was over 200-pages long and was created to “elevate the art and science of cooking with cannabis”. The success of this book, led the company to rebrand to Herb. Later in 2015, Matt Gray acquired the company now known as Herb and continued improving the brand.

In August 2017, Herb announced $4.1 million seed funding raised from multiple venture capital firms including Lerer Hippeau Ventures, Slow Ventures, Bullpen Capital, Joe Montana's Liquid 2 Ventures and Shopify CEO and COO Tobi Lutke and Harley Finkelstein. In January 2018, Herb launched a new design of its site.

In 2017, Herb expanded to New York City and Los Angeles. Toronto was chosen as the location of Herb's headquarters after it was announced that Canada would be legalizing cannabis on October 17, 2018. Herb currently has over 40 employees.

On April 20, 2020, Herb launched Herb Pickup: "Cannabis For You, Near You". A platform that helps users find cannabis products and its availability at stores closest to them.

=== Reception ===
Harley Finkelstein, the COO of Shopify, told The Globe and Mail that Herb reminded him of "the story when Rolling Stone Magazine came onto the scene." Eric Hippeau, the former CEO of Huffington Post told Leafly that Herb is "the go-to place for consumers, brands, and anyone who’s looking for information about the industry."

== Video Content ==
In 2017, Herb began expanding into video to reach larger audiences. In January 2018, Herb achieved 300 Million monthly video viewers.

=== Game Changers ===
Herb produces Game Changers, a video series about former and current professional athletes that use cannabis in their daily lives to show that cannabis is for achievers. The series has featured former NFL players Marvin Washington, Eben Britton, Grant Mattos, Jim McMahon and Leonard Marshall.

=== Cannabis Longley ===
Herb produces Cannabis Longley, a comedy skit video series performed by Ryan Longley. The series is based on relatable situations cannabis enthusiasts experience.

=== Strain Stories ===
Herb produces Strain Stories, a video series that covers the origin stories of strain names. The series reveals the rich histories of popular strains like Charlotte's Web and Lamb's Bread.

=== Wake and Break ===
Formerly known as Just Being Blunt, Wake and Break is a digital video series that discusses events and headlines in the cannabis industry. Recently, Damian Abraham formerly a host at Vice and Much Music became the series producer.

=== Sessions ===
Formerly known as Smoke Sessions, Herb produces Sessions, a video series that brings cannabis enthusiasts together for a smoke session to discuss how the plant has impacted their lives.
