= Toothpaste for Dinner =

Webcomic

- Sample comic
- Author(s): Drew
- Website: toothpastefordinner.com
- Current status/schedule: Weekly
- Launch date: January 1, 2002
- Genre(s): Comedy

Toothpaste for Dinner is a webcomic created by Drew Fairweather. The comic was launched on January 1, 2002.

While strips were previously posted daily or several times a week, new strips are currently posted each Monday at 12:01 AM, EST. Each comic features small, simple drawings, paired with short captions or dialogue. The style of humor on Toothpaste for Dinner encompasses surrealism, irony, social commentary, cynicism, and schadenfreude, among other types of humor. Each cartoon is entirely self-contained (except in certain cases of a series, such as the horoscope series.)

== Art ==
The art for Toothpaste for Dinner is drawn with ink on paper (Uni-Ball Micro pens and 300 lb. wt. Bristol board illustration paper). Although the art is primarily black and white, a color comic is occasionally posted. The art style, although minimalist, stands out due to its disjointed style. The artist often draws people with misaligned eyes, and only three, flipper-like fingers. The comic has been illustrated by contractors since 2010, so that Fairweather can focus on his other projects: "The Worst Things for Sale" and his rap career as Crudbump.

== Reception ==
Sam Anderson of Slate described Toothpaste for Dinner as "the most addictive comic on the Web." Whitney Reynolds, producer of PC Magazine, said that the webcomic showed "beauty in simplicity," and supported Anderson's claim of the Toothpaste for Dinner's addictive nature.

== Books ==
- The Drew Book
- Mad Drew: Beyond Coffeedome
- Toothpaste for Dinner: hipsters, hamsters and other pressing issues, 2005 (ISBN 1-58180-786-4)

== See also ==
- Married to the Sea
