= Married to the Sea =

Webcomic

- Author(s): Drew and Natalie Dee
- Website: www.marriedtothesea.com
- Current status/schedule: updates daily
- Launch date: February 13, 2006

Married to the Sea is a webcomic by husband and wife Drew Fairweather and Natalie Dee. Both Drew and Natalie have creative input on Married to the Sea but the comic is not strictly collaborative. Each has a personal webcomic project: Drew is also the author of Toothpaste for Dinner and Natalie Dee produces NatalieDee.

There is one new comic on Married to the Sea daily. According to the site, it updates at midnight EST, "without exception". The comics themselves are composed of public domain images (Victorian or otherwise) combined with new captions written by the authors. Despite its dated appearance, frequent anachronistic references to current events, as well as modern technologies and concepts, make it apparent that the comic itself is being written in the present day. Married to the Sea has been described by New York magazine as "brilliant" and "lowbrow".

The comic draws its inspiration from many different domains, including popular music and entertainment, science, history, government, politics and philosophy. The intentions of the characters are frequently ambiguous, and their actions and words are frequently (and often bizarrely) at odds with the opinions expressed in actual Victorian-era America.

The first Married to the Sea comic was posted online on February 13, 2006. The site now sells several T-shirts and prints based on comics from Married to the Sea.

In March 2012, Drew and Natalie created three new websites full of non-comic content. These are @drewtoothpaste, The Worst Things for Sale, and Stuff I Put on Myself.

== NatalieDee ==
NatalieDee.com
- Author: Natalie Dee
- Website: www.nataliedee.com www.nataliedeemachine.com
- Current status/schedule: NatalieDee.com ceased updating as of December 5, 2013; NatalieDeeMachine.com is live as of February 15, 2014
- Launch date: September 17, 2002

NatalieDee is a webcomic created by Natalie Dee Fairweather, one of the authors of Married to the Sea.

There was a new comic added daily to NatalieDee.com until 2013. The Webcomics comprise various sketches illustrating amusing or anecdotal situations from everyday life. The comics do not follow a plot, but do feature recurring characters such as Natalie Dee's dogs, Chester and Charles.

There are a number of references to Natalie Dee's own life, for example her pets and previous jobs and family, although the comics are not supposed to be autobiographical.

According to The Daily Gamecock, "Natalie Dee's comics are a daily dose of amusement, entertainment and, oftentimes, confusion", while they are referred to as "unbearable cuteness" by Entertainment Weekly.

The first Natalie Dee webcomic was published on 17 September 2002. At this point the comic was not regularly updated. The comic began being updated on weekdays from 29 December 2003 and then daily as of 9 May 2005 until December 5, 2013.

Since the first comics the overall look of the illustrations moved away from paper drawings, using software to create the hand-drawn style. Natalie Dee sometimes blends photographs or stock imagery with illustration.

As of December 5, 2013, NatalieDee.com is no longer being regularly updated. The front page randomly shuffles comics from previous dates.

In February 2014, Natalie Dee launched NatalieDeeMachine.com, a random comic generator in the style of classic Natalie Dee comics.

== Drew ==
Drew Fairweather, professionally known as Drew, is an American author and artist residing in Vermont. He is notable for being the creator of the webcomic Toothpaste for Dinner, and is the co-creator of Married to the Sea, alongside his wife Natalie Dee Fairweather.

Drew was previously a research chemist and held several patents before transitioning to full-time work with his webcomic Toothpaste for Dinner. His industry work centered around the interactions of nitrogen-bonded urea with silicone gel, which formed the basis for his later music work (under the band name Hell Orbs) as "Piss Admiral Dildo Captain". For the first two years of TFD's existence, Drew worked as a cat photographer to "make ends meet" before it became popular. In September 2006, Drew revealed himself to be the entity behind the electronic musician KOMPRESSOR, which was previously only known by the alias "Andreas K.". Drew has since released other albums under the artist name Dog Traders and CRUDBUMP. On 11 April 2011, Drew published his first novel, Veins.

In 2015 Drew revealed that he was "Mr. Eggs", a notorious internet troll who posted hundreds of times to "Misc," a forum on bodybuilding.com. Drew has also spoken of inserting false “facts” into Wikipedia articles.
